= National Book Critics Circle Award for Fiction =

Annual American literary award

- Awarded for: "the finest books and reviews published in English"
- Sponsored by: National Book Critics Circle
- First award: 1976
- Website: https://www.bookcritics.org/awards

The National Book Critics Circle Award for Fiction, established in 1976, is an annual American literary award presented by the National Book Critics Circle (NBCC) to promote "the finest books and reviews published in English."

Books previously published in English are not eligible, such as re-issues and paperback editions. They do consider "translations, short story and essay collections, self-published books, and any titles that fall under the general categories."

The judges are the volunteer directors of the NBCC who are 24 members serving rotating three-year terms, with eight elected annually by the voting members, namely "professional book review editors and book reviewers." Winners of the awards are announced each year at the NBCC awards ceremony in conjunction with the yearly membership meeting, which takes place in March.

== Recipients ==
National Book Critics Circle Award for Fiction winners and finalists
Year	Author	Title	Result	Ref.
1975	E. L. Doctorow	Ragtime	Winner	
1976	John Gardner	October Light	Winner	
1976	Cynthia Ozick	Bloodshed and Three Novellas	Finalist	
1976	Vladimir Nabokov	Details of a Sunset and Other Stories	Finalist	
1976	Renata Adler	Speedboat	Finalist	
1976	Richard Yates	The Easter Parade	Finalist	
1977	Toni Morrison	Song of Solomon	Winner	
1977	Joan Didion	A Book of Common Prayer	Finalist	
1977	John Cheever	Falconer	Finalist	
1977	Philip Roth	The Professor of Desire	Finalist	
1977	John Sayles	Union Dues	Finalist	
1978	John Cheever	The Stories of John Cheever	Winner	
1978	Mary Gordon	Final Payments	Finalist	
1978	John Updike	The Coup	Finalist	
1978	John Irving	The World According to Garp	Finalist	
1978	Charles Simmons	Wrinkles	Finalist	
1979	Thomas Flanagan	The Year of the French	Winner	
1979	Leslie Epstein	King of the Jews: A Novel of the Holocaust	Finalist	
1979	Elizabeth Hardwick	Sleepless Nights	Finalist	
1979	William Styron	Sophie's Choice	Finalist	
1979	Norman Mailer	The Executioner's Song: A True Life Novel	Finalist	
1979	Philip Roth	The Ghost Writer	Finalist	
1980	Shirley Hazzard	The Transit of Venus	Winner	
1980	E. L. Doctorow	Loon Lake	Finalist	
1980	Anne Tyler	Morgan's Passing	Finalist	
1980	William Maxwell	So Long, See You Tomorrow	Finalist	
1980	Walker Percy	The Second Coming	Finalist	
1981	John Updike	Rabbit Is Rich	Winner	
1981	Robert Stone	A Flag for Sunrise	Finalist	
1981	Russell Hoban	Riddley Walker	Finalist	
1981	Donald Barthelme	Sixty Stories	Finalist	
1981	Leonard Michaels	The Men's Club	Finalist	
1982	Stanley Elkin	George Mills	Winner	
1982	Anne Tyler	Dinner at the Homesick Restaurant	Finalist	
1982	Cynthia Ozick	Levitation: Five Fictions	Finalist	
1982	Bobbie Ann Mason	Shiloh and Other Stories	Finalist	
1982	Alice Walker	The Color Purple	Finalist	
1983	William Kennedy	Ironweed	Winner	
1983	Raymond Carver	Cathedral	Finalist	
1983	Joan Chase	During the Reign of the Queen of Persia	Finalist	
1983	Ron Loewinsohn	Magnetic Field (s)	Finalist	
1983	Philip Roth	The Anatomy Lesson	Finalist	
1984	Louise Erdrich	Love Medicine	Winner	
1984	David Leavitt	Family Dancing	Finalist	
1984	Alison Lurie	Foreign Affairs	Finalist	
1984	Jayne Anne Phillips	Machine Dreams	Finalist	
1984	Harriet Doerr	Stones for Ibarra	Finalist	
1985	Anne Tyler	The Accidental Tourist	Winner	
1985	Larry McMurtry	Lonesome Dove	Finalist	
1985	Peter Taylor	The Old Forest and Other Stories	Finalist	
1985	Richard Powers	Three Farmers on Their Way to a Dance	Finalist	
1985	Don DeLillo	White Noise	Finalist	
1986	Reynolds Price	Kate Vaiden	Winner	
1986	Peter Taylor	A Summons to Memphis	Finalist	
1986	John Updike	Roger's Version	Finalist	
1986	Louise Erdrich	The Beet Queen	Finalist	
1986	Thomas Williams	The Moon Pinnacle	Finalist	
1987	Philip Roth	The Counterlife	Winner	
1987	Toni Morrison	Beloved	Finalist	
1987	Wallace Stegner	Crossing to Safety	Finalist	
1987	Jane Smiley	The Age of Grief	Finalist	
1987	Tom Wolfe	The Bonfire of the Vanities	Finalist	
1988	Bharati Mukherjee	The Middleman and Other Stories	Winner	
1988	Don DeLillo	Libra	Finalist	
1988	Pete Dexter	Paris Trout	Finalist	
1988	J. F. Powers	Wheat That Springeth Green	Finalist	
1988	Raymond Carver	Where I'm Calling From: New and Selected Stories	Finalist	
1989	E. L. Doctorow	Billy Bathgate	Winner	
1989	Jane Smiley	Ordinary Love & Good Will	Finalist	
1989	John Casey	Spartina	Finalist	
1989	Amy Tan	The Joy Luck Club	Finalist	
1989	Oscar Hijuelos	The Mambo Kings Play Songs of Love	Finalist	
1990	John Updike	Rabbit at Rest	Winner	
1990	Wallace Stegner	Collected Stories	Finalist	
1990	Sue Miller	Family Pictures	Finalist	
1990	Charles Johnson	Middle Passage	Finalist	
1990	Tim O’Brien	The Things They Carried	Finalist	
1991	Jane Smiley	A Thousand Acres	Winner	
1991	Norman Rush	Mating	Finalist	
1991	Richard Powers	The Gold Bug Variations	Finalist	
1991	Gish Jen	Typical American	Finalist	
1991	Louis Begley	Wartime Lies	Finalist	
1992	Cormac McCarthy	All the Pretty Horses	Winner	
1992	Joyce Carol Oates	Black Water	Finalist	
1992	Richard Price	Clockers	Finalist	
1992	Randall Kenan	Let the Dead Bury Their Dead	Finalist	
1992	Robert Stone	Outerbridge Reach	Finalist	
1993	Ernest J. Gaines	A Lesson Before Dying	Winner	
1993	Bobbie Ann Mason	Feather Crowns	Finalist	
1993	Rikki Ducornet	The Jade Cabinet	Finalist	
1993	E. Annie Proulx	The Shipping News	Finalist	
1993	Frances Sherwood	Vindication	Finalist	
1994	Carol Shields	The Stone Diaries	Winner	
1994	William Gaddis	A Frolic of His Own	Finalist	
1994	Julius Lester	And All Our Wounds Forgiven	Finalist	
1994	Julia Alvarez	In the Time of the Butterflies	Finalist	
1994	Alan Isler	The Prince of West End Avenue	Finalist	
1995	Stanley Elkin	Mrs. Ted Bliss	Winner	
1995	Richard Powers	Galatea 2.2	Finalist	
1995	Richard Ford	Independence Day	Finalist	
1995	Jane Smiley	Moo	Finalist	
1995	Paul West	The Tent of Orange Mist	Finalist	
1996	Gina Berriault	Women in Their Beds	Winner	
1996	Louis Begley	About Schmidt	Finalist	
1996	Andre Dubus	Dancing After Hours	Finalist	
1996	Henry Roth	From Bondage	Finalist	
1996	Jamaica Kincaid	The Autobiography of My Mother	Finalist	
1997	Penelope Fitzgerald	The Blue Flower	Winner	
1997	Philip Roth	American Pastoral	Finalist	
1997	Charles Frazier	Cold Mountain	Finalist	
1997	Andrei Makine	Dreams of My Russian Summers	Finalist	
1997	Don DeLillo	Underworld	Finalist	
1998	Alice Munro	The Love of a Good Woman	Winner	
1998	Lorrie Moore	Birds of America	Finalist	
1998	Lynne Tillman	No Lease on Life	Finalist	
1998	David Gates	Preston Falls	Finalist	
1998	Michael Cunningham	The Hours	Finalist	
1999	Jonathan Lethem	Motherless Brooklyn	Winner	
1999	J. M. Coetzee	Disgrace	Finalist	
1999	A. Manette Ansay	Midnight Champagne	Finalist	
1999	Frederick Busch	The Night Inspector	Finalist	
1999	David Gates	Wonders of the Invisible World	Finalist	
2000	Jim Crace	Being Dead	Winner	
2000	Amy Bloom	A Blind Man Can See How Much I Love You	Finalist	
2000	David Means	Assorted Fire Events	Finalist	
2000	Michael Chabon	The Amazing Adventures of Kavalier and Clay	Finalist	
2000	Zadie Smith	White Teeth	Finalist	
2001	W.G. Sebald with Anthea Bell (trans.)	Austerlitz	Winner	
2002	Ian McEwan	Atonement	Winner	
2003	Edward P. Jones	The Known World	Winner	
2004	Marilynne Robinson	Gilead	Winner	
2005	E. L. Doctorow	The March	Winner	
2006	Kiran Desai	The Inheritance of Loss	Winner	
2007	Junot Díaz	The Brief Wondrous Life of Oscar Wao	Winner	
2007	Hisham Matar	In the Country of Men	Finalist	
2007	Joyce Carol Oates	The Gravedigger's Daughter	Finalist	
2007	Marianne Wiggins	The Shadow Catcher	Finalist	
2007	Vikram Chandra	Sacred Games	Finalist	
2008	Roberto Bolaño with Natasha Wimmer (trans.)	2666	Winner	
2008	Aleksandar Hemon	The Lazarus Project	Finalist	
2008	Elizabeth Strout	Olive Kitteridge	Finalist	
2008	M. Glenn Taylor	The Ballad of Trenchmouth Taggart	Finalist	
2008	Marilynne Robinson	Home	Finalist	
2009	Hilary Mantel	Wolf Hall	Winner	
2009	Bonnie Jo Campbell	American Salvage	Finalist	
2009	Jayne Anne Phillips	Lark and Termite	Finalist	
2009	Marlon James	The Book of Night Women	Finalist	
2009	Michelle Huneven	Blame	Finalist	
2010	Jennifer Egan	A Visit from the Goon Squad	Winner	
2010	David Grossman	To the End of the Land	Finalist	
2010	Hans Keilson	Comedy in a Minor Key	Finalist	
2010	Jonathan Franzen	Freedom	Finalist	
2010	Paul Murray	Skippy Dies	Finalist	
2011	Edith Pearlman	Binocular Vision: New and Selected Stories	Winner	
2011	Alan Hollinghurst	The Stranger's Child	Finalist	
2011	Dana Spiotta	Stone Arabia	Finalist	
2011	Jeffrey Eugenides	The Marriage Plot	Finalist	
2011	Teju Cole	Open City	Finalist	
2012	Ben Fountain	Billy Lynn's Long Halftime Walk	Winner	
2012	Adam Johnson	The Orphan Master's Son	Finalist	
2012	Laurent Binet with Sam Taylor (trans.)	HHhH	Finalist	
2012	Lydia Millet	Magnificence	Finalist	
2012	Zadie Smith	NW	Finalist	
2013	Chimamanda Ngozi Adichie	Americanah	Winner	
2013	Alice McDermott	Someone	Finalist	
2013	Donna Tartt	The Goldfinch	Finalist	
2013	Javier Marías with Margaret Jull Costa (trans.)	The Infatuations	Finalist	
2013	Ruth Ozeki	A Tale for the Time Being	Finalist	
2014	Marilynne Robinson	Lila	Winner	
2014	Chang-rae Lee	On Such a Full Sea	Finalist	
2014	Lily King	Euphoria	Finalist	
2014	Marlon James	A Brief History of Seven Killings	Finalist	
2014	Rabih Alameddine	An Unnecessary Woman	Finalist	
2015	Paul Beatty	The Sellout	Winner	
2015	Anthony Marra	The Tsar of Love and Techno	Finalist	
2015	Lauren Groff	Fates and Furies	Finalist	
2015	Ottessa Moshfegh	Eileen	Finalist	
2015	Valeria Luiselli	The Story of My Teeth	Finalist	
2016	Louise Erdrich	LaRose	Winner	
2016	Adam Haslett	Imagine Me Gone	Finalist	
2016	Ann Patchett	Commonwealth	Finalist	
2016	Michael Chabon	Moonglow: A Novel	Finalist	
2016	Zadie Smith	Swing Time	Finalist	
2017	Joan Silber	Improvement	Winner	
2017	Alice McDermott	The Ninth Hour	Finalist	
2017	Arundhati Roy	The Ministry of Utmost Happiness	Finalist	
2017	Jesmyn Ward	Sing, Unburied, Sing	Finalist	
2017	Mohsin Hamid	Exit West	Finalist	
2018	Anna Burns	Milkman	Winner	
2018	Denis Johnson	The Largesse of the Sea Maiden	Finalist	
2018	Luis Alberto Urrea	The House of Broken Angels	Finalist	
2018	Patrick Chamoiseau with Linda Coverdale (trans.)	Slave Old Man	Finalist	
2018	Rachel Kushner	The Mars Room	Finalist	
2019	Edwidge Danticat	Everything Inside	Winner	
2019	Ben Lerner	The Topeka School	Finalist	
2019	Colson Whitehead	The Nickel Boys	Finalist	
2019	Myla Goldberg	Feast Your Eyes	Finalist	
2019	Valeria Luiselli	Lost Children Archive	Finalist	
2020	Maggie O'Farrell	Hamnet	Winner	
2020	Bryan Washington	Memorial	Finalist	
2020	Martin Amis	Inside Story	Finalist	
2020	Randall Kenan	If I Had Two Wings	Finalist	
2020	Souvankham Thammavongsa	How to Pronounce Knife	Finalist	
2021	Honorée Fanonne Jeffers	The Love Songs of W.E.B. Du Bois	Winner	
2021	Colson Whitehead	Harlem Shuffle	Finalist	
2021	Joshua Cohen	The Netanyahus	Finalist	
2021	Rachel Cusk	Second Place	Finalist	
2021	Sarah Hall	Burntcoat	Finalist	
2022	Ling Ma	Bliss Montage	Winner	
2022	Percival Everett	Dr. No	Finalist	
2022	Jon Fosse with Damion Searls (trans.)	A New Name	Finalist	
2022	Mieko Kawakami with Sam Bett and David Boyd (trans.)	All the Lovers in the Night	Finalist	
2022	Namwali Serpell	The Furrows	Finalist	
2023	Lorrie Moore	I Am Homeless if This Is Not My Home	Winner	
2023	Teju Cole	Tremor	Finalist	
2023	Daniel Mason	North Woods	Finalist	
2023	Marie NDiaye with Jordan Stump (trans.)	Vengeance Is Mine	Finalist	
2023	Justin Torres	Blackouts	Finalist	
2024	Hisham Matar	My Friends	Winner	
2024	Marie-Helene Bertino	Beautyland	Finalist	
2024	Percival Everett	James	Finalist	
2024	Nora Lange	Us Fools	Finalist	
2024	Joseph O'Neill	Godwin	Finalist	
2025	Han Kang with e. yaewon and Paige Aniyah Morris (trans.)	We Do Not Part	Winner	
2025	Karen Russell	The Antidote	Finalist	
2025	Katie Kitamura	Audition	Finalist	
2025	Solvej Balle with Sophia Hersi Smith and Jennifer Russell (trans.)	On the Calculation of Volume (Book III)	Finalist	
2025	Angela Flournoy	The Wilderness	Finalist	
