= Frances Coady =

British publisher

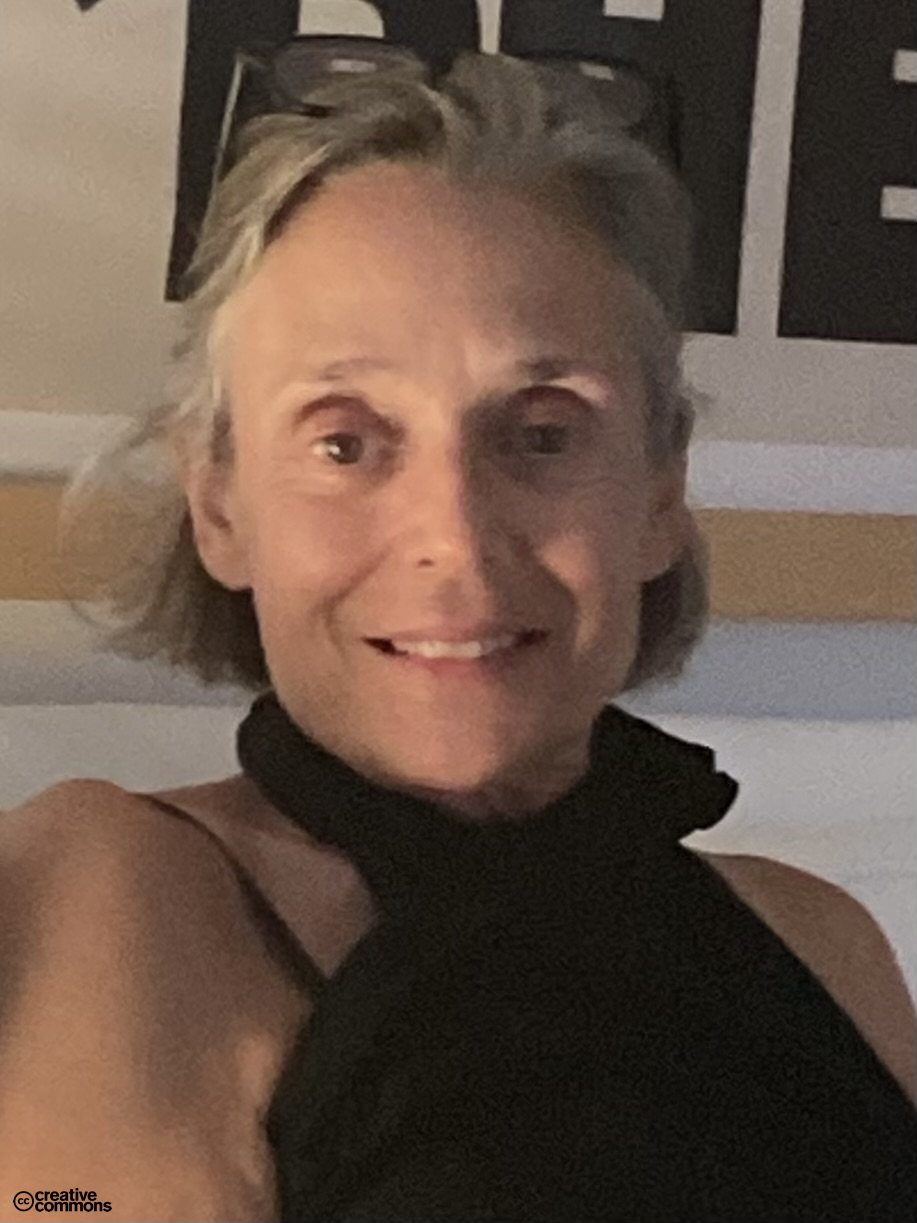
- Born: London, England
- Education: University of Sussex; University of Essex
- Occupations: Publisher; literary agent
- Website: https://aragi.net/agents/frances-coady/

Frances Coady is a veteran British publisher. She started Vintage paperbacks in the UK before moving to New York as the publisher of Picador, where she is now a literary agent at the Aragi agency.

== Early life ==
Born in London, Frances Coady has degrees from the University of Sussex and the University of Essex.

== Career ==
Coady began her publishing career in 1982 in London at Faber & Faber, where she published Self-Help by Lorrie Moore, The Final Passage and The European Tribe by Caryl Phillips, and Edward Said's The World, the Text, and the Critic and After the Last Sky. In 1987, she became editorial director of Jonathan Cape and was featured in "The Powers That Will Be – We Choose the People Who Will Run Britain In the Nineties" in The Sunday Times Magazine. In 1989, she became the founding publisher of Vintage paperbacks"whose stunning success launched a thousand embarrassing moments in editorial conferences throughout Britain", according to The Independent. She continued to edit and publish authors including Edward Said (Culture and Imperialism); Salman Rushdie (The Moor's Last Sigh) and John Pilger(A Secret Country).

In 1993, Coady became the publisher of the newly created literary division of Random House UK, and "one of the most powerful women in British publishing". She left Random House to relaunch Granta Books as a fully independent publishing house publishing in 1997.

In 2000, Coady moved to New York to become the publisher of Picador USA, an imprint of the Macmillan Group, which she turned into a paperback house with bestsellers and award-winning authors including Michael Chabon's The Amazing Adventures of Kavalier & Clay; Per Petterson's Out Stealing Horses, Edmund De Waal's The Hare with Amber Eyes and Edward St Aubyn's Patrick Melrose Novels.

She also published Frances Coady Books within Henry Holt and Farrar Straus & Giroux, including Naomi Klein's The Shock Doctrine; Richard Powers' Generosity and; Andrew Sean Greer's The Confessions of Max Tivoli. Vintage originals included The Collected Stories of Deborah Eisenberg and Esi Edugyan's Half-Blood Blues. In September 2012, Coady joined Scott Rudin and Barry Diller of IAC to found a new publishing house, Brightline, which became Atavist Books. Atavist Books launched in 2014 with Karen Russell's Sleep Donation

As a literary agent at Aragi, Coady's authors include: Sharon Olds; Claudia Rankine; Ocean Vuong; Michael Cunningham, and Rebecca Solnit.

== Awards and distinctions ==
Coady is an Honorary Fellow of the Royal Society of Literature.

== Personal life ==
Coady is married to the novelist Peter Carey.
