= Chinese-American speculative fiction =

Chinese-American speculative fiction is speculative fiction written by Chinese-American authors. Many speculative works by Asian American authors delve into the immigrant experience, addressing themes of displacement, assimilation, and the search for belonging in a new land. Like speculative fiction in general, Chinese American speculative fiction often serves as a platform for social commentary. It may address current issues such as racism, discrimination, environmental degradation, and political unrest through the lens of speculative elements. Chinese American speculative fiction written by and about women work on creating the feeling of nostalgia in readers, focusing in on experiences by second-generation Americans.

== Prominent male authors ==
=== Ted Chiang ===
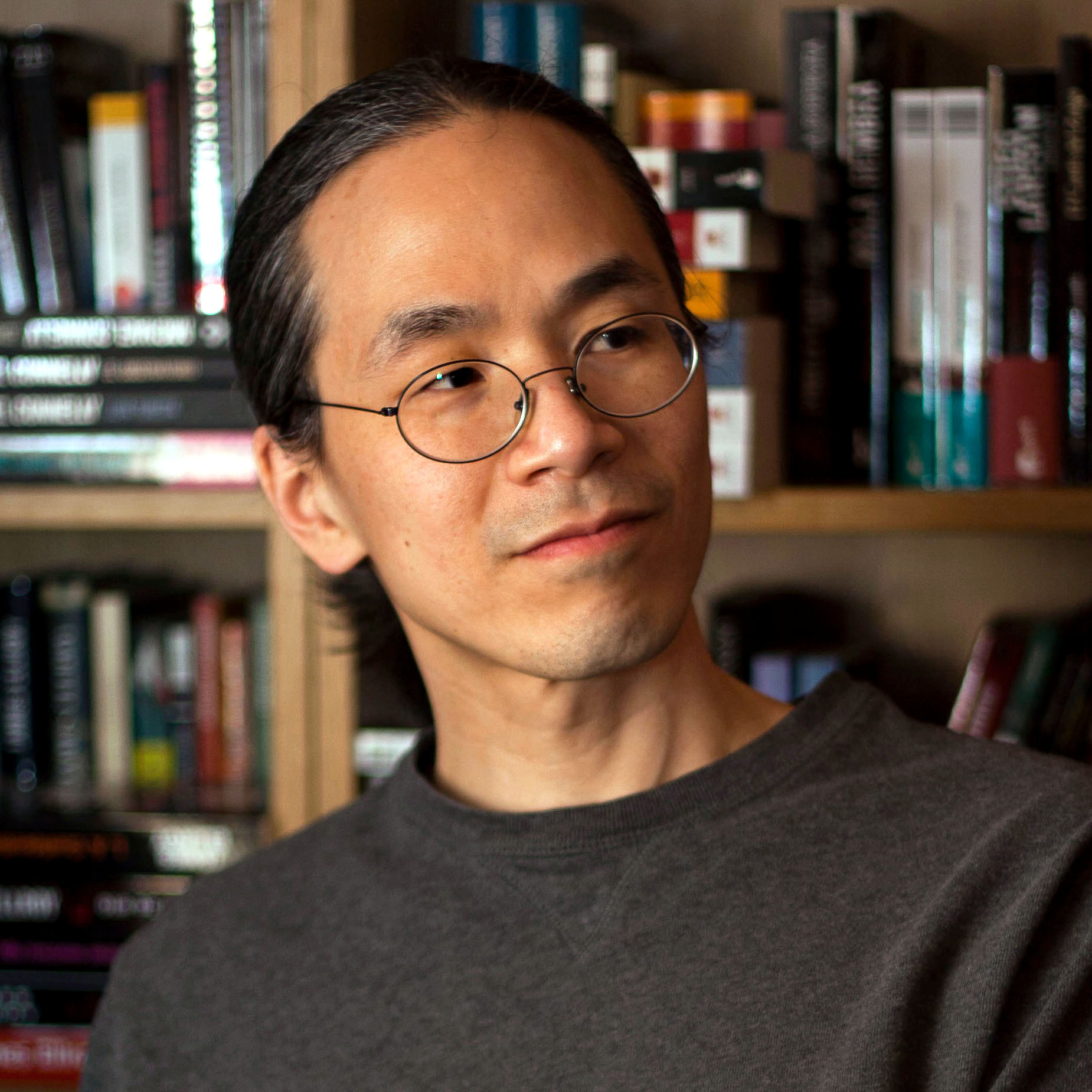
Ted Chiang, American Chinese author of "Story of Your Life"

One notable Asian American speculative fiction author is Ted Chiang, who is especially known for his short stories. His 1998 short story "Story of Your Life" is the basis for the 2016 film Arrival, which tells the story of a linguist who tries to decipher an alien language, and as she does so, her perception of time is profoundly altered.

Chiang is the winner of numerous Hugo, Locus, and Nebula awards. He was born in Port Jefferson, New York, and his parents are immigrants from China. Chiang refers to himself as an "occasional writer" and doesn't feel the need to write constantly or prolifically. His goal as a writer is to engage in philosophical thought experiments and try to work out the implications of various concepts. He has said that he won't start writing a story until he knows how it's going to end, and actually spent five years researching linguistics before feeling prepared to write "Story of Your Life."

=== Ken Liu ===
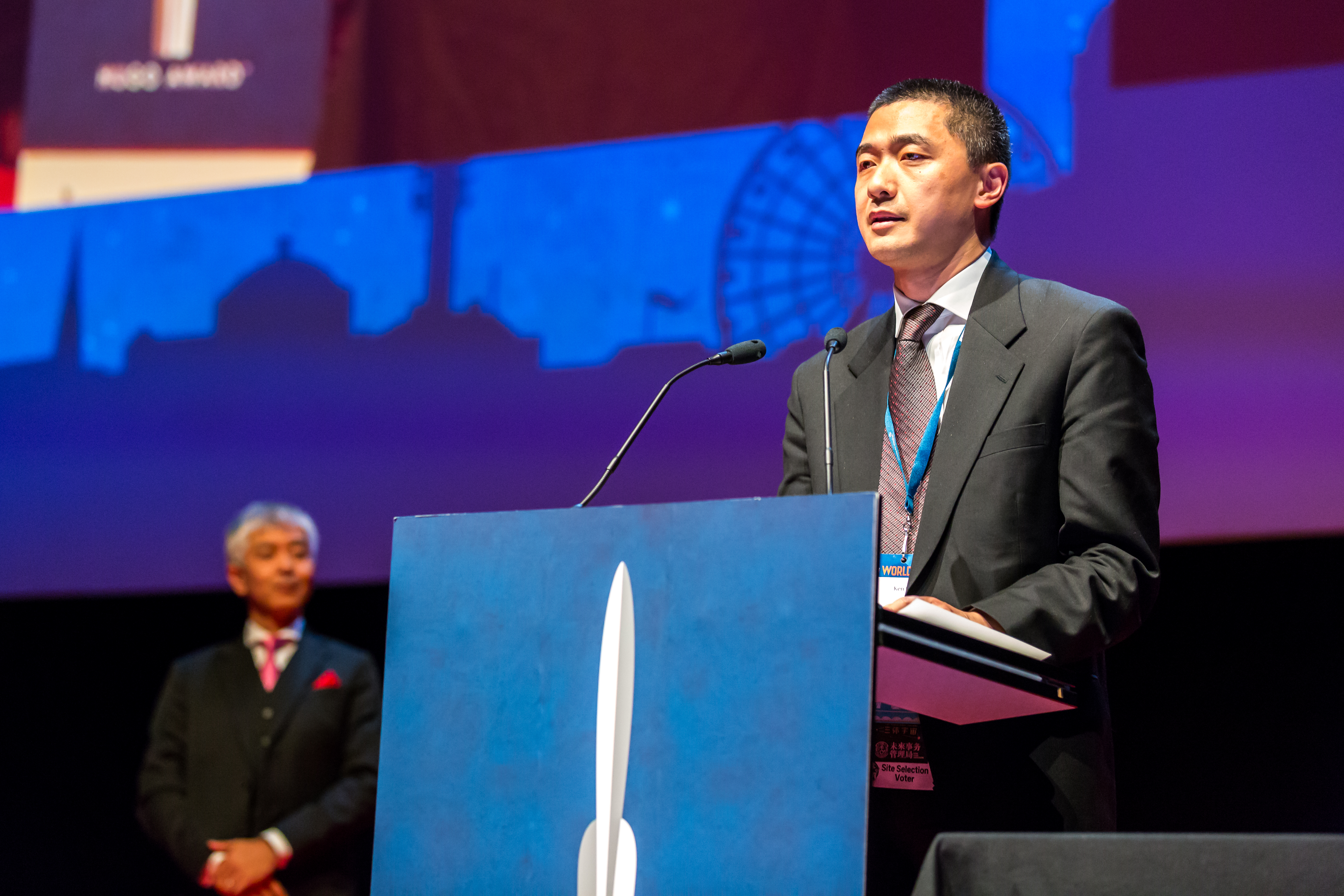
Ken Liu at the Hugo Awards Ceremony 2017

Chinese-American author Ken Liu was born in China but immigrated to the US at age 11. He has not only translated numerous Chinese science fiction novels into English, (including Three Body Problem by Liu Cixin, which became the first Asian novel to with the Hugo Award for Best Novel in 2015), but has also won the Hugo, Nebula, Locus and other awards for his short stories and novels.

When translating Chinese works to English, Liu has said that it can be difficult trying to translate the historical references and literary allusions that Chinese works are filled with. Unless a reader was fluent in Chinese culture, most of these references would not be easily understood.

Liu has coined his own sub-genre mix of ancient Chinese legend and western fantasy as "silkpunk." This can be read in several of his novels such as The Grace of Kings and The Wall of Storms.

== Fiction written by and about women ==
Chinese-American speculative fiction written by and about women work on creating the feeling of nostalgia in readers, focusing in on experiences by second-generation Americans. Women's experiences are also explored through the lens of cyberpunk fiction, with an emphasis on the female body.

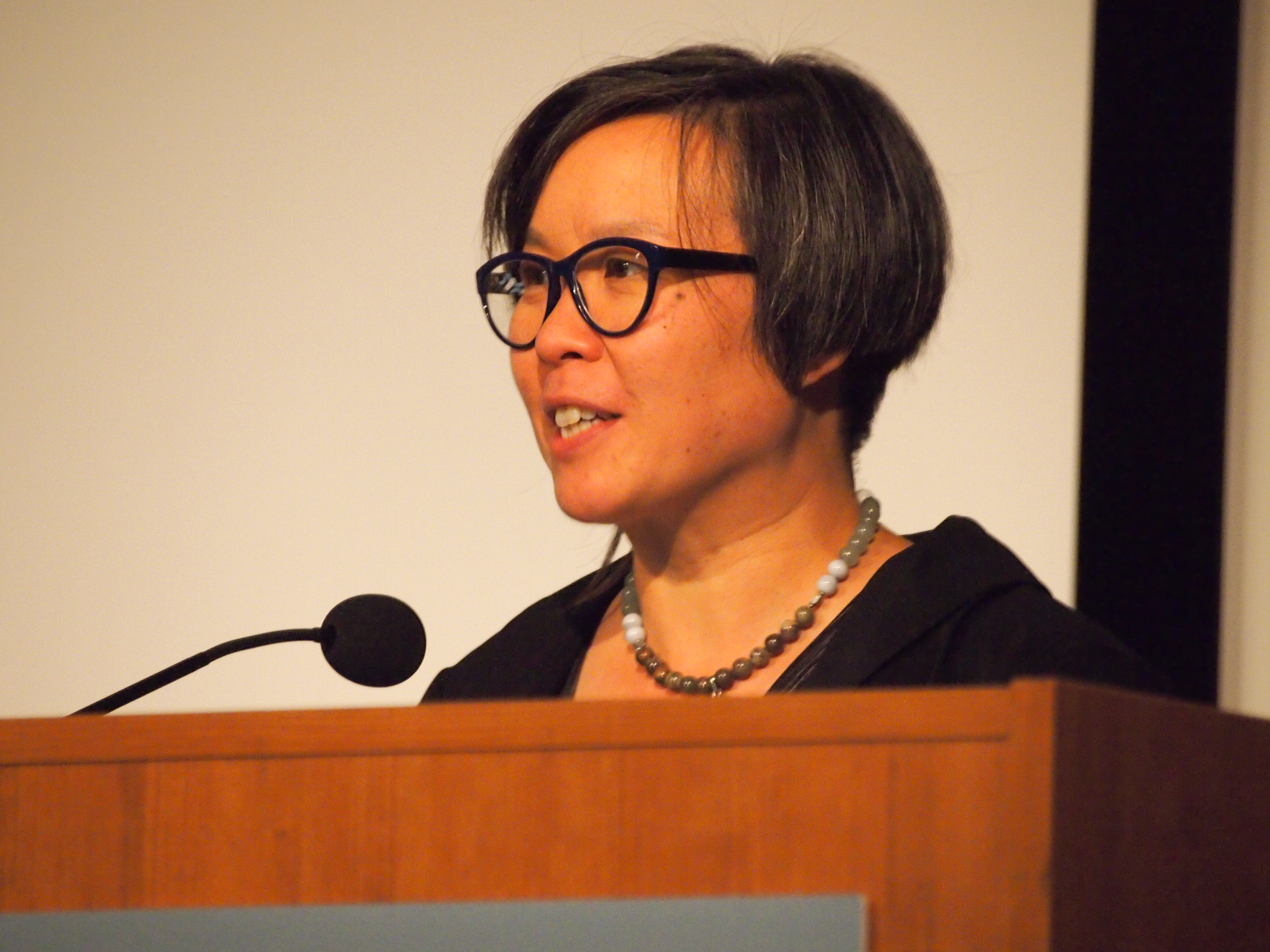
Larissa Lai, author of Salt Fish Girl

Texts written by female authors place women in the lead in previously male-dominated spaces, bringing about themes of empowerment. These Chinese American fiction texts pull from the past, invoking the feeling of nostalgia in readers. Novels such as Salt Fish Girl by Larissa Lai, may also pull from Chinese mythology in their works. It is common for varying forms of privilege to be discussed and to examine the myriad of ways in which it affects those who have it versus those who do not.

History is also largely taken into account in these texts from when people first immigrated from China to the United States. Chinese American fiction texts then often give the perspectives of second-generation Americans and how their experiences affect both daily and family life, pulling from historical influences or personal experience. Issues surrounding race are prominent and examined in these texts, both through metaphor and explicit statements.

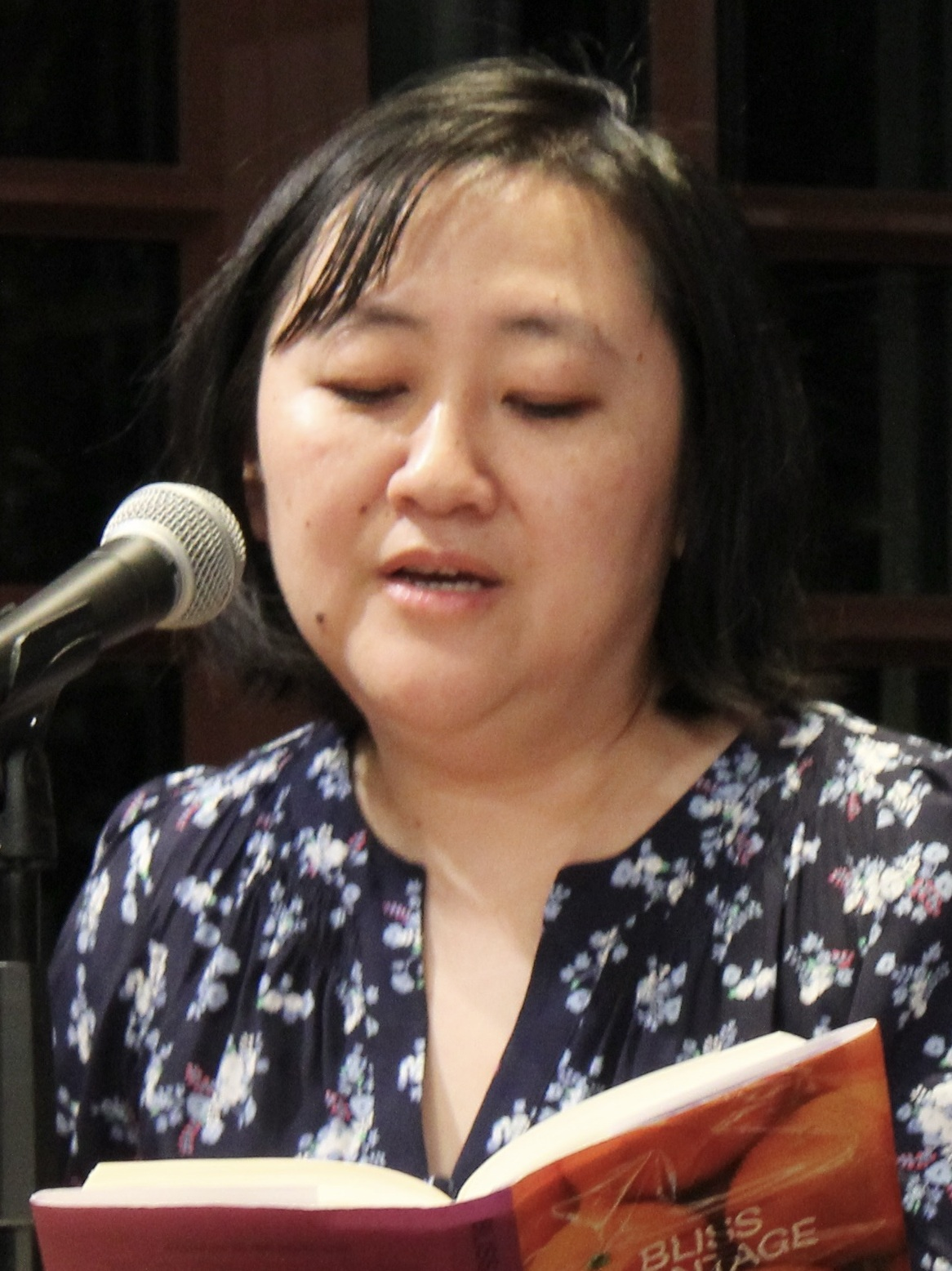
Ling Ma, author of Severance

With the novel Severance by Ling Ma as a guide, other themes can be found of transformation, including that of both people and landscapes. Common themes in this text and others, focus on the ways that corporations determine societal norms and expectations, and the effect that has on the individual.

A sub-genre of some Chinese American speculative fiction texts can be described as cyberpunk, in which an emphasis is placed onto technology. Reproductive rights are another common theme and issue, often discussed through a cyberpunk lens. In texts centering women, the clone is discussed as a metaphor for the female body. Female Chinese American authors in speculative fiction may discuss varying issues surrounding sexuality of the female body and the way it is seen and used in corporate society, utilizing the previously mentioned common themes.

== See also ==
- Chinese science fiction
- Speculative fiction by writers of color
