= Birds of America =

Birds of America may refer to:

- The Birds of America, a book by John James Audubon first published in sections between 1827 and 1838
- Birds of America (film), a 2008 film directed by Craig Lucas.
- Birds of America (novel), a 1971 novel by Mary McCarthy
- Birds of America (short story collection), a 1998 collection of stories by Lorrie Moore

== See also ==
- Category:Lists of birds of the United States
- Birds of North America (book), an encyclopedia
