= Self-help (disambiguation) =

Self-help is self-guided improvement economically, intellectually, or emotionally, most frequently with a substantial psychological or spiritual basis.

Self-help may also refer to:

== Organisations ==
- Samopomich (translates to "Self-help"), political party in Ukraine
- Center for Community Self-Help, leading Community Development Financial Institution

== Art and entertainment ==
=== Music ===
- Self Help (album), album released by the metalcore band Spitfire

=== Television ===
- "Self Help" (Space Ghost Coast to Coast), an episode of Space Ghost Coast to Coast
- "Self Help" (The Walking Dead), an episode of the television series The Walking Dead

=== Literature ===
- Self-help book, book intended as a help in self-improvement of the reader
- Self-Help (Smiles book), book published in 1859 by Samuel Smiles
- Self-Help (short story collection), 1985 short story collection by Lorrie Moore
- Self Help (novel), novel published in 2007 by Edward Docx

== Other uses ==
- Self-help (law), individuals' implementation of their rights without resorting to legal writ or consultation of higher authority
- The self-help doctrine, the Realist response to Anarchy (international relations)
