= Bliss Montage =

2022 collection by Ling Ma

- Author: Ling Ma
- Language: English
- Publisher: Farrar, Straus and Giroux
- Publication date: September 13, 2022
- Pages: 228
- Awards: National Book Critics Circle Award The Story Prize
- ISBN: 978-0-374-29351-2

Bliss Montage is a 2022 short story collection by Chinese American writer Ling Ma, published by Farrar, Straus and Giroux. Eight stories in total, the book's pieces span topics of dating, positionality, and diaspora literature, including pieces formerly published in The Atlantic and The New Yorker. The book won the National Book Critics Circle Award for Fiction in 2022 and The Story Prize for fiction.

== Plot ==
The book has eight stories. "Los Angeles" and "Oranges" are about a woman living in a house with her husband and a hundred ex-boyfriends. "G" follows two friends who use a drug to escape reality. "Yeti Lovemaking" involves a sexual encounter between a human woman and a yeti. "Returning" involves a woman traveling with her husband to his homeland to partake in an unusual ritual. "Office Hours", also published as a short story in The Atlantic, is about a mentee-mentor relationship at a university. "Peking Duck", originally published in The New Yorker, concerns the complicated relationship between a Chinese American woman and her mother, further complicated by the woman's position as a fiction writer whose work draws upon her and her mother's experiences. "Tomorrow" observes a woman's troubled, disturbing pregnancy, which her doctor explains as the result of toxic substances in her hygienic products.

== Reception ==
In a starred review, Kirkus Reviews found the short story collection's themes "rich". Publishers Weekly was ambivalent on the execution of certain conceits but found "much to enjoy."

The New York Times called the book "a striking collection that peddles in the uncanny and the surreal", albeit an at-times inconsistent one that lacked the "zest" of Ma's debut novel, Severance. Los Angeles Times lauded the book's feelings of loneliness and liminality with interesting concepts. Similarly, The Washington Post found the stories "uncanny and haunting". Wired observed Ma's combination of modern woman angst in literature—"women characters who move through cleanly depicted consumerist landscapes with emotional dampers on, either too jaded, too exhausted, or too bored by modern life"—with the additional alienation of being Asian American, which was especially noticed in the "masterful, Rashomon-layered spin on the Asian American mother-daughter conflict" in "Peking Duck". The Star Tribune wrote that the short story collection was "dark and fantastic and very, very true."
