= The Largesse of the Sea Maiden (short story) =

2014 short story by Denis Johnson

- Short story by Denis Johnson
- Country: United States
- Language: English

Publication
- Published in: The New Yorker
- Publication date: March 3, 2014

"The Largesse of the Sea Maiden" is a short story by Denis Johnson. The work was first published in The New Yorker in 2014 and appears as the lead story in Johnson's short story collection of the same name, published posthumously by Random House in 2018.

== Story structure ==
"The Largesse of the Sea Maiden" is the lead story from which the collection The Largesse of the Sea Maiden takes its title. The work is presented in a series of 10 individually titled "vignettes" or "anecdotes", each several pages in length. These vignettes are narrated by a man of "late middle-age", the advertising agency man, Bill Whitman.

=== Vignettes ===
Silences

A middle-class couple, Bill Whitman and his wife Elaine, invite a few suburbanite pairs and singles to a dinner party at their home. The self-complacent guests exchange stories about "the loudest sound" they ever heard. A young war veteran remarks in passing that he lost a leg while serving in Afghanistan. When a young woman requests that he display his stump he assents, on the condition she kisses it. The company, embarrassed, watches as he presents his wound to her and she prepares to comply, then abruptly declines. Six months later the two are married, with the same group as wedding guests.

Accomplices

Bill recalls a dinner that he and Elaine attended years before at the home of his former ad agency boss Miller Thomas and his wife Francesca. The couples freely imbibe fine liqueurs. Inebriated, the two men engage in drunken tests of physical strength, with the encouragement of the women. Miller removes an expensive painting by Marsden Hartley from the wall, and in a gratuitous demonstration of his right to dispose of his own property, thrusts the artwork into the fireplace where it burns to ashes.

Ad Man

Whitman, a former New York City producer of TV commercials, now writes brochures for resorts in San Diego. He regrets his lost youth, and suffers from mild memory loss and back pain. His personal secretary, Shylene, attempts to raise his spirits by accompanying Whitman to a company event where he is presented with an award for an animated commercial. Whitman escapes to a local museum where he witnesses a group of mentally disabled adults he terms "zombies, but good zombies, with minds and souls..." He has an appointment with his chiropractor, where the staff is dressed in Halloween costumes. Whitman remarks: "The masquerade continues."

Farewell

In his kitchen, Whitman answers the telephone. The caller is his first wife, Virginia, or Ginny. She informs Whitman she is dying from cancer. "Ginny" seeks a reckoning with him, contingent upon his acknowledgement that he abused her decades ago, so she can die without bitterness. Whitman is gripped with anxiety when he suspects that this is actually his second wife, Jennifer, nicknamed "Jenny", rather than "Ginny". When Whitman puts her on hold the woman hangs up. Whitman realizes that his apologies would serve either of his former spouses, as "both sets" of his abuses "had been the same."

Widow

An investigative journalist, Tom Ellis, conveys a curious story to Whitman. Ellis interviewed a convicted murderer, William Donals Mason, on death row. Mason informs Ellis that during his incarceration, a cousin of a fellow inmate, married Mason (identified merely as Mrs Mason). During their marriage, she improved Mason's literacy and comforted him in his last weeks before his execution. Ellis meets the widow, and discovers she has always been a sex worker. She presents herself in the nude during the interviews. Ellis and the widow are sexually attracted, and the journalist regrets not pursuing a relationship with her.

Orphan

Whitman attends a memorial service for his recently deceased friend and painter Tony Fido, a case of suicide. Whitman is dismayed at the news. Fido, an eccentric painter, created religious-themed works including lurid depictions of Armageddon and the Second Coming of Christ. Whitman recalls Fido's improbable encounter with the 22-year–old Caesarina, through the chance discovery of her recently deceased husband's cell phone, which the spouse lost in a fatal car crash. The forty-something Fido personally delivers the phone to the young widow.

Memorial

During the memorial service for the deceased Tony Fido. Whitman learns that the attendees are almost entirely strangers to one another. Whitman gathers a few details about Fido's personal history (his mother also committed suicide). Whitman reaccesses Fido's often bizarre pronouncements, now appearing to him as "ominous, prophetic." An attendee bestows a huge binder of Fido's mother's recipes on him, informing the astonished Whitman that Fido "spoke very highly of you" and considered Whitman his best friend.

Casanova

Whitman arrives in New York City to collect a medallion at the American Advertisers Awards. He is in good spirits, and reminisces about his early career in advertising. While suffering a restroom stall from indigestion, he is propositioned for sex by a note from a man in adjoining stall. He ignores the note. When Whitman emerges, he recognizes a former colleague at the wash stand, Carl Zane, and greets him. The man informs him that he is Marshall, Zane's son. The elder Zane is deceased. Whitman, unable to grasp Zane's passing, remarks to the departing son, "Tell your father I said hello."

Mermaid

Whitman retires to this hotel room after the award ceremony. He rises from his bed at 1:00 am to walk the city, blanketed in snow. Whitman delights in observing the denizens of the night, In a tavern he has a strange and moving encounter with a weeping woman who informs him "I am a prisoner here."

Whit

The nearly 63-year-old Whitman reports the most notable advertising creation of his career, a 30-second animation depicting a bear and a rabbit promoting a banking chain. The production is his claim to fame in the industry. Whitman notes his satisfactory marriage with Elaine: "We've gotten along." His two grown daughters he rates as "harmless citizens." Whitman has made his peace with the quality and quantity of his life: "I note that I've lived longer in the past, now, than I can expect to live in the future..."

== Publication history ==
"The Largesse of the Sea Maiden" was originally published in The New Yorker on March 3, 2014. The story appears as the title piece in Johnson's posthumously released volume of short fiction The Largesse of the Sea Maiden (2018).

== Critical assessment ==
"The Largesse of the Sea Maiden" opens Johnson's volume of short fiction of the same name, and as such, it sets the tone for the stories that follow. Critic Gavin Corbett emphasizes the significance of Johnson's placement of "The Largesse of the Sea Maiden" in the volume: "This is the first story in the book and, thematically, the keynote." Social commentator Sandy English considers "Largesse of the Sea Maiden" as "the most effective piece in the collection" and notes that the "self-indulgent free-for-all" that characterized Johnson's short stories in the collection Jesus' Son (1992), are largely absent here.

J. Robert Lennon also recognizes the change in outlook that "The Largesse of the Sea Maiden" signals:

These vignettes set the tone for the longer stories to come; they invite the reader to observe without judgment extremes of personality and behavior. There is also the gentleness of the adman's narration, which carries over into the rest of the [collection of stories]; the mature Johnson, while still preoccupied with characters downtrodden, marginalized, angry, and insane, has come to view them with a greater sense of compassion.

Critic Kevin Zambrano issues this caveat: "If a Jesus’ Son fan picks up The Largesse of the Sea Maiden looking for more of the same, [the title story] will thwart that expectation, both in its cobbled form and morose content."

== In popular culture ==
The story is referenced in the season 3 finale episode of Industry. Eric Tao delivers a rousing speech to his colleagues at the bank, part of which he later admits was stolen word-for-word from this short story. The episode title "Infinite Largesse" also draws from the name of the story.

== Sources ==
- Corbett, Gavin (February 17, 2018). "The Largesse of the Sea Maiden by Denis Johnson review: sublime last book". The Irish Times.
- Domestico, Anthony (January 11, 2018). "A dark world in gem-like sentences". The Boston Globe.
- English, Sandy (January 15, 2019). "The Largesse of the Sea Maiden—Short stories by American author Denis Johnson". World Socialist Web Site.
- Giraldi, William (January 22, 2018). "Denis Johnson is gone, but he left us one last sublime collection of stories". The Washington Post.
- Gold, Hannah (January 12, 2018). "Denis Johnson and the Ghost of Elvis Presley". The Village Voice. Archived from the original on March 28, 2018.
- Lennon, J. Robert (May 9, 2018). "The Intersection of Souls". The Nation.
- Jollimore, Troy (January 11, 2018). "Denis Johnson's legacy of grace evident in new, posthumous story collection". Chicago Tribune.
- Zambrano, Kevin (January 10, 2018). "Less Brilliant But More Profound: Denis Johnson's The Largesse Of The Sea Maiden". The Rumpus.
