= Triumph Over the Grave =

- Short story by Denis Johnson
- Country: United States
- Language: English

Publication
- Published in: The Largesse of the Sea Maiden
- Publisher: Random House
- Publication date: January 16, 2018

"Triumph Over the Grave" is a short story by Denis Johnson first appearing in his collection The Largesse of the Sea Maiden published in 2018 by Random House.

== Plot ==
"Triumph Over the Grave" is a discursive journey composed of vignette-like episodes, perhaps autobiographical or fictional. The unnamed narrator, a writer in his sixties living in San Francisco, recounts the lives - and deaths - of now-deceased friends, literary associates, and mentors.

The story opens with an incident at a restaurant involving a case of mistaken identity: the narrator confuses a red-headed woman for Nan, the spouse of his friend Robert, both of whom live in New York City. A phone call leads to the narrator's discovery that Robert had died suddenly that morning. The news leaves the narrator profoundly shaken.

The narrator, who in his youth led a precarious existence, describes his early efforts to become a successful author. He announces to the reader, "I'll write a story for you right now" which he titles "The Examination of My Right Knee", a tale concerning a failed operation for his trick knee, during which he was hallucinating on LSD.

The critical vignettes of the story relate the narrator's role as a witness to the death struggles of two elderly literary associates: Darcy Miller and "Link" Linkwits. Miller descends into madness— or perhaps enlightenment—as he succumbs to lung cancer. Linkwits, who the narrator had served as a caregiver and personal secretary, is defiant and stoic to the end before dying from cancer. Neither man goes gently into the night.

The story closes with the narrator's report that Nan, Robert's widow, had suddenly died after a short illness. The narrator writes: "It doesn't matter. The world keeps turning. It's plain to you that at the time I write this, I'm not dead. But maybe by the time you read it."

== Theme ==
"Triumph Over the Grave" is a final testament to Johnson's career as a writer, a memoir of his struggles all of which are "linked by the death of friends." Critic David L. Ulin emphasizes the revealing, memoir-like elements of the story:

"Triumph Over the Grave" occupies the center of The Largesse of the Sea Maiden, and not only because it begins in the exact middle of the book. Rather, this is a narrative that—not unlike the collection as a whole—evokes Johnson as he is and as he was: author, teacher, moral being, lost soul adrift in an indifferent universe."

Author Troy Jollimore comments on the relationship between theme and style in the story:

"Triumph Over the Grave" is a reflection on mortality, in which a writer reflects on the lives and, more particularly, the deaths of people he has known. Here, and also in the title story, Johnson's narration moves unpredictably (but never haphazardly) between various plotlines that are united not by conventional standards of causation and chronology but by theme and dream logic.

Jollimore adds that " "Triumph Over the Grave", in essence,...gestures toward the deepest mysteries of our existence on this planet."

Critic Gavin Corbett observes that in "Triumph Over the Grave', the narrator traces over a stream of past events, but here he is literally writing his memories out—what we're reading is his testament to these personally significant episodes, all linked by the deaths of friends."

Johnson provides a striking image of death, symbolized by circling turkey vultures, noted by Corbett:

"The Triumph Over the Grave" contains the collection's most powerful image: approaching the remote country home of a dying fellow writer, our narrator notices an ominous swirl of vultures which, nonetheless, looks "no more substantial than burning pages."

Social commentator Sandy English remarks upon the same passage: "On one visit [to Miller's ranch], there are buzzards in the sky…We hear the 'demoralized lowing of distant cattle' and the narrator says, 'I saw nothing, really … to suggest that anybody cared what went on here or even knew of the existence of this place.' This seems to catch the feeling of many places in America today."

Johnson was dying of liver cancer when he completed his 2018 collection of short fiction, and he closes "Triumph Over the Grave" with this: "The world keeps turning. It plain to you at the time I write this, I'm not dead. But maybe by the time you read it."

Critic Kevin Zambrano observes that "In the story's final lines, the narrator's all-but-explicit evocation of his author takes a startling, haunting turn."

Author David L. Ulin, commenting on the collection that includes "Triumph Over the Grave" writes:

The Largesse of the Sea Maiden [is] inspired less by the impending demise of its creator than by the more general condition of mortality the writer and the reader share.

== Sources ==
- Corbett, Gavin (February 17, 2018). "The Largesse of the Sea Maiden by Denis Johnson review: sublime last book". The Irish Times.
- Domestico, Anthony (January 11, 2018). "A dark world in gem-like sentences". The Boston Globe.
- English, Sandy (January 15, 2019). "The Largesse of the Sea Maiden—Short stories by American author Denis Johnson". World Socialist Web Site.
- Giraldi, William (January 22, 2018). "Denis Johnson is gone, but he left us one last sublime collection of stories". The Washington Post.
- Jollimore, Troy (January 11, 2018). "Denis Johnson's legacy of grace evident in new, posthumous story collection". Chicago Tribune.
- Lennon, J. Robert (May 9, 2018). "The Intersection of Souls". The Nation.
- Ulin, David L. (Spring 2018). "Seeker: Denis Johnson and the Literature of Last Things". Virginia Quarterly Review. Vol. 94, no. 1. Illustrated by Patrick Bremer. Archived from the original on March 5, 2018.
- Zambrano, Kevin (January 10, 2018). "Less Brilliant But More Profound: Denis Johnson's The Largesse Of The Sea Maiden". The Rumpus.
