= After This =

2006 novel by Alice McDermott

- First edition
- Author: Alice McDermott
- Language: English
- Subject: Sexual revolution Parenting
- Publisher: Farrar, Straus and Giroux
- Publication date: September 5, 2006
- Publication place: USA
- Media type: Print
- Pages: 279
- ISBN: 978-0-374-16809-4
- OCLC: 173961805
- Preceded by: Child of My Heart

After This is a 2006 novel by American author Alice McDermott. The novel follows a working-class American family who reside on Long Island, New York and their four children, who are enduring their own experiences during the times of the sexual revolution. It is set during the mid-20th century, a time after the end of World War II, through to the presidency of Richard Nixon.

The book received many positive reviews from critics, often commenting on the writing styles of McDermott. The Pittsburgh Post-Gazette commented that the storyline is "sophisticated in design, spare like an elegant entrée at a fine restaurant." The book was highlighted among the 100 Notable Books of the Year of The New York Times.

== About the author ==
Alice McDermott was born in Brooklyn, New York on June 27, 1953. In 1975, McDermott received her B.A. from the State University of New York and her M.A from the University of New Hampshire in 1978. She began writing at an early stage in her life, although her first novel, A Bigamists' Daughter, was not published until 1982. In 1987, McDermott was a recipient of the Whiting Writers Award for her novels, several of which had been finalists for the Pulitzer Prize or winners of the National Book Award.

== Content ==
The book is set on Long Island, New York, shortly after the ending of World War II. Mary Rose, a lonely, thirty-year-old woman with the responsibility of looking after her father and brother, leaves Church on an April day in the 1940s. She goes to a Schrafft's outlet and becomes acquainted with a man there ordering food. When she sees him there the next day, the pair begin dating and eventually marry. Together, they have four children. Their first three children, Jacob, Michael, and Annie live with their parents in an Irish-Catholic community on Long Island.

Their fourth child, Clare, is delivered by a neighbor of the family in the lounge of their house as a hurricane is heading towards the Eastern Seaboard. The book follows the family through the 1960s and 1970s, as the children enter adolescence and discover themselves during the changing times of the 1960s and the Sexual Revolution. The Keane children, on entering early adulthood, begin to break away from their family and religious backgrounds. Jacob, the eldest child, serves in Vietnam and is killed in the French trenches. Michael moves away from Long Island and goes to study in a college in northern New York, but later turns to sex and drugs. Meanwhile, Annie, the bookworm of the family, leaves to study in England, but quickly changes her plans after meeting a man on a bus whom she likes. Clare, the youngest, returns from a summer vacation to her former Catholic high school, showing a changed personality and increased self-confidence.

== Reception ==
The Washington Post commented that "in After This there is no excess, no look-at-me pyrotechnics in her prose; with the mastery of a poet, she distills the life of the Keanes to its essence." A review by The Chicago Tribune noted that "It is hard to know how to start piling on the praise for this gripping, poignant book. It would seem there is no technique of fiction McDermott has not mastered. Like the masters, she makes it look effortless." Writing for the New York City-circulated The Wall Street Journal, Kate Flatley LaVoie praised the book, praised the book, writing: "Through sharp, funny, heartbreaking and breathtaking vignettes, Ms. McDermott conveys the family's evolution (and America's too) — from John and Mary's first meeting at a diner in postwar New York City through the children's traditional Catholic school youth in the 1950s to the inevitable turbulence of the 1960s."

USA Today wrote "McDermott's prose is stunning yet emotionally cool," adding: "While it fails as a cohesive novel, After This shines in its small moments, much like a story collection." Entertainment Weekly described it as a "lovely needlepoint of a novel." The Economist reviewed the book positively, writing "After This is more than a book about an influential time in history and its effect on those living through it. In its portrayal of the emotions that hold people and families together—the loyalties and frustrations, the sorrows and joys—this quietly unusual novel is ultimately about what it is to be human."

== See also ==
- Irish-Americans
