= Jincy Willett =

American author and writing teacher

Jincy Willett is an American author and writing teacher currently living in San Diego, California. She has written short pieces for various anthologies and periodicals including The Norton Anthology of Contemporary Fiction, Children Playing Before a Statue of Hercules (Simon and Schuster Paperbacks, 2005), Funny Ha Ha, 80 of the funniest stories ever written, edited and selected by Paul Merton (Head of Zeus Ltd., 2019), and Issues 22 and 56 of Timothy McSweeney's Quarterly Concern. Her first book, a collection of short stories called Jenny and the Jaws of Life, was initially published in 1987 to critical acclaim but smaller-than-expected sales. The public admiration of Willett's writing expressed by David Sedaris, however, had the book in reprint in 2002, garnering praise from critics and public alike.

Her novel Winner of the National Book Award: A Novel of Fame, Honor, and Really Bad Weather, was published in 2002. The Writing Class, a Novel was published in 2008 by Macmillan's Picador imprint and is a mystery and the first novel in a trilogy, including Amy Falls Down, published by Thomas Dunne Books in July 2013, and Amy Among the Serial Killers, published by St. Martin's Press in August 2022.

== Bibliography ==
=== Short Story Collection ===
Jenny and the Jaws of Life (Re-published again with foreword by David Sedaris)

=== Novels ===
- Winner of the National Book Award (Published in the UK as Fame and Honour)
- The Writing Class: A Novel
- Amy Falls Down: A Novel
- Amy Among the Serial Killers: A Novel
