= Bark (short story collection) =

2014 short story collection by Lorrie Moore

Bark: Stories
- Author: Lorrie Moore
- Language: English
- Genre: Fiction
- Publisher: Alfred A. Knopf
- Publication date: 2014
- Pages: 192
- ISBN: 9780307594136
- OCLC: 840937255

Bark (2014) is a short story collection by American author Lorrie Moore.

== Reception ==
Bark was short-listed for the Story Prize in 2014. The collection was also short-listed for the Frank O'Connor International Short Story Award and was among Publishers Weekly's Top 10 Books of 2014.

The Washington Post book reviewer Heller McAlpin described the volume as a "powerful collection about the difficulty of letting go of love."
