= Ling Ma =

American novelist and academic

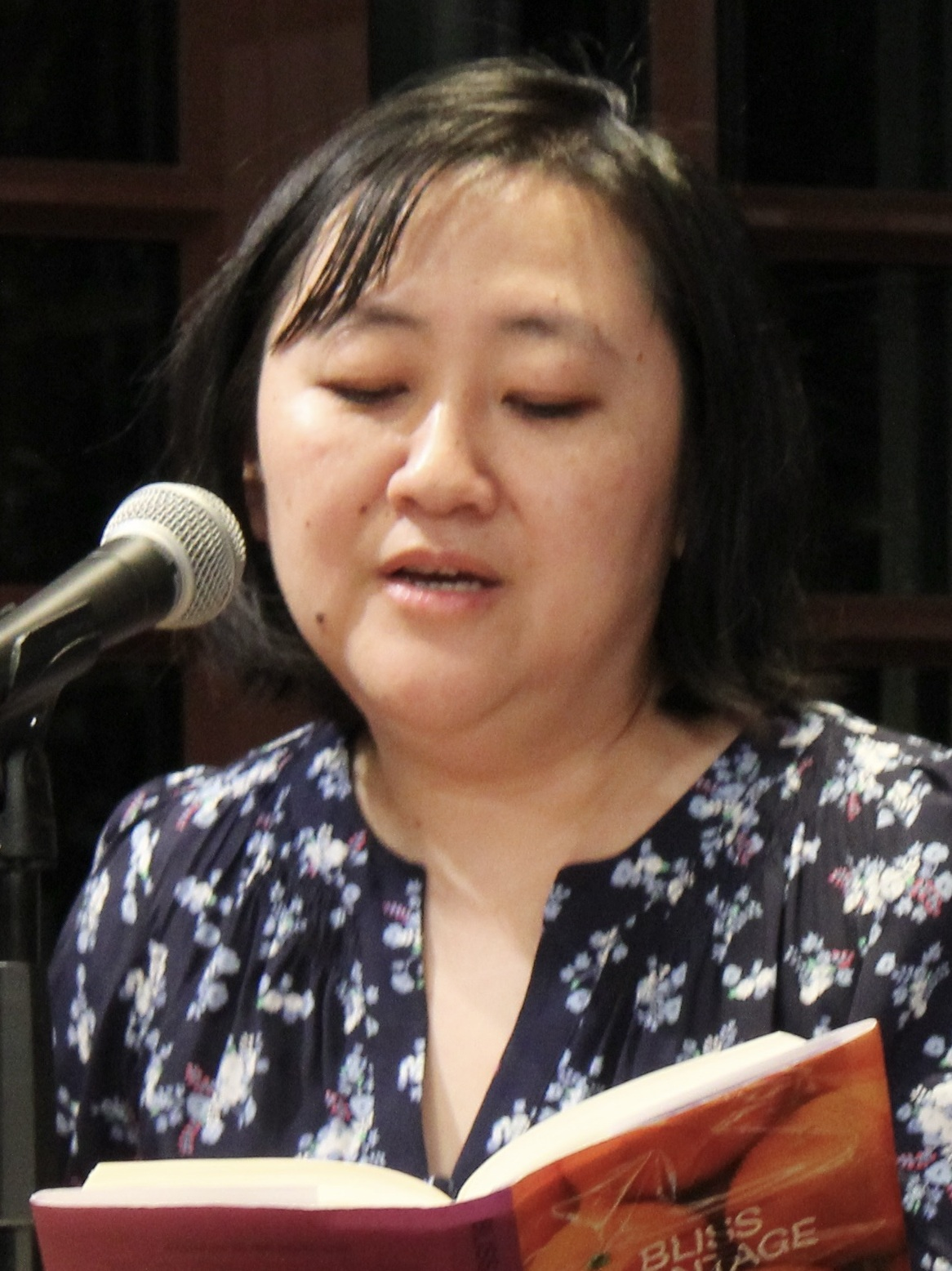
- Ling Ma in 2023
- Born: Sanming, Fujian, China
- Occupations: Writer, professor
- Known for: Severance
- Awards: Kirkus Prize; Windham-Campbell Literature Prize; Story Prize

Academic background
- Education: University of Chicago (AB); Cornell University (MFA)

Ling Ma is an American novelist and associate professor at the University of Chicago. Her first book, Severance, won the Kirkus Prize in 2018 and was listed as a New York Times Notable Book of 2018 and shortlisted for the PEN/Hemingway Award. Her second book, Bliss Montage (2022), won the National Book Critics Circle Award for Fiction and The Story Prize. She is a 2024 MacArthur Fellow.

== Early life ==
Ma was born in Sanming, Fujian, China, initially an only child because of China's "one-child policy." She grew up in Utah, Nebraska, and Kansas. She has an AB from the University of Chicago and received an MFA from Cornell University.

== Career ==
Ma's debut novel, Severance, is described as "a biting indictment of late-stage capitalism and a chilling vision of what comes after, but that doesn’t mean it’s a Marxist screed or a dry Hobbesian thought experiment." Severance is a novel that is partially post-apocalyptic horror, and partially office satire. It follows the novel's narrator in the aftermath of the outbreak of a deadly fever that has killed almost everyone in the US. An earlier chapter from the book won a 2015 Disquiet Literary Prize, the Graywolf Prize.

Ma began the novel while working as a fact checker for Playboy, a job she held from 2009 to 2012. It began as a short story, written in her office during her last few months there; after her layoff, it became a novel which she wrote while living on severance pay. She took four years to write it, and finished the novel at Cornell as part of the work in her MFA program. Ma said she "felt pressured to write a traditional immigration novel" while in the MFA program at Cornell, but instead decided to write about otherness and alienation via the trope of zombie apocalypse.

Ma has also published short stories in Granta, Playboy, and the Chicago Reader. Ma's short story "Peking Duck" appears in the 2022 The New Yorker Fiction Issue. Her first collection of short stories, Bliss Montage, was published in September 2022. The collection won the National Book Critics Circle Award in Fiction.

She is the recipient of a 2023 Windham–Campbell Literature Prize for Fiction.

== Works ==
=== Books ===
- —— (2018). Severance: A Novel. Farrar, Straus and Giroux. ISBN 9780374261597.
- —— (2022). Bliss Montage. Farrar, Straus and Giroux. ISBN 9780374293512.

=== Stories ===
| Year | Title | Publication | Collected in |
|---|---|---|---|
| 2011 | "Life Plans at 27" | "Life Plans at 27". Wigleaf. 2011. | — |
| 2012 | "The Scientist" | "The Scientist". Ninth Letter. 17. Spring–Summer 2012. | — |
| 2012 | "Yeti Lovemaking" | "Yeti Lovemaking". Unstuck. 2. 2012. | Bliss Montage |
| 2014 | "Fuzhou Nighttime Feeling" | "Fuzhou Nighttime Feeling". The Texas Observer. October 2014. | from Severance |
| 2015 | "Los Angeles" | "Los Angeles". Granta (132). Summer 2015. | Bliss Montage |
| 2020 | "G" | "G". Zoetrope: All-Story. 24 (1). Spring 2020. | Bliss Montage |
| 2022 | "Office Hours" | "Office Hours". The Atlantic. May 16, 2022. | Bliss Montage |
| 2022 | "Tomorrow" | "Tomorrow". Virginia Quarterly Review. 98 (3). Summer 2022. | Bliss Montage |
| 2022 | "Peking Duck" | "Peking Duck". The New Yorker. July 11, 2022. | Bliss Montage |
| 2022 | "Oranges" | — | Bliss Montage |
| 2022 | "Returning" | — | Bliss Montage |
| 2023 | "Winner" | "Winner". The Yale Review. 111 (4). Winter 2023. | — |
