= Jean Thompson (author) =

American novelist (born 1950)

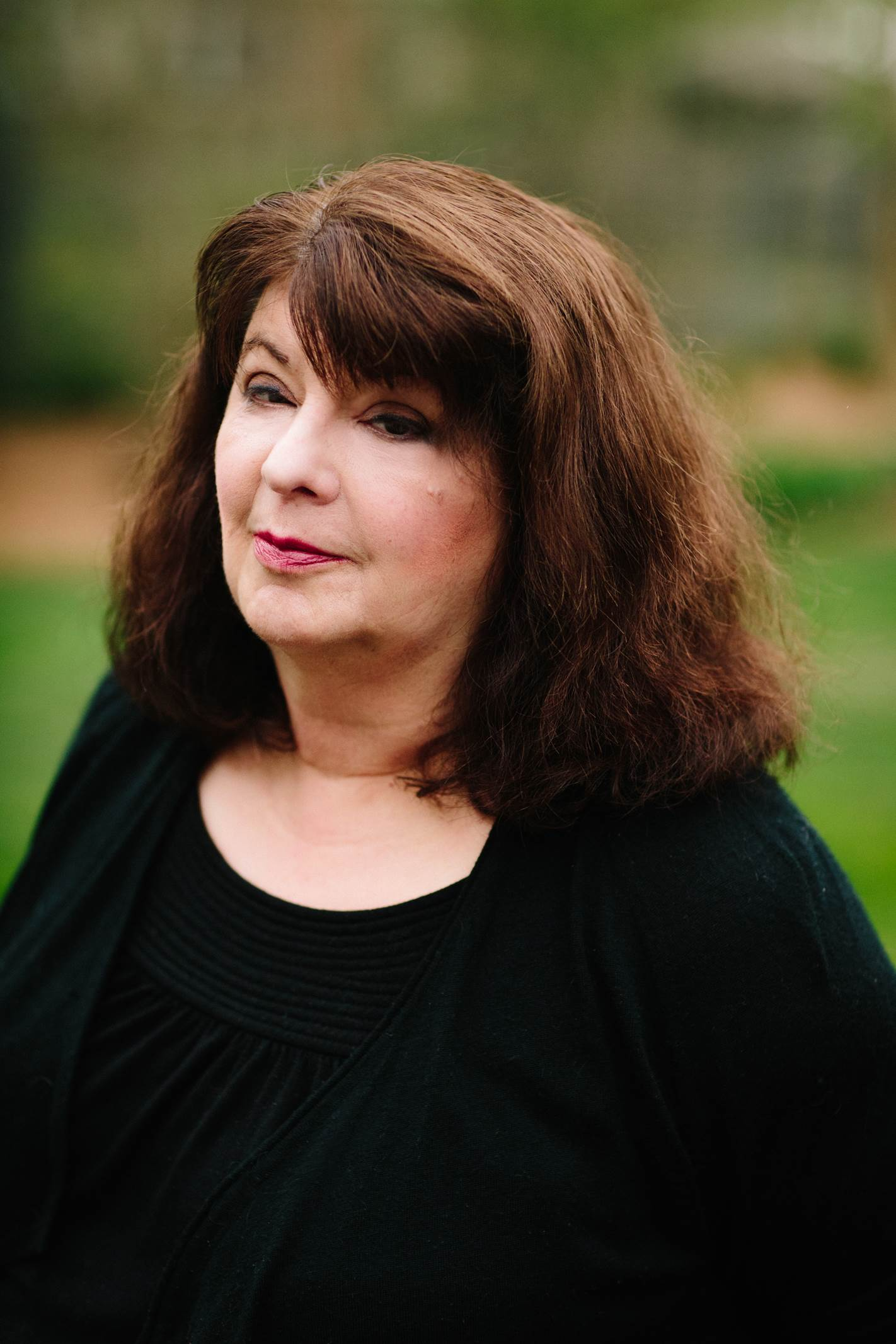
- Born: January 3, 1950 (age 76); Chicago, Illinois, U.S.
- Education: University of Illinois Urbana-Champaign; Bowling Green State University (MFA)
- Occupation: Writer
- Awards: National Book Award (Finalist) Guggenheim Fellowship Pushcart Prize Best American Short Stories
- Website: jeanthompsononline.com

Jean Thompson (born January 3, 1950) is an American novelist, short story writer, and teacher of creative writing. She lives in Urbana, Illinois, where she has spent much of her career, and is a professor emerita at the University of Illinois Urbana-Champaign, having also taught at San Francisco State University, Reed College, and Northwestern University.

== Early life, education, and career ==
Jean Thompson was born in Chicago, Illinois, and during her childhood the family lived briefly in Louisville, Kentucky and Memphis, Tennessee. She received her undergraduate degree from the University of Illinois Urbana-Champaign, and an MFA from Bowling Green State University. Her first stories were published in little magazines while she was still in her early twenties, and not long after that she began to be published in more visible venues, such as Ploughshares and The New Yorker. Her stories have appeared in The Best American Short Stories series, beginning with the 1979 edition.

== Literary themes and style ==
Thompson "often writes about the difficulties and complexities of love," and her work "focuses on the lives of ordinary people, often women, living in the overlooked center" of the United States.

== Bibliography ==
=== Novels ===
- My Wisdom: A Novel (1982), F. Watts (ISBN 978-0531098707)
- Wide Blue Yonder (2001), Simon & Schuster (ISBN 978-0743205122)
- City Boy (2004), Simon & Schuster (ISBN 978-0743242820)
- The Year We Left Home (2011), Simon & Schuster (ISBN 978-1439175880)
- The Humanity Project (2013), Blue Rider Press (ISBN 978-0399158711)
- She Poured Out Her Heart (2016), Blue Rider Press (ISBN 978-0399573811)
- A Cloud in the Shape of a Girl (2018), Simon & Schuster (ISBN 978-1501194368)
- The Poet's House (2022), Algonquin Books (ISBN 978-1643751566)

=== Story collections ===
- Gasoline Wars (1982), University of Illinois Press (ISBN 978-0252007828)
- Who Do You Love (1999), Simon & Schuster (ISBN 978-0151004164)
- Throw Like A Girl: Stories (2007), Simon & Schuster (ISBN 978-1416541820)
- Do Not Deny Me: Stories (2009), Simon & Schuster (ISBN 978-1416595632)
- The Witch: And Other Tales Re-Told (2014), Simon & Schuster (ISBN 978-0399170584)

=== Notable stories ===
- "Applause, Applause." First appeared in Ploughshares (1977), and selected for the collections Matters of Life and Death (1983), edited by Tobias Wolff (ISBN 9780931694141, 0931694140), and Children Playing Before a Statue of Hercules (2005), edited by David Sedaris (ISBN 0-7432-7612-4)
- "Paper Covers Rock." First appeared in Mademoiselle, and selected for The Best American Short Stories 1979, edited by Joyce Carol Oates.
- "Remembering Sonny." Selected for The Random Review 1982, edited by Gary Fisketjon and Jonathan Galassi. (ISBN 9780394523552, 0394523555)
- "Fire Dreams." Published in The New Yorker, October 31, 1988.
- "The Little Heart." Published in The New Yorker, January 27, 1992.
- "All Shall Love Me and Despair." First published in Mid-American Review, and selected for The Best American Short Stories 1996, edited by John Edgar Wideman.

=== Other writing ===
- "All Things Come to an End. Even My 2001 Saturn." New York Times, March 20, 2016
- "Introduction." Ploughshares, Issue 123 (Spring 2014)

== Awards and honors ==
- 1978: National Endowment for the Arts Literature Fellowship
- 1984: Guggenheim Fellowship
- 1999: Finalist, National Book Award for Fiction (for Who Do You Love)
- 2009-2010: The Best American Short Stories and Pushcart Prize (both for "Wilderness")
