= The Largesse of the Sea Maiden =

2018 short story collection by Denis Johnson

The Largesse of the Sea Maiden: Stories
- First edition cover
- Author: Denis Johnson
- Cover artist: Debbie Glasserman
- Language: English
- Publisher: Random House
- Publication date: January 16, 2018
- Publication place: United States
- Media type: Print (hardcover and paperback)
- Pages: 224
- ISBN: 978-0-8129-8863-5 (First edition hardcover)
- OCLC: 986937986
- Dewey Decimal: 813/.54
- LC Class: PS3560.O3745 A6 2018

The Largesse of the Sea Maiden: Stories is a 2018 short story collection by Denis Johnson. It was published posthumously on January 16, 2018, by Random House. It consists of five short stories, three of which were previously published in The New Yorker and Playboy. Johnson finished the collection a few weeks before his death in May 2017.

The book was a finalist for the 2018 National Book Critics Circle Award for Fiction.

== Contents ==
- "The Largesse of the Sea Maiden"
- "The Starlight on Idaho"
- "Strangler Bob"
- "Triumph Over the Grave"
- "Doppelgänger, Poltergeist"

== Publication history ==
Of the five stories in The Largesse of the Sea Maiden, three already appeared in print:

"The Largesse of the Sea Maiden" was originally published in the March 3, 2014, issue of The New Yorker magazine.

"The Starlight on Idaho" was originally published in different form in the February 2007 issue of Playboy magazine.

"Strangler Bob" was originally published posthumously in the October 23, 2017, issue of The New Yorker.

The other two stories in the collection, "Triumph Over the Grave" and "Doppelganger, Poltergeist" appeared for the first time in the collection The Largesse of the Sea Maiden.

Johnson completed works in The Largesse of the Sea Maiden while he was dying of liver cancer in 2017. The collection was published posthumously by Random House on January 16, 2018.

== Audiobook ==
For the audiobook, each of the five stories were read by a different actor. "The Largesse of the Sea Maiden" is read by Nick Offerman, "The Starlight on Idaho" by Michael Shannon, "Strangler Bob" by Dermot Mulroney, "Triumph Over the Grave" by Will Patton, and "Doppelgänger, Poltergeist" by Liev Schreiber.

== Reception ==
Publishers Weekly gave the collection a rave review, deeming it "an instant classic" and calling it "a masterpiece of deep humanity and astonishing prose."

Maureen Corrigan of NPR praised the collection, singling out "The Largesse of the Sea Maiden" and "Doppelgänger, Poltergeist" as "out-of-this-world" and concluding that the collection "contains the kind of work every writer would like to go out on: fresh, profound and singular. It affirms literature's promise to believers, the gift of eternal voice."

== Critical assessment ==
The posthumous publication of Johnson's second collection of short stories elicited both critical praise and regret at the author's passing. Gavin Corbett of The Irish Times welcomed The Largesse of the Sea Maiden as "a major event in American letters."

Sandy English of the World Socialist Web Site regarded the collection as "perhaps Johnson's best work" in which the themes "responded, in his own way, to the changes in American life in the last quarter century."

William Giraldi of The Washington Post placed Johnson among the masters of 20th-century short story writers: "Ernest Hemingway, Flannery O'Connor and Raymond Carver."

Critic Troy Jollimore remarks on the significance of the volume's title:

The word largesse isn't much used anymore. Perhaps it refers to a kind of profound and liberal bounteousness that isn't often to be observed in American life today. But it's a perfect word to describe Johnson's fiction, which overflows with creative energy, moving from one beauty to another with a mercurial, at times almost chaotic grace. Although his characters are often diminished and winnowed by their struggles with life, the narrative voice that describes their travails gives evidence of an imagination that is nearly boundless in its generosity and abundance.

== Theme ==
Themes that invoke "God" and religion appear as key elements in Johnson's final volume of short stories. Social critic Sandy English writes: "It is not a surprise that mystical and semi-religious elements, always present in Johnson's work, are more pronounced in Largesse of the Sea Maiden." Johnson's narratives in The Largesse of the Sea Maiden emphasize the ineluctable advent of death.

"I don't think in terms of themes—or think in any terms, really. I'm making what T.S. Eliot called 'quasi-musical decisions.' I'm just improvising and adapting, and in that case I suspect the story's course reflects the process of trying to make it...I get in a teacup and start paddling across the little pond and say, 'In seven weeks, I'll land on Mars.' Five years later I'm still going in circles. When I reach the shore within spitting distance of where I started, it's a colossal triumph."—Denis Johnson in a 2014 email to literary critic David L. Ulin

Author Kevin Zambrano writes: "This grimy religiosity is more in keeping with Jesus' Son, but like every story in The Largesse of the Sea Maiden, it is also fixated on death. The narrator believes he can defy it, which scans as more crazy chatter, but isn't belief in eternal life the crux of Christianity?" Author David L. Ulin comments on themes that address "mortality" in Johnson's final literary work:

The Largesse of the Sea Maiden represents...the general condition of mortality the writer and the reader share... Where it leaves us, then, is not with testament so much as with a sliver of the author's living soul. I'm referring to pragmatics, not theology...Johnson balances wonder and degradation; transcendence and despair.

Critic Aaron Thier defines the literary function of "God" in Johnson's The Largesse of the Sea Maiden:

Whatever "God" meant to Johnson in his private life, "God" in his fiction is a way of referring to those aspects of human experience that seem excessive or out of scale...At the same time this "God" is an aspect of reality: an extraordinary vision is the product of ordinary experience. Eternity, in Johnson's work, is something you can hold in your hand and throw against the wall. It is also a thing that can throw you against the wall...

== Comparison-Contrast: Jesus' Son and The Largesse of the Sea Maiden ==
Johnson's short story oeuvre consists of two collections: Jesus' Son (1992), comprising 11 works of short fiction, and The Largesse of the Sea Maiden (2018), published posthumously 25 years after his first collection and containing 5 stories. The volumes have elicited commentary by a number of critics on their respective styles and themes. Author David L. Ulin argues that the collections defy comparison.

The stories in both collections are written exclusively from the first-person point-of-view. While the pieces in Jesus' Son are told by the same youthful narrator, a drug addict identified as "Fuckhead", The Largesse of the Sea Maiden presents a number of unique narrators. Several settings and characters appear in both collections. Critic Kevin Zambrano notes that "like "Beverly Home," "The Starlight on Idaho" takes its name from a rehab clinic, and Dundun, a character from Jesus' Son, reappears in "Strangler Bob" as part of a triad of jailhouse companions" in The Largesse of the Sea Maiden.

Three of the stories in the 2018 collection diverge from Jesus' Son in that Johnson presents "aging bourgeois professionals, dislocated less from society...Gone are flying women, flowers from Andromeda, crazy explanations for everything. What's left is a vast sense of bewilderment." Social critic Sandy English offers a similar assessment:

In The Largesse of the Sea Maiden, the world, on the surface, is more stable than in either Jesus' Son or the novel Tree of Smoke (2007). Rather than a self-indulgent free-for-all, or a devastating war, there are in these stories the confines of jobs, rehab centers, even—perhaps symbolically—prison.

"People die in Jesus' Son, most of them on accident; in The Largesse of the Sea Maiden, they're murdered, they hang themselves, their corpses are exhumed by mad poets. If Jesus' Son dazzles with the mind-expanding perceptions it draws from the world, The Largesse of the Sea Maiden seem to see, as Wallace Stevens put it, "Nothing that is not there and the nothing that is." Perhaps this point-of-view comes from proximity to death. Certainly with that comes self-consciousness, and The Largesse of the Sea Maiden has a reflexive dimension that Jesus' Son lacks."—Kevin Zambrano in The Rumpus (2018)

Stylistically, Johnson maintains the same excellence in crafting his sentences. Critic Anthony Domestico writes: "The main thing linking The Largesse of the Sea Maiden to Jesus's Son are his sentences...it's the sentences—those adamantine, poetic sentences—that made him one of America's great and lasting writers. It's the sentences that live on." Geoff Dyer admires "the slipshod magnificence and crazy wonder of the Johnsonian sentence. Clause by clause, word by word, anything becomes plausible."

Kevin Zambrano qualifies his praise for Johnson's sentence structure: "More dissimilar than the collections' subject matter are their styles. Despite the greater length of the new stories [in The Largesse of the Sea Maiden], Johnson's sentences have grown more economical, even prosaic." Zambrano suggests that Johnson has traded "brilliance" for "profundity" in these final stories.

== Sources ==
- Corbett, Gavin (February 17, 2018). "The Largesse of the Sea Maiden by Denis Johnson review: sublime last book". The Irish Times.
- Domestico, Anthony (January 11, 2018). "A dark world in gem-like sentences". The Boston Globe.
- Dyer, Geoff (December 31, 2017). "The Largesse of the Sea Maiden by Denis Johnson – review". The Guardian.
- English, Sandy (January 15, 2019). "The Largesse of the Sea Maiden—Short stories by American author Denis Johnson". World Socialist Web Site.
- Giraldi, William (January 22, 2018). "Denis Johnson is gone, but he left us one last sublime collection of stories". The Washington Post.
- Jollimore, Troy (January 11, 2018). "Denis Johnson's legacy of grace evident in new, posthumous story collection". Chicago Tribune.
- Ulin, David L. (April 28, 1991). "The Architecture of Madness". The Washington Post.
- Thier, Aaron (2018). "Denis Johnson's God". The Point. No. 17. Criticism.
- Ulin, David L. (October 30, 2014). "Denis Johnson's carefully arranged derangement". Los Angeles Times. Archived from the original on November 1, 2014.
- Ulin, David L. (Spring 2018). "Seeker: Denis Johnson and the Literature of Last Things". Virginia Quarterly Review. Vol. 94, no. 1. Illustrated by Patrick Bremer. Archived from the original on March 5, 2018.
- Zambrano, Kevin (January 10, 2018). "Less Brilliant But More Profound: Denis Johnson's The Largesse Of The Sea Maiden". The Rumpus.
