= Who Will Run the Frog Hospital? =

Book by Lorrie Moore

- First edition
- Author: Lorrie Moore
- Cover artist: Nancy Mladenoff
- Language: English
- Subject: Memory of childhood friendships
- Genre: Fiction
- Publisher: Knopf
- Publication date: 1994
- Publication place: United States
- Media type: Print (hardback & paperback)
- Pages: 160
- ISBN: 978-1-4000-3382-9
- Preceded by: Anagrams (1986)
- Followed by: A Gate at the Stairs (2009)

Who Will Run the Frog Hospital? is the second novel by American author Lorrie Moore, published by Knopf in 1994. The novel was inspired by a drawing of the same name by Nancy Mladenoff. While visiting an art gallery, Moore saw Mladenoff's drawing, which she bought and later used for her novel's title. The novel addresses both adolescence and middle age through the eyes of Berie, a girl from upstate New York. Moore uses memory as a narrative tool, inviting the reader to follow Berie's recollections, and demonstrates the imperfections and compromises required by daily life. The novel was well received in the United States, earning favorable reviews.

== Plot summary ==
The novel is narrated by Benoite-Marie "Berie" Carr. While vacationing in Paris with her husband Daniel, Berie recalls her adolescence in Horsehearts, New York. During the summer of 1972, Berie worked with her friend Silsby Chaussee (Sils) at Storyland, an amusement park where she sold tickets and Sils played Cinderella. The adult Berie, now a photographic curator at a local historical society, narrates the pitfalls of her marriage while searching for the close bond she shared with Sils during the Storyland summer.

As a child, Berie lived with her parents, brother Claude, and adopted sister LaRoue. Her parents hosted numerous guests, ranging from visiting academics to exchange students; this gave Berie "a tin ear for languages" and made it difficult for her to understand "foreignness, code, mood". Berie and Sils made friends with their co-workers at Storyland and saved frogs from teenage boys until Sils began dating Mike, a local boy with a motorcycle. Mike dominated Sils' time, leaving Berie out and confused by her absence. When Sils became pregnant, Berie stole money from the Storyland register to pay for an abortion.

In between recollections of Horsehearts, Berie details her troubles with Daniel. Recently, they fought and he pushed her down the stairs of their apartment, resulting in a damaged hip. Daniel is distant from Berie, and she seeks companionship from friends like Marguerite, a Parisian artist, but is ultimately unable to recreate the closeness of her relationship with Sils.

After Sils' abortion, Berie noticed her manager watching her at odd times. An accident on a ride in the park temporarily forestalled exposure, but she was eventually caught and fired. Baptized by Reverend Filo at a summer camp, she explored organized religion before finally getting her period late in adolescence. Sent to a boarding school, she achieved academic success and was astonished by her own physical development. Berie and Sils later met at a high school reunion but found that their relationship changed as they face middle age. Berie pays a last visit to LaRoue, who later commits suicide after being institutionalized for years, and the novel ends as Berie settles for comfortable distance from Daniel and her past.
