= A Gate at the Stairs =

Novel by Lorrie Moore

- Author: Lorrie Moore
- Language: English
- Genre: Fiction
- Published: 2009 (Random House)
- Publication place: United States
- Media type: Print (hardback & paperback)
- Pages: 322
- ISBN: 978-0-375-70846-6
- OCLC: 347878482
- Dewey Decimal: 813.54
- LC Class: PS3563.O6225

A Gate at the Stairs is a novel by American fiction writer Lorrie Moore. It was published by Random House in 2009. The novel won Amazon.com's "best of the month" designation and was a finalist for the PEN/Faulkner Award and the Orange Prize for Fiction.

== Plot summary ==
The novel's main character is Tassie Keltjin. At age 20, Keltjin is attending a major university identified only as the "Athens of the Midwest." When the novel opens, she is looking for a job as a nanny. With no real childcare experience, she finds that the only mother willing to hire her is Sarah Brink. The hitch is that Sarah does not yet actually have a child. This doesn't stop her from hiring Keltjin anyway. Soon Tassie finds herself embroiled in the Brink family's attempts to adopt a biracial child who eventually goes by the name "Emmie".

Now a college student and a nanny, Tassie starts a relationship with a man named Reynaldo whom she met in one of her classes. Reynaldo tells her that he is Brazilian. She thinks it's odd that when he purports to use Portuguese, he actually speaks Spanish. Later, Reynaldo ends the affair, informing her that he is suspected of terrorist activities and must disappear. In saying goodbye, Reynaldo tells her he is not actually Brazilian. When she asks where he is from, he answers "Hoboken, New Jersey." Though Reynaldo denies being part of a cell he says that "It is not the jihad that is the wrong thing. It is the wrong things that are the wrong things" and then he quotes Muhammed.

Following a fostering period of several months, during which the Brinks and Tassie bond closely with the child, the adoption proceedings go awry when it is discovered that the Brinks lost their biological child many years earlier in a bizarre highway accident. It emerges that Edward punished his four-year-old son for misbehavior by making him get out of the car at a highway rest stop. The distraught boy then walked onto the highway, where he was killed by an oncoming vehicle. Tassie mourns the loss of Emmie who is taken back into foster care.

Within a few weeks, she is also mourning the death of her brother Robert. Having failed to succeed academically and be accepted to a four-year college, Robert enlists in the United States Army and attends boot camp at Fort Bliss. He is killed in Afghanistan almost immediately after boot camp. Tassie blames herself for his death when she discovers, amidst her email, an unread note from him asking for her advice on whether to enlist. The Keltjins are further devastated when the army issues multiple and conflicting accounts of how Robert died. Tassie spends a medical leave of absence from school recovering at her parents' small farm, but she returns to college in November of the next academic year.

The novel closes on a telephone call in which Sara Brink's husband Edward tells Tassie that he and his wife have split up. He then invites Tassie to have dinner with him. Tassie addresses the reader directly, saying she declined to meet him even for a cup of coffee and the novel ends on the words, "That much I learned in college."

There are multiple theories about the meaning of the book's title. Michael Gorra writes that it refers to the child safety gates that people put at the top of staircases to keep children from toppling down the stairs. Michiko Kakutani, on the other hand, believes the book's title refers to a song Tassie wrote which includes the lyric "I’d climb up that staircase/past lions and bears,/but it’s locked/at the foot of the stairs." However, there is also a gate at the front of the Brink house that takes on symbolic significance as Tassie first approaches the house. The gate is slightly off its hinges, and Tassie notes mentally "it should have communicated itself as something else: someone’s ill-disguised decrepitude, items not cared for properly but fixed repeatedly in a make-do fashion, needful things having gotten away from their caregiver."

== Composition and publication history ==
Since 1984, Lorrie Moore has been teaching literature and writing at the University of Wisconsin at Madison where she holds the Delmore Schwartz Professorship in the Humanities. It's tempting to extrapolate that Moore has drawn heavily on her experiences with college students in creating Tassie Keltjin. However Moore generally rejects the idea that her work is ever at all autobiographical: “I don’t have an interesting enough life for a memoir—unless I get to fudge and exaggerate and lie. But then that’s fiction. As for personal exposure in fiction, well, sure. One has to be brave. There is always a little personal exposure ... and more than that there is the illusion of personal exposure, which may have the same annoying repercussions,” she said in a 2005 interview with The Believer Magazine. In the same interview, Moore declined to discuss her upcoming novel. But she did comment: “everything is political, and I am interested in power and powerlessness as it relates to people in various ways. I’m also interested in the way that the workings of governments and elected officials intrude upon the lives and minds of people who feel generally safe from the immediate effects of such workings” which has obvious applications to the military recruitment and death of the novel's Robert Keltjin and his family's inability to get a straight answer from the army about how he died. Telegraph Writer Helena de Bertodano notes that Moore's own adopted son is African American which mirrors the attempted adoption of Emmie by the white Brink family in the novel. In the same Telegraph article, Moore states “'I wanted to describe what it is like to be a white person raising an African-American in this country. People look at you a little differently; you seem to be part of a different history.” In her novel, an unidentified white parent of an African-American child says, “Do you get those looks in the aisles when you’re with your kid? That look that says I see you’ve been messing around with colored people—we hope you’re paying cash”. In the same article, de Bertodano notes that Moore's short story “People Like That Are the Only People Here: Canonical Babbling in Peed Onk” is also based on Moore's son's battle with cancer as a baby. In an interview she gave for Elle, Moore also admitted that the French restaurant in her novel was based in part on L’Etoile, a French restaurant in Madison, Wisconsin to which she sometimes takes her students for celebrations.

== Critical reception ==
A Gate at the Stairs has been recognized throughout the English-speaking world, garnering reviews in Canadian, Australian, and British publications as well as American. The Sydney Morning Herald declared it amongst 2009's "most highly anticipated novels" and Herald reviewer Kevin Rabalais compared Moore's writing to that of Mark Twain, Alice Munro, and William Trevor. The New York Times (NYT) reviewed the novel twice. NYT reviewer Michiko Kakutani praised Moore's development of the main character and, in particular, the novelist's exploration of "the limitations and insufficiencies of love, and the loneliness that haunts even the most doting of families." Two days later, The New York Times writer Jonathan Lethem offered the novel's author this reluctant praise: "She's a discomfiting, sometimes even rageful writer, lurking in the disguise of an endearing one." London Sunday Times reviewer Sophie Harrison heaped accolades on the novel, for the most part, finding it "unflaggingly tender and smart." Harrison noted, however, that the extreme quirkiness of the main character sometimes "limits the novel": "the quirkiness stifles deeper emotions and makes grief almost kitsch." Bookmarks Magazine says Moore's writing “occasionally suffers from its own excess” while less than believable characters and plotting are accompanied by “an overabundance of flat jokes and too-clever puns” (quoted on Amazon.com). The Toronto Sun review notes that the novel captures post–September 11, 2001 anxiety: "It takes place in a post 9/11 American world against which anger and paranoia, race and religion vie with the demands of everyday life. The self-doubt of the novel's protagonist echoes the self-doubt of a nation which had considered itself invulnerable."
