= Someone (McDermott novel) =

Book by Alice McDermott

Someone: A Novel
- First edition
- Author: Alice McDermott
- Language: English
- Genre: Fiction
- Publisher: Farrar, Straus and Giroux
- Publication date: September 10, 2013
- Publication place: United States
- Media type: Print (hardback & paperback)
- Pages: 240
- ISBN: 978-0-374-28109-0

Someone: A Novel is the seventh book of fiction by American author Alice McDermott. Published by Farrar, Straus and Giroux in 2013, it was a finalist for both the National Book Award and the National Book Critics Circle Award.

== Critical reception ==
- Kirkus Reviews gave it a starred review, summarizing that there's "no high drama here, but Marie and Gabe are compelling in their basic goodness."
- Writing in The New York Times, Janet Maslin praised the novel, stating Someone is a "wonderfully modest title for such a fine-tuned, beautiful book filled with so much universal experience, such haunting imagery, such urgent matters of life and death." Maslin later named Someone to her best of 2013 books list.
- Publishers Weekly gave Someone a starred review, calling it a "deceptively simple tour de force."
- The Los Angeles Times claimed, "Just as McDermott manages to write lyrically in plain language, she is able to find the drama in uninflected experience."

== Awards ==
Year	Award	Category	Result	Ref.
2013	National Book Award	Fiction	Longlisted	
2013	National Book Critics Circle Award	Fiction	Shortlisted	
2014	Dayton Literary Peace Prize	Fiction	Shortlisted	
2014	Maine Readers' Choice Award	—	Longlisted	
2014	Paterson Fiction Prize	Fiction	Shortlisted	
2015	International Dublin Literary Award	—	Shortlisted	
