= Charming Billy =

1997 novel by Alice McDermott

- Authors: Alice McDermott
- Language: English
- Genre: Literary fiction
- Publisher: Farrar, Straus and Giroux
- Publication date: December 1997—Early 1998
- Publication place: United States
- Media type: Print (hardcover, paperback), kindle, audiobook
- Pages: 280 pp
- ISBN: 9780374120801 (hardcover 1st ed.)
- OCLC: 38161224

Charming Billy is a novel by American author Alice McDermott. It tells the story of Billy Lynch, an Irish-American alcoholic who quietly struggles with depression after his first love's young death, and his large extended family. The novel was published by FSG in 1998 and has since been republished by Picador (as a Picador Modern Classic). It won the National Book Award for Fiction and the American Book Award, and was shortlisted for the International Dublin Literary Award.

== Plot summary ==
The novel's nameless narrator begins the story at the funeral of her father's cousin, Billy Lynch, who died of alcoholism. Billy's large Irish-American extended family reminisces on his tragic life and good character; despite his struggles with alcoholism and the immense strain it put on his wife, Maeve, he is remembered as kind, faithful, and intelligent with a love for poetry, especially Yeats. Many recall Billy's fiancee Eva, an Irishwoman who died before they could marry. None know whether Maeve knew about Eva.

The narrator's father, Dennis, tells her the real story of Billy and Eva's relationship. Shortly after finishing their service in World War II, Dennis and Billy met her and her sister Mary at Dennis's stepfather's cottage on Long Island, where the sisters served as nannies for a wealthy Chicago couple. Billy quickly fell for Eva and took a significant loan from Dennis's stepfather to pay for her to come to the United States.

Dennis reveals that Eva is still alive: she had married another man, taken Billy's money to buy a gas station, and charged her sister Mary to relay the news to Dennis, with whom she (Mary) had a relationship. Distraught, Dennis ended his relationship with Mary and lied to Billy that Eva died.

The news led Billy deeper into depression and alcoholism; though he married Maeve (who did know about Eva) and remained faithful to her, he would often ponder her death while drunk and told Dennis that he struggled to understand God's mercy. For decades, Billy refuses to visit the cottage on Long Island, which Dennis's mother eventually rents to a man named Mr. West, who left his wife and children. Billy later discovers the truth while on a retreat to Ireland to take an abstinence pledge: while going to visit Eva's grave, he meets her in her family's gas station, where she confesses her guilt and embarrassment and offers to return the money. She further reveals that Mary refuses to speak to her; she never married and blames Eva for ruining her relationship with Dennis. Billy declines the money and quickly relapses into alcoholism, dying some years later.

The narrator reveals that she married Mr. West's son, Matthew, whom she met while they were both visiting the cottage--she had been telling Billy's story to Matthew throughout the novel. Their marriage eventually leads the West family to reconcile. Dennis, whose wife Claire died years before Billy, later marries Maeve and moves to the cottage.
