= Alice McDermott =

American writer, novelist, essayist (born 1953)

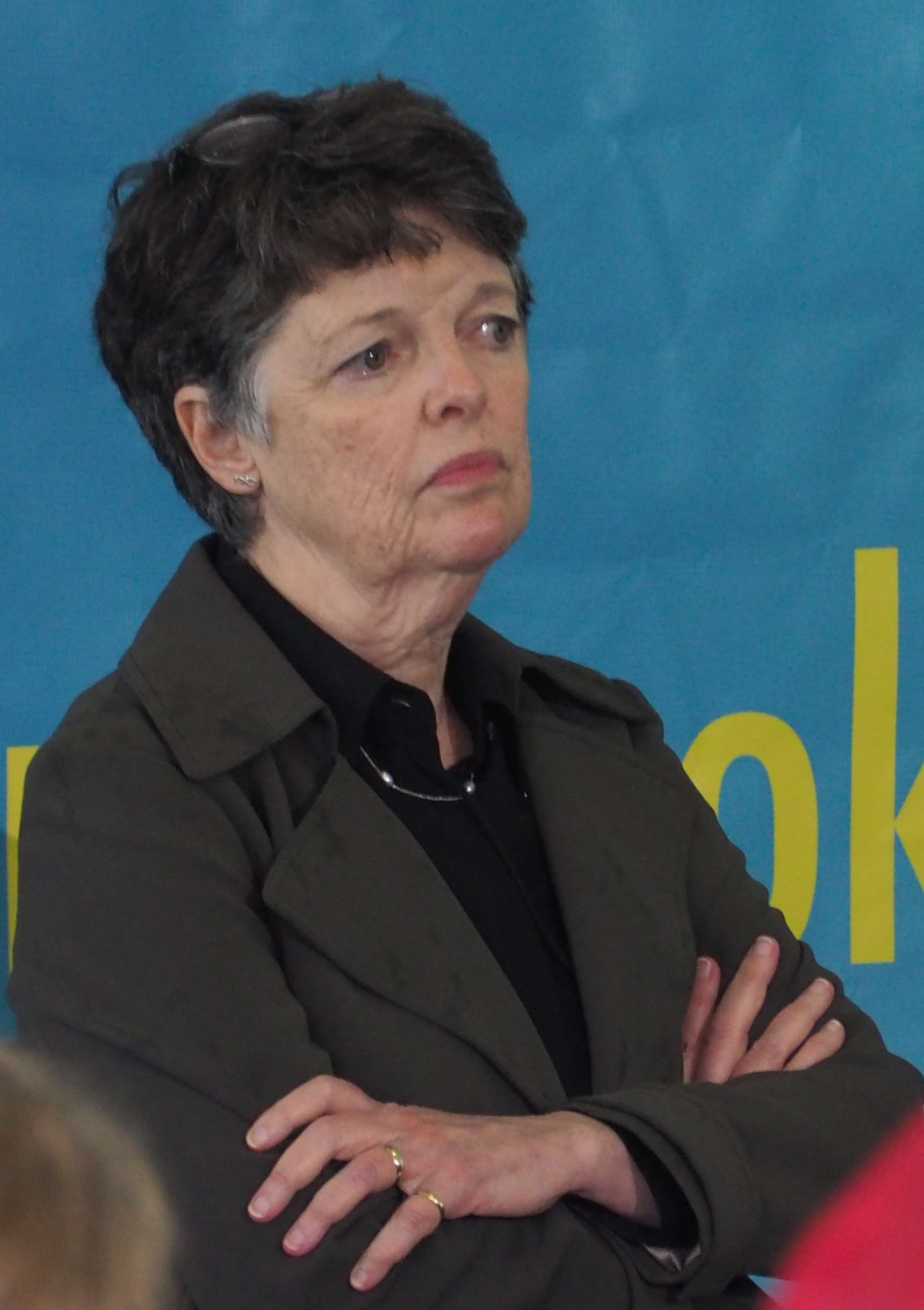
- McDermott at the 2024 Gaithersburg Book Festival
- Born: June 27, 1953 (age 73) Brooklyn, New York, U.S.
- Occupation: Novelist, essayist
- Education: State University of New York, Oswego (BA); University of New Hampshire (MA)
- Genre: Literary fiction

Website
- www.alice-mcdermott.com

Alice McDermott (born June 27, 1953) is an American writer and university professor. She is the author of nine novels and a collection of essays. For her 1998 novel Charming Billy she won an American Book Award and the U.S. National Book Award for Fiction and was a finalist for the International Dublin Literary Award and the Orange Prize. That Night, At Weddings and Wakes, and After This were finalists for the Pulitzer Prize for Fiction. Her most recent novel, Absolution was awarded the Mark Twain American Voice in Literature Award.

From 2002 to 2019, McDermott was the Johns Hopkins University's Richard A. Macksey Professor of the Humanities.

== Life ==
McDermott was born in Brooklyn, New York. She attended St. Boniface School in Elmont, New York, on Long Island (1967), Sacred Heart Academy in Hempstead (1971), and the State University of New York at Oswego, receiving her BA in 1975, and received her MA from the University of New Hampshire in 1978.

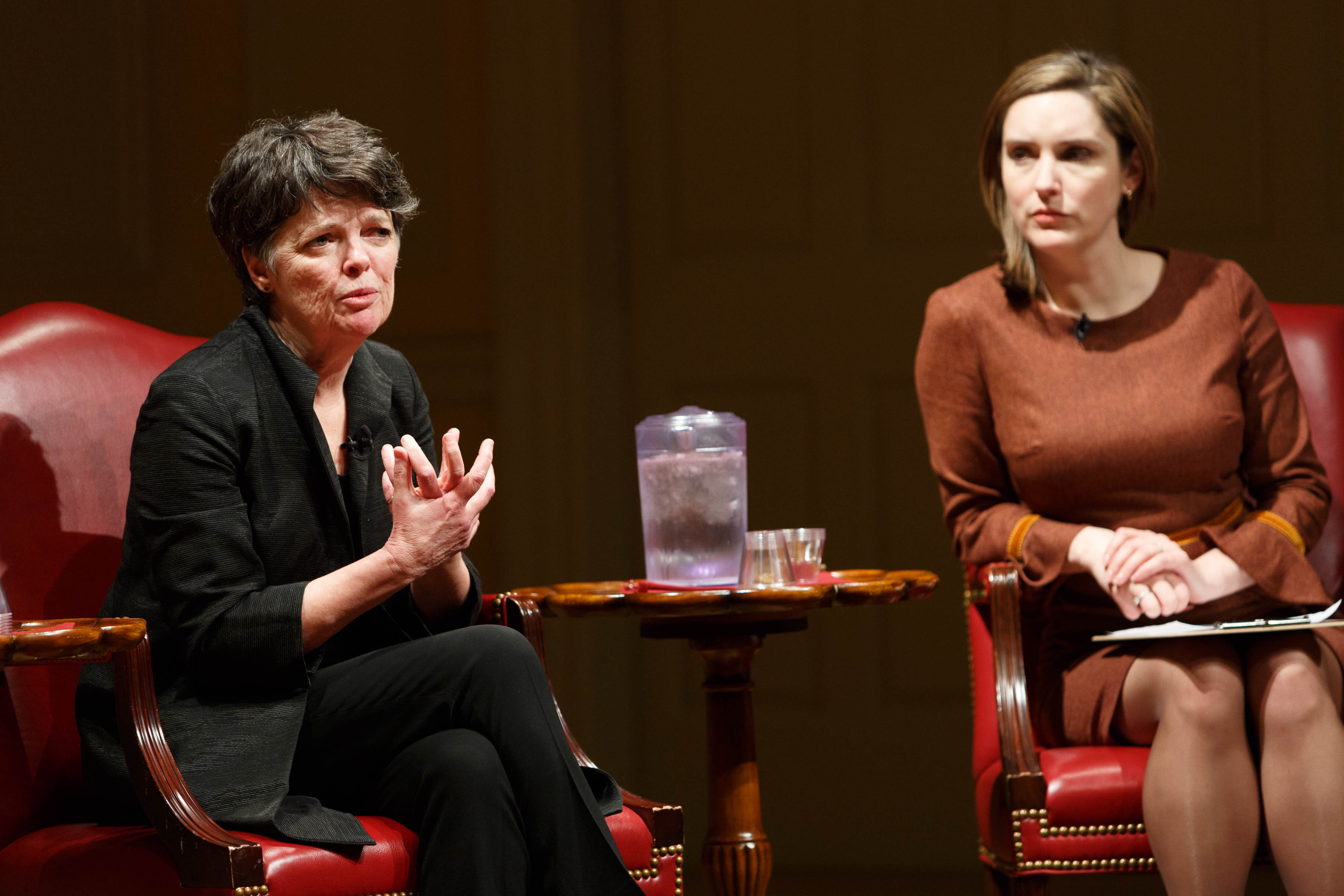
McDermott (left) speaking in 2020

She is the recipient of several honorary degrees including Boston College, Georgetown University School of Continuing Studies, University of New Hampshire, SUNY Oswego, Mount St. Mary's University, La Salle University, Regis College, The College of the Holly Cross.

She has taught at UCSD and American University, has been a writer-in-residence at Lynchburg College and Hollins College in Virginia, and was lecturer in English at the University of New Hampshire. In 2012 she was the D'Angelo Scholar-in-Residence, St. John's University. From 2002 to 2019, McDermott was the Richard A. Macksey Professor of the Humanities at Johns Hopkins University. For two decades McDermott served on the faculty of Sewanee Writers Conference. Her short stories have appeared in Harper's Bazaar, Commonweal, The Sewanee Review, Ms., Redbook, Mademoiselle, The New Yorker, Good Housekeeping, and Seventeen. She has also published articles in The New York Times and The Washington Post.

McDermott lives outside Washington, D.C., with her husband, a neuroscientist, and three grown children. She is Catholic, though she once deemed herself "not a very good Catholic."

== Awards and honors ==
=== Literary awards ===
Year	Title	Award	Category	Result	Ref.
1987	That Night	Los Angeles Times Book Prize	Fiction	Finalist	
1987	That Night	National Book Award	Fiction	Finalist	
1988	That Night	PEN/Faulkner Award for Fiction	—	Finalist	
1988	That Night	Pulitzer Prize	Fiction	Finalist	
1992	At Weddings and Wakes	Pulitzer Prize	Fiction	Finalist	
1998	Charming Billy	National Book Award	Fiction	Won	
1999	Charming Billy	American Book Award	—	Won	
2000	Charming Billy	International Dublin Literary Award	—	Finalist	
2000	Charming Billy	Women's Prize for Fiction	—	Finalist	
2002	Child of My Heart: A Novel	International Dublin Literary Award	—	Longlisted	
2006	After This	Pulitzer Prize	Fiction	Finalist	
2007	After This	Audie Award	Literary/Classics	Finalist	
2013	Someone	National Book Award	Fiction	Longlisted	
2013	Someone	National Book Critics Circle Award	Fiction	Finalist	
2014	Someone	Dayton Literary Peace Prize	—	Finalist	
2015	Someone	International Dublin Literary Award	—	Shortlisted	
2017	The Ninth Hour	Kirkus Prize	Fiction	Finalist	
2017	The Ninth Hour	National Book Critics Circle Award	Fiction	Finalist	
2018	The Ninth Hour	Andrew Carnegie Medals for Excellence	Fiction	Longlisted	
2018	The Ninth Hour	Prix Femina étranger	—	Won	
2019	The Ninth Hour	International Dublin Literary Award	—	Longlisted	
2024	Absolution	Mark Twain American Voice in Literature Award	—	Won	
2024	Absolution	PEN/Faulkner Award for Fiction	—	Finalist	

=== Honors ===
- 1987 – Whiting Award
- 2004 – Gaudium Prize
- 2008 – Corrington Award for Literature
- 2010 – Fitzgerald Prize for Literary Excellence
- 2013 – Inducted into the New York Writers Hall of Fame
- 2015 – Mary McCarthy Award, Bard College
- 2019 – Seamus Heaney Award for Literature, Glucksman Ireland House
- 2024 – Inducted into the American Academy of Arts and Letters
- 2024 – Recipient of the Eugene O'Neil Lifetime Achievement Award

== Selected works ==
=== Novels ===
- —— (1982). A Bigamist's Daughter. New York: Random House.
- —— (1987). That Night. Farrar, Straus and Giroux. ISBN 9781429929745.
- —— (1992). At Weddings and Wakes: A Novel. Farrar, Straus and Giroux. ISBN 9781429929622.
- —— (1998). Charming Billy. Farrar, Straus and Giroux. ISBN 9781429929707.
- —— (2002). Child of My Heart (paperback 1st ed.). Farrar, Straus and Giroux. ISBN 9781408806678.
- —— (2006). After This. Farrar, Straus and Giroux. ISBN 9780440337300.
- —— (2013). Someone. Farrar, Straus and Giroux. ISBN 9780374281090.
- —— (2017). The Ninth Hour: A Novel. Farrar, Straus and Giroux. ISBN 9780374280147.
- —— (2023). Absolution: A Novel. Farrar, Straus and Giroux. ISBN 9780374610487.

=== Essays ===
- —— (2021). What About the Baby?. Farrar, Straus and Giroux. ISBN 9780374130626.
