= Severance (novel) =

2018 novel by Ling Ma

- First edition cover
- Author: Ling Ma
- Language: English
- Genre: Post-apocalyptic fiction
- Publisher: Farrar, Straus and Giroux
- Publication date: August 14, 2018
- Publication place: United States
- Media type: Hardback
- Pages: 304
- ISBN: 978-0-374-26159-7

Severance is a 2018 post-apocalyptic novel by Chinese American author Ling Ma. It follows Candace Chen, an unfulfilled Bible product coordinator, before and after an incurable infection slowly obliterates global civilization. Severance explores themes of nostalgia, modern office culture, monotony, and intimate relationships. The novel, Ma's debut, won the 2018 Kirkus Prize for Fiction and was included on many prominent Best Books of 2018 lists.

== Setting ==
Severance takes place in an alternate history of the United States up to the end of 2011, before and during a pandemic of the Shen Fever, a fictional fungal infection caused by Sheniodioides originating in Shenzhen, China. Real world events such as Occupy Wall Street unfold differently due to the Shen Fever pandemic.

People infected with Shen Fever repeat old routines compulsively, without consciousness and until death. There is no cure for the fever, and its spread eventually leads to total societal collapse in the United States. Some people are inexplicably immune to the fever and try to survive during the slow apocalypse.

== Plot ==
The narrative follows Candace Chen after societal collapse due to the Shen Fever pandemic and in flashbacks to her earlier life. Candace and her parents emigrate from Fuzhou, China to Salt Lake City in her youth. In her twenties, Candace drifts through New York City, living on her inheritance from her parents following their deaths, before acquiring an unfulfilling job at a Manhattan-based publishing company called Spectra, overseeing the overseas production of elaborate design variations of the Bible. In the early days of the pandemic in 2011, Candace discovers she is pregnant after splitting with her boyfriend, Jonathan, who is disillusioned with the city, consumerism, and capitalism, and plans to sail to Puget Sound.

As businesses shut down as the pandemic worsens, Candace accepts a lucrative contract with Spectra to be one of the few to continue to work in the office until a certain date, because keeping the main office open is good for the company's image. Having only distant relatives in China, Candace feels little impetus to flee the city as most others do to be with family. Eventually she is the only employee left and is no longer contacted by her superiors. Per Jonathan's parting suggestion to revive her old pursuits in photography, she documents the final days of a deserted New York City's collapsing infrastructure on a blog called NY Ghost, which outlasts major publications and news outlets. When shocked by the realization that she has fulfilled her work contract, Candace is one of the final survivors to escape the city in late 2011.

In the present, a group of other immune survivors finds Candace near death in a New York taxi cab on the shoulder of a highway in Pennsylvania. The quasi-religious group, under the domineering leadership of Bob, is traveling towards "the Facility," which Bob promises to be safe. On the way there, the group follows Bob's rituals to "stalk" houses for supplies, killing (“releasing”) any living fevered people inside. A member of the group who was seemingly healthy succumbs to Shen Fever while visiting her childhood home, leading Candace to theorize that nostalgia is somehow related to the mindless routines of the fevered.

The survivors arrive to find that the Facility is an abandoned shopping mall in suburban Illinois, which Bob co-owns and spent much of his youth in, and begin to make a new home there. As punishment for rebellion and due to the discovery of Candace's pregnancy, Bob imprisons her. Candace begins to hallucinate the presence of her dead mother, who helps her realize that her safety is only ensured until the birth of her baby. When Candace finds Bob, now fevered, in his nightly routine of walking around the mall, she is able to steal his keys and escape. Candace takes a car and heads for Chicago, planning for the future.

== Characters ==
- Candace Chen: A young woman originally from Fuzhou, Fujian province, China, residing in New York when Shen Fever strikes. Employed at a publishing company called Spectra, Candace is the production assistant in the Bible department. She is also a photographer and secret creator of the NY Ghost blog.

=== Pre-pandemic ===
- Jonathan: Candace's boyfriend for most of the five years she lives in New York City. Jonathan is a disillusioned free spirit, who temps and freelances for enough money to get by. He aspires to write fiction. Leaves the city for Puget Sound.
- Ruifang Yang: Candace's mother. Worked as an accountant in China, before moving to the U.S. for her husband's graduate degree.
- Zhigang Chen: Candace's father, an insurance analyst.
- Jane: Candace's NYU roommate who works in fashion.
- Blythe: a Spectra employee in the Art Books department and Candace's former Bibles colleague. She flees Manhattan with Delilah for Connecticut before fulfilling the terms of the lucrative skeleton crew contract.
- Lane: Senior Product Coordinator in Art at Spectra. Becomes fevered.
- Seth: Candace's boss, the Senior Product Coordinator of Gifts and Specialty at Spectra.
- Manny: Doorman at Spectra.
- Michael Reitman: CEO of Spectra.
- Steven Reitman: an author with whom Candace hooks up. He helps her get the Spectra job through his connection with the CEO. Ultimately becomes fevered.
- Carole: Human Resources at Spectra.
- Delilah: a Spectra employee in the Art Books department.
- Balthasar: an operations director at Phoenix Sun and Moon Ltd.
- Edgar: The secondary operations director at Phoenix Sun and Moon Ltd.

=== During the pandemic ===
- Eddie: A taxi driver who drives Candace to the Spectra offices.

=== Post-pandemic ===
- Robert "Bob" Eric Reamer: A former I.T. guy who has become the ruthless, quasi-religious leader of the traveling survivor group.
- Janelle Sasha Smith: A brave, thoughtful survivor who befriends Candace. She is killed by Bob when she attempts to shield a fevered Ashley.
- Adam Patrick Robinson: A member of the survivor group.
- Evan Drew Marcher: One of the small subgroup of survivors who makes a pact to splinter from the main group. He overdoses on Xanax at the Facility.
- Rachel Sara Aberdeen: A member of the survivor group who serves as Candace's guard at the Facility.
- Genevieve Elyse Goodwin: A member of the survivor group.
- Ashley Martin Piker: A member of the survivor group who becomes fevered when she returns to her childhood home. She is later killed by Bob.
- Todd Henry Gaines: A member of the survivor group.

== Themes ==
The New York Times' review stated that Severance, "offers blatant commentary on 'dizzying abundance' and unrelenting consumption, evolving into a semi-surreal sendup of a workplace and its utopia of rules." Ling Ma began the novel while working as a fact checker for Playboy, a job she held from 2009 to 2012. It began as a short story, written in her office during her last few months there; after her layoff, it became a novel which she wrote while living on severance pay. She took four years to write it, and finished the novel at Cornell as part of the work in her MFA program. She said that she watched George Romero films while working on Severance, and also The Walking Dead.

Ma said she "felt pressured to write a traditional immigration novel" while in the MFA program at Cornell, but instead decided to write about otherness and alienation via the trope of zombie apocalypse. Ma's main character is, like her, a first generation immigrant. The New York Times review states that "laced within its dystopian narrative is an encapsulation of a first-generation immigrant’s nostalgia for New York."

== Reception ==
It was a New York Times Notable Book of 2018. NPR's Michael Schaub said it is, "A fierce debut from a writer with seemingly boundless imagination" and "A stunning, audacious book with a fresh take on both office politics and what the apocalypse might bring." The Chicago Tribune called it, "a gripping bildungsroman in the midst of an apocalypse."

It was included on annual Best Book lists at Elle, Marie Claire, Refinery29, BuzzFeed, BookPage, Bookish, Mental Floss, Huffington Post, A.V. Club, Jezebel, and Vulture. Electric Literature included it on a list of possible winners for the 2019 Pulitzer Prize for Fiction.

BookPage called it an "astounding debut novel." Refinery29 included it on "These Post-Apocalyptic Books Will Freak You Out", saying, "Ma creates a convincing portrait of woman slightly disconnected from the world, even before the virus."

=== Awards ===
Year	Award	Category	Result	Ref.
2018	CHIRBy Awards	—	Shortlisted	
2018	Goodreads Choice Awards	Science Fiction	Nominated	
2018	Kirkus Prize	Fiction	Won	
2019	Aspen Words Literary Prize	—	Longlisted	
2019	BookTube Prize	Fiction	Shortlisted	
2019	Friends of American Writers Award	Adult Literature	Won	
2019	Locus Award	First Novel	Shortlisted	
2019	PEN/Hemingway Award	—	Shortlisted	
2019	VCU Cabell First Novelist Award	—	Won	
2019	Young Lions Fiction Award	—	Shortlisted	
2020	International Dublin Literary Award	—	Longlisted	
