= I Am Homeless if This Is Not My Home =

2023 novel by Lorrie Moore

- Author: Lorrie Moore
- Language: English
- Genre: Fiction
- Publisher: Alfred A. Knopf
- Publication date: 2023
- Pages: 193
- ISBN: 9780307594143
- OCLC: 1322836490

I Am Homeless if This Is Not My Home is a 2023 novel by American novelist Lorrie Moore. It was her fourth published novel, and was the winner of the 2023 National Book Critics Circle Award (NBCC Award) in Fiction.

== Synopsis ==
A man goes on a road trip with his dead ex-girlfriend.

== Critical reception ==
Vox wrote "This is a strange and beautiful book, and when you try to catch it in your hands, it dissolves."

Upon receiving the 2023 NBCC Award for Fiction, the NBCC committee declared that:

“I Am Homeless if This Is Not My Home is a heartbreaking and hilarious ghost story about a man who considers what it means to be human in a world infected by, as Moore puts it, ‘voluntary insanity.’ It’s an unforgettable achievement from a landmark American author.”
