= Birds of America (short story collection) =

1998 collection of short stories by Lorrie Moore

- First edition
- Author: Lorrie Moore
- Language: English
- Genre: Short Stories
- Publisher: Knopf
- Publication date: 1998
- Media type: Print (hardback & paperback)
- ISBN: 0-679-44597-8
- OCLC: 41565236

Birds of America (1998) is a collection of short stories by American writer Lorrie Moore.

The stories in this collection originally appeared in The New Yorker, Elle, The New York Times, and The Paris Review.

== Accolades ==
- New York Times bestseller (a rarity for a short story collection)
- Included in the 1998 New York Times Book Review books of the year list in 1998
- Winner, Irish Times International Fiction Prize.
- Village Voice book of the year (1998)
- Winner, Salon Book Award
- The story "People Like That Are the Only People Here" won an O. Henry Award (1998)

== Contents ==
Birds of America contains the following short stories:

- Willing

A 40 something year old, washed up Hollywood actress moves to Chicago and takes up residence at a Days Inn. She is unsatisfied with what her life has become. She has missed the opportunity, she feels, to have a partner and children. She is alone and unhappy. She starts a relationship with a local car mechanic who she ultimately does not respect, but is still upset when he ultimately leaves her.

- Which Is More Than I Can Say About Some People

A mother and daughter travel to Ireland to kiss the Blarney Stone.

- Dance in America

The narrator travels through Pennsylvania Dutch Country teaching dance at local schools/colleges. While traveling she stops to visit an old college friend, his wife and 7-year-old son with Cystic fibrosis.

- Community Life
- Agnes of Iowa
- Charades
- Four Calling Birds, Three French Hens
- Beautiful Grade

A middle aged Law professor begins dating a 24-year-old student (to the dismay of his friends and colleagues). He later begins to fall for a middle aged woman, until he learns she is having an affair with his best friend. Depressed and suicidal he begins to write an essay titled The young were sent to earth to amuse the old. Why not be amused?

- What You Want to Do Fine
- Real Estate

"Ruth, who is dying of cancer, is no longer able to tolerate her husband's affairs. As part of her program of nuptial forensics, she fixes up a house, learns to fire a pistol and considers taking a lover, musing all the while on her illness: The healthy, the feeling well, when they felt that way, couldn't remember feeling any other, couldn't imagine it. They were niftily in their bodies. . . . Whereas the sick could only think of being otherwise. Their hearts, their every other thought, went out to that well person they hated a little but wanted to be. . . . The feeling well were running the show; which was why the world was such a savage place. Ruth doubts she has the audacity to act on these insights, yet when this gentle woman does commit an act of spectacular violence, she achieves no catharsis (though the reader feels great satisfaction). Ruth, in fact, may only have made herself sicker" (Taken from The New York Times review of Birds of America)

- People Like That Are The Only People Here: Canonical Babbling in Peed Onk

A mother and father (never named in the story) are thrust into the world of Pediatric Oncology (Peed Onk) upon the diagnosis of Wilm's tumor in their baby. This story was included in Children Playing Before a Statue of Hercules an anthology of short stories edited by David Sedaris and is loosely based on Moore's experience she had with her own son as a baby.

- Terrific Mother

A woman accidentally causes the death of her friend's baby, and after spending seven months holed up in her attic apartment, she is unable to move on - feeling that "normal" life is no longer possible for her. Further exacerbating her guilt is the fact that friends would often compliment her by stating she would make a "terrific mother".
