= Birds of North America (book) =

Encyclopedia of bird species

- Editor: Paul Rodewald
- Language: English
- Subject: Ornithology
- Publisher: Cornell Lab of Ornithology
- Publication place: United States
- Website: https://birdsna.org

Birds of North America is a comprehensive encyclopedia of bird species in the United States and Canada, with substantial articles about each species. It was first published as a series of 716 printed booklets, prepared by 863 authors, and made available as the booklets were completed from 1992 through 2003. The project was overseen by the American Ornithologists' Union in partnership with the Academy of Natural Sciences of Philadelphia.

In 2004, an online version of the encyclopedia, including audio and video resources, was produced and released by the Cornell Lab of Ornithology. Access is by personal or institutional subscription.
