= Children Playing Before a Statue of Hercules =

2005 book edited by David Sedaris

- Editor: David Sedaris
- Language: English
- Genre: Short story collection
- Publisher: Simon & Schuster
- Publication date: August 1, 2005
- Publication place: United States
- Media type: Print (Paperback)
- Pages: 256 pp (first edition, paperback)
- ISBN: 0-7432-7612-4 (first edition, paperback)
- OCLC: 60512891

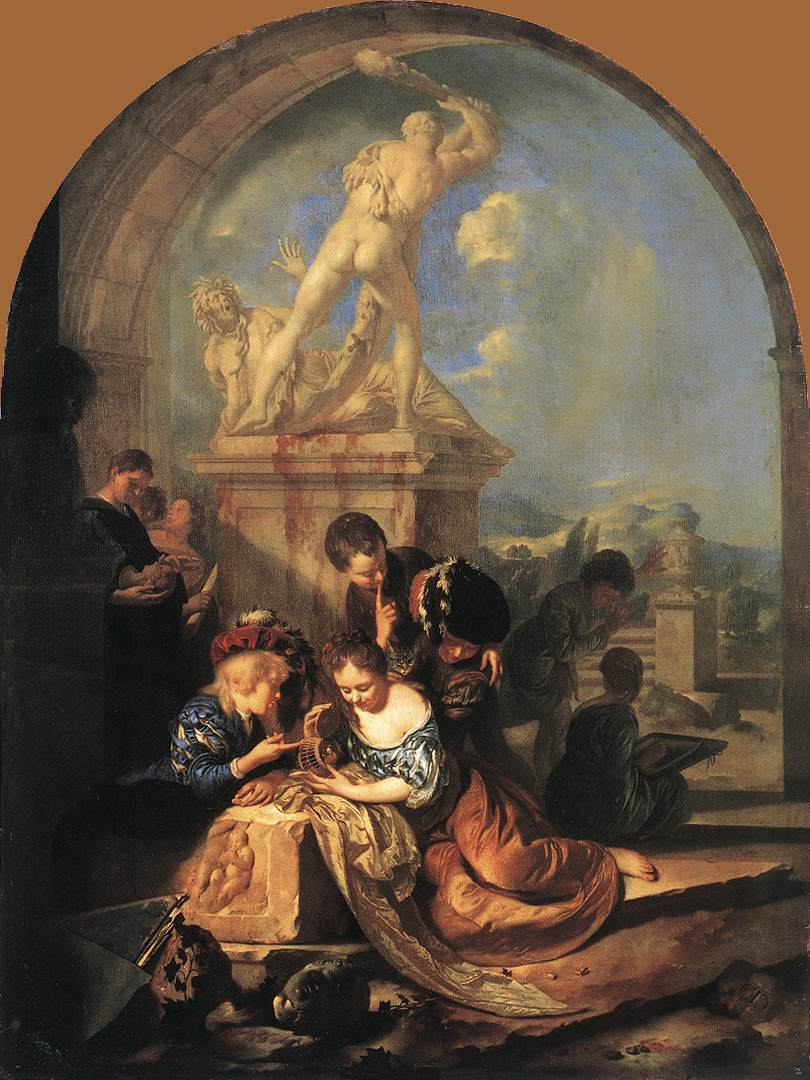
Adriaen van der Werff's 1687 work, Children Playing before a Hercules Group, inspired the title.

Children Playing Before a Statue of Hercules is a 2005 anthology of short stories edited by David Sedaris.

Sedaris published this book in order to support 826NYC, a nonprofit writing and tutoring center in Brooklyn, New York. All of his proceeds, after permission expenses, from Children Playing Before a Statue of Hercules will benefit this organization designed to help students ages six to eighteen develop their writing skills through free writing workshops, publishing projects, and one-on-one help with homework and English-language learning. In the book's epilogue, Sarah Vowell describes 826NYC's work.

The book's title references a painting by Adriaen van der Werff.

== Contents ==
- Introduction by David Sedaris
- "Oh, Joseph, I'm So Tired" by Richard Yates
- "Gryphon" by Charles Baxter
- "Interpreter of Maladies" by Jhumpa Lahiri
- "The Garden Party" by Katherine Mansfield
- "Half A Grapefruit" by Alice Munro
- "Applause, Applause" by Jean Thompson
- "I Know What I'm Doing About All the Attention I've Been Getting" by Frank Gannon
- "Where the Door Is Always Open and the Welcome Mat Is Out" by Patricia Highsmith
- "The Best of Betty" by Jincy Willett
- "Song of the Shirt, 1941" by Dorothy Parker
- "The Girl with the Blackened Eye" by Joyce Carol Oates
- "People Like That Are the Only People Here: Canonical Babbling in Peed Onk" by Lorrie Moore
- "Revelation" by Flannery O'Connor
- "In the Cemetery Where Al Jolson Is Buried" by Amy Hempel
- "Cosmopolitan" by Akhil Sharma
- "Irish Girl" by Tim Johnston
- "Bullet in the Brain" by Tobias Wolff
- Epilogue by Sarah Vowell
