= Lorrie Moore =

American fiction writer (born 1957)

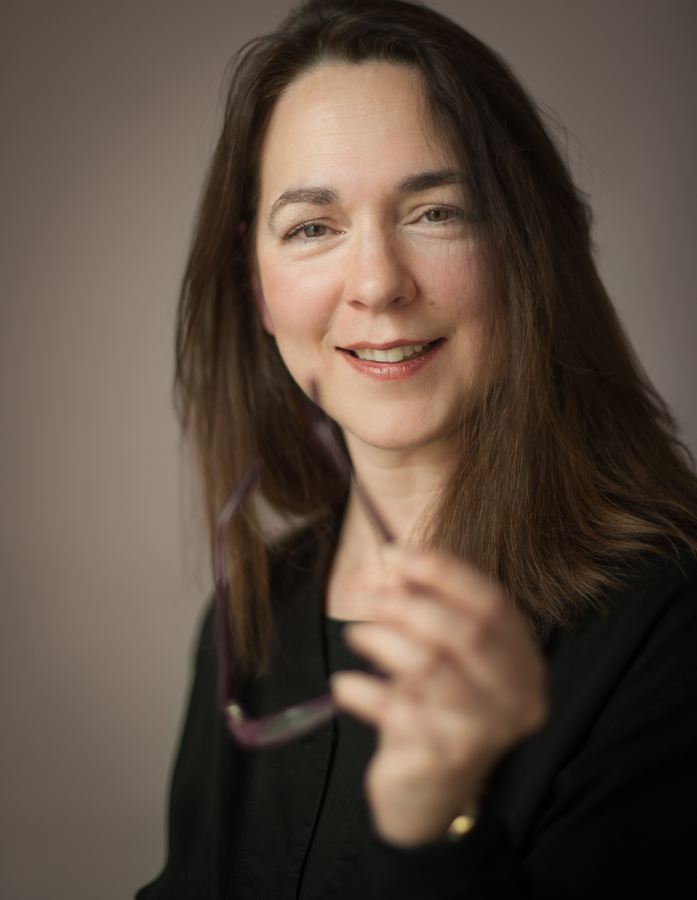
- Moore in 2014
- Born: Marie Lorena Moore; January 13, 1957 (age 69); Glens Falls, New York, U.S.
- Education: St. Lawrence University; Cornell University (MFA)
- Occupation: Writer
- Writing career
- Period: 1985–present
- Notable works: Who Will Run the Frog Hospital? (1994); Birds of America (1998); A Gate at the Stairs (2009); Bark (2014)
- Notable awards: American Academy of Arts and Letters, 2006

Lorrie Moore (born Marie Lorena Moore; January 13, 1957) is an American writer, critic, and essayist. She is best known for her short stories, some of which have won major awards. Since 1984, she has also taught creative writing.

== Biography ==
Marie Lorena Moore was born in Glens Falls, New York, and nicknamed "Lorrie" by her parents. She attended St. Lawrence University. At 19, she won Seventeen magazine's fiction contest. The story, "Raspberries," was published in January 1977. After graduating from St. Lawrence, she moved to Manhattan and worked as a paralegal for two years.

In 1980, Moore enrolled in Cornell University's M.F.A. program, where she was taught by Alison Lurie. Upon graduation from Cornell, Moore was encouraged by a teacher to contact literary agent Melanie Jackson, who agreed to take her as a client. In 1983, Jackson sold Moore's collection Self-Help, almost entirely stories from her master's thesis, to Knopf.

== Works ==
=== Short stories ===
Moore's short story collections are Self-Help (1985), Like Life (1990), the New York Times bestseller Birds of America (1998), and Bark (2014). She has contributed to The Paris Review and Granta. Her first story to appear in The New Yorker, "You're Ugly, Too," was later included in The Best American Short Stories of the Century, edited by John Updike. Another story, "People Like That Are the Only People Here," also published in The New Yorker, was reprinted in the 1998 edition of the annual collection The Best American Short Stories; the tale of a young child falling sick, the piece was loosely patterned on events in Moore's own life. The story was also included in the 2005 anthology Children Playing Before a Statue of Hercules, edited by David Sedaris.

Moore's anthology Collected Stories was published by Faber in the United Kingdom in May 2008. It includes all the stories in each of her previously published collections and three previously uncollected stories first published in The New Yorker.

Moore's latest collection, Bark, was published in 2014. It became a finalist of The Story Prize and was short-listed by Frank O'Connor International Short Story Award.

=== Novels ===
Moore's novels are Anagrams (1986), Who Will Run the Frog Hospital? (1994), and A Gate at the Stairs (2009). Anagrams, with its experimental form, received a rather cold critical response. Who Will Run the Frog Hospital is the story of a woman vacationing with her husband who recalls an intense friendship from her adolescence. A Gate at the Stairs takes place just after the September 11 attack and is about a 20-year-old Midwestern woman's coming of age.

Of Moore's 2023 novel I Am Homeless if This Is Not My Home, The New Yorker's Parul Sehgal wrote: "One might say of Lorrie Moore what she said of Updike—that she is our greatest writer without a great novel—but how tinny ‘greatness’ can feel when caught in the inhabiting, staining, possessing power of a work of such determined strangeness and pain. An almost violent kind of achievement: a writer knifing forward, slicing open a new terrain—slicing open conventional notions and obligations of narrative itself."

=== Children's books ===
Moore has written a children's book entitled The Forgotten Helper: A Christmas Story, about an elf whom Santa Claus mistakenly leaves behind at the home of the worst child on his "good" list. The elf must help the child be good for the coming year so Santa will return next Christmas.

=== Essays ===
Moore writes occasionally about books, films, and television for The New York Review of Books. A collection of her essays, criticism and comment was published by Knopf as See What Can Be Done in April 2018.

== Academic career ==
Moore was the Delmore Schwartz Professor in the Humanities at the University of Wisconsin–Madison, where she taught creative writing for 30 years. She joined the faculty in 1984 and left to join the faculty at Vanderbilt University in the fall of 2013, where she is now the Gertrude Conaway Vanderbilt Professor of English.

Moore has also taught at Cornell University, as the Sidney Harman Writer-in-Residence at Baruch College, and at the MFA in Creative Writing program at the University of Michigan, as well as at Princeton and New York University.

== Bibliography ==
=== Short stories ===
- 1985 – Self-Help; ISBN 9780446671927
- 1990 – Like Life; ISBN 9780375719165
- 1998 – Birds of America; ISBN 9780312241223
- 2008 – The Collected Stories; ISBN 9780571239344
- 2014 – Bark; ISBN 9780307594136
- 2020 – Collected Stories; ISBN 9780375712388

=== Novels ===
- 1986 – Anagrams; ISBN 9780307277282
- 1994 – Who Will Run the Frog Hospital?; ISBN 9781400033829
- 2009 – A Gate at the Stairs; ISBN 9780375409288
- 2023 – I Am Homeless if This Is Not My Home; ISBN 9780593744154

=== Children's books ===
- 1987 – The Forgotten Helper; ISBN 9780440416807

=== Non-fiction ===
- 2018 – See What Can Be Done; ISBN 9781524732486

== Awards and recognition ==
Moore won the 1998 O. Henry Award for her short story "People Like That Are the Only People Here," published in The New Yorker on January 27, 1997.

In 1999, Moore was named as the winner of the Irish Times International Fiction Prize for Birds of America.

In 2004, she was selected as winner of the Rea Award for the Short Story, for outstanding achievement in that genre. She was elected to the American Academy of Arts and Letters in 2006, and is a fellow of the Wisconsin Academy of Sciences, Arts & Letters. In 2008, she delivered Oxford University's annual Esmond Harmsworth Lecture in American Arts and Letters at the university's Rothermere American Institute.

Her 2009 novel, A Gate at the Stairs, was a finalist for the 2010 PEN/Faulkner Award for Fiction and for the Orange Prize for Fiction.

Bark was shortlisted for the 2014 Frank O'Connor International Short Story Award and was a finalist for The Story Prize.

Her novel I Am Homeless if This Is Not My Home was the winner of the 2023 National Book Critics Circle Award in Fiction. She was a James Merrill Invited Fellow in 2016.
