= Self-Help (short story collection) =

First edition (publ. Knopf)

Self-Help (1985) is a collection of short stories by Lorrie Moore.

== Contents ==
=== "How to Be an Other Woman" ===
Charlene and Jack meet at a bus stop, and after a few dates, they sleep with each other. Afterward, Jak tells Charlene that even though he has a wife, he's still interested in forming a relationship with her. Charlene agrees to pursue a relationship with him, but as the affair goes on, she notices herself quickly beginning to change. Charlene begins to feel that she is losing her identity; she begins to feel intense anxiety and paranoia about confronting Jack's wife, and deep loneliness and longing when he isn't around. She even goes as far as to lie awake at night with her door unlocked, hoping that he will come over. As the affair continues, Charlene decides to confront Jack about how she lacks emotional support and comfort because he isn't with her enough. Jack confesses to Charlene that he has been separated from his wife; feeling betrayed, Charlene kicks him out of her apartment. Her love for him quickly dissolves, and even though her days become long and tedious, she doesn't let her love for him come back.

=== "What is Seized" ===
“What is Seized” is a short story in which the narrator, Lynnie, describes the relationship between her mother and father while she watches her mother's mental and physical health deteriorate. Her mother was married to a cold man and while it is not out rightly stated, it is implied that her father was cheating. Even though her mother has been through a lot, she is trying to show her daughter that she still had a good life and enjoyed all the beautiful parts of it.

=== "The Kid's Guide to Divorce" ===
A daughter and her divorced mother hang out for the evening at their home. After making popcorn, the daughter joins her mother who is listening to music on the television. When the program is over, the mother asks her daughter to suggest a new program for them to watch. The daughter suggests "The Late, Late Chiller," a horror movie with a mummy and a werewolf. Cuddling next to each other, the two converse casually until they are interrupted by a minor incident in which the daughter chokes on a piece of popcorn. After a while, the daughter expresses her disgust with the movie, the mother suggests switching to Channel 7, where a rock concert is showing. The daughter agrees and makes the switch. They both give their opinions on the various acts that come on stage until the daughter announces her intention to go to bed. Before she can leave, however, the mother asks how the past three days with her father went. The daughter responds, "they went all right," but specifically leaves out details of alcohol and the fact that her father is with a new woman.

=== "How" ===
This second person narrative is told from the point of view of a girl in a struggling relationship. After dating her boyfriend for a while, she begins to grow bored of him and contemplates the good and bad aspects of the relationship. Her unhappiness persists, which leads her to have a short affair. She also starts lashing out at her boyfriend because everything he does gets on her nerves. He wants to have kids and start a family, but she is not ready to take that step with him. After planning her get away she attempts to break up with him, but news of him being sick keeps her from leaving. Going to doctor appointments, and doing what she can to help him get well, she still wants to leave but it never feels like the right time. Another long term affair ensues; she sneaks around and lies to her boyfriend about what she is doing even though he knows the truth. Finally, she takes him to dinner and tells him she wants to break up. She moves out, and after having time to heal, feels nothing but indifference towards leaving him.

=== "How to Talk to Your Mother (Notes)" ===
A daughter recollects her lifetime with and without her mother in a timeline starting after her mother's death and working backward to her own birth. In each year of her lifetime, the narrator highlights parts of her life that are influential to her character. The story covers her mother's death, the sickness of her mother, her father's death, the narrator's few suitors, and her childhood. Readers follow the narrator on a personal level, allowing insight into who she is as a person and the events that made her that way, ultimately leading to the beginning of the woman's life.

=== "Amahl and the Night Visitors: A Guide to the Tenor of Love" ===
In “Amahal and the Night Visitors: A Guide to the Tenor of Love,” Lorrie Moore writes about a breakup between the main character, Trudy, and her boyfriend, Moss. She writes the story in second person, along with the majority of her other stories, so that the reader can connect with the characters on a personal level. The story is broken up into journal entries. Some days Trudy has long, elaborate entries, and other days she only writes a few words. Trudy constantly obsesses over something. She believes that Moss is cheating on her with a fellow cast member, then she believes that Moss is cheating on her with Bob, and she worries about her cat. In some parts of the story, the reader can see a connection between Moss and the cat. She and Moss disagree on whether the cat belongs inside or outside. Trudy doesn't want to let the cat go but Moss disagrees. Finally Trudy lets the cat out, but it never returns. Just like Moss, at the end of the story he leaves her. In both relationships, Trudy is overprotective, and that is what eventually ruins both.

=== "How to Become a Writer" ===
The second person narrative follows a determined girl named Francie and her constant struggle with wanting to have a career in writing. She fails often. However, she continues to follow her dream of becoming a writer despite the many difficulties that come her way. We follow the writer through several stages of her life where failure has impacted her becoming a writer, from unsuccessful short stories to her literary demise. The story ends with Francie finding tedious things to do to pass time because she has altogether failed and has severed nearly all personal connections. Still, she is convinced she took the right path and is glad she isn't like everyone else whose lives go "always in the same direction".

=== "To Fill" ===
Riva, a depressed retail manager, visits the hospital where her mother receives treatment for mental illness. During these visits, Riva convinces herself that her mother would be fine without the hospital, but Riva's view of reality is warped because she also wishes her life was better, like her mother's. Her mother expresses her wish for Riva to get back together with her boyfriend Phillip, but she forgets that Riva has been married to another man, Tom, for six years. Riva is stuck on losing Phillip, hinting that the title of the story, "To Fill," may be a letter “to Phillip,” as a play on words. Riva's life goes in a downward spiral, and when she catches Tom with his mistress, she stabs him in the stomach. The story ends with Riva in the same hospital as her mom, thinking about her life and the possibility of seeing her son again.
