= American immigrant novel =

Literary genre

An American immigrant novel is a genre of American novel which explores the process of assimilation and the relationship of American immigrants toward American identity and ideas. The novels often show and explore generational differences in immigrant families, especially the first and second generations. The extraordinary ethnic diversity of America allows for a type of immigrant novel which differs from those of other countries. America, often seen as a country of immigrants, opens up a unique canvas for expression and helps readers develop a better understanding of the American immigrant experience. The narrative styles are diverse and can include memoirs, third-person, first-person, and biographies.

Generational changes in attitude, identity, experience, and demographics from real statistics are challenged and explored by immigrant novels, such as the change in income level and attitudes toward assimilation.

== Themes ==
In these novels, the immigrant experience often begins with a feeling of wild, open-ended adventure, as the protagonists make the move to the US and leave their previous homes halfway around the world. Once they arrive in America, however, the immigrant family often finds themselves in an unfamiliar and seemingly unwelcoming and introverted culture. Tensions appear within and without the family and manifest themselves in problems at work, with health, or strained family relationships.

Parents tend to retain their culture from their home country while their children, the second generation, are fully assimilated Americans who understand American culture and become the guides for their parents. Then often in this pattern the third generation, the grandkids of the original immigrants return to a fascination with their heritage and their grandparent's culture. Recent research highlights the complexity of immigrant generations and their increases and declines in socioeconomic integration, and this genre of the novel explores this complex theme. Age at the time of arrival, family relationships, and economic status all interact to create a diverse genre of novel, dealing with types of questions such as when the immigrants behind to consider themselves American, and when parents and children will end up switching roles as the younger caretaker and the older, but the seemingly helpless beneficiary.

== Literary examples ==
- Bread Givers, Anzia Yezierska
- The Namesake, Jhumpa Lahiri
- Monkey Bridge, Lan Cao
- The House on Mango Street, Sandra Cisneros
- The Joy Luck Club, Amy Tan
- The Kite Runner, Khaled Hosseini
- Digging to America, Anne Tyler
- Samabhok by Shiva Prakash (शिव प्रकाश)
