= Troy Jollimore =

Canadian-American poet, philosopher, and literary critic

- Born: 1971 (age 54–55); Liverpool, Nova Scotia
- Education: Ph.D. in Philosophy from Princeton University
- Occupations: Poet and Professor of Philosophy at California State University, Chico

Troy Jollimore (born 1971) is a Canadian-American poet, philosopher, literary critic, and academic known for poetic writings.

== Early life and education ==
Troy Jollimore was born in 1971 in Liverpool, Nova Scotia, and attended the University of King's College in Halifax, Nova Scotia. He earned his Ph.D. in philosophy from Princeton University in 1999, under the direction of Harry Frankfurt and Gilbert Harman. He has lived in the U.S. since 1993.

Jollimore is a professor of philosophy at California State University, Chico. He has been an external faculty fellow at the Stanford Humanities Center (2006–2007), the Stanley P. Young fellow in poetry at the Bread Loaf Writers' Conference (2012), and a Guggenheim fellow (2013).

== Career ==
Jollimore's philosophical writings frequently concern ethical issues connected to personal relationships. His first book, Friendship and Agent-Relative Morality, was published in 2001; his second, Love's Vision, appeared in 2011, and his third, On Loyalty, in 2012. Many of his papers explore issues in the philosophy of friendship and romantic love. He has also published on topics including the ethics of terrorism, the depiction of evil in literature, the nature of happiness, the existence of so-called "admirable immorality," and aesthetic issues in philosophy of poetry and philosophy of dance.

In an interview with the Los Angeles Review of Books, Jollimore says of Tom Thomson in Purgatory, "I don't plan what I'm going to write; I discover it by writing it."

=== Reception ===
His first collection of poetry, Tom Thomson in Purgatory, won the National Book Critics Circle award for poetry in 2006. Reviewer John Freeman writes of this collection, "Jollimore injects a much-needed jolt of helium into contemporary poetry. . . His poems are wry, but never smug; they're full of twists and tweaks of double entendres, but they are far from cross." Freeman continues,

". . . it's refreshing to see a poet prove you can write mysteriously and coherently at the same time, all while maintaining the belay rope of tradition. Listen closely to Troy Jollimore, and you will hear Whitman whispering his "barbaric yawp" through a muffled giggle. Tune in to these lines and you'll find John Berryman. But most important, go out and find this book and take it home, and you will find a new and exciting voice in American poetry, emerging from the purgatory so many poets know, but this one never deserved: obscurity."

Tom Thomson in Purgatory was nominated for the 2007 Poets' Prize.

A Publishers Weekly review of Jollimore's second poetry collection, At Lake Scugog, states, "Altogether different and hard to forget are the poems on which Jollimore concludes: stern, vulnerable, lyrical reactions to environmental peril."

His third collection, Syllabus of Errors, was selected by The New York Times as one of the "Best Poetry Books of 2015".

The poet Forrest Gander writes of Jollimore's 2021 Earthly Delights, "This engaging and unusual book mixes humor, philosophy, and political ire, drawing repeatedly on film references to examine palimpsestic constructions of the self—the 'slipping in and out of roles,' the possibility of two people seeing through a single pair of eyes, the next life that is likewise an earlier life. Jollimore's riveting language is both familiar and uncanny, somehow as lean and precise as it is lexically rich."

Author Paisley Rekdal states, "Earthly Delights is full of parentheticals, ellipses, allusions, and contradictions. Jollimore's poems delight in syntax that tries, through capacious twists and turns, to locate what is the real. They raise philosophical questions about nostalgia and representation, melancholy and pleasure that Jollimore never attempts to resolve, preferring instead to place the reader where 'everything is / in flux and ungraspable.' A vibrant, restless, and deeply intelligent collection."

Jollimore's poems have appeared in publications including The New Yorker, The Believer, McSweeney's, and Poetry.

He is also a frequent book reviewer, writing for The Washington Post, The Chicago Tribune, the San Francisco Chronicle, and the New York Times Book Review, among others.

== Philosophies ==
In Love's Vision and in several papers published since Jollimore defends the view that we have reasons for loving the people we love, while allowing that love has significant non-rational elements and that our reasons do not completely determine whom we love. He defends the "Vision View" of love, which claims that love has many of the features of perception, and that an understanding of these features can solve common philosophical puzzles that arise in connection with love.

Papers published since Love's Vision explore themes of autonomy, identity, and anxiety in the contexts of romantic love and friendship.

Jollimore frequently discusses contemporary cinema in his work, and has published papers on philosophical issues found in such films as Eternal Sunshine of the Spotless Mind, The Big Lebowski, Her, Rear Window, and Vertigo.

== Books ==
=== Poetry collections ===
- Tom Thomson in Purgatory. MARGIE / Intuit House. 2006. ISBN 9780971904057.
- The Solipsist. Bear Star Press. 2008. ISBN 978-0-9793745-2-4
- At Lake Scugog. Princeton University Press. 2011. ISBN 978-0-691-14942-4
- Syllabus of Errors. Princeton University Press. 2015. ISBN 978-0-691-16768-8
- Earthly Delights. Princeton University Press. 2021. ISBN 978-0-691-21883-0

=== Philosophy ===
- Friendship and Agent-Relative Morality. Garland Publishing. 2001. ISBN 978-0-8153-3966-3
- Love's Vision. Princeton University Press. 2011. ISBN 978-0-691-14872-4
- On Loyalty. Routledge. 2012. ISBN 978-0-415-78227-2
