= Bap-Tizum =

Live album by Art Ensemble of Chicago
- Released: 1973
- Recorded: September 9, 1972
- Venue: Ann Arbor Blues and Jazz Festival, Otis Spann Memorial Field, Ann Arbor, MI
- Genre: Jazz
- Length: 45:18
- Label: Atlantic; SD 1639
- Producer: Tunç Erim, Jimmy Douglass

Art Ensemble of Chicago chronology
Live at Mandell Hall (1972)	Bap-Tizum (1973)	Fanfare for the Warriors (1973)

Bap-Tizum is a 1972 live album by the Art Ensemble of Chicago recorded at the Ann Arbor Blues and Jazz Festival held at the Otis Spann Memorial Field and first released on the Atlantic label in 1973. It features performances by Lester Bowie, Joseph Jarman, Roscoe Mitchell, Malachi Favors Maghostut and Don Moye.

== Reception ==
Rolling Stone's Bob Palmer wrote "Bap-Tizum features dozens of instruments (all the saxophones from soprano to bass, tempered and non-tempered percussion, etc.) and sequences of colours and moods which range from energy-raising to reflection to explosive anger to sheer soul strutting... The performance gassed ten thousand people, most of whom had never heard of the group, and Atlantic is to be commended for releasing it in all its rough hard-edged grandeur."

The Allmusic review by Richard S. Ginell awarded the album 5 stars noting that "the Art Ensemble holds back nothing in a chaotic, meandering, exasperating, outrageous -- and, thus, always fascinating -- performance".

Critic Michael G. Nastos calls the album "essential". Author Rafi Zabor describes the album as a "riotous" real-life analogue to his depiction of a fictional, tumultuous Art Ensemble performance in The Bear Comes Home.

Professional ratings
Review scores
Source	Rating
Allmusic	5/5 stars
Christgau's Record Guide	C−
Penguin Guide to Jazz (8th ed.)	3/3 stars 1/1 star

== Track listing ==
1. "Nfamoudou-Boudougou" (Moye) - 4:16
2. "Immm" (Favors) - 5:31
3. "Unanka" (Mitchell) - 10:44
4. "Oouffnoon" (Mitchell) - 3:25
5. "Ohnedaruth" (Art Ensemble of Chicago) - 15:00
6. "Odwalla" (Mitchell) - 5:42
- Recorded September 9, 1972 at the Ann Arbor Blues and Jazz Festival, Michigan

== Personnel ==
- Lester Bowie: trumpet, percussion instruments
- Malachi Favors Maghostut: bass, percussion instruments, vocals
- Joseph Jarman: saxophones, clarinets, percussion instruments
- Roscoe Mitchell: saxophones, clarinets, flute, percussion instruments
- Don Moye: drums, percussion
