= Robert Getchell =

Hollywood screenwriter

- Born: December 6, 1936; Kansas City, Missouri, U.S.
- Died: October 21, 2017 (aged 80); Monterey, California, U.S.
- Occupation: Screenwriter

Robert Getchell (December 6, 1936 – October 21, 2017) was an American screenwriter.

== Early life and education ==
Getchell graduated from the University of Missouri in 1965 and taught literature at the University of Missouri.

== Career ==
Getchell wrote the 1974 film Alice Doesn't Live Here Anymore and created the sitcom based on that film, Alice. He was nominated for an Academy Award for his screenplays for both Alice Doesn't Live Here Anymore and the subsequent Bound for Glory (1976). Getchell's recurrent theme in most of his films is the relationship between a parent or parent substitute and a child or young person in trying or dangerous situations.

Getchell was also the screenwriter for the 1981 docudrama film Mommie Dearest, based on Christina Crawford's nightmarish childhood with her violent, manipulative, alcoholic adoptive mother, the actress Joan Crawford. The film was intended to be a serious drama about child abuse, but Getchell's script was chaotic, jumbled, and lacked psychological insight. It won the Golden Raspberry award that year for worst screenplay, one of the factors that led Mommie Dearest to be remembered as a cult film.

Getchell adapted Geoffrey Wolff's The Duke of Deception for a screenplay and, later, Tobias Wolff's book This Boy's Life: A Memoir for the film, This Boy's Life.

== Personal life ==
He died on October 21, 2017, aged 80.

== Filmography ==
- Alice Doesn't Live Here Anymore (1974)
- Bound for Glory (1976)
- Alice (1976–1985)
- Mommie Dearest (1981)
- Sweet Dreams (1985)
- Stella (1990)
- Point of No Return (1993)
- This Boy's Life (1993)
- The Client (1994)

== Awards ==
- 1975: nominated for an Academy Award and Writers Guild of America Award for Alice Doesn't Live Here Anymore.
- 1976: won a BAFTA Award for Alice Doesn't Live Here Anymore.
- 1977: nominated for an Academy Award and WGA Award for Bound for Glory.
- 1982: won a Golden Raspberry Award for Worst Screenplay for Mommie Dearest.
