= Back in the World (short stories) =

1985 short story collection by Tobias Wolff

- Publisher: Houghton Mifflin
- Publication date: 1985
- Media type: print (hardback)
- Pages: 221
- ISBN: 978-0395354162

Back in the World is a collection of short fiction by Tobias Wolff first published in 1985 by Houghton Mifflin (New York) and by Jonathan Cape (London).

"The Rich Brother" was selected for The Best American Short Stories and "Leviathan" was included in Pushcart Prize XI, both in 1986.

== Plot ==
Periodical and date of original publication are indicated for selected stories.

- Coming Attractions
- "The Missing Person" in The Atlantic, February 1983
- "Say Yes" in The Missouri Review (as "Washing Up")
- "The Poor Are Always With Us" in The Atlantic, September 1984
- "Sister" Ploughshares, Winter 1983/1984
- "Soldier's Joy" in Esquire, October 1, 1985
- "Desert Breakdown, 1968 (Desert Breakdown)" in Vanity Fair, June 1983
- Our Story Begins
- Leviathan in Triquarterly
- The Rich Brother in Vanity Fair, June 1985

== Reception ==
"When I sit down to write, I discover things that I have, for one reason or another, not admitted, not seen, not reflected on sufficiently. And those are the things that I live for in other people's fiction as well as my own."—Tobias Wolff, from a 1993 interview with Jay Woodruff.

Noting Wolff's willingness to take "technical risks," reviewer Michiko Kakutani reserves special praise the sensitive presentation of the characters in the collection: "What really makes the finest of these stories so compelling is the author's sympathy for his characters, his clear-eyed but generous sense of their weaknesses, their frustrations and disappointments."

Fiction writer Russel Banks compared the stories unfavorably to Wolff's previous volume In the Garden of the North American Martyrs (1981). Banks takes offense at "the suetlike prose studded with an occasional image (like gulls 'diving for scraps'), inserted for literary flavor and serving only to make the obvious more obvious." Only two stories—"Leviathan" and "The Rich Brother"—rate Russel's approval and are "as fine as anything Mr. Wolff has written."

A member of the Washington Post Writers Group, Jonathan Penner, extolled the virtues of Wolff's Back in the World. He notes that the stories in the collection are written exclusively in the third-person and, as such, eliminate "viewpoint characters," adding that "in fiction, it tends to be awkward, artificial, inefficient, and extraordinarily difficult."

Nonetheless, this narrative approach has its virtues: "Wolff turns the handicap into an added grace, making his method appear easy or even inevitable." Penner declares Back in the World "a striking and exciting collection by a writer unusually fine."

== Sources ==
- Banks, Russell. 1985. "Aging Clay and the Prodigal Son." New York Times, October 20, 1985."Aging Clay and the Prodigal Son". The New York Times.
- Hannah, James. 1981. Tobias Wolff: A Study of the Short Fiction. Twayne Publishers, New York. Simon & Schuster Macmillan. ISBN 0-8057-0864-2
- Kakutani, Michiko. 1985. BOOKS OF THE TIMES. New York Times, October 2, 1985."Books of the Times". The New York Times.
- Penner, Jonathan. 1985. "Tobias Wolff and the Taste for Experience." Review of Back in the World. Washington Post Writers Group, The Washington Post, November 3. 1985 in Tobias Wolff: A Study of the Short Fiction. Twayne Publishers, New York. Simon & Schuster Macmillan. Gordon Weaver, editor. pp. 168–170. ISBN 0-8057-0864-2
- Woodruff, Jay. 1993. "Interview with Tobias Wolff" in A Piece of Work: Five Writers Discuss Their Revisions. Jay Woodruff, editor. University of Iowa Press. pp. 20–44 ISBN 978-0-87745-409-0
