= The Barracks Thief =

1984 novella by Tobias Wolff

- First edition (publ. Ecco Press)
- Author: Tobias Wolff
- Genre: War stories
- Published: 1984
- Media type: Print
- Pages: 101 pages
- ISBN: 0880010355
- OCLC: 9853510

The Barracks Thief is a novella by American writer Tobias Wolff, first published in 1984 by Ecco Press. The story follows three paratroopers in training during the time of the Vietnam War, alternating between different tenses and points of view. Because most of the men in the company fought together in Vietnam, the three newcomers are treated as outsiders and ignored. When money and personal property are discovered missing from the barracks, suspicion falls on the three newcomers. The work explores themes of morality, masculinity, and camaraderie. It received the PEN/Faulkner Award for Fiction in 1985.

== Background ==
The narrative structure of the book contains several shifts of tone and point of view as the story unfolds. During an interview in 1989, Wolff described these shifts as a device to explore characters' state of mind. Regarding the present tense view of the thief, he stated: "I wanted to give the sense of a person who has no attachment to the past, who has been tremendously hurt by the past but is cut off from his consciousness of it. He lives in the present, almost like an animal."

Readers of Wolff's memoir In Pharaoh's Army: Memories of the Lost War (1994) will note that the author trained as a paratrooper and served in Vietnam.

== Plot ==
An omniscient narrator introduces Guy Bishop as a wandering husband and the father of two young boys, Philip and Keith. The boys struggle to adjust after their father leaves the family. Philip, who resents his father, joins the Eighty-second Airborne Division at Fort Bragg after graduating high school, while the younger Keith turns to drugs and drops out. The point of view switches to Philip's first person account of training as a paratrooper. The leadership assigns him and two other new recruits, Lewis and Hubbard, to guard an ammunition dump in the woods. Two civilians urge them to abandon their post due to the danger of an encroaching forest fire, but they refuse, driving off the civilians at gunpoint.

The story switches to third-person present. An alienated Lewis roves around the town outside the base, where he attempts to engage a prostitute who rebuffs his advances. Back on base, he begins a spree of petty theft, stealing several wallets. His fellow soldiers react with dismay and anger at the unknown thief. Lewis steals Hubbard’s wallet and punches him in the face, though Hubbard does not see his assailant. After taking the cash, Lewis throws discards the wallet but keeps the personnel letter in it. He is outed as the thief when an officer makes the men strip and empty their pockets. From Philip's perspective, the men cannot understand why Lewis' motivation, and a group plans to beat him. Philip encourages Hubbard to join them, but he refuses. During the assault on Lewis, Philip just watches. Years later, Philip is leading a living a complacent life and reflects on Lewis' dishonorable discharge and Hubbard's desertion. He also thinks about the day guarding the ammunition dump with those two men and the different courses their lives took.

== Reception and awards ==
The Barracks Thief won the PEN/Faulkner Award for Fiction in 1985. In a review for The New York Times, Walter Kendrick praised Wolfe for his ability to portray characters in turmoil with "delicacy and convincingness", while deftly switching between points of view. Kendrick also described the novella as leaving the reader with the question of "whether it is better to die spectacularly or to dribble on for decades in safe conventionality".

In 2024, Deadline reported that a film adaption of The Barracks Thief was underway from screenwriter Jonathan Keasey.
