= Hunters in the Snow (short story) =

- Short story by Tobias Wolff
- Country: United States
- Language: English

Publication
- Published in: Triquarterly, Issue #48 "Western Stories" publication_type = Literary journal
- Media type: Print (magazine)
- Publication date: Spring 1980

"Hunters in the Snow" is a work of short fiction by Tobias Wolff originally appearing in Triquarterly, Spring 1980 and first collected in In the Garden of the North American Martyrs (1981) by The Ecco Press.

== Plot ==
The story deals with three characters hunting together in the woods; Kenny, who is hard and brutal; Tub, who is fat, a target of ridicule, and lags behind the rest of the party; and Frank, who is the most "frank" of the group. Each character has a distinct personality which changes as the story progresses. The story reaches its climax when Tub shoots Kenny in what appears to be an accident. Tub and Frank seem to be taking Kenny to a hospital, but wind up stopping in a diner and a roadhouse in a strange chain of events. The story ends with them driving in a direction opposite to that of the hospital.

== Background ==
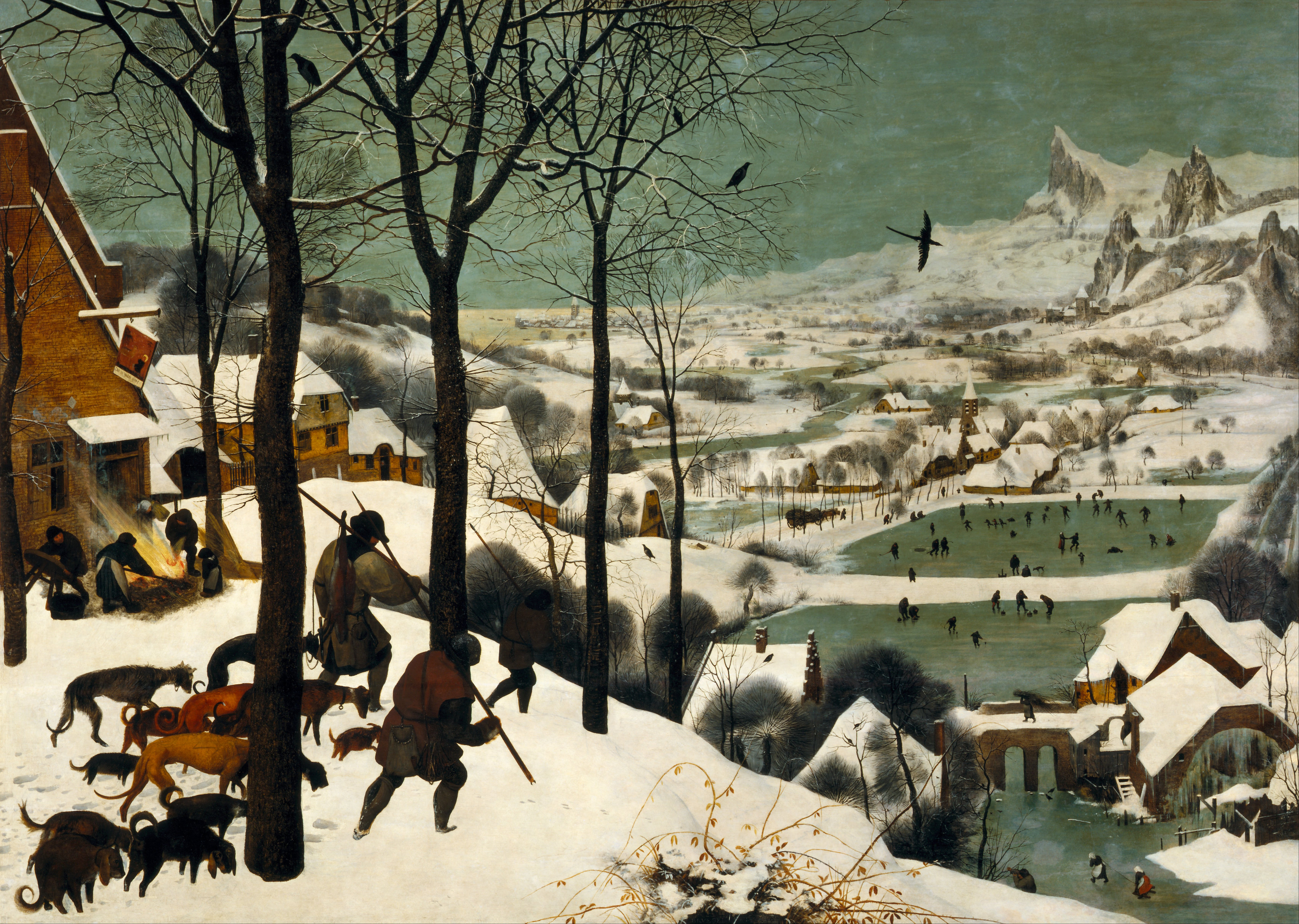
Pieter Bruegel the Elder's The Hunters in the Snow

This story's title refers to the painting The Hunters in the Snow (1565)) by Pieter Bruegel the Elder. In a 1993 interview with biographer Jay Woodruff, Wolff agreed that the story was "well-made."

It's got a good strong narrative line, and the dialogue is funny in a way that the characters who speak it aren't aware of. I like that story. That's one of my favorite stories still.

== Realism and surrealism ==
The sharp realism that characterizes "Hunters in the Snow" in the early narrative scenes serves to describe the setting: a harsh, frozen landscape in which the brutal treatment of Tub is documented. As the story progresses, the first detour from reality occurs when Kenny shoots the old farm dog dead—what seems a shockingly irrational act—followed by Tub's panicked discharge of his rifle at Kenny in the style of a wild west showdown. The shooting initiates a shift in the trio's alliances. Gut-shot, Kenny is in desperate need of emergency medical care. That Tub and Frank fail to seek help is as bizarre as it is callous. A fatal irony surreally unfolds in a quasi-slapstick misadventure to seek medical care which is likely to end with a frozen corpse in the bed of the truck, while Tub and Frank remain absorbed in male bonding.

== Theme ==
Biographer James Hannah locates a key thematic element in the final sentence of the story, reflecting the new Tub-Frank alliance in the new triangular configuration: "They had taken a different turn a long way back." The grievously wounded Kenny, now odd man out, will never be delivered to the hospital in time to save his life. Tub has displaced Kenny, "rising to imminence at the literal expense of the other."

=== Masculine camaraderie ===
Each of the major characters (Frank, Tub, and Kenny) displays a significant lack of concern for others at some point in the story. At the beginning of the story, we read about Kenny's reckless driving and witness a small exchange of mockery among the characters. The characters travel through the woods, hunting, and after tracking a deer, arrive at a house. Upon requesting permission to hunt on the property of the house, unknown to Frank and Tub, Kenny is personally asked to shoot the landowner's dog. After he completes the task, he jokingly threatens to shoot Tub and in return is actually shot by Tub who truly believed he was in danger. Frank and Tub decide to take Kenny to the hospital. On the way to the hospital, we learn that Frank is planning on leaving his wife and children for 'true love'. After confessing this to Tub, Tub reveals his secret as well—gluttony. They stopped at a restaurant and Frank orders several orders of pancakes for Tub, allowing him to indulge in his gluttony. They get back into the truck and start driving away from the hospital.

== Sources ==
- Hannah, James. 1981. Tobias Wolff: A Study of the Short Fiction. Twayne Publishers, New York. Simon & Schuster Macmillan. Gordon Weaver, editor. ISBN 0-8057-0864-2
- Tayler, Christopher. 2008. "Soldiering on." The Guardian, August 1, 2008. https://www.theguardian.com/books/2008/aug/02/fiction Accessed 23 October, 2026.
- Woodruff, Jay. 1993. "Interview with Tobias Wolff" in A Piece of Work: Five Writers Discuss Their Revisions. Jay Woodruff, editor. pp. 22-40. University of Iowa Press. ISBN 978-0-87745-409-0
