= Bullet in the Brain (short story) =

1995 short story by Tobias Wolff

- Short story by Tobias Wolff
- Country: United States
- Language: English

Publication
- Published in: The New Yorker
- Publication type: Literary journal
- Media type: Print (magazine)
- Publication date: September 25, 1995

"Bullet in the Brain" is a work of short fiction by Tobias Wolff originally published in The New Yorker, September 25, 1995 and first collected in The Night in Question: Stories (1996). The story is included in the 2008 volume Our Story Begins: New and Selected Stories.

The story is among the most anthologized of Wolff's fiction. "Bullet in the Brain" was featured in A Century in Fiction in, 1925–2025, Deborah Treisman editor.

== Critical assessment ==
Kirkus Reviews places "Bullet in the Brain" among the weakest in the 1996 collection The Night in Question: Stories, tales that are "too clearly the products of controlling ideas." Kirkus suggests that readers "forget these stories" and concentrate on the other pieces in the volume.

Charles Taylor, writing in Salon, questions Wolff's handling of his material; in "Bullet in the Brain" he can call his own strengths into question—the feel for naturalistic detail that never sinks to the mandarin drudgery of Raymond Carver; the precise, unshowy verisimilitude of period and character."

World Socialist Web Site literary critic Sandy English observes that "Bullet in the Brain" conforms to contemporary fiction narratives — "not necessarily a good sign" — but offers this distinction: "Wolff's strength lies in his ability to locate optimism and kindness in a generally over-stressed and false America, without dismissing or hiding people's shortcomings."

== Sources ==
- English, Sandy. 2010. "A sense of unease: Tobias Wolff's recent fiction collected in Our Story Begins." World Socialist Web Site, August 10, 2010.https://www.wsws.org/en/articles/2010/08/wolf-a10.html Accessed 23 October 2026.
- Hannah, James. 1981. Tobias Wolff: A Study of the Short Fiction. Twayne Publishers, New York. Simon & Schuster Macmillan. ISBN 0-8057-0864-2
- Taylor, Charles. 1996. Charles Taylor reviews Tobias Wolff's "The Night In Question." Salon, October 14, 1996. https://www.salon.com/1996/10/14/sneakpeeks_159/ Accessed October 22, 2026.
- Wolff, Tobias. 1997. The Night in Question. Alfred A. Knopf. ISBN 978-0679781554
- Wolff, Tobias. 1995. "Bullet in the Brain." The New Yorker, September 25, 1995 https://www.newyorker.com/magazine/1995/09/25/bullet-in-the-brain Access 4 November 2026.
- Wolff, Tobias. 2025. A Century of Fiction in The New Yorker: 1925-2025. Edited by Deborah Treisman. Alfred A Knopf, New York. pp. 404–409. ISBN 978-0-593-80191-8
