= Old School (novel) =

2003 novel by Tobias Wolff

- Cover of Old School
- Author: Tobias Wolff
- Language: English
- Genre: Semi-autobiography Coming-of-age
- Publisher: Vintage Books
- Publication date: November 4, 2003
- Publication place: United States
- Pages: 195

Old School is an American semi-autobiographical coming-of-age novel by Tobias Wolff that was first partially published in The New Yorker as a short story ahead of novelization in 2003. It acts a memoir for a fictional unnamed writer, who recalls his senior year at a New England preparatory school in 1960–1961. The novel explores intertwining themes of identity, class, belonging and literature. It was a finalist for the 2004 PEN/Faulkner Award for Fiction.

== Plot ==
The book is narrated by a school senior ("sixth former" in prep-school vernacular) at an unnamed elite boarding school in the northeastern United States in 1960–61. The unnamed protagonist is a scholarship student who comes from a middle-class family.

He aspires to be a writer, and the school he attends is an embodiment of a certain kind of academic fantasy, where non-English masters (teachers are "masters" here) "floated at the fringe of [the English masters'] circle, as if warming themselves at a fire," and literature is still believed to hold the key to the soul. Robert Frost, Ayn Rand, and Ernest Hemingway, with each of whom the narrator crosses paths, appear in the story, dispensing wisdom, pseudo-wisdom, vitriol. These literary appearances amount to creative satires of these authors, especially Ayn Rand. The novel revolves around themes of adolescence, class, and the role of literature.

The Penguin Random House publisher's blurb describes the book thus:

The protagonist of Tobias Wolff's shrewdly—and at times devastatingly—observed first novel is a boy at an elite prep school in 1960. He is an outsider who has learned to mimic the negligent manner of his more privileged classmates. Like many of them, he wants more than anything on earth to become a writer. But to do that he must first learn to tell the truth about himself. The agency of revelation is the school literary contest, whose winner will be awarded an audience with the most legendary writer of his time. As the fever of competition infects the boy and his classmates, fraying alliances, exposing weaknesses, Old School explores the ensuing deceptions and betrayals with an unblinking eye and a bottomless store of empathy. The result is further evidence that Wolff is an authentic American master.

In his review for the New York Times, critic A.O. Scott writes that Old School is "about nothing if not the making of a writer — though it is also, just as plainly, about a writer's failure."

== Reception ==
Carmela Ciucaru of the Los Angeles Times wrote "In Old School, Wolff again proves himself a writer of the highest order: part storyteller, part philosopher, someone deeply engaged in asking hard questions that take a lifetime to resolve". In The Guardian, Blake Morrison called Old School a "concise, beautifully written novel" and praised Wolff for taking the "courage, in 2004, to write with nuance and affection about an all-male boarding school".

Michael Upchurch of the Seattle Times suggested that despite being written as a novel, "in period, place and emotional feel, it's clearly the link between This Boy's Life and Wolff's Vietnam War memoir, In Pharaoh's Army." He calls it "a slippery mix of truth and fiction" believing the material to be largely autobiographical. He notes that the epigraph contains lines from the poem "Elegy for my Father" by Mark Strand hinting at why Wolff chose to write a novel.

=== Accolades ===
Old School was a finalist for the 2004 PEN/Faulkner Award for Fiction. The novel was chosen as a National Endowment for the Arts "Big Read" book for communities to read together. The Libraries of Greater Kansas City chose Old School as their Big Read in 2009.
