= In the Garden of the North American Martyrs (short story) =

1985 short story by Tobias Wolff

- Short story by Tobias Wolff
- Country: United States
- Language: English

Publication
- Published in: Antaeus
- Publication type: Literary journal
- Media type: Print (magazine)
- Publication date: Spring 1980

"The Garden of the North American Martyrs" is a work of short fiction by Tobias Wolff originally appearing in Antaeus, Spring 1980 and first collected in a volume of the same name (1981).

The work was selected as a prize story in the 1981 O. Henry Awards.

== Background ==
The volume's title story was taken with permission from a line of verse by New England poet Roger Weingarten in his book of poems entitled Ethan Benjamin Bolt (1975). Wolff reports that there is a Roman Catholic parish in Marshfield, Vermont called The Church of the North American Martyrs. Hannah, 1996 p. 3, p. 119.

On the genesis of the story Wolff remarked:

I was reading Parkman's wonderful book, The Jesuits in North America (1867) and I was riveted by his description of the martyrdom of Brébeuf and Lalement. I dreamt about it for a couple of nights. It exerted itself on the story I was writing in a strange way, because it helped me to see that much of what the story was about had to do with power. It illuminated that for me.

== Plot ==
Mary, a history professor serving at a private college for 15 years, has crafted her academic career so as never to offend the department heads. As such, she is thoroughly conventional in her professorial duties. Mary further avoids conflict by cultivating an eccentric persona. Without warning, the faculty and students discover that the college is shutting down immediately due to gross financial mismanagement. Mary accepts a position at a small alternative education college in coastal Oregon. After three years, she finds herself socially isolated. Her health has declined in the wet, humid climate. Her hearing aid tends to short out, causing her embarrassment.acts Mary: a member of the faculty is retiring; would Mary be interested in applying for the position? Louise chairs the search committee. Mary has no doubt she is qualified for the position, and all expenses are paid for her airfare and accommodations. Upon arrival, she is picked up by Louise. Mary discovers that the woman is entirely absorbed in her own personal life and career, for which she tries to enlist Mary's sympathy.

Rather than a pro forma interview, the university requires that she present a lecture to students and faculty, a fact which Louise failed to inform her. Mary is momentarily paralyzed: she has always lectured from meticulously prepared material. Rather than "wing it," Louise offers to provide her with her own unpublished article on the Marshall Plan. Mary regards this as tantamount to plagiarism, but out of desperation consents.

The next morning Mary is provided with a student guide to tour the university. The young man mentions in passing that the institution, formerly all male, is now co-ed: "In fact, there's a statute that says they have to interview at least one woman for each opening" in the faculty.

Mary arrives at the committee room. The department chair Mr. Howells, Louise, and several male professors arrive twenty minutes late. Mr. Howells limits his remarks largely to the topic of inclement weather in Oregon; no inquiries are made by the committee as to Mary's qualifications. She is met with silence when she urges them to select her for the job and the interview is quickly terminated. Mary now understands she has been summoned merely to fill a quota and was never considered a genuine candidate for the job. When Mary confronts Louise as to why she, rather than another woman, was invited to the interview, Louise pleads that she had hoped for moral support from Mary in her marriage crisis. When Mary balks at giving the lecture, knowing it to be pointless, Louise insists, reminding her of "all the money we paid to get you out here."

Mary finds that the lecture hall is packed with students and faculty. She proceeds to extemporize, making no reference to the Marshall Plan. Rather, she presents a historical sketch of the brutal warfare methods practiced by the Five Nations of the Iroquois upon their enemies during the 17th century. An alarmed murmur is heard in the lecture hall. Mary elaborates, providing a detailed description of the documented torture inflicted on two Jesuit priests: lips severed, a red-hot iron bars inserted in a throat, the flaying of skin and the flesh consumed raw by the torturers, and a heart torn from a Jesuit's chest while the victim was still alive. At this, the department chair jumps to his feet and attempts to silence her. Mary continues with her jeremiad: "Mend your lives. You have deceived yourself in the pride of your hearts and the strength of your arms…be kind, do justice, walk humbly." Undaunted by the uproar she has provoked, Mary turns off her hearing aid so that she "would not be distracted again."

== Critical appraisal ==
"Like Chekov and the modernists who followed—Joyce, Anderson, Hemingway, Carver—Wolf eschews plot-driven stories complete with traditional beginnings, middles, and ends. Instead he offers little if any introductory explication and often truncates his stories before they achieve traditional closure. Such works often depend on the reader to supply information while focusing on character rather than plot or event."—Biographer James Hannah

Literary critic Sandy English, writing for World Socialist Web Site, ranks the story among the best of Wolff's early work. "It is an affecting story on first reading, but one gains even more by following it through again closely."

== Theme ==
According to critic Brina Caplan, the protagonist's defiant yet measured outburst—"the first authentic act of her academic career"—are equally "visionary, lyric…and absurd."

As one of Wolff's stories set in academia, biographer James Hannah considers the piece "a much stronger indictment of the cruelties inherent in the world. By enlarging on this theme, Wolff criticizes all who abandon love and charity for power and pride." Hannah places Wolff among the "moralist" fiction writers, emulating the works of Graham Greene, Albert Camus, Andre Dubus, and Flannery O'Connor.

== Sources ==
- Caplan, Brina 1982. "Particular Truth (excerpts)." The Nation, February 6, 1982.
- English, Sandy. 2010. "A sense of unease: Tobias Wolff's recent fiction collected in Our Story Begins." World Socialist Web Site, August 10, 2010.https://www.wsws.org/en/articles/2010/08/wolf-a10.html Accessed 23 October 2026.
- Hannah, James. 1981. Tobias Wolff: A Study of the Short Fiction. Twayne Publishers, New York. Simon & Schuster Macmillan. ISBN 0-8057-0864-2
- Parkman, Francis. 1867. The Jesuits in North America in the Seventeenth Century. Chapter XXVII. THE MARTYRS.https://www.gutenberg.org/files/6933/6933-h/6933-h.htm#Chapter_281649. Access 5 November 2026.
- Tayler, Christopher. 2008. "Soldiering on." The Guardian, August 1, 2008. https://www.theguardian.com/books/2008/aug/02/fiction Accessed 23 October 2026.
- Woodruff, Jay. 1993. "Interview with Tobias Wolff" in A Piece of Work: Five Writers Discuss Their Revisions. Jay Woodruff, editor. University of Iowa Press. pp. 20–44ISBN 978-0-87745-409-0
