= The Night in Question (short story) =

1996 short story by Tobias Wolff

- Short story by Tobias Wolff
- Country: United States
- Language: English

Publication
- Published in: The New Yorker
- Publication type: Literary journal
- Media type: Print (magazine)
- Publication date: April 15, 1996

"The Night in Question" is a work of short fiction by Tobias Wolff originally appearing in The New Yorker, April 15, 1996 and first collected in The Night in Question: Stories (1996) by Alfred A. Knopf.

== Plot ==
The story is presented as a third-person limited-omniscient narrative. Frances is the focal character.

Frances drops by her younger brother's apartment. Frank, her junior by eight years, has asked her to visit to provide moral support: he has recently broken up with a girlfriend.

The siblings grew up together in a household with a violently abusive father and a passive, helpless mother. Frances assumed the role of protector for her little brother against their father's abuse, for which she was brutally punished. Frances' character was formed in this crucible of violence, characterizing her lifelong relationship with Frank: "Frances didn't mind a fight, and she especially didn't mind fighting for her brother. For her brother she'd fought neighborhood punks, snotty teachers and unappreciative coaches, loan sharks, landlords, bouncers."

Frank, now an evangelical Christian, relates a sermon he has heard at church. Frances, a non-believer, is wary, but consents to listen. The story concerns a railroad switchman whose duty it was to raise and lower a train trestle spanning a river. Coordinating the riverboat traffic and the train crossings was crucial: failure to deploy the bridge in time would lead to mass railway casualties.

An express train approached the crossing. Delays in maritime passage required an immediate deployment of the bridge. The switchman suddenly discovered that his nine-year-old son had wandered into the engine room below that housed the massive drawbridge apparatus. Activating the machinery would crush the boy to death. The father is faced with a horrifying dilemma. Frank reminds his sister that God sacrificed his only son Jesus to save humanity.

Frances is outraged with her brother's religious rationalization that seems to favor the sacrifice of a beloved child. She confronts her brother with an analogy: "I'm down in the mill, Frank. I'm stuck in the gears and here comes the train with Mother Teresa and five hundred assholes on board, whoo whoo, whoo whoo. Who, Frank, who? Who's it going to be?" Frank is bewildered and anguished by his sister's rhetorical question.

Frances realizes that the struggle to save Frank from religious zealotry is simply another episode in her lifelong effort to protect her little brother. This is the source of her empowerment, one that provides her with both "ferocity and unaccountable joy."

== Theme ==
Frances senses that her brother's rendition of the sermon may produce in her an emotional crisis. Critic Sandy English notes that, as anticipated, "this simple story unleashes a flood of emotions" in the sister, but English places her reaction in a larger social context:

She had saved her brother from their father—would he now save her? The present, the destructive past, and the story of a worker's life are tightly integrated here. There is oppression and there are moral choices to make in life, although here, as in so much of the fiction of the last 30 years, they exist only at a personal level."

Critic Charles Taylor in Salon regards Frances' reaction to the sermon as merely a "distaste for cheap ironies" rather an acknowledgement of her own needs. As such, she short-circuits the sermon and clings to her role as the protective sister.

Literary critic Nasrullah Mambrol observes that the sibling's shared childhood trauma has forged Frank (Francis) and Frances, as their androgynous names suggests, into mutually sustaining identities.

It becomes ever clearer…that [Frances] is spiritually alive only when she is protecting her brother…The story makes the psychological concept of codependency potently eerie."

== Sources ==
- English, Sandy. 2010. "A sense of unease: Tobias Wolff's recent fiction collected in Our Story Begins." World Socialist Web Site, August 10, 2010.https://www.wsws.org/en/articles/2010/08/wolf-a10.html Accessed 23 October, 2026.
- Mambrol, Nasrullah. 2020. "Analysis of Tobias Wolff's Stories." Literary Theory and Criticism. June 26, 2020. https://literariness.org/2020/06/26/analysis-of-tobias-wolffs-stories/ Accessed 15 November, 2026.
- Taylor, Charles. 1996. Charles Taylor reviews Tobias Wolff's "The Night In Question." Salon, October 14, 1996. https://www.salon.com/1996/10/14/sneakpeeks_159/ Accessed October 22, 2026.
- Wolff, Tobias. 1996. "The Night in Question." The New Yorker, April 15, 1996. https://www.newyorker.com/magazine/1996/04/22/the-night-in-question Accessed October 24, 2026.
- Wolff, Tobias. 1996. The Night in Question: Stories. Alfred A. Knopf, New York. ISBN 978-0679781554 (hardback).
