= Paul Gervais (disambiguation) =

Paul Gervais (1816–1879) was a French palaeontologist and entomologist.

Paul Gervais may also refer to:

- Paul Gervais (painter) (1859–1944), French painter
- Paul Gervais (writer) (born 1946), American novelist and garden-designer
- Paul Mullins Gervais (1925–1997), Liberal party member of the Canadian House of Commons
