= Ugly Rumours =

Ugly Rumours may refer to:

- Ugly Rumours (band), a British rock band founded by former UK prime minister Tony Blair
- Ugly Rumours (novel), a 1975 novel about the Vietnam War by Tobias Wolff
