= This Boy's Life =

1993 film by Michael Caton-Jones

- Theatrical release poster
- Directed by: Michael Caton-Jones
- Screenplay by: Robert Getchell
- Based on: This Boy's Life by Tobias Wolff
- Produced by: Fitch Cady; Art Linson
- Starring: Robert De Niro; Ellen Barkin; Leonardo DiCaprio
- Cinematography: David Watkin
- Edited by: Jim Clark
- Music by: Carter Burwell
- Production company: Knickerbocker Films
- Distributed by: Warner Bros.
- Release date: April 9, 1993
- Running time: 115 minutes
- Country: United States
- Language: English
- Box office: $4.1 million

This Boy's Life (titled onscreen as This Boy's Life: A True Story) is a 1993 American biographical coming-of-age drama film directed by Michael Caton-Jones. It is based on the eponymous memoir by author Tobias Wolff. The film stars Robert De Niro, Ellen Barkin and Leonardo DiCaprio (in his first feature-film lead role). The cast also features Chris Cooper, Carla Gugino and Eliza Dushku, as well as Tobey Maguire in his first credited appearance in a feature film.

It is the first on-screen collaboration of Maguire and DiCaprio, both of whom would work on Don's Plum (2001) and The Great Gatsby (2013). It is also the first on-screen collaboration of DiCaprio and De Niro, both of whom would work together in Marvin's Room (1996), the short film The Audition (2015) and Killers of the Flower Moon (2023).

== Plot ==
In 1957, young Tobias Wolff and his nomadic, free-spirited mother Caroline arrive in Salt Lake City in search of a fresh start. After being followed by an unwelcome ex-boyfriend, Caroline impulsively moves Toby to Seattle instead.

Six months later, Toby has become a juvenile delinquent, prefers to be called Jack, and is unimpressed with Caroline's pompous new suitor Dwight Hansen. For Thanksgiving, Dwight brings Caroline and Jack to his home in Concrete, a small town near the northern Cascade Mountains. Introducing them to his three children, Dwight is secretly furious when Caroline outperforms him at the town turkey shoot.

After the rebellious Jack is suspended from school, Caroline sends him to live with Dwight for the next few months, revealing she is considering marrying him. Dwight's domineering nature soon becomes apparent as he berates Jack on the frightening drive to Concrete. Controlling and insecure, he forces Jack to join the Boy Scouts and withholds his paper route money.

Caroline and Dwight are married, and she discovers his abusive ways on their wedding night, but believes he is having a positive influence on her son. After a fistfight with his classmate Arthur Gayle, an effeminate misfit, Jack is subjected to a humiliating boxing lesson by Dwight, but soon befriends Arthur. Jack endures continued abuse from Dwight, who selfishly trades Jack's rifle for a dog, and badly beats Jack for taking a joyride in his car.

Two years later, Jack has returned to his delinquent ways, while Caroline stands up to Dwight and decides to work for the Kennedy campaign. Jack realizes he has been acting like Dwight, straining his friendship with Arthur, but dedicates himself to joining his older brother in Princeton. Although Dwight tries to discard Jack's applications to East Coast preparatory schools, Arthur helps him falsify his grades.

After numerous rejections, Jack resigns himself to life in Concrete. Taking a job at the A&P, he manages to impress an interviewer for the Hill School in Pottstown, Pennsylvania, and earns a full scholarship. He defends himself in a violent fight with Dwight and is saved by Caroline; They finally leave Dwight and Concrete behind. Preparing to make the journey to school, Jack says goodbye to his mother as she boards a bus to her own new life.

Some time later, Dwight has died in Concrete; his children have raised their own families in Seattle; Arthur has become a successful businessman in Italy; Caroline has happily remarried; Tobias Wolff was kicked out of school and served in the Vietnam War before becoming a writer and professor with a family of his own.

== Cast ==
- Robert De Niro as Dwight Hansen
- Ellen Barkin as Caroline Wolff Hansen
- Leonardo DiCaprio as Tobias "Toby" Wolff
- Chris Cooper as Roy
- Eliza Dushku as Pearl Hansen
- Jonah Blechman as Arthur Gayle
- Kathy Kinney as Marian
- Gerrit Graham as Mr. Howard
- Carla Gugino as Norma Hansen
- Zack Ansley as Skipper Hansen
- Tracey Ellis as Kathy
- Tobey Maguire as Chuck Bolger
- Michael Bacall as Terry Taylor
- Lee Wilkof as Principal Skippy
- Sean Murray as Jimmy Voorhees
- Deanna Milligan and Morgan Brayton as Silver Sisters
- Bill Dow as Vice Principal
- Jen Taylor as Deputy O'Riley (uncredited)

== Production ==
This Boy's Life is adapted from Tobias Wolff's 1989 memoir, recounting his experiences with abusive stepfather Dwight Hansen in the 1950s. The screen rights were acquired by Peter Guber, head of Guber-Peters Productions at Warner Bros. Pictures, shortly after the memoir's 1989 publication.

Following Guber's departure to lead Sony Pictures Entertainment, Art Linson assumed the role of producer. Although Guber is credited as an executive producer alongside his producing partner Jon Peters, Warner Bros. initially hesitated to produce the film, deeming it commercially unviable due to its child-abuse story. Despite this, director Michael Caton-Jones insisted on the project, and the studio relented due to Caton-Jones's successful directorial track record.

After Guber obtained the rights, screenwriter Robert Getchell expressed interest in writing the script. Getchell, known for adapting Tobias Wolff's older brother's memoir, Geoffrey Wolff's The Duke of Deception, was captivated by the brothers' stories and was eager to adapt the younger brother's memoir.

The film adaptation altered Geoffrey Wolff's name to Gregory. Tobias Wolff also requested changes, such as renaming his mother from Rosemary to Caroline to reflect scenes created by Getchell that were not in the original book, depicting marital discord between his mother and stepfather Dwight. This alteration transformed the true story into a work of fiction, a fact initially contested by Wolff. However, after viewing the finished film, Wolff approved, recognizing that his mother might be upset about the name change.

This Boy's Life marks the first cinematic lead role by actor Leonardo DiCaprio, who portrayed Toby at seventeen years old during filming. Christian Bale was considered for the role of Toby but lost to DiCaprio. Initially, Debra Winger was to star as Caroline but withdrew due to scheduling conflicts, leading to Ellen Barkin taking the role. Actor Robert De Niro, playing the abusive stepfather Dwight, extensively consulted with Tobias Wolff while preparing for the role. However, De Niro chose not to contact the real-life Dwight, who eventually died before filming commenced.

Principal photography began on February 23, 1992, in Vancouver, British Columbia, Canada. Dwight's dilapidated house, constructed in the woods outside of Vancouver, served as the primary set. Filming also took place for ten days in Concrete, Washington, where crews restored the town's main street to its 1950s appearance. Many of the town's citizens were used as extras, and all external scenes in Concrete (and some internal scenes, as well) were shot in and around the town, including the former elementary school buildings and the Concrete High School building. Additional scenes were shot in the La Sal Mountains, and Moab and Salt Lake City, Utah.

== Release ==
=== Box office ===
The film went into limited release on April 9, 1993, and earned $74,425 that weekend; in its wide release on April 23, the film opened at number 10 at the box office and grossed $1,519,678. The film earned a domestic gross of $4,104,962.

=== Critical response ===
On review aggregator website Rotten Tomatoes, the film holds an approval rating of 76% based on 37 reviews, with an average rating of 6.4/10. The site's critics consensus states: "A harrowing, moving drama about a young boy, his single mother, and his abusive stepfather, This Boy's Life benefits from its terrific cast, and features a breakout performance from a young Leonardo DiCaprio." Metacritic assigned the film a weighted average score of 60 out of 100, based on 16 critics, indicating "mixed or average" reviews. Audiences polled by CinemaScore gave the film an average grade of A− on a scale of A+ to F.

Roger Ebert of the Chicago Sun-Times called De Niro's performance "one of his most distinctive".

=== Home media ===
This Boy's Life was released on VHS on September 1, 1993, on LaserDisc in November 1993, and on DVD on May 13, 2003.

== Soundtrack ==
The soundtrack of This Boy's Life uses many songs from the 1950s and early 1960s. The main titles (filmed in Professor Valley, Utah) feature Frank Sinatra's version of "Let's Get Away from It All" from his 1958 album Come Fly with Me.

Toby and Caroline sing "I'm Gonna Wash That Man Right Outa My Hair" from the popular postwar musical South Pacific. However, most of the music reflects Toby's fondness for rock and roll and doo-wop, including songs by Eddie Cochran, Frankie Lymon and the Teenagers and Link Wray. Carter Burwell composed the film's score, which features New York guitarist Frederic Hand.

== See also ==
- List of 1990s films based on actual events
