= The Hundred Brothers =

1997 novel by Donald Antrim

- First edition cover
- Author: Donald Antrim
- Cover artist: Jacket design by Lynn Buckley. Photograph: Willinger / FPG
- Language: English
- Publisher: Crown
- Publication date: 1997-01-28
- Publication place: United States
- Media type: Print (hardcover & paperback)
- Pages: 188 pp (first edition, hc)
- ISBN: 9780517703106

The Hundred Brothers is a 1997 novel by American author Donald Antrim. The novel was a finalist for the PEN/Faulkner Award in 1998. In his introduction to the novel, Jonathan Franzen wrote, "The Hundred Brothers is possibly the strangest novel ever published by an American. Its author, Donald Antrim, is arguably more unlike any other living writer than any other living writer."
