= PEN/Malamud Award =

Annual award for excellence in the art of the short story

- Awarded for: Short story award
- Sponsored by: International PEN
- Date: 1988
- Country: United States
- Website: https://www.penfaulkner.org/pen-malamud-award

The PEN/Bernard and Ann Malamud Award honors "excellence in the art of the short story". It is awarded annually by the PEN/Faulkner Foundation. The selection committee is composed of PEN/Faulkner directors. The award was first given in 1988.

== Award winners ==
PEN/Malamud Award winners
Year	Winner	Ref.
1988	John Updike	
1989	Saul Bellow	
1990	George Garrett	
1991	Frederick Busch	
1991	Andre Dubus	
1992	Eudora Welty	
1993	Peter Taylor	
1994	Grace Paley	
1995	Stuart Dybek	
1995	William Maxwell	
1996	Joyce Carol Oates	
1997	Alice Munro	
1998	John Barth	
1999	T. Coraghessan Boyle	
2000	Ann Beattie	
2000	Nathan Englander	
2001	Sherman Alexie	
2001	Richard Ford	
2002	Junot Díaz	
2002	Ursula K. Le Guin	
2003	Barry Hannah	
2003	Maile Meloy	
2004	Richard Bausch	
2004	Nell Freudenberger	
2005	Lorrie Moore	
2006	Adam Haslett	
2006	Tobias Wolff	
2007	Elizabeth Spencer	
2008	Peter Ho Davies	
2008	Cynthia Ozick	
2009	Amy Hempel	
2009	Alistair MacLeod	
2010	Edward P. Jones	
2010	Nam Le	
2011	Edith Pearlman	
2012	James Salter	
2013	George Saunders	
2015	Deborah Eisenberg	
2016	Joy Williams	
2017	Jhumpa Lahiri	
2018	Amina Gautier	
2018	Joan Silber	
2019	John Edgar Wideman	
2020	Lydia Davis	
2021	Charles Baxter	
2022	Yiyun Li	
2023	Edwidge Danticat	
2024	Ted Chiang	
2025	David Means	
2026	Elizabeth McCracken	
