= The Afterlife: A Memoir =

2006 book by Donald Antrim

The Afterlife:A Memoir
- First edition cover
- Author: Donald Antrim
- Language: English
- Publisher: Farrar, Straus & Giroux
- Publication date: 2006
- Publication place: United States
- Media type: Print (hardcover & paperback)
- Pages: 193 pp
- ISBN: 978-0312426354

The Afterlife is an American memoir written by Donald Antrim. The book became a finalist for the National Book Critics Circle award in 2007.

The memoir's primary theme is Antrim's torturous relationship with his alcoholic, manipulative, and mentally ill mother, Louanne Antrim (née Self). Relationships with other members of the author's family are explored, but all of these relationships are presented as essentially subordinate to Antrim's relationship with his mother.

== Early versions and original publications ==
- Black Mountain, 1977
- I Bought A Bed
- A.K.A. Sam
- Ad Nauseam
- Church
- The Kimono
- A Man in the Kitchen
