= Richard Wiley =

American novelist and short story writer (born 1944)

- Born: November 19, 1944 (age 81)
- Education: University of Puget Sound (BA); Sophia University (MA); Iowa Writers' Workshop (MFA)
- Occupations: Novelist; short story writer
- Writing career
- Notable awards: PEN/Faulkner Award for Fiction (1987)

Richard Wiley (born November 19, 1944) is an American novelist and short story writer whose first novel, Soldiers in Hiding won the 1987 PEN/Faulkner Award for Fiction. He has published five other novels and a number of short stories (see "Works" below).

Wiley holds a B.A. from the University of Puget Sound and an M.A. from Sophia University in Tokyo; he earned his MFA in creative writing from the Iowa Writers' Workshop, where he studied under John Irving. Since 1989 he has been a professor of English at the University of Nevada, Las Vegas. Wiley is professor emeritus of English and a board member of Black Mountain Institute at the University of Nevada, Las Vegas. Wiley was a member of the UNLV English Department faculty from 1989 to 2015 and cofounded UNLV's graduate Creative Writing Program.

He was inducted into the Nevada Writers Hall of Fame in 2005.

== Works ==
- Soldiers in Hiding. Boston: Atlantic Monthly P, 1986. ISBN 978-0-87113-046-4
- Fools' Gold. New York: Knopf, 1988. ISBN 978-0-394-56865-2
- Festival for Three Thousand Maidens. New York: Dutton, 1991. ISBN 978-0-525-24950-4
- Indigo. New York: Dutton, 1992. ISBN 978-0-525-93547-6
- Ahmed's Revenge. New York: Random House, 1998. ISBN 978-0-679-45744-2
- Commodore Perry's Minstrel Show. Austin: U of Texas P, 2007. ISBN 978-0-292-71470-0
- The Book of Important Moments. Dzanc, 2013. ISBN 978-1938604454
- Tacoma Stories. Bellevue Literary Press, 2019. ISBN 9781942658559
