= The Verificationist =

2000 novel by Donald Antrim

- First edition cover
- Author: Donald Antrim
- Cover artist: John Gall
- Language: English
- Publisher: Knopf
- Publication date: February 15, 2000
- Publication place: United States
- Media type: Print (hardcover & paperback)
- Pages: 168 pp (2011 ed.)
- ISBN: 978-0312662141

The Verificationist is a 2000 novel by American author Donald Antrim that follows a group of psychoanalysts who come together for a pancake supper. The New York Times called it, "A Freudian free-for-all," while George Saunders hailed it as "one of the most pleasure-giving, perverse, complicated, and addictive novels in the past 20 years".
