= Villa Massei =

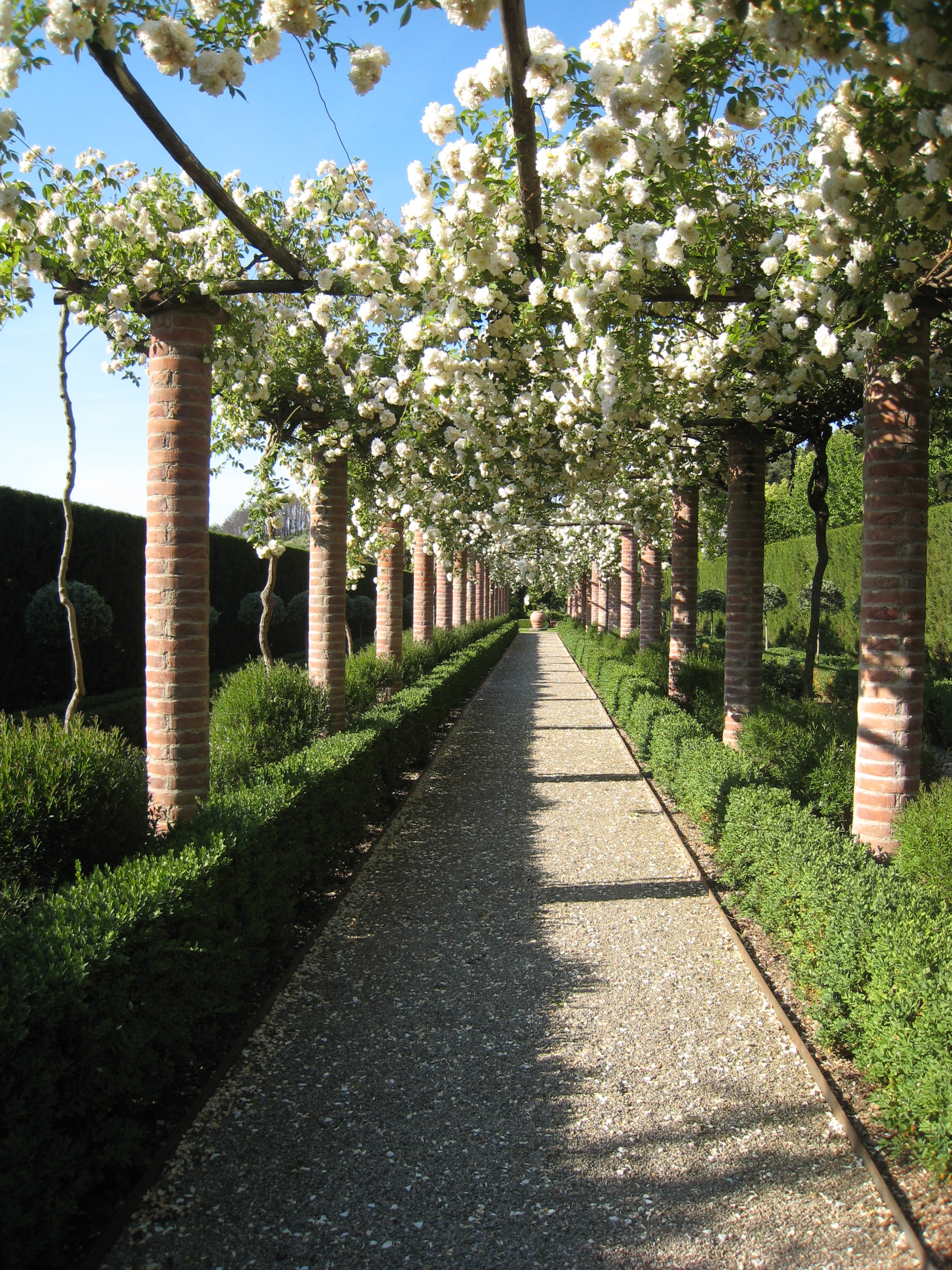
The Umbraculum at Villa Massei

Villa Massei is a 16th-century hunting lodge and 60 acres estate in Massa Macinaia, in Capannori, not far near the ancient walled city of Lucca, Italy, known for its fine gardens, which are visited by hundreds of garden lovers from all over the world annually.

The house was built by the Counts Sinibaldi in about 1500, and was inherited by the Marchesi Massei in the 18th century, nephews of the Sinibaldi. In the 1950s the property was home to Lionel Fielden, founder of All India Radio and author of The Natural Bent. In 1981 Gil Cohen and Paul Gervais, both of Boston, bought the estate, and over the years have developed its garden, which "represents the best of old and new, an 'exquisite recreation' of a Renaissance garden, complete with lemon trees in terracotta pots, and inspired innovations introduced by its visionary new owners." Gervais and Cohen sold the property to a Dutch family in 2014.

== Bibliography ==
- A Garden in Lucca, Paul Gervais, Hyperion 2000, New York
- Un Giardino a Lucca: la storia illustrata, Paul Gervais, Idea Books 2007, Viareggio/Milano
- Gardens of Florence and Tuscany, Mariachiara Pozzana, Giunti 2001, Prato
- Sun-Drenched Gardens, Jan Smithen, Harry N. Abrams, Inc. 2002, New York
- Gardens of Europe, Charles Quest-Ritson, Garden Art Press 2007, Woodbridge, Suffolk, England
- In Search of Paradise, Great Gardens of the World, Penelope Hobhouse, Frances Lincoln Limited 2006, London
- Italy's Private Gardens, Helena Attlee, Frances Lincoln Limited 2010, London
- The Best Gardens in Italy, Kristy McLeod, Frances Lincoln Limited 2011, London
- Dream Gardens, Tania Compton and Andrew Lawson, Merrell New York, London 2010
