= Ugly Rumours (novel) =

1975 novel by Tobias Wolff

- First (and only) edition cover (publ. Allen & Unwin)
- Author: Tobias Wolff
- Subject: Vietnam War
- Genre: War novel
- Publication date: 1975
- Pages: 207 pages
- ISBN: 0048231177
- OCLC: 1342091

Ugly Rumours was the first novel by American writer Tobias Wolff. It was published only in Britain, in 1975, and has never been reprinted. The book does not appear in Wolff's list of publications included in recent books—the London Review of Books commented on this omission, stating that "to read (Ugly Rumours) is to understand why (it was omitted from the list of publications)"—and when his novel Old School was published in 2004, all publicity copy referred to it as his first novel.

In 2003, Wolff described Rumours as "terrible", saying that it was "the best (he) could do at the time, but it really wasn't very good", and that it now "embarrasses" him.

In 2011, Wolff stated that he has "no feeling for the book now, no interest in it, and no interest in attracting attention to it by talking about it."

== Plot summary ==
During the Vietnam War, two Special Forces soldiers attempt to avoid combat duty.
