= PEN/Faulkner Award for Fiction =

American literary award

- Awarded for: Fiction
- Sponsored by: PEN/Faulkner Foundation
- Country: United States
- Website: penfaulkner.org

The PEN/Faulkner Award for Fiction is awarded annually by the PEN/Faulkner Foundation to the authors of the year's best works of fiction by living Americans, Green Card holders or permanent residents. The winner receives US$15,000 and each of four runners-up receives US$5000. Judges read citations for each of the finalists' works at the presentation ceremony in Washington, D.C. The organization claims it to be "the largest peer-juried award in the country." The award was first given in 1981.

Mary Lee Settle was one of the founders of the PEN/Faulkner Award following the controversy at the 1979 National Book Award, when PEN America voted for a boycott on the grounds that the award had become too commercial.

== PEN/Faulkner Award for Fiction ==
=== 1980s ===
PEN/Faulkner Award for Fiction winners, 1981–1989
Year	Author	Title	Result
1981	Walter Abish	How German Is It	Winner
1981	Shirley Hazzard	The Transit of Venus	Shortlist
1981	Walker Percy	The Second Coming	Shortlist
1981	Gilbert Sorrentino	Aberration of Starlight	Shortlist
1981	John Kennedy Toole	A Confederacy of Dunces	Shortlist
1982	David Bradley	The Chaneysville Incident	Winner
1982	Donald Barthelme	Sixty Stories	Shortlist
1982	Richard Bausch	Take Me Back	Shortlist
1982	Mark Helprin	Ellis Island and Other Stories	Shortlist
1982	Marilynne Robinson	Housekeeping	Shortlist
1982	Robert Stone	A Flag for Sunrise	Shortlist
1983	Toby Olson	Seaview	Winner
1983	Maureen Howard	Grace Abounding	Shortlist
1983	Bobbie Ann Mason	Shiloh and Other Stories	Shortlist
1983	George Steiner	The Portage to San Cristobal of A.H.	Shortlist
1983	Anne Tyler	Dinner at the Homesick Restaurant	Shortlist
1983	William S. Wilson	Birthplace	Shortlist
1984	John Edgar Wideman	Sent for You Yesterday	Winner
1984	Ron Hansen	The Assassination of Jesse James by the Coward Robert Ford	Shortlist
1984	William Kennedy	Ironweed	Shortlist
1984	Jamaica Kincaid	At the Bottom of the River	Shortlist
1984	Bernard Malamud	The Stories	Shortlist
1984	Cynthia Ozick	The Cannibal Galaxy	Shortlist
1985	Tobias Wolff	The Barracks Thief	Winner
1985	Harriet Doerr	Stones for Ibarra	Shortlist
1985	Donald Hays	The Dixie Association	Shortlist
1985	David Leavitt	Family Dancing	Shortlist
1985	James Purdy	On Glory's Course	Shortlist
1986	Peter Taylor	The Old Forest and Other Stories	Winner
1986	William Gaddis	Carpenter's Gothic	Shortlist
1986	Larry McMurtry	Lonesome Dove	Shortlist
1986	Hugh Nissenson	The Tree of Life	Shortlist
1986	Helen Norris	The Christmas Wife: Stories	Shortlist
1986	Grace Paley	Later the Same Day	Shortlist
1987	Richard Wiley	Soldiers in Hiding	Winner
1987	Richard Ford	The Sportswriter	Shortlist
1987	Maureen Howard	Expensive Habits	Shortlist
1987	Charles R. Johnson	The Sorcerer's Apprentice	Shortlist
1987	Janet Kauffman	Collaborators	Shortlist
1988	T. C. Boyle	World's End	Winner
1988	Richard Bausch	Spirits, And Other Stories	Shortlist
1988	Alice McDermott	That Night	Shortlist
1988	Cynthia Ozick	The Messiah of Stockholm	Shortlist
1988	Lawrence Thornton	Imagining Argentina	Shortlist
1989	James Salter	Dusk and Other Stories	Winner
1989	Mary McGarry Morris	Vanished	Shortlist
1989	Thomas Savage	The Corner of Rife and Pacific	Shortlist
1989	Isaac Bashevis Singer	The Death of Methuselah and Other Stories	Shortlist

=== 1990s ===
PEN/Faulkner Award for Fiction winners, 1990–1999
Year	Author	Title	Result	Ref.
1990	E. L. Doctorow	Billy Bathgate	Winner	
1990	Russell Banks	Affliction	Shortlist	
1990	Molly Gloss	The Jump-Off Creek	Shortlist	
1990	Josephine Jacobsen	On the Island: New and Selected Stories	Shortlist	
1990	Lynne Sharon Schwartz	Leaving Brooklyn	Shortlist	
1991	John Edgar Wideman	Philadelphia Fire	Winner	
1991	Paul Auster	The Music of Chance	Shortlist	
1991	Joanne Meschery	A Gentleman's Guide to the Frontier	Shortlist	
1991	Steven Millhauser	The Barnum Museum	Shortlist	
1991	Joanna Scott	Arrogance	Shortlist	
1992	Don DeLillo	Mao II	Winner	
1992	Stephen Dixon	Frog	Shortlist	
1992	Paul Gervais	Extraordinary People	Shortlist	
1992	Allan Gurganus	White People	Shortlist	
1993	E. Annie Proulx	Postcards	Winner	
1993	Francisco Goldman	The Long Night of White Chickens	Shortlist	
1993	Maureen Howard	Natural History	Shortlist	
1993	Robert Olen Butler	A Good Scent from a Strange Mountain	Shortlist	
1993	Sylvia Watanabe	Talking to the Dead		
1994	Philip Roth	Operation Shylock	Winner	
1994	Stanley Elkin	Van Gogh's Room at Arles	Shortlist	
1994	Dagoberto Gilb	The Magic of Blood	Shortlist	
1994	Fae Myenne Ng	Bone	Shortlist	
1994	Kate Wheeler	Not Where I Started From	Shortlist	
1995	David Guterson	Snow Falling on Cedars	Winner	
1995	Frederick Busch	The Children in the Woods	Shortlist	
1995	Joyce Carol Oates	What I Lived For	Shortlist	
1995	Ursula Hegi	Stones from the River	Shortlist	
1995	Joanna Scott	Various Antidotes	Shortlist	
1996	Richard Ford	Independence Day	Winner	
1996	William H. Gass	The Tunnel	Shortlist	
1996	Claire Messud	When The World Was Steady	Shortlist	
1996	Madison Smartt Bell	All Souls' Rising	Shortlist	
1996	A. J. Verdelle	The Good Negress	Shortlist	
1997	Gina Berriault	Women in Their Beds	Winner	
1997	Daniel Akst	St. Burl's Obituary	Shortlist	
1997	Kathleen Cambor	The Book of Mercy	Shortlist	
1997	Ron Hansen	Atticus	Shortlist	
1997	Jamaica Kincaid	The Autobiography of My Mother	Shortlist	
1998	Rafi Zabor	The Bear Comes Home	Winner	
1998	Donald Antrim	The Hundred Brothers	Shortlist	
1998	Rilla Askew	The Mercy Seat	Shortlist	
1998	Mary Gaitskill	Because They Wanted To	Shortlist	
1998	Francisco Goldman	The Ordinary Seaman	Shortlist	
1999	Michael Cunningham	The Hours	Winner	
1999	Russell Banks	Cloudsplitter	Shortlist	
1999	Barbara Kingsolver	The Poisonwood Bible	Shortlist	
1999	Brian Morton	Starting Out in the Evening	Shortlist	
1999	Richard Selzer	The Doctor Stories	Shortlist	

=== 2000s ===
PEN/Faulkner Award for Fiction winners, 2000–2009
Year	Author	Title	Result	Ref.
2000	Ha Jin	Waiting	Winner	
2000	Frederick Busch	The Night Inspector	Shortlist	
2000	Ken Kalfus	Pu-239 And Other Russian Fantasies	Shortlist	
2000	Elizabeth Strout	Amy and Isabelle	Shortlist	
2000	Lily Tuck	Siam, or the Woman Who Shot a Man	Shortlist	
2001	Philip Roth	The Human Stain	Winner	
2001	Michael Chabon	The Amazing Adventures of Kavalier and Clay	Shortlist	
2001	Millicent Dillon	Harry Gold	Shortlist	
2001	Denis Johnson	The Name of the World	Shortlist	
2001	Mona Simpson	Off Keck Road	Shortlist	
2002	Ann Patchett	Bel Canto	Winner	
2002	Karen Joy Fowler	Sister Noon	Shortlist	
2002	Jonathan Franzen	The Corrections	Shortlist	
2002	Claire Messud	The Hunters	Shortlist	
2002	Manil Suri	The Death of Vishnu	Shortlist	
2003	Sabina Murray	The Caprices	Winner	
2003	Peter Cameron	The City of Your Final Destination	Shortlist	
2003	William Kennedy	Roscoe	Shortlist	
2003	Victor LaValle	The Ecstatic	Shortlist	
2003	Gilbert Sorrentino	Little Casino	Shortlist	
2004	John Updike	The Early Stories: 1953-1975	Winner	
2004	Frederick Barthelme	Elroy Nights	Shortlist	
2004	ZZ Packer	Drinking Coffee Elsewhere	Shortlist	
2004	Caryl Phillips	A Distant Shore	Shortlist	
2004	Tobias Wolff	Old School	Shortlist	
2005	Ha Jin	War Trash	Winner	
2005	Jerome Charyn	The Green Lantern	Shortlist	
2005	Edwidge Danticat	The Dew Breaker	Shortlist	
2005	Marilynne Robinson	Gilead	Shortlist	
2005	Steve Yarbrough	Prisoners of War	Shortlist	
2006	E. L. Doctorow	The March	Winner	
2006	Karen Fisher	A Sudden Country	Shortlist	
2006	William Henry Lewis	I Got Somebody in Staunton	Shortlist	
2006	James Salter	Last Night	Shortlist	
2006	Bruce Wagner	The Chrysanthemum Palace	Shortlist	
2007	Philip Roth	Everyman	Winner	
2007	Charles D'Ambrosio	The Dead Fish Museum	Shortlist	
2007	Deborah Eisenberg	Twilight of the Superheroes	Shortlist	
2007	Amy Hempel	The Collected Stories of Amy Hempel	Shortlist	
2007	Edward P. Jones	All Aunt Hagar's Children	Shortlist	
2008	Kate Christensen	The Great Man	Winner	
2008	Annie Dillard	The Maytrees	Shortlist	
2008	David Leavitt	The Indian Clerk	Shortlist	
2008	T. M. McNally	The Gateway	Shortlist	
2008	Ron Rash	Chemistry and Other Stories	Shortlist	
2009	Joseph O'Neill	Netherland	Winner	
2009	Sarah Shun-lien Bynum	Ms. Hempel Chronicles	Shortlist	
2009	Susan Choi	A Person of Interest	Shortlist	
2009	Richard Price	Lush Life	Shortlist	
2009	Ron Rash	Serena	Shortlist	

=== 2010s ===
PEN/Faulkner Award for Fiction winners, 2010–2019
Year	Author	Title	Result	Ref.
2010	Sherman Alexie	War Dances	Winner	
2010	Barbara Kingsolver	The Lacuna	Shortlist	
2010	Lorraine Lopéz	Homicide Survivors Picnic	Shortlist	
2010	Lorrie Moore	A Gate at the Stairs	Shortlist	
2010	Colson Whitehead	Sag Harbor	Shortlist	
2011	Deborah Eisenberg	The Collected Stories of Deborah Eisenberg	Winner	
2011	Jennifer Egan	A Visit from the Goon Squad	Shortlist	
2011	Jaimy Gordon	Lord of Misrule	Shortlist	
2011	Eric Puchner	Model Home	Shortlist	
2011	Brad Watson	Aliens in the Prime of Their Lives: Stories	Shortlist	
2012	Julie Otsuka	The Buddha in the Attic	Winner	
2012	Russell Banks	Lost Memory of Skin	Shortlist	
2012	Don DeLillo	The Angel Esmeralda	Shortlist	
2012	Anita Desai	The Artist of Disappearance	Shortlist	
2012	Steven Millhauser	We Others: New and Selected Stories	Shortlist	
2013	Benjamin Alire Sáenz	Everything Begins and Ends at the Kentucky Club	Winner	
2013	Amelia Gray	THREATS	Shortlist	
2013	Laird Hunt	Kind One	Shortlist	
2013	T. Geronimo Johnson	Hold It 'Til It Hurts	Shortlist	
2013	Thomas Mallon	Watergate	Shortlist	
2014	Karen Joy Fowler	We Are All Completely Beside Ourselves	Winner	
2014	Daniel Alarcón	At Night We Walk in Circles	Shortlist	
2014	Percival Everett	Percival Everett by Virgil Russell	Shortlist	
2014	Joan Silber	Fools	Shortlist	
2014	Valerie Trueblood	Search Party: Stories of Rescue	Shortlist	
2015	Atticus Lish	Preparation for the Next Life	Winner	
2015	Jeffrey Renard Allen	Song of the Shank	Shortlist	
2015	Jennifer Clement	Prayers for the Stolen	Shortlist	
2015	Jenny Offill	Dept. of Speculation	Shortlist	
2015	Emily St. John Mandel	Station Eleven	Shortlist	
2016	James Hannaham	Delicious Foods	Winner	
2016	Julie Iromuanya	Mr. and Mrs. Doctor	Shortlist	
2016	Viet Thanh Nguyen	The Sympathizer	Shortlist	
2016	Elizabeth Tallent	Mendocino Fire: Stories	Shortlist	
2016	Luis Alberto Urrea	The Water Museum: Stories	Shortlist	
2017	Imbolo Mbue	Behold the Dreamers	Winner	
2017	Viet Dinh	After Disasters	Shortlist	
2017	Louise Erdrich	LaRose	Shortlist	
2017	Garth Greenwell	What Belongs to You	Shortlist	
2017	Sunil Yapa	Your Heart is a Muscle the Size of a Fist	Shortlist	
2018	Joan Silber	Improvement	Winner	
2018	Hernán Diaz	In the Distance	Shortlist	
2018	Samantha Hunt	The Dark Dark	Shortlist	
2018	Achy Obejas	The Tower of the Antilles	Shortlist	
2018	Jesmyn Ward	Sing, Unburied, Sing	Shortlist	
2019	Azareen Van der Vliet Oloomi	Call Me Zebra	Winner	
2019	Blanche McCrary Boyd	Tomb of the Unknown Racist	Shortlist	
2019	Richard Powers	The Overstory	Shortlist	
2019	Ivelisse Rodriguez	Love War Stories	Shortlist	
2019	Willy Vlautin	Don't Skip Out on Me	Shortlist	

=== 2020s ===
PEN/Faulkner Award for Fiction winners, 2020–2029
Year	Author	Title	Result	Ref.
2020	Chloe Aridjis	Sea Monsters	Winner	
2020	Yiyun Li	Where Reasons End	Shortlist	
2020	Peter Rock	The Night Swimmers	Shortlist	
2020	Maurice Carlos Ruffin	We Cast a Shadow	Shortlist	
2020	Ocean Vuong	On Earth We're Briefly Gorgeous	Shortlist	
2021	Deesha Philyaw	The Secret Lives of Church Ladies	Winner	
2021	Matthew Salesses	Disappear Doppelgänger Disappear	Shortlist	
2021	Rufi Thorpe	The Knockout Queen	Shortlist	
2021	Robin Wasserman	Mother Daughter Widow Wife	Shortlist	
2021	Steve Wiegenstein	Scattered Lights	Shortlist	
2022	Rabih Alameddine	The Wrong End of the Telescope	Winner	
2022	Nawaaz Ahmed	Radiant Fugitives	Shortlist	
2022	Carolyn Ferrell	Dear Miss Metropolitan	Shortlist	
2022	Imbolo Mbue	How Beautiful We Were	Shortlist	
2022	Carolina de Robertis	The President and the Frog	Shortlist	
2023	Yiyun Li	The Book of Goose	Winner	
2023	Jonathan Escoffery	If I Survive You	Shortlist	
2023	Laura Warrell	Sweet, Soft, Plenty Rhythm	Shortlist	
2023	Dionne Irving	The Islands	Shortlist	
2023	Kathryn Harlan	Fruiting Bodies: Stories	Shortlist	
2024	Claire Jiménez	What Happened to Ruthy Ramirez	Winner	
2024	Jamel Brinkley	Witness	Shortlist	
2024	Henry Hoke	Open Throat	Shortlist	
2024	Alice McDermott	Absolution	Shortlist	
2024	Colin Winnette	Users	Shortlist	
2025	Garth Greenwell	Small Rain	Winner	
2025	Percival Everett	James	Shortlist	
2025	Danzy Senna	Colored Television	Shortlist	
2025	Pemi Aguda	Ghostroots	Shortlist	
2025	Susan Muaddi Darraj	Behind You Is the Sea	Shortlist	
2026	Mahreen Sohail	Small Scale Sinners	Winner	
2026	Addie E. Citchens	Dominion	Shortlist	
2026	Quiara Alegría Hudes	The White Hot	Shortlist	
2026	Jonas Hassen Khemiri	The Sisters	Shortlist	
2026	Lily King	Heart the Lover	Shortlist	
