= Toby Olson =

American novelist

- Born: 1937 (age 88–89); Chicago, Illinois, U.S.
- Education: Occidental College; Long Island University
- Occupation: Novelist
- Writing career
- Notable awards: PEN/Faulkner Award for Fiction (1983); Henry Viscardi Achievement Award (2015)

Toby Olson (born 1937 Chicago) is an American novelist and winner of the 1983 PEN/Faulkner Award for Fiction.

== Life ==
Through high school and his four years in the Navy as a surgical technician, he lived in California, Arizona, and Texas.

He graduated from Occidental College and Long Island University.

He co-founded and taught at the Aspen Writers' Workshop, and at Long Island University and The New School For Social Research, and since 1975 Temple University.

Recently, he has collaborated with composer Paul Epstein, including chamber music, songs, a short story set for voice and piano, and two chamber operas, Dorit, and Chihuahua. Both operas were performed by the Temple University Opera Theater.

He lives in Philadelphia and North Truro, on Cape Cod.

== Awards ==
- 1983 PEN/Faulkner Award, for Seaview
- 1985 Guggenheim Fellowships
- 2015 Henry Viscardi Achievement Awards
- Rockefeller Foundations
- National Endowment for the Arts

== Works ==
=== Novels ===
- Changing Appearance. Membrane. 1975. ISBN 0-87924-021-0.
- The Life of Jesus. New Directions. 1976. ISBN 0-8112-0614-9.
- Aesthetics. Membrane. 1978. ISBN 0-87924-049-0.
- Seaview. New Directions. 1982. ISBN 0-8112-0828-1.
- The Woman Who Escaped From Shame. Random House. 1986. ISBN 978-0-394-54715-2.
- Utah
- Dorit in Lesbos. Linden Press/Simon & Schuster. 1990. ISBN 978-0-671-68486-0.
- At Sea. Simon & Schuster. 1993. ISBN 978-0-671-73641-5.
- Write Letter to Billy. Coffee House Press. 2000. ISBN 978-1-56689-103-5.
- The Blond Box. FC2. 2004. ISBN 978-1-57366-110-2.
- The Bitter Half.
- Tampico. ISBN 978-0-292-71827-2

=== Poetry ===
- The Wrestlers & other poems. Barlenmir House, 1984
- We are the fire: a selection of poems. New Directions Publishing. 1984. ISBN 978-0-8112-0914-4. "Toby Olson."
- Unfinished Building. Coffee House Press. 1993. ISBN 978-1-56689-009-0. "Toby Olson."
- Human Nature. New Directions. 2000. ISBN 978-0-8112-1440-7.
