= Elizabeth Tallent =

American novelist (born 1954)

- Born: Elizabeth Ann Tallent; August 8, 1954 (age 72); Washington, D.C., U.S.

Elizabeth Tallent (born Elizabeth Ann Tallent; August 8, 1954 in Washington, D.C.) is an American fiction writer, academic, and essayist.

== Life ==
Tallent's short stories and essays have been published in literary magazines and journals such as The New Yorker, Esquire, Harper's Magazine, The Threepenny Review, Tin House, Zyzzyva, and North American Review, and her work has been reprinted in the O. Henry Prize Stories, Best American Short Stories, The Best American Essays, and Pushcart Prize collections.

Her memoir Scratched was released in 2020 from Harper. Mendocino Fire, her first collection of short stories in more than 20 years, was published in October 2015. The New York Times Book Review praised Tallent's "ability to create characters who force us to withhold judgment and leave us gasping at their absolute, solid reality." Publishers Weekly called the volume "a smart, thought-provoking study of desire and disappointment." Tin House described it as "driving, furious, erotic, gilded, the sentences flying at you like arrows." The collection is a finalist for the 2016 PEN/Faulkner Award for Fiction.

Tallent has taught literature and creative writing at the University of California, Irvine, the Iowa Writers' Workshop, and the University of California, Davis. She has been a faculty member at Stanford University since 1994, teaching both undergraduates and fellows in the Stegner Fellowship program. In 2007 she was awarded Stanford's Phi Beta Kappa Teaching Award, and in 2008 she received the Northern California Chapter of Phi Beta Kappa's Excellence in Teaching Award, recognizing "the extraordinary gifts, diligence, and amplitude of spirit that mark the best in teaching." In 2009 she was honored with Stanford's Dean's Award for Distinguished Teaching.

In 2014, Tallent was the lead drafter of a letter—signed by 369 of her colleagues at Stanford—requesting that the University divest from fossil fuels.

She lives in Mendocino, California with her wife.

Her son Gabriel is the author of the novel My Absolute Darling (Riverhead, 2017).

== Works ==
=== Novels ===
- Museum Pieces (Knopf, 1985)

=== Short story collections ===
- In Constant Flight (Knopf, 1983)
- Time With Children (Knopf, 1987)
- Honey (Knopf, 1993)
- Mendocino Fire (Harper, 2015)

=== Memoir ===
- Scratched: A Memoir of Perfectionism (Harper, 2020)

=== Literary criticism ===
- Married Men and Magic Tricks: John Updike's Erotic Heroes (Creative Arts Book Co., 1982)
