= Frederick Busch =

American writer

- Born: Frederick Matthew Busch; August 1, 1941; Brooklyn, New York City, U.S.
- Died: February 23, 2006 (aged 64); Manhattan, New York City, U.S.
- Education: Muhlenberg College (BA); Columbia University (MA)
- Occupation: Author
- Spouse: Judith Burroughs
- Children: Benjamin Busch, Nicholas Busch
- Writing career
- Years active: 1971—2006
- Notable work: Girls

Frederick Busch (August 1, 1941 – February 23, 2006) was an American writer who authored nearly thirty books, including volumes of short stories and novels.

== Early life and education ==
Frederick Busch was born in Brooklyn, New York City on August 1, 1941. He graduated from Muhlenberg College in 1962, and earned a master's degree from Columbia University in 1967. Busch and his wife lived briefly in Greenwich Village, where they scraped by until Busch got a job teaching at Colgate University in 1966.

== Career ==
=== Academia ===
Busch was professor of literature at Colgate University in Hamilton, New York, from 1966 to 2003. He also served as acting director of the University of Iowa Writers’ Workshop in 1978–79.

=== Writing ===
Busch had more than 30 books published in his lifetime. He won numerous awards, including the Harry and Ethel Daroff Award in 1985 for Invisible Mending; the American Academy of Arts and Letters Fiction Award in 1986; and the PEN/Malamud Award in 1991.

== Personal life ==
Busch met his future wife, Judith Burroughs, in Allentown, Pennsylvania while attending Muhlenberg College in 1962. They married in 1963.

Busch and his wife had two sons, Benjamin and Nicholas. Benjamin Busch is an actor. In 1995, Nicholas Busch graduated from Muhlenberg College.

== Death ==
On February 23, 2006, Busch died of a heart attack in Manhattan, New York City, aged 64.

== Honours and awards ==
- 1962: Fellowship, Woodrow Wilson Foundation
- 1981: Fellowship, Guggenheim Foundation
- 1981: Fellowship Ingram Merrill Foundation
- 1985: National Jewish Book Award for Fiction, Jewish Book Council
- 1986: American Academy of Arts and Letters Fiction Award
- 1991: PEN/Malamud Award for Excellence in Short Fiction
- 1997: New York Times Notable Book for "Girls: A Novel"
- 1999: National Book Critics Circle Award Nomination for The Night Inspector
- 2000: PEN/Faulkner Award for Fiction finalist, for "The Night Inspector

== Bibliography ==
=== Novels ===
- I Wanted A Year Without Fall - a novel, London: Calder & Boyars, 1971
- Manual Labor - a novel, New York: New Directions, 1974
- Domestic Particulars: a Family Chronicle, New Directions, 1976
- Mutual Friend, New York: Harper & Row, 1978
- Rounds, New York: Farrar, Straus and Giroux, 1980
- Take This Man, Farrar, Straus and Giroux (1981)
- Invisible Mending: a novel, David R. Godine, 1984
- Sometimes I Live in the Country, David R. Godine 1986
- War Babies, New Directions, 1989
- Harry and Catherine, Knopf, 1990
- Closing Arguments, Ticknor & Fields, 1991
- Long Way From Home, Ticknor & Fields, 1993
- Girls: A Novel, Harmony Books, 1997
- The Night Inspector, Harmony Books (1999)
- A Memory of War, W. W. Norton & Co (2003)
- North: A Novel, W. W. Norton & Co (2005) (sequel to Girls)

=== Short story collections ===
- Breathing Trouble and Other Stories, London: Calder and Boyars (1973)
- Hardwater Country - stories, New York: Knopf (1979)
- Too Late American Boyhood Blues: ten stories, David R. Godine (1984)
- Absent Friends, NY: Knopf (1989)
- Children in the Woods: New and Selected Stories, Ticknor & Fields (1994)
- Don't Tell Anyone: Short Stories and a Novella, W. W. Norton & Co (2000)
- Rescue Missions, W. W. Norton & Co (2006)
- The Stories of Frederick Busch, W. W. Norton & Co (2013)

=== Non-fiction ===
- Hawkes: A Guide to his Fictions, Syracuse University Press (1973)
- A Dangerous Profession: A Book about the Writing Life, St. Martin's Press (1998)
- Letters to a Fiction Writer, edited by Frederick Busch; W. W. Norton & Co (1999)
