= Elect Mr. Robinson for a Better World =

Book by Donald Antrim

Elect Mr. Robinson For A Better World
- First edition cover
- Author: Donald Antrim
- Language: English
- Publisher: Viking Adult
- Publication place: United States
- Media type: Print (hardcover & paperback)
- Pages: 192 pp (first edition, hc)
- ISBN: 978-0-670-85139-3

Elect Mr. Robinson for a Better World is a 1993 novel by American author Donald Antrim. It is Antrim's first published novel. The novel depicts the grisly, and occasionally surreal misadventures of a downsized schoolteacher, Pete Robinson, in a vaguely post-apocalyptic America.

== Plot summary ==
As the novel opens, Pete Robinson is supervising the drawing and quartering of the town's mayor by four automobiles. We learn that Pete Robinson is an expert in the history of torture, with special emphasis on the Inquisition, and that he was formerly an elementary schoolteacher before the local school system was entirely defunded. Pete's ambition to run for mayor after resurrecting the local educational system under his own administration—and the thwarting of this ambition—are major elements of the novel's plot. Other elements of the plot include Pete's thwarted attempts to bury pieces of the former Mayor's body in Egyptological rituals, and his wife Meredith's growing detachment as she becomes more involved in ichthyomorphic trances in which she transforms herself into a coelacanth, or ancient fish.

== Style ==
The novel has no chapter breaks, and has been called a "picaresque of comic surrealism." However Jeffrey Eugenides writes:

"'Dystopic' describes neither the madness nor the method here. The heart of Antrim's enterprise, the thing that allows him to make credible his wild surmises, is his keen insight into social and marital relations and his masterful linguistic skills. Antrim sketches his characters—Rotarians, tennis buffs, suburban moms, wayward teens—with indelible lines. They speak a perfectly rendered American argot. They go about their lives doing all the things comfortably domesticized Americans do. They attend potluck suppers, ogle one another's spouses, chauffeur children to appointments, borrow plumber's snakes, all in pursuit of happiness in a place where happiness can no longer exist."
