= Soldiers in Hiding (novel) =

Novel by Richard Wiley

First edition (publ. Atlantic Monthly Press)

Soldiers in Hiding is the first novel by Richard Wiley. It received the 1987 PEN/Faulkner Award for Fiction It begins in Tokyo in 1941, when Teddy Maki and Jimmy Yamamoto, two young Japanese-American jazz musicians, are stranded in Japan after the bombing of Pearl Harbor, drafted into the Japanese army and sent to the Philippines, the scene of bloody conflict with guerrillas and American troops. Rather than act as true soldiers, the two young men attempt to disengage themselves from the savagery of a war in which they are unable to choose sides. But such innocence is impossible to maintain. Thirty years later, Teddy Maki, by then a star of Japanese television, is still haunted by Jimmy's death and his own failure to disobey the order of his commanding officer to shoot an American prisoner. The guilt that poisons his relationship with his wife and son and with the country in which he has chosen to live as a perpetual outsider speaks to the moral issues raised by all wars—from Auschwitz to My Lai.
