= Donald Antrim =

American novelist

- Born: 1958 (age 67–68); Sarasota, Florida, U.S.
- Education: Brown University
- Occupation: Professor
- Writing career
- Language: English
- Years active: 1993–present
- Genres: Novels, short stories, memoir
- Notable works: Elect Mr. Robinson for a Better World (1993); The Verificationist (2000)
- Notable awards: MacArthur fellowship
- Movement: Postmodernism

Donald Antrim (born 1958) is an American novelist. His first novel, Elect Mr. Robinson for a Better World, was published in 1993. In 1999, The New Yorker named him as among the 20 best writers under the age of 40. In 2013, he was named a MacArthur Fellow.

== Life ==
Antrim was born in Sarasota, Florida. After graduating from Woodberry Forest School in 1977, Antrim graduated from Brown University, taught prose fiction at the graduate school of New York University, and was the Mary Ellen von der Heyden Fellow for Fiction at the American Academy in Berlin, Germany in Spring 2009. Antrim teaches in the MFA program at Columbia University and lives in Brooklyn.

Antrim is a frequent contributor of fiction to The New Yorker and has written two other critically acclaimed novels, The Verificationist and The Hundred Brothers, the latter of which was a finalist for the 1998 PEN/Faulkner Award in fiction.

He is also the author of The Afterlife, a 2006 memoir about his mother, Louanne Self. He has received grants and awards from the John Simon Guggenheim Memorial Foundation, the National Endowment for the Arts, and the Dorothy and Lewis B. Cullman Center for Scholars and Writers at the New York Public Library. In 2013, he received a fellowship from the MacArthur Foundation.

=== Family ===
Antrim is the brother of artist Terry Leness and the son of Harry Antrim, a scholar of T. S. Eliot.

== Bibliography ==
=== Novels ===
- Elect Mr. Robinson for a Better World (1993, ISBN 0-375-72503-2)
- The Hundred Brothers (1998, ISBN 0-517-70310-6)
- The Verificationist (2000, ISBN 0-679-76943-9)

=== Short fiction ===
Collections

- The Emerald Light in the Air : Stories (New York: Farrar, Straus and Giroux, 2014.) Collects seven stories originally published in the New Yorker between 1999 and 2014.

Stories

- "An Actor Prepares" (New Yorker, June 21, 1999)
- "Pond, with Mud" (New Yorker, October 20, 2003)
- "Solace" (New Yorker, April 4, 2005)
- "Another Manhattan" (New Yorker, December 22, 2008)
- "He Knew" (New Yorker, May 9, 2011)
- "Ever Since" (New Yorker, March 12, 2012)
- "The Emerald Light in the Air" (New Yorker, February 3, 2014)

Stories excerpted from novels

- "Y Chromosome" (New Yorker, November 18, 1996) (from The Hundred Brothers)
- "The Pancake Supper" (New Yorker, December 7, 1999) (from The Verificationist)

=== Non-fiction ===
Books

- The Afterlife: A Memoir (2006, ISBN 0-312-42635-6)
- One Friday in April: A Story of Suicide and Survival (2021, ISBN 978-1324005568)

Essays and reporting

- Black Mountain 1977
- I Bought A Bed
- A.K.A. Sam
- Ad Nauseam
- Church
- The Kimono
- A Man in the Kitchen
- Fed
- The Unprotected Life
- Everywhere and Nowhere: A Journey Through Suicide

== See also ==
- Postmodern literature
- Hysterical realism
