= Seaview (novel) =

Novel by Toby Olson

First edition (publ. New Directions)

Seaview is a novel by Toby Olson. It received the 1983 PEN/Faulkner Award for Fiction.

The book centers around a woman called Melinda who is dying of cancer and her husband, Allen who agrees to help out a drug dealer in return for medicine. He instead decides to make money by hustling players on the golf courses they pass while on their way to Cape God where Melinda was born.
