= Maureen Howard =

American writer and editor (1930–2022)

- Born: Maureen Theresa Kearns; June 28, 1930; Bridgeport, Connecticut, U.S.
- Died: March 13, 2022 (aged 91); Manhattan, New York, U.S.
- Education: Smith College
- Occupations: Author; professor
- Spouses: Daniel F. Howard (m. 1954; div. 1967); David J. Gordon (m. 1968, divorced); Mark Probst (m. 1981; died 2018)
- Children: 1
- Writing career
- Period: 1960–2022
- Genres: Fiction, memoir
- Notable awards: National Book Critics Circle Award (1978)

Maureen Theresa Howard (née Kearns; June 28, 1930 – March 13, 2022) was an American novelist, memoirist, and editor. Her award-winning novels feature women protagonists and are known for formal innovation and a focus on the Irish-American experience.

A native of Bridgeport, Connecticut, she was educated at Smith College. In addition to her work as an author, she had a career in academia, teaching writing and literature at several institutions, including Yale University and Columbia University.

Howard's books explore the role of family, class, the way that history informs personal identity, the experience of women in American society, and Catholicism in the lives of Irish Americans. Among other awards, her work garnered the National Book Critics Circle Award and three nominations for the PEN/Faulkner Award for Fiction.

== Biography ==
=== Early life ===
Howard was born in Bridgeport, Connecticut, on June 28, 1930. Her father, William L. Kearns, was an Irish immigrant who worked as a detective in Fairfield County, where he was assigned to the Harold Israel case. Her mother, Loretta (née Burns), was a homemaker and the daughter of an Irish immigrant who amassed a fortune from land development and owning an asphalt plant. Howard credited her mother with exposing her to fine arts, enrolling her in lessons for ballet, piano, and elocution, in contrast to the experience with her father. Because of the family's economic situation, Howard went to work in the local public library at age sixteen.

=== Education and marriage ===
Howard attended Smith College, graduating in 1952. Howard was often critical of her education at Smith, which was at that time still very much delivering a genteel and sanitized education for women, but she continued to be connected to her alma mater. After graduation, she worked in advertising and then married Daniel F. Howard in 1954. He was a professor of English at Williams College and Kenyon College before joining Rutgers University in 1960, where he eventually chaired the English department. The couple had one child, a daughter. Howard's first marriage ended in divorce in 1967 and she married David J. Gordon the following year. Like Howard's first husband, Gordon was a college professor. Her marriage to David J. Gordon ended in divorce. In 1981, she married lawyer, stockbroker, and fellow novelist Mark Probst. He died in 2018.

=== Career ===
In 1960, Howard published her first novel, Not a Word About Nightingales, which drew on her familiarity with academia to tell the story of a professor who decides to abandon family, job, and country while on sabbatical in Italy. The novel, first published in the United Kingdom before an American edition appeared in 1962, did not attract a large readership, but it impressed critics. In The New York Times, Martin Levin called it "delicious" and "cool". In later years, notable critics expressed admiration for it. Among these were Doris Grumbach, the literary editor of The New Republic, who said the novel "convinced through the originality of its parts … the writing, the creation of memorable characters". Celebrating it in The New York Times in 1982, Anatole Broyard said it was "pleasingly full of life and fine details".

Howard's second novel, Bridgeport Bus, appeared in 1965. Structured as a series of journal entries, it tells the story of an Irish-American woman who escapes her hometown of Bridgeport for New York City, where she pursues an independent life. Kirkus Reviews praised it as "filled with abrasive, abusive insights and observations and a wicked humor". Writing in The New York Times, Levin praised Howard's "blend of wit, impeccable style, and humanity". Like her first novel, it did not attract a large readership, but over time critics came to hold it in high regard. Remarking on it in The Washington Post in 1982, Grumbach called it "one of the most astutely funny novels of our time", while, a decade later, the scholar and critic Noel Perrin said it was "stunningly good". In 2001, the critic John Leonard lamented that it had been "published a couple of years too early" to benefit from the attention paid to second-wave feminism, despite being a "feminist novel".

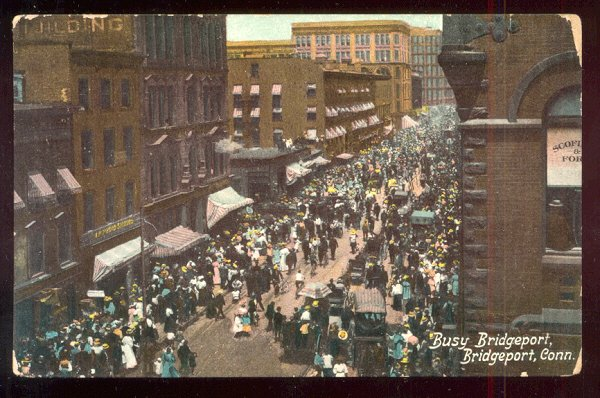
1910 postcard image of Bridgeport, Howard's hometown and an important location in her writing

During the late 1960s Howard began her teaching career. Continuing into the 1970s she taught literature, drama, and creative writing at, among others, The New School for Social Research; University of California, Santa Barbara, and City University of New York.

In 1974, Howard's third novel, Before My Time, was published to critical acclaim. Writing in The New York Times, Grumbach called Howard an "extraordinarily talented writer" and the novel a "further display of her sane, evocative, simple, and exact prose". Kirkus Reviews wrote that it was "a real book…written with both intelligence and feeling". She followed it in 1977 with a book on American women writers that she edited. The critic Gary Davenport said her introduction to that book "is the most intelligent treatment of women's literature that I have seen or expect ever to see".

Howard's next book was a memoir, Facts of Life (1978), which some scholars have regarded as among her best work. Rather than tell her life story chronologically, it is organized into sections by theme. Initial reviews of the book were mostly positive. The novelist Diane Johnson, writing in The New York Times, praised the "excellence" of the writing, even as she wished the book had more "narrative coherence". Writing in The Hudson Review, Davenport thought the book "strangely uneven" but "highly effective". Kirkus Reviews called the book "a successful search for form and a flawless skewering of personality in glistening language". In The New Republic, Alfred Kazin praised it as "a ruthlessly personal story" told with "sheer novelistic skill". The book went on to win a National Book Critics Circle Award in 1978.

During this period, Howard lectured at Brooklyn College as well as The New School for Social Research.

In Publishers Weekly, Sybil Steinberg speculated that Howard's next novel, Grace Abounding (1982), could be her "breakthrough book", but the novel received mixed reviews. While Ada Long, writing in The New York Review of Books, praised it as "gentler and more convincing" than Howard's previous work, Broyard dismissed it in The New York Times as a "baffling" near failure. Kirkus Reviews also criticized it as "another family-life mosaic that doesn't quite add up". The novel still received a nomination for the PEN/Faulkner Award for Fiction, as did Howard's next two novels, Expensive Habits (1986) and Natural History (1992). The latter, which takes place in Howard's native Bridgeport, received praise in Publishers Weekly as "a compelling tour de force" that "places Howard squarely among the outstanding practitioners of late 20th-century fiction". The author John Casey, writing in The New York Times, compared reading Natural History to "watching a display of the Aurora Borealis." Irving Malin, in Commonweal, admired the "brilliant" novel's "maze of meaning".

Howard joined the faculty of the School of the Arts at Columbia University in 1993. She had previously been an instructor at Columbia's School of General Studies in the 1980s. She then began to write a quartet of books inspired by the four seasons: A Lover's Almanac (1998), The Silver Screen (2004), and The Rags of Time (2009), and the collection of novellas called Big as Life: Three Tales for Spring (2001). In 2010, reflecting on all of the books as a "great sequence-novel in four parts", the critic Sophia Lear, writing in The New Republic, praised them as "a beautifully integrated whole" whose "real subject" is "the artistic endeavor itself". Other reviews were mixed. Writing in The New York Review of Books, Caroline Fraser criticized the quartet's "almost cartoonish" treatment of its characters, which, she believed, resulted from the books being "radically experimental in form". The New Yorker found The Rags of Time to be lacking in substance, while Publishers Weekly thought some characters in The Silver Screen were under-developed. Reviewing Big as Life in The Atlantic Monthly, Robert Potts argued that "Howard's style can sometimes be too elliptical for its own good", although he still found the book to be full of "subtlety and grace". Reviewing The Rags of Time in The New York Times, the author Jess Row admired Howard's writing ("no one writing in English today produces anything quite like [her sentences]") and the "extremely ambitious" end to her quartet.

== Personal life ==
Howard's brother, George Kearns (d. 2010), was a professor of literature who authored two books on Ezra Pound; he was Professor Emeritus at Rutgers University. Howard's daughter, Loretta Howard, owns an art gallery in New York City. Howard died in Manhattan on March 13, 2022, at the age of 91.

== Selected bibliography ==
=== Novels ===
- Not a Word About Nightingales. Secker & Warburg, 1960.
- Bridgeport Bus. Harcourt, Brace & World, 1965.
- Before My Time. Little, Brown & Co., 1974. ISBN 978-0-316-37468-2
- Grace Abounding. Little, Brown & Co., 1982. ISBN 978-0-316-37462-0
- Expensive Habits. Summit Books, 1986. ISBN 978-0-671-50625-4
- Natural History. W.W. Norton & Co., 1992. ISBN 978-0-393-03405-9
- A Lover’s Almanac. Viking, 1998. ISBN 978-0-670-87597-9
- The Silver Screen. Viking, 2004. ISBN 978-0-670-03358-4
- The Rags of Time. Viking, 2009. ISBN 978-0-670-02132-1

=== Story collection ===
- Big as Life: Three Tales for Spring. Viking, 2001. ISBN 978-0-670-89978-4

=== Nonfiction ===
- Facts of Life. Little, Brown & Co., 1978. ISBN 978-0-316-37469-9

=== Edited volumes ===
- Seven American Women Writers of the Twentieth Century: An Introduction. University of Minnesota Press, 1977. ISBN 978-0-8166-0796-9
- The Penguin Book of Contemporary American Essays. Viking, 1985. ISBN 978-0-14-006618-0
- Edith Wharton: Collected Stories 1891-1910. Library of America, 2001. ISBN 978-1-883011-93-2
- Edith Wharton: Collected Stories 1911-1937. Library of America, 2001. ISBN 978-1-883011-94-9

== Work ==
Howard's work has been the subject of academic study. Her papers, including manuscripts, correspondence, and other materials, are housed at the Rare Book and Manuscript Library at Columbia University.

=== Form ===
Howard's body of work spans fiction and nonfiction, including short stories, autobiography, essays, and book reviews, but novels comprise the majority of her literary output. Her books have often been called experimental, since they rely on literary techniques such as shifting perspectives and nonlinear narration. The scholar Patricia Keefe Durso has called Howard's narrative style "unconventional and challenging". The critic Richard Eder summarized her fiction as "a chronological whirligig, with events as likely to be told after their consequences as before and sometimes simultaneously", her stories are "mixed up for a reader to assemble". The scholar David Madden notes that Howard's works "abound in various, competing voices with multiple first-person narrators, including the author herself". For the scholar Charles Fanning, Howard's approach to literary form demonstrates her belief that "experience is too tricky and fascinating, too full, for straightforward narrative. Life means too much, not too little, to be rendered in logical, linear form".

Critics have noted that Howard's novels tend to minimize plot, focusing instead on an attempt to capture characters and "an accumulation of moments", or what Keefe Durso has termed "landscapes of memory". Toward that end, her prose has been noted for its lyricism and ironic tone, "at once earthy and sophisticated", leading Madden to describe her as "an elegant stylist".

=== Themes ===
Scholars and critics have tended to focus on Howard's concern with the Irish-American experience and its related themes of identity, family, history, and religion. Keefe Durso argues that these themes "are all present to one degree or another in Howard's work, but religion and family dominate her thematic landscape". She explains that Irish Catholic culture forms the setting in which Howard's dramas play out, and even when Howard's characters break from Catholicism they do so by making new religions out of secular pursuits. The scholar Sally Barr Ebest has noted that, in this, Howard's work has much in common with the novels of other Irish-American women writers, which are immersed in Catholic culture.

Howard was also particularly concerned with identity. The scholar Kerry Ahearn notes that "the search for identity is her constant theme". For the scholar George O'Brien, Howard's work shows how a reckoning with ethnic and family history is essential to understanding personal identity, which otherwise succumbs to "shapelessness" if "conceived…without an adequate negotiation of [ethnic] origins". Keefe Durso echoes this notion, stating that Howard's work demonstrates that when "the past is honestly examined and historical truths are confronted…growth will be possible". In this way, Howard's work explores how the past is integral to the formation of the self.

Another of Howard's major thematic concerns was the experience of women. Most of her novels feature female protagonists, whom Grumbach identifies as "caught in the world of men", although she argues that Howard's work portrays men as equally lost and sympathetic. Perrin, too, points out that, rather than depicting antagonism between genders, Howard "has been consistently concerned with how women deal with their families, and especially their mothers". In many of her novels, she portrayed women balancing both personal and work relationships, or attempting to create art while acknowledging that art is frequently “shaped by the interventions” of others.

=== Influences ===
Howard wrote of her admiration for numerous writers, including Virginia Woolf, Edith Wharton, and Flannery O'Connor. Critics have also identified Henry James as an influence on her work.

== Honors ==
Howard won numerous honors for her work. Below are honors she received for both her body of work and individual works.

=== Honors for body of work ===
- Guggenheim Fellowship for Creative Arts (1967)
- Bunting Fellowship of the Harvard Radcliffe Institute (1967)
- Honorary doctorate, University of Bridgeport (1985)
- National Endowment for the Arts Fellowship (1988)
- Ingram Merrill Foundation Fellowship (1988)
- Library Lion honoree, New York Public Library (1993)
- Award in Literature, American Academy of Arts and Letters (1997)
- American Academy of Arts and Sciences, Elected Member (1998)
- Dorothy and Lewis B. Cullman Center Fellowship of the New York Public Library (2003)
- John Dos Passos Prize for Literature (2004)
- Honorary doctorate, Sacred Heart University (2006)
- Katherine Anne Porter Award of the American Academy of Arts and Letters (2012)

=== Honors for individual works ===
- O. Henry Award for "Bridgeport Bus", originally published in The Hudson Review (1962)
- O. Henry Award for "Sherry", originally published in The Hudson Review (1966)
- National Book Critics Circle Award for Facts of Life (1978)

In addition, Facts of Life was a finalist for the National Book Award, and Grace Abounding, Expensive Habits, and Natural History were all finalists for the PEN/Faulkner Award for Fiction.

Howard's work has been anthologized in Modern Irish American Fiction: A Reader and Cabbage and Bones: An Anthology of Irish American Women's Fiction. She was an invited speaker at numerous institutions, including Rutgers University.
