= Joan Silber =

American novelist and short story writer

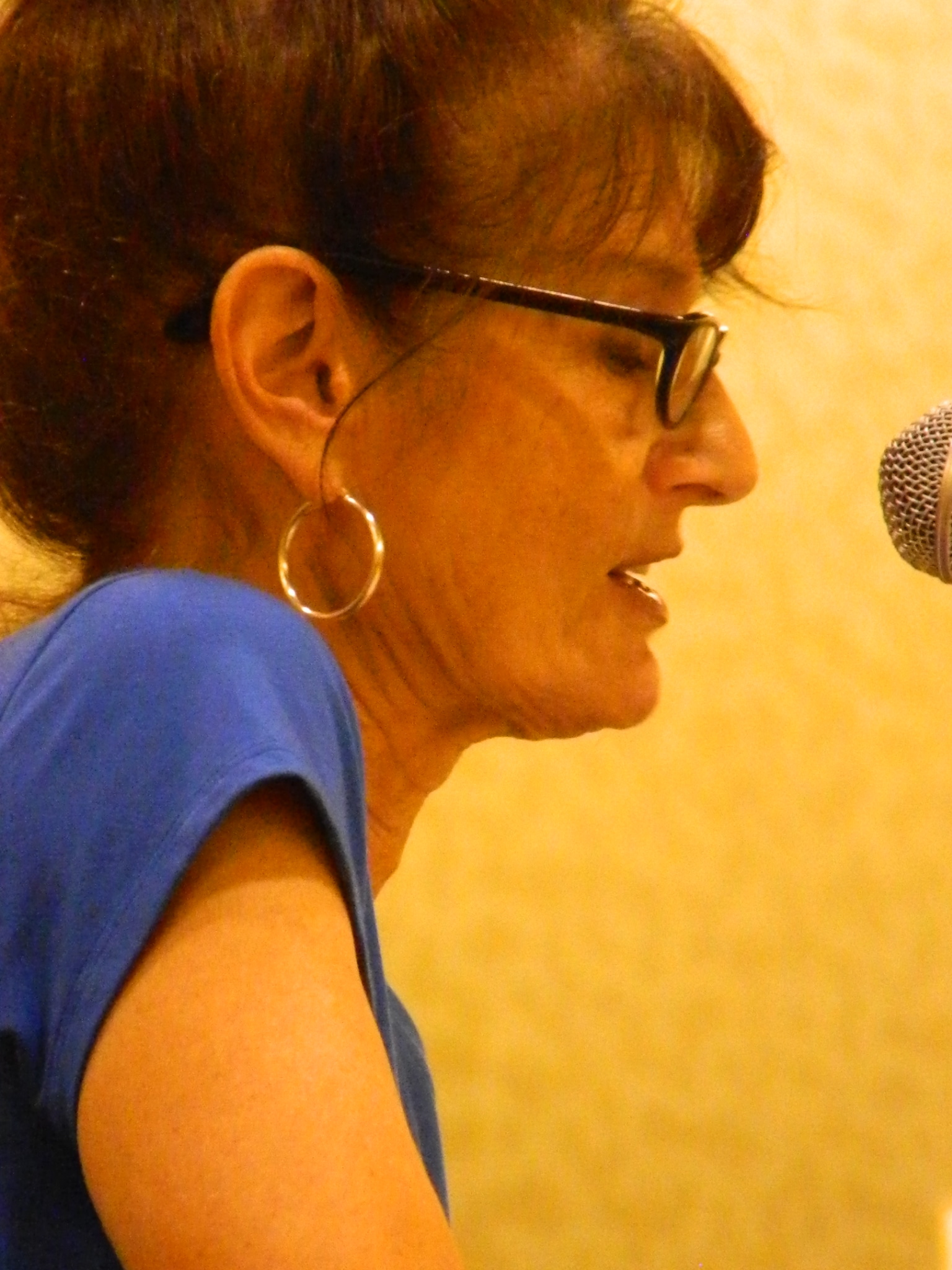
- Joan Silber visiting Barnes & Noble for New York book signing.

Joan Silber (born 1945) is an American novelist and short story writer. She won the 2017 National Book Critics Circle Award in Fiction and the 2018 PEN/Faulkner Award for Fiction for her novel Improvement.

== Biography ==
Joan Silber was born in 1945. She grew up in Millburn, New Jersey. She graduated from Sarah Lawrence College and obtained an M.A. from New York University. She taught at NYU and now teaches at Sarah Lawrence College and lives in New York City.

Silber's work has been selected for The O. Henry Prize Stories six times—in 2003, 2004, 2007, 2013, 2015, and 2021. It also appeared in the Best American Short Stories 2015, and won The Pushcart Prize. Her writing has appeared in The New Yorker, Ploughshares, The Paris Review, Tin House, Epoch, The Southern Review, Agni, The Colorado Review, and other publications.

== Bibliography ==
=== Novels ===
- Mercy (2025)
- Secrets of Happiness (2021)
- Improvement (2017)
- The Size of the World (W.W. Norton, 2008)
- Lucky Us (Algonquin Books of Chapel Hill, 2001)
- In the City (Viking, 1987)
- Household Words (Penguin Books, 1980)

=== Short fiction ===
Collections

- Fools (W.W. Norton, 2013)
- Ideas of Heaven: A Ring of Stories (W.W. Norton, 2004)
- In My Other Life (Sarabande Books, 2000)

=== Nonfiction ===
- The Art of Time in Fiction: As Long as It Takes (Graywolf Press, 2009)

== Honors and awards ==
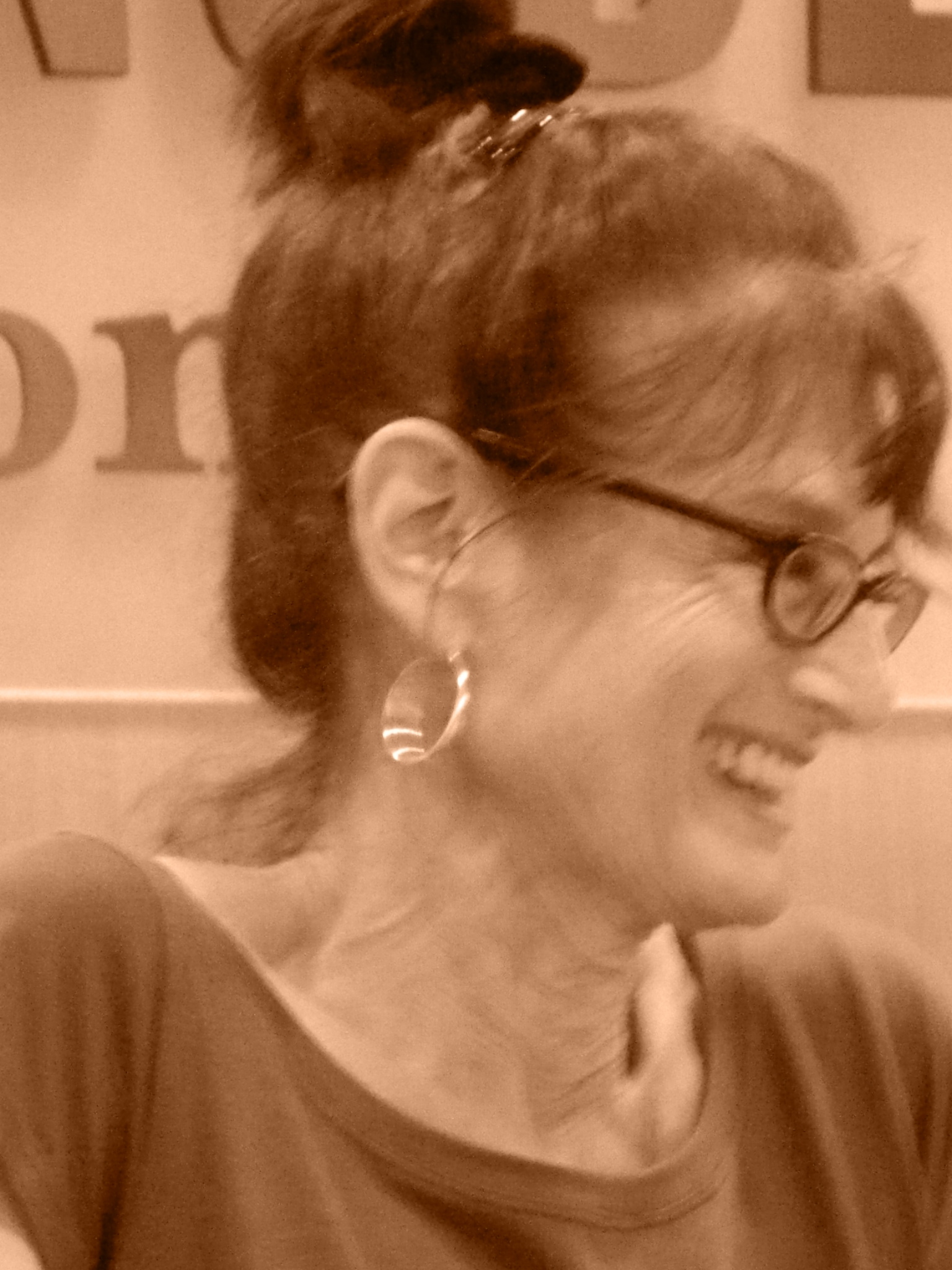
Joan Silber sharing a moment with audience at New York book signing, June 27, 2013, Barnes & Noble.

- 2018 PEN/Faulkner Award for Improvement
- 2018 PEN/Malamud Award for Excellence in the Short Story
- 2017 National Book Critics Circle Award in Fiction winner for Improvement
- 2014 PEN/Faulkner Award, finalist for Fools
- 2008 The Los Angeles Times Book Prize, finalist for The Size of the World
- 2004 Story Prize, finalist for Ideas of Heaven
- 2004 National Book Award, finalist for Ideas of Heaven
- 1981 Hemingway Foundation/PEN Award winner for Household Words

She has received grants from the Guggenheim Foundation, the National Endowment for the Arts and the New York Foundation for the Arts.
