= The Night in Question: Stories =

1996 short story collection by Tobias Wolff

The NIght in Question: Stories
- Author: Tobias Wolff
- Publisher: Alfred A. Knopf
- Publication date: 1996
- Media type: print (hardback)
- Pages: 206
- ISBN: 978-0679781554

The Night in Question: Stories is a collection of short fiction by Tobias Wolff first published in 1996 by Alfred A. Knopf. The volume appeared in paperback in 1997, published by Vintage Classics.

== Stories ==
Periodical and original publishing dates are provided for selected stories.

- "Mortals" in Listening to Ourselves: More Stories from the Sound of Writing, Doubleday & Co. (1994)
- "Casualty"
- "Powder" in Fish Stories, 1996 and in The Best American Short Stories 1997
- "The Life of the Body" in Triquarterly 83, 1991–1992
- "Flyboys" in Double Take, Issue #5, Summer 1996
- "Sanity" The Atlantic, December 1990 (link to article in Atlantic)
- "The Other Miller" in The Atlantic, June, 1986, Alaska Quarterly Review, Fall/Winter 1990
- "Two Boys and a Girl" Antaeus, 1994/1995
- "Migrane" Antaeus, 1990
- "The Chain" (also titled "Brian Gold"), Esquire, July 1996
- "Smorgasbord" Esquire, Summer 1987
- "Lady's Dream" Harper's Magazine, December 1992
- "The Night in Question" (also entitled "Francis and Frank"), The New Yorker, April 15, 1996
- "Firelight" Story, Autumn 1991
- "Bullet in the Brain "(also entitled "Anders"), The New Yorker, September 25, 1995

== Background ==
The book was first tentatively titled No Place Like Home.

== Reception ==
Kirkus Reviews calls the collection "surprisingly uneven" but nevertheless is impressed with the stories: "Understatement, irony, and surprising juxtapositions are the key ingredients of these generally accomplished and resonant fictions—the best of which are certainly among the most accomplished being written in our time."

== Theme ==
"The stories in The Night in Question display Wolff's command of dialogue, expressive detail, and meticulous plotting. The plots frequently turn on situational irony, and the endings show the principal characters suffering unexpectedly because of their behavior. That behavior devolves from self-delusion. The disparity between characters' intentions and the consequences of their actions creates conflict that at times skirts the bizarre but is moving and provocative in the end."—Nasrullah Mambrol, "Analysis of Tobias Wolff's Stories", June 26, 2020.

The thematic elements in the collection are developed through stories of childhood or adolescence—only one concerns war. The narratives are crafted through "the spirit Wolff gives them, not the design he arranges for them." New York Times critic Christopher Lehmann-Haupt notes the moral ambiguities that characterize the narratives.

In some of the new stories, the viewpoint seems almost old-fashioned in its morality and its concern for the "great wrongs"…the endings of several other stories shoot off on odd tangents, as if Mr. Wolff were trying to show that often enough issues of right and wrong are slippery."

Literary critic Sandy English, writing in World Socialist Web Site emphasizes the absence of misanthropy in Wolff's assessment of contemporary America.

Wolff's strength lies in his ability to locate optimism and kindness in a generally over-stressed and false America, without dismissing or hiding people's shortcomings…one encounters a sense of poverty, deprivation, and estrangement dominating life, but he dives a little deeper, and we find that the situation is seldom simply grim. His people often surprise us.

== Sources ==
- Eder, Richard. 1996. The Child Is the Father of the Man: THE NIGHT IN QUESTION: Stories. Los Angeles Times, October 13, 1996.https://www.latimes.com/archives/la-xpm-1996-10-13-bk-53233-story.html Accessed November 15, 2026
- English, Sandy. 2010. "A sense of unease: Tobias Wolff's recent fiction collected in Our Story Begins." World Socialist Web Site, August 10, 2010.https://www.wsws.org/en/articles/2010/08/wolf-a10.html Accessed 23 October 2026.
- Hannah, James. 1981. Tobias Wolff: A Study of the Short Fiction. Twayne Publishers, New York. Simon & Schuster Macmillan. ISBN 0-8057-0864-2
- Lehmann-Haupt, Christopher. 1996. "Seizing the Imagination With Moral Questions." New York Times, October 3, 1996. https://www.nytimes.com/1996/10/03/books/seizing-the-imagination-with-moral-questions.html Accessed 18 November 2026.
- Mambrol, Nasrullah. 2020. "Analysis of Tobias Wolff's Stories." Literary Theory and Criticism. June 26, 2020. https://literariness.org/2020/06/26/analysis-of-tobias-wolffs-stories/ Accessed 15 November 2026.
- Wolff, Tobias. 1996. The Night in Question: Stories. Alfred A. Knopf, New York. ISBN 978-0679781554 (hardback).
