= In the Garden of the North American Martyrs =

Collection of short fiction by Tobias Wolff

- Author: Tobias Wolff
- Publisher: Ecco Press
- Publication date: 1981
- Media type: print (hardback)
- Pages: 175
- ISBN: 978-0-880-01497-7

In the Garden of the North American Martyrs is a collection of short fiction by Tobias Wolff first published in 1981 by Ecco Press, New York. The English edition published by Jonathan Cape, London in 1982 is entitled Hunters in the Snow. The collection was awarded the St. Lawrence Award for fiction.

== Stories ==
Date and periodical of original publication indicated for selected stories:

- ”Next Door” Antaeus, 1982
- “Hunters in the Snow” Triquarterly, Issue #48 “Western Stories” Spring 1980
- ”An Episode in the Life of Professor Brooke”
- ”Smokers” The Atlantic Monthly, December 1976.
- ”Face to Face” MAdemoiselle, April 1980
- ”Passenger” Triquarterly no. 51, 1981
- Maiden Voyage” Vogue, March 1978
- Worldly Goods”
- Wingfield” Encounter, 1981
- “In the Garden of the North American Martyrs” Antaeus Issue #37, Spring 1980
- ”Poaching” Willow Springs
- ”The Liar” Atlantic Monthly, February 1980.

== Background ==
Wolff reports that the volume’s title story was taken from a line of verse by New England poet Roger Weingarten in his book of poems entitled Ethan Benjamin Bolt (1975). There is a Roman Catholic parish in Marshfield, Vermont called The Church of the North American Martyrs. Hannah, 1996 p. 3, p. 119.</ref> Woodruff, 1993 p. 22-40</ref> On the genesis of the story Wolff remarked:

I was reading Parkman’s wonderful book, The Jesuits in North America (1867) and I was riveted by his description of the martyrdom of Brébeuf and Lalement. I dreamt about it for a couple of nights. It exerted itself on the story I was writing in a strange way, because it helped me to see that much of what the story was about had to do with power. It illuminated that for me.

== Reception ==
New York Times critic Anatole Broyard registers conditional approval of the collection and credits Wolff for attempting “something difficult, subtle and technically ambitious.” The stories that create in the reader “subtle dislocations” Broyard admires, but regrets that “some of the stories…are not very ambitious, and these are not very good.”

New York Times assistant editor Le Anne Schreiber praises the collection, calling Wolff's writing both “acute” and “refined.”

Tobias Wolff avoids the emotional and stylistic monotone that constricts so many collections of contemporary short stories. His range, sometimes within the same story, extends from fastidious realism to the grotesque and the lyrical.

== Narrative realism and theme ==
“It seems to me the final symptom of despair is silence, and that storytelling is one of sustaining arts; it’s one of affirming arts. It’s one of the most intimate things that people do together…A writer may have a certain pessimism in his outlook, but the very act of being a writer seems to me to be an optimistic act.”—Tobias Wolff in a 1986 interview with Jean W. Ross.

In the Garden of the North American Martyrs is representative of Wolff's early work, notable in that he avoids “postmodern experimentalism” and demonstrates his commitment to the “modern realistic tradition” in short fiction. Wolff wrote in 1994: “In the sixties we began to see a different kind of story here, resolutely unrealistic, scholastic, self-conscious—postmodern (italics)—concerned with exploring its own fictional nature and indifferent if not hostile to the short stories traditional interests in character and dramatic development and social context.” Biographer James Hannah includes John Barth, Donald Barthelme, Robert Coover, and Thomas Pynchon among the major postmodernists writers.

The Martyrs represent Wolff's modern literary realism in which he focuses on “the human concerns of characters within believable, realistic settings," an approach developed by Russian writer Anton Chekov Wolff's contemporaries who write in the modernist mode include Andre Dubus, Joyce Carol Oates, Raymond Carver, and Jayne Anne Phillips. Literary critic Brina Caplan ranks Wolff among “the most convincing defenders of storytelling as an interpretive art…whose careful representation of detail implies that words mirror reality.”

World Socialist Web Site critic Sandy English identifies Wolff's themes as part of a Post-war phenomenon, in which “American literature emerged that looked more closely at the lives of working-class and middle-class families, often when they were the most vulnerable or dysfunctional.”

== Sources ==
- Broyard, Anatole. 1981. BOOS OF THE TIMES. New York Times, Nov. 25, 1981. https://www.nytimes.com/1981/11/25/books/books-of-the-times-106772.html Accessed 3 November 2026.
- Caplan, Brina. 1982. “Particular Truth (excerpts).” The Nation, February 6, 1982 in Tobias Wolff: A Study of the Short Fiction. Twayne Publishers, New York. pp. 155–158. Simon & Schuster Macmillan. Gordon Weaver, editor. ISBN 0-8057-0864-2
- English, Sandy. 2010. “A sense of unease: Tobias Wolff’s recent fiction collected in Our Story Begins.” World Socialist Web Site, August 10, 2010.https://www.wsws.org/en/articles/2010/08/wolf-a10.html Accessed 23 October 2026.
- Hannah, James. 1981. Tobias Wolff: A Study of the Short Fiction. Twayne Publishers, New York. Simon & Schuster Macmillan. Gordon Weaver, editor. ISBN 0-8057-0864-2
- Parkman, Francis. 1867. The Jesuits in North America in the Seventeenth Century. Part 2. Project Gutenberg eBook. https://www.gutenberg.org/files/6933/6933-h/6933-h.htm#Chapter_281649. Accessed 3 November 2026.
- Schreiber, Le Anne. 1981. “CONTROLLED FICTION AND RECKLESS ENDINGS” New York Times, November 15, 1981. https://www.nytimes.com/1981/11/15/books/controlled-fiction-and-reckless-endings.html Accessed 22 October 2026.
- Tayler, Christopher. 2008. “Soldiering on.” The Guardian, August 1, 2008. https://www.theguardian.com/books/2008/aug/02/fiction Accessed 23 October 2026.
- Wolff, Tobias. 1981. In the Garden of the North American Martyrs. Publisher. The Ecco Press ISBN 978-0-880-01497-7
- Wolff, Tobias. 1993. A Piece of Work: Five Writers Discuss Their Revisions. Jay Woodruff, editor. University of Iowa Press. ISBN 978-0-87745-409-0
- Wolff, Tobias. 1994. Introduction to The Vintage Book of Contemporary American Short Stories. Random House, New York. p. xiii ISBN 978-0679745136
- Woodruff, Jay. 1993. “Interview with Tobias Wolff” in A Piece of Work: Five Writers Discuss Their Revisions. Jay Woodruff, editor. pp. 22–40. University of Iowa Press. ISBN 978-0-87745-409-0
