= In Pharaoh's Army =

1994 book by Tobias Wolff

- First edition cover
- Author: Tobias Wolff
- Language: English
- Genre: Memoir
- Publisher: Knopf
- Publication date: October 4, 1994
- Publication place: United States

In Pharaoh's Army: Memories of the Lost War is the second memoir by American writer Tobias Wolff, published on October 4, 1994.

The book chronicles the author's experiences as a US Army officer in the Vietnam War. Before beginning his year tour of duty proper in Vietnam, Wolff spent a year in Washington, D.C. learning the Vietnamese language; prior to that he had been trained as a paratrooper with Special Forces. Wolff was stationed with South Vietnamese Army soldiers near Mỹ Tho and he was present during the Communists' Tet Offensive. The memoir includes a recollection of that battle as well as vignettes of various personal experiences, both in and out of Vietnam.

The book picks up more or less where Wolff's first memoir, This Boy's Life: A Memoir, leaves off. It was a National Book Award finalist for non-fiction.

== Reception ==
The New York Times noted limitations of Wolff's characteristic style, finding that it may be too limited for a war memoir, however precise and evocative his writing. The reviewer describes Wolff's writing about his year in Vietnam as "an elegant gallery of small sketches in which he is almost invariably the central figure..." but praises his conveying "for example, the altered sense of time and space that he and other American servicemen developed in Vietnam."

The Independent noted: "Even under fire, Wolff was self-consciously having an experience, giving himself something to write about one day. And quite a large part of what is only a small book is taken up with memories of the author's father, an ex-convict whose indisciplined life fostered in Wolff the desire for order."

Publishers Weekly noted that Wolff expressed "a sense of futility and growing disillusionment with the war" in his memoir. After being discharged, he was somewhat adrift, but the memoir extends through his four years of study of English literature at Oxford, a period when he committed to writing and "found himself".

Kirkus Reviews called it "an excellent volume" that "evenly weighs the many costs and few gains of coming of age in a war."
