= Rafi Zabor =

American novelist

- Born: Joel Zaborovsky; August 22, 1946 (age 80)
- Education: Brooklyn College
- Occupations: Novelist, music critic
- Writing career
- Notable work: The Bear Comes Home
- Notable awards: PEN/Faulkner Award for Fiction; 1998 The Bear Comes Home

Rafi Zabor (born Joel Zaborovsky, August 22, 1946) is a Brooklyn, New York–based music journalist- and musician-turned-novelist.

== Life and work ==
A graduate of Brooklyn College, Zabor became a jazz critic for Musician in 1977, and later became an editor for the magazine.

He received the 1998 PEN/Faulkner Award for Fiction for his first novel, The Bear Comes Home, which follows an alto saxophonist – who happens to be a bear – in his pursuit of musical perfection.

Zabor's second book, the memoir I, Wabenzi, was commercially unsuccessful and met with mixed critical response.

In 2008, Zabor received an NEA Literature Fellowship.

As of 2011, he was reportedly working on a new novel, to be titled The Bosphorus Dogs.

Zabor is also a jazz drummer.

== Bibliography ==
- The Bear Comes Home (1997)
- I, Wabenzi (2005)
- Street Legal (2022)
