= Our Story Begins: New and Selected Stories =

2008 collection of short stories by Tobias Wolff

- First edition cover
- Author: Tobias Wolff
- Publisher: Knopf
- Publication date: March 28, 2008
- ISBN: 978-1-4000-4459-7

Our Story Begins: New and Selected Stories is a collection of thirty-one short stories by American author Tobias Wolff published in 2008. The collection is divided into two sections: Selected Stories and New Stories. It also contains a brief preface titled "A Note from the Author" in which Wolff defends his decision to edit some of the previously published stories.

== Selected Stories ==
The Selected Stories section contains twenty-one previously published stories. The table of contents in the collection just lists the story titles. Below, these are given as well as the volume in which they were previously published or collected:

From In the Garden of the North American Martyrs:

- "In the Garden of the North American Martyrs"
- "Next Door"
- "Hunters in the Snow"
- "The Liar"

From Back in the World (1985)

- "Soldier's Joy"
- "The Rich Brother"
- "Leviathan"
- "Desert Breakdown"
- "Say Yes"

From The Night in Question (1996):

- "Mortals"
- "Flyboys"
- "Sanity"
- "The Other Miller"
- "Two Boys and a Girl"
- "The Chain"
- "Smorgasbord"
- "Lady's Dream"
- "Powder"
- "The Night in Question"
- "Firelight"
- "Bullet in the Brain"

== New Stories ==
The New Stories section contains ten stories:

- "That Room"
- "Awaiting Orders" (from The New Yorker, July 25, 2005)
- "A White Bible"
- "Her Dog" (from The Walrus, November 2006)
- "A Mature Student"
- "The Deposition" (from The New Yorker, January 29, 2006)
- "Down to Bone"
- "Nightingale" (from The New Yorker, January 6, 1997)
- "The Benefit of the Doubt" (from The New Yorker, July 6, 2003)
- "Deep Kiss"

== Critical reception ==
In "Eyes Wide Open", Liesl Schillinger, writing for the New York Times, said of the collection "In these and other stories about husbands and wives, rich kids and poor kids, military men and working mothers, compromised academics and callous businessmen, all brought by circumstance to some crux of moral reckoning Wolff's voice is unfailingly authentic, while his embrace of the variety of American experience is knowing, forgiving and all-encompassing." The Kirkus Reviews spoke of the "impressive range" of Wolff's subjects which are "distilled into crisp, urgent little dramas." The reviewer identified "Richard Yates, Raymond Carver and Robert Stone" as contemporary writers whose work Wolff's most resembles, saying "Like their best work, his own exhibits classic richness and depth."
