= Geoffrey Wolff =

American novelist and writer (born 1937)

Geoffrey Wolff (born 1937) is an American novelist, essayist, biographer, and travel writer. Among his honors and recognition are the Award in Literature of the American Academy of Arts and Letters (1994) and fellowships of the National Endowment for the Arts, the American Academy in Berlin (2007), and the Guggenheim Foundation. His younger brother Tobias Wolff is also a writer.

== Biography ==
Geoffrey Wolff was born in Hollywood, California, as the first son to Rosemary (née Loftus) and "Duke" Arthur Samuels Wolff. He is the older brother of the novelist and memoirist Tobias Wolff. Their parents separated when Geoffrey was twelve, his brother living with their mother, and Geoffrey with their father; their parents eventually divorced. He has described the adventure of his upbringing with his father on the East Coast in an acclaimed memoir, The Duke of Deception (1979), which was runner-up for the Pulitzer Prize (Tobias has treated with similar candor his own years with their mother in a memoir, This Boy's Life, published in 1989.).

Geoffrey Wolff was educated at the Choate School, graduating in 1955; at Princeton University, graduating summa cum laude in 1960; and at Churchill College, Cambridge. He has taught at Robert College (now Boğaziçi University) in Istanbul, Turkey; at Princeton, and at the University of California, Irvine. There he was professor of English and comparative literature and, from 1995 to 2006, director of the influential Graduate Fiction Program. He has also been a book editor at the Washington Post and at Newsweek.

Wolff is the author of six novels; biographies of Harry Crosby, John O'Hara, and Joshua Slocum; a volume of essays, and other works of non-fiction in several genres. He has edited a selection of Edward Hoagland's writings. He lives in Bath, Maine, with his wife Priscilla.

== Partial bibliography ==
=== Novels ===
- Bad Debts (1969) ISBN 978-0-671-20376-4
- The Sightseer (1974) ISBN 978-0-394-48712-0
- Inklings (1977) ISBN 978-0-394-49349-7
- Providence (1985) ISBN 978-0-670-80461-0
- The Final Club (1990), set at Princeton University (ISBN 978-0394578200)
- The Age of Consent (1995) ISBN 978-0-340-63777-7

=== Non-fiction ===
- The Edge of Maine (2005), a travel portrait ISBN 978-0-7922-3871-3
- The Duke of Deception: Memories of My Father (1979), a memoir ISBN 978-0-340-25469-1
- A Day at the Beach: Recollections (1992), essays ISBN 978-0-679-40333-3

==== Biographies ====
- Black Sun: The Brief Transit and Violent Eclipse of Harry Crosby (1976) ISBN 978-0-394-47450-2
- The Art of Burning Bridges: A Life of John O'Hara (2003) ISBN 978-0-679-42771-1
- The Hard Way Around: The Passages of Joshua Slocum (2010) ISBN 978-1-4000-4342-2

=== As editor ===
- The Edward Hoagland Reader (1979) ISBN 978-0-394-50742-2
