= Paul Gervais (writer) =

American visual artist and writer

Paul Gervais is an American visual artist and writer, who has also published a personal memoir. His novel, Extraordinary People, was nominated for the PEN/ Faulkner Award for Fiction in 1992.

== Early life and studies ==
George Paul Gervais Jr. was born in America in 1946 at Waterville, Maine, to George Paul and Doris Boyd Gervais. His father was born George Paul Beede, in Lowell, Massachusetts, 1908, but adopted the name of his step-father, Gervais, when he was 26 years old. (He was directly descended in the paternal line from Elie de Bédée des Aulnais, born in Britain on the island of Jersey, of a French Protestant family of Anger and Brittany, who had fled France after the repeal of the Edict of Nantes. Elie de Bédée emigrated to New England in America in 1707.)

Gervais attended Saint Michael's College in Vermont, where he earned his B.A. in English Literature in 1969. He also attended San Francisco State University, where he studied poetry with Robert Creeley and Philip Lamantia. In 1980 he earned his Master of Fine Arts from the San Francisco Art Institute.

== Career ==
Gervais worked in advertising and real estate before becoming a full-time writer in 1984. He completed his first novel, Extraordinary People, in 1991; which depicted the lives of two boys growing up in neglectful households. It was a finalist for the PEN/Faulkner Award for Fiction. Gar-an-guli (1999) is a short story in book form about growing up in New England and its American Indigenous heritage.

Gervais met Gil Cohen, his husband, in 1974, and together they have lived in the United States of America at Boston, San Francisco, Point Reyes, California, New York City, and in Italy at Lucca. Their home in Lucca, Villa Massei, which they bought in 1981, has been published in numerous books and magazines for its extraordinary garden, created by its owners, which is visited annually by thousands of garden-lovers from all over the world. Gervais's book, A Garden in Lucca (2000), is a personal memoir recalling the author's journey of self-discovery after buying and caring for the extensive garden in Tuscany, Italy. Un Giardino a Lucca, la storia illustrata (2007) is a large-format, illustrated version of A Garden in Lucca with an abridged text. Other short fiction and articles by Gervais have been published in anthologies and periodicals, including The Los Angeles Times.

Gervais is a member of P.E.N. and the Authors Guild.

== Bibliography ==
- Gervais, Paul (1991). Extraordinary People. New York: HarperCollins. ISBN 0-06-016618-5.
- Gervais, Paul (1999). Gar-an-guli. Hanover NH: Elusium Press. ISBN 1-893450-03-1.
- Gervais, Paul (2000). A Garden in Lucca. New York: Hyperion. ISBN 0-7868-6521-0.
- Gervais, Paul (2007). Un Giardino a Lucca: La storia illustrata. Viareggio: Idea Books. ISBN 88-88033-54-8.
