= The Bear Comes Home =

Novel by Rafi Zabor

- First edition cover
- Author: Rafi Zabor
- Publisher: W. W. Norton
- Publication date: July 21, 1997
- Award: PEN/Faulkner Award (1998)
- ISBN: 0-393-04037-2

The Bear Comes Home is a novel written by American writer Rafi Zabor. It won the 1998 PEN/Faulkner Award for fiction, and was selected as an alternate for the Hemingway Foundation/PEN Award.

== Details ==
The novel tells the story of an alto saxophone-playing bear, his involvement in the jazz subculture, and his pursuit of love, truth and perfection.

Musician published the first chapters of The Bear Comes Home, in serialized form, beginning in 1979. Zabor resumed work on the remainder of the book after a fourteen-year hiatus, and W. W. Norton published the novel in 1997.
