= This Boy's Life: A Memoir =

1989 book by Tobias Wolff

- Cover of This Boy's Life
- Author: Tobias Wolff
- Language: English
- Genre: Memoir
- Set in: American Northwest
- Publisher: The Atlantic Monthly Press
- Publication date: January 1989
- ISBN: 0802136680

This Boy's Life: A Memoir is an autobiographical book by Tobias Wolff about his childhood in the American Northwest in the 1950s, published in January 1989 by The Atlantic Monthly Press. The book was adapted into a film of the same name.

== Background ==
The memoir is about the first two decades of Wolff's life, much of it taking place in the 1950s, focused on ages eleven through sixteen, when Wolff began private school. Wolff describes his early life in the Northwestern United States, including how his mother's behavior and choice in partners taught him "the virtue of rebellion", and how he adapted "in hiding" to overcome his troubles. The book covers Wolff's deeds as a youth: he would "lie, cheat, steal, drink, run away and forge checks."

Reviewers found the depiction of Wolff's childhood and coming-of-age effective. For The New York Times, Joel Conarroe suggested the book offered insight into "how a troubled boy's experiences became a mature artist's material". Charles Solomon of the Los Angeles Times wrote "He was clearly an incorrigible thug as a youth, but his pain is so overwhelming that the reader longs to comfort him rather than discipline him." And Kirkus Reviews found "familiar boyhood rituals" described in a way the reader may not have seen before.

Wolff's writing was praised by multiple reviewers. Publishers Weekly found a "customary skill and self-assurance" in the storytelling. Kirkus Reviews called the memoir "lucid" and "precise". Conarroe described the work as "literate and entertaining". Reviewers and academics have discussed the directness, efficient pace and episodic structure of Wolff's style. Solomon described "vigorous, straightforward prose" without attempt to soften the story. Clifford Thompson of The Threepenny Review highlighted the book's honesty and perceptiveness, also noting the lack of excuses on the author's part. Thompson used the sport of boxing as a metaphor for the writing, suggesting that the sentences "contain the force of punches" and praising an efficiency in stringing together meaningful sentences. Kirkus Reviews described how Wolff sets a dark tone at the start, leading to a series of dark "episodes". Martin Scofield described the structure similarly, highlighting the "short-story-like episodes" that worked together to produce the whole, also finding a sense of immediacy throughout.

The memoir was adapted into a screenplay by Robert Getchell for the 1993 film This Boy's Life, directed by Michael Caton-Jones. Getchell told Patrick Goldstein of the Los Angeles Times that he was "surprised" how the book reminded him of emotions he had experienced in his youth; Goldstein reported that Caton-Jones had felt a similar identification with the material. The book has been used in secondary education; teaching critical reading, Lori Mayo explained in The English Journal how she used a scene in which Wolff described salmon dying after spawning upstream as an example of symbolism or foreshadowing, the scene giving a sense of problems to come.
