= Tobias Wolff =

American author (born 1945)

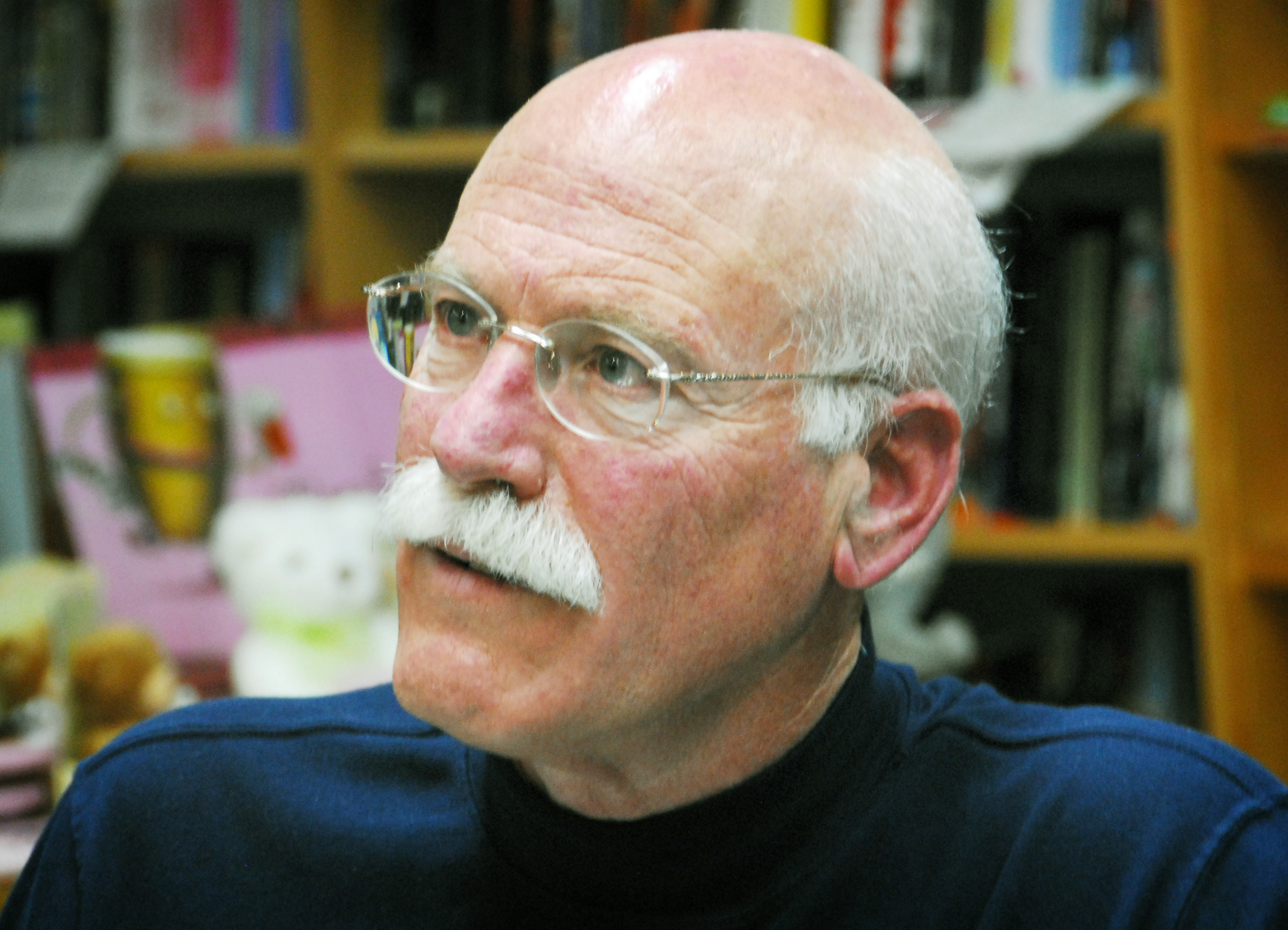
- Wolff in 2008
- Born: Tobias Jonathan Ansell Wolff; June 19, 1945 (age 81); Birmingham, Alabama, U.S.
- Education: Hertford College, Oxford (BA); Stanford University (MA)
- Occupation: Writer
- Spouse: Catherine Dolores Spohn (m. 1975; 3 children)
- Writing career
- Genres: Memoir, short story, novel

Tobias Jonathan Ansell Wolff (born June 19, 1945) is an American short story writer, memoirist, novelist, and teacher of creative writing. He is known for his memoirs, particularly This Boy's Life (1989) and In Pharaoh's Army (1994). He has written four short story collections and two novels including The Barracks Thief (1984), which won the PEN/Faulkner Award for Fiction. Wolff received a National Medal of Arts from President Barack Obama in September 2015.

His academic career began at Syracuse University (1982–1997). Since 1997, he has taught at Stanford University, where he is the Ward W. and Priscilla B. Woods Professor in the School of Humanities and Sciences.

== Life and career ==
Wolff was born in 1945 in Birmingham, Alabama, the second son of Rosemary (Loftus) from Hartford, Connecticut, and Arthur Samuels Wolff, an aeronautical engineer who was a son of a Jewish doctor and his wife. His father had become Episcopalian. Wolff did not learn about his father's Jewish roots until he was an adult. Wolff was raised and identifies as Catholic, like his mother.

His parents separated when Wolff was five and his elder brother Geoffrey was twelve. He lived with his mother in a variety of places, including Seattle and Washington when he was an adolescent. After she remarried, they lived in Newhalem, a small company town in the North Cascade Mountains, where his stepfather, Robert Thompson, worked for Seattle City Light. His father and brother lived on the East Coast during this period. Geoffrey knew nothing about where his brother was until he entered Princeton.

As a child, Wolff had a local paper route and was a Boy Scout. After attending Concrete High School in Concrete, also in the North Cascades, Wolff applied to and was accepted by The Hill School, located 35 miles from Philadelphia, Pennsylvania. He had applied under the self-embellished name "Tobias Jonathan von Ansell-Wolff III", adopting part of one of his father's personas, Saunders Ansell-Wolff 3d. Wolff struggled with the academic load, and he coped through substance abuse and "bec[oming] a school wildman"; during his final year, he was expelled.

Wolff served in the U.S. Army from 1964 to 1968, when he trained for Special Forces, learned Vietnamese, and served as an adviser in Vietnam. He holds a First Class Honours degree in English from Hertford College, Oxford (1972). After returning to the United States, in 1975, he was awarded a Wallace Stegner Fellowship in Creative Writing at Stanford University, where he earned an M.A. and remained as a lecturer for two years.

While continuing to write, Wolff taught at Syracuse University from 1980 to 1997. He published his first short story collection in 1981. At Syracuse he served on the faculty with Raymond Carver and was an instructor in the graduate writing program. Authors who had studied with Wolff as students at Syracuse include Jay McInerney, Tom Perrotta, George Saunders, Alice Sebold, William Tester, Paul Griner, Ken Garcia, Dana C. Kabel, Jan-Marie Spanard, and Paul Watkins.

In 1997, Wolff transferred to Stanford, where he is the Ward W. and Priscilla B. Woods Professor in the School of Humanities and Sciences. He has taught classes in English and creative writing. He also served as the director of the Creative Writing Program at Stanford from 2000 to 2002.

== Writing ==
Wolff is widely known for his work in two genres: the short story and the memoir. His first short story collection, In the Garden of the North American Martyrs, was published in 1981. The collection was well received and several of its stories have since been published in a number of anthologies. Its publication coincided with a period in which several American authors who worked almost exclusively in the short story form were receiving wider recognition. As writers such as Wolff, Raymond Carver and Andre Dubus became better known, the United States was said to be having a renaissance of the short story. (Their 20th-century North American version of realism was often labelled as Dirty realism for its gritty veracity.)

Wolff repudiated this characterization. In 1994, in the introduction to The Vintage Book of Contemporary American Short Stories, he wrote:

To judge from the respectful attention this renaissance has received from reviewers and academics, you would think that it actually happened. It did not. This is a rhetorical flourish to give glamour, even valor, to the succession of one generation by another. The problem with the word "renaissance" is that it needs a dark age to justify itself. I can't think of one, myself... The truth is that the short story form has reliably inspired brilliant performances by our best writers, in a line unbroken since the time of Poe.

Wolff's 1984 novella The Barracks Thief won the PEN/Faulkner Award for Fiction for 1985. Most of the action takes place at Fort Bragg, North Carolina. Three recent paratrooper training graduates are temporarily attached to an airborne infantry company as they await orders to report to Vietnam. Because most of the men in the company fought together in Vietnam, the three newcomers are treated as outsiders and ignored. When money and personal property are discovered missing from the barracks, suspicion falls on the three newcomers. The narrative structure of the book contains several shifts of tone and point of view as the story unfolds.

In 1985, Wolff's second short story collection, Back in the World, was published. Several of the stories in this collection, such as "The Missing Person," are significantly longer than the stories in his first collection.

Wolff chronicled his early life in two memoirs. This Boy's Life (1989), winner of the Los Angeles Times Book Award for Biography, is devoted to the author's adolescence in Seattle and Newhalem, a remote company town in the North Cascade mountains of Washington. The memoir describes the nomadic and uncertain life Wolff and his mother led after his parents divorced. His mother's subsequent marriage to a man who was revealed as an abusive husband and stepfather deeply affected their lives. In Pharaoh's Army (1994) records Wolff's U.S. Army tour of duty in Vietnam.

He published a third collection of stories, The Night in Question, in 1997. His fourth short-story collection, Our Story Begins: New and Selected Stories (2008), includes both new and previously published stories.

Whether he is writing fiction or non-fiction, Wolff's prose is characterized by an exploration of personal/biographical and existential terrain. As Wyatt Mason wrote in the London Review of Books, "Typically, his protagonists face an acute moral dilemma, unable to reconcile what they know to be true with what they feel to be true. Duplicity is their great failing, and Wolff's main theme."

Elsewhere Wolff said of the personal nature of his work: "I have to be able, with a straight face, to tell myself that something is nonfiction if I say it's nonfiction. That's why, although there are autobiographical elements in some of my stories, I still call them fiction because that's what they are. Even though they may have been set into motion by some catalyst of memory."

In 1989, Wolff was chosen as recipient of the Rea Award for the Short Story. Wolff has received the O. Henry Award on three occasions, for the stories "In the Garden of North American Martyrs" (1981), "Next Door" (1982), and "Sister" (1985). In 2008, he was awarded The Story Prize for Our Story Begins.

== Adaptations ==
Some of Wolff's work has been adapted to film. This Boy's Life was adapted as a feature film directed by Michael Caton-Jones in 1993. It starred Leonardo DiCaprio as the teenage Wolff, Robert De Niro as Wolff's abusive step-father Dwight, and Ellen Barkin as Wolff's mother Rosemary.

In 2001, Wolff's acclaimed short story "Bullet in the Brain" (from The Night in Question) was adapted as a short film by David Von Ancken and CJ Follini; it starred Tom Noonan and Dean Winters.

== Family ==
Tobias Wolff's older brother is the author Geoffrey Wolff. A decade before Tobias Wolff published This Boy's Life, his brother wrote a memoir of his own about the boys' biological father, entitled The Duke of Deception (in which he alleges his younger brother was named after the Toby Jug). Wolff's mother later settled in Washington, D.C. and married Francis Fowler Hutchins ll. There she became president of the League of Women Voters.

Tobias Wolff is married and lives with his wife, Catherine Dolores Spohn, and three children in California.

== Awards and honors ==
- 1985 PEN/Faulkner Award for Fiction for The Barracks Thief
- 1989 Whiting Award for Fiction and Nonfiction
- 2006 PEN/Malamud Award (co-winner)
- 2008 The Story Prize
- 2014 Stone Award for Lifetime Literary Achievement, Oregon State University
- 2014 elected to the American Academy of Arts and Letters,
- 2015 National Medal of Arts, US National Endowment for the Arts

== Bibliography ==
=== Novels and Novellas ===
- Ugly Rumors (1984)
- The Barracks Thief (1984)
- Old School (2003)

=== Collections ===
- In the Garden of the North American Martyrs (1981)
- Hunters in the Snow (1982) ISBN 978-0224019866
- Back in the World (1985)
- The Stories of Tobias Wolff (1997) ISBN 9780747531531
- The Night in Question: Stories (1996)
- Our Story Begins: New and Selected Stories (2008)

=== Memoirs ===
- This Boy's Life: A Memoir (1989)
- In Pharaoh's Army (1994)

=== Edited volumes ===
- —— (1983). Matters of Life and Death: New American Stories. ISBN 9780931694172.
- —— (1988). A Doctor's Visit: Short Stories by Anton Chekhov. ISBN 0-553-21322-9.
- —— (1994). The Best American Short Stories.
- —— (1994). The Vintage Book of Contemporary American Short Stories. Knopf Doubleday Publishing. ISBN 9780679745136.

=== Short fiction ===
Year	Title	First published	Reprinted/collected	Notes
1976	Smokers	Wolff, Tobias (December 1976). "Smokers". Atlantic Monthly.	Collected in In the Garden of the North American Martyrs	First published short story.
1988	Fortune	Wolff, Tobias (Summer 1988). "Fortune". Granta. 24 (Inside Intelligence).		
1993	Memorial	Wolff, Tobias (Summer 1993). "Memorial". Granta. 44 (The Last Place on Earth).		
1995	Bullet in the Brian	Wolff, Tobias (September 25, 1995). "Bullet in the Brain". The New Yorker.	Collected in The Night in Question. Reprinted in Sedaris, David, ed. (2005). Children Playing Before a Statue of Hercules. Simon & Schuster. ISBN 0-7432-7612-4.	
2007	Bible	Wolff, Tobias (August 2007). "Bible". The Atlantic.	Collected in Our Story Begins.	
2013	All Ahead of Them	Wolff, Tobias (July 8–15, 2013). "All Ahead of Them". The New Yorker. Vol. 89, no. 20. pp. 74–79.		
