= PEN/Hemingway Award for Debut Novel =

Annual literary award

The PEN/Hemingway Award for Debut Novel is awarded annually to a full-length novel or book of short stories by an American author who has not previously published a full-length book of fiction. The award is named after Ernest Hemingway and funded by the Hemingway family and the Ernest Hemingway Foundation/Society. It is administered by PEN America. Mary Welsh Hemingway, a member of PEN, founded the award in 1976 both to honor the memory of her husband and to recognize distinguished first books of fiction.

The winner is selected by a panel of three distinguished fiction writers and receives a cash prize of US$25,000. Along with the winner, two finalists and two runners-up receive a Ucross Residency Fellowship at the Ucross Foundation, a retreat for artists and writers on a 22,000 acre (89 km²) ranch on the high plains in Ucross, Wyoming. The award ceremony is held at the John F. Kennedy Presidential Library and Museum in Boston, Massachusetts.

The award presentation is sponsored in part by the JFK Presidential Library.

The award is one of many PEN awards sponsored by PEN International affiliates in over 145 PEN centres around the world.

== Winners ==
=== 20th-century ===
Award winners, 1976 to 1999
Year	Author	Title	Ref.
1976	Loyd Little	Parthian Shot	
1977	Renata Adler	Speedboat	
1978	Darcy O'Brien	A Way of Life, Like Any Other	
1979	Reuben Bercovitch	Hasen	
1980	Alan Saperstein	Mom Kills Kids and Self	
1981	Joan Silber	Household Words	
1982	Marilynne Robinson	Housekeeping	
1983	Bobbie Ann Mason	Shiloh and Other Stories	
1984	Joan Chase	During the Reign of the Queen of Persia	
1985	Josephine Humphreys	Dreams of Sleep	
1986	Alan V. Hewat	Lady's Time	
1987	Mary Ward Brown	Tongues of Flame	
1988	Lawrence Thornton	Imagining Argentina	
1989	Jane Hamilton	The Book of Ruth	
1990	Mark Richard	The Ice at the Bottom of the World	
1991	Bernard Cooper	Maps to Anywhere	
1992	Louis Begley	Wartime Lies	
1993	Edward P. Jones	Lost in the City	
1994	Dagoberto Gilb	The Magic of Blood	
1995	Susan Power	The Grass Dancer	
1996	Chang-Rae Lee	Native Speaker	
1997	Ha Jin	Ocean of Words	
1998	Charlotte Bacon	A Private State	
1999	Rosina Lippi	Homestead	

=== 21st-century ===
Award winners, 2000 to present
Year	Author	Title	Result	Ref.
2000	Jhumpa Lahiri	Interpreter of Maladies	Winner	
2001	Akhil Sharma	An Obedient Father	Winner	
2001	Mohsin Hamid	Moth Smoke	Finalist	
2001	Tom Paine	Scar Vegas and other Stories	Finalist	
2001	Myla Goldberg	Bee Season	Runner-Up	
2001	Elissa Schappell	Use Me	Runner-Up	
2002	Justin Cronin	Mary and O’Neil	Winner	
2002	Peter Orner	Esther Stories	Finalist	
2002	Manil Suri	The Death of Vishnu	Finalist	
2002	Carolyn Cooke	The Bostons	Runner-Up	
2002	Micheline Aharonian Marcom	Three Apples Fell From Heaven	Runner-Up	
2003	George Brownstein	The Curious Case of Benjamin Button, Apt. W	Winner	
2003	Christie Hodgen	A Jeweler’s Eye for Flaw	Finalist	
2003	Gabe Hudson	Dear Mr. President	Finalist	
2003	Jonathan Tel	Arafat’s Elephant	Runner-Up	
2003	Julia Whitty	A Tortoise for the Queen of Tonga	Runner-Up	
2004	Jennifer Haigh	Mrs. Kimble	Winner	
2004	Murad Kalam	Night Journey	Finalist	
2004	Z. Z. Packer	Drinking Coffee Elsewhere	Finalist	
2004	Suki Kim	The Interpreters	Runner-Up	
2004	Ellen Ullman	The Bug	Runner-Up	
2005	Chris Abani	GraceLand	Winner	
2005	Samina Ali	Madras on Rainy Days	Finalist	
2005	Laurie Lynn Drummond	Anything You Say Can and Will be Used Against You	Finalist	
2005	Jerome Richard	The Kiss of the Prison Dancer	Runner-Up	
2005	Hannah Tinti	Animal Crackers	Runner-Up	
2006	Yiyun Li	A Thousand Years of Good Prayers	Winner	
2006	Daniel Alarcon	War by Candlelight	Finalist	
2006	Douglas Trevor	The Thin Year in the Fabric of Space	Finalist	
2006	Karen Olsson	Waterloo	Runner-Up	
2006	Jess Row	The Train to Lo Wu	Runner-Up	
2007	Ben Fountain	Brief Encounters With Che Guevara	Winner	
2007	Yvette Christianse	Unconfessed	Finalist	
2007	Rebecca Johns	Icebergs	Finalist	
2007	Janna Levin	A Madman Dreams of Turing Machines	Runner-Up	
2007	Marisha Pessl	The Special Topics in Calamity Physics	Runner-Up	
2008	Joshua Ferris	Then We Came to the End	Winner	
2008	Rebecca Curtis	Twenty Grand	Finalist	
2008	Ravi Howard	Like Trees Walking	Finalist	
2008	Gary Schanbacher	Migration Patterns	Runner-Up	
2008	Margot Singer	The Pale of Settlement	Runner-Up	
2009	Michael Dahlie	A Gentleman's Guide to Graceful Living	Winner	
2009	Sana Krasikov	One More Year	Finalist	
2009	Ed Park	Personal Days	Finalist	
2009	Doug Dorst	Alive in Necropolis	Runner-Up	
2009	Matthew Quick	The Silver Linings Playbook	Runner-Up	
2010	Brigid Pasulka	A Long Long Time Ago and Essentially True	Winner	
2010	C. E. Morgan	All the Living	Finalist	
2010	Abraham Verghese	Cutting for Stone	Finalist	
2010	Mary Beth Keane	The Walking People	Runner-Up	
2010	Lydia Peelle	Reasons for and Advantages of Breathing	Runner-Up	
2011	Brando Skyhorse	The Madonnas of Echo Park	Winner	
2011	Patricia Engel	Vida	Finalist	
2011	Suzanne Rivecca	Death Is Not An Option	Finalist	
2011	Danielle Evans	Before You Suffocate Your Own Fool Self	Honorable mention	
2011	Helen Simonson	Major Pettigrew’s Last Stand	Honorable mention	
2012	Teju Cole	Open City	Winner	
2012	Amy Waldman	The Submission	Finalist	
2012	Stephanie Powell Watts	We Are Taking Only What We Need	Finalist	
2012	Chad Harbach	The Art of Fielding	Honorable mention	
2012	Marjorie Hudson	Accidental Birds of the Carolinas	Honorable mention	
2013	Kevin Powers	The Yellow Birds	Winner	
2013	Jennifer duBois	A Partial History of Lost Causes	Finalist	
2013	Vaddey Ratner	In the Shadow of the Banyan Tree	Finalist	
2013	Catherine Chung	Forgotten Country	Honorable mention	
2013	Peter M. Wheelwright	As It Is On Earth	Honorable mention	
2014	NoViolet Bulawayo	We Need New Names	Winner	
2014	Mitchell S. Jackson	The Residue Years	Finalist	
2014	Anthony Wallace	The Old Priest	Finalist	
2014	Jasmine Beach-Ferrara	Damn Love	Honorable mention	
2014	Kristopher Jansma	The Unchangeable Spots of Leopards	Honorable mention	
2014	Ethan Rutherford	The Peripatetic Coffin	Honorable mention	
2015	Arna Bontemps Hemenway	Elegy on Kinderklavier	Winner	
2015	Kim Fu	For Today I Am a Boy	Finalist	
2015	Atticus Lish	Preparation for the Next Life	Finalist	
2015	Mark Chiusano	Marine Park	Honorable mention	
2015	Diane Cook	Man V. Nature	Honorable mention	
2016	Ottessa Moshfegh	Eileen	Winner	
2016	S. M. Hulse	Black River	Finalist	
2016	Margaret Malone	People Like You	Finalist	
2016	Karim Dimechkie	Lifted by the Great Nothing	Honorable mention	
2016	Chigozie Obioma	The Fisherman	Honorable mention	
2017	Yaa Gyasi	Homegoing	Winner	
2017	Bill Beverly	Dodgers	Finalist	
2017	Leopoldine Core	When Watched	Finalist	
2017	Callan Wink	Dog Run Moon	Honorable mention	
2017	Melissa Yancy	Dog Years	Honorable mention	
2018	Weike Wang	Chemistry	Winner	
2018	Lisa Ko	The Leavers	Finalist	
2018	Adelia Saunders	Indelible	Finalist	
2018	Ian Bassingthwaighte	Live from Cairo	Honorable mention	
2018	Curtis Dawkins	The Graybar Hotel	Honorable mention	
2019	Tommy Orange	There There	Winner	
2019	Akwaeke Emezi	Freshwater	Finalist	
2019	Ling Ma	Severance	Finalist	
2019	Meghan Kenny	The Driest Season	Honorable mention	
2019	Nico Walker	Cherry	Honorable mention	
2020	Ruchika Tomar	A Prayer for Travelers	Winner	
2020	Madeline ffitch	Stay and Fight	Runner-Up	
2020	Regina Porter	The Travelers	Runner-Up	
2021	Kawai Strong Washburn	Sharks in the Time of Saviors	Winner	
2021	Maisy Card	These Ghosts Are Family	Finalist	
2021	Raven Leilani	Luster	Finalist	
2021	Douglas Stuart	Shuggie Bain	Finalist	
2021	C. Pam Zhang	How Much of These Hills Is Gold	Finalist	
2022	Torrey Peters	Detransition, Baby	Winner	
2022	Avni Doshi	Burnt Sugar	Finalist	
2022	Carolyn Ferrell	Dear Miss Metropolitan	Finalist	
2022	Honorée Fanonne Jeffers	The Love Songs of W.E.B. Du Bois	Finalist	
2022	Kirstin Valdez Quade	The Five Wounds	Finalist	
2023	Oscar Hokeah	Calling for a Blanket Dance	Winner	
2023	Lisa Hsiao Chen	Activities of Daily Living	Finalist	
2023	Ramona Emerson	Shutter	Finalist	
2023	Alissa Songsiridej	Little Rabbit	Finalist	
2023	Ryan Lee Wong	Which Side Are You On	Finalist	
2024	Fuentes Javier	Countries of Origin	Winner	
2024	Jinwoo Chong	Flux	Finalist	
2024	Miah Jeffra	American Gospel	Finalist	
2025	Michael Deagler	Early Sobrieties	Winner	
2025	Venita Blackburn	Dead in Long Beach, California	Finalist	
2025	Karol Lagodzki	Controlled Conversations	Finalist	
2025	Samuel Kọ́láwọ́lé	The Road to the Salt Sea	Finalist	
2026	Virginia Evans	The Correspondent	Winner	
2026	Susanna Kwan	Awake in the Floating City	Finalist	
2026	Maggie Su	Blob: A Love Story	Finalist	
