= Yaa Gyasi =

Ghanaian-American novelist (born 1989)

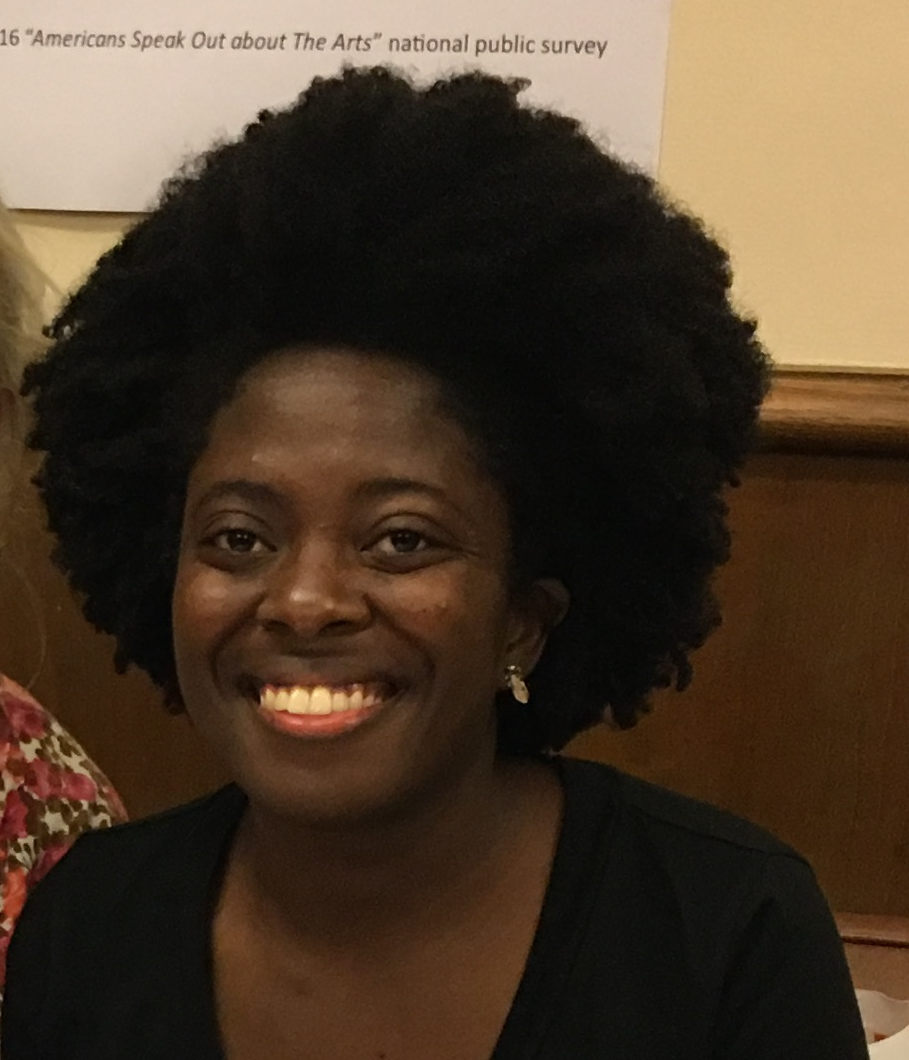
- Gyasi in 2017
- Born: 1989 (age 36–37); Mampong, Ghana
- Education: Stanford University (BA); University of Iowa (MFA)
- Writing career
- Notable works: Homegoing (2016), Transcendent Kingdom (2020)
- Notable awards: National Book Critics Circle's John Leonard Award; PEN/Hemingway Award; National Book Foundation's 5 Under 35 award; 2020 Vilcek Prize for Creative Promise in Literature

Yaa Gyasi (surname pronounced Jessie) (born 1989) is a Ghanaian-American novelist. Her work, most notably her 2016 debut novel Homegoing and her 2020 novel Transcendent Kingdom, features themes of lineage, generational trauma, and Black and African identities. At the age of 26, Gyasi won the National Book Critics Circle's John Leonard Award for Best First Book, the PEN/Hemingway Award for Debut Novel, the National Book Foundation's 5 Under 35 honors for 2016, and the 2017 American Book Award. She was awarded a Vilcek Prize for Creative Promise in Literature in 2020. As of 2019, Gyasi lives in Brooklyn, New York.

== Early life and education ==
Yaa Gyasi was born in Mampong, Ghana to Sophia, a nurse, and Kwaku Gyasi, a professor of French at the University of Alabama in Huntsville. Her family moved to the United States in 1991 so her father could complete his Ph.D. at Ohio State University. The family also lived in Illinois and Tennessee, and from the age of 10, Gyasi was raised in Huntsville, Alabama.

Gyasi recalls being shy as a child, feeling close to her brothers for their shared experiences as young immigrant children in Alabama, and turning to books as her "closest friends". She was encouraged by receiving a certificate of achievement signed by LeVar Burton for the first story she wrote, which she had submitted to the Reading Rainbow Young Writers and Illustrators Contest. At the age of 17, while attending Grissom High School, Gyasi was inspired after reading Toni Morrison's Song of Solomon to pursue writing as a career.

Gyasi earned a Bachelor of Arts in English from Stanford University, as well as a Master of Fine Arts from the Iowa Writers' Workshop, a creative writing program at the University of Iowa.

== Career ==
Shortly after graduating from Stanford, Gyasi began writing her debut novel Homegoing while working at a tech startup company in San Francisco. She resigned in 2012 when she was accepted to the University of Iowa and switched focus to writing full-time.

Homegoing was inspired by a 2009 trip to Ghana, funded by a grant to research her first book. Gyasi traveled to her mother's ancestral Ashanti home in Kumasi, visited with relatives, and toured the Cape Coast Castle, a colonial trading fort used to hold enslaved Africans before boarding ships to the Americas. This history contextualizes the novel's story, beginning with half-sisters Effia and Esi in eighteenth-century Ghana. Effia weds a British commander of Cape Coast Castle, while Esi is held captive in the dungeons of the castle before being forced onto a slave ship. The following chapters alternate between the perspectives of Effia's descendent and Esi's descendants, spanning a total of seven generations to present-day United States. The effects of colonialism are tracked through each family member and the historical milestones they live through, including conflict between the Fante and Asante nations, the beginning of cocoa farming in Ghana, plantation slavery in the American South, convict labor during the Reconstruction era, the civil rights movement, and the crack epidemic of the 1980s.

Gyasi completed the novel in 2015 and, after numerous initial offers, accepted a seven-figure advance from Knopf. Ta-Nehisi Coates selected Homegoing for the National Book Foundation's 2016 5 under 35 award, and the novel was also selected for the National Book Critics Circle's John Leonard Award, the PEN/Hemingway Award for best first book, and the American Book Award for contributions to diversity in American literature.

Gyasi's writing has also appeared in such publications as African American Review, Callaloo, Guernica The Guardian, and Granta. She cites Toni Morrison (Song of Solomon), Gabriel García Márquez (One Hundred Years of Solitude), James Baldwin (Go Tell It on the Mountain), Edward P. Jones (Lost in the City), and Jhumpa Lahiri (Unaccustomed Earth) as inspirations. In 2017, Gyasi was chosen by Forbes for their "30 under 30 List".

In February 2020, Knopf published Gyasi's second book Transcendent Kingdom. The novel features characters from a short story that Gyasi published in Guernica magazine in 2015 entitled "Inscape." Transcendent Kingdom tells the story of 28-year-old Gifty in a series of flashbacks and flash-forwards, from her family's migration from Ghana to Alabama, the abandonment of her father, and her mother's struggle with depression after Gifty's brother overdoses at a young age. The novel explores the effects of racism as they manifest in addiction, depression, and family instability.

Sara Collins of The Guardian described Transcendent Kingdom as a "profound follow-up to Homegoing", USA Today said "it's stealthily devastating", and The Vox, Chicago Review of Books, and The New Republic also reviewed it favorably.

In 2021, Gyasi authored the short story "Bad Blood" to be featured in The 1619 Project: A New Origin Story. The story depicts a young black mother's hypochondria as an effect of the history of racism and discrimination in healthcare, citing the 1932 Tuskegee Syphilis Study.

Gyasi has been outspoken about her widespread recognition as a black author. In March 2021, she wrote an article in The Guardian about the resurgent popularity of Homegoing during the Black Lives Matter protests the previous summer. She wrote: "While I do devoutly believe in the power of literature to challenge, to deepen, to change, I also know that buying books by black authors is but a theoretical, grievously belated and utterly impoverished response to centuries of physical and emotional harm."

She is a 2026-2027 Fellow of the Dorothy and Lewis B. Cullman Center for Scholars and Writers at the New York Public Library.

== Awards ==
- 2016: National Book Critics Circle's John Leonard Award for Best First Book for Homegoing
- 2016: National Book Foundation's 5 Under 35 award
- 2017: American Book Award for Homegoing
- 2017: Granta Best of Young American Novelists
- 2017: PEN/Hemingway Award for Homegoing
- 2020: Vilcek Prize for Creative Promise in Literature, Vilcek Foundation
- 2020, Great Immigrants Award named by Carnegie Corporation of New York
- 2021: Women's Prize for Fiction, shortlisted for Transcendent Kingdom
- 2023: Royal Society of Literature International Writer

== Select Works ==
=== Novels ===
- Homegoing. Knopf. 2016. ISBN 9781101947135.
- Transcendent Kingdom. Knopf. 2020. ISBN 9780525658184.

=== Short stories ===
- "Bad Blood" in The 1619 Project: A New Origin Story (2021)
