= All Aunt Hagar's Children =

2006 short story collection by Edward P. Jones

- First edition
- Author: Edward P. Jones
- Language: English
- Genre: Short stories
- Publisher: Amistad
- Publication date: August 29, 2006
- Publication place: United States
- Media type: Print

All Aunt Hagar's Children (2006) is a collection of short stories by African-American author Edward P. Jones; it was his first book after winning the 2004 Pulitzer Prize for The Known World. The collection of 14 stories centers on African Americans in Washington D.C. during the 20th century. The stories can be broken down by how the characters suffer burdens from families, society, and themselves. "Each story traces a journey--planned or unplanned, taken or failed--and an obvious root/route symbolism runs throughout the collection." Jones is noted for writing long short stories and these are no exception, they are sometimes called "novelistic", characters are fully fleshed out.

The stories of his first and third book are connected. As Neely Tucker says:

"There are 14 stories in "Lost," ordered from the youngest to the oldest character, and there are 14 stories in "Hagar's," also ordered from youngest to oldest character. The first story in the first book is connected to the first story in the second book, and so on. To get the full history of the characters, one must read the first story in each book, then go to the second story in each, and so on."

== Reception ==
All Aunt Hagar's Children won the 2007 Hurston/Wright Legacy Award. In 2024, it was ranked #70 on the New York Times list of best 100 books of the 21st century.

== Stories ==
- In the Blink of God's Eye

In 1901, Ruth and Aubrey Patterson struggle to adapt to harsh realities of urban life in Washington, including encountering a bundled baby tied to a tree

- Spanish in the Morning
- Resurrecting Methuselah
- Old Boys, Old Girls

Caesar Matthews is sentenced to a seven-year sentence in Lorton, Washington D.C.'s prison in Virginia, for second-degree murder after evading arrest for shooting another man. Upon his release, Caesar is connected with housing and a dish-washing job when he reluctantly reconnects with his brother, Alonzo, a corporate attorney. He also reconnects with a former girlfriend, Yvonne, who lives in his building.

- All Aunt Hagar's Children

A twenty-four-year-old veteran of the Korean War is living an "undistinguished life" back home in D.C., nine months home from duty, and preparing to head to Alaska to hunt for gold with a war buddy. He is unexpectedly approached by a closely-knit group of women with a long history together in Alabama — his mother, his Aunt Penny, and Miss Agatha — to investigate the murder of Aunt Penny's son, Ike.

- A Poor Guatemalan Dreams of a Downtown in Peru

Arlene Baxter enjoys a safe childhood with her family in rural Maryland until a natural disaster takes her family, but spares her. It is the first of several deaths she witnesses throughout her life of witnessing, being uncannily saved from each.

- Root Worker

In 1963, Dr. Glynnis Holloway's mother, Alberta, suffers another of her "head plagues" which have intermittently afflicted her for many years. When doctors at St. Elizabeth's Hospital are unable to treat her, the Holloway family, along with Alberta's caretaker, Maddie, return to their native North Carolina to enlist the treatment of Imogene Satterfield, a renowned root doctor of many decades. Tensions arise between Glynnis and Imogene due to their contrasting methodologies and credentials in treating illness.

- Common Law

- Adam Robinson Acquires Grandparents and a Little Sister

Noah Robinson reflects on the disappearance of trees in Washington while riding in a cab with his wife of forty-seven years to take their grandson, Adam, home from social services.

- The Devil Swims Across the Anacostia River

Laverne Shepherd unexpectedly comes face-to-face with the Devil wearing a splendid gray gabardine suit while grocery shopping in a D.C. Safeway. Both of her grandmothers had warned her that she would know the Devil when he appeared and upon their meeting, Laverne recalls a supernatural episode that happened on a beach along the Anacostia River fourteen years earlier.

- Blindsided

Roxanne Stapleton, a frequent party attender who left her daughter behind with her parents in her native Louisiana, suddenly becomes blind while riding the D.C. Transit bus. Her neighbor, Agnes, a devout Catholic, and her partner, Melvin, become her caretakers and try to help her adjust to the new reality of her condition.

- A Rich Man

In 1977, Horace Perkins retires from a career at the Department of Defense and moves into an apartment for senior citizens with his wife, Loneese, of forty years. In their new home, he intends to become a new man and respect his marriage vows after unhappy years together.

- Bad Neighbors

Twelve members of the Bennington family make a bad impression upon moving into their house on 8th Street, N.W. owned by a white man in Arlington. Their disruption later prompts the good neighbors of 8th Street to raise money to buy the house to rent to more agreeable people.

- Tapestry

Anne Perry marries a sleeping car porter, George Carter, which she begins to question immediately following their nuptials in early 1930s Picayune, Mississippi.
