= Allison Lynn =

American novelist

- Born: 1971 (age 54–55)
- Education: Dartmouth College; New York University
- Occupation: Novelist
- Spouse: Michael Dahlie
- Children: 1

Allison Lynn (born 1971) is an American novelist. She is best known for Now You See It (Simon & Schuster, 2004), which tells the story of an American woman's disappearance and her husband's search for her. The novel won the William Faulkner Award and the Bronx Chapter One Prize. US Weekly named the novel a "hot book pick" in the summer of 2004.

Lynn is a graduate of Dartmouth College and New York University's Creative Writing Program, where she recently taught courses in fiction. She used to live in New York City with her husband, the novelist Michael Dahlie (A Gentleman's Guide to Graceful Living), but they and their son now reside in Indianapolis. She teaches at Butler University. Her second novel, The Exiles, was published by New Harvest/Houghton Mifflin Harcourt in July 2013.
