= Known world =

known world may refer to:

- the extent of geographic knowledge of a given culture at a given historical period, see history of geography
  - Early world maps lists a number of maps showing the known world from the perspective of various historical periods
- Ecumene, a Greek geographical concept for the inhabited or known parts of the world
- The Known World, a 2003 historical novel by Edward P. Jones
- The Known World of A Song of Ice and Fire
- The Known World of Mystara, a campaign setting in the role playing game Dungeons & Dragons

== See also ==
- History of cartography
- Old World, consists of Africa, Europe, and Asia
- Ptolemy's world map, a map of the world known to Hellenistic society in the 2nd century
- Midgard, a Germanic mythological concept for the abode of man
- Tianxia, a Chinese concept for "all under heaven"
