= Gabriel Brownstein =

American writer (born 1966)

Gabriel Brownstein (born 13 April 1966 in New York City) is an American writer, best known for his short story collection The Curious Case of Benjamin Button, Apt. 3W (2002) which won the Hemingway Foundation/PEN Award in 2003, his novel The Man From Beyond (2005), and his two works of non-fiction The Open Heart Club (2018) and The Secret Mind of Bertha Pappenheim (2024)

He is a graduate of Oberlin College and Columbia University, he is also a professor in English at St John's University.
