= The Tenth Muse =

The Tenth Muse may refer to:

- Sappho (c. 630 – c. 570 BC), Greek poet
- Juana Inés de la Cruz (1651–1695), Mexican poet and playwright
- Tenth Muse, a comic book series by Darren G. Davis
- The Tenth Muse: My Life in Food, a book by Judith Jones
- The Tenth Muse, a book by Catherine Chung

== See also ==
- The Tenth Muse Lately Sprung Up in America, a book of poetry by Anne Bradstreet
