= Blood magic =

Blood magic may refer to:

- Blood ritual, any ritual that involves the intentional release of blood
- "Blood Magic", an episode of the TV series Grimm
- Blood Magic Gang, a Russian serial killer gang
- Blood Magic, the original title of the 2005 video game Dawn of Magic
- Blood Magic, a 2010 novel in the World of the Lupi series by Eileen Wilks
- Blood Magic, a 2001 short story collection by Lucy A. Snyder
- Blood Magic, a Minecraft mod that allows players to perform magic using blood

== See also ==
- Blood & Magic, a 1996 video game
- The Magic of Blood, a 1994 short story collection by Dagoberto Gilb
