= During the Reign of the Queen of Persia =

1983 book by Joan Chase

During the Reign of the Queen of Persia is the first novel by American writer Joan Chase. On its publication in 1983 it won the Hemingway Foundation/PEN Award.

The story is told from the perspective of the four granddaughters of the "Queen of Persia", an Ohio farmwife, during the 1950s. The narration takes place in the first person plural, an effect that Margaret Atwood believed evoked the collective female unconscious. The plot casts backwards and forwards through time, being divided into three main sections: the first has the narrating sisters in their teens, the second regresses back to their childhood, and the third see the sale of the family farm and the dispersal of the family.

The book drew comparisons to the works of Anne Tyler, Marilynne Robinson, Douglas Unger and Susan Engberg.

After falling out of print the book was republished in 2014 by New York Review Books.

== Plot ==
In Ohio four cousins Celia and Jenny (who are sisters) and Anne and Katie (who are sisters) grow up on the farm of their maternal grandmother, whom they jokingly have nicknamed the Queen of Persia. The granddaughters are relatively close in age and act nearly as one body until their slightly older cousin Celia hits puberty and begins to attract male attention, much to the distress of her mother, Aunt Libby. As Celia begins to date, she and Aunt Libby constantly fight. Eventually Celia finds a responsible older boyfriend, Phillip, who wants to marry Celia and whom Aunt Libby approves of. The family eventually learns that Phillip has impregnated another woman. Though Phillip still wants to marry Celia she refuses him and becomes friends with Louanne, the woman he impregnated. Celia eventually settles down with Jimmy, one of her previous suitors, and much to her grandmother's distress, becomes fixated on motherhood.

When they are children the girls learns the family history of how their grandmother came to be a wealthy woman. Forced into domestic labour at an early age, Lil married a man she loved, Jacob, who quickly turned abusive. She gave birth to seven children; two sons who died in infancy and five daughters: May, Elinor, Grace, Libby and Rachel. At a family reunion she encounters her rich uncle Burl who, as she is the daughter of his favorite sister, decides to help her financially. Endowed with his gifts, Lil becomes an independent woman buying farmland, educating her daughters and ensuring that they always have a home to stay in as they struggle through their marriages and motherhood.

Grace has a tempestuous on again and off again marriage with a handsome athlete turned salesman and wannabe writer named Neil. Even after they marry Grace continues to return to her mother's home with her daughters for long periods. When Neil drops by to bring her home she declines to return with him. He defers his anger onto the cousins for acting up and tries to whip his daughters only to give up and end up revealing instead that their mother is dying.

Grace's illness brings her the attention of her sister Elinor, a rich ad executive living in New York City. She is a Christian Scientist and persuades her sister and nieces that the religion will save Grace. Though Grace manages to outlive the time frame her doctor's had promised she does die and Elinor misses her death by a matter of hours. To everyone's surprise Grace leaves "Neil's" house in Illinois to her daughters asking that it be sold and the proceeds remain in trust for them. Neil destroys Grace's will, but Lil owns the loan for the house and calls it in, determined he will get nothing. Shortly after Anne climbs a tree to its highest point and falls and injures herself trying to swing down off it. Neil comes back to tend to her and retrieve his children and in the aftermath Lil decides to let him keep the house.

The girls grow up with Anne and Katie living with Neil but spending summers on the farm. After Celia's marriage Lil decides to sell the land to a development that wants to turn the area into a mall. The family is devastated but Lil throws out nearly everything left in the house. They receive news from Texas that Celia is pregnant; later Aunt Libby gets a call from a doctor informing her that Celia tried to commit suicide and lost the baby. She will be returning home into the care of her mother.

== Characters ==
- Lil Krauss, the matriarch of the family, nicknamed the Queen of Persia by her granddaughters. Born sometime in the 1880s. She is married to Jacob and is the mother of five daughters: May, Elinor, Grace, Libby and Rachel.
- Jacob Krauss, Lil's alcoholic, abusive husband.
- May, the mother of the oldest cousin, Valerie.
- Elinor, a New York City ad executive who is a devout Christian Scientist and the only one of her sisters who is childless.
- Grace, who is married to Neil, a charming cad who was once Lil's border and who works as a travelling salesman. Once a teacher she gave up her career to have two daughters, Anne and Katie. She later develops breast cancer.
- Libby, a cynic married to a butcher, Uncle Dan, who is the only faithful and loving husband in the family. The mother of Celia and Jenny.
- Rachel, the mother of Rossie, the only boy cousin.
