= Regina Porter =

American fiction writer

- Born: Savannah, Georgia
- Education: University of Iowa
- Writing career
- Genre: Fiction
- Notable work: The Travelers

Regina Porter is an American novelist and playwright. She is the author of the novel The Travelers, which was a finalist for the PEN/Hemingway Award for Debut Novel, was longlisted for the Orwell Prize for political fiction, and was named one of the Best Books of 2019 by Esquire.

== Literary career ==
Porter received an MFA in fiction from the Iowa Writers' Workshop, after which her novel manuscript for The Travelers sold to Hogarth Press in the US for a reported $500,000 and in the UK and Germany for six-figure deals.

Porter's novel, The Travelers, was published in June, 2019. Following two interconnected American families from the 1950s to the 2000s, it explores generational trauma and history. It includes photographs.

The San Francisco Chronicle called it "one of the most formally surprising — and successfully so — debuts in years," writing: "In chronicling these journeys, Porter moves back and forth through characters and time at an impressive clip, writing with authority, insight and humor. Porter proves as intelligent an observer of the startling shapes a lifetime can take as its most intimate and unforgettable moments." Entertainment Weekly praised how "the backdrop of events may be familiar (the Vietnam War, racial protests in the ’60s), but the complex, beautifully drawn characters are unique and indelible."

The Guardian described it as "a sparkling American epic," but observed that: "It’s not always easy to keep track of who’s who. . . and there are moments when technical virtuosity tips over into tricksiness. On the whole, however, this is an exhilarating ride." For The Star Tribune, Porter "upends any expectations of the traditional family saga by constantly shape-shifting ... Most things, however, don’t necessarily come full circle, resolve or round out — and that’s not a criticism. This lack of neatness feels closer to real life than most family sagas, whose stories often tidy up with easy reconciliation or syrupy sentimentalism."

The Times Literary Supplement highlighted "Porter’s uncanny facility for voice," before noting: "Most striking is the novel’s keen understanding of history, not as a passive set of inevitable circumstances but as the actions of individuals, their choices limited or empowered: why people live in certain neighborhoods, take or refuse jobs, migrate, marry, even murder. Porter shows that it matters whether the encounters that define us happen in Venice Beach in 1986, in the 'only gay squat house in Berlin' in the 1970s, on a deserted road in Buckner County, Georgia in 1966, or on that same road after its gentrification in the 1990s."

== Bibliography ==
- The Travelers (Hogarth Press, 2019)
- The Rich People Have Gone Away (Penguin Random House, 2024)
