= Edward P. Jones =

American novelist and short story writer

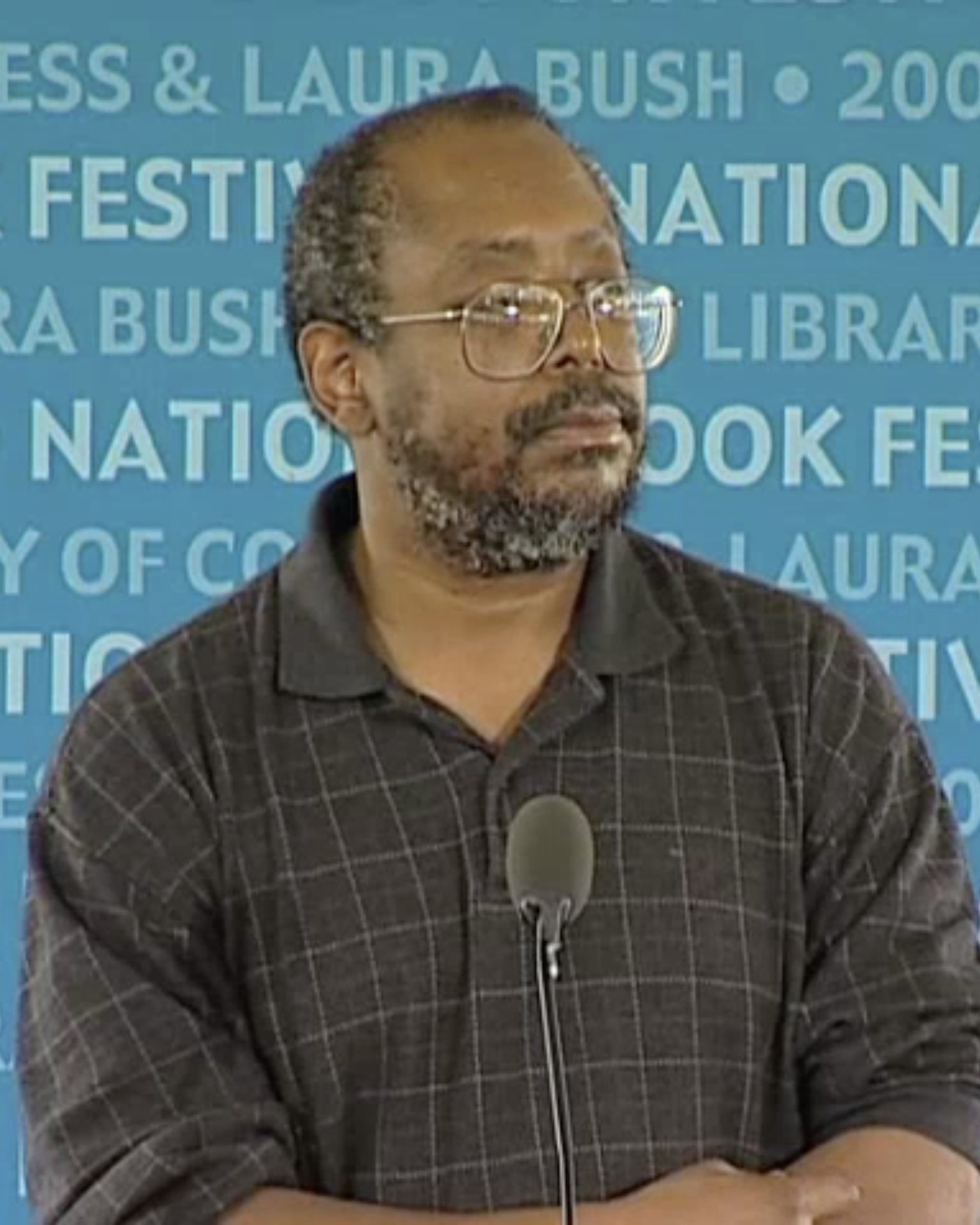
- Jones in 2004
- Born: October 5, 1950 (age 75); Washington, D.C., U.S.
- Education: College of the Holy Cross (BA); University of Virginia (MFA)
- Writing career
- Genre: Narrative fiction
- Subjects: Slavery; discrimination; hardship
- Notable works: Lost in the City (1992); The Known World (2003); All Aunt Hagar's Children (2006)
- Notable awards: PEN/Hemingway Award (1992); National Book Critics Circle Award (2003); Lannan Literary Award (2003); Pulitzer Prize for Fiction (2004); MacArthur Fellowship (2004); International Dublin Literary Award (2005); PEN/Faulkner Award (2007); PEN/Malamud Award (2010)

Edward Paul Jones (born October 5, 1950) is an American novelist and short story writer. He became popular for writing about the African-American experience in the United States, and received the Pulitzer Prize for Fiction and the International Dublin Literary Award for The Known World (2003).

Journalist Neely Tucker described Jones in The Washington Post as "arguably the greatest fiction writer the nation's capital has ever produced". According to biographer Diane Brady of Fortune, Jones has been recognized "as one of the finest writers of his generation". He has been a professor of creative writing at the University of Virginia, George Mason University, the University of Maryland, and Princeton University. In 2010, Jones became a professor of literature at George Washington University, where he was previously the Wang Visiting Professor in Contemporary English Literature.

== Early life and education ==
Jones was born in Washington, D.C., where he was raised in poor all-black neighborhoods. When he was two years old, his father, a Jamaican immigrant, left the family. His mother, Jeanette M. Jones, had been pregnant at the time with a third child, Eunice (who eventually died of lung cancer in 1973). His only brother, Joseph, was born mentally disabled. The family resided in a series of impoverished shacks and tenements northwest of D.C.'s center, ultimately moving place-to-place eighteen times in eighteen years.

Jones was recognized for talents in mathematics and literature as a child. At the age of five, he was sent to a Catholic school, where his performance enabled him to skip a grade, but his mother could not afford the tuition and withdrew him. He spent his early education at Walker-Jones Elementary School, Shaw Junior High School, then finally at the local Cardozo High School. Jones graduated from high school as an honors student in English, although he had to sign his own report cards as his mother was illiterate.

In the fall of 1968, Jones enrolled at the College of the Holy Cross in Worcester, Massachusetts, with the intent to study mathematics. He wrote for the school newspaper, The Crusader, and was a member of the college's Black Student Union along with classmates Clarence Thomas, Theodore Wells, and Ed Jenkins. After taking a nineteenth-century novel class at the college, Jones developed an interest in writing. He graduated from Holy Cross with his Bachelor of Arts in English literature in 1972.

In 1979, Jones entered the University of Virginia to pursue graduate studies in creative writing, receiving a Master of Fine Arts (M.F.A.) in 1981.

== Career ==
His first book, Lost in the City (1992), is a collection of short stories about the African-American working class in 20th-century Washington, D.C. In the early stories are some who are like first-generation immigrants, as they have come to the city as part of the Great Migration from the rural South.

His second book, The Known World, was set in a fictional Virginia county and had a protagonist who was a Black planter and slaveholder. It won the 2004 Pulitzer Prize for Fiction and the 2005 International Dublin Literary Award.

Jones's third book, All Aunt Hagar's Children, was published in 2006. Like Lost in the City, it is a collection of short stories that deal with African Americans, mostly in Washington, D.C. Several of the stories had been previously published in The New Yorker magazine. The stories in the book take up the lives of ancillary characters in Lost in the City. In 2007, it was a finalist for the PEN/Faulkner Award, which was won by Philip Roth's Everyman.

The stories of Jones' first and third book are connected. As Wyatt Mason wrote in Harper's Magazine in 2006:

The fourteen stories of All Aunt Hagar's Children revisit not merely the city of Washington but the fourteen stories of Lost in the City. Each new story—and many of them, in their completeness, feel like fully realized little novels—is connected in the same sequence, as if umbilically, to the corresponding story in the first book. Literature is, of course, littered with sequels—its Rabbits and Bechs; its Zuckermans and Kepeshes—but this is not, in the main, Jones’s idea of a reprise. Each revisitation provides a different kind of interplay between the two collections.

Neely Tucker wrote in 2009:

It's gone almost completely unnoticed, but the two collections are a matched set: There are 14 stories in Lost, ordered from the youngest to the oldest character, and there are 14 stories in Hagar's, also ordered from youngest to oldest character. The first story in the first book is connected to the first story in the second book, and so on. To get the full history of the characters, one must read the first story in each book, then go to the second story in each, and so on.

In the spring and fall semesters of 2009, Jones was a visiting professor of creative writing at the George Washington University. In fall 2010 he joined the English department faculty to teach creative writing.

== Awards and nominations ==
- 1992: Nominated National Book Award, Lost in the City
- 1993: Awarded PEN/Hemingway Award, Lost in the City
- 1994: Awarded Lannan Literary Award for Fiction, Lost in the City
- 2003: Nominated National Book Award, The Known World
- 2003: Awarded Lannan Literary Award for Fiction
- 2003: Awarded National Book Critics Circle Award, The Known World
- 2004: Awarded Pulitzer Prize for Fiction, The Known World
- 2005: Awarded International Dublin Literary Award, The Known World
- 2005: Awarded MacArthur Fellowship
- 2007: Nominated PEN/Faulkner Award, All Aunt Hagar's Children
- 2008: Elected to the American Academy of Arts and Sciences
- 2010: Awarded PEN/Malamud Award for excellence in the art of the short story
- 2019: Inducted into the American Academy of Arts and Letters

== Bibliography ==
- Lost in the City (1992)
- The Known World (2003)
- All Aunt Hagar's Children (2006)

== Notes ==
=== Additional references ===
- Tucker, Neely (November 15, 2009). "The known world of Edward P. Jones" (PDF). The Washington Post Magazine. pp. 12–21.
- Brady, Diane (2012). Fraternity. Spiegel & Grau (published January 3, 2012). ISBN 978-0385524742.
