= Ellen Ullman =

American computer programmer and author (born 1949)

- Born: June 13, 1949 (age 77); Queens, New York, U.S.
- Education: Cornell University (BA)
- Occupations: Programmer, author
- Spouse: Elliot Ross
- Writing career
- Genres: Memoir, novel
- Notable work: Close to the Machine (1997)

Ellen Ullman (born June 13, 1949) is an American computer programmer and author. She became widely known for her 1997 memoir Close to the Machine: Technophilia and Its Discontents, a set of essays about her experiences as a woman in the male-dominated programming field at the start of the personal computer era. She then turned her attention to writing novels: The Bug (2003) and By Blood (2012) both made the New York Times Notable Book list. Besides writing, Ullman has worked as a consultant to software companies and been a technology commentator for NPR's All Things Considered.

== Biography ==
Ullman was born in Flushing, Queens. When she was six months old, she was adopted by an affluent New York City family. Her adoptive father was an accountant, and her adoptive mother a housewife. Ullman later said, all she knows of her birth mother was that she was "a pretty Jewish lady". Ullman earned a B.A. in English at Cornell University in 1971.

Following graduation, she joined the Ithaca Video Project, an activist non-profit collective that made documentaries using the Sony Portapak. At a Video Project workshop, she "saw people doing very early computer-aided animation, and they told me they were doing it with Fortran. That was the first time that I thought programming might do something interesting." She moved to the Bay Area in 1972. She became a member of an underground communist party for a year. In Close to the Machine, she wrote half-jokingly that when she started out in computer programming, her manager "was amazed at my ability to work hundred-hour weeks without complaint, and I was promoted rapidly. He did not know that my endurance came from my year in the party. Being a cadre in an underground political party, as it turned out, was excellent training for the life of a computer programmer."

In 1979, Ullman was intrigued by a TRS-80 microcomputer that she noticed in the window of a San Francisco Radio Shack store; she purchased the early PC and taught herself to code. Later that year she obtained her "first real job" as a programmer, and continued to work in the industry over the next two decades. In reflecting back on what attracted her to a career in software engineering, "a field for which I do not have native talent", she attributes it partly to the influence of her adoptive father's family, and its sizable number of computer scientists and mathematicians.

In 1994 she began writing about "her chaotic profession" of software engineering, and the rising importance of software in society. Her essay, "Out of Time: Reflections on the Programming Life", opened with these sentences:

People imagine that programming is logical, a process like fixing a clock. Nothing could be further from the truth. Programming is more like an illness, a fever, an obsession. It's like riding a train and never being able to get off.

"Out of Time" was included in the anthology, Resisting the Virtual Life (1995). The next year, her essay on email courtship was published in the Wired Women anthology. She was also serving as a technology commentator for NPR's All Things Considered.

She collected ten of her autobiographical writings—three short sections of which derived from commentaries she had presented on NPR—and published them with City Lights Books in 1997 under the title, Close to the Machine. The book was praised in The New York Times for the author's "cool, efficient voice". In the San Francisco Chronicle, Patricia Holt wrote: "Hundreds of books purport to tell us what the computer revolution really means, but none hold a candle to Ellen Ullman's astonishing novelistic memoir, Close to the Machine. In a 2021 retrospective, Thomas Haigh asserted that

the book grips because she puts us right inside the mind of a 1990s software developer. In a foreword to a rerelease of Close to the Machine, Jaron Lanier recalled his amazement on first reading it, to discover "a computer nerd who could write." It formed "a bridge between reality at large and the empire of nerds, which seemed non-reactive and immune to subjectivity, beauty, love, or the acknowledgment of fundamental frailty." More than 20 years on, I have encountered no comparably compelling memoirs written by other programmers.

Ullman's opinion pieces on the effects of digital technology, and the vagaries of human-computer interaction, started appearing in Harper's Magazine, Salon.com, and Wired. She said in a 2017 interview, "The fact that I became someone who writes about computing technology, as opposed to someone who lived inside the culture that was creating it, came as a shock to me."

The Bug (2003) was her first published work of fiction. The principal action occurs in the mid-1980s. Roberta Walton is a Ph.D. graduate in linguistics unable to find a job in academia. She gets hired as a tester by the Telligentsia database software company in Silicon Valley. While performing user interface testing, she encounters a bug that crashes the computer; she reports it to lead programmer Ethan Levin. The seemingly random bug, nicknamed "The Jester" for its tendency to crop up at unexpected and embarrassing moments, becomes an increasingly serious matter that jeopardizes the financial health of the company. Levin deteriorates under the strain as months go by and he still cannot figure out the root cause of the intermittent failures. Walton, by contrast, thrives on the challenge posed by "The Jester". She develops programming skills of her own as she too works to solve the mystery. The New York Times labeled it a "thrilling and intellectually fearless first novel". Besides making the New York Times Notable Book list for 2003, The Bug was a runner-up in 2004 for the PEN/Hemingway Award.

Her next novel, By Blood (2012), was a departure from her previous work. It is a suspenseful psychological tale unconnected to the computing field. In 1970s San Francisco, a classics professor on leave from his university moves into a downtown office that is adjacent to a psychotherapist's office. The professor begins compulsively eavesdropping on the story of one of the therapist's patients, a young lesbian describing her identity quest as an adopted child trying to track down her birth mother. The professor becomes a kind of aural stalker, "counting down the hours until the patient's next session". Minna Proctor of The Literary Review called By Blood "irresistible – twisty-turny, insightful, revelatory – funny when it's tragic, and complicated when it's funny."

Ullman's 2017 memoir, Life in Code: A Personal History of Technology, assembled more than twenty years of her writings on digital culture. It was named one of the best books of the year 2017, by San Francisco Chronicle. In recent decades, she has made her primary home in San Francisco, while spending part of each year in New York. She has advocated for "the general public to learn to code" as a means "to demystify all the algorithms that are around us."

== Bibliography ==
=== Memoirs ===
- Close to the Machine: Technophilia and its Discontents. San Francisco: City Lights Books. 1997. ISBN 978-0872863323.
- Life in Code: A Personal History of Technology. New York: MCD/Farrar, Straus and Giroux. 2017. ISBN 978-0374534516.

=== Novels ===
- The Bug. New York: Nan A. Talese/Doubleday. 2003. ISBN 978-0385508605.
- By Blood: A Novel. New York: Farrar, Straus and Giroux. 2012. ISBN 978-0374117559.

=== Selected articles and essays ===
- "Out of Time: Reflections on the Programming Life". In Brook, James; Boal, Iain (eds.). Resisting the Virtual Life: The Culture and Politics of Information. San Francisco: City Lights Publishers, 1995. ISBN 978-0872862999.
- "Getting close to the machine". Harper's Magazine. June 1995.
- "Come In, CQ: The Body on the Wire". In Cherny, Lynn; Weise, Elizabeth Reba (eds.). Wired Women: Gender and New Realities in Cyberspace. Seattle: Seal Press, 1996. ISBN 978-1878067739.
- "The O.S. in twilight". Harper's Magazine. December 1997.
- "The dumbing-down of programming: Rebelling against Microsoft and its wizards, an engineer rediscovers the joys of difficult computing. First of two parts". Salon.com. May 12, 1998. Archived from the original on August 31, 2014.
- "The dumbing-down of programming: Part Two: Returning to the source. Once knowledge disappears into code, how do we retrieve it?". Salon. May 13, 1998. Archived from the original on August 25, 2013.
- "Programming under the Wizard's Spell". Harper's Magazine. August 1998.
- "Of Machines, Methods, And Madness". IEEE Software. Vol. 15, no. 3. May–June 1998. pp. 42–45. doi:10.1109/MS.1998.676733.
- "The Myth of Order: The real lesson of Y2K is that software operates just like any natural system: out of control". Wired. April 1999. Archived from the original on May 2, 2015.
- "Twilight of the Crypto-Geeks". Salon. May 13, 2000. Archived from the original on October 2, 2015.
- "The Museum of Me". Harper's Magazine. May 2000.
- "Geeks Win". The New York Times Book Review. November 4, 2001. p. BR18. ISSN 0362-4331. Review of Steve Lohr's book, Go To.
- "Programming the Post-Human". Harper's Magazine. October 2002.
- "The Orphans of Invention". The New York Times. May 22, 2003. p. A33.
- "The Scientific Method: Memory and Megabytes". The American Scholar. Vol. 72, no. 4. Autumn 2003. pp. 119–123. JSTOR 41221198.
- "The Scientific Method: Dining with Robots". The American Scholar. Vol. 73, no. 4. Autumn 2004. pp. 145–150. JSTOR 41221351.
- "The Boss in the Machine". The New York Times. February 19, 2005. p. A15.
- "Identity Stolen? Take a Number". The New York Times. July 17, 2006. p. A17.
- "My Secret Life". The New York Times. January 1, 2009. p. A23.
- "The Lives They Lived: Dennis Ritchie, b. 1941". The New York Times Magazine. December 25, 2011. p. 24.
- "How to Be a 'Woman Programmer'". The New York Times. May 18, 2013.
- "Introduction". In Bosch, Torie (ed.). "You Are Not Expected to Understand This": How 26 Lines of Code Changed the World. Princeton University Press, 2022. ISBN 978-0691208480.
