= Brigid Pasulka =

American novelist

- Education: Dartmouth College; University of Illinois Chicago (MA)
- Occupation: Author
- Writing career
- Notable awards: PEN/Hemingway Award for Debut Novel (2010)
- Website: www.brigidpasulka.com

Brigid Pasulka is an American author and winner of the 2010 Hemingway Foundation/PEN Award for her novel A Long, Long Time Ago and Essentially True, which she wrote after spending a year in Kraków, Poland. Her second novel, The Sun and Other Stars, was published in 2014.

Pasulka, a descendant of Ukrainian and Polish immigrants, grew up in a farming township in Northern Illinois, and now lives in Chicago, where she currently teaches at Whitney Young Magnet High School. She is a graduate of Dartmouth College and the Program for Writers at the University of Illinois Chicago (M.A.).
