= Oscar Hokeah =

Native American writer (born 1975)

- Citizenship: Cherokee Nation, Kiowa Tribe, USA
- Education: Institute of American Indian Arts
- Alma mater: University of Oklahoma
- Writing career
- Genre: fiction
- Notable awards: PEN/Hemingway Award for Debut Novel
- Website: oscarhokeah.com

Oscar Hokeah (born December 25, 1975) is a Native American writer.

== Education ==
A graduate of the University of Oklahoma and the Institute of American Indian Arts, he is a citizen of the Cherokee Nation and Kiowa Indian Tribe of Oklahoma.

== Career and honors ==
His debut novel Calling for a Blanket Dance (2022), which won the PEN/Hemingway Award for Debut Novel and was on the Aspen Words Literary Prize shortlist in 2023.

== Bibliography ==
- "Náu jépjègàu (Our Family): Relationality in Kiowa Literature (2012)
- Calling for a Blanket Dance (2022)
