= Homegoing (Gyasi novel) =

2016 novel by Yaa Gyasi

- hardcover dustjacket (1st ed.)
- Author: Yaa Gyasi
- Cover artist: Peter Mendelsund
- Language: English
- Genre: Historical fiction
- Published: 2016 (Penguin Random House)
- Publication place: United States
- Media type: Print (hardback)
- Pages: 320 pp. (1st edition)
- ISBN: 978-1-10194-713-5

Homegoing is the debut historical fiction novel by Ghanaian-American author Yaa Gyasi, published in 2016. Each chapter in the novel follows a different descendant of an Asante woman named Maame, starting in the 18th century with her two daughters, who are half-sisters, separated by circumstance: Effia marries James Collins, the British governor in charge of Cape Coast Castle, while her half-sister Esi is sadly held captive in the dungeons below. Subsequent chapters follow their children and following generations. The chapters go into detail and speak about their individual and very interesting experiences.

The novel was selected in 2016 for the National Book Foundation's 5 Under 35 award, the National Book Critics Circle's John Leonard Award for Best First Book, and was longlisted for the Dylan Thomas Prize in 2017. It received the Hemingway Foundation/PEN Award for 2017, an American Book Award, and the Vilcek Prize for Creative Promise in Literature.

== Plot ==
=== Effia's line ===
Effia is raised by her supposed mother, Baaba, who is extremely cruel to her. She is shown to be very mean throughout the story. Known as beauty, Effia is intended to be married to the future chief of her village, but her mother has ulterior motives to force Effia to leave the family village by marrying a British merchant, James Collins, the governor of Cape Coast Castle. She returns to her family village one time, when her father dies, and learns that Baaba is not her mother and that she is the daughter of an unknown slave.

Quey, Effia and James' son, is raised in the Cape Coast Castle. He befriends a local boy named Cudjo and realize that they are attracted to one another. In fear of their relationship James sends Quey to England. When he returns, Quey is assigned to help to strengthen the ties between his familial village and the British merchants. Eventually, Fiifi, his mother, Effia's brother, along with Cudjo, raid the village of the Asante people and bring back the daughter of an Asante chief. Realizing that to marry her would join his people, the Fantes, with the Asantes, Quey resolves to forget Cudjo and marry the Asante girl. As their son James gets older, he finds himself struggling with the expectations his family has set up for him, and he starts to question the life that has been set out for him. instead of following his father's path, he falls in love with a young woman named Akosua, and together they choose to leave their families behind. They settle in a distant village, hoping to build a life away from the pressures that once surrounded them. Still, the effects of slavery and the ongoing conflicts between nearby groups continue to influence their future and the lives of the generations that come after them.

James, Quey's son, returns to Asante land where since childhood, he has been promised to marry the daughter of the Fante chief, Amma. James longs to run away and marry Akosua Mensah, a farmer woman. With help from Effia, James runs away from Amma and lives among the Efutu people until they are raided and killed by the Asantes. He is saved by a man who recognizes him though and finds him familiar. James makes him promise to tell everyone he has died so he can reunite with Akosua.

Abena, James's daughter, only knows her father as a rural farmer called Unlucky for his inability to grow crops. At twenty-five she is still unmarried, while her childhood best friend, Ohene, promises to marry her after his next successful season. The village elders discover they are having an affair and tells them that if Abena conceives a child or the famine lasts more than seven years Abena will be cast out. In the sixth year, Ohene successfully pioneers the introduction of cocoa plants. Rather than marry Abena he reveals that he promised to marry the daughter of the farmer who gave him the seeds. Abena, now pregnant, decides to leave her village rather than wait for Ohene to marry her.

Akua grows up among white missionaries after her mother dies early in her childhood. When an Asante man, Asamoah, proposes, she accepts and marries him to escape the missionary. She is traumatized by both her mother's death and by seeing her fellow villagers burn a white traveler alive. Before the birth of her third child, Akua begins to have nightmares about a woman on fire with burning children. Her nightmares cause her to avoid sleep and enter a trance-like state while awake, and as a result her mother-in-law locks her in the hut while her husband goes to fight in the war against them against the British. Asamoah returns missing one leg, in time for the birth of their son, Yaw. The nightmares continue to haunt Akua and, while sleepwalking during a trance at night, she kills her daughters by setting a fire that consumes them. Her husband is able to save Yaw and successfully prevent Akua from being burned herself by the townspeople.

Yaw grows up to be a schoolteacher who is highly educated but angry about his facial burn scars. His friends encourage him to marry even though he is near the age of fifty, as his self-consciousness has kept him alone until that point. After his friends go through a difficult pregnancy, he decides to take on a house girl, Esther. The two of them speak Twi together; Esther is unfazed by Yaw's anger and asks him constant questions about his way of life, and he realizes he loves her. To please Esther, he goes to see his mother, now known as the Crazy Woman, for the first time in over forty years in Edweso where they reconcile, and she tells him that there is evil in their line and that she regrets causing the fire that burned him.

Marjorie, Yaw's daughter, grows up in Alabama, which she hates, and spends summers in Ghana visiting her grandmother, who has moved from Edweso to the Gold Coast. In her mostly-white high school she struggles to fit in as the black students mock her for acting white and the white students don't want to have anything to do with her. She feels left out as although she is black, she doesn't identify with the African American teenagers. While reading in the library she meets a German-born army brat, Graham, and develops a crush on him hoping he will ask her to prom. Instead, his father and the school ban them from attending together and he instead goes with a white girl. She reads a poem about her Ghanaian origin and ancestors during an African American cultural day at her high school, which her father attends. Her grandmother dies shortly after, before Marjorie is able to make it back to Ghana.

=== Esi's line ===
Esi is the beloved and beautiful daughter of a Big Man and his wife, Maame. Her father is a renowned and successful warrior and he eventually captures a slave who asks Esi to send a message to her father about where she is. Esi complies out of pity as her mother was formerly enslaved. As a result her village is raided and her father and mother are killed. Before she leaves Esi learns that her mother, while she was enslaved, had a child before her, then set a fire and left the baby with Babaa. Esi is then captured and imprisoned in the dungeon of the Cape Coast Castle where she is raped by a drunken merchant before being sent to North America. She is unable to retrieve the stone she buried for safety in the depths of the dungeon.

Esi's daughter, Ness, is raised in the American South. Her mother teaches her some Twi but she and her mother are eventually beaten for it and separated. In her new, more lenient plantation, Ness is forbidden from becoming a house slave because of the deep scars on her back. Before arriving at the plantation Ness is forcibly married by her master to Sam, a Yoruba man and fellow slave on the same plantation. Although he speaks no English, they eventually come to love one another and have a child, whom she names Kojo. After a woman hears her speaking Twi, Ness is offered the opportunity to escape north. Ness, the woman, Sam, and Kojo escape but in an effort to protect her son, she and her husband allow themselves to be caught and then claim their child died, allowing the woman to escape with Kojo. Ness is severely whipped, causing her brutal scars, and forced to watch as Sam is hanged.

Kojo is raised in Baltimore where he goes by the name Jo Freeman and marries a freeborn black woman Anna. Kojo works on the ships in the Baltimore Harbor while Anna cleans for a white family, and the entire family lives with Ma, the woman who helped Kojo escape when he was a baby. When Anna is pregnant with their eighth child, the Fugitive Slave Act of 1850 is passed. Jo is warned that he should go further North but he decides to stay. The white family Anna works for helps Kojo and Ma forge papers saying they were born free, but Kojo still worries he or his family will be kidnapped. His oldest daughter marries the pastor's son, and soon after, Anna disappears while pregnant. Kojo looks for her for weeks but is unable to find her, only hearing that a white man asked her to enter a carriage with him at the last sighting. The kidnapping destroys Jo's family.

H, the last son born to Anna and Kojo, is freed during the Reconstruction era, and has never known his parents, with Anna dying shortly after childbirth. Sometime after, as an adult man, he is arrested and wrongly accused of assaulting a white woman. Unable to pay the ten-dollar fine he is sentenced to work in a coal mine for ten years. One day a white convict is assigned as his partner and he is unable to shovel any coal, so H shovels the twelve-ton daily quota for the both of them with two hands simultaneously, earning him the nickname "Two-Shovel H". When H is released from his sentence he settles in Pratt City in Birmingham, Alabama, made up of other ex-convicts both black and white, and works in the coal mine as a free agent. Unable to read or write, he asks a friend's son to write a letter to his ex-girlfriend Ethe, whom he cheated on shortly before being arrested. She eventually comes to join him.

H's daughter Willie marries Robert, her childhood sweetheart who is light-skinned with light eyes, and they have a son named Carson. After her parents die Robert suggests they move away and Willie asks that they go to Harlem as she wants to start a career as a singer. As they look for work Willie realizes that her too dark skin will prevent her from being a professional singer while Robert is able to pass for white. The two grow farther apart as Robert finds a job in white Manhattan while Willie cleans bars in Harlem. They begin keeping secrets from one another, and Robert returns home less and less. One night, Willie sees Robert vomiting in the men's bathroom during her job at a bar, and Robert's white co-workers find out their relationship. One of the co-workers have the two of them touch each other as he sexually pleasures himself, and then fires Robert. That night, Robert leaves her. Willie eventually begins a new relationship with Eli and has a daughter, Josephine. One day, when Carson is ten, Willie sees Robert in Manhattan with a white wife and their white child. The two make eye contact, and Willie suddenly realizes that she forgives Robert. Her anger, sadness, confusion and loss subside, and she finds her voice again.

Carson, who as an adult goes by the name Sonny, tries to find meaning in marching for civil rights and working for the NAACP but instead becomes demoralized by his work. Like his own father he becomes an absentee parent to three children by three different women, often dodging their requests for alimony. He meets a young singer named Amani and after she introduces him to drugs he becomes addicted to heroin as well. He spends all of his money on drugs and realizes he never loved Amani, but only wanted her. When Willie finally reveals details about his father and offers him a choice between her money or getting clean he chooses to stay with his mother and get clean.

Sonny and Amani's son Marcus goes on to become an academic at Stanford University. At a party near campus, he meets Marjorie, also a graduate student at Stanford, and the two form an intimate bond. The two of them go to Pratt City so Marcus can research his African American history thesis, and Marcus realizes there is nothing there for him; Marjorie's parents have also both died. Marjorie suggests that they go to Ghana and while they are there visiting the villages of Marjorie's grandmother, they go to the Cape Coast Castle which Marjorie has never visited. While seeing the "Door of No Return" in the slave dungeon, Marcus has a panic attack and flees through the door to the beach. He and Marjorie swim in the water where she gives him Effia's stone, which has been passed to her through the generations, and which, unbeknownst to both of them, was given to Effia by their mutual ancestor, Maame. Esi's stone remains unrecovered, buried in the dungeons of the Castle.

=== Descendants of Maame ===
Descendants of Maame

Baaba (Fante)	Cobbe Otcher (Fante)	Maame (Asante)	Kwame "Big Man" Asare (Asante)
Osei Bonsu	Fiifi Otcher	Effia Otcher	James Collins	Esi	Anonymous merchant
Nana Yaa (Asante)	Quey Collins	"Ma" Aku	Goodness ("Ness")	Sam	Anonymous slave	TimTam
Amma Atta	James ("Unlucky")	Akosua Mensah	Kojo ("Jo")	Anna	Pinky
Abena	Ohene Nyarko	Ethe	H	Children "A"–"G"
Akua	Asamoah Agyekum	Robert Clifton	Willie	Eli	Hazel
Abee & Ama	Esther	Yaw	Josephine
Angela	Lucille
Carson ("Sonny")
Rhonda	Amani Zulema
Etta	unnamed girl	unnamed girl
Marjorie	Marcus

- Bold names are chapter titles.
- Dashed lines represent marriages.
- Dotted lines represent adoptions, extra-marital relationships, and non-consensual relationships.
- Solid lines represent descendants.

== Major themes ==
The novel touches on several notable historical events, from the introduction of cacao as a crop in Ghana and the Anglo-Asante wars in Ghana to slavery, segregation, the convict leasing system, the Great Migration, and the jazz age in Harlem in America. Because of the novel's scope, which covers several hundred years of history and fourteen characters, it has been described as "a novel in short stories" where "each chapter is forced to stand on its own."

In addition to the above historical events, this novel explores several literary themes and motifs, including the 'upstairs, downstairs' trope. This effect is first demonstrated by Effia literally living above her half-sister Esi, unaware of the atrocities occurring in the basement of the Cape Coast castle. Then themes of generational trauma and guilt follow these 2 lineages as Esi's lineage has to cope with the impacts of slavery and structural racism in the US and Effia's line copes with the limited knowledge of the role their family played in the Transatlantic Slave Trade.

== Development history ==
In the summer of 2009, following her sophomore year at Stanford University, Gyasi took a trip to Ghana sponsored by a research grant. Although Gyasi was born in Ghana, she moved to the United States as an infant, and this was her first trip back. On a friend's prompting, they visited the Cape Coast Castle, where she found her inspiration in the contrast between the luxurious upper levels (for colonists and their local families) and the misery of the dungeons below, where slaves were kept. She relates: "I just found it really interesting to think about how there were people walking around upstairs who were unaware of what was to become of the people living downstairs."

Gyasi says the family tree came first; further, each chapter, which follows one descendant, is tied to a significant historical event. Gyasi described the research as "wide but shallow." The Door of No Return by British historian William St Clair helped to form the descriptions of life in and around the Castle in the first few chapters. One of the final chapters, entitled "Marjorie", is inspired by Gyasi's experiences as part of an immigrant family living in Alabama.

... I think I was kind of constantly interacting, I guess, with really what the legacy of slavery is. You know, coming from a country, Ghana, that had a role in slavery, and then ending up in a place where slavery is still so strongly felt institutionally, as racism is still so strongly felt. The irony of that wasn't lost on me. And I think, had I not grown up in Alabama, I don't know that I would have ever written this book.

— Yaa Gyasi, 2016 interview with Scott Simon

=== Publication history ===
- — (2016). Homegoing (1st hardcover ed.). New York: Knopf. ISBN 978-1-10194-713-5.
- — (2016). Homegoing (ebook ed.). New York: Knopf. ISBN 978-1-10194-714-2.
- — (2016). Homegoing (open market ed.). New York: Knopf. ISBN 978-0-45149-383-5.
- — (2016). Homegoing (1st UK hardcover ed.). London: Viking. ISBN 978-0-24124-272-8.
- — (2017). Weg Naar Huis. Translated by Hoekmeijer, Nicolette (1st Dutch ed.). Amsterdam: De Bezige Bij. ISBN 978-9-02349-995-4.

== Reception ==
Before the official publication in June 2016, Time's Sarah Begley called it "one of the summer’s most-anticipated novels".

The New York Times Book Review listed it as an Editor's Choice, writing, "This wonderful debut by a Ghanaian-American novelist follows the shifting fortunes of the progeny of two half-sisters, unknown to each other, in West Africa and America." Jennifer Maloney of The Wall Street Journal noted the author received an advance of more than US$1,000,000 and praised the plot as "flecked with magic, evoking folk tales passed down from parent to child", also noting the novel has "structural and thematic similarities to Alex Haley's Pulitzer Prize-winning 1976 book, Roots". Christian Lorentzen of New York Magazine said, "Each chapter is tightly plotted, and there are suspenseful, even spectacular climaxes." Anita Felicelli of the San Francisco Chronicle said that Gyasi is "a young writer whose stellar instincts, sturdy craftsmanship and penetrating wisdom seem likely to continue apace — much to our good fortune as readers". In a positive review for The Washington Post, Ron Charles said, "[The] structure — essentially a novel in linked stories — places extraordinary demands on Gyasi. Each chapter must immediately introduce a new setting and new characters making fresh claims on our engagement...But the speed with which Gyasi sweeps across the decades isn't confusing so much as dazzling, creating a kind of time-elapsed photo of black lives in America and in the motherland."

Isabel Wilkerson of The New York Times described her as "a stirringly gifted young writer". Wilkerson also commented on the difference between the lyrical language of the West African passages and the "coarser language and surface descriptions of life in America". Wilkerson expressed some disappointment: "It is dispiriting to encounter such a worn-out cliché — that African-Americans are hostile to reading and education — in a work of such beauty." Steph Cha, writing for the Los Angeles Times, notes "the characters are, by necessity, representatives for entire eras of African and black American history [which] means some of them embody a few shortcuts" in advancing the narrative and themes, but overall, "the sum of Homegoing's parts is remarkable, a panoramic portrait of the slave trade and its reverberations." Laura Miller, writing for The New Yorker, said that while parts of Homegoing show "the unmistakable touch of a gifted writer, [the novel] is a specimen of what such a writer can do when she bites off more than she is ready to chew," noting the "form [of the novel] would daunt a far more practiced novelist" as the form, composed of short stories linked by ancestors and descendants, "[isn't] the ideal way to deliver the amount of exposition that historical fiction requires."

Maureen Corrigan, reviewing for NPR noted the plot was "pretty formulaic" and it "would have been a stronger novel if it had ended sooner," but "the feel of her novel is mostly sophisticated," and she concluded that "so many moments earlier on in this strong debut novel linger." Michiko Kakutani noted in her New York Times review the novel "often feels deliberate and earthbound: The reader is aware, especially in the American chapters, that significant historical events and issues ... have been shoehorned into the narrative, and that characters have been made to trudge through experiences ... meant, in some way, to be representative," but it also "makes us experience the horrors of slavery on an intimate, personal level; by its conclusion, the characters' tales of loss and resilience have acquired an inexorable and cumulative emotional weight." In a similarly mixed review, Kirkus Reviews said the novel "lacks the sweep that its premise implies, though: while the characters share a bloodline, and a gold-flecked stone appears throughout the book as a symbolic connector, the novel is more a well-made linked story collection than a complex epic." Though, the review concluded positively: "A promising debut that’s awake to emotional, political, and cultural tensions across time and continents." Other reviewers were not as critical of the novel's structure. Jean Zimmerman, also writing for NPR, praised the novel as "a remarkable achievement," saying the "narrative [...] is earnest, well-crafted yet not overly self-conscious, marvelous without being precious."

Leilani Clark at KQED Arts wrote: "Until every American embarks on a major soul-searching about the venal, sordid racial history of the United States, and their own position in relation to it, the bloodshed, tears, and anger will keep on. Let Homegoing be an inspiration to begin that process."

In 2019, the book was listed in Paste as the third-greatest novel of the 2010s.

On November 5, 2019, the BBC News listed Homegoing on its list of the 100 most influential novels.

== Awards and nominations ==
Ta-Nehisi Coates selected Homegoing for the National Book Foundation's 2016 "5 Under 35" award, announced in September 2016. Homegoing was shortlisted for the 2016 Center for Fiction First Novel Prize, which eventually went to The Castle Cross the Magnet Carter by Kia Corthron.

The novel was subsequently awarded the John Leonard Award for publishing year 2016 by the National Book Critics Circle for outstanding debut novel in January 2017. In February 2017, Swansea University announced Homegoing had made the longlist for the 2017 Dylan Thomas Prize for the best published literary work in the English language written by an author aged 39 or younger. The novel was the runner-up for the Dayton Literary Peace Prize for Fiction in 2017, a nominee for the Andrew Carnegie Medal for Excellence in Fiction, and a nominee for the International Dublin Literary Award in 2018.
