= Samina Ali =

American author and activist

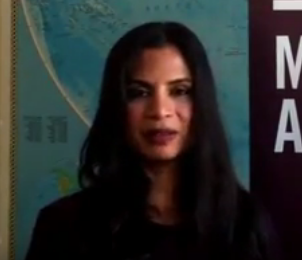
- Born: Hyderabad, India
- Education: University of Minnesota; University of Oregon
- Occupation: Writer
- Writing career
- Language: English
- Genre: Fiction
- Notable work: Madras on Rainy Days
- Notable awards: 2015 Prix du Premier Roman Etranger Award
- Website: saminaali.net

Samina Ali is an American author, activist for Muslim women’s rights, curator, and public speaker born in India. Her debut novel, Madras on Rainy Days, won the Prix du Premier Roman Etranger award from France and was a finalist for the PEN/Hemingway Award in Fiction. She is the curator of the global exhibition Muslima: Muslim Women’s Art & Voices (2013) Ali’s memoir, Pieces You’ll Never Get Back (2025), chronicles her near-death experience following childbirth and her subsequent recovery.

== Career ==
Ali’s debut novel, Madras on Rainy Days, was published by Farrar, Straus and Giroux in 2004. The book received critical acclaim, being awarded the Prix Premier Roman Étranger in France and recognized as a Top Debut of the Year by Poets & Writers Magazine. It was also a finalist for the PEN/Hemingway Award and the California Book Reviewers Award.

She has served as the curator of Muslima: Muslim Women’s Art and Voices, a global, virtual exhibition for the International Museum of Women (IMOW), now part of Global Fund for Women. In 2021, Global Fund for Women partnered with The Feminist Institute to preserve this digital exhibition.

She is the co-founder of American Muslim feminist organization Daughters of Hajar. The group's march for gender equality at a mosque in Morgantown, West Virginia, was documented in the PBS film The Mosque in Morgantown (2009).

In 2017, she delivered a Tedx talk, What does the Quran really say about a Muslim woman's hijab? at the University of Nevada, defining the word "hijab" as it's used in the Quran. By 2020, the video had been viewed more than 8 million times.

She has represented the United States as a cultural ambassador for the U.S. State Department in several European countries. In 2017, she was a featured speaker at the Nobel Women’s Initiative conference, an international gathering founded by women Nobel Peace Prize laureates.

She was a blogger for HuffPost and The Daily Beast. Her publication include The New York Times, San Francisco Chronicle, Huffington Post, The Daily Beast, and Child magazine. Her essay “Labor of Love” was included in the anthology All the Women in My Family Sing: Essays on Equality, Justice, and Freedom (2018).

== Bibliography ==
- Madras on Rainy Days, Farrar, Straus and Giroux, 2004, ISBN 9780374195625

== Honors and awards ==
In 2004, Samina received the Rona Jaffe Foundation Writers' Award in fiction. One year later, Madras on Rainy Days was awarded the Prix du Premier Roman Etranger award in 2005, and was a finalist for the PEN/Hemingway Award in fiction.

In July 2004, Madras on Rainy Days was chosen as a best debut novel of the year by Poets & Writers magazine, and she was featured on the cover in July/August 2004 issue.
