= Loyd Little =

American writer (1940–2020)

Loyd Harry Little (12 September 1940 – 17 October 2020) was an American writer and journalist, best known for his debut novel Parthian Shot (1975) that won the inaugural Hemingway Foundation/PEN Award in 1976. A graduate of the University of North Carolina-Chapel Hill, he joined the Green Berets in 1962 and served in the Vietnam War. He later taught fiction writing at University of North Carolina. Some of his other notable works are In the Village of the Man (1988) and Roll On Sugaree (2013).
