= David Williamson Jr. =

American aerospace administrator (1929 – 1992)

- Born: 1929; Istanbul, Turkey
- Died: October 2, 1992 (aged 62–63); Bethesda, Maryland
- Education: Princeton University, BA (1956)
- Employers: NASA; Georgetown University
- Relatives: Charlotte Bacon (niece)
- Awards: NASA Exceptional Service Medal; NASA Distinguished Service Medal; William A. Jump Memorial Award

David Williamson Jr. (1929 – October 8, 1992) was an American aerospace administrator and Korean War veteran. He was among the first employees of NASA, where he was one of its most decorated civilian employees.

== Early life and education ==
Williamson was born in Istanbul, where is father was an American diplomat. He also spent a portion of his childhood growing up in Switzerland and England, due to his father's foreign service. He also grew up in Maryland, near Washington, D.C., where his father was working with the government.

For high school, Williamson attended the boarding school St. Andrew's School, in Middletown, Delaware, which he graduated from in 1947. He then attended Princeton University, where he was on the varsity fencing team. Before he could graduate, he enlisted in the United States Army. He rose to a lieutenant of artillery in the Korean War. When his service completed in 1955, he returned to Princeton, New Jersey, where he earned his Bachelor of Arts in History. He graduated cum laude in 1956.

== Career ==
Upon graduating, Williamson became one of the first employees at NASA in 1959. He spent most of his career in the Office of Tracking and Data Acquisition, where he was a policy advisor and special projects administrator focused on national security matters.

Between 1967 and 1972, Williamson was responsible for coordinating Apollo photographic experiment plans with the United States Intelligence Community and managing the process that would govern review and release of the resulting imagery. The unmanned orbital photography of Earth for civilian interests conflicted with the National Reconnaissance Office directives, which Williamson would sometimes manage by avoiding photographing certain geographic areas. Williamson was among the few NASA administrators who, in 1977, recommended NASA take no steps to investigate unidentified flying objects for the potential for extraterrestrial life.

He retired from NASA in 1982 for health reasons, taking a fellowship at Georgetown University at the Center for Strategic and International Studies. He was recalled to serve at NASA after the Space Shuttle Challenger disaster, retiring again in 1990, as one of its most decorated civilians.

During his tenure at NASA, he was awarded three NASA Exceptional Service Medals, two NASA Distinguished Service Medals, and a William A. Jump Memorial Award, awarded for outstanding service to federal employees in public administration.

== Publications ==
- Williamson, David Jr. (1986). The American Policy after Crisis: Cohesion or Collapse?. Washington, DC: Center for Strategic and International Studies, Georgetown University.

== Personal life and family ==
Williamson met his wife Ruth while he was stationed in El Paso, Texas. He was diagnosed with cancer in 1980. He died from a fall in October 1992. His niece, Charlotte Bacon, is an author.
