= A Prayer for Travelers =

2019 novel by Ruchika Tomar

- Author: Ruchika Tomar
- Language: English
- Genre: Literary fiction
- Publisher: Riverhead Books
- Publication date: July 9, 2019
- Publication place: United States
- Pages: 352
- Awards: PEN/Hemingway (2020)
- ISBN: 9780525537038

A Prayer for Travelers is the debut novel of American writer Ruchika Tomar, published in 2019 by Riverhead Books. The novel won the 2020 PEN/Hemingway Award.

It is a mystery and coming-of-age story, revolving around the friendship between two young women, Cale and Penny, who live in a small town near the California–Nevada border, and the sudden disappearance of one of them.

== Reception ==
Adrienne Gaffney in the San Francisco Chronicle described the book as "a portrait of two young women coming of age in a world full of hard men [...] where the brutality of the landscape is matched by the circumstances that her characters live in". Chris Vola on PopMatters gave a rating of 8/10 to the book, highlighting "the visual world that Tomar conjures, a marvelously drawn background of creosote and rabbitbrush, [...] with enough personality to rival any of the ragged souls who populate [...] gas stations, seedy bars, and hotel rooms." while at the same time suggesting that "ome of Tomar’s stylistic choices leave something to be desired".

The judges of PEN/Hemingway, awarding the book as best debut novel in 2020, called it "a remarkable piece of writing, astute in style and structure and also in the story that it tells."
