= Transcendent Kingdom =

2020 novel by Yaa Gyasi

- Cover of first edition
- Author: Yaa Gyasi
- Audio read by: Bahni Turpin
- Language: English
- Publisher: Alfred A. Knopf
- Publication date: September 1, 2020
- Publication place: United States
- Media type: Print (hardcover and paperback), e-book, audio
- Pages: 288
- ISBN: 978-0-525-65818-4 (hardcover)
- OCLC: 1119065931
- Dewey Decimal: 813/.6
- LC Class: PS3607.Y37 T73 2020

Transcendent Kingdom is the second novel by Ghanaian American author Yaa Gyasi, published in 2020 by Alfred A. Knopf. Transcendent Kingdom was found by Literary Hub to have made 17 lists of the best books of 2020.

== Summary ==
The novel follows 28-year-old Gifty, a PhD candidate in neuroscience in her fifth year at Stanford University, and her Ghanaian-American mother, who is suffering from a deep depression.

While experimenting on lab mice for her research, Gifty gets a call that her mother is not feeling well. She sends for her mother so she can take care of her and is overwhelmed by the remembrance of the first time her mother fell into a similar depression, when Gifty was 11.

Gifty's mother and her father, affectionately nick-named The Chin-chin man, were Ghanaians who met and married late. They had a brilliant son, Nana, and after his birth Gifty's mother, seeking a better life for her child, relocated to Huntsville, Alabama where a cousin of hers was studying. Gifty's mother was forced to take menial jobs, eventually become a caretaker to abusive and racist elderly patients. Gifty's father eventually relocated to America to be with his family but was only able to find unstable work as a janitor.

Gifty was born a few years later, and was an unwanted pregnancy.

The family was anchored around Nana's prodigious gifts as an athlete and their mother's fervent religious zeal which Gifty inherited. Never settling in Alabama, The Chin-chin man eventually returned to Ghana for what was initially supposed to be a short trip, never to return. Shaken by his father's abandonment, Nana quit soccer, a sport which he had been proficient in, and in high school joined basketball. After injuring his ankle in a low-stakes game Nana was prescribed opioids and quickly became addicted, seeking out heroin to allay his cravings. When Gifty is 11 her brother dies of an overdose and her mother falls into a deep depression, taking to her bed and unable to care for herself. After she tried to commit suicide Gifty is forced to seek help and is sent to Ghana while her mother recovers, staying with her maternal aunt and briefly reuniting with her estranged father.

Nana's death and Gifty's mother's attempted suicide push Gifty away from religion. A bright scholar, she attends elite universities and chooses a path in neuroscience studying addictive behavior. Her past and her continued belief in God mark her as an outsider and she has trouble opening herself up emotionally. In the present, unable to help her mother she finally reaches out to a colleague of hers who supports Gifty as she attempts to help her mother.

In an unspecified future time, after Gifty's mother has died of natural causes, a now married Gifty, who is flourishing as a scientist and runs her own lab, regularly goes to a church to sit in silence.

== Reception ==
The Washington Post named it "a book of blazing brilliance". USA Today called it "stealthily devastating" while Vox gave it 3.5 out of 5 stars. The novel also received positive reviews from The New York Times Book Review, The New Yorker, The Boston Globe, The Guardian, Chicago Review of Books, and The New Republic.

== Awards and nominations ==
Awards for Transcendent Kingdom
| Year | Award | Cat | Result | Ref. |
|---|---|---|---|---|
| 2020 | Prix Médicis | Prix Médicis étranger | Longlisted | |
| 2021 | Andrew Carnegie Medal for Excellence | Fiction | Longlisted | |
| 2021 | Aspen Words Literary Prize | — | Longlisted | |
| 2021 | Women's Prize for Fiction | — | Shortlisted | |

== "Inscape" ==
In 2015, in Guernica magazine, Gyasi published a short story titled "Inscape;" the story features some of the characters in Transcendent Kingdom in somewhat different situations. In "Inscape" Gifty is a forty-one-year-old professor of English studying Gerard Manley Hopkins instead of a twenty-six-year-old neuroscientist, her mother's mental illness is more severe, Gifty's attraction to her friend Anne is more intimate ("My whole body ached at the mention of her name"), and she has no brother.
