= Arna Bontemps Hemenway =

American author

Arna Bontemps Hemenway is an American author and professor most known for his book Elegy on Kinderklavier, which won the PEN/Hemingway Prize, was a finalist for the Barnes and Noble Discover Award, and was long-listed for the Frank O'Connor International Short Story Prize. Today, he is an associate professor of creative writing at Baylor University. He is a graduate of the Iowa Writers' Workshop.

== Awards ==
- PEN/Hemingway Prize
- Finalist for the Barnes and Noble Discover Award
- Long-listed for the Frank O'Connor International Short Story Prize

== Publications ==
=== Books ===
- Elegy on Kinderklavier
- "The Fugue" in Best American Short Stories 2015

=== Stories ===
- “Wolves of Karelia”
- "The IED"
- "Helping"
- "The Fugue"
- "Asleep in the Monastery"
- "A Self-Made Man"
- "A Life"
- "In the Mosque of Imam Alwani"
- "Elegy on Kinderklavier"
- "Behind the Mountains Are More Mountains"
- "Fetal Anatomy Assessment"
- "This Life, Unbidden"
- "The Third Thing That Killed Cat Hoseman"
