= A Private State =

1997 collection of short stories by Charlotte Bacon

- First edition
- Author: Charlotte Bacon
- Language: English
- Publication date: 1997

A Private State (1997) is a collection of short stories by Charlotte Bacon. It won the Ernest Hemingway Foundation/PEN Award (1998), and the Associated Writing Programs Award for Short Fiction (1996). A story from the collection "Live Free or Die", won the 1996 Pirate's Alley Faulkner Society Award for Best Short Story.

== Reception ==
In the New York Times Book Review, Lisa Zeidner, a professor of English at Rutgers University, wrote, "Bacon is attempting to produce exciting fiction about essentially unexciting and predictable lives -- a surprisingly difficult task. It's hard to get the balance right between dailiness and drama. Readers may occasionally wish that these women and Bacon's stories took more chances. She often succeeds."

== Editions ==
- Charlette Bacon. A Private State, University of Massachusetts Press, 1997. ISBN 1-55849-114-7
