= Charlotte Bacon (author) =

American author and educator (1965)

- Born: 1965 (age 60–61); New York
- Education: Harvard College, BA (1988); Columbia Graduate School of Arts and Sciences, MFA (1994); University of New Hampshire, EMT (1994)
- Occupation: Associate professor
- Children: 3
- Relatives: David Williamson Jr. (uncle)
- Writing career
- Notable work: A Private State
- Notable awards: Guggenheim Fellowship; 2001 Fiction

Charlotte Bacon (born 1965) is an American author, a professor of English, and associate provost at Dartmouth College. She is the author of the short story collection A Private State, which won the Ernest Hemingway Foundation/PEN Award in 1998 and the Associated Writing Programs Award for Short Fiction in 1996. Bacon was awarded a Guggenheim Fellowship in 2001 for Fiction.

== Early life and education ==
Bacon was born in New York to James E. Bacon, former executive vice president of U.S. Trust, and Edith née Williamson. Bacon's maternal uncle David Williamson Jr. was a founding father of NASA. Her family relocated to Milton, Massachusetts, where she attended Milton Academy, a college-preparatory school. She graduated in 1983.

She then attended Harvard College, where she earned a Bachelor of Arts in History and Literature. She graduated cum laude in 1988. After she graduated, she obtained a Master of Fine Arts in Writing at Columbia Graduate School of Arts and Sciences in 1994.

== Career ==
Upon graduating, Bacon joined Phillips Exeter Academy, in Exeter, New Hampshire, where she was a writer-in-residence until 1995. While there, Bacon found herself bored, saying they "had too much time to write." She entered the emergency medical technician (EMT) program at University of New Hampshire (UNH) and served as an EMT. This experience later became the basis of Live Free or Die, a short story that won the 1996 Pirate's Alley William Faulkner Prize for best short story. It was later the first short story in her book A Private State, which won two awards.

Bacon then relocated to Farmington, Connecticut, where she was an English and creative writing teacher at Miss Porter's School, a girls school. In 1998, she joined UNH as an associate professor where she taught fiction writing. During this time, she traveled to India, and wrote her second novel, There Is Room For You, published in 2004. She then relocated to Bali to develop a school for sustainability, staying there until 2009. In 2011, Bacon wrote an essay about a trip to Chimi Lhakhang, a fertility temple in Bhutan, which was later read on a New York Times podcast by actress Mira Sorvino. Afterward, she moved to Portland, Maine, where she was the executive director of the Maine Wabanaki-State Truth and Reconciliation Commission.

In 2017, Bacon joined Dartmouth College working in research development. In 2018, she was the associate director of humanities grant support. As of 2026, she is an associate provost.

== Selected publications ==
- Bacon, Charlotte (1997). Private State. Amherst, Massachusetts: University of Massachusetts Press. ISBN 9781558491144.
- Bacon, Charlotte (2000). Lost Geography. New York: Farrar, Straus, Giroux. ISBN 978-0-374-19160-3.
- Bacon, Charlotte (2004). There Is Room for You. New York: Farrar, Straus and Giroux. ISBN 0-374-28185-8.
- Bacon, Charlotte (December 12, 2011). "A Forgotten Prayer, Answered". The New York Times.

== Awards ==
- Associated Writing Programs Award for Short Fiction, 1996, for Private State
- Hemingway Foundation/PEN Award, 1998, for Private State
- Guggenheim Fellowship, 2001, Fiction

== Personal life ==
Bacon met her husband while they were teaching at Miss Porter's School. They have three children. Bacon has discussed her struggles with infertility and miscarriage, which led her to a fertility temple in Bhutan. She wrote an essay about her experiences in 2011, which was published in The New York Times.
