= Douglas Trevor =

American author and academic (born 1969)

- Born: Douglas Trevor; 1969 (age 56–57); Pasadena, California, U.S.
- Occupations: Novelist, Short-story writer
- Children: 2
- Writing career
- Period: 1991—present
- Notable works: The Thin Tear in the Fabric of Space (2005); The Poetics of Melancholy in Early Modern England (2004)

Douglas Trevor (born 1969) is an American author and academic. His first book was a collection of stories entitled The Thin Tear in the Fabric of Space (2005). This was followed by The Poetics of Melancholy in Early Modern England (2004), the novel Girls I Know (2013), and the short story collection The Book of Wonders. He has won several awards for his writing. Since 2007 and as of March 2006, he teaches in the English Department of the University of Michigan.

== Early life and education ==
Douglas Trevor was born 1969 in Pasadena, California. He moved with mother, father, and sister, Jolee, to Denver, Colorado at the age of three.

He attended high school at the Kent Denver School and from there went to Princeton University, where he studied Comparative Literature and Creative Writing. In the Princeton Creative Writing Program, Trevor worked with Joyce Carol Oates, Russell Banks, and Toni Morrison. He graduated in 1992.

Trevor went to France on a Rotary Fellowship to study the essayist Michel de Montaigne at the Université de Tours. After completing a year of study, he matriculated to Harvard University, where he began work on an English PhD, completing it in 1999.

== Career ==
=== Academia ===
After completing his PhD, Trevor took an assistant professorship in the English Department at the University of Iowa. He received tenure in 2005. While at Iowa, Trevor also served for a time as the fiction editor of The Iowa Review (2000–2004).

In 2007 he took a tenured position at the University of Michigan, teaching in the English Department and Creative Writing Program.

As of March 2026, he is a professor at the University of Michigan, teaching courses on Shakespeare.

=== Writing ===
Trevor's first published work in a national distributed journal was in The Ontario Review, when he was 24. For the next decade, he published short stories in journals and magazines such as Glimmer Train, The Paris Review, Epoch (American magazine), The New England Review, and The Black Warrior Review.

In 2004, his first book appeared. The Poetics of Melancholy in Early Modern England was a study of how writers such as John Donne, Edmund Spenser, and John Milton utilized the term melancholic to enhance their reputations as learned writers. In 2005, Trevor published his first collection of stories, The Thin Tear in the Fabric of Space. Each of these nine stories circles around a different experience of grief following the death of a loved one. The collection is dedicated to the writer's sister, Jolee, who died unexpectedly in 1998.

As a scholar of sixteenth- and seventeenth-century English literature, Trevor has published widely on writers ranging from Thomas More to Milton, and was the co-editor (with Carla Mazzio) of Historicism, Psychoanalysis, and Early Modern Culture (2000).

Following the publication of Girls I Know, Trevor returned to short fiction, publishing several stories in journals such as Ploughshares Solos and The Iowa Review. In 2017, Trevor's second collection of stories, The Book of Wonders, appeared.

== Awards and honors ==
Trevor received the Iowa Short Fiction Award and was a finalist for the Hemingway Foundation/PEN Award for his first book, a collection of stories entitled The Thin Tear in the Fabric of Space (2005).

Other recognition and awards include:

- The Balcones Fiction Prize (for Girls I Know, 2013)
- New Letters Readers Award (for "Slugger and the Fat Man," 2013)
- Distinguished Visiting Author, University Liggett School (2013)
- Distinguished Alumni Award, Kent Denver School (2013)
- Fellow, Institute for the Humanities, University of Michigan (2012–2013)
- LSA Excellence in Education Award, University of Michigan (2011)
- Theodore Morrison Fellow in Fiction, Bread Loaf Writers' Conference (2007)
- Writer-in-Residence, the Ucross Foundation, Clearmont, Wyoming (2007, 2012)
- Finalist, Hemingway Foundation/PEN Award for First Fiction for The Thin Tear in the Fabric of Space (2006)
- Anthologized, "Girls I Know," in The O. Henry Prize Stories 2006
- Anthologized, "Girls I Know," in The Best American Nonrequired Reading 2005
- John C. Gerber Teaching Prize, Department of English, University of Iowa (2005)
- Dean's Scholar, University of Iowa (2005–2006)
- Winner, The Iowa Short Fiction Award for The Thin Tear in the Fabric of Space (2005)
- David R. Sokolov Scholar in Fiction, Bread Loaf Writers' Conference (2003))
- Fellow, The Obermann Center for Advanced Studies, University of Iowa (2002)
- Winner, Chris O'Malley Prize in Short Fiction, Madison Review (1996)
- Finalist, Nelson Algren Award in Short Fiction, Chicago Tribune (1993)
- Finalist, Rhodes Scholarship (1992)
- Francis LeMoyne Page Senior Thesis Award, Princeton University; Phi Beta Kappa, Magna Cum Laude (1992)

== Selected works ==
=== Books ===
- The Book of Wonders. SixOneSeven Books 2017. ISBN 978-0-9848245-5-7
- Girls I Know. SixOneSeven Books 2013. ISBN 978-0-9831505-3-4
- The Thin Tear in the Fabric of Space. University of Iowa Press, 2005. ISBN 978-0-87745-950-7
- The Poetics of Melancholy in Early Modern England. 2004. ISBN 0-521-83469-4
- Historicism, Psychoanalysis, and Early Modern Culture. 2000. ISBN 0415920531

=== Short stories and novellas ===
- "The Detroit Frankfurt School Discussion Group" (2016, Ploughshares Solos)
- "Endymion" (2015, The Iowa Review)
- "Faucets" (2015, Midwestern Gothic)
- "The Program in Profound Thought" (2014, Notre Dame Review)
- "The Novelist and the Short Story Writer" (2014, The Minnesota Review)
- "Sonnet 126" (2013, Michigan Quarterly Review)
- "Slugger and the Fat Man" (2013, New Letters)
- "The Librarian" (2010, Michigan Quarterly Review)
- "The Thin Tear in the Fabric of Space" (2005, The Black Warrior Review)
- "The Surprising Weight of the Body's Organs" (2005, Epoch)
- "Girls I Know" (2004, Epoch)
- "The Fellowship of the Bereaved" (2003, Fugue)
- "Little Indian" (2003, Notre Dame Review)
- "The River" (2003, Glimmer Train)
- "Central Square" (2002, New England Review)
- "Saint Francis in Flint" (2001, The Paris Review)
- "The Whores in Tours" (1996, Madison Review)
- "A Pale Morning Done" (1995, River City: A Journal of Contemporary Culture)
- "Brother Love" (1994, Ontario Review)
- "The Box Chart" (1991, Nassau Literary Review)

== Personal life ==
The father of two, Trevor married in 2001 and divorced in 2010.
