= Madras on Rainy Days =

2004 novel by Samina Ali

- Madras on Rainy Days book cover
- Author: Samina Ali
- Language: English
- Genre: Fiction
- Publisher: Farrar, Straus and Giroux
- Publication date: 2004
- Pages: 309
- Awards: Hemingway Foundation/PEN Award
- ISBN: 9780374195625

Madras on Rainy Days is a 2004 novel written by Samina Ali.

== Overview ==
The books explores the life of Layla, a second generation Indian-American Muslim. Layla, torn between clashing identities, agrees to her parents' wish for her to leave America and submit to an arranged marriage, Layla enters into the closed world of tradition and ritual as the wedding preparations get underway in Hyderabad.

== Awards and recognition ==
In 2004, Madras on Rainy Days received the Rona Jaffe Foundation Award in Fiction. The book also was a finalist for the PEN/Hemingway Foundation Award in 2005, and was awarded the Prix Premier Roman Étranger 2005 Award in France.

In July 2004, the book was chosen as a best debut novel of the year by Poets & Writers magazine. The magazine featured Samina on the cover of its July/August 2004 issue.
