= Joan Chase =

American novelist (1936–2018)

- Born: November 26, 1936; Wooster, Ohio
- Died: April 17, 2018 (aged 81); Needham, Massachusetts
- Education: University of Maryland
- Occupation: Novelist
- Writing career
- Language: English
- Genre: novels

Joan Lucille Chase (November 26, 1936 – April 17, 2018) was an American novelist.

== Biography ==
Joan Strausbaugh was born in Wooster, Ohio in 1936; she and her family moved frequently due to her father's academic career. Joan graduated from the University of Maryland magna cum laude. From 1980 to 1984, she was an assistant director of the Ragdale Foundation. Chase also taught periodically at the Iowa Writers Workshop and Princeton University.

== Literary career ==
Chase's first novel, During the Reign of the Queen of Persia was published in 1983 when she was 47 years old. She won the PEN/Hemingway Prize for First Fiction by an American author. The book was republished in 2014 by New York Review Books with an introduction by Meghan O'Rourke.

== Personal life ==
In 1959, Strausbaugh married Richard Chase, an economist; they had two children together, a son and a daughter. Joan and Richard later divorced. She married Alexander Solomita in 2009.

Chase died on 17 April 2018 at a nursing home in Needham, Massachusetts, at the age of 81. She was suffering from both Parkinson's disease and Lewy Body disease.

== Awards ==
- 1983, PEN/Hemingway Prize
- 1984, Janet Heidinger Kafka Prize
- 1987, Whiting Award
- 1990, Guggenheim Fellowship

== Works ==
- During the Reign of the Queen of Persia. HarperCollins Publishers. 1983. ISBN 978-0-06-015136-2.
- The Evening Wolves. Ballantine Books. 1990. ISBN 978-0-345-36285-8.
- Bonneville Blue. Farrar, Straus, Giroux. 1991. ISBN 978-0-374-11539-5.
