= A Gentleman's Guide to Graceful Living =

2008 novel by Michael Dahlie

A Gentleman's Guide To Graceful Living
- Hardback cover (2008)
- Author: Michael Dahlie
- Language: English
- Genre: Novel
- Publisher: W. W. Norton
- Publication date: June 17, 2008
- Publication place: United States
- Media type: Print (hardback)
- Pages: 256 pp
- ISBN: 0-393-06617-7
- OCLC: 181139326
- Dewey Decimal: 813/.6 22
- LC Class: PS3604.A344 G46 2008

A Gentleman's Guide to Graceful Living is Michael Dahlie's debut novel. It was published in 2008.

== Plot introduction ==
The book is about a man, named Arthur Camden, who is the great-grandson of the owner of a club which is named Maidenhead Grange. The club is a beloved Catskills fly-fishing lounge. The lounge is home to the Hanover Street Fly Casters, a group that was founded in 1878 by 12 Manhattan financiers. Arthur burns Maidenhead Grange to the ground. He didn't burn down the club on purpose, he did it by accident. Arthur has also destroyed his marriage and an import-export business that is owned by his family.

== Reception ==
Publishers Weekly called the book an "entertaining debut", writing that "Dahlie's dry and understated portrayal of old upper-crust Manhattan is as crisp and authentic as a well-made gin and tonic; the various turns of plot are swift and precise".

Janet Maslin of The New York Times reviewed the book saying "A Gentleman's Guide to Graceful Living is perhaps too polite to create a big, vulgar epiphany for Arthur. Yet at the end of these understated adventures he seems to have come a long way, even if he is merely stepping out of the confines of a New Yorker cartoon and into the real world. And the next time he packs a suitcase, figuratively speaking, there'll be something to put inside."
