= Susan Engberg =

American novelist (1940–2021)

- Born: June 12, 1940 (age 86); Dubuque, Iowa, U.S.
- Died: October 10, 2021; Milwaukee, Wisconsin, U.S.
- Education: Lawrence University
- Occupation: Author

Susan Engberg (June 12, 1940 – October 10, 2021) was an American novelist and award-winning author.

== Biography ==
Susan Engberg was of German and Danish descent. After graduating Phi Beta Kappa from Lawrence University in Wisconsin with a degree in English, Engberg worked at the Metropolitan Museum of Art in New York, at Yale University, and as an editor for the Iowa Review.

Engberg was the author of four short story collections. Her first collection, Pastorale, was called “so good that [it] could change your life” by Russell Banks in The New York Times. She followed this up with A Stay by the River and Sarah's Laughter. Her latest collection, Above the Houses, was called "gorgeously crafted" in a review in Publishers Weekly, which added that "Engberg's quiet denouements feel wholly integral to these tales of quiet desperation."

Engberg lived in Milwaukee with her husband, Charles, an architect and jazz musician, and their two daughters. She died in 2021, following a five-year illness.

== Awards ==
Pastorale won the 1993 Banta Book Award.
