= Michael Dahlie =

American novelist

- Born: 1970 (age 55–56)
- Education: Colorado College; University of Wisconsin–Madison (MA); Washington University in St. Louis (MFA)
- Occupation: Novelist
- Spouse: Allison Lynn
- Children: 1
- Writing career
- Notable awards: Whiting Award (2010)

Michael Dahlie (born 1970) is an American novelist. He won a 2010 Whiting Award.

== Life ==
He graduated from Colorado College and the University of Wisconsin–Madison with an MA in European History, and from Washington University in St. Louis with an MFA in creative writing. He was Booth Tarkington Writer-in-Residence at Butler University.

His debut novel, A Gentleman’s Guide to Graceful Living, won the 2009 PEN/Hemingway Award. His second book, The Best of Youth, was published in 2013 by W. W. Norton. His work has appeared in Ploughshares, The Kenyon Review, and Tin House.

He lives in Indianapolis. He is married to the novelist Allison Lynn; they have one son.

== Works ==
=== Novels ===
- A Gentleman's Guide to Graceful Living. WW Norton. 2008. ISBN 978-0-39306-617-3. "isbn:9780393336351."
- The Best of Youth. WW Norton. 2013. ISBN 978-0-39308-185-5. "isbn:9780393081855."

=== Short stories ===
- "The Begging Chair". The Kenyon Review. XXII (3/4). Kenyon College. Fall 2000.
- "Young Collectors' Day". Ploughshares. Emerson College. Fall 2002.
- "The Children of Stromsund". Tin House. 41. Fall 2009.
- "The Pharmacist from Jena". Harper's. January 2012.
