= Catherine Chung =

American writer

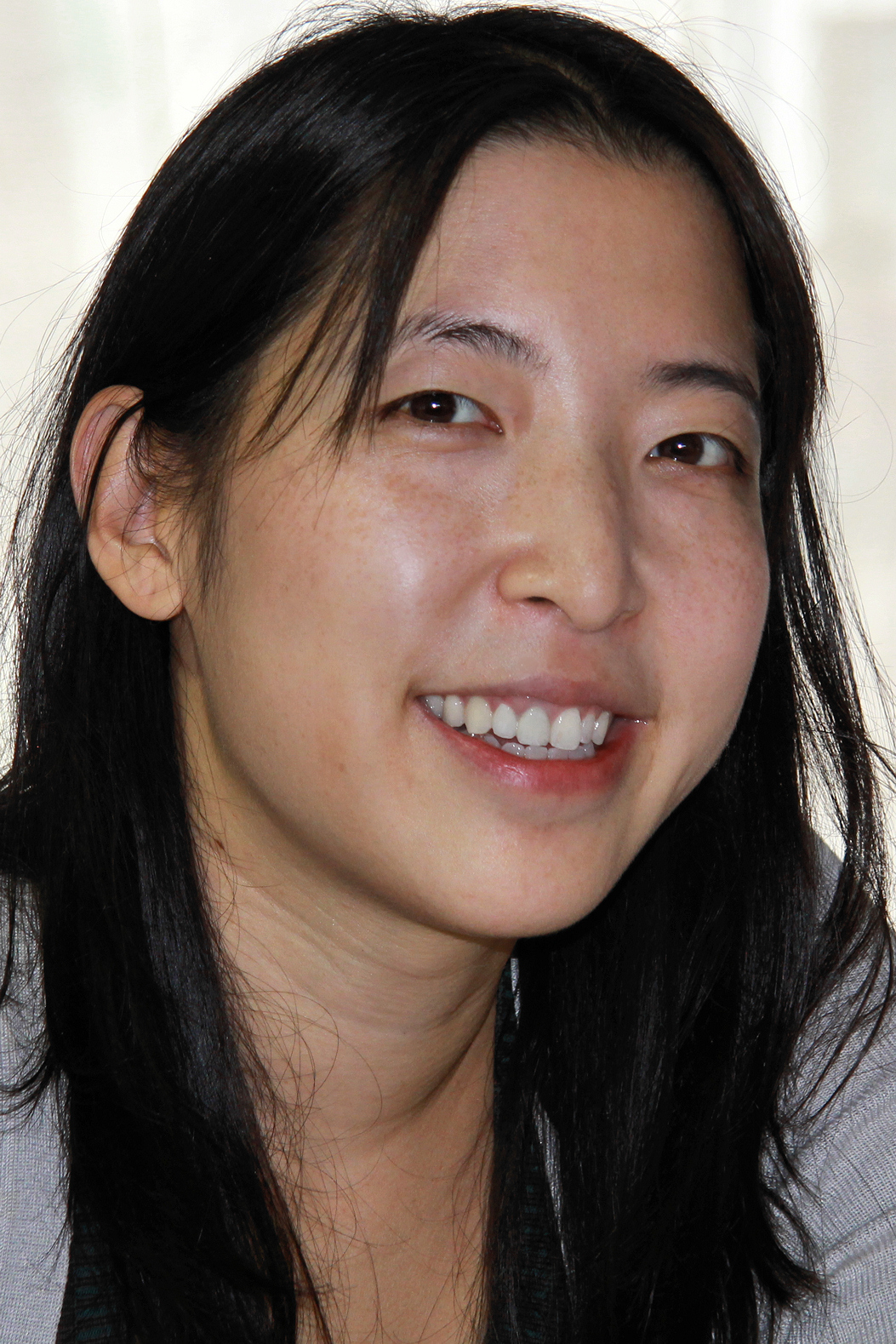
- Catherine Chung at the 2013 Texas Book Festival.
- Born: Evanston, Illinois, U.S.
- Education: University of Chicago; Cornell University (MFA)
- Writing career
- Genre: Novel

Catherine Chung is an American writer whose first novel, Forgotten Country, received an Honorable Mention for the 2013 PEN/Hemingway Award, and was an Indie Next Pick, in addition to being chosen for several best of lists including Booklist's 10 Best Debut Novels of 2012, and the San Francisco Chronicle's and Bookpage's Best Books of 2012. She received a 2014 National Endowment for the Arts Fellowship in Creative Writing, and was recognized in 2010 by Granta magazine as one of its "New Voices" of the year. Her second book The Tenth Muse was released to critical acclaim, and was a 2019 Finalist for a National Jewish Book Award. In 2015 Buzzfeed named her one of 32 Essential Asian American Writers.

== Early life and education ==
Chung was born in Evanston, Illinois, and has a brother. She grew up in New York, New Jersey and Michigan.

She graduated with a mathematics degree from the University of Chicago, and worked at the think tank the RAND Corporation before attending Cornell University to receive her MFA.

== Career ==
Chung's critically acclaimed debut novel, Forgotten Country, was published in 2012 by Riverhead Books, a division of Penguin Press. Her second novel, The Tenth Muse was published in 2019 by Ecco, a division of Harper Collins. She has also published short stories and essays in The New York Times, The Rumpus, and Granta, and was the recipient of a Dorothy Sargent Rosenberg Prize in Poetry.

She has been a fellow at the MacDowell Colony, Yaddo, Hedgebrook, Civitella Ranieri, and Jentel, and received support for her writing from the Camargo Foundation, the Jerome Foundation, and the Constance Saltonstall Foundation. She was a Picador Guest Professor at the University of Leipzig, a Director's Visitor at the Institute for Advanced Study in Princeton, and an Assistant Professor of Creative Writing at Adelphi University. Chung is the recipient of a 2014 National Endowment for the Arts Fellowship in Creative Writing, and a Granta New Voice.
