= Lost in the City =

1992 story collection by Edward P. Jones

- First edition
- Author: Edward P. Jones
- Language: English
- Genre: Short stories
- Publisher: William Morrow and Company
- Publication date: June 16, 1992
- Publication place: United States
- Media type: Print

Lost in the City is a 1992 collection of short stories about African-American life in Washington, D.C., by Pulitzer Prize-winning author Edward P. Jones.

== Summary ==
Lost in the City is a collection of 14 stories. The author, a native of Washington, writes about the ordinary residents of the city: "I had read James Joyce's Dubliners, and I was quite taken with what he had done and I set out to give a better picture of what the city is like—the other city."

The book starts with the youngest character and ends with the oldest character.

== Lost in the City and All Aunt Hagar's Children ==
The structure of Lost in the City mirrors that of All Aunt Hagar's Children, another collection of short stories written by Jones:

The first story in Lost in the City has to do with Betsy Ann and the pigeons, and the first story in All Aunt Hagar's Children is about the infancy of the man who ultimately gives her the pigeons. The second story of each collection is about the schooling of some type and is told in the first person. Penny, the grocer, is introduced in "The Store," in Lost in the City, and she shows up in the title story of All Aunt Hagar's Children. In both of those stories, the narrator is a first-person man, but he has no name, and so on. If I ever do a third collection, it will be like that, too.

In Lost in the City, the story of “The First Day” chronicles a young girl's first day of school. The story is told from the young girl's point of view. The story opens with her describing how she gets ready by drawing a picture of the style of her hair and the outfit she wears including her new shoes that she loves. As the story progresses we learn that the narrator and her mom went to the wrong school and now have to travel and register for the new school in town. Unlike the old school, which was a familiar structure of their community but run-down, the new school was shiny and new and represents the unknown. The young girl's mom doesn't know how to read so she pays someone to help fill the paperwork out and the mom gives the helper 50 cents for her help. The story ends with the five-year-old girl listening to her mother's footsteps as she walks away. When reading the story, the author stresses the value of education through the amount of effort the family and the community put into the first day of school. It also provides commentary on how the community uses school to judge families. Before the mom and the girl left, they made sure the young girl was fed and well dressed.^{[5]}

== Awards and nominations ==
Lost in the City won the Hemingway Foundation/PEN Award in 1993 and was a finalist for the National Book Award for Fiction.
