= Dagoberto Gilb =

American writer

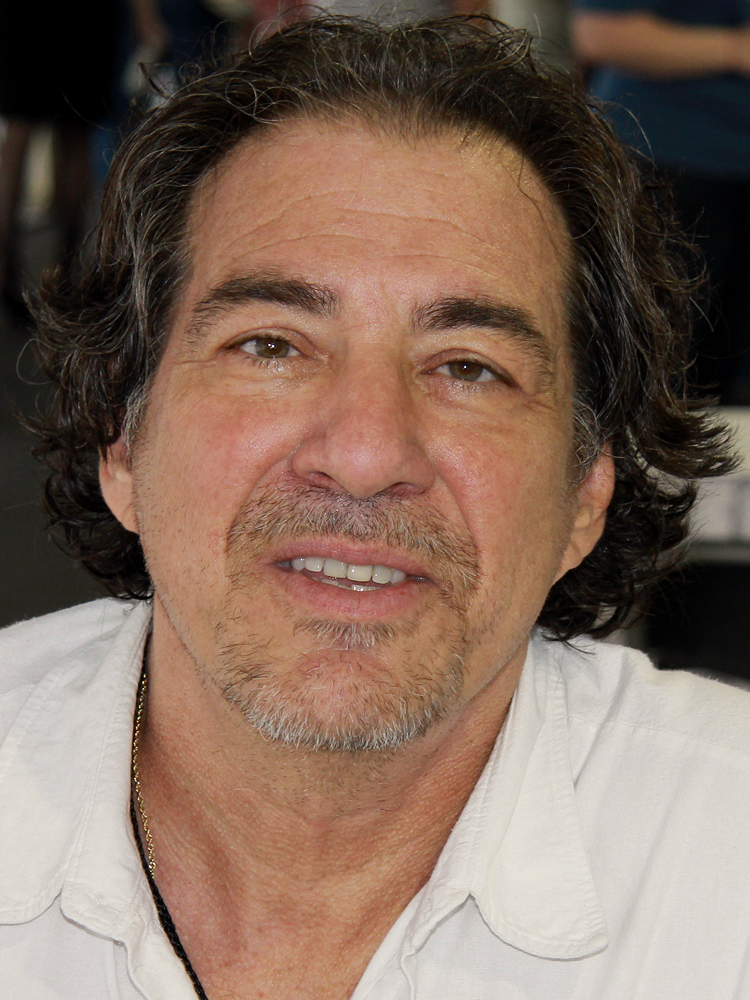
Dagoberto Gilb at the 2011 Texas Book Festival.

Dagoberto Gilb (born 1950 in Los Angeles), is an American writer, a Chicano from the American Southwest.

He attended the University of California, Santa Barbara, where he earned both bachelor's and master's degrees. Gilb embarked on a career in construction for 16 years, became a journeyman carpenter, and joined the United Brotherhood of Carpenters and Joiners in Los Angeles.

== Background ==
Gilb was born to a mother from Mexico who came across the border undocumented, while his father was born in Kentucky. Gilb's parents were raised in Los Angeles from a young age—his mother in downtown L.A., his father in Boyle Heights. Both spoke Spanish. The two divorced when he was very young, and he was raised by his mother. His father worked for 49 years in an industrial laundry, where he became the floor supervisor. He was in the Marine Corps as a scout during World War II. His mother was a model in her early years, then became a dental assistant, until she remarried two more times.

Gilb began working at thirteen as a sheet shaker and sorter at the industrial laundry, then found jobs as a janitor and a factory shipping clerk. After high school, he went to several community colleges, working full-time as a paper cutter and as a stockboy in a major department store. He finally transferred to the University of California, Santa Barbara. He graduated in 1974 with a double major in Philosophy and Religious Studies, remaining there until he also received an M.A. in Religious Studies in 1976.

From 1976-79 Gilb worked in many areas of the construction trades to make his living, as a laborer, stonemason, and carpenter in El Paso. A new father, by 1979 he had joined the United Brotherhood of Carpenters and Joiners of America, and he worked as a journeyman until 1992 in Los Angeles. Though he did all facets of carpentry work, his main employment was as class-A high-rise.

From 1997-2024 Gilb worked as a creative writing professor at Texas State University and the University of Houston-Victoria, where he founded and edited the literary magazine Huizache: The Magazine of Latino Literature as executive director of CentroVictoria. He had also been a visiting writer at the University of Texas at Austin, the University of Arizona, the University of Wyoming, Fresno State University, and Vassar College.

== Writing career ==
In 1977, while completing a never-published novel, Gilb was working on a three-story addition to the museum at the University of Texas at El Paso when he learned of the writer Raymond Carver, who was teaching across the campus street and was only at the beginning of his national acclaim. Because of Carver's prominence, Gilb turned to stories. He began publishing in 1982. The first bound work of his own writing was a chapbook-sized collection, Winners on the Pass Line (1985), which was also the first by El Paso's Cinco Puntos Press. His first full book of stories (35 had been published in magazines by then) was The Magic of Blood (1993), with the University of New Mexico Press. The stories are populated by working men, Mexican American, who live in the Southwest, from Los Angeles to El Paso. It won the 1994 PEN/Hemingway Foundation Award, the Jesse Jones Texas Institute of Letters Award, and was a PEN Faulkner finalist.

More books followed, all published in New York by Grove Press: a novel, The Last Known Residence of Mickey Acuña (1994), about a drifter living at a financial border as a resident of a YMCA on the El Paso border; a collection of short fiction, Woodcuts of Women (2001), stories of men in love with women; a collection of nonfiction essays, Gritos (2003), a finalist for the National Book Critics' Circle Award, collecting Gilb's nonfiction essays as a construction worker, a writer, a teacher, and a parent; an anthology, Hecho en Tejas (2006), winner of the PEN Southwest Book Award, now the canonical work of record for Mexican American literature in Texas; and the novel The Flowers (2008), an urban survival tale of a Chicano becoming a man in a city (that is Los Angeles in 1965) on the verge of a white-and-black race riot. Before the End, After the Beginning (2011) collects short fiction after a brain injury Gilb suffered in 2009. The book is a deeper meditation on the transitory, on impermanence, on "unseen" people, themes and characters Gilb has always dwelled on, heightened.

In Gritos, the collection of personal, narrative essays, Gilb locates his work in American letters, and by doing so, claims space for Chicanos in American life and culture. Gilb labels his narrative approach "first-person stupid", but critics praise its candor, depth, and clarity (despite or maybe because of the author's rejection of heavy-handed commentary). The essays are parable-like: "fool stories" that express learned wisdom.

Gilb has also worked on movies that have appeared on screen (Solo Dios Sabe, 2006) and documentaries (e.g. Writ Writer, 2008), and spent several years (1994-1997) writing commentaries which aired on the NPR show Fresh Air.

In 1997, he accepted a job teaching in the MFA program at Southwest Texas State University, now Texas State University. He had tenure there for almost ten years. In September 2009, Gilb was recruited to join the faculty of the University of Houston–Victoria as a Writer-in-Residence, Professor of Latino Studies, and Executive Director of CentroVictoria: Center for Mexican American Literature and Culture. Then a tenured full professor for twenty years, in fall 2017 Gilb legally challenged a hostile demand to alter their mutually agreed upon contract, which added five courses of freshman composition to his academic duties. A lawsuit he filed in a federal court in Texas against the University of Houston-Victoria alleging unique workplace discrimination and breach of contract, found no discrimination of race, age, or disability, and that because the State of Texas has sovereign immunity, it is barred against any claims for breach of contract. At the end of December 2024, the University of Houston System terminated Gilb for his refusal to work under their revised contract, losing both his job and tenure.

In fall 2024, Gilb published two books of the Chicano Southwest with publishers from the American West. New Testaments, with San Francisco's City Lights Books, reasserts Gilb's career focus in the short story form (the "story", as singular, unique, and separate in fiction as are both the novel and poetry) and claims this collection's stories are free from the tropes, stereotypes, and cliches that have defined and haunted Mexican American literature since its inception in the United States. A Passing West, with the University of New Mexico Press, is a follow-up of his earlier book of essays Gritos, gathering essays written since it to 2023. Both collections also feature art by nationally known and admired artist, César A. Martínez. It won PEN America's prestigious Diamonstein-Spielvogel Award for the Art of the Essay.

Gilb's writing work, as books and in periodicals, have been translated in several languages, including French, German, Japanese, Chinese, Italian, Spanish, and Russian. A unique Russian collection, in Cyrillic, At the Border: Between Desperation and Hope, was edited and published in 2021.

== Awards ==
- James D. Phelan Award, San Francisco Foundation, 1984
- Dobie-Paisano Fellowship, Texas Institute of Letters, 1987
- National Endowment for the Arts Fellowship, 1992
- Whiting Award, 1993
- PEN/Hemingway Award, 1994
- PEN Faulkner Award, finalist, 1994
- El Paso Writers' Hall of Fame, 1995
- Guggenheim Foundation Fellowship, 1995
- National Book Critics Circle Award, finalist, 2003
- Texas Book Festival Bookend Award, 2007
- PEN Southwest Book Award, 2008
- Gloria Anzaldúa Milagro Prize, Macondo Foundation, 2010
- Illumine Prize for Excellence in Fiction, Austin Public Library Foundation, 2011
- Barbara Jordan Media Award (Texas Governor's Committee on People with Disability), 2018
- PEN/Diamonstein-Spielvogel Award, 2025

== Books ==
- Winners on the Pass Line and Other Stories, 1985
- The Magic of Blood, 1993
- The Last Known Residence of Mickey Acuña, 1994
- Woodcuts of Women, 2000
- Gritos, 2003
- Hecho en Tejas: An Anthology of Texas Mexican Literature, 2006
- The Flowers, 2008
- Before the End, After the Beginning, 2011
- Mexican American Literature: A Portable Anthology, 2015
- New Testaments, 2024
- A Passing West, 2024

== Selected works ==
- "Down in the West Texas Town", Puerto del Sol, Spring 1982
- "Where the Sun Don't Shine", The Threepenny Review, Fall 1983
- "Look on the Bright Side", The Pushcart Prize XVII: Best of the Small Presses, 1992
- "Poverty Is Always Starting Over", Fresh Air, July 26, 1994
- "Northeast Direct", The Threepenny Review, Fall 1996; The Best American Essays, 1999
- "María de Covina", The New Yorker, September 29, 1997
- "Victoria", The Best American Essays, 1999
- "I Knew She Was Beautiful", The New Yorker, March 13, 2000
- "Work Is Good" Carpenter, September/October 2000
- "Romero's Shirt", Still Wild, 2000
- "Pride", The Texas Observer, May 24, 2001
- "Blue Eyes, Brown Eyes", Harper's Magazine, June 2001
- "Documenting the Undocumented", The Los Angeles Times, July 5, 2001
- "About Tere Who Was in Palomas", Pushcart Prize Stories XXVI: Best of the Small Presses, 2001
- "Sentimental for Steinbeck", The New York Times, March 18, 2002
- "Spanish Guy", The New Yorker, April 22 & 29, 2002
- "You Know Him by His Labors", The Los Angeles Times, January 14, 2004
- "Me Macho, You Jane", The Barcelona Review, September–October 2004
- "Willows Village", Harper's Magazine, September 2008
- "please, thank you", Harper's Magazine, June 2010
- "Uncle Rock", The PEN/O'Henry Prize Stories, 2012
- "A Passing West" (as "Pride and Prejudice"), Texas Monthly, February 2013
- "Thou Shalt Not Steal Books", LARB Magazine, August 2017
- "Answer", ALTA Journal, April 2020
- "Two Red Foxes", ZYZZYVA, Winter 2021
- "Snow Angel", Los Angeles Review of Books, April 5, 2021
- "Brindis at Covadonga", A Public Space, January 2022
- "Foreword to Huizache #9", Huizache, Fall 2022
- "Gray Cloud over San Jacinto Plaza", Notch, Fall 2024

== Sources ==
- "Dagoberto Gilb." Writers Directory, 24th ed. St. James Press, 2008.
- "Dagoberto Gilb." Grove Press
