= The Magic of Blood =

1993 short story collection by Dagoberto Gilb

- Cover
- Author: Dagoberto Gilb
- Language: English
- Genre: Short Story Collection
- Publisher: Grove Press
- Publication date: 1993
- Publication place: United States
- Media type: Print (hardback)
- Pages: 288

The Magic of Blood is a short story collection by Dagoberto Gilb. It received the 1994 Hemingway Foundation/PEN Award and the 1993 Whiting Writers' Award. The collection was released to rave reviews by several reputable critics, as well as authors, for its brutal realism and genuine portrayal of the marginalized masses. His book contains 29 stories separated into three distinct sections, which epitomize the perspective of the working classes and Chicano culture. Gilb's prose is simplistic in nature and his writing belongs to a proletariat genre, which explores the existence of labor, love, families, friends and the immigrant community in America.

== The Stories ==
=== Look on the Bright Side ===
An unnamed narrator refuses to pay his landlord when she raises the rent on him. In the end, his insistence upon maintaining his sense of "self-respect" results in the loss of his house. Consequently, he sends his family off to "visit" his parents, while he searches for a new job.

=== The Death Mask of Pancho Villa ===
When an unnamed narrator is visited by an old friend and his companion, he is struck with an epiphany concerning the man he used to be versus the man he has become.

=== Nancy Flores ===
Once Richie meets, and loses, his first love Nancy Flores, the protagonist revels in the ongoing debasement of the boy who stole her from him (Trey).

=== I Danced with the Prettiest Girl ===
When two musicians, on their way to Austin, stop at a roadside bar, the narrator finds "true love."

=== The Magic of Blood ===
A man meets his great-grandmother in Hollywood, only to then realize that her revered status as a great actress has largely been a fabrication, and that her previous glamor has dissipated with age.

=== Al, in Phoenix ===
Once a man's car breaks down near Phoenix, he tries to win the approval of his mechanic.

=== Romero's Shirt ===
A character named Romero is asked by an old gardener to trim the bushes in his yard. When Romero's shirt is stolen, he blames the gardener.

=== Churchgoers ===
At a construction site, a man named Smooth rebels against his superintendent.

=== Something Foolish ===
A son receives a phone call from his distant father who asks him to come pick him up. The father is afraid that his wife has committed suicide.

=== The Prize ===
A customer asks his barber to "wish" for a sack of money, which they will then split between themselves.

=== Truck ===
When Alex is given the company truck, he mars his reputation via the influence of his friend Carlos.

=== Where the Sun Don't Shine ===
A construction worker tries to cope with an abusive foreman, while still keeping his job and maintaining his sense of self-respect.

=== Parking Places ===
Neighboring couples, in a duplex, fight over the parking places in front of their house.

=== Recipe ===
A man goes to a poetry reading in East L.A., where he meets another man and two young women. The four of them go to a party in West L.A. The narrator takes one of the women home while dreaming of the other one.

=== Photographs Near a Rolls-Royce ===
An unemployed man and his wife decide to go to a concert. It will be their first big night out since having their child. The day before the concert, they go to pick up the tickets and the narrator takes a photo of his wife and child in front of a Rolls-Royce. The couple ask a neighbor, who is a single mother, to watch their child. The couple prepare for the night down to the last detail but the babysitter never shows up.

=== The Desperado ===
A woman walks out on her husband and leaves him alone with their infant son. It is the first time the man is alone with his son.

=== Down in the West Texas Town ===
Around midday, four construction workers get off of a job, go to one of the worker's houses to do heroin, and go to work on another job.

=== Love in L.A. ===
Jake gets into a fender bender with Mariana. He lies about his name, address, and insurance. He tells Mariana he is an actor and walks away with her phone number.

=== Winners on the Pass Line ===
A man named Ray goes to Las Vegas after getting a divorce and getting laid off. A woman named Sylvia takes a trip to Las Vegas with her husband and son.

=== The Señora ===
Jesse and Jesus are two undocumented Mexicans who work for their landlady, a wealthy Mexican woman.

=== Ballad ===
Cowboy Mike Duran is a construction worker convinced he has a reoccurring illness that prevents him from work. He has his photo taken at work for California magazine.

=== The Rat ===
The narrator is bothered by living in the city and the presence of a rat in his and his wife's apartment begins to bother him. He sends his wife and child away. There is a big storm and a power outage. The narrator kills the rat, decides his wife and child should come back, and the city begins to recover from the storm.

=== Franklin Delano Roosevelt Was a Democrat ===
FDR Was a Democrat is a story that discusses the old/young dynamic of two workers on a construction job and the validity of judging things at face value.

=== Hollywood! ===
A family takes a trip to Hollywood with their young son and argues over what will be valuable and important memories for him.

=== Vic Damone's Music ===
Vic Damone's Music is the story of a young teenager's job in a laundry plant and his first romantic experience with a co-worker.

=== Getting a Job in Dell City ===
Getting a Job in Dell City is the final story in The Magic of Blood collection. It begins with a man looking for work in El Paso, Texas. He finds work on a farm outside of town. The story discusses the fragility of relationships between workers, bosses and coworkers.

== Publication ==
Dagoberto Gilb's short story collection was first published by the University of New Mexico Press in 1993. The paperback edition was later released by Grove Press in 1994.

== Critical reception ==
The Magic of Blood was released to rave reviews from various critics and authors. It was also the winner of the PEN/Hemingway Award in 1994 and was a PEN Faulkner finalist. At the award ceremony, American journalist and author E. Annie Proulx praised Gilb's collection by declaring, "The stories are leavened with compassion and humor and there is not a shred of sentimentality. The Magic of Blood marks the introduction of an important new voice in American literature.” Alongside these accolades, reputable publications, such as Newsweek, The Philadelphia Inquirer and The Nation, called Gilb's writing "... the most exciting and emotionally draining since Raymond Carver's." His honest, unsentimental, and respectful portrayal of immigrants, ethnic minorities, and working class citizens, stuck in the turmoil of the Reagan-Bush era, has been celebrated throughout the literary community and is often compared to the literary style of Anton Chekhov and Nikolai Gogol.

== Genre ==
Dagoberto Gilb's The Magic of Blood is a collection of short stories about proletarian life from a Chicano perspective.

== Themes ==
Major themes prominent throughout Gilb's collection include: proletarian work and love, vacations, the family, friendships, youth and aging.

E. Annie Proulx mentions many of the collection's themes, "a Southwest world of bills and debts and being laid off, of old trucks, paychecks that bounce, greedy landladies, fights, cheap girls, drugs, unemployment compensation, difficult bosses, color of skin, language games, a hunger for work," in her citation for PEN's Ernest Hemingway Foundation Award.

== Style ==
Gilb writes in a clear and simple style.
