= Awake in the Floating City =

2025 book

- Author: Susanna Kwan
- Language: English
- Publisher: Pantheon Books
- Publication date: 2025
- Publication place: United States

Awake in the Floating City is a 2025 climate fiction novel by Susanna Kwan.

== Themes ==
According to Lorraine Berry of The Los Angeles Times, the novel "asks whether those songs may be sung if there are no choirs to sing them. Choirs require community, and the role of community during environmental disaster is one of the themes that runs through this thoughtful novel about art, creation and the ways we care for one another." AudioFile described the novel as being "about identity and creating a sense of home amid displacement."

== Reception ==
Kirkus Reviews reviewed the novel as "marvelously graceful." Alexandra Pierce of Locus reviewed the novel as "a very human, almost mundane story... By mundane I do not mean boring: I mean one that doesn’t try to fix the problems of climate change, or have exciting adventures despite or because of it," saying that it "demonstrate[s] human resilience in the face of ever-more challenging circumstances. And not just resilience: compassion, creativity, love. Kwan brings her city and her characters to life with grace and beauty."

Publishers Weekly reviewed the novel as "a lyrical tale" with "spare and sometimes enigmatic prose," albeit criticising that "the plot is too leisurely paced, and Bo’s relationship with a married man named Eddie feels somewhat superfluous and underdeveloped."
