= Forgotten Country =

2012 novel by Catherine Chung

- First edition
- Author: Catherine Chung
- Language: English
- Genre: Fiction
- Publisher: Riverhead Books
- Publication date: 2012
- Publication place: United States
- Media type: Print
- Pages: 304
- ISBN: 9781594488085
- OCLC: 779255951

Forgotten Country is a 2012 novel by the American writer Catherine Chung and is published by Riverhead Books. She was recognized by Granta magazine as one of its "New Voices" of 2010.

== Plot ==
The Story is about Janie, her sister Hannah, and their parents, who moved to the United States from South Korea when the girls were young. Their father felt he needed to flee to escape political persecution under an oppressive government. His older sister, Komo, had already moved to the US, where her two sons were born. Their father and Komo are close, as they were orphaned when young and she took care of them, even when they lived with an uncle's family.

Janie remembered her maternal grandmother telling her that the family "lost" its daughters; that it had lost a daughter in each generation since the Japanese occupation. Janie's mother's older sister was kidnapped from a college dorm by North Korean soldiers who were taking girls, and never returned.

As a teenager, Hannah became rebellious, then left home and cut ties with her parents. Janie needs to find her, as their father is dying of cancer. The girls grew up in the United States, having to adapt to English names given to them in school, English, and changes in culture. Janie has to find her sister before it is too late; her parents have returned to South Korea for recommended treatment for her father, whose cancer has metastasized.

== Characters ==
- Janie/Jeehyun/Narrator
- Hannah/Haejin/ Narrator Sister
- their parents
- their maternal grandmother
- Komo, their father's older sister
- Gabe, Komo's son, born in the US
- Keith, Komo's son, born in the US

== Reception ==
Reviews were favorable, with a 3.5 average review on Goodreads.
