= Neely Tucker =

American journalist

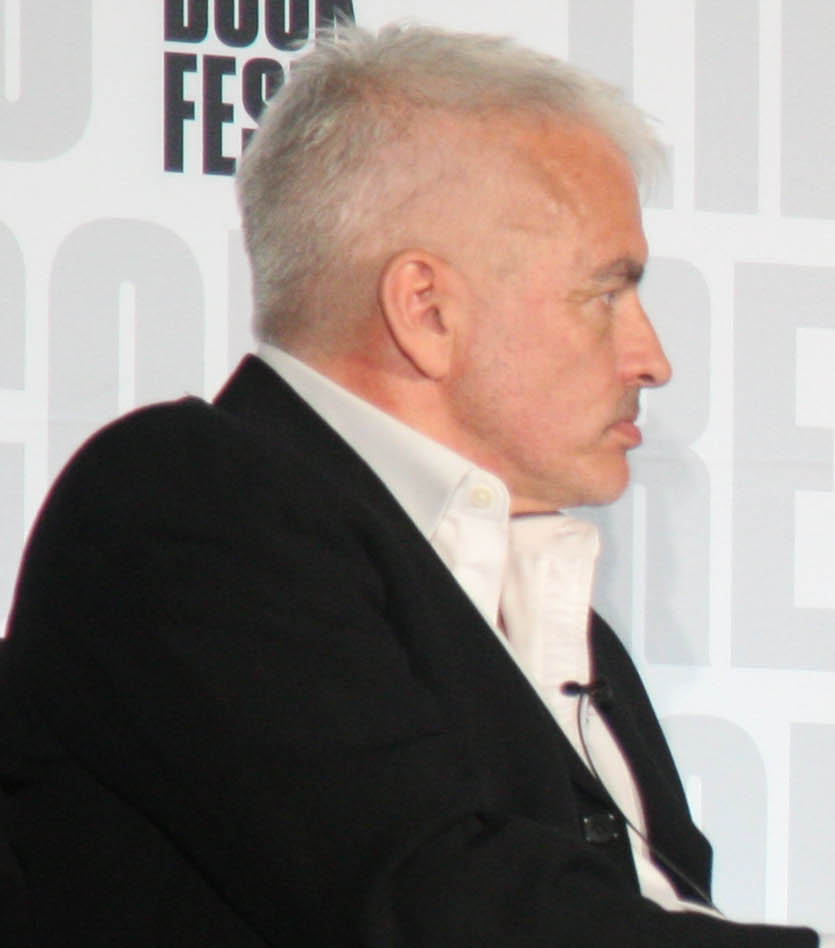
Neely Tucker

Neely Tucker (born November 26, 1963, in Lexington, Mississippi) is an American journalist and writer. He is the author of Love in the Driest Season, an autobiographical story that chronicles his journey from his education at a whites-only school in Mississippi, his marriage to a Jamaican, and his adoption of a Zimbabwean child. A former journalist at The Washington Post, he previously worked as a foreign correspondent in Zimbabwe, where he and his wife, Vita lived, eventually adopting a child. He is currently a writer-editor in the Office of Communications at the Library of Congress.

== Personal ==
Tucker was raised in Mississippi by his parents Elizabeth and Duane Tucker. He has a brother named Duane Jr. He lives near Washington DC. His favorite teams are Mississippi State and the New Orleans Saints.

== Education ==
Tucker attended Starkville Academy, a segregation academy. He started first grade at SA on the day it opened and graduated in 1982, playing football, writing for the school's newspaper, and earning the title Mister Starkville Academy. After graduating high school, he went on to attend Mississippi State University but later obtained his degree from the University of Mississippi where he was selected as the most outstanding journalism student at graduation in 1986. In 2018, he returned to Starkville Academy and delivered a speech on racism, in which he drew an analogy between white students such as himself and monsters, and compared the Mississippi of the mid twentieth-century with the apartheid rule in South Africa.

== Career ==
Throughout Tucker's career, he has reported from more than 50 countries around the world. While attending the University of Mississippi, he worked for the Oxford Eagle in Mississippi. Upon graduating, he went on to work for Florida Today, Gannett's national wire service, and the Miami Herald. He then served as a foreign correspondent at the Detroit Free Press. Tucker was nominated for the Pulitzer Prize in 2011 for "Life After Death," a story about his wife's seven-year odyssey to help convict her daughter's killer. In 2019, Tucker became a writer-editor at the Library of Congress.

== Books ==
- Love in the Driest Season
- Murder DC
- Only the Hunted Run
- The Ways of the Dead
