= The Known World =

2003 novel by Edward P. Jones

- Second edition cover
- Author: Edward P. Jones
- Cover artist: Cover design by Laura Blost, Cover photograph copyright Eudora Welty
- Language: English
- Genre: Historical, Novel
- Publisher: Amistad Press
- Publication date: September 2003
- Publication place: United States
- Media type: Print (hardback & paperback)
- Pages: 400 pp
- ISBN: 0-06-055754-0
- OCLC: 51519698
- Dewey Decimal: 813/.54 21
- LC Class: PS3560.O4813 K58 2003

The Known World is a 2003 historical novel by Edward P. Jones. Set in Virginia during the antebellum era, it examines the issues regarding the ownership of Black slaves by both White and Black Americans.

The book was published to acclaim, which praised its story and Jones's prose. In particular, his ability to intertwine stories within stories received great praise from The New York Times.

== Synopsis ==
The novel centers on Henry Townsend, a formerly enslaved Black man who becomes a slave owner himself in the fictional Manchester County, Virginia. The story opens with Henry's death in 1855, then shifts between past and present, exploring the events leading up to and following his demise.

Born into slavery, Henry gains his freedom when his father, Augustus Townsend, purchases it for him. Yet, despite his background, Henry goes on to own more than thirty enslaved people who work on his tobacco plantation. His decision creates tension with his parents and challenges readers’ assumptions about the nature of slavery.

The narrative weaves together the lives of various characters connected to the Townsend estate:

- Caledonia, Henry's widow, who struggles to manage the plantation after his death.
- Moses, the overseer, who dreams of taking Henry's place.
- Fern Elston, a free Black woman who educated Henry and later becomes close to Caledonia.
- Sheriff John Skiffington, who enforces slave laws despite his personal opposition to slavery.

As the story unfolds, it reveals the moral contradictions and social complexities of a society built on human bondage. The disappearance of several enslaved people from the Townsend plantation triggers a chain of events that exposes the fragile foundations of this oppressive system.

== Awards and nominations ==
The novel won a National Book Critics Circle Award and the Pulitzer Prize for Fiction in 2004. In 2005, it won the International Dublin Literary Award, one of the richest literary awards for a novel in the English language. It was a finalist for the 2003 National Book Award.

In 2009, the website The Millions polled 48 critics, writers, and editors; the panel voted The Known World the second best novel since 2000. In 2015, the BBC polled American critics and ranked The Known World the "second greatest novel of the 21st century so far". In 2024, the New York Times ranked it the 4th best book of the 21st century.
