= Parkman =

Parkman may refer to:

== People ==
- Daniil Parkman, Russian-born pair skater
- Francis Parkman (1823–1893), American historian
  - Francis Parkman House
  - Francis Parkman Prize
- Francis Parkman Coffin (1880–1956), American electrical engineering pioneer
- George Parkman (1790–1849), Boston Brahmin, the victim in the Parkman–Webster murder case
- Håkan Parkman (1955–1988), Swedish composer, arranger, and choral director
- Harry L. Parkman, American politician who represented California's 19th State Assembly district
- Henry Parkman (1850–1924), American politician
- Henry Parkman Jr. (1894–1958), American politician
- Henry Parkman Sturgis (1847–1929), American-born banker and politician in England
- Jim Parkman (born 1950), American lawyer
- Paul Parkman (1932–2024), American physician
- Samuel Parkman Tuckerman (1819–1890), American composer
- Stefan Parkman (born 1952), Swedish conductor

== Places in the United States ==
- Parkman, Maine
- Parkman Township, Geauga County, Ohio
  - Parkman, Ohio
- Parkman, Wyoming
- Parkman Bandstand, Boston, Massachusetts
- Parkman Plaza, Boston, Massachusetts
- Parkman Tavern, Concord, Massachusetts
- Francis Parkman House, Boston, Massachusetts
- Watts-Parkman-Gillman House (Sturdivant Hall), Selma, Alabama

== Businesses ==
- Parkman Group, British firm of engineering consultants
- Mouchel Parkman, a former name of Mouchel, British infrastructure and business services company

== Fictional characters and locations ==
- Officer Matt Parkman, portrayed by Greg Grunberg on the NBC television series Heroes
- Maury Parkman, Matt's father, portrayed by Alan Blumenfeld
- Parkman, Indiana, town in the novel Some Came Running

== See also ==
- Pakman
- Pac-Man
