= Akman =

Akman is a Turkish surname and a masculine given name. It was developed during the Turkish language reform during the early period of the Republic of Turkey. It means "decent, clean".

Notable people with the surname include:

== Surname ==
- Ali Akman (born 2002), Turkish football player
- Ayhan Akman (born 1977), Turkish football player
- Çağatay Akman (born 1998), Turkish musical artist
- Efe Akman (born 2006), Turkish football player
- Hakan Akman (born 1989), Turkish football player
- Hamza Akman (born 2004), Turkish football player
- Kübra Akman (born 1994), Turkish volleyball player
- Nuriye Akman (born 1957), Turkish journalist and writer
- Varol Akman (born 1957), Turkish computer scientist

== Given name ==
- Akman Akyürek (died 1997), Turkish judge

== See also ==
- Pakman
