= Cornelius Coolidge =

Real estate developer (1778–1843)

- Born: 30 August 1778; Middlesex County, Massachusetts, US
- Died: 4 September 1843 (aged 65); Boston, Massachusetts, US
- Education: Harvard University

Cornelius Coolidge (August 30, 1778 - September 4, 1843) was a real estate developer in early 19th-century Boston, Massachusetts, who constructed buildings in Boston's Beacon Hill neighborhood, and elsewhere. As a young man he had been involved in maritime trade, but not always within the prescribed laws. During the War of 1812, the brig Dispatch owned by Coolidge and Francis Oliver was captured outside Boston Harbor by the Salem privateer Castigator on suspicion of trading with the enemy. Coolidge and Oliver operated two boats with 45 armed men, rowed down the harbor, and regained their brig after an exchange of gunfire. However, the district court restored the brig to the privateers.

Described variously as an architect, housewright, builder, designer, and real estate broker, Harvard-educated Coolidge brought many buildings into being. Clients of Coolidge & Co. included some of Boston's more prominent residents, such as David Sears and Charles Francis Adams. He conducted business with John Hubbard, Joseph Morton (brother of Perez Morton) and others. He was also a proprietor of the Boston Mill Corporation.

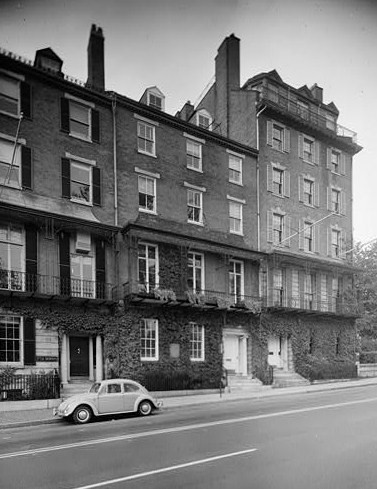
Parkman house, 33 Beacon St. (in middle), Boston; 1968 photo

Around 1825, Coolidge and Nathaniel Amory began developing property in Nahant, Massachusetts, for construction of summer homes. The first homes sold in 1827. Clients included David Sears and others. On Beacon Hill, Coolidge built houses on Chestnut, Mount Vernon, Acorn, Joy and Beacon Streets, including Louisburg Square. Several remain in existence, including:

- 33 Beacon Street (George Parkman house), 1825.
- 50 Chestnut Street (Francis Parkman house), 1830s.

Coolidge led an active social life. He was one of the first subscribers to the Boston Athenaeum. He attended the gala opening dinner party for the newly built Tremont House hotel on October 16, 1829, along with mayor Josiah Quincy, Daniel Webster, Edward Everett, Harrison Gray Otis, and others.
