= Pachman =

Pachman is a surname. Notable people with the surname include:

- Luděk Pachman (1924–2003), Czechoslovak-German chess grandmaster and activist
- Vladimir de Pachmann (1848–1933), pianist of Russian-German ethnicity

== See also ==
- Pakman
