= Nuriye =

Nuriye is a given name. Notable people with the name include:

- Nuriye Akman (born 1957), Turkish journalist
- Nuriye Ulviye Mevlan Civelek (1893–1964), Turkish women's rights advocate
- Nuriye Gülmen (born 1982), Turkish academician
- Nuriye Kesbir (born 1948), Kurdish politician

== See also ==
- Sütlü Nuriye, Turkish dessert
