= Francis Parkman House =

Historic house in Boston, Massachusetts

- U.S. National Register of Historic Places
- U.S. National Historic Landmark
- U.S. National Historic Landmark District – Contributing property
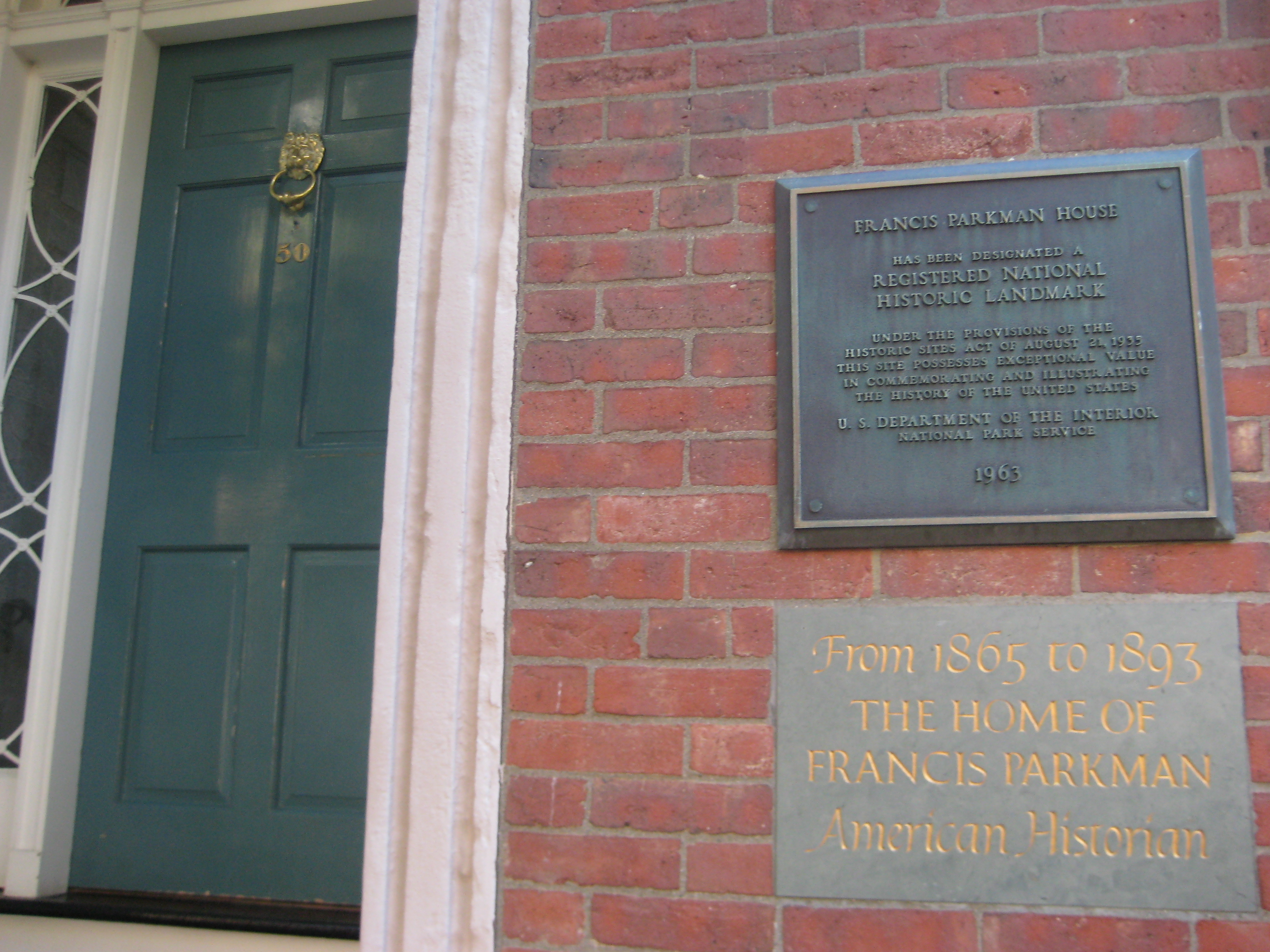

- Location within Boston Location within Massachusetts Location within the United States
- Location: Boston, Massachusetts
- Coordinates: 42°21′25″N 71°4′9″W
- Area: less than one acre
- Built: 1824
- Architect: Cornelius Coolidge
- Part of: Beacon Hill Historic District (ID66000130)
- NRHP reference No.: 66000782

Significant dates
- Added to NRHP: October 15, 1966
- Designated NHL: December 29, 1962
- Designated NHLDCP: October 15, 1966

The Francis Parkman House is a National Historic Landmark at 50 Chestnut Street, on Beacon Hill in Boston, Massachusetts. Speculated to be designed by Cornelius Coolidge and built in 1824, it is one of a series of fine brick townhouses on Beacon Hill. Its significance lies in its ownership and occupancy by noted historian and horticulturalist Francis Parkman (1823–1893) from 1865 until his death. While living here, Parkman produced a significant portion of his landmark work, France and England in North America, a multi-volume epic history recounting the conflict for control of North America in the 17th and 18th centuries.

== Description ==
The Francis Parkman House is located on Chestnut Street, a residential side street which parallels Beacon Street west of the Massachusetts State House. The street was laid out in the early 19th century, and was one of the places where architect Cornelius Coolidge designed and built townhouses. The Parkman House was built in 1824 by John Hubbard, a builder who often collaborated with Coolidge.

It is a three-story brick structure, set on the south side of the street on a lot that extends to Branch Street, and includes a small garden in the back. It is one of a series of buildings characterized by flat fronts and stone trim. The facade is two bays wide, with the left bay narrower than the right. The left bay has the entrance on the first floor, recessed under a round arch whose exterior is faced in stone and whose interior walls are finished in wood paneling. The doorway is flanked by sidelight windows and topped by a fanlight window. The windows above the door are six-over-six sash windows. On the right side, the windows on the lower two floors are six-over-six sash windows flanked on both sides by two-over-two windows, with double-width shutters. The windows at each level are slightly shorter than those on the level below, and the third floor right-side sash window has no flanking windows.

The interior of the house is organized with the stairwell on the left, and three rooms on each level, with the kitchen originally located in the basement. The building was converted into four apartments in 1956, but much of the original woodwork and plasterwork was retained in this process.

The house was designated a National Historic Landmark in 1962, and listed on the National Register of Historic Places in 1966. This house is not to be confused with the George Francis Parkman Mansion, 33 Beacon Street, which is owned by the city, and was also a Coolidge design.

== Francis Parkman ==
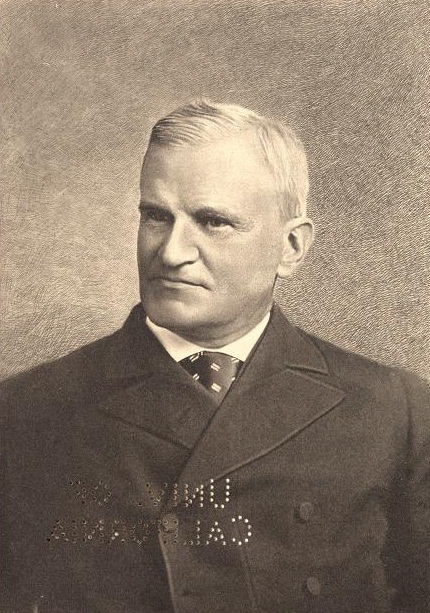
Francis Parkman

Francis Parkman (1823–1893) was born in Boston and educated at Harvard University, where he studied under historian Jared Sparks. When Parkman purchased this house in 1853, he had already published the first volume of what would become France and England in North America, a monumental work about the conflict between Great Britain and France for control of North America that cemented Parkman's reputation as a gifted writer and a leading historian of second half of the 19th century. Beset by medical problems, Parkman temporarily abandoned that work, and became and expert in the field of horticulture, serving as a professor at Harvard and as president of the Massachusetts Horticultural Society. Parkman eventually returned to his historical writing, working in a study at the front of the third floor of this townhouse.

== See also ==
- List of National Historic Landmarks in Boston
- National Register of Historic Places listings in northern Boston, Massachusetts
