= François Le Mercier =

François Joseph le Mercier (4 October 1604 – 12 June 1690) was a prominent French Jesuit in the early missions to New France and the Huron people. He was the rector of the Jesuit college in Quebec and superior of the whole Canada mission from 1653–56 and again 1665-70, during which period he authored The Jesuit Relations, as well as two published works concerning the Huron missions in the years 1637 and 1638.

== Early life ==
Le Mercier was born in Paris in 1604. He joined the Society of Jesus at Paris on 22 October 1622 and completed fifteen years of study and teaching before being sent on mission to Canada.

== Mission To Canada ==
Le Mercier arrived in Quebec on 20 July 1635. Three days later he left for the mission at Ihonatiria, a small Huron town, where he arrived on 13 August. There he studied the Huron language under the supervision of Jean de Brébeuf. He spent a good part of 1636 nursing the sick through various epidemics. The settlement at Ihonatiria was ravaged by smallpox which greatly reduced the population, so the mission was abandoned in 1637 and relocated to the Huron capital Ossossané (now in Simcoe County, Ontario).

In 1639 a new mission called Sainte-Marie among the Hurons was built on the north-east corner of Wye Lake along a stretch of river known to the Jesuits as Iroquois River (now Wye River). For a time, this served as a base for the missionaries. Le Mercier served as procurator, managing Sainte-Marie, except for a brief period of 1640 to 1642 where he returned to Ossossané, until the Jesuits were forced to abandon Sainte-Marie in 1649 due to increasing Iroquois attacks. They burned the mission before they left, so that it could not be used as a base for further raids. Le Mercier and the Jesuits then set up a mission on St. Joseph's Island, now Christian Island, which only lasted a year before they were forced to return to Quebec.

On his return to Quebec, Le Mercier was engaged in ministry there and at Trois-Rivières where he saw to the settlement's fortification. In 1653 he was named rector of the college and superior of the whole Canada mission a post he occupied until 1656. During his years as superior, he was responsible for compiling and writing the annual report to the French Provincial. These annual reports of the superiors came to be known as the Jesuit Relations. Not willing to expose others to dangers perils he was not ready to face, he appointed Jérôme Lalemant vice-superior, while Le Mercier led a missionary expedition to the Onondagas. He returned to Quebec by June 1657. From 1659 to 1660, Le Mercier was in charge of Quebec parish alongside Claude Dablon, while also attending the mission at Beaupré. In 21 October 1660 formally named assistant parish priest by de Petrée, the first Bishop of Quebec.

In August 1665 he was again named rector and superior-general of the missions, a post he held for six years. On 12 July 1671 became bursar and vice-president (et primarius in convictu) of the Jesuit college at Quebec.

== Later life ==
Le Mercier was recalled to France in 1673 and made "Visitor of the French missions in South America and in the Antilles". In 1674 he was appointed superior-general of the missions in the West Indies and continued as such until 1681. The remainder of his life was spent as confessor and spiritual director of the Jesuits on Martinique. He died on the island of Martinique on 12 June 1690 at the age of eighty-six.

== Works ==
- Relation de ce qvi s’est passé en la Novvelle France, en l’année 1637. Ihonatiria, 1637. (HTML; 235 kB, HTML; 242 kB)
- Relation de ce qvi s’est passé en la Novvelle France, en l’année 1638. Ossossané, 1638. (HTML; 214 kB)
- Journal des PP. Jésuites. Quebec, 1653. (HTML; 242 kB)
- Relation de ce qvi s'est passé en la mission des pères de la Compagnie de Iésvs, av pays de la Novvelle France, depuis l'été de l'année 1652 iusques à l'été 1653. Québec, 1653. (HTML; 211 kB)
- Journal des PP. Jésuites. Quebec, 1654. (HTML; 213 kB)
- Copie de devx Lettres envoiées de la Novvelle France, au Père Procureur des Missions de la Compagnie de Iésvs en ces contrées. Québec, 1655. (HTML; 213 kB)
- Journal des PP. Jésuites. Quebec, 1665. (HTML; 400 kB)
- Relation de ce qvi s’est passé en la Novvelle France, des années 1664 & 1665. Québec, 1665. (HTML; 400 kB, HTML; 524 kB)
- Relation de ce qvi s’est passé en la Novvelle France, aux années 1665 & 1666. Québec, 1666. (HTML; 524 kB)
- Journal des, PP. Jésuites. Québec, 1667. (HTML; 524 kB)
- Relation de ce qvi s’est passé en la Novvelle France, les années 1666 & 1667. Québec, 1667. (HTML; 524 kB, HTML; 438 kB)
- Journal des PP. Jésuites. Québec, 1668. (HTML; 438 kB)
- Relation de ce qvi s’est passé en la Novvelle France, aux années 1667 & 1668. Québec 1668. (HTML; 438 kB, HTML; 314 kB)
- Relation de ce qvi s’est passé en la Novvelle France, les années 1668 & 1669. Québec, 1669. (HTML; 314 kB)
- Relation de ce qvi s’est passé en la Novvelle France, les années 1669 & 1670. Québec, 1670. (HTML; 345 kB)

== Legacy ==
The Jesuits in North America in the Seventeenth Century, by Francis Parkman is sourced largely from the Relations written by Le Mercier.
