= Statue of Christopher Columbus (Beacon Hill, Boston) =

Statue in Beacon Hill, Boston, Massachusetts, U.S.

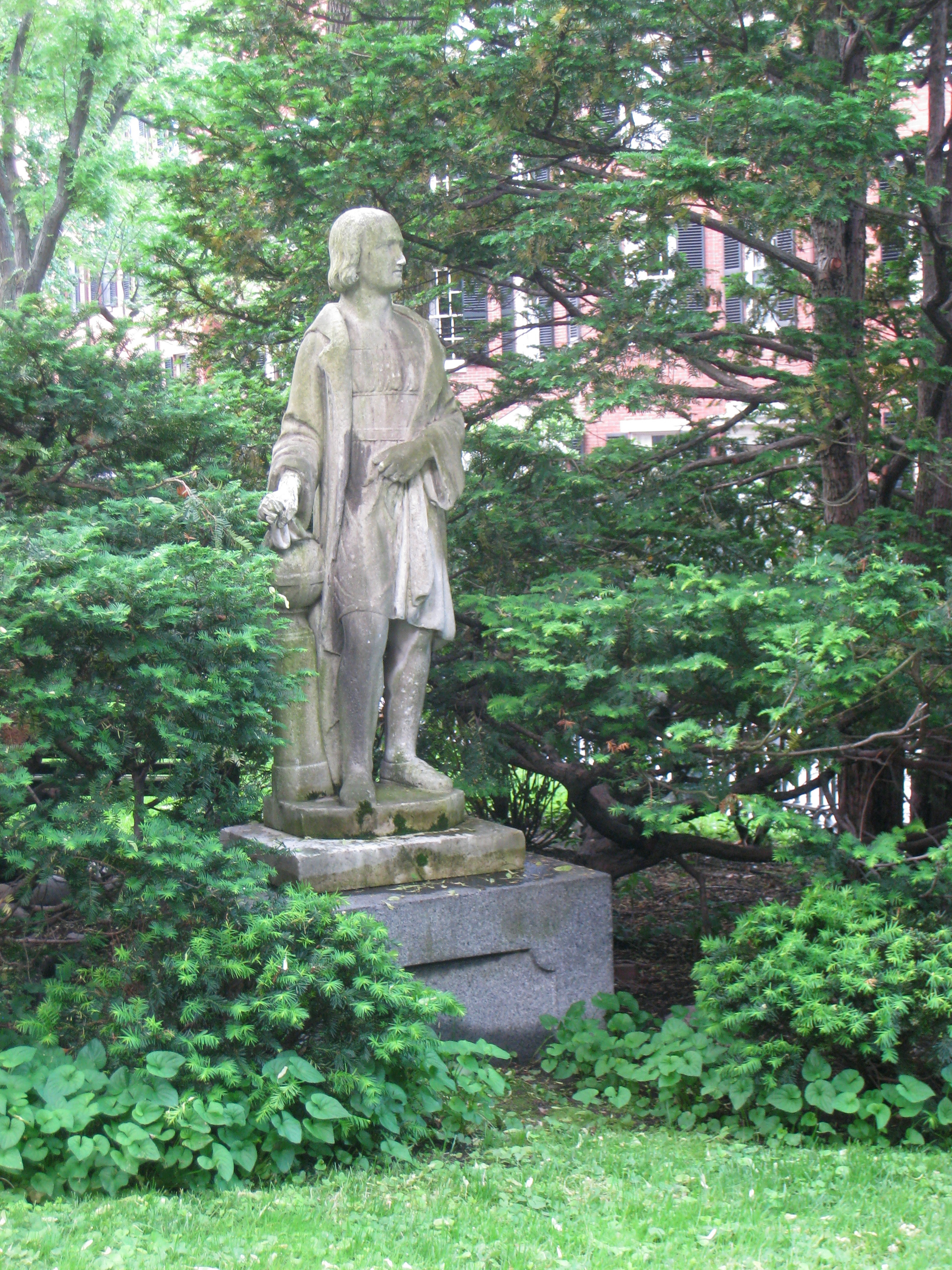
- The statue in 2009
- Medium: Marble sculpture
- Subject: Christopher Columbus
- Location: Boston, Massachusetts, U.S.; 42.358751°N 71.068823°W

A statue of Christopher Columbus is installed in Boston's Beacon Hill neighborhood, within Louisburg Square, in the U.S. state of Massachusetts. A Greek merchant, Joseph Iasigi, presented the statue to the city in December 1849. A captain of one of his vessels had loaded it onto a ship in Italy as ballast, alongside a statue of Aristides which was also donated. Both statues are described as "inferior" and "unremarkable" by art critics. The Italian marble sculpture was carved in Leghorn and depicts Columbus as a boy.

== See also ==
- List of monuments and memorials to Christopher Columbus
