= Varol =

Varol is both a given name and a surname. Notable people with the name include:

- Güven Varol (born 1981), Turkish footballer
- Ozan Varol (born 1981), author and professor
- Varol Akman (born 1957), Turkish academic
- Varol Ürkmez (1937–2021), Turkish footballer
