= Psyttaleia =

Uninhabited island in the Saronic Gulf, Greece

Native name: Ψυττάλεια
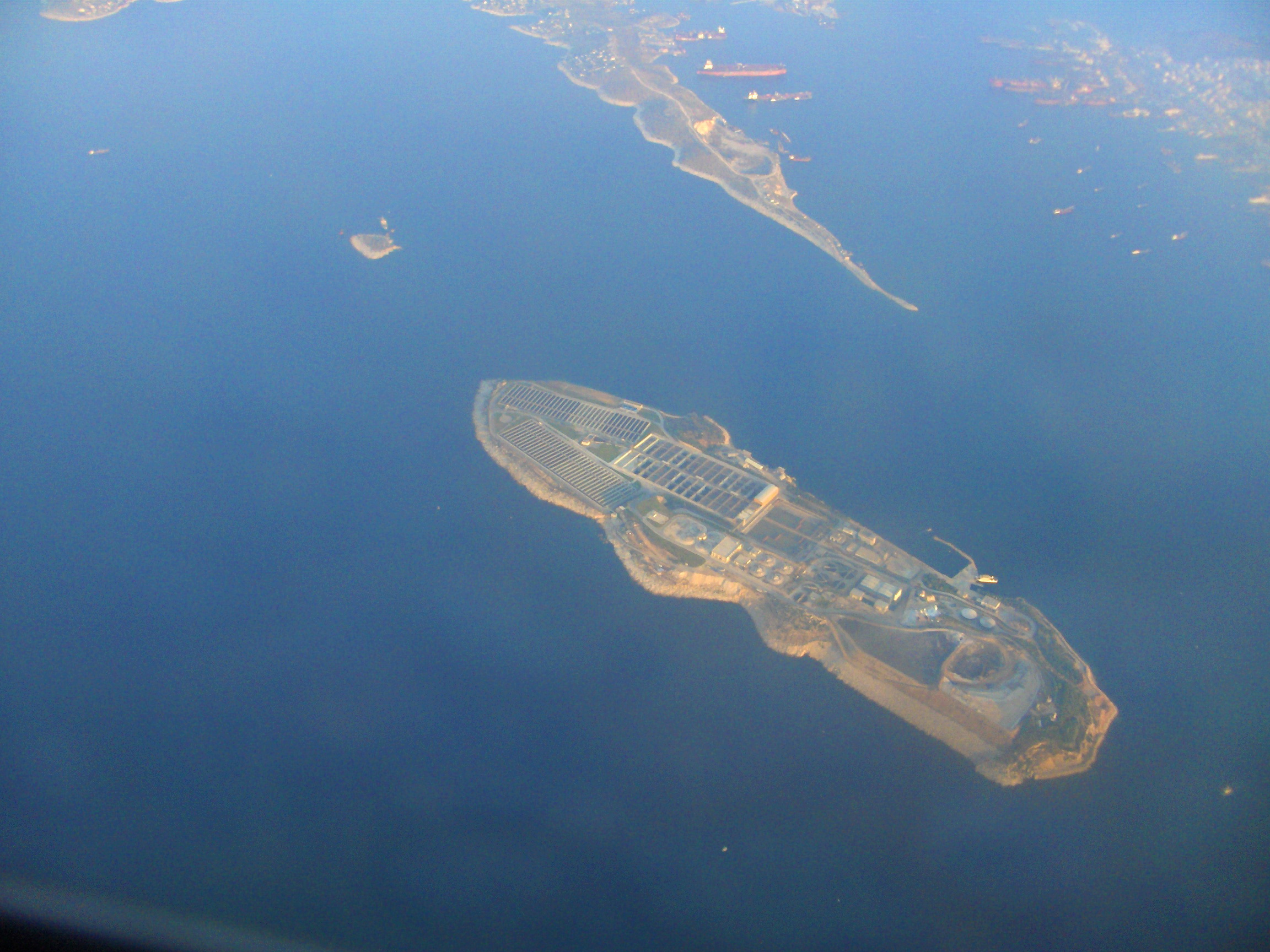
- Aerial view

- Location within Greece

Geography
- Coordinates: 37.94°N 23.588°E
- Archipelago: Saronic Islands
- Area: 0.375 km^{2} (0.145 sq mi)

Administration
- Greece
- Region: Attica
- Regional unit: Piraeus

Demographics
- Population: uninhabited (2001)

Psyttaleia (Greek: Ψυττάλεια) is an uninhabited island in the Saronic Gulf between the harbor of Piraeus and the Kynosoura peninsula on Salamis Island, Greece. It covers an area of 0.375 square kilometers. The island houses Athens' largest sewage treatment plant, which is also the largest in Europe, with a projected daily maximum drying capacity of 750 tons of sewage. Administratively it is part of the Municipality of Piraeus.

== History ==
In 480 BC, before the naval battle of Salamis, the Persians installed in the island a garrison of soldiers and noblemen. After the Greek victory, the Persian fleet retreated towards Phaleron and the guard was abandoned. Aristides, the Athenian strategos (general), landed on the island and executed all the Persians. From the Middle Ages until recently the island was called Lipsokoutali (Λειψοκουτάλι - lit. half-spoon), because it resembled a half-spoon when seen from the Mount Aigaleo. Ancient Psyttaleia has long been identified with modern Lipsokoutali, though some scholars proposed Mount Aigaleo instead; the consensus remains with Lipsokoutali.

In modern history, the island was briefly transformed into a naval prison, in accordance with the French model of the time, as well as place of exile for political dissidents.

== Sewage treatment plant ==
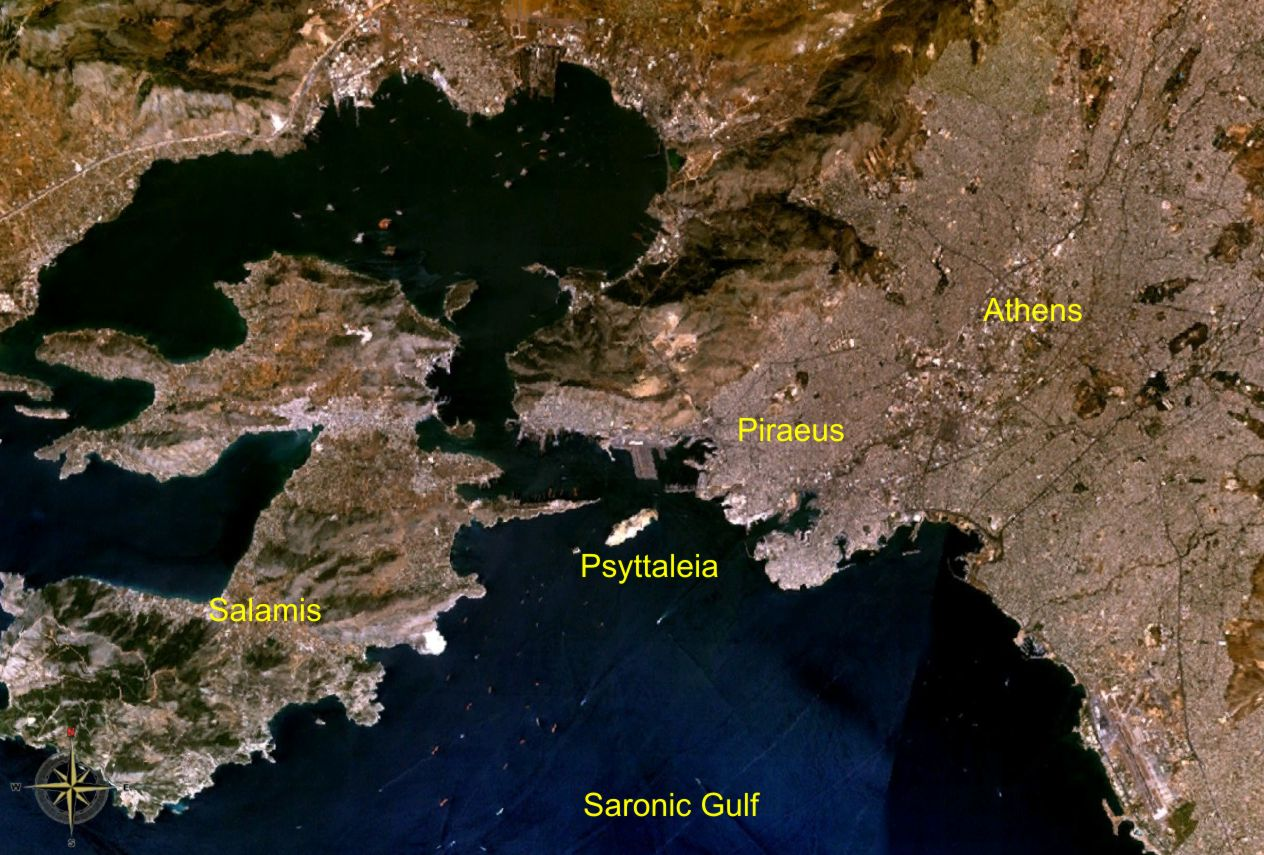
Location of Psyttaleia in the Saronic Gulf

Since the 1990s, the Saronic Gulf was starting to become polluted by industrial and residential sewage from Athens. In order to protect the ecosystem and due to considerations for negative implications on tourism, a sewage treatment plant was installed on the island which started operation in November 1994. This included the primary treatment, which prevents the waste from entering the sea, but did not provide a permanent solution for the resulting sludge. Temporary solutions of exporting the sludge and of neutralizing it through oxidization proved insufficient over the years.

On June 1, 2007, the sludge treatment plant was put into operation, with two production lines of a total waste drying capacity of 500 tons per day. Another two production lines started operation a month later, raising the total capacity to more than 750 tons per day. It is estimated that the remaining sludge of 150,000 to 160,000 tons that was accumulated on the island over the years when only the primary treatment was active, would be converted to biofuel in the first six months of operation, and used in industry, especially in cement kilns and electricity power plants. On October 5, 2007, environment vice-minister Themistoklis Xanthopoulos announced that there would be no sludge left in the following five months, and that auditors such as the European Court of Auditors had approved the quality of the plant.

== Other structures and services ==
In the northeastern part of the island, which is not occupied by the sewage treatment plant, there is a lighthouse and a station of the Hellenic Coast Guard Vessel Traffic Service system.
