= Statue of Aristides (Boston) =

Statue in Boston, Massachusetts, U.S.

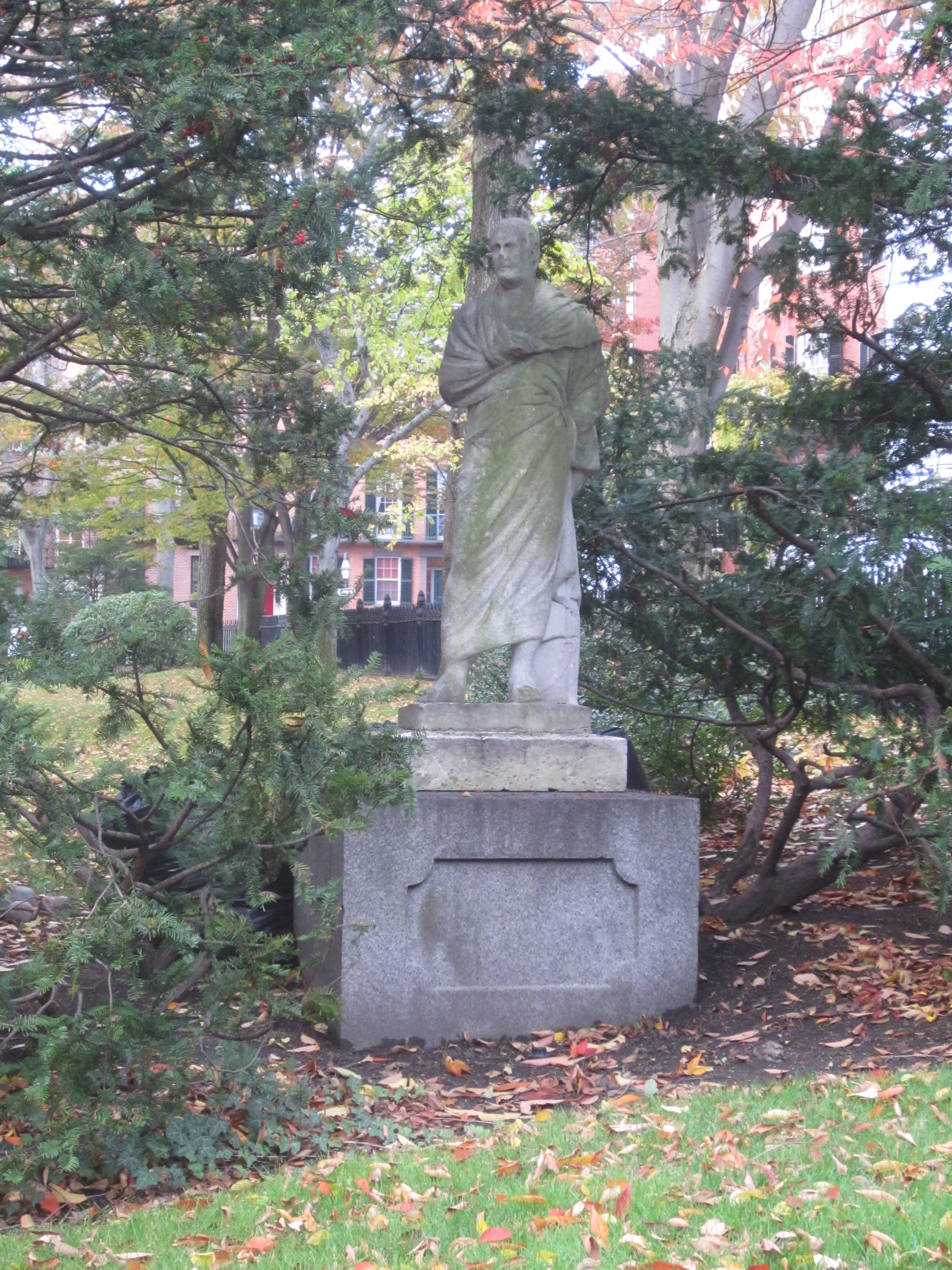
- The statue in 2019
- Subject: Aristides
- Location: Boston, Massachusetts, U.S.; 42.358163°N 71.068702°W

A statue of Aristides is installed in Boston's Beacon Hill neighborhood, within Louisburg Square, in the U.S. state of Massachusetts. The 6-foot (1.8 m) sculpture was imported from Italy in 1834 by Joseph Iasigi, then Turkish consul, who lived at 3 Louisburg Sq. When the other proprietors of the Square were reluctant to accept the statue, he sweetened his offer with a statue of Christopher Columbus for the north end of its park.
