= Aristides =

Athenian general and statesman (530–468 BC)

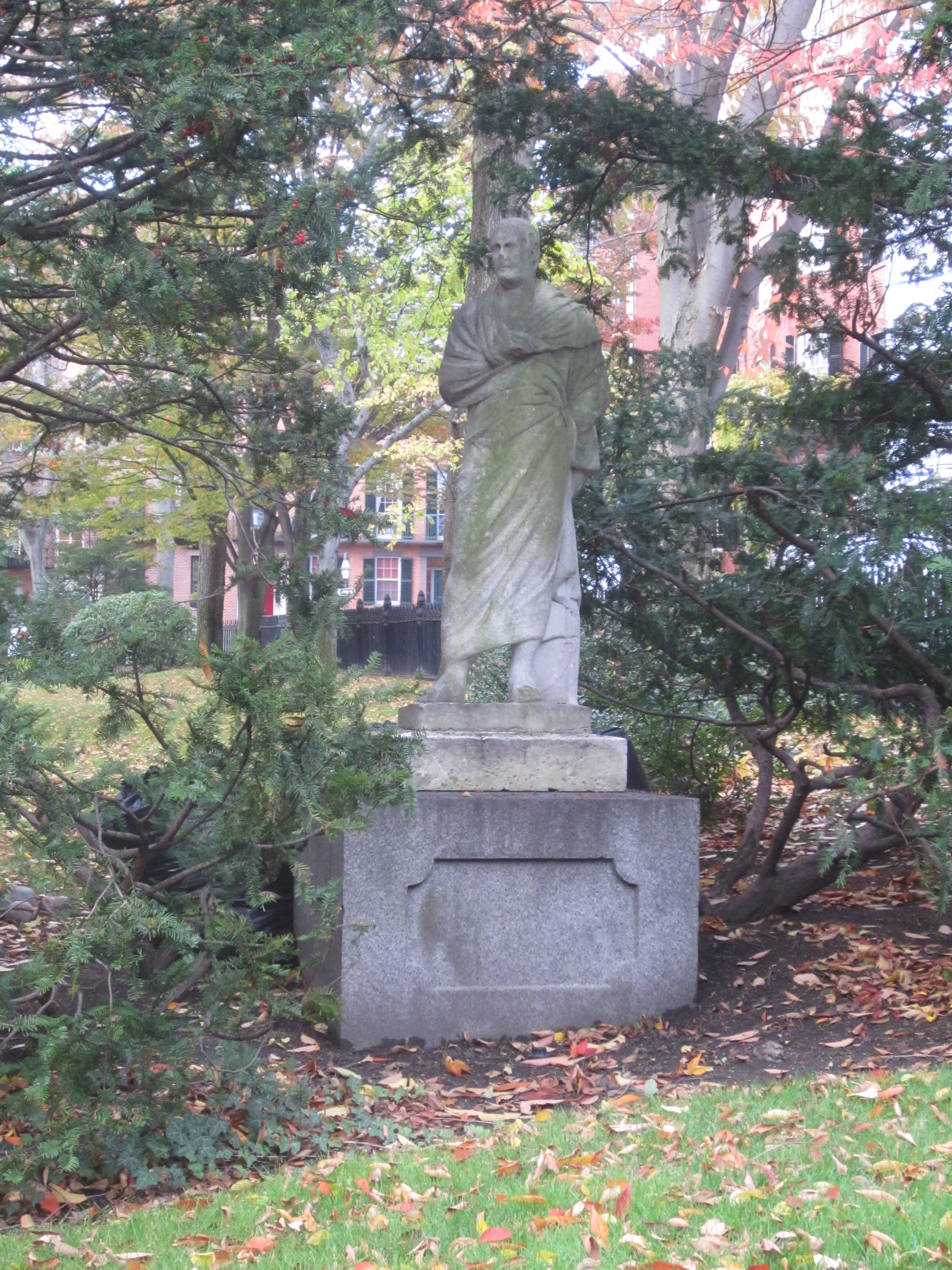
- Statue of Aristides in Boston, United States
- Native name: Ἀριστείδης
- Born: 530 BC
- Died: 468 BC (aged c. 62)
- Allegiance: Athens
- Service years: 490 – 479 BC
- Conflicts: First Persian invasion of Greece; Battle of Marathon; Second Persian invasion of Greece; First Battle of Salamis; First Battle of Plataea

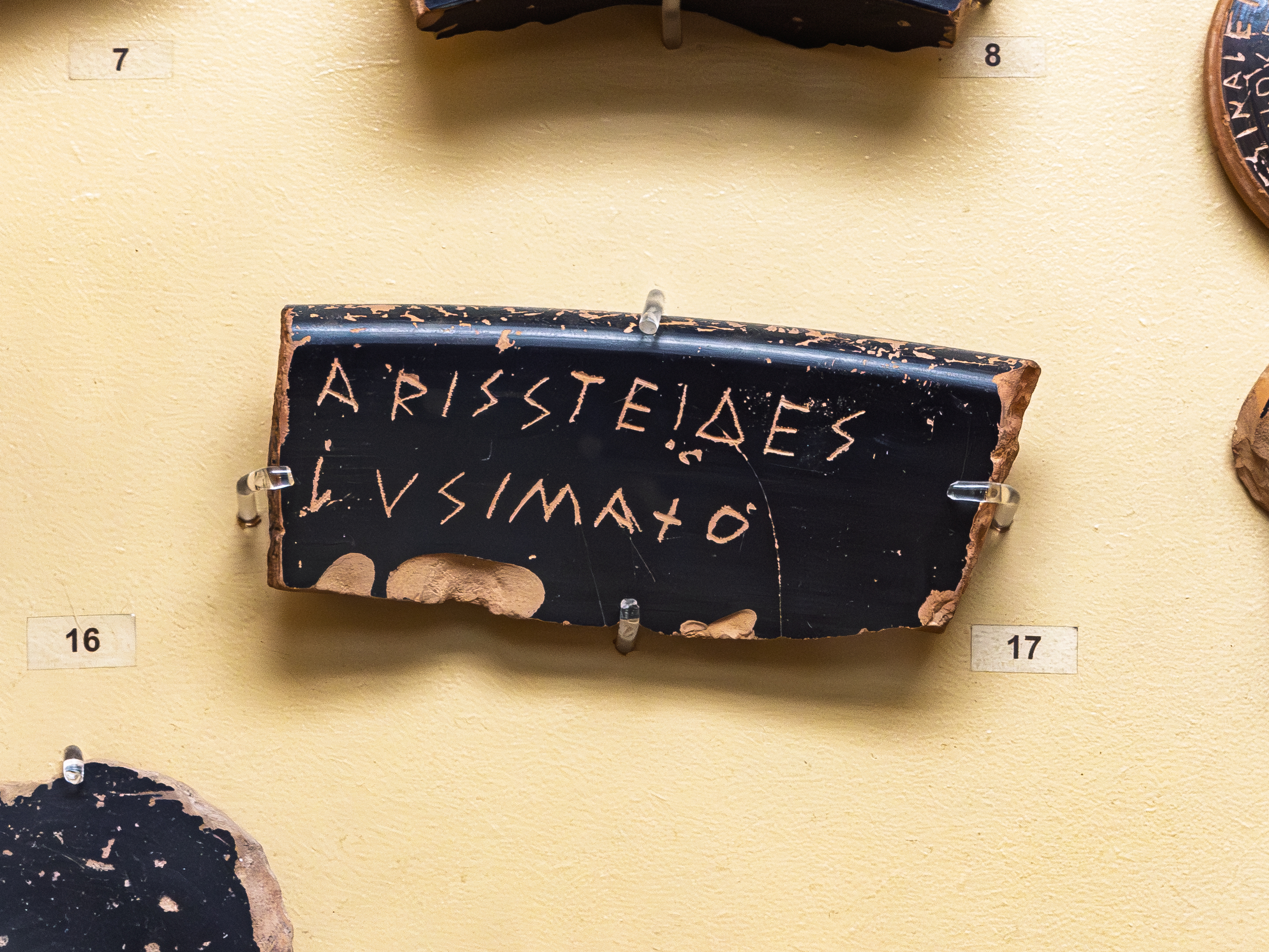
An ostrakon bearing the name "Aristeides [son] of Lysimachus", displayed in the Ancient Agora Museum in Athens

Aristides (/ˌærɪˈstaɪdiːz/ ARR-ih-STY-deez; Ancient Greek: Ἀριστείδης, romanized: Aristeídēs, Attic Greek: [aristěːdɛːs]; 530–468 BC) was an ancient Athenian statesman. Nicknamed "the Just" (δίκαιος, díkaios), he flourished at the beginning of Athens' Classical period and is remembered for his generalship in the Persian War. The ancient historian Herodotus cited him as "the best and most honourable man in Athens", and he received similarly reverent treatment in Plato's Socratic dialogues.

== Biography ==
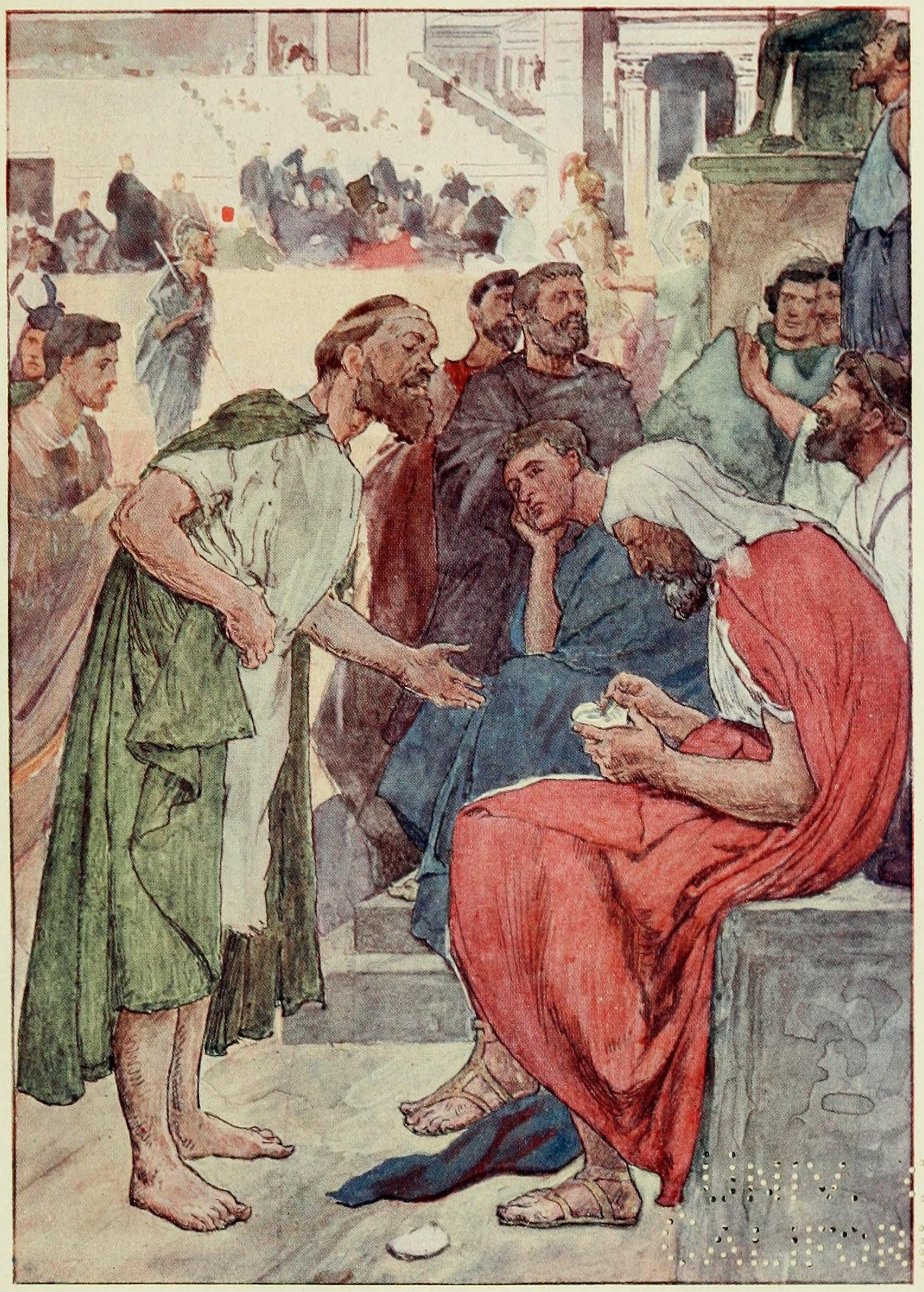
Aristides and the citizens

Aristides was a member of a family of moderate fortune; his father's name was Lysimachus. Early in life he became a follower of the statesman Cleisthenes. He probably first came to notice as strategos in command of his native tribe Antiochis at the Battle of Marathon of 490 BC. In consequence of the distinction which he then achieved he is said to have won the election as archon eponymos for the ensuing year (489–488). Pursuing a conservative policy to maintain Athens as a land power, he was one of the chief opponents of the naval policy proposed by Themistocles.

According to Plutarch, citing the philosopher Ariston of Ceos, the rivalry between Aristides and Themistocles began in their youth when they competed over the love of a boy: "... they were rivals for the affection of the beautiful Stesilaus of Ceos, and were passionate beyond all moderation." The conflict between the two leaders ended in the ostracism of Aristides at a date variously given between 485 and 482 BC. It is said that, on this occasion, an illiterate voter who did not recognise Aristides approached the statesman and requested that he write the name of Aristides on his voting shard to ostracize him. The latter asked if Aristides had wronged him. "No," was the reply, "and I do not even know him, but it irritates me to hear him everywhere called 'the Just'." Aristides then wrote his own name on the ballot.

Early in 480, Aristides profited by the decree recalling exiles to help in the defence of Athens against Persian invaders, and was elected strategos for the year 480–479 BC. In the Battle of Salamis of September 480 BC, he gave loyal support to Themistocles, and crowned the victory by landing Athenian infantry on the island of Psyttaleia and annihilating the Persian garrison stationed there.

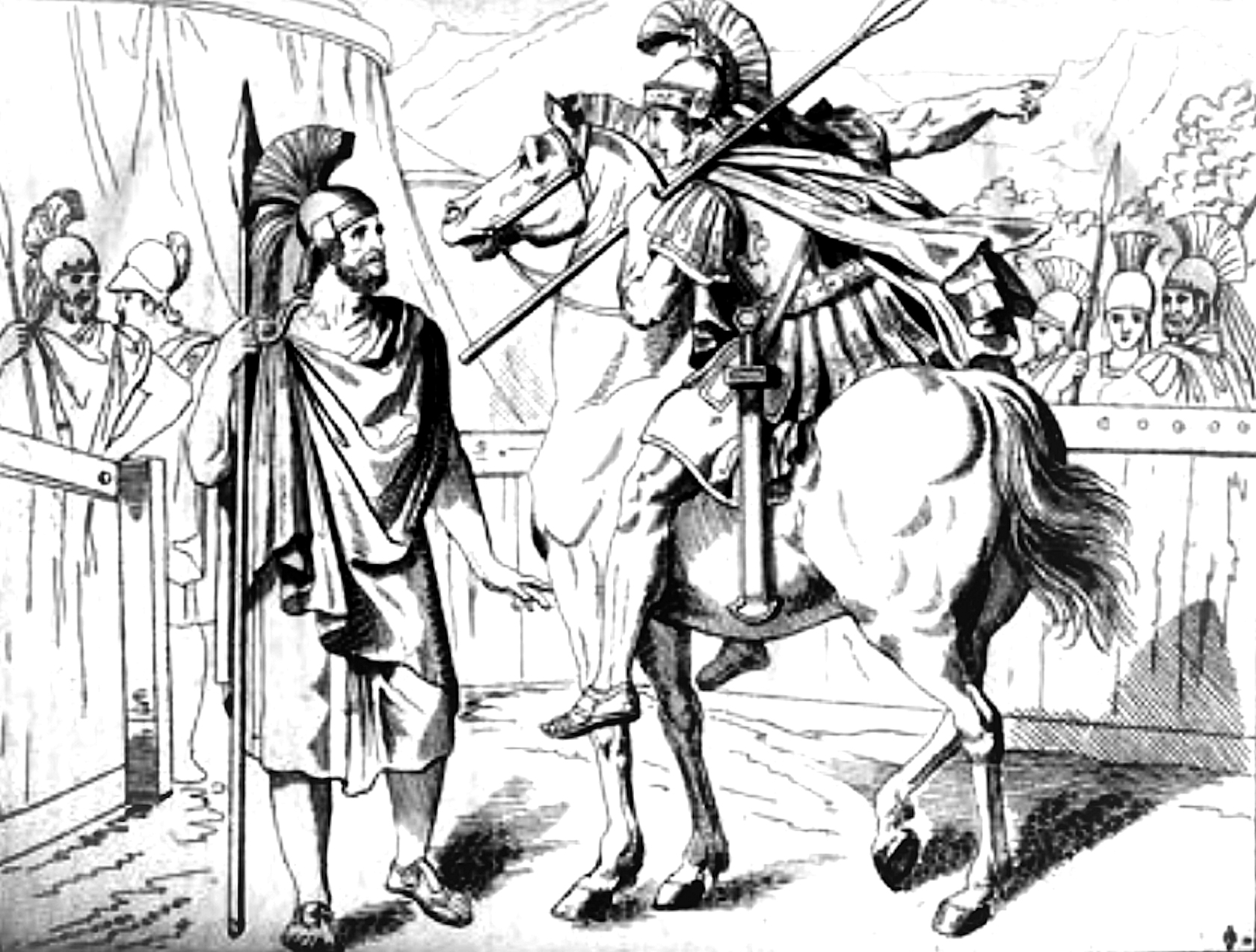
Aristides warned by Alexander I of Macedon of the impending Persian attack at the Battle of Plataea, 479 BC

In 479 BC, he was re-elected strategos, and given special powers as commander of the Athenian forces at the Battle of Plataea of August 479 BC; he is also said to have suppressed a conspiracy among some in the army. He so won the confidence of the Ionian allies that, after they had revolted from the Spartan admiral Pausanias, they gave him the chief command and left him with absolute discretion in fixing the contributions of the newly formed (478 BC) confederacy, the Delian League. His assessment, universally accepted as equitable, continued as the basis of taxation for the greater part of the League's duration. He continued to hold a predominant position in Athens. At first he seems to have remained on good terms with Themistocles, whom he allegedly helped in outwitting the Spartans over the rebuilding of the walls of Athens.

Some authorities state that Aristides died at Athens, others that he perished on a journey to the Black Sea; the date of his death is given by Nepos as 468 BC. He lived to witness the ostracism of Themistocles, towards whom he always displayed generosity, but he died before the rise of Pericles. His estate seems to have suffered severely from the Persian invasions, for apparently he did not leave enough money to defray the expenses of his burial, and it is known that his descendants – even in the 4th century – received state pensions.

== Authorities ==
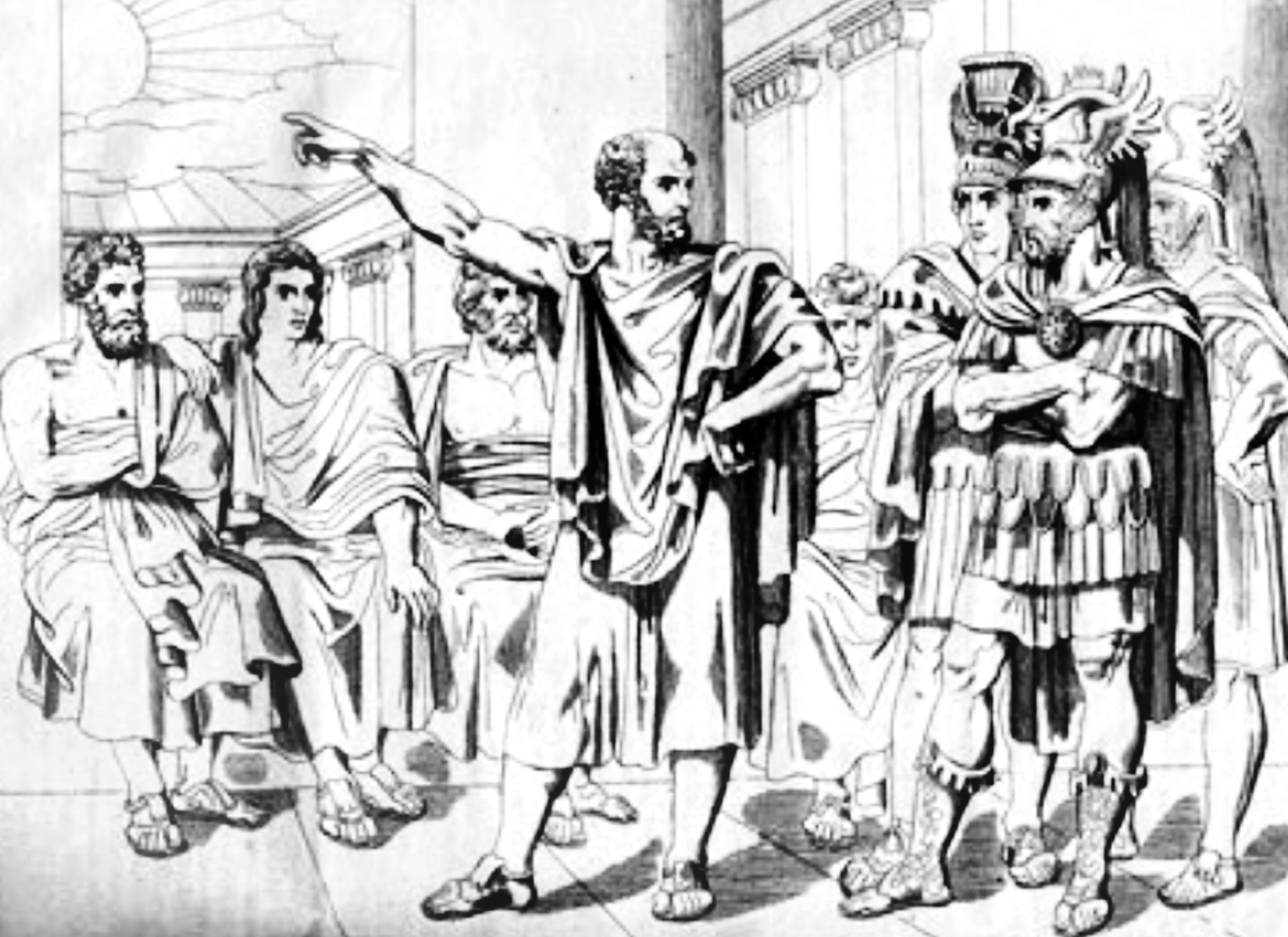
Answer of Aristides to the ambassadors of Mardonius.

Herodotus is not the only ancient author to evaluate Aristides' life. He is also the subject of one of Plutarch's Parallel Lives (in which he is compared to Cato the Elder), although Plutarch, writing during the Roman Empire, was several centuries removed. Aristides is praised by Socrates in Plato's dialogues Gorgias and Meno as an exceptional instance of good leadership.

In Plato's dialogue Theaetetus, Socrates refers to Aristides, the grandson of the famous Aristides, less positively, bringing him as an example of a student who leaves his care too soon and realizes later that he is a fool.

== Memorials and representations ==
There is a statue of Aristides in Louisburg Square in the American city of Boston. An 1806 painting of Aristides by Charles Brocas is at the Musée des Augustins in the French City of Toulouse.

== Bibliography ==
- Brun, Patrice (2023). Aristide 'le Juste'. L'art et la manière de fabriquer un héros dans la cité démocratique. Scripta antiqua, 175. Bordeaux: Ausonius Éditions, ISBN 9782356135902.
- Lang, Anna (2015). Aristeides der ‚Gerechte‘ – sein Archontat und seine Rolle bei Marathon, in R. Lafer & K. Strobel (eds.) Antike Lebenswelten. Althistorische und papyrologische Studien (Berlin/Boston 2015) 212–222.
- Macgregor Morris, Ian (2022). “Aristeides the Just?”, in A. Konecny & N. Sekunda (eds.) The Battle of Plataiai 479 BC (Vienna 2022) 133-49.
- Proietti, Giorgia (2015). "War and Memory: the Battle of Psyttaleia Before Herodotus’ Histories", Bulletin of the Institute of Classical Studies 58 (2015) 43– 54.
- Torello, Giulia (2008). "The Resurrection of Aristeides, Miltiades, Solon and Perikles in Eupolis’ Demes", Antichthon 42 (2008) 40– 55.
- Tuci, Paolo A. (2018). "Aristide 'imperialista' nell’Athenaion Politeia aristotelica", in C. Bearzot – M. Canevaro – T. Gargiulo – E. Poddighe (eds.), Athenaion Politeiai tra storia, politica e sociologia: Aristotele e Pseudo-Senofonte (Milan 2018) 231–251.
- Zaccarini, Matteo (2020). "Aristide il Giusto e l’arche ateniese: la giustizia al potere", Rivista di Filologia e Istruzione Classica 148 (2020) 5–33.
