= Montcalm and Wolfe =

Montcalm and Wolfe is the sixth volume in Francis Parkman's seven-volume history, France and England in North America, originally published in 1884. It tells the story of the French and Indian War. Its title refers to Louis-Joseph de Montcalm and James Wolfe, the commanding generals of the French and English forces respectively and to whom the book devotes particular attention. Parkman considered the book his masterpiece.

It was republished in 1983, along with the other six volumes, in a two-volume unabridged version with notes by David Levin (Library of America). A centennial edition was published in 1984 by Atheneum, New York City, with a foreword by C. Vann Woodward. The Atheneum edition was republished in 1995 by Da Capo Press, New York City.

== See also ==
- Henri-Raymond Casgrain
