= The Oregon Trail: Sketches of Prairie and Rocky-Mountain Life =

1849 book by Francis Parkman

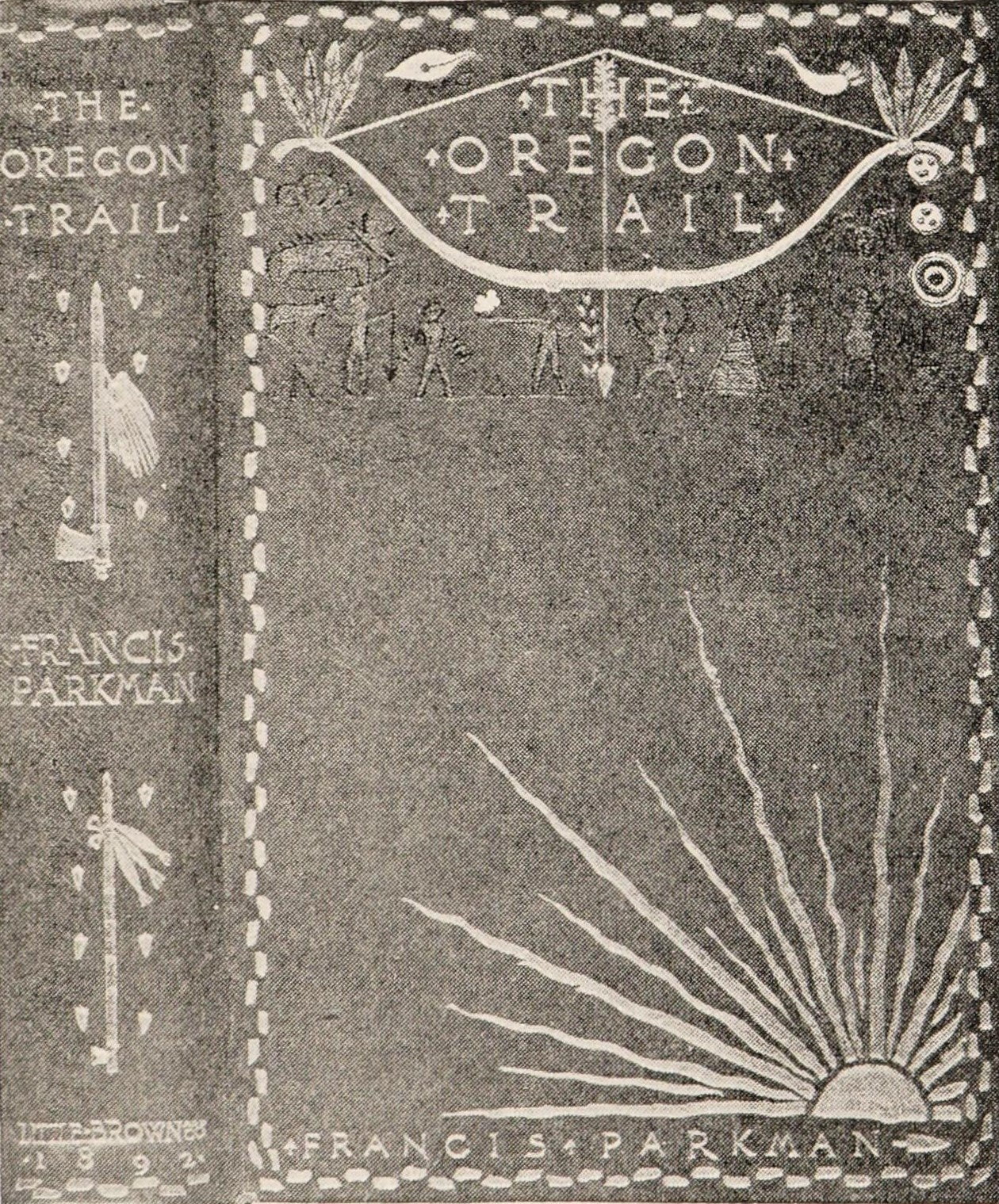
- Author: Francis Parkman
- Set in: United States
- Publication date: 1849

The Oregon Trail: Sketches of Prairie and Rocky Mountain Life (also published as The California & Oregon Trail) is a book written by Francis Parkman. It was initially serialized in twenty-one installments in Knickerbocker's Magazine (1847–49) and subsequently published as a book in 1849. The book is a first-person account of a 2-month summer tour in 1846 of the U.S. states of Nebraska, Wyoming, Colorado, and Kansas. Parkman was 23 at the time. The heart of the book covers the three weeks Parkman spent hunting buffalo with a band of Oglala Sioux. Some later printings such as the 18th edition (Holt, Rinehart, and Winston, 1969) included illustrations by James Daugherty. The film The Big Trail adapted the novel which had John Wayne in his first main role.

== Reception ==
The book was reviewed favorably by Herman Melville. However, he complains that it demeaned American Indians and its title was misleading (the book covers only the first third of the trail).

The Oregon Trail appeared in 1849, and with its publication, Parkman was launched upon his career as a storyteller without peer in American letters. ... It is the picturesqueness, the racy vigor, the poetic elegance, the youthful excitement, that give The Oregon Trail its enduring appeal, recreating for us, as perhaps does no other book in our literature, the wonder and beauty of life in a new world that is now old and but a memory.

— Historian Henry Steele Commager

== Comic Book Version ==
In June 1950 the Gilberton Company published a comic book version of The Oregon Trail as No. 72 in its Classics Illustrated series, with illustrations of Henry C. Kiefer.
