= Louis Gustave Mouchel =

Founder of Mouchel (1852-1908)

- Born: 11 January 1852; Cherbourg
- Died: 27 May 1908 (aged 56); Cherbourg

Louis Gustave Mouchel (11 January 1852 – 27 May 1908) was the founder of Mouchel, one of the United Kingdom's largest engineering consultancies.

== Career ==
Born and educated in Cherbourg, Mouchel trained as a naval officer and then as an engineer at the Government School of Mines. He then joined the Department of Highways.

In 1875, he moved to Briton Ferry in Wales and formed the Cardiff Washed Coal & Fuel Company. He became the agent for a system of reinforced concrete developed by François Hennebique which he referred to as ferroconcrete.

In 1907 he founded L. G. Mouchel which subsequently became one of the United Kingdom's largest engineering consultancies.

== Death ==
He spent most of his adult life in the United Kingdom but died in Cherbourg in 1908.

He never married.
