= The Jesuits in North America in the Seventeenth Century =

1867 history book on the Jesuits in New France

The Jesuits in North America in the Seventeenth Century is the second volume in Francis Parkman's seven-volume history, France and England in North America, originally published in 1867. It tells the story of the French Jesuit missionaries in Canada, then New France, starting from their arrival in 1632.

The book was re-published in 1912 by Little, Brown and Company, Boston. It was republished in 1983, along with the other six volumes, in a two-volume unabridged version with notes by David Levin (Library of America). The Little, Brown edition was reprinted by Bison Books, Lincoln, Nebraska in 1997 with a new introduction by Conrad Heidenreich and José António Brandão.

== Composition and Sources ==
The book is largely sourced from the writings of François Le Mercier, a principal member of the Jesuit mission to New France who held the title of Rector at the Jesuit college in Quebec and the General Superior of the missions in New France from 1653 to 1656 and again from 1665 to 1671 when he was appointed procurator and primary of the Jesuit college in Quebec which he held for a year before returning to France. Le Mercier left a large amount of records, most included in the series Relations of the Jesuits. They consist of letters or extracts of letters, as well as short stories or parts of stories from his hand.

Other sources and background information are drawn from a range of French letters and articles from the era as well as historical documents. The book refers often to the writings of French explorer Samuel de Champlain who was the first to explore New France and encounter the Huron people.
