= Parkman Group =

Engineering firm

- Company type: Public
- Industry: Engineering consultants
- Founded: 1888
- Defunct: 2003
- Fate: Merged with Mouchel
- Successor: Mouchel
- Headquarters: Sutton Coldfield, UK
- Key people: Richard Archer, (Chairman)

Parkman Group plc was a British engineering consultancy firm. It merged with Mouchel in September 2003.

Established as Ward Ashcroft in 1888 with an early focus on water and public health matters, it became Ward Ashcroft and Parkman in the mid-20th century and steadily grew. The company became involved in the public housing and commercial property sectors during the 1990s, as well as the railways and outsourcing opportunities; however, it intentionally spurned the larger Private Finance Initiative (PFI) contracts available. Parkman Group underwent a management buyout in 2000 and a floatation on the London Stock Exchange one year later.

== History ==
The consulting practice Ward Ashcroft was founded in Liverpool in 1888, predominantly as a water and public health business. In 1948, Brigadier Claude Charles Parkman joined the firm, after which it was rebranded as Ward Ashcroft and Parkman. The company was involved in various undertakings around Liverpool, ranging from the development of the Royal Albert Dock to working with Liverpool University to implement computers into engineering design.

From the mid-1990s, Parkman moved into public sector property and housing, starting with the London Borough of Bexley; in 1996, the firm received a Queens Award for Export Achievement.

In May 2000, the company, which had been previously owned by a mixture of management and staff, underwent a £10 million management buyout, which included six directors and was led by Parkman's former chairman Richard Archer. Throughout the early 2000s, the firm's turnover became increasingly sourced from outsourcing commissions from the public sector.

During 2001, Parkman Group was floated on the London Stock Exchange; at the time, it stated that the additional capital would be used to pay down the debts accumulated from the management buyout as well as to finance the company's future expansion.

In response to difficulties hiring engineers in the UK, the company launched a recruitment drive in Australia in 2001. That same year, Parkman Group opted to disengage with the commercial property sector, as well as to not involve itself with large Private Finance Initiative (PFI) contracts.

In 2002, Parkman was named Financial Times New Company of the Year. One year later, it was also named as one of the Sunday Times Top 100 Best Companies to Work For.

During June 2003, having seen its share value slump by 50 percent over a twelve month period and seeking to complete further acquisitions, Parkman Group increased its overdraft to £3 million amongst other measures. Acquisitions completed by Parkman Group around this time included the education consultant Full Circle in May 2002, and the lighting design consultancy Atkins Odlin in July 2003. Around this time, Parkman Group was awarded a ten year contract by Network Rail, valued between £25m and £30m, to undertake the inspection of the latter's structural assets.

Mouchel plc and Parkman Group plc announced plans to merge on 21 August 2003. One month later, this transaction was completed, forming the new company, Mouchel Parkman plc. A single trading company, Mouchel Parkman Services Limited, was created on 1 April 2004.
