= France and England in North America =

Multi-volume work by Francis Parkman

France and England in North America (ISBN 1-425-56179-9) is a multi-volume history of the European colonization of North America, written by Francis Parkman and published between 1865 and 1892, which highlights the military struggles between France and Great Britain. It was well regarded at the time of publication, and continues to enjoy a reputation as a literary masterpiece.

The separate volumes, and the dates of first publication, are:

- Pioneers of France in the New World (1865)
- The Jesuits in North America in the Seventeenth Century (1867)
- The Discovery of the Great West (1869) (Revised and republished as La Salle and the Discovery of the Great West in 1879)
- The Old Regime in Canada (1874)
- Count Frontenac and New France under Louis XIV (1877)
- Montcalm and Wolfe (1884)
- A Half-Century of Conflict (1892)

A single-volume condensed version, edited by John Tebbel, was published in 1948 as The Battle for North America.

A two-volume unabridged version, with notes by David Levin, was published in 1983 by the Library of America as France and England in North America.
