= Mouchel =

UK business services company

Mouchel Group
- Type: Division of WSP Global
- Industry: Professional support services; technical consulting and business services
- Founded: 1897
- Headquarters: Export House, Woking, United Kingdom
- Key people: Phil White (Chairman); Haydn Mursell (Chief Executive)
- Services: Highways and transportation, local government, property, emergency services, health, education and utilities.
- Revenue: £616.6 million (Y/E Sept 2014)
- Net income: £24.2 million (exceptional items - £69.6 million)(Y/E Sept 2014)
- Number of employees: >6,500 (Y/E Sept 2014)
- Website: www.mouchel.com

Mouchel Group, originally known as L. G. Mouchel & Partners Ltd, was an infrastructure and business services company headquartered in Woking, United Kingdom. It provided advisory, design, project delivery and managed services associated with infrastructure and business services across the highways and transportation, local government, emergency services, property, health, education and utility markets across the world.

In June 2015, Mouchel was purchased by Kier Group for £265 million. This transaction included both the Mouchel Infrastructure Services and Mouchel Business Services divisions. Subsequently, Mouchel Infrastructure Services was rebranded as Mouchel Consulting, with the Business Services sector falling under the Kier brand. Grant Rumbles stepped down as CEO with Haydn Mursell, CEO of Kier Group, assuming the role. Kier sold Mouchel Consulting to WSP Global in October 2016, after which the Mouchel name ceased to be used.

== History ==
=== Early history ===
The company traced its routed back to L. G. Mouchel & Partners Ltd, which was founded in Briton Ferry in 1897 by Louis Gustave Mouchel. Mouchel had been a recent arrival to Britain, having come from France with a licence to use the new technique of reinforcing concrete using iron bars that had been developed by François Hennebique.

During the first half of the twentieth century, Mouchel developed into a consulting engineering practice. Early work undertaken by the firm included advising on the Royal Liver Building in Liverpool, Reading Bridge in Reading, London's Earls Court and Royal Victoria Dock, and football stands for Liverpool Football Club and Manchester City Football Club. The company also designed the cooling towers for London landmark Battersea Power Station.

Southbank House in Lambeth, London, formerly served as the company's headquarters after it relocated there in 1960.

In the 1980s, in light of the growing practices of both privatisation and outsourcing in the UK, Mouchel moved into advising local authorities on competitive tendering.

=== Expansion ===
During June 2002, Mouchel was floated on the London Stock Exchange.

The capital generated from the floatation was promptly used by Mouchel plc to finance numerous acquisitions; these included the e-government and ICT specialists Lloyd Davies Associates plc in April 2003, and the gas engineering consultancy GEL Group Limited in August 2003.

In August 2003, Mouchel plc and Parkman Group plc (founded in 1888) announced plans to merge. One month later, this merger was completed, the unified company became Mouchel Parkman plc. A single trading company, Mouchel Parkman Services Limited, was created on 1 April 2004. Strong fiscal performance was recorded around this period.

The first acquisition completed as a merged company took place in May 2005, when Mouchel Parkman bought mainline engineering and installation specialists ServiRail. The acquisition allowed Mouchel Parkman to move into mainline engineering works, which included safety-related upgrades to the Channel Tunnel. In December 2007, the company publicly criticised limitations in the tendering opportunities being provided by Britain's railway infrastructure owner Network Rail.

On 16 November 2006, it announced a trio of acquisitions worth a total value of £50 million – project management and organisational change specialist Hornagold and Hills, water and utilities consultancy Ewan Group plc, and software and system solutions company Traffic Support Limited (TSL). The acquisitions had combined revenues of £30 million and increased the group's staffing by nearly 500.

Its last acquisition under the Mouchel Parkman brand took place on 7 August 2007, when it purchased business process outsourcing (BPO) and IT group HBS, formerly Hyder Business Services, for £46.24 million from private equity firm Terra Firma. Prior to this transaction, the two companies had previously worked together, such as on a £300 million 12-year strategic services arrangement with Oldham Metropolitan Borough Council, called the Unity Partnership, which commenced in April 2007.

On 16 October 2007, Mouchel Parkman rebranded as 'Mouchel', changing its stance from being a 'professional support services group' to a 'consulting and business services group'. The change was designed to be more inclusive of its expanded business outsourcing division, following the purchase of HBS, rather than being a traditional technical and engineering consultancy.

Mouchel's first acquisition as a rebranded company was that of UK public sector management consultant Hedra, for £50 million in March 2008. This transaction added around 200 staff to Mouchel's management consultancy business, as well as two new service areas – 'solutions', such as enterprise content management (ECM), enterprise resource planning (ERP) and electronic document and records management (EDRM), and 'managed services', which involves process and technology services across multi-year service agreement contracts.

=== Financial difficulties and breakup ===
By late 2010, the company had been negatively impacted by government spending cuts, recording a £14.7m pre-tax loss for the year and compelling it to seek additional financing. While Costain Group and Interserve launched talks to acquire Mouchel in late 2010, the company spurned their bids as being undervalued and both firms abandoned had their efforts by April 2011.

The early 2010s saw particularly poor performance for Mouchel; issues experienced included accounting errors, contract mistakes, failed takeover attempts, and a debt burden of £100 million. In response, the company's share value dropped sharply throughout 2012. In August 2012, Mouchel was delisted from the London Stock Exchange, went into administration, and its ownership was transferred to MRBL, a company owned by Barclays Bank, Royal Bank of Scotland, Lloyds Bank and Mouchel's management. By that point, the value of Mouchel shares had fallen to zero.

During July 2014, Mouchel was reportedly investigating options for its sale or floatation. In December of that year, the private equity company Bridgepoint announced that it was entered the bidding for Mouchel.

During April 2015, Kier Group confirmed that it would take over Mouchel in exchange for £265 million. Following the transaction, the company was broken up, which included the sale of Mouchel Consulting onto WSP UK in exchange for £75 million.

== Operations ==
Mouchel provided managerial, commercial and technical expertise to clients in the public sector and regulated industry, and to a lesser extent the private sector. Clients employed Mouchel to assist with strategy, services, and both people and asset management. Operations included highways, water, property, housing, education, management consultancy and 'business process outsourcing' in a wide range of disciplines.

According to New Civil Engineer magazine's Consultants File 2011, Mouchel was then the second largest provider of UK public sector outsourced services and the second largest technical consultant in roads in the UK.

=== Business process outsourcing ===
Mouchel's business process outsourcing 2010 - 2014 Manchester operated Citibank to Opus Mastercard transfer, business works with local authority clients in the UK to operate back-office support services. Its key partnerships are with Bath & North East Somerset Council, Lincolnshire County Council, Middlesbrough Council, Milton Keynes Council and Oldham Metropolitan Borough Council and Bournemouth Borough Council.

=== Education ===
Mouchel's education business provides services for individual schools, groups of schools and local authorities, as well as local authority support for the UK government's 'Every Child Matters' agenda, which seeks to improve the outcomes for children. In October 2007 its 50:50 joint venture with Babcock – mpb education – was named preferred bidder by the London Borough of Hackney to deliver its £167 million Building Schools for the Future (BSF) programme.

=== Highways ===
Mouchel's highways business is one of the UK's leading highways companies. Its services range from the planning and design of major capital projects to the maintenance and management of congested road networks; the business manages, maintains and improves more than 60,000 km of motorways and trunk roads throughout the UK. Highways-related work represents a third of the group's turnover.

=== Housing ===
Mouchel's housing business was one of the UK's first providers to deliver externalised housing management services. These include rent arrears recovery, repairs management, major works, estates services and the management of supported housing units for the elderly. Its only current contract involves managing council housing stock across eight electoral wards in Hackney, from neighbourhood offices in Homerton and De Beauvoir and Queensbridge, on behalf of Hackney Homes – the company launched and owned by the London Borough of Hackney in April 2006.

=== International ===
Mouchel's international business employs around 420 professional staff and is primarily based in the Middle East, with two offices in Dubai and one in both Abu Dhabi and Kuwait. The company also has two offices in Africa; Nairobi and Cape Town. In 2007, it had a turnover of £28 million, the majority of which derived from its work in the United Arab Emirates. Its major clients include Nakheel, Aldar, Dubai Festival City and Dubai Municipality, to which it provides project management, engineering design and landscape design services. In Australia, Mouchel's highways maintenance joint venture - DownerMouchel - was awarded three Western Australian highway maintenance contracts worth £138m to Mouchel over five years.

=== Land and environment ===
Mouchel's land and environment business provides land remediation, geotechnical engineering and environmental planning.

The business also includes a division called LandAspects, which provides geographic information systems, topographic surveys, web-based applications and compulsory purchase services.

=== Management consulting ===
Mouchel's management consultancy business employs more than 300 professional staff who specialise in procurement and project management. This involves technical, financial and commercial advice for all stages of project work. Typical services include PFI advice, due diligence, options appraisal, compliance monitoring, business case preparation, risk management, project definition, facilities management and stakeholder consultation. The sectors it is involved with include defence, law and order, schools, health, waste, social housing, nuclear, roads and rail.

Its size was more than doubled by two acquisitions – project management and organisational change specialist Hornagold and Hills in November 2006, and UK public sector management consulting business Hedra in March 2008.

=== Property ===
Mouchel's property business provides procurement, asset management, design maintenance, architectural design, building surveying, project management, and valuation and estate management services. According to New Civil Engineer magazine's Consultants File 2008, Mouchel is the largest provider of facilities management in the UK.

Its key clients are local authorities, with the business being responsible for one of the largest public property portfolios in the UK, including more than 2,200 schools and 4,000 other public buildings.

=== Regeneration ===
With UK local government moving towards larger contracts over longer periods of time covering a broad range of activities, Mouchel has established a number of 'strategic partnerships' with the councils of Liverpool, Knowsley, Oldham and Rochdale. These provide a bundle of property and support services to the cities over a number of years.

=== Waste ===
Mouchel's waste business provides specialist waste management consultancy services to private and public sector clients in a variety of areas. These include developing and implementing sustainable municipal waste strategies and providing services for all stages of a waste project's lifecycle – from strategy and procurement, through to design, planning, licensing and project management.

=== Water ===
Mouchel's water business provides a wide range of water services to public and private companies, both in the UK and overseas. At the end of 2006, following Mouchel's acquisition of Ewan Group, it was the third largest water consultant in the UK behind MWH Europe and Mott MacDonald Group according to New Civil Engineer magazine's Consultants File 2008. It holds more than 40 framework contracts and employs more than 50 people across 16 offices.
