= Pakman =

Pakman is a surname. Notable people with the surname include:

- David Pakman (born 1984), Argentine-American host, political commentator, and YouTube personality
- David B. Pakman (born 1969), internet entrepreneur and venture capitalist

== See also ==
- Parkman
- Akman
- Pac-Man (disambiguation)
