= Louisburg Square =

Street in Boston, Massachusetts, United States

Coordinates: 42°21′30.35″N 71°04′07.08″W

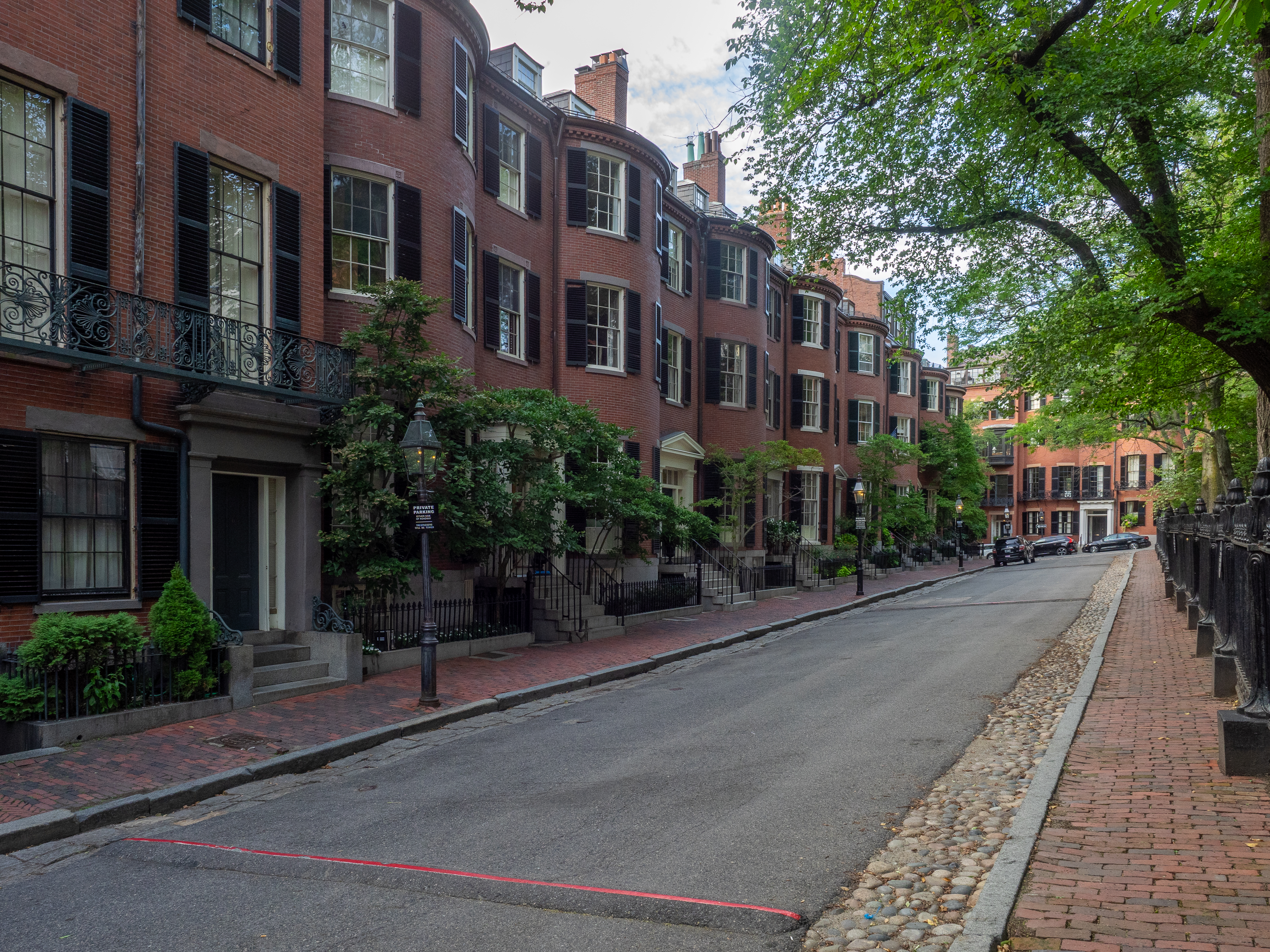
- Interactive map of Louisburg Square
- Location: Boston, Massachusetts, U.S.
- North end: Pinckney Street
- South end: Mount Vernon Street

Louisburg Square is a street in the Beacon Hill neighborhood of Boston, Massachusetts, bisected by a small private park. The park, which is bounded by Pinckney Street to the north and Mount Vernon Street to the south, is maintained by the Louisburg Square Proprietors. While the Proprietors pay taxes to the City of Boston, the city does not own the park or its garden.

Louisburg Square was named for the 1745 Battle of Louisbourg, in which Massachusetts militiamen led by William Pepperrell, who was made the first American baronet for his role, sacked the French Fortress of Louisbourg. Louisburg Square has become one of the most exclusive neighborhoods in the United States, with townhouses listing for over $15,000,000.

== Description ==
The park itself is a small grassy oval surrounded by a wrought-iron fence; there is no public access. There is a statue of Christopher Columbus at the north end, and of Aristides the Just at the south end.

== History and residents ==
The Greek Revival houses around the square reflect the rarefied privilege enjoyed by the 19th-century upper class in Beacon Hill. The square was surveyed in the 1820s, and the houses around it were designed and built between 1834 and 1847. One of the last private residences built on Louisburg Square was 2 Louisburg Square, built in 1847 for wealthy merchant and philanthropist Thomas Handasyd Perkins Jr., known as "Short-Arm Tom", who lived at 1 Joy Street. Among the famous people who lived there in the 19th century were Atlantic Monthly editor William Dean Howells, architect Charles Bulfinch, painter John Singleton Copley, and teacher A. Bronson Alcott and his daughter, author Louisa May Alcott (who died there). Jenny Lind was married in the parlor of a house on Louisburg Square.

As of 2014, it is one of the most expensive residential neighborhoods in the USA; townhouses on Louisburg Square sold for $11.5 million in 2011 and $11 million in 2012, for instance. The square is often included in walking tours and guidebooks. Former U.S. Secretary of State John Kerry and his wife Theresa Heinz, own the townhouse at 19 Louisburg Square.

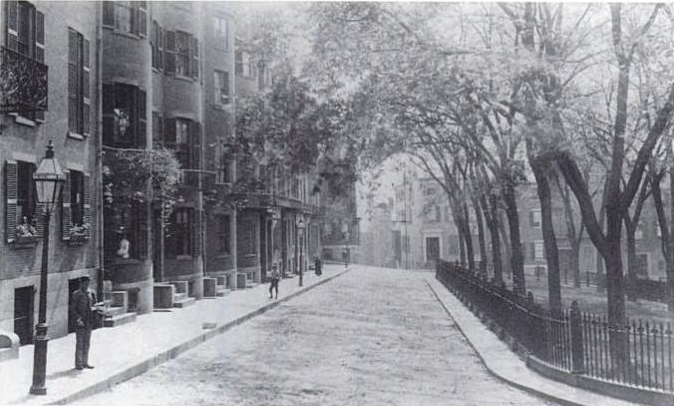
Looking south from Pinckney Street, c. 1880s

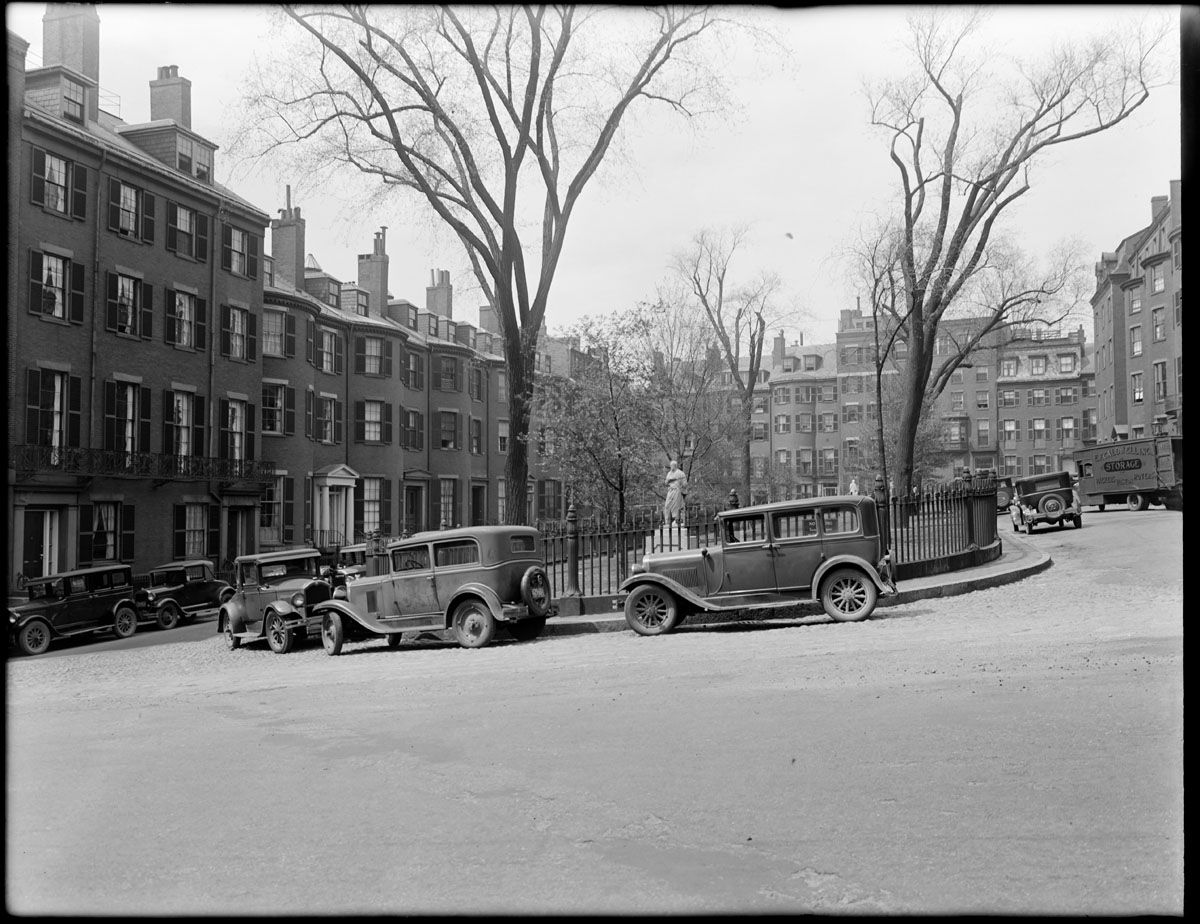
View north from Mount Vernon Street, c. 1930

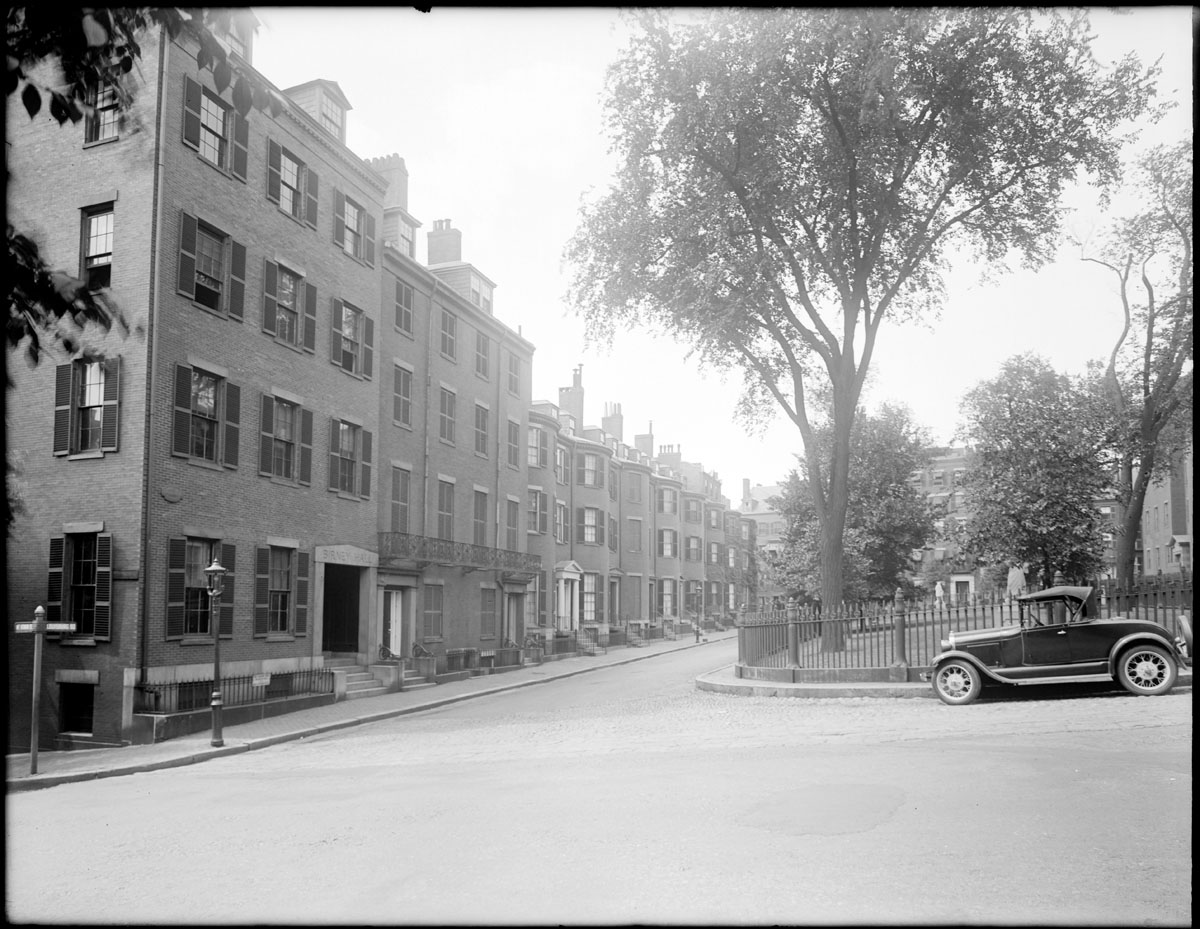
Southwestern corner of the square, at Mount Vernon Street, c. 1930

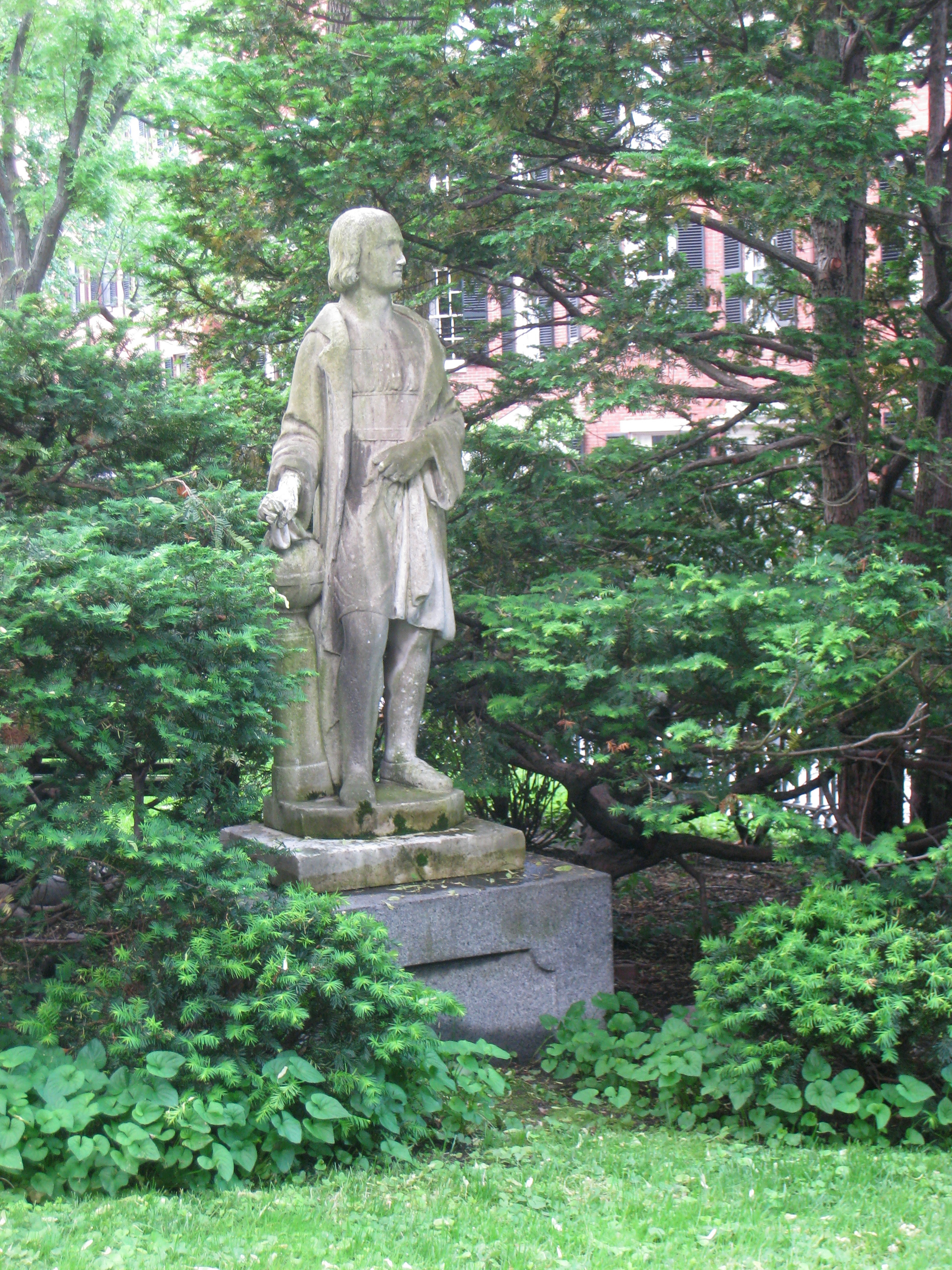
Statue of Christopher Columbus, 2009

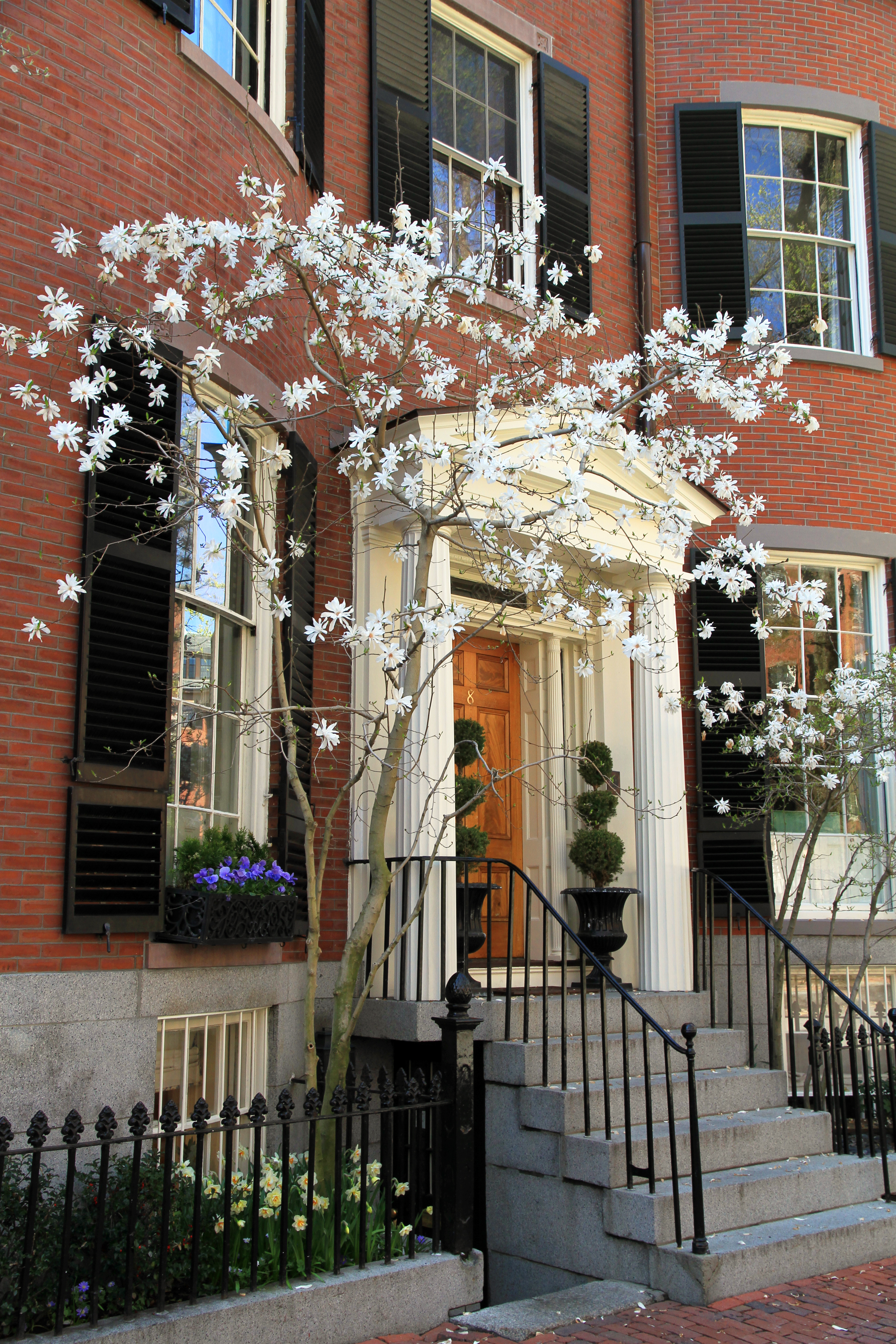
8 Louisburg Square, on the park's western side, 2013. The home, built in 1899, was valued at around $7 million in 2024
