= Nuriye Akman =

Turkish journalist, columnist, and novelist

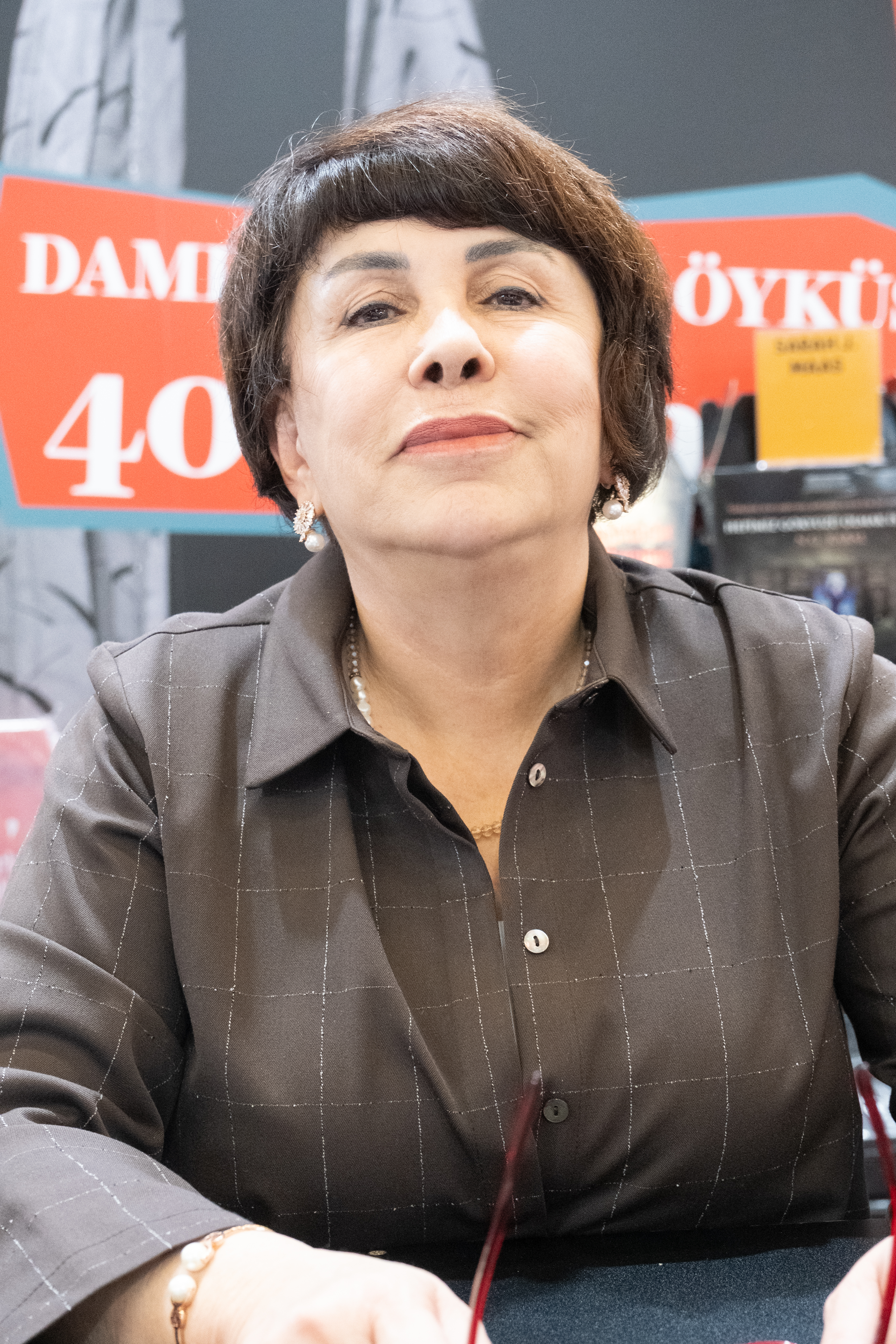
- Born: 1957 (age 68–69); Samsun, Turkey
- Education: Gazi University
- Occupation: Journalist
- Awards: 1998 Turkey Journalists Association achievement award (for her interviews); 2007 Turkish Writers Association award (for her novels)
- Website: nuriyeakman.net

Nuriye Akman (born 1957) is a Turkish journalist, columnist, and novelist who is especially known for her interviewing prominent figures in Turkish politics and culture.

She was detained as part of the investigation into the military coup attempt on 15 July 2016, subsequently arrested 30 August 2016 and released pending trial on 12 October 2016. On 6 July 2018, Akman was acquitted of all charges.

== Career ==
After working as a clerk for Sümerbank for three years, she became a journalist for Milliyet in 1982. Between 1985 and 1993 she worked at Hürriyet and between 1993 and 2002 at Sabah newspapers. In 2004, he gave a lecture on interviewing techniques at Bahçeşehir University. She produced and anchored programs İnci Avcısı for the Turkish Radio and Television Corporation (TRT) and Empati for SkyTürk. More recently, Akman anchors the TRT Haber program Akılda Kalan.

Akman has written three novels and published a collection of her interviews. Akman's brother is publisher Ali Ural of Şule Publications. She is the mother of one child.

== Works ==
- Nefes (novel)
- Örtü (novel)
- Kim (novel)
- İnci Avcısı
- Mebus Burcu
- Kalabalıklar
- Başka Sorum Yok
- Üzümünü Ye Bağını Sor
- Gurbette Fethullah Gülen
- Yüzleşme / Açlık Grevinde 205 Gün
- Mayın Tarlası / Sınırı Zorlayan Sorular
- Elli Kelime / Adnan Menderes'ten Berin Menderes'e Yassıada Mektupları
