= Varol Akman =

Turkish engineer (born 1957)

Varol Akman (born 8 June 1957, Antalya, Turkey) is Professor of Computer Engineering in Bilkent University, Ankara.

An academic of engineering background, Akman obtained his B.A in Electrical Engineering from the Middle East Technical University in Ankara. He then continued his graduate studies and obtained his Ph.D. from Rensselaer Polytechnic Institute under the tutelage of logician William Randolph Franklin.

Among his research interests are artificial intelligence, linguistics, social aspects of the Internet, Donald Davidson's philosophy and pragmatics. His articles have been published in journals such as Pragmatics and Cognition, Computational Intelligence, Minds and Machines, and Language and Communication.

He was influential in the founding of the Department of Philosophy in Bilkent University.
