= 28th Writers Guild of America Awards =

28th WGA Awards
- Date: 1976
- Organized by: Writers Guild of America, East and the Writers Guild of America, West

The 28th Writers Guild of America Awards honored the best film writers and television writers of 1975. Winners were announced in 1976.

== Winners and nominees ==
=== Film ===
Winners are listed first highlighted in boldface.

**Best Drama Written Directly for the Screen**: **Dog Day Afternoon, Written by Frank Pierson**; French Connection II, Written by Alexander Jacobs, Robert Dillon and Laurie Dillon; Nashville, Written by Joan Tewkesbury; The Wind and the Lion, Written by John Milius	**Best Comedy Written Directly for the Screen**: **Shampoo, Written by Robert Towne and Warren Beatty**; Hearts of the West, Written by Rob Thompson; Smile, Written by Jerry Belson; The Return of the Pink Panther, Written by Frank Waldman and Blake Edwards
**Best Drama Adapted from Another Medium**: **One Flew Over the Cuckoo's Nest, Screenplay by Lawrence Hauben and Bo Goldman; based on the novel by Ken Kesey**; Barry Lyndon, Screenplay by Stanley Kubrick; based on the novel by William Makepeace Thackeray; The Man Who Would Be King, Screenplay by John Huston and Gladys Hill; based on the story by Rudyard Kipling; Jaws, Screenplay by Peter Benchley and Carl Gottlieb; based on the novel by Peter Benchley; The Man in the Glass Booth, Screenplay by Edward Anhalt; based on the play by Robert Shaw	**Best Comedy Adapted from Another Medium**: **The Sunshine Boys, Screenplay by Neil Simon**; Hester Street, Screenplay by Joan Micklin Silver; based on the novel by Abraham Cahan; The Prisoner of Second Avenue, Screenplay by Neil Simon; based on the play by himself

=== Television ===
**Episodic Comedy**: **"Welcome to Korea" – M*A*S*H (CBS) – Everett Greenbaum, James Fritzell and Larry Gelbart**; "Archie the Hero" – All in the Family (CBS) – Lou Derman and Bill Davenport; "Big Mac" – M*A*S*H (CBS) – Laurence Marks; "Ida's Doctor" – Rhoda (CBS) – Coleman Mitchell and Geoffrey Neigher; "Edie Gets Married" – The Mary Tyler Moore Show (CBS) – Bob Ellison; "Chuckles Bites the Dust" – The Mary Tyler Moore Show (CBS) – David LLoyd	**Episodic Drama**: **"Prior Consent" – The Law (NBC) – Arthur A. Ross and Stephen Kandel**; "The Busters" – Gunsmoke (CBS) – Jim Byrnes; "The Goodluck Bomber" – Kojak (CBS) – Ray Brenner; "Web of Lies" – The Streets of San Francisco (ABC) – Leonard Kantor; "The Woman" – The Waltons (CBS) – Hindi Brooks
**Daytime Serials**: **Ryan's Hope (ABC) – Paul Avila Mayer, Claire Labine, Mary Munisteri and Allan Leicht**; Days of Our Lives (NBC) – Patricia Falken Smith, William J. Bell, Bill Rega, Margaret Stewart, Kay Lenard, and Sheri Anderson; The Edge of Night (CBS) – Henry Slesar	**Original Anthology**: **Queen of the Stardust Ballroom (CBS) – Jerome Kass**
**Original Variety**: **The Smothers Brothers Show (NBC) – Mason Williams, Rod Warren, Mickey Rose, Ray Jessel, Jim Mulligan, James R. Stein, Bob Illes, Chevy Chase, Pat Proft, Kenny Solms, and Gail Parent**

=== Special awards ===
Laurel Award for Screenwriting Achievement
**Michael Wilson**
Laurel Award for TV Writing Achievement
**Rod Serling**
Valentine Davies Award
**Winston Miller**
Morgan Cox Award
**William Ludwig**
