= Gum Tree, Kentucky =

Unincorporated community in Kentucky, United States

- Unincorporated community
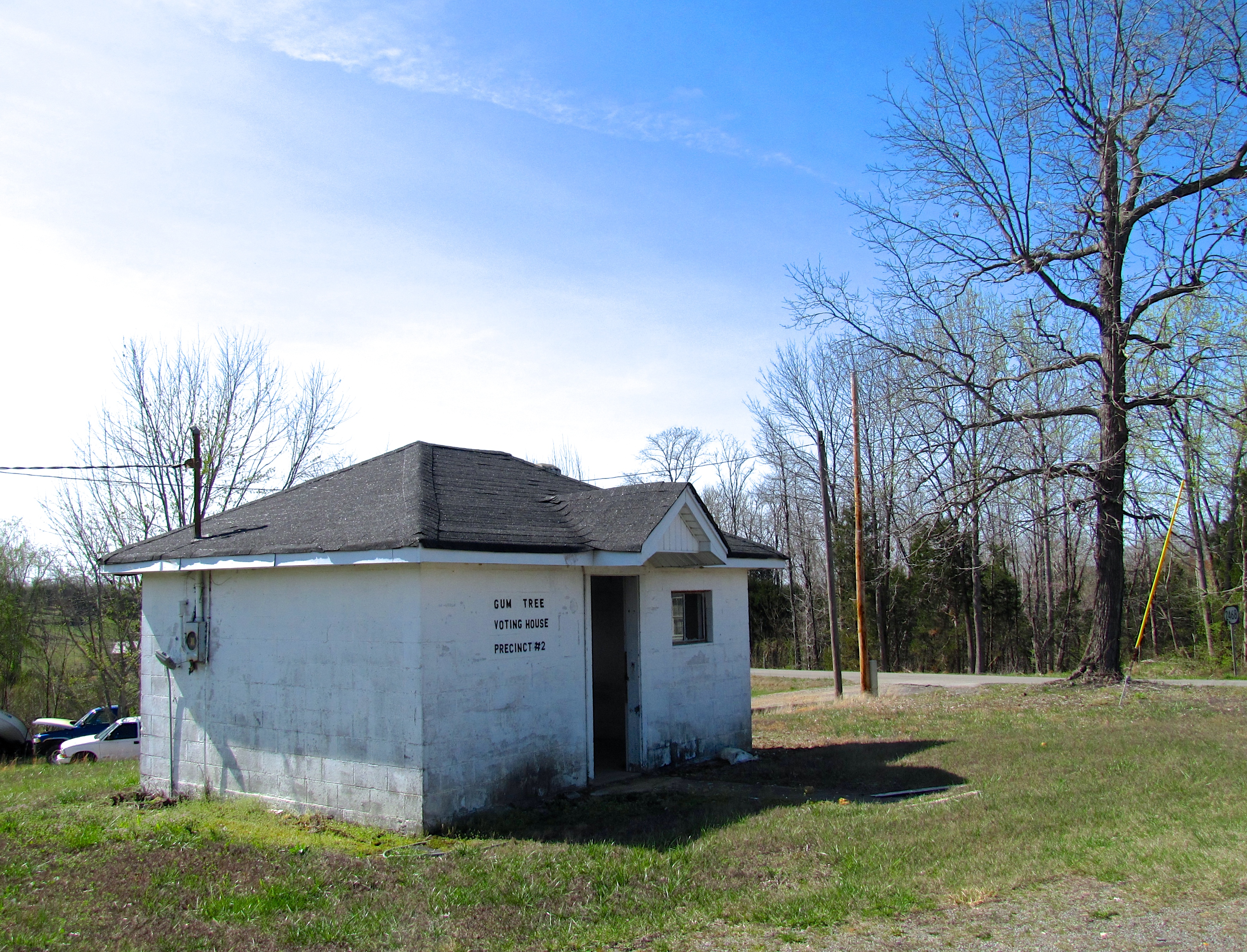
- Gum Tree Voting House

- Location within Kentucky Location within the United States
- Coordinates: 36°43′27″N 85°49′10″W
- Country: United States
- State: Kentucky
- County: Monroe
- Elevation: 938 ft (286 m)
- Time zone: UTC-6 (Central (CST))
  - Summer (DST): UTC-5 (CDT)
- ZIP codes: 42167
- GNIS feature ID: 508148

Gum Tree is an unincorporated community located in Monroe County, Kentucky, United States. It is concentrated around the intersection of Kentucky Route 678, Kentucky Route 870, and Kentucky Route 1366, northwest of Tompkinsville, north of Gamaliel, west of Mud Lick, Kentucky, and east of Flippin, Kentucky. Gum Tree is home to one of Monroe County's voting precincts, which had over 900 registered voters as of 2014.
