= Hester Street (film) =

1975 drama film directed by Joan Micklin Silver

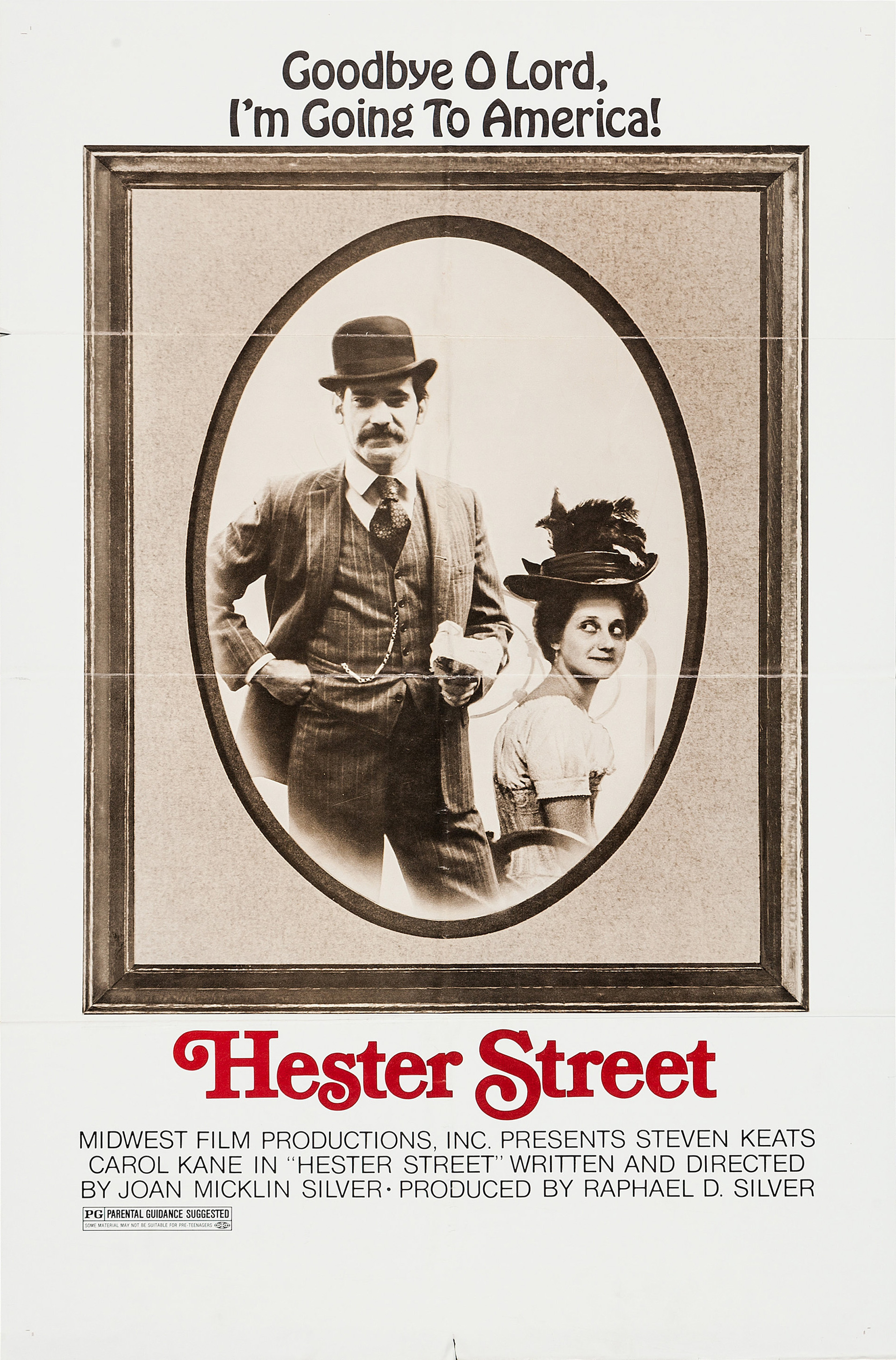
- Theatrical release poster
- Directed by: Joan Micklin Silver
- Screenplay by: Joan Micklin Silver
- Based on: Yekl: A Tale of the New York Ghetto by Abraham Cahan
- Produced by: Raphael D. Silver
- Starring: Steven Keats; Carol Kane; Doris Roberts
- Cinematography: Kenneth Van Sickle
- Edited by: Katherine Wenning
- Music by: Herbert L. Clarke; William Bolcom
- Production company: Midwest Films
- Distributed by: Midwest Films
- Release dates: March 19, 1975 (USA Film Festival); October 19, 1975 (United States)
- Running time: 90 minutes
- Country: United States
- Languages: English; Yiddish
- Budget: $365,000
- Box office: $4 million

Hester Street is a 1975 American comedy drama film based on Abraham Cahan's 1896 novella Yekl: A Tale of the New York Ghetto, and was adapted and directed by Joan Micklin Silver. The film stars Steven Keats and Carol Kane, who was nominated for an Academy Award for Best Actress for her performance.

In 2011, Hester Street was selected for preservation in the United States National Film Registry by the Library of Congress as being "culturally, historically, or aesthetically significant." In 2021, a 4K restoration of the film was released as part of the Cohen Film Collection. This restoration premiered at the 73rd Cannes Film Festival. The film was then screened at the 59th New York Film Festival and given limited theatrical releases in New York City and Los Angeles, drawing further attention to the film's legacy in the wake of Silver's death.

== Plot ==
Hester Street tells the story of Jewish immigrants who came from Eastern Europe to the Lower East Side of Manhattan in New York City in 1896, and live on Hester Street. When Yankel first comes to the U.S., he quickly assimilates into American culture, and becomes Jake. He also begins an affair with Mamie, a dancer. His wife, Gitl, who arrives later with their son, Yossele, has difficulty assimilating. Tension arises in their marriage as Jake continually upbraids and abuses Gitl. Additionally, Jake continues to see Mamie, which Gitl later discovers through Mrs. Kavarsky, a neighbor. Jake and Gitl ultimately divorce, whereby Gitl takes all of Mamie's money and marries Bernstein, a faithful traditionalist. By the end of the film, she is sartorially and lingually assimilated — walking down the street with Bernstein and Yossele (now known as Joey), speaking English, and showing her hair. But she is now liberated from Jake, who in turn has married Mamie.

== Cast ==
- Steven Keats as Jake
- Carol Kane as Gitl
- Mel Howard as Bernstein
- Dorrie Kavanaugh as Mamie
- Doris Roberts as Mrs. Kavarsky
- Lauren Friedman as Fanny
- Paul Freedman as Yossele/Joey

== Production ==
Prior to the development of Hester Street, Joan Micklin Silver had helmed a series of educational shorts and television films. As part of her research for one such project, a 1972 film called The Immigrant Experience: The Long Long Journey, Silver began reading the 1896 Abraham Cahan novella Yekl: A Tale of the New York Ghetto. Though a television producer told her not to center Jewish subjects in her film, feeling it would then be "too atypical", Silver maintained an interest in telling a story that reflected her own heritage. This was due in part to her family’s reluctance to discuss their own emigration experiences, as well as a desire to craft a project that would honor their legacy. She subsequently spent six weeks writing a screenplay adaptation of Cahan’s novella, shifting the book's focus from the husband's point of view to the wife's. She attempted to find investors for the film, but was told by one studio executive that "[features] are expensive to make […] and women directors are one more problem we don’t need". Eventually, she decided to finance the film independently with the help of her husband, real estate developer Raphael "Ray" Silver, who provided her with a budget of $370,000 through fundraising. Ray Silver also served as a producer and distributor for Hester Street under the Midwest Film Productions, Inc. banner.

Joan Micklin Silver had initially envisioned Carol Kane portraying Gitl after having seen Kane's performance in the 1972 Canadian film Wedding in White; however, she in turn assumed that Kane was Canadian, and as such would be difficult to book for a low-budget New York production. In actuality, Kane lived very close to where the film was being shot, and she was excited to audition for the film after having read the script. During the production of the film, Kane had to work with a dialect coach to learn Yiddish, a language she did not previously speak. Despite this additional effort on her part, Kane has maintained that she "loved every minute" of working on the film.

Production on Hester Street began in the summer of 1973. The film was primarily shot in New York City's Morton Street rather than the actual Hester Street, since by this time the street had numerous Hispanic shops with Spanish signage that would have been too expensive to remove. The film was shot in black-and-white, and principal photography wrapped in 34 days. Once the film had been shot, it was then edited over several months with the assistance of editor Ralph Rosenblum and filmmaker Elia Kazan.

== Release ==
After the film's completion, Ray and Joan Micklin Silver struggled to find distribution for Hester Street. The couple independently attempted to pitch the film to various distributors three separate times in 1975, but were routinely rejected on the grounds that the film was too "ethnic" and would only appeal to older Jewish audiences. Hester Street premiered at the USA Film Festival on March 19, 1975, before screening as a part of International Critics' Week at the 28th Cannes Film Festival on May 11, 1975. Despite the film's festival success, the Silvers were still unable to find reliable distribution deals. Eventually, Ray Silver reached out to fellow independent filmmaker John Cassavetes, who had just finished work on his 1974 film A Woman Under the Influence, for advice. Cassavetes then connected the Silvers with booker Blaine Novak, whom they hired to distribute the film.

Hester Street then opened in New York on October 19, 1975, and later in Los Angeles on November 26 of that year. After that, the film was acquired by the General Cinema Corporation and went on to gross $1.45 million by February 1976. Despite initial concern from distributors over the film's supposedly niche focus, Ray Silver noted that the film found success in areas with small Jewish populations. Carol Kane's Academy Award nomination for the film helped generate interest; Max Burkett, who had previously bolstered Julie Christie to an Oscar win for her performance in the 1965 film Darling, had been hired by the Silvers to helm Kane's campaign. The film went on to gross $5 million by the end of its theatrical run. Joan Micklin Silver would use the profits from Hester Street in part to fund her next project, the 1977 comedy film Between the Lines.

Hester Street was first released on Blu-ray by Scorpion Releasing and Kino Lorber on March 17, 2015. In 2021, Hester Street was given a 4K re-release by the Cohen Film Collection, completing the restoration work that Joan Micklin Silver had yet to finish prior to her death earlier that year. Her daughter, fellow filmmaker Marisa Silver, served as a consultant on the project. Tim Lanza, a film archivist and vice president of the Cohen Film Collection, called Hester Street the "jewel" of Joan Micklin Silver's filmography. The restoration premiered at the 73rd Cannes Film Festival. This version of the film was also screened at the 59th New York Film Festival, and received limited theatrical releases in New York and Los Angeles to commemorate Joan Micklin Silver's legacy. Kino Lorber released the restored version of the film on Blu-ray on March 8, 2022.

== Reception ==
=== Critical reception ===
==== Contemporary ====
Initial reviews of Hester Street were mixed. Variety published a complimentary review, stating that Hester Street "deftly delves into Jewish emigration" and that Silver "displays a sure hand for her first pic". Writing for The New York Times in October 1975, critic Richard Eder praised the film, noting that, though he felt its subject matter wasn't particularly groundbreaking, the performances from its cast elevated it to "loveliness". Eder especially highlighted Kane's portrayal of Gitl, writing, "Big-eyed, scared and inaudible at first, a spark of allure pops out here, a spark of anger there, until by the end of the picture she is a triumphant bonfire. Miss Kane manages the high acting feat of seeming to change size physically, expanding and shrinking as she is happy or miserable." However, despite Eder's enthusiasm, in November of that year, The New York Times also published a more negative review by Walter Goodman, who described Silver's direction as "neither light nor sure". Pauline Kael of The New Yorker was similarly unimpressed; though she noted that the film's "narrative simplicity" was "defenselessly appealing", she criticized Silver's characterization, writing that "[t]he aggressive characters don't have enough sensitivity—or juice—to come to life".

==== Retrospective ====
Many critical reappraisals of Hester Street were published upon the release of the Cohen Film Collection restoration in 2021. Despite the film's initially lukewarm reception, the bulk of these retrospective reviews were overwhelmingly positive. Writing for Hyperallergic, Charles Bramesco praised the film, stating, "The richness of Silver’s filmmaking lies in her attention to detail and texture, as she recreates a world that had largely vanished by the time she made New York her home. [...] She fills her frugally constructed slice of the past with snatches of quotidian life, her camera passing over people playing cards, buying fish, and talking about their plans for the Sabbath. Committing this to film ensured that these memories will not be forgotten or erased — Silver’s highest mitzvah of all."

Like many initial reviews of the film, several retrospective takes on Hester Street praised Carol Kane's performance. In a New York Film Festival review for The Playlist, critic Mark Asch described her performance by saying, "She’s a marvel here, a figure genuinely out of the past, looking in her wigs and headscarves both like a little girl and like someone who was never young. She moves with a tentativeness that conveys the future shock of this moment in history while her eyes take in the world in marvelment and implore her husband for acknowledgment and connection. Your heart breaks—and so does Jake’s, even as he’s embarrassed by her." Similarly, Annie Berke of The Forward noted, "Kane’s performance here is quietly expressive, revealing steeliness beneath her soft, girlish features. (It’s astounding that she was able to achieve this acting mostly in Yiddish, a language she didn’t speak.)"

On the review aggregator website Rotten Tomatoes, 81% of 31 critics' reviews are positive.

=== Awards and nominations ===
Award	Category	Recipient	Result
Academy Awards	Best Actress	Carol Kane	Nominated
International Filmfestival Mannheim-Heidelberg	Interfilm Award	Joan Micklin Silver	Won
National Film Preservation Board	National Film Registry		Inducted
Valladolid International Film Festival	Golden Spike (Best Film)	Joan Micklin Silver	Nominated
Writers Guild of America Awards	Best Comedy Adapted from Another Medium	Joan Micklin Silver	Nominated

== Legacy ==
In 2011, Hester Street was deemed "culturally, historically, or aesthetically significant" by the United States Library of Congress, and selected for preservation in the National Film Registry. In making its selection, the Registry state that the film was "a portrait of Eastern European Jewish life in America that historians have praised for its accuracy of detail and sensitivity to the challenges immigrants faced during their acculturation process".

In the wake of the film's restoration, Hester Street has been noted for its unique status as both an independent film directed by a woman and an immigrant tale, two categories of film that were rare at the time of the film's release. Writing for Hey Alma, Mia J. Merrill noted the film's surprisingly nuanced take on assimilation in immigrant communities:

'Hester Street' presents assimilation as an inevitable reality, the good and the bad — the nice new clothes reserved for upper classes back in Poland that anyone can wear in New York; the open space of the Lower East Side streets; the realization that the cloistered, segregated New York of the turn of the century can isolate Jews as much as any shtetl; the way that English first feels foreign in Gitl’s mouth before it slowly overtakes her, replacing words and phrases in Yiddish until she can express herself fully in either language. But it’s a violent assimilation as well, one filled with cries as Jake pushes past Gitl with scissors to cut off their son’s peyos (sidelocks), insisting that he not be called Yossele anymore, but Joey. The film presents a world just out of reach to 1975 audiences, when some may have been able to recall the golden age of Yiddish theatre and cinema, by then almost entirely gone. 'Hester Street' feels almost like a musical at times, the ensemble moving in tableau on the streets and Yiddish lilting like a song.

Merrill also observed that, while the film places an obvious focus on the Jewish experience, its sense of specificity and detail could allow it to resonate with immigrants from a wide range of backgrounds; in the same piece, Tim Lanza of the Cohen Film Collection mentioned that his Sicilian grandmother would have likely put salt in her pockets as protection from the evil eye, as Gitl does for Joey in the film.

In The Forward, Annie Berke discussed the rarity of the feminist vision of solidarity presented in Hester Street. She writes, "In the last scene of the film, Gitl (with Bernstein) and Mamie (with Jake) walk the streets of the Lower East Side. They tread the same bumpy cobblestone path of the film’s title, one named after Queen Esther, who, in securing the love of a king, ensured the continuity of the Jewish people. The wife and the vamp — the Esther and the Vashti — have long been pitted against each other, historically and narratively. But might not these two women understand one another better even than their spouses do?"

For the same publication, Rukhl Schaechter praised Joan Micklin Silver for being unafraid to tell a grounded story centered around kind, generous Jewish women, when many on-screen portrayals of Jewish-American life at the time depicted Jewish femininity as a subject of ridicule. Schaechter explains, "The dignity with which Silver imbued Gitl was a revelation. Women like me, with names like Rukhl or Freydl or Penina, with curly, frizzy hair, didn’t need to change our names or get our hair straightened." She also remarked on the film's groundbreaking usage of Yiddish, which had previously only been used sporadically in popular culture as comedic relief, such as in the 1974 Mel Brooks comedy Blazing Saddles.

Hester Street remains Carol Kane's favorite project of all her work in film and television. She has theorized that her delivery of Yiddish dialogue in the film helped her obtain what is now one of her most recognizable roles, Simka Dahblitz-Gravas, in the sitcom Taxi, since her character partially speaks a fictional language with a vaguely Eastern European accent.

In December 2021, Hester Street was ranked 94th in a Vulture list of the 101 greatest films set in New York City. For the article, Bilge Ebiri wrote of the film, "Silver’s direction combines a melodramatic, silent-movie sensibility with an indie-film austerity that makes it hard to pinpoint the period to which the picture belongs. As a result, it’s almost literally timeless."

== Stage adaptation ==
On May 25, 2016, Variety reported that producers Michael Rabinowitz and Ira Deutchman had optioned the rights to produce a stage adaptation of Hester Street, which would be developed as a "straight play that incorporates live musical performances". The New York Times additionally reported that playwright Sharyn Rothstein would write the adaptation. The show premiered on March 27, 2024, at Theater J in Washington, D.C. The production is directed by Oliver Butler.
