= Lamb, Kentucky =

Unincorporated community in Kentucky, United States

- Unincorporated community
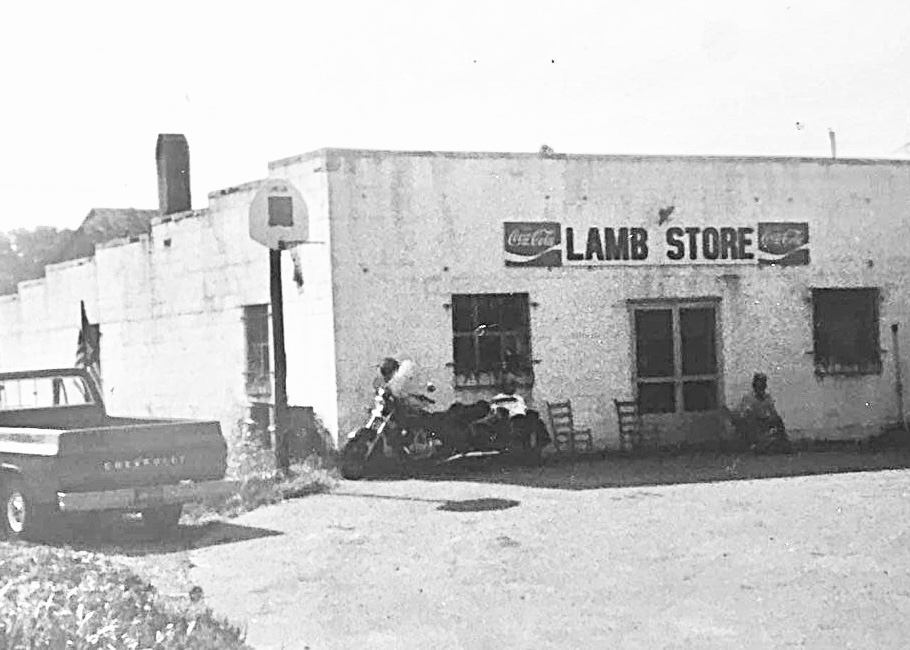

- Location within Kentucky Location within the United States
- Coordinates: 36°45′31″N 85°53′57″W
- Country: United States
- State: Kentucky
- County: Monroe
- Elevation: 919 ft (280 m)
- Time zone: UTC-6 (Central (CST))
  - Summer (DST): UTC-5 (CDT)
- ZIP codes: 42167, 42133
- GNIS feature ID: 508421

Lamb is an unincorporated community located 1/2 mi. south of the Monroe-Barren County boundary line on Kentucky Route 249, and centered at its intersection with New Design Road and Jack Hunt Road, in Monroe County, Kentucky, United States.

== History ==
According to U. S. postal records in the National Archives, a post office for this community was first established, November 18, 1892, with Joseph F. Turner as postmaster but discontinued the following year, September 15, 1893. Dry goods merchant Cornelius W. Jones was the first postmaster of a second post office established, January 22, 1900, which was discontinued in 1915. A third post office was established here, November 19, 1925, in Lamb general store #1 with Robert Fred Johns[t]on as storekeeper and postmaster. Lamb general store #1 and post office was a wooden frame building that faced New Design Road, located behind the site of store #2. Store #1 was replaced by Lamb general store #2 and post office, a concrete block building (see photo) that faced Kentucky Route 249, built by Erskine Johnson about 1958.

Subsequent postmasters, Della Johnson, Erskine Johnson, Pearl Johnson, and Oleta Wheeler served Lamb post office (42155) consecutively until June 1, 1989. Thereafter, Janet Bewley served as officer-in-charge of a postal station at Lamb until service was suspended, November 30, 1990, and finally discontinued December 12, 1994. Lamb general store #2 was also closed about the same time, and the building later burned. The concrete floor pad of store #2 is all that remains today.

According to Charlie D. Wheeler, Lamb storekeeper and husband of Lamb's last postmaster, Oleta Ruth (Johnson) Wheeler, the origin/source of the "Lamb" name was Oleta's grandfather, John Newton Johnson (1852–1922), who had sheep on his farm. John Newton Johnson was the father of Lamb postmasters, Della Mae Johnson and David Erskine Johnson, and father-in-law of Annie Pearl (Arterburn) Johnson. Joel Flowers (1797–1862), maternal grandfather of John Newton Johnson, was the first identifiable recorded landowner here.

== Notable people ==
- Cynthia May Carver (March 14, 1903 – April 11, 1980), known professionally as Cousin Emmy, was born here.
