= Cousin Emmy =

Pioneering female country music performer

- Born: Cynthia May Carver; March 14, 1903
- Origin: Lamb, Kentucky, U.S.
- Died: April 11, 1980 (aged 77) Sherman Oaks, California, U.S.
- Genres: Old-time music
- Occupation: Musician
- Instruments: banjo, fiddle
- Years active: 1930s–1960s
- Labels: Decca; Folkways
- Formerly of: Cousin Emmy and Her Kinfolk

Cynthia May Carver (March 14, 1903 – April 11, 1980), known professionally as Cousin Emmy, was a banjo player, fiddler and country singer who was one of the pioneering solo female stars in the country music industry. Although hit records eluded her, she proved to be a major name in personal appearances and on radio in the 1940s and 50s. In the 1960s she gained a new audience on the folk music circuit. Her song "Ruby, Are You Mad at Your Man?" became a bluegrass standard after it was covered by the Osborne Brothers. She started out her career by playing with Frankie Moore's Log Cabin Boys. She influenced the playing of Grandpa Jones. She appeared in two films, Swing in the Saddle and The Second Greatest Sex.

== Early years ==
Cousin Emmy was born into a family of sharecroppers at Lamb, Monroe County, Kentucky, where her parents were listed as “renters” in Gum District of the 1900 U.S. Census. By 1910, the family of six older siblings and one younger sibling had moved across the county line where they were listed nearby in the Tracy District in the U.S. Census of Barren County, Kentucky.

== Career ==
Cousin Emmy began performing as a small child. Playing five-string banjo, she performed with two Carver cousins in a band broadcast on WHB in Kansas City, Missouri. After developing a following in her native Barren County, Kentucky, she eventually attracted the attention of radio station WHAS in Louisville, where she became a featured act with Frankie Moore's Log Cabin Boys in 1935. Between her radio performances, she performed in live shows, often traveling as much as 500 miles in one day.

In 1935, she won the National Oldtime Fiddlers' Contest – the first woman to do so. By 1938, she had her own touring group and a radio program.

As her radio shows gained popularity, she moved on to larger markets at WNOX in Knoxville, Tennessee, at KMOX in St. Louis (beginning in 1941) and Chicago. Her KMOX broadcast attracted more than 2.5 million listeners "from Canada to Mexico." This popularity led to a recording contract at Decca Records. Although she recorded only one album for the label, this recording and her performances with Cousin Emmy and Her Kinfolk helped her develop a devoted fanbase.

In 1945, Cousin Emmy ... Song Book was published. It included photographs, a biographical sketch, and lyrics of nine songs.

Later, Cousin Emmy relocated to Los Angeles, where she appeared in the film, Swing in the Saddle. She also appeared at local country music clubs while raising several adopted children.

After the Osborne Brothers heard Cousin Emmy and Her Kinfolk's recording of "Ruby Are You Mad?" on a jukebox, they recorded the song for MGM Records in 1956, and it remains one of their best known recordings. The song is perhaps best known today for its top five remake by Buck Owens in 1971. She also had an album, "Kentucky Mountain Ballads" in 1947 on the Decca label.

Cousin Emmy gained a new audience as a result of the folk revival of the 1960s. In 1961, while performing at a "Country & Western Night" show at Disneyland, she met the New Lost City Ramblers, one of several groups that had formed during that time. She appeared on Rainbow Quest, a folk music series hosted by Pete Seeger. In 1967, the New Lost City Ramblers convinced Cousin Emmy to record with them on the album "The New Lost City Ramblers with Cousin Emmy". This led to an appearance at the Newport Folk Festival, excerpts of which were released on Vanguard, as part of an anthology collection and in Festival, an Academy Award-nominated documentary.

An astute businesswoman, she retained the copyrights to her songs.

== Influence ==
Her song "Chilly Scenes of Winter" from the album The New Lost City Ramblers with Cousin Emmy is mentioned in Ann Beattie's 1976 novel of the same name, when the novel's protagonist Charles listens to it. The song's theme of fickle love provided the title.

== Death ==
Carver died in Sherman Oaks, California on April 11, 1980.
