= Yekl: A Tale of the New York Ghetto =

1896 book by Abraham Cahan

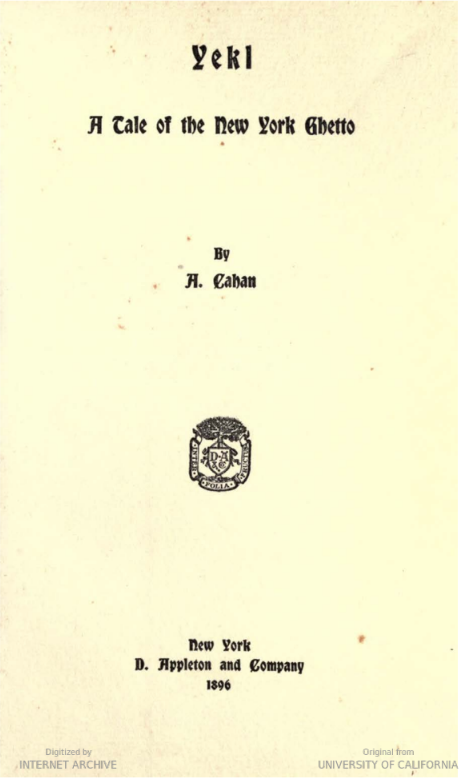
- First edition title page
- Author: Abraham Cahan
- Language: English
- Genre: Realism
- Set in: New York City, 1890s
- Published: 1896
- Publisher: D. Appleton & Company
- Publication date: 1896
- Publication place: United States
- Pages: 190
- ISBN: 1523898216

Yekl: A Tale of the New York Ghetto is Abraham Cahan's first book, published in 1896. It depicts the life of Jewish immigrants living in a New York City ghetto. The plot follows Yekl, Russian-Jewish immigrant sweatshop worker, as he attempts to assimilate into American culture. His attempts are complicated by the arrival of his wife and son, which force him to decide between his Jewish identity and a new American one.

The novella blends realism and regionalism to depict what life was like for newly arrived immigrants in the United States. Realism author William Dean Howells played a large part in getting the story published, as he discovered and encouraged Cahan to write a more serious story about life in the Jewish ghetto. While Yekl: A Tale of the New York Ghetto did not sell well, it would later serve as the basis for Joan Micklin Silver’s 1975 film Hester Street.

== Background ==
Yekl would likely not have existed were it not for the influence of realism author William Dean Howells, who played a major "role in its inception, publication, and reception." Howells and Abraham Cahan first met in 1892, while Howells was doing research for A Traveler from Altruria. The two would meet again in 1895 after Howells' wife gave him a copy of Cahan's short story "A Providential Match." While Howells was not particularly taken by this story, he encouraged Cahan "to work up a more substantial piece on ghetto life." This prompted Cahan to immediately begin on the manuscript for Yekl.

Upon its completion, Cahan sent the manuscript to Howells, who praised the work saying "an important force had been added to American literature." Howells' only suggestion was to change the title from Yankele the Yankee to Yekl: A Tale of the New York Ghetto.

== Plot summary ==
The story starts with Jake, three years after he first stepped foot in America. In that time, he has embraced American culture as much as possible, so much so that he no longer goes by his given name, Yekl. When he’s not working in the sweatshop, he spends much of his time at Joe Peltner’s dance hall, where he becomes close with Mamie and Fanny.

One day, he receives a letter from home informing him of his father’s death. While he has enjoyed his time pretending to be a bachelor, the news prompts him to make good on his promise to buy a ticket for his wife (Gitl) and son (Yossele) to join him in New York.

Upon their arrival, Jake is embarrassed by his wife’s appearance and ignorance of the English language. He tries to correct this behavior and even gets Mrs. Kavarsky (his neighbor) to help turn Gitl into a more American woman. Gitl tries, but struggles to throw away her traditional beliefs and customs.

Mamie, one of Jake's dance partners, then pays a visit to Jake and he starts to fall for her. Mamie, unlike Gitl, has changed herself to become a proper American woman, at least in the context of the Jewish ghetto they inhabit. Jake pays her a visit, which Fanny (one of Jake's dance partners and coworkers) witnesses and reports back to Gitl.

Gitl runs to Mrs. Kavarsky with the news and Mrs. Kavarsky removes Gitl’s handkerchief from her head and cuts her hair in order to make her more appealing to Jake. However, this is not enough for Jake, so he leaves and runs to Mamie. Finding her, he declares his love and they conceive a plan to get him and Gitl a divorce, so the two can get married.

The divorce gets finalized, allowing Gitl to marry Mr. Bernstein (their neighbor and Jake's coworker) and Jake to marry Mamie. Jake then leaves with Mamie and they head to the mayor's office to get married. On their way, Jake begins to feel that he has made a mistake and wishes that he didn’t have to get married again.

== Characters ==
- Yekl (Jake) Podkovnik – a Jewish immigrant from Russia who works in a sweatshop. He loves to dance and embraces American culture, choosing to go by Jake and using English phrases as much as he can. He struggles when faced with his past life in Russia, which he ultimately abandons in favor of living an American lifestyle.
- Gitl Podkovnik – Yekl’s wife, who moves to New York City three years after Yekl arrives. She has a major culture shock on arrival, but is reluctant to change.
- Yossele Podkovinik – Yekl and Gitl’s young son.
- Mamie – A Polish immigrant, who is one of Yekl’s dance partners that he eventually falls for because she represents the ideal, assimilated woman.
- Fanny – Yekl’s coworker, who likes Yekl until she finds out he’s married and tells Gitl about Yekl’s inappropriate behavior with Mamie.
- Mrs. Kavarsky – an older lady, who tries to help Gitl become more American so that Yekl will love her again.
- Mr. Bernstein – a well read coworker of Yekl’s, who marries Gitl when Yekl leaves her for Mamie.
- Joe Peltner – owner of the dance hall Yekl spends much of his time at.

== Themes ==
=== Immigration and assimilation ===
This story is ultimately about immigrants, immigration, and assimilation. The narrative takes place in the New York ghetto and there is not a single "American" character present. Jake's (Yekl's) desire for assimilation is clear from the beginning of the novella. He has Americanized his name to Jake, he talks about American sports, and seems overall uninterested in practicing his Jewish faith. While he tries to push his old Russian life behind him, the arrival of his wife and son prevents that. Gitl, unlike Jake, is unwilling to throw away her Old World morals and behavior for the sake of being an American. These two characters take different paths at the end: Gitl happy with a man who respects the Old World as she does, and Jake dreading the future he chose.

=== Language ===
All of the dialogue in Yekl is a mix of English translated Yiddish and English spoken with a Yiddish accent. By exposing readers to Yiddish, Cahan more concretely roots the story in the Jewish ghetto its set it. In many ways, the inclusion of this type of language helps preserve the culture existing at the time, which is what characterizes Yekl as an example of regionalism.

Within the narrative, language plays a critical role. Jake (Yekl) uses it to show how much he has embraced American culture, by using English words as much as possible. He also uses his knowledge of the English language to both impress and ridicule Gitl for his knowledge and her ignorance. Mamie is another character who knows English quite well, which is a sign of her Americanization. Additionally, Mamie uses English to alienate Gitl during their first meeting. In many ways, knowledge of English operates as a symbol of power in this story.

=== Masculinity ===
Throughout the novella Jake (Yekl) repeats the phrase "Dot'sh a' kin' a man I am!," however, it's never clear what kind of man he actually is. Jake presents himself as a bachelor before his wife and son's arrival to New York and then can't seem to decide if he has enough love to stay with them or not. In the end, he decides to leave them for the Americanized Mamie and finds himself dreading that decision. Given the contrast between Jake's declaration and his actions, Cahan seems to imply that Jake's presentation of masculinity is far different from his understanding of it.

=== Education ===
The issue of education is raised early on in the novella. Jake (Yekl) is an uneducated man, whose English is derived from his desire to become an American. Mr. Bernstein, on the other hand, spends his time reading newspapers with an English dictionary in order to get a proper understanding of the language. Literary critic Lori Jirousek-Falls describes Yekl's education style as "incidental" and Mr. Bernstein's as "intentional." As a result, the two characters embark on different trajectories as the story develops. In the end, Mr. Bernstein and Gitl end up happily married, while Jake hopes that the ride to the court house will last indefinitely so he can remain a bachelor forever. Jirousek-Falls concludes that "Berstein represents the immigrant who prizes scholarship highly and discovers ways to incorporate Old World traditions with New World success," whereas Jake casts his Old World traditions aside, in favor of embracing American culture in an impulsive, unproductive way. Both characters have authority over their choices, but it's clear that Cahan suggests that "intentional" education is more rewarding path.

== Publication and critical reception ==
After completing the manuscript, Abraham Cahan and William Dean Howells worked to find a publisher, which would be a difficult task. Much of this was to do with the literary market of the time that had not fully embraced realism and poorly concealed anti-Semitism present in the publishing industry. As a result, Cahan and Howells were rejected by a number of publishers including Harper's Weekly and McClure's. Frustrated, Cahan decided to translate Yekl into Yiddish and published it in his own paper under the original title, Yankele the Yankee. Howells was initially upset learning about this, but considered that the book was not published because it wasn't in English. Eventually, Howells would get the novella published with D. Appleton and Company, where it would be published in 1896.

Despite finding a publisher and the glowing review Howells gave the novella, Yekl was not a commercial success. Literary realism was still growing as a genre and contemporary readers seemed to want "their fiction to include beautiful people, attractive objects, and happy endings." As a result, some critics today feel that Yekl is a "neglected masterpiece", much like Kate Chopin's The Awakening, because of its examination of how dominant cultures impact minority groups; a problem that is still present in the United States.
