= Indian Creek (Barren River tributary) =

Stream in Monroe County, Kentucky, United States

Coordinates: 36°41′29″N 85°57′51″W

Indian Creek is a stream in Monroe County, Kentucky, United States, and a tributary of the Barren River, or “Big Barren River” as described in early deeds and surveys, which distinguished it from the “Little Barren River,” another stream in Southcentral Kentucky.

The named tributaries of Indian Creek—the “waters of Indian Creek,” historically—are Bethel Branch, Pikesville Branch, Slickrock/Grooms Branch, and Millstone Branch.

The "forks of Indian Creek" describes the juncture of the main stream of Indian Creek and the South Fork of Indian Creek, which converge in the village of Flippin, Kentucky.

The origin of the name, “Indian Creek,” has not been directly documented, but is believed to have derived from Native American/Indigenous campsites in the area.
