= Chilly Scenes of Winter (film) =

1979 film by Joan Micklin Silver

- Theatrical release poster under its original title prior to re-release
- Directed by: Joan Micklin Silver
- Screenplay by: Joan Micklin Silver
- Based on: Chilly Scenes of Winter by Ann Beattie
- Produced by: Mark Metcalf; Amy Robinson; Griffin Dunne
- Starring: John Heard; Mary Beth Hurt; Peter Riegert; Kenneth McMillan; Gloria Grahame
- Cinematography: Bobby Byrne
- Edited by: Cynthia Scheider
- Music by: Ken Lauber
- Production company: Triple Play Productions
- Distributed by: United Artists
- Release date: October 19, 1979
- Running time: 92 minutes
- Country: United States
- Language: English
- Budget: $2.2 million

Chilly Scenes of Winter is a 1979 American romantic comedy-drama film written and directed by Joan Micklin Silver, and starring John Heard, Mary Beth Hurt, Peter Riegert, Kenneth McMillan, and Gloria Grahame. Based on the 1976 novel by Ann Beattie, it follows a civil servant worker in Salt Lake City who falls in love with a recently separated woman who works in his office building.

Filmed on location in Salt Lake City, it was released by United Artists in October 1979 under the alternate title Head Over Heels, and promoted as a lighthearted romantic comedy, much to the disapproval of director Silver as well as the film's actors. The cast and crew unsuccessfully petitioned for United Artists to release the film under its original title. Following an unfavorable box-office performance, United Artists re-released the film in 1982 as Chilly Scenes of Winter, featuring an alternate cut which concludes with a downbeat ending, unlike the original version and its source novel.

== Plot ==
Charles Richardson is a civil servant in his early thirties, working in the Department of Development in Salt Lake City, Utah. A depressed and impetuous romantic, Charles drinks on the job, lamenting his former lover, Laura, an administrative assistant in the office's filing department. Though their brief affair ended over a year earlier, Charles remains obsessed with Laura, who has reunited with her husband Jim, a log-home salesman. Charles insists to his younger sister, Susan, and best friend, Sam, that he intends to win Laura back.

In nonlinear flashbacks, Charles reflects on his affair with Laura, and its swift disintegration, marked by jealousy and possessiveness: After he asked to marry her, Laura distanced herself from Charles. Following their breakup, the two briefly met in the parking lot of Laura's stepdaughter's school, but their meeting devolved into an argument in which Laura proclaimed to Charles that he has an "exalted" view of her that is not grounded in reality.

Consumed by his obsession with Laura, Charles frequently parks outside her and Jim's A-frame house, and at home constructs a miniature replica of it, complete with figurines and furniture. Sam, who is unemployed and staying with Charles, grows worried over his obsessive behavior. Meanwhile, Charles attempts to cope with his eccentric mother, Clara, who is consumed by suicidal ideations, as well as his incredulous stepfather, Pete.

Charles learns that his co-worker, Betty, has remained friends with Laura since Laura quit her job at the office. He casually attempts to court Betty, though his efforts prove unsuccessful as his feelings for her are not genuine. Charles visits Jim's custom home building company with Sam, the men posing as a gay couple under the guise of wanting to purchase one of Jim's houses. Jim allows Charles and Sam to view his home, shocking Laura, who returns during their tour. Jim explains to a visibly rattled Laura that Charles and Sam are lovers and potential clients. While Jim converses with Sam, Charles approaches Laura in the kitchen and hugs her. The four have drinks together in the living room, during which Charles startles Jim by proclaiming that he is in love with Laura, leading Jim to force the two men out of the house.

Weeks later, Charles is remorseful for his outburst, and decides to have dinner with Betty to distract himself. Charles is enlivened when he learns from Betty that Laura has again left Jim and moved into an apartment on her own. After retrieving Laura's phone number, Charles arrives at her apartment with a bouquet of tulips. Laura is ambivalent about his arrival, and wary of resuming a relationship with him given their past and the current tumult of her life. The two argue, and Charles eventually bids her farewell.

That night, Charles returns to his home and throws the A-frame replica dollhouse in the garbage, declaring that he is finally done pursuing Laura. Weeks pass as winter transitions into spring.

=== Ending ===
In the original release, the film ends as such: One day after returning home from work after doing a jog, Charles finds Laura there, cooking a dessert soufflé in the kitchen.

In the 1982 release: Charlie finally realizes that the relationship is never going to work out. He goes to Laura to tell her as much and walks away from her, telling himself, "It's over. Yeah, it's over." The film ends with him stating in voiceover while leaving work that "It's not that it doesn't still hurt. It's that you get used to it", before it closes with him doing a light jog and resting after finishing.

== Cast ==
- John Heard as Charles Richardson
- Mary Beth Hurt as Laura Connelly
- Peter Riegert as Sam
- Kenneth McMillan as Pete
- Gloria Grahame as Clara
- Nora Heflin as Betty
- Jerry Hardin as Mr. Patterson
- Tarah Nutter as Susan Richardson
- Mark Metcalf as Jim Connelly
- Griffin Dunne as Dr. Mark

== Production ==
=== Development ===
Mark Metcalf, Amy Robinson, and Griffin Dunne, all actors and novice film producers, purchased the rights to Ann Beattie's novel Chilly Scenes of Winter, hoping to produce a feature film adaptation. Director Joan Micklin Silver, who was also a fan of the novel, read a news piece regarding their acquisition of the film rights, and Silver, who was an acquaintance of Metcalf, contacted him and asked to write and direct the feature, to which the producers agreed.

The film's distributor, United Artists, rejected the title Chilly Scenes of Winter, and a joke title that Metcalf and the other producers suggested thinking it would be rejected—Head Over Heels—was accepted after 20th Century Fox would not surrender the rights of another proposed title, Laura, because it was the title of one of their classic films.

=== Casting ===
Producer Metcalf says that United Artists, who financed the picture, offered to double the film's $2.5 million budget to $5 million if John Heard was replaced by one of three actors (John Ritter, Robin Williams or Treat Williams). Metcalf and his fellow producers Griffin Dunne and Amy Robinson had always intended Heard to play the lead, and turned down the offer. Silver, who had previously directed Heard in Between the Lines (1977), also championed his casting in the lead role.

Metcalf has stated that Meryl Streep originally agreed to play the role of Laura, but only if Sam Waterston was cast as Charles. The producers, who did not have a casting director and cast the picture themselves along with director Silver, cast Mary Beth Hurt instead since Streep would not act opposite Heard. In addition to Hurt and Streep, Anne Archer and Jamie Lee Curtis also auditioned for the role of Laura.

Ann Beattie, who "loved" Silver's script, gave the producers an option for her book with the proviso that they give her a bit part in the film. She was paid $26 for appearing as a waitress in a diner scene, not given dialogue as she would have had to be paid $225 for a speaking part.

=== Filming ===
Principal photography began in Salt Lake City on February 22, 1979. According to director Silver, the producers initially planned to film in Albany, New York, but the local films unions' demands were economically prohibitive. By March 1979, the production had moved to sound stages in Culver City, California. According to producer Robinson, the bulk of the interior sequences were filmed in Los Angeles.

== Release ==
=== Original theatrical run ===
The original version of the film was titled Head Over Heels at the insistence of United Artists, who financed and distributed the film, and felt this was a more commercially viable title. The name change was protested by the film's crew members, who signed a petition protesting it. This original cut of the film features a happy ending in which Laura is reunited with Charles, as in the source novel. The film premiered in New York City on October 19, 1979, and opened in Los Angeles the following week. During its original two-week run in New York City, the film earned $17,000.

=== 1982 re-release ===
In 1982, United Artists launched its United Artists Classics division that re-released the film under the title of its source novel, Chilly Scenes of Winter. This version omitted the uplifting ending featuring Charles and Laura's reconciliation, instead resolving with a more ambiguous conclusion that does not result in the couple remaining united. The film had a more successful theatrical run during its re-release, earning approximately $20,000 during a single week.

=== Critical response ===
Reviewing the original cut of the film, Vincent Canby of The New York Times described it as "seeming to be on the verge of some revelation of profound feeling that, at long last, never comes." However, he gave high praise to the acting, writing "there's not a false performance in the film." Leonard Maltin referred to the film as divisive: "it will either charm or annoy" the viewer. He awards it two-and-a-half stars. Charles Champlin of the Los Angeles Times described it as “an intelligent and attractively acted, wry study of a human relationship."

Reviewing the film during its 1982 release, Michael D. Reid of the Times Colonist praised the film as "a splendidly refreshing romantic comedy—a true tale of love's firm grip on the psyche."

On the review aggregator website Rotten Tomatoes, 90% of 10 critics' reviews are positive, with an average rating of 6.6/10.

=== Home media ===
Twilight Time release a limited edition Blu-ray of Chilly Scenes of Winter in 2017. The Criterion Collection released a new Blu-ray edition on March 28, 2023 with a newly restored 4K digital transfer.

== Influence ==
Writing for DVD Talk, Justin Remer noted: "Chilly Scenes of Winter might be the best American movie about a romantic break-up. The film is not well-known now, but it wouldn't be hard to imagine someone on the creative team of High Fidelity half-remembering this smart little flick and taking just a little inspiration from it."
