= The Rise of David Levinsky =

1917 novel by Abraham Cahan

The Rise of David Levinsky is a novel by Abraham Cahan. It was published in 1917, and remains Cahan's best known work.

== Plot summary ==
The book is told in the form of a fictional autobiography of David Levinsky, a Russian Jew who emigrates to America and rises from rags to riches.

=== Book I: Home and School ===
The main character, David Levinsky, is born in 1865 in Antomir, a city of 80,000 in the Kovno district of the Russian Empire (present-day Lithuania). His father dies when he is three, leaving him and his mother to fend for themselves. He grows up in abject poverty. Better off relatives send him to a private cheder for elementary instruction in Judaism and the Torah. Initially bullied by well-off classmates, he eventually becomes one of the tougher kids and excels academically.

=== Book II: Enter Satan ===
At age 13 David finishes his cheder education and begins Talmudic studies in a yeshivah. He meets and befriends Reb (Rabbi) Sender who is supported by his wife while he spends sixteen hours a day studying the Talmud. Reb Sender is one of the most "nimble-minded" scholars in the town, and well liked. He also befriends Naphtali, another student two years ahead of him. David and Naphtali often study together at nightly vigils until morning worshippers come. David begins to feel an inner conflict between the religious instruction he receives and his growing interest in girls. He also thinks of his childhood dislike for Red Esther, the daughter of one of the other families in his basement home. Meanwhile, a Pole moves to Antomir and becomes a regular reader at the synagogue. The Pole has memorized 500 pages of the Talmud, provoking David's jealousy. He redoubles his commitment to Talmudic memorization, but Reb Sender finds out and questions his motivations. This leads to a physical confrontation between David and the Pole.

=== Book III: I Lose my Mother ===
David is harassed in the Horse-market during Passover by a group of gentiles celebrating Easter; one gentile punches him. His mother sees his split lip and, against the advice of neighbors, goes out to set things straight. She is beaten badly, dying that night.

After mourning, David moves into the synagogue, as was often customary for poorer Talmudic students, and continues his studies. As was also customary, he "eats days" at the houses of benefactors, who invite Talmudic scholars for one meal per week. By and large, however, he goes hungry, until Shiphrah Minsker—a rich woman—hears of his plight. Finally well-fed, he resolves to rededicate himself to his studies. However, he finds that the spark has gone out and his interest in the Talmud has seemingly vanished. After the assassination of Czar Alexander II in 1881 and subsequent anti-Jewish riots, many Jews flee the Russian Empire for lands free of religious persecution. David's thoughts now turn to starting a new life in America.

=== Book IV: Matilda ===
David's thoughts and attention have turned from his Talmudic studies towards America. He falls ill and is visited by Shiphrah every day in the hospital. After discharge, Shiphrah takes him into her home while her husband is out of town on business. He meets her daughter, Matilda, who has studied at a boarding school in Germany as well at secular Russian schools. Matilda taunts him in Yiddish while conversing with her friends in Russian, a language David does not understand. She urges him to get an education at a Russian university, but he insists on going to America to work so he can finance his studies. Matilda eventually offers to pay for his journey. Meanwhile, David falls deeply in love with her, culminating in his first kiss. When word arrives that Matilda's father is returning from his business trip, David returns to the synagogue. She stops by to give him the 80 rubles to pay for his passage and wishes him luck. On the eve of the one-year anniversary of his mother's death, he goes to the train station, and is seen off by his friends.

=== Book V: I Discover America ===
David boards a steamer from Bremen to New York. He spends most of the journey praying, reading Psalm 104, and thinking about Matilda. He meets a fellow passenger, Gitelson, and wanders through the city. A man recognizes Gitelson to be a tailor and offers him work. David wanders about and is repeatedly called a greenhorn. At a synagogue he asks to sleep there for the night, but is told repeatedly that "America is not Russia." There he meets Mr. Even, a wealthy Jewish man, who gives him money, clothing, dinner, and a haircut—including the removal of his sidelocks. He arranges for David's lodging and beseeches him to not neglect his religion and his studies.

David spends Even's money on dry goods and begins to work as a peddler, barely getting by. He switches to selling linens, but his heart is not really in it. He is terribly homesick. He spends many of his free evenings reading at the synagogue, yet gradually sheds his Russian-Jewish traits. His overall impression is that America is an impious land.

=== Book VI: A Greenhorn No Longer ===
David reflects on other peddlers, and their coarse and exaggerated stories. One Max Margolis tells him he's a "good-looking chap", and recommends he learn to dance, adding that "every woman can be won." David tries to woo his landlady but she rejects him and says that he is no longer a greenhorn. He tries his former landlady, who kisses him once but rejects further advances. Work is only an obligation which he doesn't like.

He enrolls in night school, learning English and mimicking his teacher's mannerisms. His teacher gives David a copy of Dombey and Son by Charles Dickens. He neglects his work peddling and spends his time reading the book. David is fired but impressed by his own progress learning English. He spends a lot of time in a music shop where he borrows a lot of nickels, dimes, and quarters he is unable to repay.

=== Book VII: My Temple ===
After nearly two years in America, David has a chance encounter with Gitelson, the tailor from the ship. Gitelson is now successful and well-dressed, while David is poor and shabbily dressed. On Gitelson's urging, David begins a 6am-9pm apprenticeship. He begins earning and saving, attending local Jewish theater, and practicing his English. Working 16-hour days and saving aggressively, David hopes to save enough money to support himself so he can attend the City College of New York, to which he refers as his new "temple". During the garment industry's idle season he resume his studies. He shows little interest in socialists and the garment workers union.

=== Book VIII: The Destruction of My Temple ===
He "destroys" his temple by using the money he saved up to start his own business in the garment industry. His first order goes to a company that soon after goes bankrupt, leaving him in terrible debt. When all seems lost, a check at last arrives from the company and he is able to stay afloat. His business slowly starts taking off and he abandons his academic plans for this new commercial enterprise.

=== Book IX: Dora ===
David meets Max's wife Dora, and becomes close with the entire family. He moves in with the family and begins to develop feelings towards Dora. David and the family move to a larger apartment up town, as was the trend to move up in society through the northern development of New York City. He has an affair with Dora (though they never have sex) and his company starts to see real success. Orders begin to increase and he travels out of state to acquire new business. On one such trip, he buys a bracelet for Dora, but she rejects the gift, partly from fear of being found out. Finally, Dora breaks off the affair and demands David move out and sever relations with the family.

=== Book X: On the Road ===
He sets up his business to run while he travels across the country trying to sell his garments, and he goes on and on about selling cloaks.

=== Book XI: Matrimony ===
Through trial and error he is finally matched up with a fiancée. His fortune continues to grow. He and his fellow industry magnates also have to handle labor disputes instigated by socialists.

=== Book XII: Miss Tevkin ===
On his way to visit his fiancée's family, he stops at a resort in the Catskills. There, he is smitten by a woman, Miss Tevkin, who is not attracted to him. Nevertheless, he can't get this woman out of his head, causing him to break off his engagement.

=== Book XIII: At Her Father's House ===
He befriends the Tevkin family and patronizes their socialist causes (she is a socialist) to try and win her favor. However, she rejects his proposal and marries a different suitor.

=== Book XIV: Episodes of a Lonely Life ===
David reflects on how lonely he is and, in spite of his massive financial success, wishes he had led an intellectual rather than commercial life. He says he is deeply unhappy and though many women desire his hand in marriage, the only woman he can think about is Miss Tevkin.

== Musical Adaptation ==
The novel was made into a musical by Isaiah Sheffer and Robert Paul and performed at the 92nd Street Y in New York City in the 1980s.

The musical was performed again by the New Vista Theatre Company in Boynton Beach, Florida, in March 2007. New Vista was founded by |Avi Hoffman, who played the role of the younger David Levinsky in the original production. He played the role of the older David Levinsky in the new production.

=== Off-Broadway ===
1987 saw the opening of what was headlined by UPI as "'The Rise of David Levinsky' is a triumph for off-Broadway" at John Houseman Theater, described as a "tiny theater on West 42nd Street."

== Autobiography ==
Cahan's book is a Rags to riches story that begins with "the metamorphosis" of "arrived .. with four cents in my pocket" to "worth more than two million dollars." His self view is worded as "inner identity .. precisely the same as it was thirty or forty years ago ... devoid of significance."

=== Immigrant ===
The book has been described as "one of the earliest and one of the most notable pieces of Jewish immigrant fiction."

=== Alter Ego ===
To the book's author, Abraham Cahan, who was "the son of a rabbi ... trained as a teacher in the Jewish Folk Schools" described as "a literary realist devoted to presenting real life in fiction," the link from Cahan/Kohen to Levinsky/Levi/Levite is part of his Jewish educational upbringing. An analysis of the book's name says that "Cahan drew the subtitle of his series from The Rise of Silas Lapham (1885) by William Dean Howells, the most influential advocate for realism."

The full title of the McClure's Magazine multi-part series upon which the book was built is The Autobiography of an American Jew: The Rise of David Levinsky. To perfect that "Levinsky is a fully realized character in the novel" the use of the name David, in place of Abraham, is needed, to make "relating his candid autobiography" represent "East European Jewish immigrants like himself." Levinsky is described as being "both narrator and participant."

=== Impact ===
Despite Cahan's impact on what Seth Lipsky calls "newspapering" and various on-stage adaptations and presentations, an 82 page 1983 university thesis concludes by calling The Rise of David Linsky a "somewhat neglected novel novel," which another thesis labeled a "semi-autobiographical work" both by and about someone "torn apart between the American materialism and his spiritual roots."

The book was reprinted in 1993.
