= The Imported Bridegroom, and Other Stories of the New York Ghetto =

1898 book by Abraham Cahan

The Imported Bridegroom, and Other Stories of the New York Ghetto is a book by Abraham Cahan. First published in 1898 by Houghton Mifflin Company it was composed of five stories. The title story was adapted into a movie of the same name by Pamela Berger which was released in 1990.

== Summary ==
The book is composed of five stories, all set in New York City

- Imported Bridegroom
- A Providential Match
- A Sweat-Shop Romance
- Circumstances
- A Ghetto Wedding
