= Jeffrey, Kentucky =

Unincorporated community in Kentucky, United States

- Unincorporated community
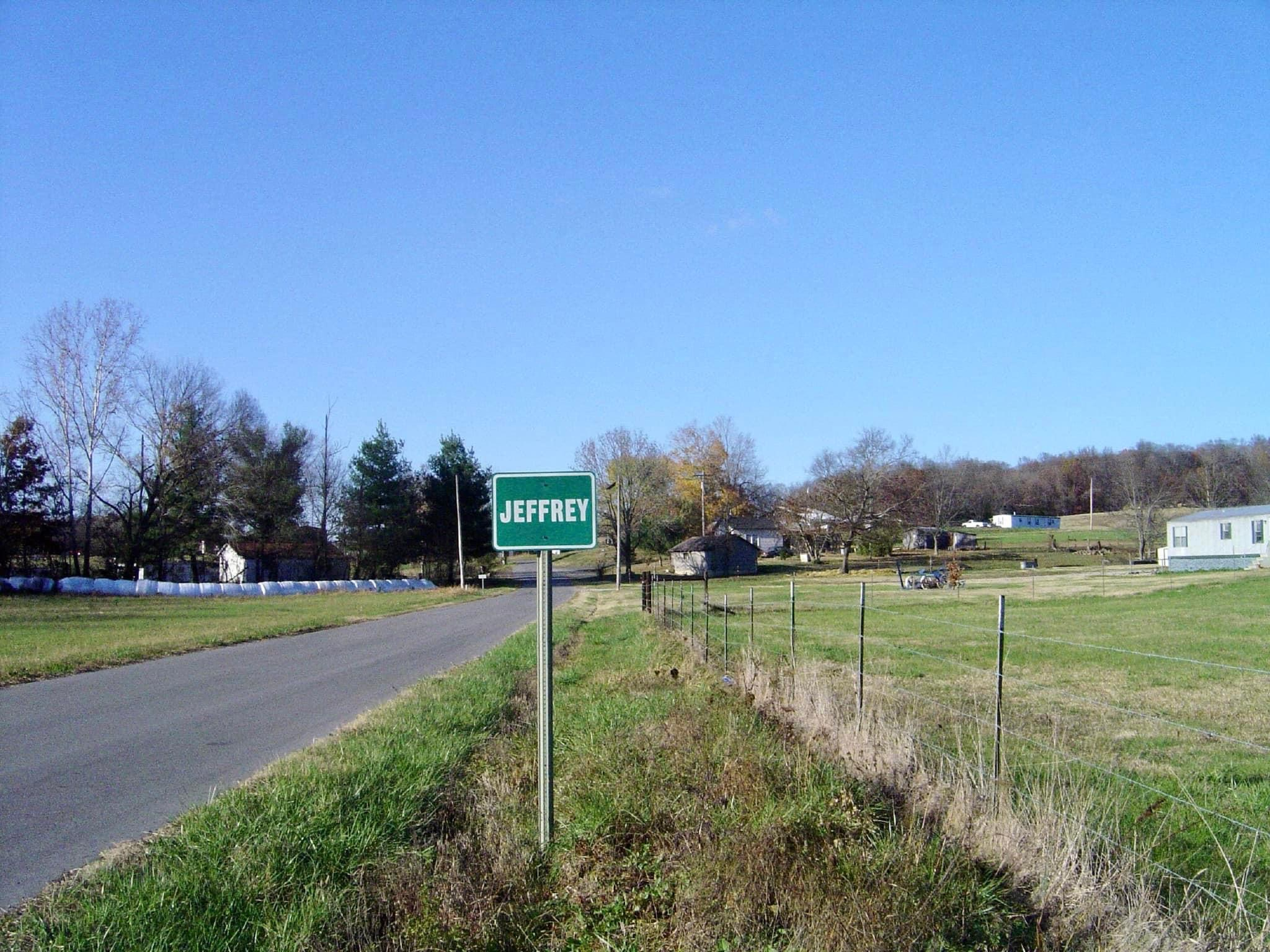

- Location within Kentucky Location within the United States
- Coordinates: 36°45′04″N 85°50′26″W
- Country: United States
- State: Kentucky
- County: Monroe
- Time zone: UTC-6 (Central (CST))
  - Summer (DST): UTC-5 (CDT)
- ZIP codes: 42157
- GNIS feature ID: 4296220

Jeffrey is an unincorporated community located near Peter/s Creek on Bethlehem Church Road, approximately eight miles (13 km) northwest of Tompkinsville, Monroe County, Kentucky, United States.

== History ==
A post office was first established here, March 10, 1903, in the home of postmaster and namesake, Payton J. Jeffrey/s (1865–1926), and his wife, Ella (Arterburn) Jeffrey/s, which was later moved to their general store. Their daughter, Nola (Jeffrey/s) Simmons, was the last postmaster and one of the schoolteachers at the local rural school known as "Mud Slash" (1911–1967). Jeffrey's post office was discontinued March 31, 1937. Payton Jeffrey/s also operated a grist mill located across from his store on Peter/s Creek, succeeded as miller by his son-in-law, George Simmons.

Argil Black, Joe Bowman, William Joseph Burks, Finley Quinn, Leslie Samson, John Bedford Smith, and J. T. Turner were also merchants in this community. William T. Whitehead briefly operated a steam-powered sawmill on Kate Miller Branch of Peter/s Creek nearby. The Ulysses Quinn Family later operated another grist mill on Peter/s Creek located at the intersection of Stringtown-Flippin Road and Bethlehem Church Road nearby.

Jeffrey's general stores and Mud Slash School and mills are gone. Fairview/Mud Slash Baptist Church (est. 1890) remains an active local congregation.
