= Ann Beattie =

American novelist and short story writer

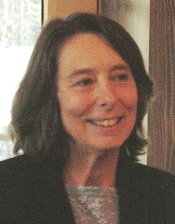
- in April 2006
- Born: September 8, 1947 (age 78); Washington, D.C., U.S.
- Education: Woodrow Wilson High School; American University; University of Connecticut
- Occupations: Short story writer; novelist; professor
- Spouse: Lincoln Perry
- Writing career
- Genre: Literary
- Notable awards: 1992 American Academy of Arts and Letters; 2000 PEN/Malamud Award; 2005 Rea Award for the Short Story

Ann Beattie (born September 8, 1947) is an American novelist and short story writer. She has received an award for excellence from the American Academy and Institute of Arts and Letters and the PEN/Malamud Award for excellence in the short story form.

== Career ==
Born in Washington, D.C., Beattie grew up in Chevy Chase, Washington, D.C., and attended Woodrow Wilson High School. She holds an undergraduate degree from American University and a master's degree from the University of Connecticut.

She gained attention in the early 1970s with short stories published in The Western Humanities Review, Ninth Letter, the Atlantic Monthly, and The New Yorker. Her short story "The Cinderella Waltz" was included in The Norton Anthology of Contemporary Fiction in 1998. In 1976, she published her first book of short stories, Distortions, and her first novel, Chilly Scenes of Winter, which was later made into a film.

Beattie's style has evolved over the years. In 1998, she published Park City, a collection of old and new short stories, about which Christopher Lehman-Haupt wrote in The New York Times:

[The stories] are arranged chronologically, which allows the reader to trace the development of the author's technique. It also lets one see the contrast between the latest stories and the earliest, an experience of sufficient subtlety and complexity to reduce one in this limited space to the following gross generalizations: Gone is the deadpan style of the early and middle stories, in which Ms. Beattie lays out on a dissecting table the behavior of her disaffected post-counterculture yuppies and then leaves it up to the reader to do the anatomizing. Gone, too, are the stabs of lyricism of the middle period, particularly the endings that try poetically to recapitulate the story's action but feel tacked on and artificial. .. In the best of these stories, Ms. Beattie's ability both to commit herself and to knit her commitment into the finest needlework of her artistry contrasts sharply with the irritating moral passivity of her earlier work.

Beattie has taught at Harvard College and the University of Connecticut and was for a long time associated with the University of Virginia, where she was first appointed as a part-time lecturer in 1980. She later became Edgar Allan Poe Chair of the Department of English and Creative Writing in 2000 and remained at UVA until 2013, when she resigned over disappointment at the direction in which the university was heading. In 2005 she was selected as winner of the Rea Award for the Short Story, in recognition of her outstanding achievement in that genre.

Her first novel, Chilly Scenes of Winter (1976), was adapted as a film alternatively titled Chilly Scenes of Winter or Head Over Heels in 1979 by Joan Micklin Silver, starring John Heard, Mary Beth Hurt, Gloria Grahame, and Peter Riegert. The first version was not well received by audiences, though upon its re-release in 1982, with a new title and ending to match that in the book, the movie was successful, and is now considered a cult classic. She was elected a Fellow of the American Academy of Arts and Sciences in 2004.

== Recent works ==
Appraisal of Beattie's recent work has been mixed. Writing in The New York Times, Michiko Kakutani called her novel Mrs. Nixon: A Novelist Imagines a Life (2011) "preposterous," "narcissistic," and "self-indulgent"—the "sort of pretentious volume that makes people hate academics." In The Washington Post, Book World Editor Marie Arana characterized it as "a bill of goods" devoid of "anything resembling a story line" that is "less about the eponymous Mrs. than about an endless parade of wordsmiths trotted out for show." The book "is not, except in the most perfunctory way, about Mrs. Nixon," Arana determined. "It's about Beattie." "[T]he book does not succeed," wrote William Deresiewicz in The Nation. "Its bric-a-brac approach is ultimately wearying: nothing ever quite gets under way. One ends up feeling as if Beattie has spent the whole performance clearing her throat. . . . Her subject often seems a pretext, something just to get the conversation started." By contrast, Dawn Raffel, in the San Francisco Chronicle, called the book "splendidly tricky", "at times... movingly lyrical", and said "Nothing in Mrs. Nixon is perfectly clear, and that is the source of its power."

Mary Pols described her short-story collection The State We're In (2015), which is set in Maine, in The New York Times Book Review as "slippery" and "peculiar." Pols wrote, "I read this collection twice trying to unravel the mystery of what else, beyond Maine, ties these unfinished-feeling stories together."

In a review of Beattie's collection The Accomplished Guest (2017) for The Washington Post, Howard Norman admired Beattie for her "beguiling originality" and determined that "she is one of our few contemporary masters of storytelling." He also wrote, "When I read Beattie's stories, I think of Chekhov's; when I read Chekhov's stories, I think of Beattie's. Both are writers for the ages."

Of Beattie's recent novel A Wonderful Stroke of Luck (2019), Publishers Weekly wrote, "Beattie offers sharp psychological insights and well-crafted prose, but the novel lacks the power and emotional depth of her best work." In The New York Times Book Review, Martha Southgate wrote, "Ultimately, this is a novel in which nothing seems to matter much." She also called the book "shapeless." Southgate nonetheless praised A Wonderful Stroke of Luck for "some elegant sentences and cutting observations that remind a reader of Beattie at her strongest."

Beattie's papers are held by the Albert and Shirley Small Special Collections Library at the University of Virginia.

== Personal life ==
Beattie was married to the writer David Gates. The couple divorced in 1980. In 1985, she met the painter Lincoln Perry, and they married in 1998.

She and Perry both taught at the University of Virginia until 2013. From there they moved together to Key West, Florida, where she continues to write.

In 2005, the two collaborated on a published retrospective of Perry's paintings. Entitled Lincoln Perry's Charlottesville, the book contains an introductory essay and artist's interview by Beattie.

== Bibliography ==
=== Novels ===
- Chilly Scenes of Winter (1976)
- Falling In Place (1981); ISBN 0-679-73192-X
- Love Always (1986); ISBN 0-394-74418-7
- Picturing Will (1989); ISBN 0-517-08094-X
- Another You (1995); ISBN 0-517-17386-7
- My Life, Starring Dara Falcon (1997); ISBN 0-517-28919-9
- The Doctor's House (2002); ISBN 0-7432-3501-0
- Mrs. Nixon: A Novelist Imagines A Life (2011) ISBN 978-1439168714
- A Wonderful Stroke of Luck (2019) ISBN 978-0525557340

=== Short Story Collections ===
- Distortions (1976); ISBN 0-679-73235-7
- Secrets and Surprises (1978); ISBN 0-679-73193-8
- Jacklighting (1981); ISBN 0-911-38102-3
- The Burning House (1982); ISBN 0-679-76500-X
- Spectacles (1985); ISBN 978-0894809262
- Where You'll Find Me and Other Stories (1986); ISBN 0-7432-2678-X
- What Was Mine (1991); ISBN 0-517-10541-1
- Park City (1998); ISBN 0-679-78133-1
- Perfect Recall (2000); ISBN 0-7432-1170-7
- Follies: New Stories (2005); ISBN 0-7432-6962-4
- Walks with Men (2010); ISBN 978-143916-869-1
- The New Yorker Stories (2011); ISBN 1-4391-6875-X
- The State We're In: Maine Stories (2015); ISBN 978-150110-781-8
- The Accomplished Guest (2017); ISBN 978-1-5011-1138-9
- Onlookers: Stories (2023); ISBN 978-166801-365-6

=== Nonfiction ===
- More to Say: Essays and Appreciations (2023); ISBN 978-156792-752-8

Stories

Title	Year	First published	Reprinted/collected	Notes
Major maybe	2015	Beattie, Ann (April 20, 2015). "Major maybe". The New Yorker. Vol. 91, no. 9. pp. 76–79.	The state we're in : Maine stories. New York: Scribner. 2015.	
Walks with men	2010	Beattie, Ann (2010). Walks with men. New York: Scribner.		Novella
Save a horse ride a cowgirl	2015	Beattie, Ann (November 23, 2015). "Save a horse ride a cowgirl". The New Yorker. Vol. 91, no. 37. pp. 94–101.		

=== Articles and other contributions ===
- Beattie, Ann (May 8, 2017). "Flood Airlines". Shouts & Murmurs. The New Yorker. Vol. 93, no. 12. p. 27.

=== Children's books ===
- Spectacles (1985)
