= Swing in the Saddle =

1944 film

- Theatrical release poster
- Directed by: Lew Landers
- Screenplay by: Elizabeth Beecher; Morton Grant; Bradford Ropes
- Story by: Maurice Leo
- Produced by: Jack Fier
- Starring: Jane Frazee; Guinn Williams; Slim Summerville
- Cinematography: Glen Gano; George Meehan
- Edited by: Aaron Stell
- Distributed by: Columbia Pictures Corporation
- Release date: July 31, 1944 (United States)
- Running time: 69 mins.
- Country: United States
- Language: English

Swing in the Saddle is a 1944 American Western musical comedy film directed by Lew Landers and starring Jane Frazee.

== Cast ==
- Jane Frazee as Penny Morrow
- Guinn Williams as "Tiny" Baldwin
- Slim Summerville as Northup "Slim" Bayliss
- Sally Bliss as Judy Bayliss
- Byron Foulger as Sheriff Mort Tucker
- Mary Treen as Addie LaTour
- Red River Dave as Steve Barrett
- Carole Mathews as Doreen Nesbitt
- Hoosier Hot Shots as Musicians/Ranch Hands
- The King Cole Trio as Musicians
- Jimmy Wakely and His Oklahoma Cowboys as Musicians
- Cousin Emmy as Cousin Emmy
