= Chilly Scenes of Winter =

1976 novel by Ann Beattie

- First edition
- Author: Ann Beattie
- Language: English
- Genre: Fiction
- Publisher: Doubleday
- Publication date: 1976
- Publication place: United States
- Media type: Print
- Pages: 280
- ISBN: 0385116586
- OCLC: 2150832
- Dewey Decimal: 813.54
- LC Class: PZ4.B3175

Chilly Scenes of Winter is Ann Beattie's first novel, published by Doubleday in 1976. The marketing copy from the paperback edition declared, "This is the story of a love-smitten Charles; his friend Sam, the Phi Beta Kappa and former coat salesman; and Charles' mother, who spends a lot of time in the bathtub feeling depressed."

The title comes from the Cousin Emmy song Chilly Scenes of Winter from the album The New Lost City Ramblers with Cousin Emmy, which the novel's protagonist Charles listens to. The song tells of the fickle love of an inconstant woman.

== Plot ==
The novel begins in the time between Christmas and New Year's, Charles, several days short of his 27th birthday, is dealing with his mentally ill mother's recent hospitalization. His 19-year-old sister is home from college for the holidays. Neither is fond of their step-father Pete, a friend of their late father, who died of a heart attack at the age of 39. His mother has been hospitalized in a mental institution in the past.

Charles is obsessively in love with Laura, a married woman who once worked as a librarian for his employer. After she left her husband, they lived together briefly, but she returned home. He still yearns for a reconciliation with Laura. He must plow through his dull daily life while dealing with his feelings for her and coping with his family and his friend Sam.

== Film adaptation ==
The novel was adapted into a film, called Head Over Heels in its original 1979 release. It was unsuccessful at the box office. It was re-released with a new ending as Chilly Scenes of Winter in 1982, and turned a profit. Beattie herself had a cameo in the movie. Whereas the first version was faithful to the novel in having an upbeat ending, the second version had a downbeat ending.
