= Lincoln Perry (artist) =

American visual artist

Lincoln Perry (born 1949 in New York City) is an American visual artist and author most well known as a muralist.

== Career ==
Perry is best known for his murals. As well, he has also created sculptures including several series done in terracotta.

Perry currently serves as the distinguished visiting artist at the UVA where he was commissioned to create a very large twelve-panel mural in the McKim, Mead, and White designed Cabell Hall on the University of Virginia Thomas Jefferson designed campus, the title of which is The Student's Progress.

Pablo Picasso, Balthus, Paolo Veronese, Giambattista Tiepolo, and Gustave Courbet have been cited as being amongst his influences.

== Writing ==
Perry is the author of the books Lincoln Perry's Charlottesville (UVA Press 2006) and Seeing Like an Artist: What Artists Perceive in the Art of Others (David R. Godine 2022). Perry is also a contributing writer to The American Scholar. In addition he has written for other journals such as Painters on Paintings.

== Personal life ==
Perry is married to the novelist Ann Beattie whom he met when they were both teaching at the University of Virginia. He lives part of the year in Southern Maine.
