= Cyclone, Kentucky =

Unincorporated community in Kentucky, United States

- Unincorporated community
- Location within Kentucky Location within the United States
- Coordinates: 36°50′15″N 85°40′46″W
- Country: United States
- State: Kentucky
- County: Monroe
- Elevation: 945 ft (288 m)
- Time zone: UTC-6 (Central (CST))
  - Summer (DST): UTC-5 (CDT)
- GNIS feature ID: 507803

Cyclone is an unincorporated community in Monroe County, Kentucky, United States.

A post office named, “Cyclone, Kentucky,” was established in the community in 1891. It was named for a cyclone or tornado that struck the area leaving several people dead, which was one of many tornadoes in a multi-state tornadic event that occurred March 27, 1890.

A tornado also hit Louisville, Kentucky, and only lasted five minutes but destroyed several buildings including the Falls City Hall which buried around 200 people and the Waterworks stand tower which could have potentially cut off the water supply for the entire city.
