= Coe, Kentucky =

Unincorporated community in Kentucky, United States

- Unincorporated community
- Location within Kentucky Location within the United States
- Coordinates: 36°41′00″N 85°33′1″W
- Country: United States
- State: Kentucky
- County: Monroe
- Elevation: 535 ft (163 m)
- Time zone: UTC-6 (Central (CST))
  - Summer (DST): UTC-5 (CDT)
- GNIS feature ID: 507723

Coe is an unincorporated community located in Monroe County, Kentucky, United States.
