= Roseville, Barren County, Kentucky =

Unincorporated community in Kentucky, United States

Roseville, Kentucky
- Unincorporated community
- Location within Kentucky
- Coordinates: 36°53′14″N 85°55′32″W
- Country: United States
- State: Kentucky
- County: Barren
- Elevation: 741 ft (226 m)
- Time zone: UTC-6 (Central (CST))
  - Summer (DST): UTC-5 (CDT)
- Area code: 270
- GNIS feature ID: 502353

Roseville is an unincorporated community in Barren County, Kentucky, United States.

== Geography ==
Roseville is located at the junction of Kentucky Routes 249 and 1318, about 7.5 miles (12.1 km) south of Glasgow.

== Points of interest ==
Landrum, which is listed on the National Register of Historic Places, is located in Roseville.

== Post office ==
Roseville had a post office from 1853 to 1914.
