= Mud Lick, Kentucky =

Unincorporated community in Kentucky, United States

- Unincorporated community
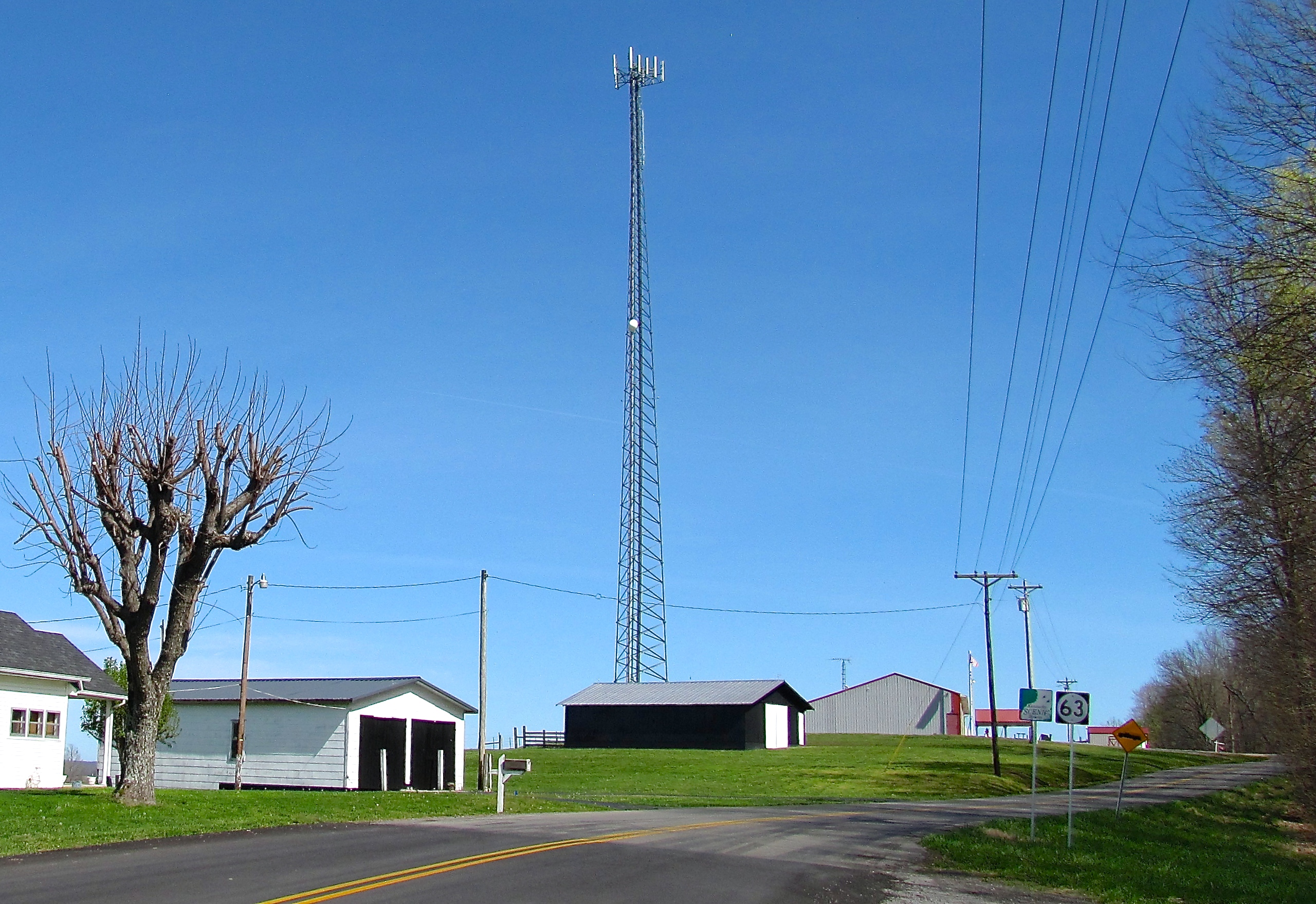
- Kentucky Route 63 in Mud Lick

- Location within Kentucky Location within the United States
- Coordinates: 36°45′10″N 85°46′50″W
- Country: United States
- State: Kentucky
- County: Monroe
- Elevation: 1,027 ft (313 m)
- Time zone: UTC-6 (Central (CST))
  - Summer (DST): UTC-5 (CDT)
- ZIP codes: 42167
- GNIS feature ID: 498989

Mud Lick is a rural unincorporated community in Monroe County, Kentucky, United States. It is concentrated around the intersection of Kentucky Route 63 and Kentucky Route 870, northwest of Tompkinsville.

== History ==
The community is believed to have been named for a salty stream that was frequently rendered muddy by animals drinking from it. Natural mineral licks, whether associated with brine springs or just mineral-rich soils, were frequented by animals that literally licked the ground to ingest the salt or other trace minerals, often creating a muddy surface. Big Bone Lick in Boone County, Kentucky, is a famous example, but many such “licks” were known to American pioneer hunters and settlers. “Sulphur Lick” is a community name of similar origin in northeast Monroe County. A “Large Sulphur Lick” on Indian Creek near Flippin was described in a military survey (1797).

A post office operated at Mud Lick from 1853 until the 1980s.

== In popular culture ==
Former WWE wrestler Hillbilly Jim was billed as being from Mud Lick, Kentucky. He now hosts a radio show, Hillbilly Jim's Moonshine Matinee, on the Sirius XM radio station Outlaw Country (Channel 60), and references himself as broadcasting from Mud Lick, Kentucky.

An X-Files episode, "Kitten" S11 E6 (first aired February 7, 2018) takes place primarily in Mud Lick, with some scenes in Vietnam and FBI Headquarters (Virginia). The premise is that U.S. Marines in Vietnam were exposed to a mind-altering gas, and later subjected to experiments at a facility in Mud Lick, making them see monsters and go on lethal rampages.

In the sitcom Mike & Molly Rondi Reed played Margaret "Peggy" Biggs, the mother of Officer Mike Biggs. Peggy was from “Mud Lick” the topic of which was featured in a couple of episodes.

Mud Lick, in Monroe County, is portrayed in the 1999 documentary film, American Hollow, documenting the close knit Bowling family of Mud Lick Hollow, Kentucky and its almost frozen in time aura. The area filmed by Rory Kennedy also takes place in Saul, Kentucky and is located in Perry County, Kentucky. https://www.kentucky.com/news/local/obituaries/article44071212.html
