= Ken Lauber =

American singer

- Born: Kenneth Lauber; May 14, 1941 (age 84)
- Origin: New York City, U.S.
- Genres: Jazz, film score, country, musical theatre
- Occupations: Composer, musician, singer, playwright, music producer
- Years active: 1964–present
- Website: "Kenlauber.net"

Ken Lauber (born May 14, 1941) is an American composer, arranger producer, musician, singer and playwright.

== Early career ==
Lauber was born in New York City in 1941 and raised on Long Island. His first music lessons of note were drum lessons at the age of thirteen with the drummers Gene Krupa and Cozy Cole. He continued his studies when he entered The Juilliard School of Music in the extension division when he was still in junior and senior high school studying percussion with Morris Goldenberg and Saul Goodman. Between 1960 and 1962 he attended two semesters at Ithaca College to further his percussion studies with Warren Benson. He then returned to The Juilliard School to study music composition with the composer Vincent Persichetti, piano with Rosina Lhévinne and conducting with Jean Morel. In addition he studied orchestration privately with Marion Evans.

In 1964, Lauber worked for United Artists Corporation and scored a seven-minute piano concerto for the film The World of Henry Orient, starring Peter Sellers. He also composed the score to The Drifter, a film by Alex Matter that received international success at the Venice Film Festival. Single recordings under his name from Lilies of the Field, a motion picture starring Sidney Poitier, and the Tony Richardson / Albert Finney film Tom Jones were among some of Lauber's early recordings.

In 1969, Lauber had a singer-songwriter contract with Polydor Records. The album Contemplation View, recorded in Nashville, was part of the label's American debut. Lauber and the musicians backing him were part of another album recorded at the same time, Area Code 615, by the band of the same name. The song "Why Ask Why", from a Burt Reynolds movie originally entitled Fade-In, was part of the group's repertoire and later was also recorded by Leo Kottke.

The album Contemplation View was considered to represent a new genre, resulting in the labeling of Lauber in reviews as one of the innovators of "countrypolitan" music, a combination of country blues and jazz. Two years later, Lauber moved to Los Angeles to continue his film composing activities as well as to record another solo singer-songwriter album, Ken Lauber, for MCA, produced by Val Garay.

== Work for other artists ==
In New York, Nashville, and Los Angeles, Lauber played keyboards, arranged and produced for Richie Havens, Mimi Farina, Waylon Jennings, Johnny Cash, Doc Watson, Bob Macdill, and Sammy Smith. He also worked with Rick Danko and Kinky Friedman on their solo albums as an arranger and pianist. Lauber's compositions and songs have been recorded by some of the greatest jazz, folk and rock artists in American musical history, including Hank Jones, Richie Havens, Joe Cocker, Tim Hardin, Milt Jackson, Ray Brown, Paul Smith, Red Callender, Toots Theilman and Stanley Clark.

== Music in film and television ==
"Music can be a cinematic or theatrical drama's emotional unconscious, a sensory element that supports the audience's suspension of disbelief. The music must create and join with the audience's emotions by blending a drama's characters with the central storyline." Ken Lauber

Between 1973 and 1983, in Los Angeles, Lauber settled into composing for film and television. He scored both original music and adapted period music to the film Hearts of the West, starring Jeff Bridges and original music for the feature films Chilly Scenes of Winter, Peter Fonda’s Wanda Nevada starring Brooke Shields and Fonda, and additional music to Goin' South with Jack Nicholson and Fonda, Emmy Award winning Studs Lonigan and Kent State and contributed dramatic music for multiple episodes of the successful TV series Alfred Hitchcock Presents and Tales from the Darkside.

Another film score includes the original soundtrack score for the documentary film In Search of Kundun with Martin Scorsese.

== Theater music and musicals ==
In 2008, Lauber wrote book, music and lyrics for the stage musical Boperetta. He also in 2012 composed book, music and lyrics for the stage musical ‘Steps with Neil Dearling. Lauber has provided an original, Thelonious Monk-inspired music score for Laurence Holder's bio drama Monk, which completed its first off-Broadway run at the Nuyorican Poets Café. Monk was also performed at the National Black Theater Festival and brought an AUDELCO solo performance of the year award to Rome Neal.

== Other CDs ==
Lauber completed a CD in 2007 entitled O Soul Song for release in Europe by Douglas Records and can be found in Limited Editions on his web site, kenlauber.net. O Soul Song features the esteemed classical Indian bansuri flutist Pt. Hari Prasad Chaurasia.

== Filmography ==
- In Search of Kundun with Martin Scorsese
- Chilly Scenes of Winter
- Hearts of the West
- Wanda Nevada
- Goin' South
- The World of Henry Orient
- Fade In
- The Drifter
- The Chicken Chronicles
- I'll Take Sweden
- The Little Dragons
- The Ransom of Red Chief
- Prime Time
- Scratch Harry
- The Mannequin
- Brand X

== TV movies /series / specials ==
- Studs Lonigan
- Kent State
- Tales from the Darkside
- The Hatfields and the McCoys
- Things in Their Season
- Cry Panic
- Love Story
- Where's Poppa?
- Wide World of Sports (U.S. TV series)
- Journey from Darkness
- Alfred Hitchcock Presents
