= Kentucky Route 249 =

State highway in Kentucky, United States

Kentucky Route 249
- KY 249 highlighted in red

Route information
- Maintained by KYTC
- Length: 20.522 mi (33.027 km)

Major junctions
- South end: KY 100 at Flippin
- KY 921 at Dry Fork; KY 1318 at Roseville
- North end: US 31E Bus. in Glasgow

Location
- Country: United States
- State: Kentucky
- Counties: Monroe, Barren

Highway system
- Kentucky State Highway System; Interstate; US; State; Parkways
← KY 248	→ KY 250

Kentucky Route 249 (KY 249) is a north–south state highway that traverses two counties in South Central Kentucky.

== Route description ==
KY 249 starts in the community of Flippin, in western Monroe County, at an intersection with KY 100. Almost immediately after its start, KY 249 intersects KY 678. It makes its way into Barren County a few miles later and goes through mainly rural areas of Barren County, including the community of Roseville. Once it reaches Glasgow, it crosses the Louie B. Nunn Cumberland Expressway via an overpass, and reaches its northern end at a junction with U.S. Route 31E Business (US 31E Bus.) on the south side of Glasgow not too far from the Southgate Shopping Center and the KY 63 junction.

== Major intersections ==
County	Location	mi	km	Destinations	Notes
Monroe	Flippin	0.000	0.000	KY 100 / Fountain Run Road	Southern terminus
Monroe	Flippin	0.663	1.067	KY 678 / Mud Lick Flippin Road	
Barren	Near Dry Fork	4.673	7.520	KY 921 west / Thomerson Park Road	Eastern terminus of KY 921
Barren	Near Etoile	5.993	9.645	KY 820 east / Caney Fork Road	Western terminus of KY 820
Barren		9.347	15.043	KY 1318 west / Renfro Road	Eastern terminus of KY 1318
Barren	Glasgow	16.892	27.185	US 31E Bus. / South Green Street	Northern terminus
1.000 mi = 1.609 km; 1.000 km = 0.621 mi
