= Meshack, Kentucky =

Unincorporated community in Kentucky, United States

- Unincorporated community
- Location within Kentucky Location within the United States
- Coordinates: 36°43′57″N 85°32′56″W
- Country: United States
- State: Kentucky
- County: Monroe
- Elevation: 561 ft (171 m)
- Time zone: UTC−6 (CST)
  - Summer (DST): UTC−5 (CDT)
- ZIP codes: 42167
- GNIS feature ID: 508595

Meshack is a rural unincorporated community in northwestern Monroe County, Kentucky, United States. The community is located around the intersection of Kentucky Route 100 and Meshack Creek.
