= Flippin, Kentucky =

Unincorporated community in Kentucky, United States

- Unincorporated community
- Location within Kentucky Location within the United States
- Coordinates: 36°43′13″N 85°52′27″W
- Country: United States
- State: Kentucky
- County: Monroe
- Elevation: 735 ft (224 m)
- Time zone: UTC-6 (Central (CST))
  - Summer (DST): UTC-5 (CDT)
- ZIP Codes: 42167, 42133
- Area code: 270
- GNIS feature ID: 492255

Flippin (Note: "Johnstonville" has been erroneously attributed in a more recently published reference source, Kentucky Place Names (1984), as an alternate earlier name for the Flippin community. Collins' History of Kentucky (1874) mentioned the incorporated town of Johnstonville in Monroe County, without noting its location, but failed to mention either Flippin or Pikesville: "The other small villages and post offices in the county are—Martinsburg, on the Cumberland river, 20 miles from Tompkinsville, Johnstonville (incorporated February 13, 1846), Center Point, Gamaliel, Hilton, Fountain Run, Meshach's Run, Mud Lick, Rock Bridge, and Sulphur Lick." Pikesville (1818) as a place name predated the later postal name of Flippin (1858). However, Pikesville, located about 1.25 miles north of the "forks of Indian Creek," was gradually eclipsed by Flippin, which was situated around the juncture of these forks, as the center of the community after the Civil War. Flippin's post office was temporarily discontinued, 1870–1872, which would have been about the time of Collins' period of research for the second edition (1874). Both factors likely account for the omission of Flippin or Pikesville from Collins' list of Monroe County's "small villages and post offices" that appeared in the second edition, although not a comprehensive list in any case. "Johnstonville" in Monroe County was incorporated by an Act (Chapter 164, February 13, 1846) of the Kentucky General Assembly, and its location on John Black's land in Monroe County on the south side of Cumberland River was clearly identified in the articles of incorporation. Johnstonville and Pike(s)ville of Monroe County both appear on the map of Kentucky included in the Official Atlas of the Civil War, with Johnstonville correctly located near the Cumberland River and Pike(s)ville near Indian Creek. Johnstonville, originally planned as a town near present-day Black's Ferry, evidently failed and had disappeared from maps by the 20th century, and is largely forgotten, today.) is an unincorporated community located in Monroe County, Kentucky, United States. A small residential village and community surround the intersections of Kentucky Route 249, Kentucky Route 678, and Kentucky Route 100, approximately 3.6 miles (5.8 km) south of the Monroe-Barren County line, where the South Fork and main stream of Indian Creek converge.

== History ==
This locale was originally identified as the "forks of Indian Creek" and later known as "Pikesville", which was established as a town here by Barren County (Kentucky) Court in August, 1818, although Pikesville was located about 1.25 miles north on Pikesville Branch of Indian Creek. The postal name, "Flippin", was first used to avoid confusion with "Pikeville", county seat of Pike County, Kentucky, when a post office was permanently established here in 1858. Flippin's post office was discontinued in 1964.

== See also ==
- Flippin, Arkansas
- Pikesville, Maryland
