= Sulphur Lick, Kentucky =

Unincorporated community in Kentucky, United States

- Unincorporated community
- Location within Kentucky Location within the United States
- Coordinates: 36°48′19″N 85°44′19″W
- Country: United States
- State: Kentucky
- County: Monroe
- Elevation: 843 ft (257 m)
- Time zone: UTC−6 (CST)
  - Summer (DST): UTC−5 (CDT)
- ZIP codes: 42167
- GNIS feature ID: 509157

Sulphur Lick is a rural unincorporated community in northwestern Monroe County, Kentucky, United States. The community is located around the intersection of Kentucky Route 678 and Kentucky Route 839.

“‘It was named for the licks on Sulphur Creek (now Skaggs) where buffalo, deer, and other animals would gather from pastures of grass and cane to lick the salt and sulphur from the rocks along the creek bed. A sulphur spring exists within 1 mi. of this place.’ (By members of the Sulphur Lick Homemakers Club. ‘Sulphur Lick History Told by Women of the Community’ in the 50th anniversary edition of The Tompkinsville News, 10/28/1954).”
