= Joan Micklin Silver =

American film and theater director (1935–2020)

- Born: Joan Micklin; May 24, 1935; Omaha, Nebraska, U.S.
- Died: December 31, 2020 (aged 85); New York City, U.S.
- Occupation: Filmmaker
- Years active: 1972–2003
- Spouse: Raphael D. Silver (m. 1956; died 2013)
- Children: 3, including Marisa

Joan Micklin Silver (May 24, 1935 – December 31, 2020) was an American director of films and plays, screenwriter and playwright. Born in Omaha, Silver moved to New York City in 1967 where she began writing and directing films. She is best known for her debut film Hester Street (1975) and the romantic comedy Crossing Delancey (1988).

== Early life and education ==
Joan Micklin was born on May 24, 1935, in Omaha, Nebraska, the daughter of Doris (Shoshone) and Maurice David Micklin, who operated the family-founded lumber company. Her parents were Russian Jewish immigrants. She received her B.A. from Sarah Lawrence College in 1956. That same year, she married Raphael D. Silver, a real estate developer. They had three daughters, and remained married until his death in 2013. One of their children, Marisa Silver, is herself a film director and author. Raphael's father was Rabbi Abba Hillel Silver. Joan and Raphael lived in Cleveland from 1956 to 1967, where she taught music and wrote and directed plays.

== Career ==
Silver's film career began when she moved to New York City in 1967. She was a writer for The Village Voice before she started her career in film. In the 1960s, she began writing scripts for children's educational films produced by Encyclopædia Britannica and the Learning Corporation of America, for which she directed three short films: The Case of the Elevator Duck, The Fur Coat Club, and The Immigrant Experience: The Long Long Journey. The Immigrant Experience, about Polish immigrants to America, was well received and is considered to be the immediate predecessor to Hester Street (1975).

She reflected in one interview that the barriers to women's entry into filmmaking were so steep in the early 1970s that "I had absolutely no chance of getting work as a director." In a 1979 American Film Institute interview, she quoted a studio executive who told her bluntly, "Feature films are very expensive to mount and distribute, and women directors are one more problem we don’t need." Before beginning her career as a director, Silver worked as a writer; she sold a script entitled Limbo to Universal Pictures in 1972. Limbo, a collaboration with Linda Gottlieb, was about the wives of Vietnam War prisoners of war.

Silver's first feature film as a director, Hester Street (1975), was based on a short story by Abraham Cahan, and produced by Midwest Films, a company Silver founded with her husband. It was produced on the relatively small budget of $320,000. The New York Times later called Midwest "one of the most successful mom-and-pop operations in the film business". Raphael grew motivated to become involved with her film career out of frustration with the opportunities he saw her being denied. The film, about Russian Jewish immigrants to the Lower East Side, featured dialogue in Yiddish. She made it in 34 days. Hester Street received a Best Actress Oscar nomination for actress Carol Kane. The film was screened at Cannes and received wide acclaim. The success of Hester Street allowed the Silvers to begin work on Joan's next project, the 1977 film Between the Lines. Between the Lines, filmed in Boston, was entered into the 27th Berlin International Film Festival.

Chilly Scenes of Winter (1979), originally released as Head over Heels, was less of a triumph. United Artists, the major studio that produced Chilly Scenes, changed the film's name and edited in a happy ending, suggesting that "market research" justified the change in title. Chilly Scenes did not receive the same warm reception as Silver's earlier films, but a 1982 re-edit of the film (complete with the intended title reinstated) received better notice and the film has been labeled as a cult hit.

Silver is known for the film Crossing Delancey (1988), a romantic comedy starring Amy Irving about a bookstore clerk with career aspirations in the literary world, who is concerned about concealing her "Lower East Side roots". This project too ran into roadblocks: studio executives told Silver that Crossing Delancey was too "ethnic". Eventually Steven Spielberg (then married to the film's star Amy Irving) intervened in support of Silver's project and Warner Bros. distributed the film.

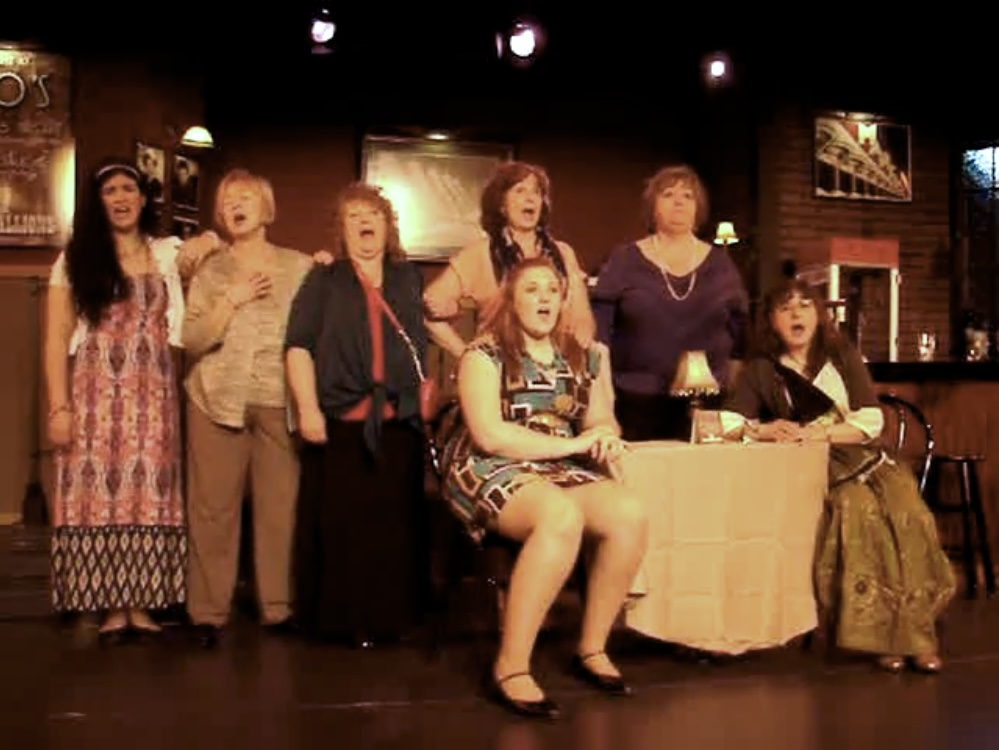
A 2013 production of A... My Name is Alice

Silver also conceived and directed the musical revue A... My Name Is Alice with Julianne Boyd, which she and Boyd intended as "a glimpse at the achievements and potential of women in the '80s".

In a 1989 interview, Silver identified the films Shadow of a Doubt (1943), Presenting Lily Mars (1943), and Song of the Islands (1942) as early influences. She also noted that, while she admired the work of François Truffaut, she felt an affinity with Satyajit Ray.

Silver died of vascular dementia at her home in Manhattan on December 31, 2020, at age 85. A posthumous stage adaptation of Hester Street debuted in 2024.

== Filmography (director) ==
- The Immigrant Experience: The Long Long Journey (1972 short)
- The Case of the Elevator Duck (1974 short)
- Hester Street (1975)
- Bernice Bobs Her Hair (1976 TV film)
- Between the Lines (1977)
- Chilly Scenes of Winter (Head Over Heels) (1979)
- How to Be a Perfect Person in Just Three Days (1983 TV film)
- Finnegan Begin Again (1985 TV film)
- Crossing Delancey (1988)
- Loverboy (1989)
- Prison Stories: Women on the Inside (1991 TV film) - segment 2
- Big Girls Don't Cry... They Get Even (1992)
- A Private Matter (1992 TV film)
- In the Presence of Mine Enemies (1997 TV film)
- Invisible Child (1999 TV film)
- A Fish in the Bathtub (1999)
- Charms for the Easy Life (2002 TV film)
- Hunger Point (2003 TV film)

== Awards ==
- 1975: International Filmfestival Mannheim-Heidelberg - Interfilm Award for Hester Street
- 1977 Los Angeles Film Critics Association Awards - New Generation Award
- 1977: Berlin International Film Festival - Interfilm Award/Otto Dibelius Film Award for Between the Lines
- 1985: Locarno International Film Festival - second prize for Finnegan Begin Again

== Sources ==
- Cole, Janis; Dale, Holly (1993). "Joan Micklin Silver". Calling the Shots: Profiles of Women Filmmakers. Quarry Press. pp. 203–213. ISBN 1-55082-085-0. OCLC 39763692.
- Gallagher, John (1989). Film Directors on Directing. Praeger. OCLC 1034675042.
