= Abraham Cahan =

Lithuanian-born Jewish American novelist

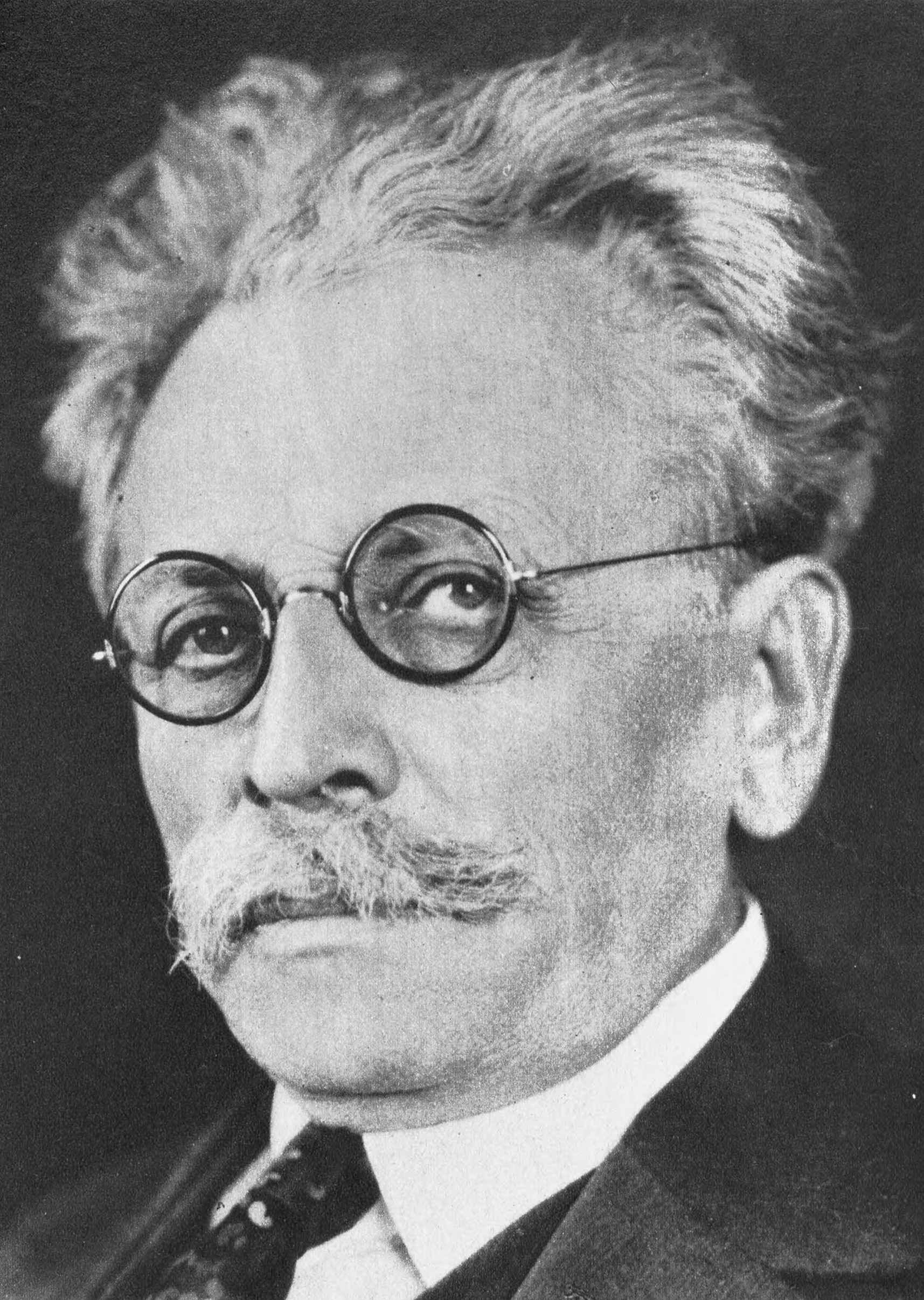
- Cahan c. 1937
- Born: July 7, 1860; Paberžė, Vilna Governorate, Russian Empire (now Lithuania)
- Died: August 31, 1951 (aged 91); New York City, U.S.
- Education: Teachers Institute of Vilnius
- Occupations: Newspaper editor, writer
- Writing career
- Language: Yiddish, English

Abraham "Abe" Cahan (Yiddish: אַבֿרהם קאַהאַן; July 7, 1860 – August 31, 1951) was a Lithuanian-born Jewish-American socialist newspaper editor, novelist, and politician. Cahan was one of the founders of The Forward (Yiddish: פֿאָרווערטס, romanized: Forverts, lit. 'Forward!'), an American Yiddish publication, and was its editor-in-chief for 43 years. During his stewardship of the Forward, it became a prominent voice in the Jewish community and in the Socialist Party of America, voicing a relatively moderate stance within the realm of American socialist politics.

== Early life and childhood ==
Abraham Cahan was born July 7, 1860, in Paberžė in Lithuania (at the time in Vilnius Governorate, Russian Empire), into an Orthodox, Litvak family. His grandfather was a rabbi in Vidz, Vitebsk, his father a teacher of Hebrew and the Talmud. The devoutly religious family moved to Vilnius in 1866, where the young Cahan studied to become a rabbi. He, however, was attracted by secular knowledge and clandestinely studied Russian, ultimately demanding that his parents allow him to enter the Teachers Institute of Vilnius from which he graduated in 1881. He was appointed as a teacher in a Jewish school funded by the Russian government in Velizh, Vitebsk, in the same year.

=== Immigration to the United States ===
In Tsarist Russia, repression from both the government and the Russian Orthodox Church restricted the travel, settlement, and educational opportunities of Jewish subjects, who were subject to discrimination and brutality. By 1879, when Cahan was still a teenager, he had associated himself with the growing radical revolutionary movement in Russia. After the Emperor Alexander II of Russia was assassinated by a member of the Narodnaya Volya in March 1881, all revolutionary sympathizers became suspect to the Russian police. In 1882 the Russian police searched Cahan's room for radical publications that could be linked to the revolutionaries. The visit from the police prompted the young socialist schoolteacher to join the great emigration of Russian Jews to the United States. Cahan arrived by steamboat in Philadelphia on June 6 of 1882 at the age of 21 and immediately traveled to New York City, where he would live for the rest of his life.

== Career ==
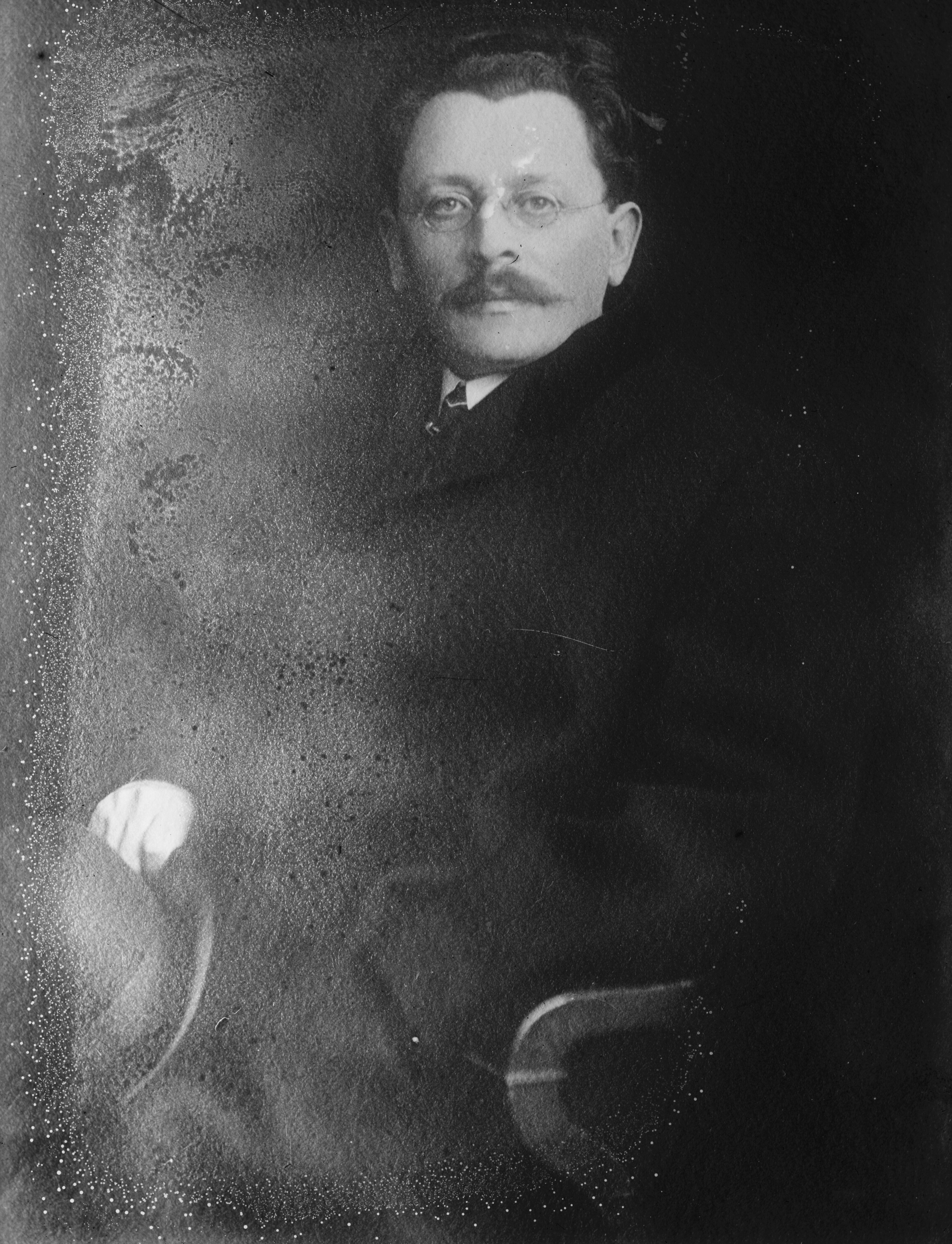
Cahan c. 1900s

In July 1882, barely a month after arriving in the United States, Cahan attended his first American socialist meeting, and a month later he gave his first socialist speech, speaking in Yiddish. Although he found American society to be a vast improvement over life in Russia, he began to express certain criticisms of American conditions from a Marxist perspective.

Cahan quickly mastered English. In addition to writing for various publications, by 1883 he dedicated much of his time to teaching English to working class Jewish immigrants. He taught at the Young Men's Hebrew Association (YMHA) and often incorporated socialist speeches into his lesson plans. He also briefly taught in the English Department at the Orthodox Etz Chaim Yeshiva. Cahan formally joined the Socialist Labor Party of America in 1887. Cahan's education in Russian and English and his literary and journalistic abilities allowed him to excel as a socialist, and toward the end of his career he was considered a leading figure of the radical Jewish left.

In keeping with his socialist politics, Cahan believed that immigrants needed to combine formal learning with informal studies about local life and community customs to achieve not only an education but also integration into American society. He also encouraged women to use labor and education to elevate their status in society.

=== The Jewish Daily Forward ===
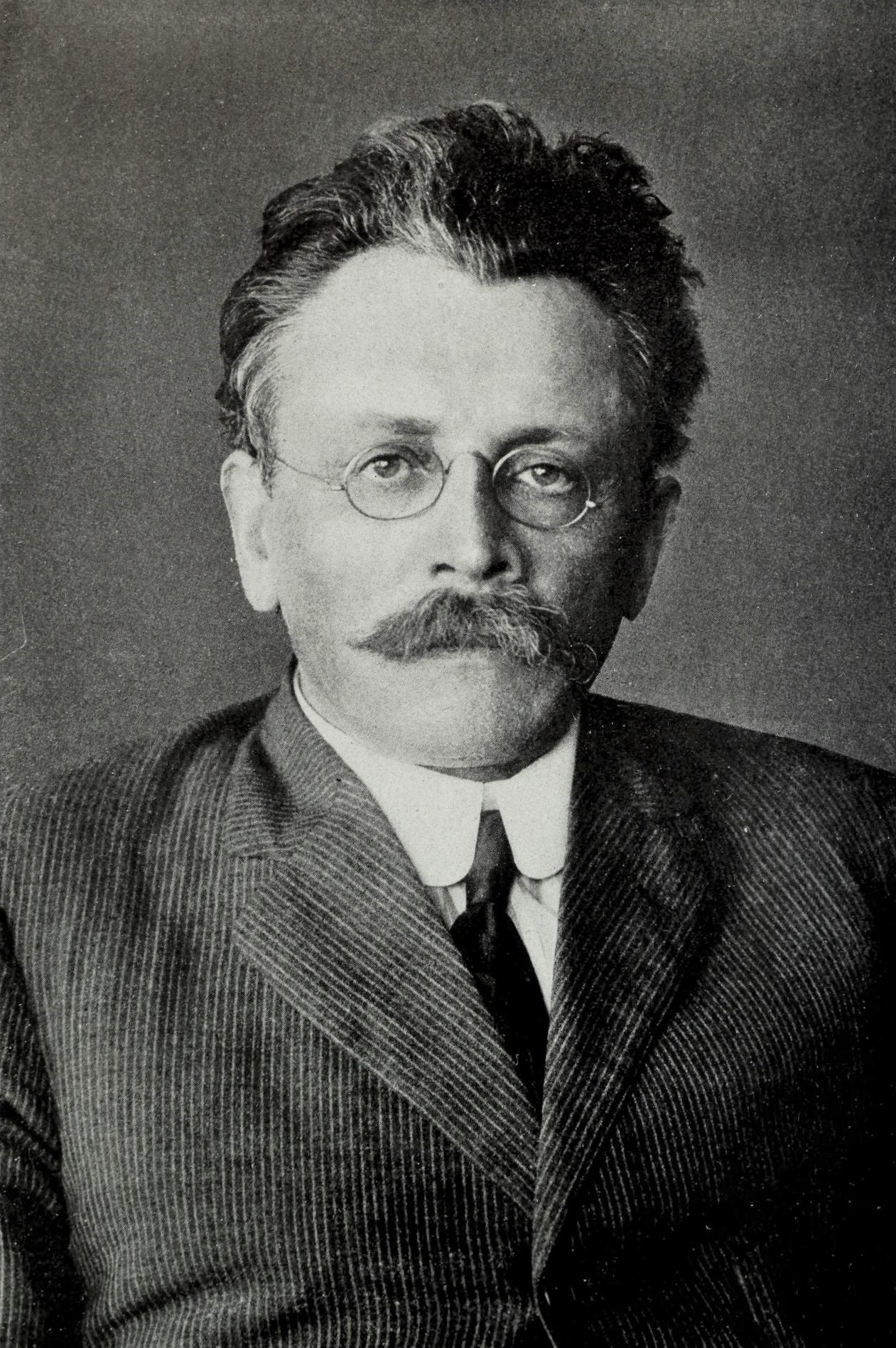
Cahan c. 1913

Soon after arriving in America Cahan wrote articles on socialism and science, and translated literary works for the pages of the Yiddish language newspaper of the Socialist Labor Party, the Arbeiter Zeitung (Yiddish: אַרבעטער צייטונג, lit. 'Worker's Newspaper') Cahan edited the Arbeiter Zeitung from 1891 to 1895, and followed that position with an editorship at the paper Di Tsukunft (Yiddish: די צוקונפֿט, lit. 'The Future') through 1887. Afterward, Cahan was made a full-time reporter for the New York Commercial Advertiser, and it was this position as an apprentice of reporter Lincoln Steffens that prepared Cahan for his coming role as a founding editor of the Jewish Daily Forward. Cahan founded the Forward while he was still juggling several newspaper jobs and published its first issue in 1897.

The horror of the Kishinev pogrom, which the Forward covered extensively, prompted Cahan to take on leadership of the Forward full-time in 1903, taking over total editorial control and running the newspaper full-time until 1946. In his years working at the Forward, Cahan transformed the self-identified socialist newspaper from an obscure paper with only 6000 readers to the forefront of Yiddish journalism. The Jewish Daily Forward became a symbol of American socialism and Jewish immigration, and assumed the role of an Americanizing agent instructing its readers in the social, economic, political, and cultural aspects of the United States. Cahan received criticism from fellow Jewish journalists because he didn't limit the Forward to Jewish topics, but wrote on a variety of themes and was one of the more temperate voices in the Socialist Party of America, respecting his readers' religious beliefs and preaching an increasingly moderate and reformist form of socialist politics as time progressed.

=== Fiction writing ===
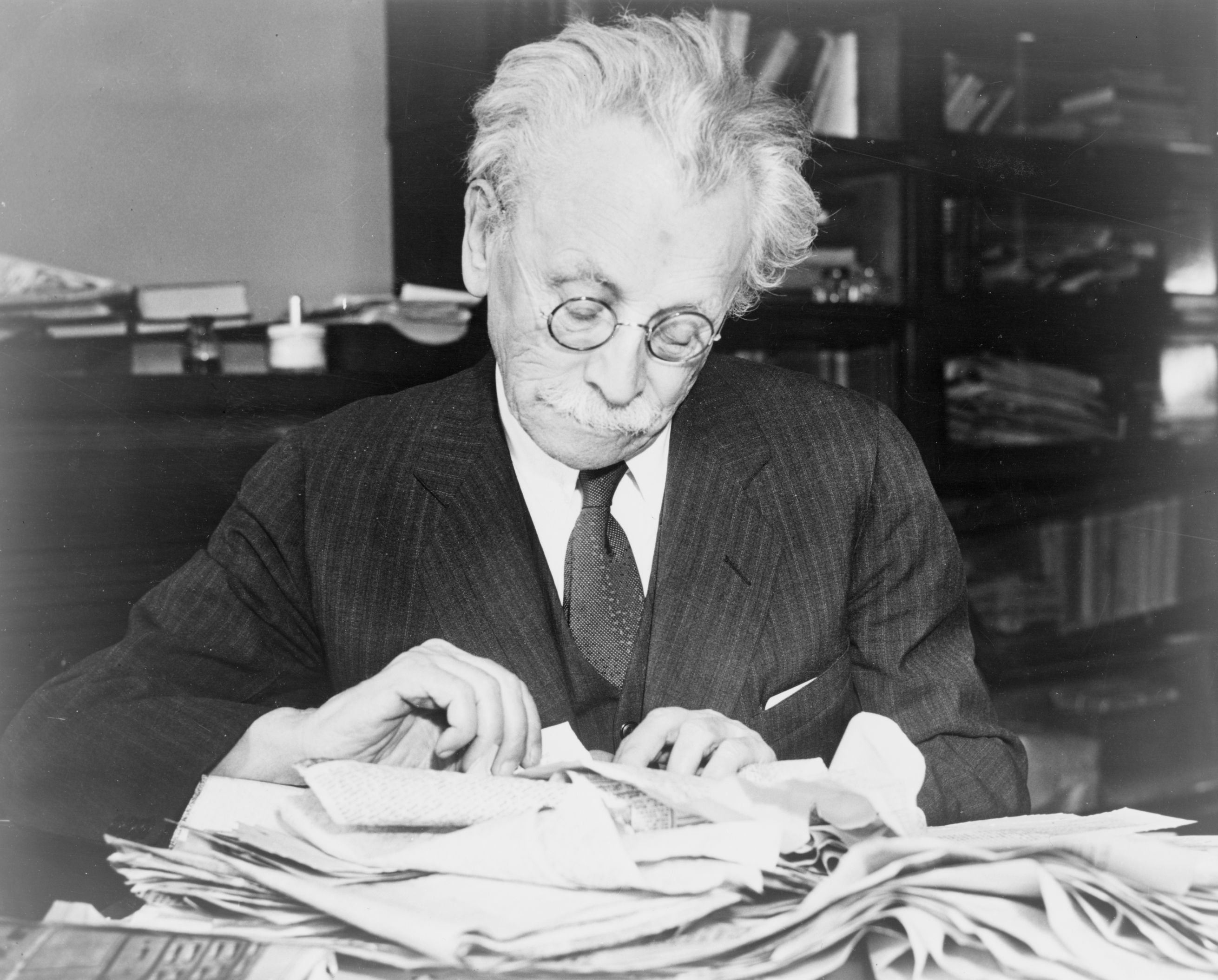
Abraham Cahan in his later years.

Cahan distinguished himself through not only Yiddish literature but also his English fiction that dealt with the sociological and historical process of immigrants becoming Americans. By 1896, Cahan had published his first short story, "A Providential Match", and just a year later he published his first novel, Yekl: A Tale of the New York Ghetto (later filmed as Hester Street). By 1901, Cahan had published six of his stories in a variety of popular magazines. Cahan's most popular novel was The Rise of David Levinsky, a semi-autobiographical account that mirrored Cahan's own experiences of immigration, describing a Jewish immigrant's process of Americanization and showcasing the Jewish-socialist cultural establishments in New York.

== Death and legacy ==
Cahan died of congestive heart failure on August 31, 1951, at the age of 91, in Beth Israel Hospital in New York City. He was buried in Mount Carmel Cemetery in Queens, New York.

Cahan's education of immigrants, his work through the Jewish Daily Forward, and his commitment to socialism influenced the Jewish immigrants in New York who came into contact with his work. In addition to influencing American Jewish culture, his works were published in Russia, leaving a mark on the Russian Jewish workers' movement.

== Works ==
- "A Dream No Longer," New York Call, vol. 11, no. 129 (May 31, 1918), pg. 6.
- The Rise of David Levinsky. Harper Torch Books (1917; 1945; 1960)
- "The Education of Abraham Cahan." Translation of Bleter Fun Mein Leben, Volumes I and II by Leon Stein, Abraham Conan, and Lynn Davison. Philadelphia: Jewish Publication Society of America, 1969.
- "Bleter Fun Mein Leben"
- The Imported Bridegroom, and Other Stories of the New York Ghetto, 1898, Boston, New York, Houghton, Mifflin and company.
- Yekl: A Tale of the New York Ghetto. New York D. Appleton and Company 1896.

== See also ==
- Yiddish literature
- Yiddishist movement
- History of the socialist movement in the United States
- Democratic socialism
- Jewish views and involvement in US politics
- General Jewish Labour Bund in Lithuania, Poland and Russia
