= Monroe County, Kentucky =

County in Kentucky, United States

- County
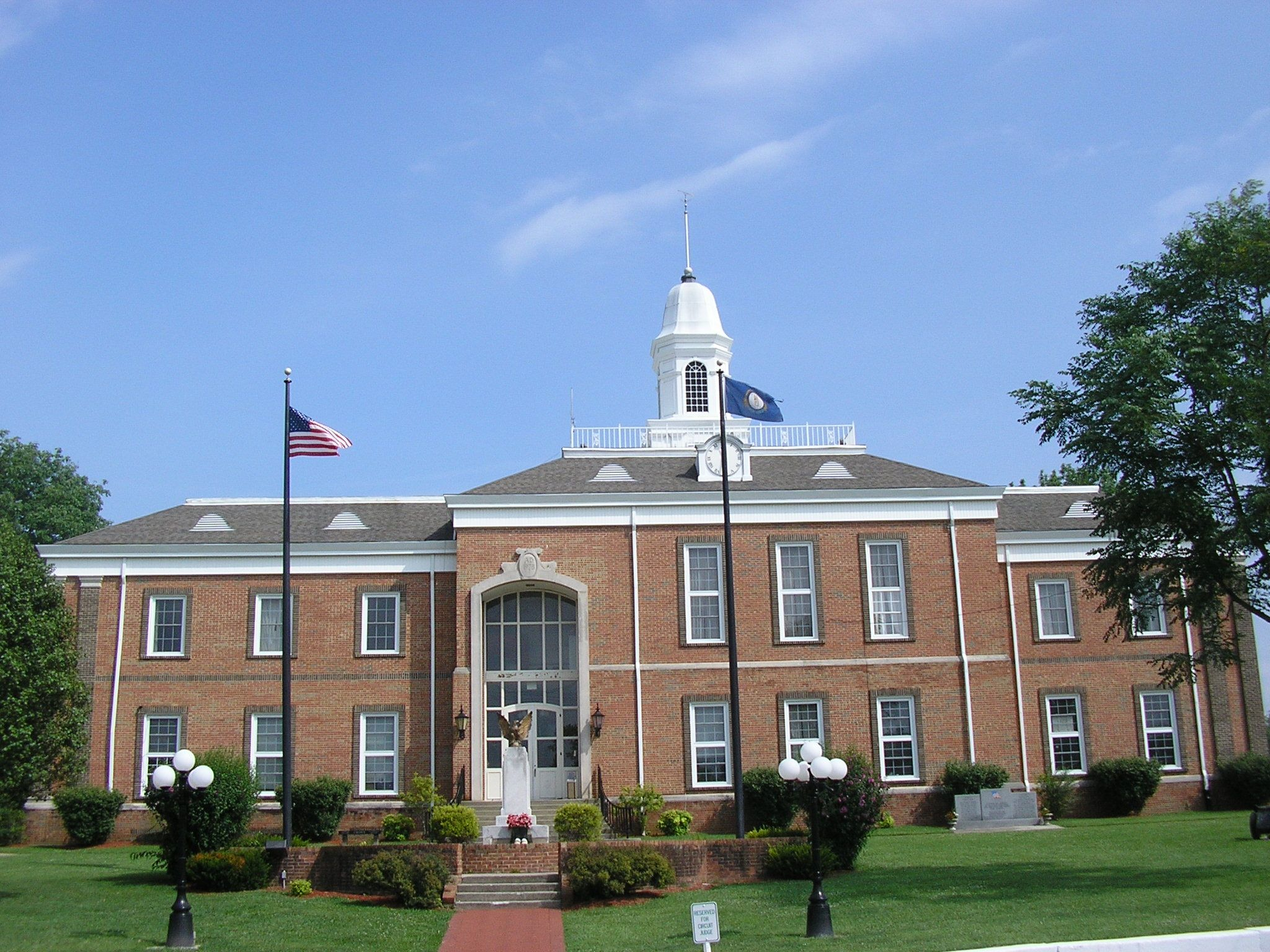
- Monroe County courthouse in Tompkinsville

- Location within the U.S. state of Kentucky
- Coordinates: 36°43′N 85°43′W
- Country: United States
- State: Kentucky
- Founded: 1820
- Named for: James Monroe
- Seat: Tompkinsville
- Largest city: Tompkinsville

Government
  - Judge/Executive: Mitchell Page (R)

Area
  - Total: 332 sq mi (860 km^{2})
  - Land: 329 sq mi (850 km^{2})
  - Water: 2.7 sq mi (7.0 km^{2}) 0.8%

Population (2020)
  - Total: 11,338
  - Estimate (2025): 11,191 ▼
  - Density: 34.5/sq mi (13.3/km^{2})
- Time zone: UTC−6 (Central)
  - Summer (DST): UTC−5 (CDT)
- Congressional district: 1st
- Website: monroecounty.ky.gov

Monroe County is a county located in the Eastern Pennyroyal Plateau region of the U.S. state of Kentucky. Its county seat is Tompkinsville. The county is named for President James Monroe. It was a prohibition or dry county until November 7, 2023, when voters approved the sale of alcohol.

== History ==
Monroe County is the only county of the 3,144 in the United States named for a President where the county seat is named for his vice-president. The county was formed in 1820; and named for James Monroe the fifth President, author of the Monroe Doctrine. The county seat was named for Daniel Tompkins. They both served from 1817 to 1825.

Confederate Gen. John Hunt Morgan's first Kentucky raid occurred here on July 9, 1862. Morgan's Raiders, coming from Tennessee, attacked Major Thomas J. Jordan's 9th Pennsylvania Cavalry at USA garrison. Raiders captured 30 Union soldiers and destroyed tents and stores. They took 20 wagons, 50 mules, 40 horses, sugar and coffee supplies. At Glasgow they burned supplies, then went north, raiding 16 other towns before returning to Tennessee.

President Abraham Lincoln's half third cousin, Thomas Lincoln (1780–1844), lived in the Meshack Creek area of present-day Monroe County and served two terms as constable of Cumberland County in 1802 and 1804. In 1810 he left Kentucky and migrated to Ohio and Indiana. In 1799 he married Patsy Gee from Meshack Creek.

Home of the Old Mulkey Meetinghouse State Historic Site. The 20-acre (81,000 m^{2}) park features the oldest log meetinghouse in Kentucky, built in 1804 during a period of religious revival. Many Revolutionary War soldiers and pioneers, including Daniel Boone's sister, Hannah, are buried there. The structure has twelve corners in the shape of a cross and three doors, symbolic of the Holy Trinity. The Old Mulkey Church, originally called the Mill Creek Baptist Church, was established by a small band of pioneer Baptists from North and South Carolina and led by Philip Mulkey. The site became part of the park system in 1931.

== Geography ==
According to the U.S. Census Bureau, the county has a total area of 332 square miles (860 km^{2}), of which 329 square miles (850 km^{2}) is land and 2.7 square miles (7.0 km^{2}) (0.8%) is water.

=== Adjacent counties ===
- Barren County (northwest)
- Metcalfe County (northeast)
- Cumberland County (east)
- Clay County, Tennessee (southeast)
- Macon County, Tennessee (southwest)
- Allen County (west)

== Demographics ==
Historical population
Census	Pop.	Note	%±
1830	5,340		—
1840	6,526		22.2%
1850	7,756		18.8%
1860	8,551		10.3%
1870	9,231		8.0%
1880	10,741		16.4%
1890	10,989		2.3%
1900	13,053		18.8%
1910	13,663		4.7%
1920	14,214		4.0%
1930	13,077		−8.0%
1940	14,070		7.6%
1950	13,770		−2.1%
1960	11,799		−14.3%
1970	11,642		−1.3%
1980	12,353		6.1%
1990	11,401		−7.7%
2000	11,756		3.1%
2010	10,963		−6.7%
2020	11,338		3.4%
2025 (est.)	11,191	▼	−1.3%
U.S. Decennial Census; 1790-1960 1900-1990; 1990-2000 2010-2021

=== 2020 census ===
As of the 2020 census, the county had a population of 11,338. The median age was 42.1 years. 23.5% of residents were under the age of 18 and 19.5% of residents were 65 years of age or older. For every 100 females there were 100.6 males, and for every 100 females age 18 and over there were 96.2 males age 18 and over.

The racial makeup of the county was 92.5% White, 1.9% Black or African American, 0.3% American Indian and Alaska Native, 0.1% Asian, 0.0% Native Hawaiian and Pacific Islander, 2.4% from some other race, and 2.7% from two or more races. Hispanic or Latino residents of any race comprised 4.2% of the population.

0.0% of residents lived in urban areas, while 100.0% lived in rural areas.

There were 4,557 households in the county, of which 30.2% had children under the age of 18 living with them and 26.9% had a female householder with no spouse or partner present. About 29.6% of all households were made up of individuals and 15.5% had someone living alone who was 65 years of age or older.

There were 5,237 housing units, of which 13.0% were vacant. Among occupied housing units, 70.8% were owner-occupied and 29.2% were renter-occupied. The homeowner vacancy rate was 0.5% and the rental vacancy rate was 7.7%.

=== 2000 census ===
As of the census of 2000, there were 11,756 people, 4,741 households, and 3,380 families residing in the county. The population density was 36 per square mile (14/km^{2}). There were 5,288 housing units at an average density of 16 per square mile (6.2/km^{2}). The racial makeup of the county was 95.57% White, 2.76% Black or African American, 0.13% Native American, 0.01% Asian, 0.03% Pacific Islander, 0.93% from other races, and 0.59% from two or more races. 1.45% of the population were Hispanic or Latino of any race.

There were 4,741 households, out of which 31.10% had children under the age of 18 living with them, 57.40% were married couples living together, 10.40% had a female householder with no husband present, and 28.70% were non-families. 26.30% of all households were made up of individuals, and 12.60% had someone living alone who was 65 years of age or older. The average household size was 2.45 and the average family size was 2.94.

In the county, the population was spread out, with 23.90% under the age of 18, 8.90% from 18 to 24, 27.70% from 25 to 44, 24.30% from 45 to 64, and 15.30% who were 65 years of age or older. The median age was 38 years. For every 100 females there were 94.20 males. For every 100 females age 18 and over, there were 91.00 males.

The median income for a household in the county was $22,356, and the median income for a family was $27,112. Males had a median income of $21,820 versus $17,783 for females. The per capita income for the county was $14,365. About 20.00% of families and 23.40% of the population were below the poverty line, including 27.60% of those under age 18 and 30.30% of those age 65 or over. The county has long been a "persistent poverty" county as defined by the Appalachian Regional Commission.

== Communities ==
=== Cities ===
- Fountain Run
- Gamaliel
- Tompkinsville (county seat)

=== Unincorporated communities ===
- Akersville
- Alexander
- Boyd
- Bugtussle
- Center Point
- Coe
- Coon’s Foot
- Cyclone
- Ebenezer
- Emberton
- Flippin
- Gum Tree
- Hestand
- Jeffrey
- Lamb
- Meshack
- Mount Hermon
- Mud Lick
- Otia
- Persimmon
- Raydure
- Rockbridge
- Stringtown
- Sulphur Lick
- Vernon

== Politics ==
United States presidential election results for Monroe County, Kentucky
Year	Republican		Democratic		Third party(ies)	
Year	No.	%	No.	%	No.	%
1912	1,072	41.81%	806	31.44%	686	26.76%
1916	2,008	69.29%	882	30.43%	8	0.28%
1920	3,426	75.31%	1,108	24.36%	15	0.33%
1924	2,489	71.18%	970	27.74%	38	1.09%
1928	3,127	78.59%	843	21.19%	9	0.23%
1932	2,559	61.07%	1,620	38.66%	11	0.26%
1936	2,345	63.28%	1,352	36.48%	9	0.24%
1940	3,321	70.33%	1,390	29.44%	11	0.23%
1944	3,648	76.82%	1,101	23.18%	0	0.00%
1948	2,812	68.04%	1,249	30.22%	72	1.74%
1952	3,675	77.22%	1,084	22.78%	0	0.00%
1956	3,759	74.97%	1,255	25.03%	0	0.00%
1960	4,337	81.72%	970	18.28%	0	0.00%
1964	3,293	65.73%	1,713	34.19%	4	0.08%
1968	4,086	76.06%	693	12.90%	593	11.04%
1972	3,770	82.57%	768	16.82%	28	0.61%
1976	3,352	69.91%	1,412	29.45%	31	0.65%
1980	4,592	79.00%	1,156	19.89%	65	1.12%
1984	4,760	81.47%	1,052	18.00%	31	0.53%
1988	4,214	80.02%	1,025	19.46%	27	0.51%
1992	3,776	65.07%	1,515	26.11%	512	8.82%
1996	3,300	68.03%	1,114	22.96%	437	9.01%
2000	4,377	78.60%	1,158	20.79%	34	0.61%
2004	4,657	79.70%	1,158	19.82%	28	0.48%
2008	3,537	75.82%	1,067	22.87%	61	1.31%
2012	3,762	79.27%	936	19.72%	48	1.01%
2016	4,278	85.71%	601	12.04%	112	2.24%
2020	4,628	86.83%	657	12.33%	45	0.84%
2024	4,679	88.15%	576	10.85%	53	1.00%

Located on the overwhelmingly Unionist eastern Pennyroyal, which was too hilly to have large plantations with many slaves, Monroe County was split 50/50 to secession during the Civil War. However, it identified with the GOP after the return of peace and has remained strongly Republican ever since. The last Democrat to carry Monroe County at a Presidential level was George B. McClellan in 1864, and since at least 1896 no Democrat has managed to reach 40 percent of the county's vote. Underlining how Republican the county is, Franklin D. Roosevelt did no better than 38 percent in his four successful bids for president, and actually polled two points lower in 1936 (while winning 46 out of 48 states) than he did in 1932. Lyndon Johnson's 1964 landslide is the last time a Democrat passed 30 percent. The Democrats have managed even 20 percent just five times since Johnson, the last being Barack Obama in 2008.

Since the 1970s, splits among the county's Republicans have led to the election of a few Democrats and independents for local offices. However, there are no elected Democrats above the county level.

The county has produced two members of Congress, Tim Lee Carter and James Comer.

=== Elected officials ===
Elected officials as of January 3, 2025
U.S. House	James Comer (R)	KY 1
Ky. Senate	Max Wise (R)	16
Ky. House	Amy Neighbors (R)	21

== See also ==
- National Register of Historic Places listings in Monroe County, Kentucky
