= Between the Lines (1977 film) =

1977 film by Joan Micklin Silver

- Theatrical release poster by Richard Amsel
- Directed by: Joan Micklin Silver
- Written by: Fred Barron; David M. Helpern Jr.
- Produced by: Raphael D. Silver
- Starring: John Heard; Lindsay Crouse; Jeff Goldblum; Gwen Welles; Bruno Kirby; Stephen Collins; Joe Morton; Marilu Henner; Richard Cox; Michael J. Pollard; Lane Smith; Raymond J. Barry; Guy Boyd; Charles Levin
- Cinematography: Kenneth Van Sickle
- Edited by: John Carter
- Music by: Michael Kamen; Steve Van Zandt
- Production company: Midwest Films
- Distributed by: Midwest Films
- Release dates: March 23, 1977 (USA Film Festival); April 27, 1977
- Running time: 101 minutes
- Country: United States
- Language: English
- Budget: $830,000

Between the Lines is a 1977 American ensemble romantic comedy-drama film from Midwest Films. It was directed by Joan Micklin Silver and produced by her husband Raphael D. Silver. The film was nominated for three awards at the 27th Berlin International Film Festival, winning two of them. For her work as director, Silver was awarded the New Generation Award at the 1977 Los Angeles Film Critics Association Awards.

== Plot ==
The film revolves around a team employed at The Back Bay Mainline, an alternative newspaper in Boston, as they face the threat of a takeover by a major corporation. The key figures in this story include Harry Lucas, a disenchanted lead reporter, talented photographer Abbie, who has an on-and-off again relationship with Harry, Lynn, the kind-hearted and dedicated office administrator, Max, a flaky music critic, Michael, a pretentious writer/author intending to relocate to New York, Laura, a founding reporter on the paper who is living with Michael, David, an eager cub reporter, and Frank, a beleaguered editor-in-chief.

Various subplots unfold throughout the narrative. For instance, Laura grapples with her relationship with self-absorbed Michael, who plans to move to New York using the proceeds from an upcoming book. A party celebration at which Michael repeatedly patronises and ignores her leads to Laura spending the night at Harry's house, before Michael arrives for a confrontation. Ultimately, despite strong reservations, Laura decides to sacrifice her own career and accompany Michael to New York.

David, an inexperienced reporter who commutes on a bike, seeks to prove himself by landing a significant and potentially risky story. A shady record producer whom David pursues for an interview agrees to talk to him, but instead sends two hired goons to meet him and beat him up. Max, Harry, and Abbie attempt to intercept him, arriving just in time to witness David getting a bloody nose.

Harry is drifting in his writing career, becoming disillusioned with journalism and his own ability to create meaningful change in the world. He declares his love to Abbie when they spend a night together, but she rejects him.

Throughout the film, rumors circulate about the newspaper's acquisition by a corporation, specifically a communications empire. Towards the end, it is revealed that a group led by Roy Walsh intends to purchase and manage the paper. In a meeting, Walsh asks Frank to dismiss Harry, branding him a "moving force in the wrong direction." Lynn, the administrator, is the first to resign.

In response to his termination, Harry fantasizes about walking to Walsh's office and shoots him with a suction cup dart toy pistol. In reality, he meets Abbie at a bar. They reconcile and when Max arrives, they leave him there alone. Max cons a stranger into buying him a drink.

== Cast ==
- John Heard as Harry Lucas, disillusioned lead reporter in love with Abbie
- Lindsay Crouse as Abbie, talented photographer, Harry's on/off romantic interest
- Jeff Goldblum as Max Arloft, music critic
- Jill Eikenberry as Lynn, loyal office administrator and idealist
- Bruno Kirby as David Entwhistle, eager cub reporter
- Gwen Welles as Laura, founding reporter and Michael's girlfriend
- Stephen Collins as Michael, arrogant former reporter, wanna-be book author, Laura's boyfriend
- Lewis J. Stadlen as Stanley, priggish advertising manager
- Jon Korkes as Frank, editor
- Michael J. Pollard as The Hawker, news vendor
- Lane Smith as Roy Walsh, corporate operative
- Joe Morton as Ahmed, advertising salesman
- Richard Cox as Stuart Wheeler, publisher
- Marilu Henner as Danielle, stripper/interviewee
- Raymond J. Barry as Herbert Fisk, a conceptual artist
- Gary Springer as Jason
- Susan Haskins as Sarah
- Guy Boyd as Kevin Austin
- Charles Levin as Paul

== Production ==
Fred Barron, who had written for both The Phoenix and The Real Paper, used his and Harper Barnes' alternative newspaper experiences as the basis for his Between the Lines screenplay. Joan Micklin Silver had herself worked for The Village Voice. Doug Kenney, co-founder of the National Lampoon, has a cameo role.

It was largely filmed on location in Boston for two weeks, with locations including pawn shops, record stores, bars, porn theaters, strip clubs, and derelict apartments. The remainder of filming was done in New York City, though no scenes are set in New York.

The film marked the screen debuts of John Heard, Joe Morton, and Marilu Henner. Robert Costanzo makes a brief appearance as a hired goon, his second film role.

The Real Paper, Boston Phoenix, Los Angeles Free Press, SoHo Weekly News, and the Village Voice are thanked in the end credits.

== Release ==
The film premiered at the USA Film Festival in Dallas on March 23, 1977. It opened in New York City on April 27, 1977 at the Sutton Theatre and was due to be released in Boston, Chicago, Los Angeles, San Francisco, and Washington in late April and early May.

== Reception ==
On the review aggregator website Rotten Tomatoes, 94% of 18 critics' reviews are positive, with an average rating of 7.2/10.

The film received positive reviews at the time of its release. Gary Arnold of The Washington Post called it "the most likable and encouraging American movie to be release so far this year."

Over time, the film has come to be regarded as an accurate depiction of the alternative newspaper era. Writing of the film's restoration in 2019, Matthew Monagle of Film School Rejects said:

What makes Between the Lines such a timely film even decades later is its depiction of the diminishing space offered journalism in a world of corporate takeovers. Pages of copy are cut to make way for more advertisements; writers are asked to choose between walking out and compromising their integrity. The film makes it clear that the Back Bay Mainline, even in its diminished capacity, still has its finger on the pulse of the Boston community in a way no major newspaper could. When that is gone, something vital goes with it...

Those looking for the newspaper industry’s answer to Broadcast News will find a welcome film in Between the Lines. The film has countless moments of insight into the struggle of the American journalist, from the staff’s shabby living conditions — the film offers perhaps the most realistic look at big city apartments ever committed to film — to how well-meaning writers navigate the competing interests of truth and financial trendlines. With an all-star cast and some great comedic bits — enjoy watching Goldblum engage in a battle with a local performance artist at the Back Bay Mainline headquarters — Between the Lines is a late addition to the already impressive canon of essential 1970s cinema.

Steve Prokopy of Third Coast Review wrote, "There’s not much by way of story in Between the Lines and a great deal of the dialogue feels spontaneous and improvised, which only adds to the film’s authenticity." The Hollywood Reporter expressed that "the most memorable scenes work better as stand-alone episodes than as part of storylines".

Richard Winters of Scopophilia opined "when the film deals with the relationships there seems to be too much of a feminist bias as the men are always shown to be the ones at fault due to their 'insensitive and selfish natures' while the women come off the ones who are 'reasonable and unfairly neglected'. This could be a product of the fact that it was directed by a woman as well as the era where men were somehow supposed to feel guilty simply because they were men."

In The Guardian, Ryan Gilbey described the film as "a fond but not uncritical portrait of the disaffected staff at a formerly radical, fictional alt-weekly Boston newspaper, from the street-corner hawker all the way up to accounts, editorial and the much-despised incoming corporate boss...Silver’s sympathy for radicalism, and her deft cutting between different pockets of action unfolding in the same space, lent the film an Altmanesque feel."

Margaret Moser of The Austin Chronicle said, "There's no way for us to modestly skirt this film's effect: This story of an underground paper in Boston facing corporate buy-out was the inspiration for starting the newspaper you hold in your hand."

The success of the film led to an unsold 1980 TV sitcom pilot, with Sandy Helberg, Adam Arkin, Gino Conforti, and Kristoffer Tabori, also titled Between the Lines.
