= Timothy McSweeney's Quarterly Concern =

American literary journal

- Issue 15: "The Icelandic Issue" (2004)
- Editor: Rita Bullwinkel
- Former editors: Dave Eggers, Claire Boyle
- Categories: Literary magazine
- Frequency: Quarterly
- Founder: Dave Eggers
- Founded: 1998; 28 years ago
- Company: McSweeney's
- Country: USA
- Based in: San Francisco, California
- Language: English
- Website: www.mcsweeneys.net

Timothy McSweeney's Quarterly Concern, also known simply as McSweeney's, is an American literary journal, founded in 1998, typically containing short stories, reportage, and illustrations. Some issues also include poetry, comic strips, and novellas. The Quarterly Concern is published by McSweeney's based in San Francisco and it has been edited by Dave Eggers. The journal is notable in that it has no fixed format, and changes its publishing style from issue to issue, unlike more conventional journals and magazines.

The first issue featured only works that had been rejected by other publications, but the journal has since begun publishing pieces written with McSweeney's in mind.

== History ==
McSweeney's was founded in 1998 after Dave Eggers left an editing position at Esquire, during the same time he was working on A Heartbreaking Work of Staggering Genius. McSweeney's is a sort of successor to Eggers' earlier magazine project Might, although Might was focused on editorial content and news, and not literature. Eggers also refers to McSweeney's as having "less edge" than Might.

Although originally reaching only a small audience, McSweeney's has grown to be a well respected journal, with Ruth Franklin, writing for Slate, referring to the Quarterly (and company) as "the first bona fide literary movement in decades". In 2013, NPR wrote about the company's fifteenth anniversary, and referred to the journal as the "flagship literary quarterly" of a "literary empire based in San Francisco."

In 2024, Rita Bullwinkel became editor of the journal, succeeding Claire Boyle.

== Authors ==
Notable authors featured in McSweeney's include Denis Johnson, William T. Vollmann, Joyce Carol Oates, Jonathan Lethem, Michael Chabon, Susan Straight, Roddy Doyle, T. Coraghessan Boyle, Steven Millhauser, Robert Coover, Stephen King, David Foster Wallace, Brian Evenson, Tommy Orange, Brandon Hobson, and Ann Beattie. The Quarterly has also helped launch the careers of dozens of emerging writers, including Philipp Meyer, Wells Tower, and Rebecca Curtis.

== Awards ==
In 2007, McSweeney's received the National Magazine Award for Fiction for three stories published in 2006: "Wild Child" by T.C. Boyle (Issue 19); "To Sit, Unmoving" by Susan Steinberg (Issue 20); and "The Strange Career of Dr. Raju Gopalarajan" by Rajesh Parameswaran (Issue 21).

In 2010, Anthony Doerr, Wells Tower, and Kevin Moffett won the National Magazine Awards for their stories "Memory Wall", "Raw Water", and "Further Interpretations of Real-Life Events", respectively, all published in Issue 32.

== Published issues ==
McSweeney's publishes each issue in a different format. Past issues have ranged in format from simple hardcovers or softcovers to more unconventional configurations, such as newspapers, a bundle of mail, a box emblazoned with a man's sweaty head, and a deck of playing cards. Some issues feature writing exclusively or mostly from one geographic area, such as Issue 15, which contained half American and half Icelandic writing.

In Issue 10, it was claimed that exactly 56 issues of the journal would be published. In Issue 20, this claim was repeated in an advertisement that stated: "There will be roughly thirty-six [issues] to come; then, a five-year retrenchment." With the publication of Issue 56 it was revealed that this had always been a joke and that they would continue to publish until at least issue 156.

Issue	Date	Description	Contributors
1	Autumn 1998	"Gegenshein", or "The Ski Instructor" (paperback)	Letters: Ana Marie Cox, John Hodgman, Laura Miller, Tish O'Mara, Glasgow Phillips, Morgan Phillips, William Powers, Don Steinberg, Sarah Vowell, Stuart Wade, Ches Wajda Main contributors: Zev Borow, Arthur Bradford, Randy Cohen, Courtney Eldridge, Mia Fineman, Mary R. Gallagher, Chris Harris, Marc Herman, Tom Junod, Komar and Melamid, Adrienne Miller, Rick Moody, Mark O'Donnell, Christina Pelham-Fence, Morgan Phillips, Neal Pollack, Heidi Pollock, Todd Pruzan, Ted Rall, Marny Requa, Tim Rogers, Phillip Ryan, Steven J. Shalit, Steve Steinberg, Jill Stoddard, Paul Tullis, David Foster Wallace, Jason Zengerle
2	Late Winter, Early Spring 1999	"Timothy McSweeney's Blues/Jazz Odyssey", or "Pollyanna's Bootless Errand" (paperback)	Letters: Shaun Armour, Tim Carvell, Pamela Grim, Brent Hoff, Jon Langford, Jonathan Lethem, Gary Pike, Neal Pollack, Kate Powers Main contributors: Zev Borrow, John Bowe, Arthur Bradford, Paul Collins, Ana Marie Cox, Amanda Davis, Paul DuChateau, Dave Eggers, Mary Gallagher, John Hodgman, Brent Hoff, Heidi Julavits, Brian Kennedy, Lawrence Krauser, Paul Maliszewski, Todd Pruzan, Daniel Radosh, Marny Requa, Tim Rogers, Amy Krouse Rosenthal, David Shields, M. E. Song, Jim Stallard, Sarah Vowell, Colleen Werthmann, Sean Wilsey
3	Late Summer, Early Fall 1999	"Timothy McSweeney's Windfall Republic" (paperback)	Letters: Jason Adams, Arthur Bradford, Dean F. Cully, Jason De Joux, Camden Joy, Jonathan Lethem, Paul Maliszewski, Denise O'Mara, Morgan Phillips, Christopher P. Riley-Zaliniev, Rodney Rothman, David Shields, Sarah Vowell, Colleen Werthmann Main contributors: Steve Amick, Zev Borow, Judy Budnitz, Paul Collins, Ana Marie Cox, Dave Eggers (as Lucy Thomas), Ken Foster, Gary Greenberg, Brian Greene, Kirsten Haas, Jim Hanas, Aleksandar Hemon, Brent Hoff, Cynthia Kaplan, Komar and Melamid, J. Robert Lennon, Dr. Randy Lewis, Magnus Mills, Rick Moody, Christina Nunez, Mark O'Donnell, Tracy Olssen, T. Z. Parsa, A. G. Pasquella, Todd Pruzan, Amy Krouse Rosenthal, Edwin Rozic, Christopher Sorrentino, Saul Steinberg, David Steinhardt, Dr. Jeff Turner, Tom Tomorrow, Dr. Fritz Vollrath, David Foster Wallace, John Warner, E. Weinberger, Lawrence Weschler
4	Late Winter 2000	"Trying, Trying, Trying, Trying, Trying" (box containing 14 booklets and one decorated subscription card)	Letters: Arthur Bradford, Christopher P. Riley-Zaleniev, Sarah Vowell, Sean Wilsey Main contributors: Joshuah Bearman, Rachel Cohen, Paul Collins, Lydia Davis, Marcy Dermansky, Jason Eaton, Steve Featherstone, Amy Fusselman, Ben Greenman, Sheila Heti, Gabe Hudson, Denis Johnson, Nicholas Laughlin, J. Robert Lennon, Jonathan Lethem, Paul Maliszewski, Ben Miller, Rick Moody, Haruki Murakami, David Pacheco, Dan Pope, George Saunders, John Warner, Lawrence Weschler, Ralph Worsey
5	Summer 2000	(hardcover; three different book covers and four different dustjackets)	Letters: Lydia Davis, Courtney Eldridge, Gary Pike, Sarah Vowell Main contributors: Steven Barthelme, Joshuah Bearman, Paul Collins, Ann Cummins, RJ Curtis, Lydia Davis, Kelly Feeney, Ben Greenman, Ted Koppel, Paul LaFarge, J. Robert Lennon, Paul Maliszewski, Ben Marcus, Susan Minot, Jason Ockert, Daniel O'Mara, Alastair Reid, Rodney Rothman, Sarah Vowell, David Foster Wallace (as Elizabeth Klemm), Colleen Werthmann, Lawrence Weschler, Chad Willenborg
6	2001	"Timothy McSweeney's Very Intense Heated Passionate Battle/Embrace with They Might Be Giants" (hardcover; two variants, with different front-cover text: 1) WE NOW KNOW WHO. or 2) FIND THEM AND CONVINCE THEM.; includes CD They Might Be Giants vs. McSweeney's, with tracks to accompany stories and artwork in book); ISBN 978-0-9703355-4-8	Letters: (none) Main contributors: Nathaniel Bellows, Barry Blitt, Arthur Bradford, Katherine Bradford, Breyten Breytenbach, Judy Budnitz, Jeri Coppola, Ann Cummins, Lydia Davis, Marcel Dzama, Richard Erickson, Walker Evans, Matt Fagan, Steve Featherstone, Mia Fineman, Dave Ford, Ian Frazier, Mary Gallagher, Karl Haendel, Saskia Hamilton, Sheila Heti, Samantha Hunt, Candy Jernigan, Roy Kesey, Walter Koenigstein, Mark O'Donnell, Gina O'Mara, Ad Reinhardt, Amy Sillman, Zadie Smith, Fritz Swanson, Chris Ware, Tommy Wallach, John Warner, Lawrence Weschler, Sean Wilsey CD contributors: Arthur Bradford, Ann Cummins, M. Doughty, Free Cooperation, Philip Glass, Roger Greenawalt, Erika Kawalek, Michael Meredith, The Elegant Too (Chris Maxwell, Phil Hernandez), They Might Be Giants (John Flansburgh, John Linnell), S. E. Willis
7	2001	(hardcover case holding nine booklets, all bound by a rubber band); ISBN 978-0-9703355-6-2	Letters: (none) Main contributors: Kevin Brockmeier, Michael Chabon, Steven Connelly, Ann Cummins, Courtney Eldridge, Joan Fry, A. M. Homes, Heidi Julavits, JT LeRoy, Allan Seager, William T. Vollmann, John Warner Cover artists: Melissa Beck, Tim Bower, Elizabeth Kairys, Sharon Leong, Katherine Streeter, Chris Ware, Eric White
8	2002	Guest editor: Paul Maliszewski (hardcover); ISBN 978-0-9719047-1-2	Letters: Amie Barrodale, Karyn Coughlin, Kevin Guilfoile, Mark Honey, J. Robert Lennon, Edna Mayfair, Gary Pike, Lynne Tillman, Steve Timm, James Wagner, Colleen Werthmann, Randall Williams Main contributors: Amie Barrodale, Jonathan Ames, Tina Barney, Joshuah Bearman, Sandow Birk, Janet Bland, Patrick Borelli, Stephan Chapman, Rachel Cohen, Chris Colin, Michel Desommelier, Ben Dryer, Rikki Ducornet, Monique Dufour, Marcel Dzama, Jeff Edmunds, Eric P. Elshtain, Amy England, Jacques Gauthier, Dan Goldstein, Manuel Gonzalez, Aleksandar Hemon, John Hodgman, Carla Howl, Gabe Hudson, Christine Hume, Samantha Hunt, Mike Jerominski, Dewey L. Johnson IV, Catherine Kasper, Erik P. Kraft, Cynthia Kuhn, Paul LaFarge, J. Robert Lennon, Ben Marcus, Jill Marquis, Michael Martone, Whitney Melton, Eugene Mitman, Rick Moody, Robert Nedelkoff, Cedar Pruitt, Christy Ann Rowe, Matt Sauer, Kevin Shay, Joey Skaggs, Gilbert Sorrentino, Brian Spinks, C. Stelzmann, Darin Strauss, Steve Tomasula, David Ray Vance, Bill Wasik, Lawrence Weschler, Curtis White, John Williams, Sean Wilsey Guest cover designer: Elizabeth Kairys
9	Late Summer, Early Fall 2002	"We Feel This One Is More Urgent" (paperback); ISBN 978-0-9719047-5-0	Letters: (none) Main contributors: Isaac Babel, Doug Dorst, Jeff Greenwald, A. M. Homes, Gabe Hudson, Denis Johnson, Roy Kesey, K. Kvashay-Boyle, Nicholas Minton, Ellen Moore, Val Vinokurov, William T. Vollmann
10	2002	"McSweeney's Mammoth Treasury of Thrilling Tales"; Guest editor: Michael Chabon (paperback; pulp magazine style)	Letters: (none) Main contributors: Sherman Alexie, Aimee Bender, Michael Chabon, Dan Chaon, Michael Crichton, Dave Eggers, Harlan Ellison, Carol Emshwiller, Karen Joy Fowler, Neil Gaiman, Glen David Gold, Nick Hornby, Laurie R. King, Stephen King, Elmore Leonard, Kelly Link, Rick Moody, Michael Moorcock, Chris Offutt, Jim Shepard Illustrations: Howard Chaykin Cover art: H. J. Ward
11	2003	"It Can Be Free" (hardcover; issued in four variant faux-leather bindings: black, blue, brown, and yellow/orange; includes DVD); ISBN 978-1-932416-01-5	Letters: Ben Greenman, Trevor Koski, M, Dow Mossman, Emilio Oliveira, Benjamin Rosenbaum, Jeffrey Rotter Main contributors: Daphne Beal, Tom Bissell, Kit Bolstad, T. Coraghessan Boyle, Doug Dorst, Stephen Elliott, Brent Hoff, Samantha Hunt, Denis Johnson, Benjamin Lytal, David Means, Joyce Carol Oates, Robert Olmstead, Dr. Steve O'Shea, A. G. Pasaquella, Alison Smith, Sean Warren, Lawrence Welscher DVD only: Jonathan Ames, Marcel Dzama, Neal Farber, John Hodgman, Sarah Vowell
12	2003	"Unpublished, Unknown, &/or Unbelievable" (paperback; divided into four colored sections; cover flaps can be unfolded to view 3D illusion inside); ISBN 978-1-932416-06-0	Letters: Ryan W. Bradley, Jeffrey Brand, David Dineen-Porter, Stephen Elliott, Eli Horowitz, Gabe Hudson, Sarah Manguso, Anna Pervukhin Main contributors: Steve Almond, Aimee Bender, Jill Bialosky, James Boice, Ryan Boudinot, Judy Budnitz, Douglas Coupland, Ann Cummins, Andrea Deszo, Roddy Doyle, David Ebershoff, Jennifer Egan, Ben Ehrenreich, Alicia Erian, John Henry Fleming, Emma Forrest, Glen David Gold, Myla Goldberg, Aleksandar Hemon, Gabe Hudson, Laird Hunt, Jessica Francis Kane, Steve Korver, Andy Lamey, J. Robert Lennon, Jonathan Lethem, Wythe Marschall, Rhett Miller, Rick Moody, Mark Nesbitt, Rene Nuijens, Peter Orner, Julie Orringer, Salvador Plascencia, Shann Ray, Sarah Raymont, Stacey Richter, Katie Roiphe, Rachel Sherman, Chad Simpson, Steve Stiefel, Darin Strauss, Valerie Sutton, Dean Wareham, Ashley Warlick Cover art: Christian Northeast
13	Spring 2004	"An Assorted Sampler of North American Comic Drawings, Strips, and Illustrated Stories, &c." Guest editor: Chris Ware (hardcover; dustjacket unfolds into two large artworks; includes two mini-comics); ISBN 978-1-932416-08-4	Letters: (none) Main contributors: Lynda Barry, Mark Beyer, Chester Brown, Jeffrey Brown, Ivan Brunetti, Charles Burns, Michael Chabon (as Malachi B. Cohen), Daniel Clowes, David Collier, R. Crumb, Kim Deitch, Julie Doucet, Debbie Drechsler, H. C. "Bud" Fisher, Ira Glass, Glen David Gold, Milt Gross, David Heatley, Gilbert Hernandez, Jaime Hernandez, Ben Katchor, Kaz, Chip Kidd, Joe Matt, Richard McGuire, John McLenan, Mark Newgarden, Gary Panter, John Porcellino, Archer Prewitt, Ronald J. Rege Jr., Joe Sacco, Richard Sala, Tim Samuelson, Seth, Art Spiegelman, Adrian Tomine, Rodolphe Töpffer, John Updike, Chris Ware, Jim Woodring Dustjacket art: Chris Ware
14	Early Fall 2004	"Timothy McSweeney's at War for the Foreseeable (Shitbrained) Future and He's Never Been So Scared" (paperback ISBN 978-1-932416-12-1	Letters: Jonathan Ames, Charlie, Brent Hoff, Nick Hornby, Laura Jensen, Timothy McSweeney, A. G. Pasquella, Simon, Sarah Vowell Main contributors: Chris Adrian, Jessica Anthony, Chris Bachelder, Joshuah Bearman, Ryan Boudinot, T. Coraghessan Boyle, Kate Braverman, Robert Olen Butler, Lindsay Carleton, Silvia DiPierdomenico, Pia Z. Ehrhardt, Denis Johnson, Jessica Lamb-Shapiro, Claire Light, Malinda McCollum, Jim Shepard, Susan Straight, Wells Tower, Lawrence Weschler
15	Winter 2005	"The Icelandic Issue" (hardcover; includes Icelandic tabloid mini-magazine); ISBN 978-1-932416-14-5	Letters: (none) Main contributors: Guðbergur Bergsson, Birna Anna Björnsdóttir, Kiara Brinkman, Judy Budnitz, Jimmy Chen, Roddy Doyle, Þórarinn Eldjárn, Gyrðir Elíasson, Seth Fried, Einar Már Guðmundsson, Eric Hanson, Silja Hauksdóttir, Hallgrímur Helgason, Roy Kesey, Andri Snœr Magnason, Steven Millhauser, Bragi Ólafsson, Padgett Powell, Benjamin Rosenbaum, Sjón, Oddný Sturludóttir Cover art: Leif Parsons
16	Summer 2005	(hardcover packaging; includes quarterly, novella, deck-of-cards story, and a Timothy-embossed plastic comb); ISBN 978-1-932416-15-2	Letters: (none) Main contributors: Ann Beattie, Robert Coover, Roddy Doyle, Pia Z. Ehrhardt, Brian Evenson, Denis Johnson, Adam Levin, Harry Mathews, Miranda Mellis, Nathaniel Minton, Kevin Moffett, Hannah Pittard Card backs: Michael Kupperman Beattie cover art: George Slavik Case art: Joanna Davis
17	October/ November 2005	"Made to Look Like It Came in Your Mailbox" (packaged as a bundle of mail; includes letters, magazines titled Yeti Researcher and Unfamiliar, sausage catalog, circular for Pantalaine "plural clothing", and Envelope, containing reproductions of "new artwork"); ISBN 978-1-932416-31-2	Letters: (Yeti Researcher) Joshua Rivkin, Kaarl Mustanen Contributing writers: Joshuah Bearman, Erich Bluhm, Judy Budnitz, Rebecca Curtis, Trinie Dalton, Evan Derkacz, Stephen Elliott, Peter Ferry, Avital Gad-Cykman, Bryan Gardiner, Jon Alain Guzik, Eric Hanson, John Haskell, Brent Hoff, Gabe Hudson, Ronni Kapos, Starlee Kine, Kenneth Koch, Sarah Manguso, Laurenn McCubbin, Greg Moore, Kirby Olson, Jim Ruland, Jim Shepard, J. Silver, Mark Sundeen, Katie Wudel Envelope: David Byrne, Georgeanne Deen, Camille Rose Garcia, Salomon Huerta, Steve Klamm, Jasiu Krajewski, David Mamet, Tucker Nichols, Manuel Ocampo, Clare Rojas, Mark Ryden, Jaime Scholnick Pantalaine: Brian McMullen
18	Winter 2005/2006	(paperback; packaged with Wholphin DVD magazine, Issue #1); ISBN 978-1-932416-38-1	Letters: (none) Contributing writers: Alan Ackman, Chris Adrian, Roddy Doyle, Rachel Haley Himmelhaber, Adam Levin, Joe Meno, Philipp Meyer, Yannick Murphy, Joyce Carol Oates, Daniel Orozco, Nelly Reifler, Deb Olin Unferth, Lawrence Weschler, Edmund White Maze specialist: Jason Shiga
19	Spring 2006	"Old Facts, New Fiction, & a Novella by T.C. Boyle" (cigar box containing quarterly and 15 reproductions of government publications, political propaganda, photographs, and other ephemera); ISBN 978-1-932416-48-0	Letters: (none) Contributing writers: T. Coraghessan Boyle, Sean Casey, Brendan Connell, Adam Golaski, Christopher Howard Cigar box art: Michael Kupperman
20	Summer 2006	(hardcover; every fourth page is a full-color illustration; includes a booklet, attached inside the back cover, containing the first part of The Children's Hospital, a novel by Chris Adrian); ISBN 978-1-932416-52-7	Letters: (none) Contributing writers: Tony D'Souza, Aaron Gwynn, Ben Jahn, Roy Kesey, Sam Miller, Kevin Moffett, Jack Pendarvis, Sarah Raymont, Anthony Schneider, Susan Steinberg, J. Erin Sweeney, Corinna Vallianatos, Rod White Contributing artists: Franz Ackermann, Mamma Andersson, Kevin Christy, Anna Conway, Holly Coulis, Amy Cutler, Jules de Balincourt, Chris Duncan, Echo Eggebrecht, Niklas Eneblom, Jeff Gauntt, Angelina Gualdoni, Ernst Haeckel, Wendy Heldmann, Jason Holley, Håvard Homstvedt, Susan Logoreci, Ashley Macomber, Jacob Magraw-Mickelson, Jodie Mohr, Laura Owens, Clare Rojas, Henri Rousseau, Rachel Salomon, Andrew Schoultz, Keith Andrew Shore, Rachell Sumpter, Fred Tomaselli, Kuniyoshi Utagawa Cover art: Jacob Magraw-Mickelson
21	Fall 2006	(paperback; fully illustrated cover, with a small flap on the front that unfolds to create a continuous picture around all four sides; eight variant covers); ISBN 978-1-932416-61-9	Letters: (none) Contributing writers: Greg Ames, Arthur Bradford, Roddy Doyle, Stephen Elliott, Chloe Hooper, Miranda July, Kevin Moffett, Yannick Murphy, Joyce Carol Oates, Peter Orner, Rajesh Parameswaran, Holly Tavel, A. Nathan West, Christian Winn Contributing artists: Nate Beaty, Robert Goodin, Leif Parsons, Matt Rota Cover art: Keith Jones
22	2007	"Three Books Held Within By Magnets" (faux-leather hardcover case with a magnet bound into the spine, holding three paperbacks with metal strips bound into their spines); ISBN 978-1-932416-66-4	Letters: (none) Contributors to Book 1, "From the Notebook: The Unwritten Stories of F. Scott Fitzgerald": Stephany Aulenback, John Beckman, Marc Bojanowski, Judy Budnitz, Ian Caldwell, Rachel Ingalls, Sam Lipsyte, Tom Lombardi, Carey Mercer, Lydia Millet, Sigrid Nunez, Michelle Orange, Salvador Plascencia, Matthew Sharpe, Miriam Toews, Jincy Willett, Diane Williams Contributors to Book 2, "The State of Constraint: New Work by Oulipo": Marcel Bénabou, François Caradec, Lynn Crawford, Frédéric Forte, Paul Fournel, Anne F. Garréta, Michelle Grangaud, Jacques Jouet, Hervé Le Tellier, Harry Mathews, Ian Monk, Jacques Roubaud, Olivier Salon Contributors to Book 3, "The Poetry Chains of Dominic Luxford: Ten Poets Pick Ten More and So On": Elizabeth Alexander, Ralph Angel, John Ashbery, Caroline Bergvall, David Berman, Michael Burkard, Tina Chang, Olena Kaiytiak Davis, Mark Doty, Lynn Emanuel, Ángel Garcia, Forrest Hamer, francine j. harris, Terrance Hayes, Brenda Hillman, Jane Hirshfield, Denis Johnson, A. Van Jordan, Thomas Kane, Mary Karr, Ruth Ellen Kocher, Yusef Komunyakaa, Gerry LaFemina, Patrick Lawler, Sarah Lindsay, Harryette Mullen, Alice Notley, Michael Ondaatje, Linda Tomol Pennisi, Heidi Johannesen Poon, Courtney Queeney, Brett Eugene Ralph, Atsuro Riley, Lisa Robertson, Pattiann Rogers, Mary Ruefle, Kay Ryan, Tomaž Šalamun, Kaia Sand, Bernd Sauerman, Brenda Shaughnessy, Charles Simic, Tracy K. Smith, Brandon Som, Mary Stebbins, Larissa Szporluk, James Tate, Rodrigo Toscano, C. D. Wright, Dean Young
23	Spring 2007	"Still Going Strong / Like Castro (We Meant Ramón)" (hardcover; dustjacket unfolds, with an illustration by Andrea Dezsö on one side, and, on the other, several short-short stories and nearly 200 drawings—presented in a volvelle-like circular array—by Dave Eggers; "Comedy by the Numbers" booklet attached inside back cover) ISBN 978-1-932416-76-3	Letters: (none) Contributing writers: Chris Bachelder, Ann Beattie, Caren Beilin, Roddy Doyle, Dave Eggers, Clancy Martin, Deb Olin Unferth, Chris Stokes, Wells Tower, Shawn Vestal, April Wilder Dustjacket (exterior) art and interior illustrations: Andrea Dezsö Dustjacket (interior) design: Dave Eggers and Brian McMullen
24	Fall 2007	"Trouble" and "Come Back, Donald Barthelme" (hardcover; the two parts are bound dos-à-dos; includes a booklet, attached to the verso of the front free endpaper of "Trouble", containing the first part of Bowl of Cherries, a novel by Millard Kaufman); ISBN 978-1-932416-77-0	Letters: (none) Contributing writers: "Trouble": Jonathan Ames, Aaron Gwyn, Eric Hanson, Christopher R. Howard, Joe Meno, Philippe Soupault, Robin Walz (translator of the Soupault story) "Come Back, Donald Barthelme": Donald Barthelme, Justin Taylor, Ann Beattie, Cliff Chase, Robert Coover, Tracy Daugherty, David Gates, Kim Herzinger, Oscar Hijuelos, Edward Hirsch, Brian Kiteley, Gary Lutz, Mark Jay Mirsky, Lance Olsen, Grace Paley, Padgett Powell, George Saunders, Michael Silverblatt, Tom Steele, Brian Kim Stefans, Frederic Tuten, Lawrence Weschler, Lois Parkinson Zamora Cover art: Rachell Sumpter
25	Fall/Winter 2007	(hardcover); ISBN 978-1-932416-84-8	Letters: (none) Contributing writers: Emily Anderson, Kenneth Bonert, David Hollander, Chloe Hooper, Connor Kilpatrick, Alexander MacBride, Steven Millhauser, Joyce Carol Oates, Padgett Powell, Terry Wright Cover illustration: Leah Hayes Interior illustrations: Amy Jean Porter
26	Winter/Spring 2008	"New Stories from Overseas", "New Stories from Our Shores", and "Where to Invade Next" (three volumes: the two "New Stories" volumes are small oblong paperbacks; the third volume is hardcover); ISBN 978-1-932416-88-6	Letters: (none) Contributing writers: "New Stories from Overseas": Uzodinma Iweala, Frank Lentricchia, Dana Mazur, Garry Craig Powell, Ismet Prcic, Rob Sears, Stephen Smith "New Stories from Our Shores": John Brandon, Amanda Davis, Wayne Harrison, Michael Gills, Uzodinma Iweala, Ismet Prcic "Where to Invade Next": Stephen Elliott (editor), Andrew F. Altschul, Greg Larson, Eric Martin, Jesse Nathan, Peter Rednour, Jason Roberts
27	Spring 2008	(paperback; three volumes in illustrated card slipcase: the journal, Autophobia by Art Spiegelman, and Lots of Things Like This, an exhibition catalog); ISBN 978-1-932416-91-6	Letters: (none) Contributing writers: Ashlee Adams, Dave Eggers (introduction to Lots of Things Like This), Mikel Jollett, Stephen King, Liz Mandrell, Jim Shepard, Larry Smith, Art Spiegelman Slipcase photograph: Irving Underhill (1921) Cover illustration: Scott Teplin (journal), Art Spiegelman (Autophobia) Interior illustrations: Scott Teplin (journal)
28	Summer 2008	(hardcover; eight volumes housed in a board tray and held in place by elastic bands; the volumes, with illustrated back covers, are arranged in two sets of four, with each set combining to form a larger illustration; introduction by Jess Benjamin is printed inside the tray); ISBN 978-1-934781-07-4	Letters: (none) Contributing writers (and interior illustrators): Daniel Alarcón (Jordan Awan), Ryan Boudinot (Genevieve Simms), Arthur Bradford (Jon Adams), Nathan Englander (Jordin Isip), Brian Evenson (Phillip Fivel Nessen), Sheila Heti (Liz Lee), Tayari Jones (Morgan Elliott), Sarah Manguso (Louie Cordero) Cover illustrations: Danica Novgorodoff
29	Fall/Winter 2008	(hardcover; three variant bindings (die-cut blue cloth over black cloth, gray over black, and black over red); illustrated throughout with color reproductions of matchbook covers, "most of them Eastern European in origin," collected by Jane McDevitt); ISBN 978-1-934781-08-1	Letters: (none) Contributing writers: Brian Baise, Roddy Doyle, Blaze Ginsberg, Ben Greenman, Laura Hendrix, Erica Plouffe Lazure, Nathaniel Minton, Yannick Murphy, Joyce Carol Oates, Peter Orner, Nelly Reifler, Dawn Ryan, J. Erin Sweeney, John Thorson
30	Winter 2008/09	"¡Rejoice!", or "Forge-Ahead/Throwback Issue" (paperback; design similar to issues 1–3); ISBN 978-1-934781-22-7	Letters: (none) Contributing writers: Catherine Bussinger, Michael Cera, Bill Cotter, Nick Ekkizogloy, J. Malcolm Garcia, Etgar Keret, Carson Mell, Kevin Moffett, Shelly Oria, Wells Tower, Matei Visniec (translated by Shari Gerstenberger) Interior illustrations: Jason Polan
31	Summer 2009	"Vikings, Monks, Philosophers, Whores: Old Forms, Unearthed"; Curated by Darren Franich and Graham Weatherly (hardcover; "McSweeney's Summertime Sampler", a 16-page tabloid-sized publication containing excerpts from three current or forthcoming books from McSweeney's, attached inside back cover); ISBN 978-1-934781-34-0	Letters: (none) Contributing writers: anonymous/unknown, Nicky Beer, John Brandon, Joel Brouwer, Duan Chengshi, Nicolas Chorier, Douglas Coupland, Jennifer Michael Hecht, Shelley Jackson, Ben Jahn, Troy Jollimore, Dan Liebert, Byron Lu, George Barr McCutcheon, Mary Miller, Douglas W. Milliken, Walker Pfost, Plato, Will Sheff, Chris Spurr, Bill Tarlin, David Thomson, Tony Trigilio, Miguel de Unamuno, Joy Williams Cover illustration: Scott Teplin McSweeney's Summertime Sampler: Jessica Anthony, Bill Cotter, James Hannaham, Jayme Yen (design)
32	Fall 2009	"2024 AD" (hardcover); ISBN 978-1-934781-35-7	Letters: (none) Contributing writers: Chris Adrian, Chris Bachelder, Anthony Doerr, Sesshu Foster, Sheila Heti, Heidi Julavits, Salvador Plascencia, Jim Shepard, J. Erin Sweeney, Wells Tower Cover and endpaper illustration: Robyn O'Neil Interior illustrations: Michael Schall
33	Winter 2009/10	"San Francisco Panorama" (newspaper; includes explanatory insert, poster, "Rocket Sam" cut out sheet, and two magazines: The Panorama Magazine and The Panorama Book Review); ISBN 978-1-934781-48-7	Contributors Contributing writers: Newspaper: Tsan Abrahamson, Charon Asetoyer, Nicholson Baker, Tom Barbash, Christopher Benz, Anna Brenner, Lisa Brown, Faye Browne, Brandon Bussolini, Crystal Carter, Kevin Collier, Patricia Decker, Matthew Derby, Katrina Dodson, Stephen Elliott, Ryan Farr, FreeDarko Collective, Albino Garcia, J. Malcolm Garcia, Yana Garcia, Aidan Gardiner, Tom Goldtooth, PennElys GoodShield, Moze Halperin, Lisa M. Hamilton, Daniel Handler, Reyhan Harmanci, Tim Heidecker, Chinaka Hodge, Brent Hoff, Jessica Hopper, John Horgan, Rachel Khong, Stephen King, Winona LaDuke, Andrew Leland, L. E. Leone, Joe Loya, Paolo Luchessi, Amy Martin, Theodore McDermott, China Miéville, John Mooallem, Sarah Morrison, Eddie Muller, Jesse Nathan, Don Novello, Richard Parks, Michaelanne and Angela Petrella, Roger Pimentel, Peter Plate, Robert Porterfield, Brendan Emmett Quigley, Tom Reed, Irma Rodriguez, Salman Rushdie, Chris Sheehy, Ross Simonini, Zac Stone, Brandon Stosuy, Benjamin Tausig, Michelle Tea, Jeremy Teppas, Kendra Terry, Colin Thomas-Jensen, Nick Tilsen, Wendy Todd, Gustavo Turner, William T. Vollman, Douglas Wolk, Chris Ying Magazine: Wajahat Ali, Christopher Benz, Tom Bissell, Zev Borow, Michael Chabon, David Fenkel, Andrew Sean Greer, Marshall Hayes, Brent Hoff, Chip Kidd, Scott Kirsner, Matthew Klam, Jonah Lehrer, Gideon Lewis-Kraus, Juliet Linderman, Tom Luddy, Timothy Parker, Peter Sollett, Mary Williams Book Review: Chimamanda Ngozi Adichie, Chris Adrian, Samuel Garang Akau, Daniel Alarcón, Rae Armantrout, John Ashbery, Joshuah Bearman, Stephen Burt, Katie Crouch, Junot Díaz, Matthew Dickman, Anthony Doerr, Roddy Doyle, Firoozah Dumas, Jessica Fisher, James Franco, Seth Fried, Beverly Gage, Jeff Gundy, Matthea Harvey, Robert Hass, Brenda Hillman, Jane Hirshfield, H. L. Hix, Ben Jahn, Jean Janzen, Troy Jollimore, Miranda July, Ilya Kaminsky, Julia Kinsman, Juliet Litman, Alia Malek, Lisa Morehouse, Paul Muldoon, Dicky Murphy, Geoff Nicholson, Peter Orner, Keith Ratzlaff, George Saunders, Deb Olin Unferth, Sean Wilsey, Matthew Zapruder Contributing illustrators: Newspaper: Aron Bothman, Susan Kelk Cervantes, Emily Eibel, Laura Foxgrover, Eric Heiman, Ian Huebert, Lauren LoPrete, Nancy Smith, Jackson Solway (photo), James Stokoe, David Thomson, Shihwen Wang, Chris Ware Comics section: Jessica Abel, Jon Adams, Mac Barnett, Alison Bechdel, Gabrielle Bell, Heather Brinesh, Ivan Brunetti, Michael Capozzola, Daniel Clowes, Kim Deitch, Ian Huebert, Keith Knight, Erik Larsen, Katrina Ortiz, Adam Rex, Seth, Art Spiegelman, Adrian Tomine, Chris Ware, Gene Luen Yang Magazine: Amelia Bauer (cover), Domitille Collardey, Eric Drooker, Toufic El Rassi Book Review: Mark Todd (cover), Wesley Allsbrook, Melissa Beck, Guy Billout, Louie Cordero, Brad Farwell (photo), Katherine Guillen, Lisa Hanawalt, Michael Kupperman, Jesse Lefkowitz, Matt Rota, Leigh Wells
34	Spring 2010	(two paperbacks in plastic sleeve: the journal and The End of Major Combat Operations by Nick McDonell); ISBN 978-1-934781-67-8	Letters: Arthur Bradford, Eric Calderwood, Tim Carvell, Julio Villanueva Chang, Brian T. Edwards, John Hodgman, Julie Klausner, Sodienye Kurubo, Andrew Leland, David Shields, Sarah Vowell Contributing writers: Mona Awad, Tom Barbash, T. Coraghessan Boyle, Sean Casey, Bridget Clerkin, Lawrence-Minh Bùi Davis, Anthony Doerr, Daniel Handler, Annie Holmes, David Means, Peter Orner Cover illustration: Siri Hustvedt Interior illustrations: (self-portraits; introduction by Brian McMullen) Joey Lauren Adams, Jonathan Ames, Ramin Bahrani, Lisa Brown, Seymour Chwast, Stephen Elliott, Brian Evenson (back page), Michel Gondry, Rashida Jones, Nicole Holofcener, Arsinée Khanjian, Jon Langford, Mike Leigh, Jonathan Lethem, Ben Marcus, Greil Marcus, Michael Martone, Jack Pendarvis, Davy Rothbart, Sarah Silverman
35	Summer 2010	(paperback; a section of the journal is devoted to "a portfolio of stories from Norway"; preview booklet for the novel Citrus County by John Brandon inside back cover flap); ISBN 978-1-934781-72-2	Letters: Brian Beatty, Benjamin Cohen, Ben Greenman, Ellie Kemper, Dan Kennedy, Pasha Malla, Mike Sacks, Leon Sanders, Jim Stallard, Sarah Walker, Teddy Wayne, Kent Woodyard Contributing writers: Hilton Als, Patrick Crerand, Roddy Doyle, Steven Millhauser Stories from Norway: Mikkel Bugge (editor), John Erik Riley (editor) (translations by Riley, Liv Irene Myrhe, May-Brit Akerholt, and Kari Dickson) Ingvar Ambjørnsen, Frode Grytten, Johan Harstad, Hans Herbjørnsrud, Roy Jacobsen, Gunnhild Øyehaug, Per Pettersen, Laila Stien, Tor Ulven Flamme Forlag section: Nils-Øivind Haagensen (editor), Bendik Wold (editor), Ole-Petter Arneberg, Victoria Durnak, Audun Mortensen, Rannveig Revhaug Contributing artist: Robert Barnes Cover illustration: Jordan Crane
36	Winter 2010/11	"Timothy McSweeney's Thirty-sixth Issue" (illustrated "head" box containing journal, eight other booklets, four postcards, uncut roll of fortune-cookie fortunes, insert card, and cardboard spacer); ISBN 978-1-934781-74-6	Letters: Christopher Benz, Steve Delahoyde, Jesse Eisenberg, Marco Kaye, L. E. Leone, Gideon Lewis-Kraus, Mary Miller, Davy Rothbart, Aulden Timmer Contributing writers: Wajahat Ali, Andrew Kennedy Hutchison Boyd, John Brandon, Michael Chabon, Paul Collins, Sophia Cara Frydman, Tim Heidecker, Maggie Lemere, Adam Levin, Ricardo Nuila, Jack Pendarvis (writing as L. P. Eaves), Ismet Prcic, Ishmael Reed, Colm Tóibín, Gregg Turkington, Zoë West Contributing illustrators: Sophia Cara Frydman (Frydman), Ian Huebert (postcards), Daniel Krall (Ali cover), Léon Krier (Chabon), Michael Kupperman (Eaves), Connie Sun (Ali interior) Box illustration: Matt Furie
37	Spring 2011	(hardcover; perspective cover illustration and format, with truncated corners at the spine top and fore-edge bottom, giving the appearance of a book seen from an angle; a section of the journal is devoted to "five new stories from Kenya"; preview booklet containing four chapters from A Moment in the Sun by John Sayles in a pocket affixed to the front pastedown endpaper; vertical wraparound band on back cover); ISBN 978-1-934781-86-9	Letters: Jamie Allen, Steve Delahoyde, James Fleming, Hallie Haglund, Jamie Quatro, Brendan Emmett Quigley, Christopher Monks, Laraine Newman, Mike Sacks, Ted Travelstead, Christopher Turner Contributing writers: Jonathan Franzen, J. Malcolm Garcia, John Hyduk, Etgar Keret, Edan Lepucki, Joe Meno, Kevin Moffett, Joyce Carol Oates, Nelly Reifler, Jess Walter Stories from Kenya: Binyavanga Wainaina (editor and story), Keguro Macharia (editor), Billy Kahora, Annette Lutivini Majanja, Richard Onyango (story and paintings), Yvonne Adhiambo Owuor Cover and interior paintings: Jonathan Runcio Border art: Sophia Cara Frydman, Henry James
38	Summer/Fall 2011	(cloth-covered card softcover, issued in three color variants (red, green, gold); Jack Teagle's short comic "The Jungle" included as a bound-in insert); ISBN 978-1-936365-00-5	Letters: Paul Curtis, Deejay, Rory Douglas, David Henne, Joey Latimer, Peter Meehan, John Moe, Peter Orner, Jason Polan, Sloan Schang, Jen Statsky, Jon Wurster Contributing writers: Bisi Adjapon, Ariel Dorfman, Roddy Doyle, Dave Eggers, Rachel B. Glaser, Dan Guterman, Adam Levin, Alia Malik, Steven Millhauser, Nathaniel Rich, Jack Teagle, Chanan Tigay Cover and spine illustration: Jessica Hische
39	Fall/Winter 2011	(hardcover); ISBN 978-1-936365-10-4	Letters: Benjamin Cohen, David-Ivar Herman Düne, Stephen Elliott, Marco Kaye, Avery Lee, Dickey Murphy, Elizabeth Sankey Contributing writers: Tom Barbash, J. T. K. Belle, Roberto Bolaño, Amelia Gray, Václav Havel, Julie Hecht, Elmore Leonard, Abi Maxwell, Yannick Murphy, E. C. Osondu, Jennie Erin Smith, Jess Walter, Benjamin Weissman Cover photo and photographic inserts: Tabitha Soren
40	Spring 2012	(softcover journal, with Jason Jägel's illustrated booklet "Well Come Home" included as a bound-in insert, and hardcover book In My Home There Is No More Sorrow by Rick Bass, with paperboard cutout wraparound band); ISBN 978-1-936365-35-7	Letters: Jesse Adelman, Amy Fusselman, Simon De Ferry, Daniel Galera, Calvin Godfrey, Andrew Golden, Tom O'Donnell, Jack Pendarvis, Simon Rich, Rob Sears Contributing writers: Neil Gaiman, Etgar Keret, Adam Levin, Nathan C. Martin, Kevin Moffett, Saïd Sayrafiezadeh, David Vann Egyptian Revolution special section: Noor Elashi (compiler), Daniel Gumbiner (compiler), Hany Adel, Alaa El Aswany, Tamim al-Bargouti, Sarah Carr, Amir Eid, Bilal Fadl, Alaa Abd El-Fattah, Adel Iskandar, Asmaa Mahfouz, Hosni Mubarak, Ahmad Fouad Negm, Youssef Rakha, Gene Sharp Cover illustration: Jason Jägel (journal), Lowry Bass (book cover photo)
41	Fall/Winter 2012	(hardcover); ISBN 978-1-936365-60-9	Letters: Cirocco Dunlap, John Flowers, David Lida, Jason Polan, Susan Straight Contributing writers: Henry Bean, Aimee Bender, Ryan Boudinot, John Brandon, Sibylla Brodzinsky, J. Malcolm Garcia, Jowhor Ile, Thomas McGuane, Viveca Mellegard, Steven Millhauser, Max Shoening, Deb Olin Unferth, Jess Walter Terra Australis: Four Stories from Australian Aboriginal Writers: Chris Flynn (introduction), Tony Birch, Melissa Lucashenko, Ellen van Nerveen-Curry, Tara June Winch Cover and endpapers: Cassandra C. Jones
42	Winter 2013	"Multiples" or Twelve Stories Appearing in up to Six Versions Each; Guest editor: Adam Thirlwell (oblong softcover with a two-layer stepped partial cover); ISBN 978-1-936365-77-7	Letters: none Contributing writers: Originals: Carlo Emilio Gadda, Youssef Habchi El-Achkar, Franz Kafka, Søren Kierkegaard, Danilo Kiš, László Krasznahorkai, Richard Middleton, Kenji Miyazawa, Giuseppe Pontiggia, A. L. Snijders, Enrique Vila-Matas Translations: Nadeem Aslam, Tash Aw, John Banville, Frédéric Beigbeder, Laurent Binet, A. S. Byatt, Orly Castel-Bloom, J. M. Coetzee, Lydia Davis, Joe Dunthorne, Dave Eggers, Nathan Englander, Álvaro Enrigue, Péter Esterházy, Jeffrey Eugenides, Adam Foulds, Julia Franck, Rodrigo Fresán, Tristan Garcia, Francisco Goldman, Andrew Sean Greer, Arnon Grunberg, Yannick Haenel, Rawi Hage, Aleksandar Hemon, Sheila Heti, Chloe Hooper, Heidi Julavits, Daniel Kehlmann, Etgar Keret, Jonas Hassen Khemiri, László Krasznahorkai, Jonathan Lethem, Mara Faye Lethem, Valeria Luiselli, Ma Jian, Sarah Manguso, Javier Marías, Clancy Martin, Wyatt Mason, Tom McCarthy, David Mitchell, Cees Nooteboom, Lawrence Norfolk, Julie Orringer, Francisco Pacifico, Alan Pauls, José Luís Peixoto, Gary Shteyngart, Sjón, Zadie Smith, Peter Stamm, Adam Thirlwell, Colm Tóibín, Camille de Toledo, Jean-Christophe Valtat, Vendela Vida, Ivan Vladislavić, John Wray, Alejandro Zambra, Florian Zeller Illustrations: Wesley Allsbrook, Erin Althea, Mike Bertino, Brianna Harden, Ian Huebert, Tim Lahan Cover illustrations: Wesley Allsbrook, Erin Althea, Mike Bertino, Kelsey Dake, Ian Huebert
43	Spring 2013	(softcover journal and softcover book of fiction from South Sudan, each with a folding three-panel cutout front cover); ISBN 978-1-938073-20-5	Letters: Doogie Horner, Nathan C. Martin, Avery Monsen, Theo Nguyen, Patrick Shaffner, Rachel Sommerville Contributing writers: Charles Baxter, T. C. Boyle, Noor Elashi, Catherine Lacey, Ludmilla Petrushevskaya, William Wheeler There Is a Country: New Fiction from the New Nation of South Sudan: Nyuol Lueth Tong (editor and contributor), Samuel Garang Akau, Arif Gamal, Taban Lo Liyong, Victor Lugala, Edward Eremugo Luka, David L. Lukudu, John Oryem Covers: Gregory Euclide Interior illustrations: Gregory Euclide (journal), Sunra Thompson (South Sudan anthology)
44	Fall/Winter 2013	(Hardcover journal); ISBN 978-1938073458	Letters: Jessica Hopper, Stuart Glover, Simon Rich, Rob Curran, Jenny Shank, Andrew Palmer, and Mike Sacks Contributing writers: Rebecca Curtis, Joe Meno, Jim Shepard, Stuart Dybek, Wells Tower, Tom Barbash
45	Winter 2013	Hitchcock and Bradbury Fistfight in Heaven (Hardcover journal); ISBN 978-1938073632	This edition features stories republished from magazines managed by Ray Bradbury and Alfred Hitchcock.
46	Spring 2014	Thirteen Crime Stories from Latin America (Hardcover journal); ISBN 978-1938073854	This edition features stories by authors from Latin America, all dealing in some way with crime.
47	Fall 2014	(Hardcover sleeve with ten portable booklets); ISBN 9781938073861	Letters: Jason D. Polan, Alex Ryan Bauer, Kathryn Davis, Ben Greenman, and José Luís Peixoto
48	Spring 2015	Sixteen new stories and a full-length screenplay (Hardcover, two volumes)	Letters: Gary Rudoren, Dan Keane, Katherine Heiny, Colin Winnette, Rachel B. Glaser, Keaton Patti, David Gumbiner, Sonny Smith, and Matt Sumell.
49	Spring 2017	Cover Stories, in which well-known short stories and poems are reimagined in a manner similar to a musician covering another's song ISBN 9781940450094	Letters: Wajahat Ali, Nick Jaina, Robin Terrell, Kimberly Harrington, Mary Miller, Rick Moody, Will Butler, and Ariel S. Winter
50	Summer 2017	Hardcover book featuring the work of 50 authors ISBN 9781940450100
51	Winter 2017/18	ISBN 9781944211448	Letters: Patty Yumi Cottrell, Amy Berkowitz, Ali Liebegott, Lawrence Weschler, José Vadi, Niela Orr, Claire Vaye Watkins, and Rajeev Balasubramanyam
52	Spring 2018	In Their Faces A Landmark: Stories of Movement and Displacement, a collection of migrant literature guest-edited by Nyuol Lueth Tong; ISBN 9781944211578
53	Summer 2018	Includes eight balloons with stories printed on them, which must be blown up to read ISBN 9781944211585	Letters: Scaachi Koul, Daniel Gumbiner, Rita Bullwinkel, Irving Ruan
54	Fall 2018	The End of Trust, a non-fiction issue about digital surveillance co-produced by the Electronic Frontier Foundation; ISBN 9781944211608
55	Spring 2019		Letters: Jack Pendarvis, R.O. Kwon, Alexander Chee, Jenny Traig & Peter McGrath, Joseph Osmundson, and Marcus Burke.
56	Summer 2019	New work from Jose Antonio Vargas, T. C. Boyle, Dantiel W. Moniz, Genevieve Hudson, Jincy Willett, to name a few, and a section of staggering fiction from emerging Nigerian writers soon to be household names, with an introduction by Chimamanda Ngozi Adichie. ISBN 9781944211684	Letters: Emerson Whitney, Jose Antonio Vargas, Michelle Tea, Kristen Iskandrian & Mary Houlihan.
57	Fall 2019	Twenty-first Anniversary Issue; ISBN 9781944211691	Letters: Hanif Abdurraqib, Nikki Darling, Katrina Dodson, Nick Hornby, Morgan Jerkins, Tucker Nichols, Bob Odenkirk, Elena Passarello, Mike Sacks, Avery Trufelman, Novuyo Rosa Tshuma, Deb Olin Unferth.
58	Winter 2019	2040 A.D. ISBN 9781944211707	McSweeney’s 58 is wholly focused on climate change, with speculative fiction from ten contributors, made in collaboration with the Natural Resources Defense Council (NRDC). Contributors include Tommy Orange, Rachel Heng, Luis Alberto Urrea, Kanishk Tharoor, Elif Shafak and more.
59	Spring 2020	Paperback; ISBN 9781944211851	Featuring the conclusions to Issue 57's cliffhanger stories by Oyinkan Braithwaite, Brian Evanson, and Mona Awad.
60	Summer 2020	The Photography Issue; ISBN 9781944211905	McSweeney’s 60 features eight original stories, each accompanied by cinematic, full-color photography from photographer Holly Andres.
61	Fall 2020	Paperback; ISBN 9781944211967	McSweeney’s 61 features stories by Ananda Naima González, Salvador Plascencia, Gerardo Herrera, Christina Wood Martinez, Maria Anderson, Kirsten Sundberg Lunstrum, Amanda Ajamfar, Leah Hampton, Brandon Hobson, and Timothy Moore, art by Jon McNaught, Melissa Schriek, and Gabrielle Bell, five works of posthumously translated microfiction by Argentinian author Hebe Uhart, and letters by Maria Bamford, Ismail Muhammad, Ingrid Rojas Contreras, Julia Dixon Evans, Melissa Febos, and Sally Wen Mao.
64		THE AUDIO ISSUE	Mcsweeney's 64 features stories from Andrew Lelan, Rion Amilcar Scott, Cher Vincent, Adriene Lilly, John Lee Clark, Katie Booth, Cristina Hartmann, Joseph Keckler, Rick Moody. Chris Abrahams Kali Fajardo-Anstine. Aimee Bender, Kelli Jo Ford, Jeremiah Moore Andy Slater Yvette Janine Jackson Ian Chillag Karinne Keithley Syers Kate Soper Shayla Lawz Bassel Aliya Pabani Michael Kirkham Voicemails to the Editor by: Catherine Lacey Graham Mason Sean Cole Barbara Fremont Sayre Quevedo Kellie Mejdrich David Weinberg Bianca Giaever Deborah Kelley James T. Green Audio Tours by: Katharina Smets Edwina Attlee Angela Shackel Claudia Dey Eliza Smith Jacob Winik Sharon Mashihi Renee Gladman Sara Brooke Curtis Jason Reynolds Descriptive Transcripts by: Andrew Sean Greer Hernan Diaz Patrick Cottrell Brandon Hobson Meg Wolitzer Dorothea Lasky Aliya Pabani Alexandra Kleeman Shannon Finnegan Joseph Keckler

== Notes ==
Contributors: A few of the purported contributors—especially in the Letters sections—are pseudonyms used by Eggers and others associated with the journal. Also, although Dale Peck appears in the list of contributors at the end of Issue 1, his name is not attached to any actual contribution, and his name does not appear in the Appendix to The Better of McSweeney's, which lists all of the main contributors to Issues 1 through 10.
Issue 1: First printing of 2,500 copies.
Issues 1–3: The first three issues were reprinted as a set in 2002, and again in 2006.
Issue 5: The four dustjackets: 1) medical drawing of an arm, with text, 2) illustration of a person with a head lesion, 3) plain white cover, and 4) "Simple red cover". All four have a list of contributors on the back; jacket 3 also has the illustration of the head lesion and two medical drawings of arms. The three book covers: A) front similar to jacket 1, but with a different arm and different text, which is reversed; the back shows a collection of small black-and-white drawings with the caption, "The Assembled", B) an outtake from Susan Minot's piece on Uganda, front and back, and C) color photographs of Ted Koppel, front and back. Also, the jackets and books were not matched randomly. Jackets 1 and 4 go over book A, jacket 2 over book B, and jacket 3 over book C.
Issue 10: The retail edition was issued, in a slightly different form, as a Vintage Original paperback in February 2003. (ISBN 978-1-4000-3339-3) It was followed in 2004 by a companion volume, McSweeney's Enchanted Chamber of Astonishing Stories, also edited by Chabon and published as a Vintage Original (ISBN 978-1-4000-7874-5)
Issue 11: 20,000 total copies: black, 9,000 copies; brown, 8,300; yellow/orange, 1,800; blue, 900.
Issue 12: Contents and Letters (white); "Twelve new stories from twelve new writers" (pink); novella by Roddy Doyle (blue); Twenty-Minute Stories (green).
Issue 17: The mail is addressed to: [Sgt.] Maria Vasquez, 4416 North 16th Street, Arlington, VA 22207
Issue 21: According to the editor's note on the copyright page, there are "eight different covers, quiet variations made possible by a quirk of the printing process." The variations are a result of different left/right displacements of the illustration.
Issue 22: The subtitles of Books 2 and 3 are as they appear on the front covers of the books; different subtitles are shown on the case.

== Anthologies ==
- Created in Darkness by Troubled Americans: The Best of McSweeney's Humor Category (Alfred A. Knopf, 2004)
- The Best of McSweeney's, Volume 1 (Hamish Hamilton, 2004)
- The Best of McSweeney's, Volume 2 (Hamish Hamilton, 2005)
- The Better of McSweeney's: Volume One — Issues 1 – 10, Stories and Letters (McSweeney's Books, 2005)
- The Best of McSweeney's (McSweeney's Books, 2013)
