= Barthelme =

Barthelme is a surname. Notable people with the surname include:

- Donald Barthelme (1931–1989), American writer
- Donald Barthelme (architect) (1907–1996), American architect
- Frederick Barthelme (born 1943), American writer
- Maxime Barthelme (born 1988), French footballer
- Steven Barthelme (born 1947), American writer

== See also ==
- Bartelme, another surname
