= Susan Steinberg =

Susan Steinberg or Sue Steinberg may refer to:

- Susan Steinberg (author), American author
- Susan Steinberg (producer), American television producer, director and writer
