= Left Bank Books =

Left Bank Books may refer to:

- Left Bank Books (New York City), US
- Left Bank Books (Seattle), US
- Left Bank Books (St. Louis), US
