= Very Nice (disambiguation) =

"Very Nice" (also known as "Aju Nice") is a 2016 song by South Korean boy group Seventeen.

Very Nice may also refer to:

- "Very nice", a catchphrase of the Sacha Baron Cohen character Borat
- Very Nice, a 2019 novel by Marcy Dermansky
- Very Nice Records, an independent record label started by Dayglow
- Fernando Girão (Very Nice; born 1951), Brazilian singer

== See also ==
- Nice (disambiguation)
- Nice, Nice, Very Nice, a 2009 album by Dan Mangan
- Very Nice, Very Nice, a 1961 Canadian film
