= The Red Car =

2016 novel by Marcy Dermansky

- Author: Marcy Dermansky
- Language: English
- Genre: Fiction
- Published: W. W. Norton & Company
- Publication date: October 11, 2016
- Publication place: United States
- Pages: 208 pp

The Red Car is a 2016 novel written by Marcy Dermansky.

== Plot ==
Leah, a young writer, leaves her life in New York for a chance at happiness in San Francisco when her boss, Judy, dies in a traffic accident and leaves her a red sports car.

== Autobiographical features ==
Some aspects in the novel parallel Dermansky's own life. Like the character Leah, Dermansky attended Haverford College (but unlike Leah, did graduate from there). And after college, she spent several years working odd jobs in San Francisco, before heading to the American South to do an M.A. in fiction (at the University of Southern Mississippi). She married a fellow writing graduate student (Jürgen Fauth) of Germanic background and they lived in Queens, New York together. Her agent (Alex Glass) first contacted her because he had admired a short story of hers, and wanted to know if she was working on a full-length novel. Dermansky related that she "had a friend who had a red car that she loved, and she died in that red car."

== Influences ==
Dermansky has said "The Red Car is my attempt to write a Haruki Murakami novel. A Murakami novel set in the United States, with a female protagonist, written by me, an American woman. This book started out as a writing exercise really" In particular, it shares features with Murakami's book A Wild Sheep Chase, such as a large forward jump in time.

== Reception ==
The New York Times wrote "There should be a literary term for a book you can't stop reading that also makes you stop to think. I slammed down “The Red Car,” Marcy Dermansky's sharp and fiery new novel, in tense fits and jumpy starts, putting down the book to ponder it, but not pondering long because I had to know what happened next."
