= The White Fence (photograph) =

Photograph by Paul Strand

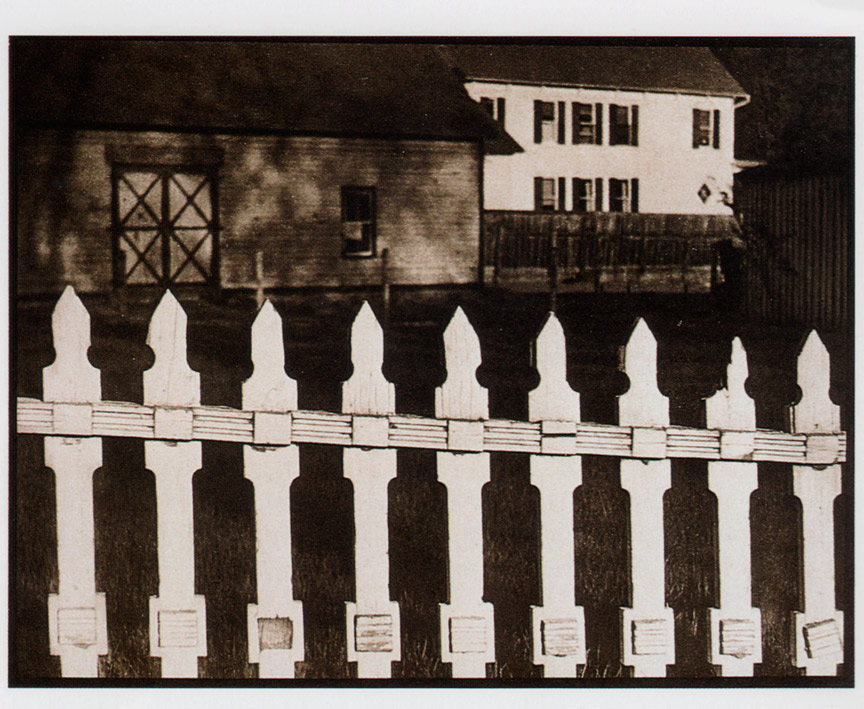
The White Fence (1916) by Paul Strand

The White Fence, also known as The White Fence, Port Kent, New York, is a black and white photograph taken by American photographer Paul Strand, in 1916. The picture was published in the magazine Camera Work, in June 1917, whose editor was Alfred Stieglitz, where it was highly praised by him, specially for its "abstract qualities". It would be later published as part of Paul Strand: Portfolio Three (1976-1977).

== History and description ==
Strand took the picture in Port Kent, New York, in 1916, and it become one of his best known photographs at the time when he was exploring new ground with this visual media, moving way from the pictorialist tradition to what would be considered straight photography. The photograph depicts a subject considered back then not very worthy of the attention of a photographer. It is a close-up in sharp focus of an ordinary white picket fence, with an empty ground between it and the two wooden houses in the background, one of dark color, at the left, and the other, white, at the right and on a more backward plane. The picture still was a living symbol of suburban America, and also of the symbols of ownership and property delimitation, reflecting Strand's purpose to create a truly American expression of art form.

Strand later would explain why he took that photograph: "Because the fence itself was fascinating to me. It was very much alive, very American, very much a part of the country..."

The J. Paul Getty Museum website states that "the image is a powerful tour de force of a bold white foreground laid down over a dark ground, something extremely innovative at this point in the history of photography. Once again, drawing on the ideals of modern art, he exploits the formal properties of the fence to create a dynamic composition that does not employ traditional perspective but yet is very much rooted in reality. In addition, the existence of the fence allowed the photographer the opportunity to experiment with the entire tonal range of the gray scale, literally working from white to black."

== Cultural references ==
The photograph inspired the poem "White Fence/White Fence", by Robert Creeley, published in his book Echoes (1994). Susan Lipper is paying homage to this photo when working on her series titled Trip composed of black-and-white photographs (1993–1998).

== Public collections ==
There are prints of this photograph in several public collections, including the Museum of Modern Art, in New York, the Metropolitan Museum of Art, in New York, the National Gallery of Art, in Washington, D.C., The Art Institute of Chicago, the Philadelphia Museum of Art, the Cleveland Museum of Art, the Middlebury College Museum of Art, in Middlebury, Vermont, the J. Paul Getty Museum, in Los Angeles, and the Victoria and Albert Museum, in London.
