= Lipper (surname) =

Lipper is the surname of:

- David Lipper (born 1974), Canadian actor, director, producer and writer
- Kenneth Lipper, American politician, civil servant, business executive, novelist and documentary producer
- Michael Lipper (1932–1987), Irish politician
- Susan Lipper (born 1953), American photographer
