= Dirty realism =

Subgenre of literature

Dirty realism is a term coined by Bill Buford of Granta magazine to define a North American literary movement. Writers in this sub-category of realism are said to depict the seamier or more mundane aspects of ordinary life in spare, unadorned language.

== Definition ==
The term formed the title of the Summer 1984 edition of Granta, for which Buford wrote an explanatory introduction:

Dirty Realism is the fiction of a new generation of American authors. They write about the belly-side of contemporary life – a deserted husband, an unwanted mother, a car thief, a pickpocket, a drug addict – but they write about it with a disturbing detachment, at times verging on comedy. Understated, ironic, sometimes savage, but insistently compassionate, these stories constitute a new voice in fiction.

== Style ==
Sometimes considered a variety of literary minimalism, dirty realism is characterized by an economy with words and a focus on surface description. Writers working within the genre tend to avoid adverbs, extended metaphor and internal monologue, instead allowing objects and context to dictate meaning. Characters are shown in ordinary, unremarkable occupations, and often a lack of resources and money that creates an internal desperation.

The 1969 film Midnight Cowboy has been called dirty realism, with its bummed-out anti-heroes at the desperate edge of society. Michael Kaplan uses "dirty realism" in his 2021 article, "Dustin Hoffman was kicked out of Sardi's while in character for 'Midnight Cowboy'"

== Notable authors ==
Modern scholarship preponderantly places at the heart of the movement the authors Buford mentions in his Granta 8 essay, including Raymond Carver (1938–1988), Tobias Wolff (b. 1945), Richard Ford (b. 1944), Larry Brown (1951–2004), Frederick Barthelme (b. 1943), Pedro Juan Gutiérrez (b. 1950), Fernando Velázquez Medina (b. 1951), and Jayne Anne Phillips (b. 1952). These authors have rarely accepted or self-applied this term, despite close associations and affinities.

== See also ==
- Kmart realism
- Grunge lit
- Postmodernist literature
