= We All Looked Up =

2015 novel by Tommy Wallach

We All Looked Up is a novel by Tommy Wallach published by Simon & Schuster Books for Young Readers in 2015.

== Premise ==
We All Looked Up follows four high school seniors as they grapple with the impending collision of the asteroid Ardor with Earth. Facing their final months, they struggle to redefine their lives and uncover what truly matters. This apocalyptic thriller explores intense themes, including personal growth, relationships, and survival, with mature content involving violence and sexuality.

== Development and release ==
We All Looked Up is Wallach's debut novel The film rights to the book were optioned by Paramount shortly after its release. The book was later developed as a potential series by Wallach under the auspices of Circle of Confusion TV.

== Reception ==
Stacey Comfort for Booklist wrote that "There are a few moments that feel contrived, but Wallach's debut is nevertheless a literary Breakfast Club for a modern generation, and it will surprise readers expecting another clunky dystopian novel with its solid, realistic writing."

Barbara Hesson of the Calgary Herald called it a "thought provoking story".

Sam Sinclair of School Librarian said that "Tommy Wallach, who is an interesting combination of writer and musician, has created an 'end of the world story' that feels very different to the current crop of dystopian teen novels."

The reviewer from Publishers Weekly wrote that "Debut novelist Wallach increases the tension among characters throughout, ending in a shocking climax that resonates with religious symbolism. Stark scenes alternating between anarchy and police states are counterbalanced by deepening emotional ties and ethical dilemmas, creating a novel that asks far bigger questions than it answers."
