= The Dead Father =

Book by Donald Barthelme

- First edition
- Author: Donald Barthelme
- Cover artist: Ruth Ansel
- Language: English
- Genre: Science fiction Postmodernism
- Publisher: Farrar, Straus and Giroux
- Publication date: 1975
- Media type: Print
- Pages: 192
- ISBN: 978-0-374-52925-3

The Dead Father is a post-modernist novel by author Donald Barthelme published in 1975 by Farrar, Straus and Giroux. The book relates the journey of a vaguely defined entity that symbolizes fatherhood, hauled by a small group of people as the plot unravels through narratives, anecdotes, dialogues, reflexions and allegories presented to the reader through the tools and constructions of postmodern literature, in which the author excelled as a short story writer. Chapter 17 includes an adapted version of a previously published short story, "A Manual for Sons", that is much in the style and character of the novel.

== Characters ==
- The Dead Father – the eponymous character, a godlike, incarnated image of Fatherhood, being hauled towards a redemptory destination.
- Thomas – the archetype of the son, a leader of the expedition.
- Julie – a co-leader of the expedition, a lover of Thomas, a female son.
- Emma – another woman and another lover, in many respects, another Julie.
- Edmund – one of the hauling children, a drunk.
- The Wends – a numerous population of self-fathering indigenes, whose land the Dead Father and his sons are passing through. They are estranged to the notion of fatherhood and prejudiced against it.

== Plot ==
The "Dead Father" is being hauled with a cable by some of his children, across lands and under all weather conditions, towards a goal of an emancipatory nature but that is left mysterious throughout most of the story, to be revealed, at the end of the novel, to be his burial spot.

The story, in a genre typical of the author, does not follow a conventional plot structure, but evolves through a series of revelations, seemingly-unrelated stories, anecdotes, dialogues, descriptive figments, surreal snapshots of reality, personal rendering of the characters' impressions or recordings. The whole of chapter 22 is a stream of bizarre, deconstructed sentences, as if muttered by a narrator too imbued by the urgency of his thoughts to give attention to proper grammar, giving the impression of a deep penetration in the character's consciousness. The plot is thus, more than in other novels, a support for the themes explored. The text is also noted for its word play, irony, absurdist humor, that are abundant in the author's short stories.

== Themes ==
The Dead Father is a synthesis of concepts that define fatherhood, the latter being itself called to refer to other, vaguely defined, notions, such as creation and procreation, in their widest sense. It also assumes a more concrete human appearance, both in its very nature (discoursing and having human feelings such as jealousy, hate, pleasure, pride, etc.) and in more mundane forms (having brows and gray hairs, wearing clothes, a belt, a sword, etc.) It is, at the same time, clearly not a human figure (having gigantic dimensions, being hauled, this thanks to being articulated, having a mechanical leg, etc.). This balance of contradictions culminates in the notion that he/it is alive and dead at the same time. The book opens with the mystifying sentence:

The Dead Father's head. The main thing is, his eyes are open.

Another rhetorical juxtaposition is to present this entity to external enquirers sometimes as "a Dead Father" (to the children), some other times as "the Dead Father" (to the Wends). This continuous play on the Dead Father's genuine nature is one of the thread of the novel. With various characters questioning its identity and being quickly satisfied with elusive answers, the reader equally comes to accept the Dead Father as an incarnated metaphor for notions of Fatherhood, partly rooted in the subconscious, partly in the immediate understanding of a biological father. He clearly also evokes God and, for some analysts, is seen as an allegory of language.

The novel gives an approach to the theme of father-son relationships, probably reflecting largely the author's own attitude toward his own father, expressing the frustration of a creative son in the eye of a demanding father:

A son can never become, in the fullest sense, a father.

It also addresses the more general issue of the creative or procreative process. It captures deep truths by the trick of circling them with opposite statements:

Wrong, the Dead Father said gaily. Wrong, but close. Even older than that, but also younger. Having it both ways is a thing I like.

They thus strike deeply the reader whose own understanding is left to resonate with that angle that their own mood or personal history is more fit to catch. A contradiction that pervades the entire story is the energetic abilities of the Dead Father on the one hand, who is free of his own movements and a master of destruction, able to slay living animals on one occasion or immaterial concepts on another, and his need of being hauled on the other hand, namely towards that goal that he awaits himself although he is unable to clearly identify what it is. Another, parallel concept is the awe and respect that the Dead Father exercises on his children at the same time as his pathetic surrender to their demands of dispossessing him and the distaste he evokes in them. This provides another figurative description of the feelings of those created towards their creator. This technique is applied repeatedly in various other occasions, providing insights into complex issues of human relationships.
