= Bob the Gambler (novel) =

Book by Frederick Barthelme

- Author: Frederick Barthelme
- Language: English
- Genre: Novel
- Publication date: 1997
- Publication place: United States
- Pages: 224
- ISBN: 039592474X
- Preceded by: Painted Desert (1995)
- Followed by: Elroy Nights (2003)

Bob the Gambler (1997) is Frederick Barthelme's seventh novel. It was published by Houghton-Mifflin.

== Plot ==
From the Kirkus review of the book: "Raymond Kaiser, his wife Jewel, and her daughter from a previous marriage, RV, all quietly enjoy life in Biloxi, Miss., a "simple, easy, cheap" town on the Gulf Coast. With work as an architect drying up, Ray finds himself increasingly interested in the glitzy world of offshore gambling, especially at the Paradise, where Jewel wins over $1,000 on their first trip. In their daily life, "everything's dull", so it is no wonder that Jewel and Ray enjoy the visceral excitement of gambling. They soon graduate from slots to the blackjack table, and slowly find themselves down by over $4,000. Meanwhile, back home, RV seems headed into a downward spiral of teen rebellion—boy trouble, substance experimenting, and body piercings. It doesn't help that her parents are largely absent, spending their nights at Paradise. When Ray's father dies, it sends him further into a midlife crisis. He comes to see himself no longer as "an ordinary guy", but as a full-time gambler. The problem is—he's not very good at it. Spending 18 hours at a time in the casino does nothing but increase his debts. Maxing out a handful of credit cards, he finds himself over $35,000 in the hole, but still juiced by "the losses, the excitement, the hopes, the desperation, the high". Quitting architecture altogether, Ray and Jewel decide to downsize, selling their belongings and moving in with Ray's mother. In their new simplicity, this besieged family finally finds that happiness is not in middle-class stability, nor in the quick fix of gambling's artificial Paradise, but in their everyday Edenic lives.

== Reception ==
Bob the Gambler was named as a New York Times Notable Book. The New York Times Book Review called it a "wise and funny novel". John Barth said it was "masterfully observed".
