= The King (novel) =

- Author: Donald Barthelme
- Language: English
- Publisher: Harper & Row
- Publication date: 1990
- Dewey Decimal: 813.54
- LC Class: PS3552.A76 K56

The King is a 1990 novel by American writer Donald Barthelme, in which various characters from the Arthurian legends are still alive in the World War II period.

The book received several reviews:

- Review by Faren Miller (1990) in Locus, #356 September 1990
- Review by Orson Scott Card (1990) in The Magazine of Fantasy & Science Fiction, December 1990
- Review by Dorota Djaczenko (1997) in Talizman #2-3 1997, p. 112 (in Polish)
- Review in The New Yorker
- Review in The New York Times

The novel has also been subject to scholarly analysis.
