= Thanks for the Trouble =

Thanks for the Trouble is a novel by Tommy Wallach published in 2015.

== Premise ==
Thanks for the Trouble is the story of 17-year old boy Parker who writes fairy tales, and the enigmatic girl Zelda.

== Development and release ==
Thanks for the Trouble is the second novel written by Tommy Wallach.

== Reception ==
The reviewer from Publishers Weekly said that Wallach "delivers well-rounded, witty characters [...] all contemplating whether living a full life is better than living a long one. Bittersweet moments intersect with the intricate fairy tales Parker writes, compelling readers to judge what is real and what is make-believe."

Jennifer Barnes for Booklist said that "Zelda's manic-pixie-dream-girl qualities become especially exaggerated by Parker's seeming ease with her eventual decision. Still, Wallach offers much for teen readers to ponder: immortality, the future, how we make peace with the death of loved ones, and the choices we make with the time we have on this earth."

Sarah Welch for BookPage said that "Tommy Wallach offers a sweet coming-of-age novel about a young man learning to overcome loss. Presented as a comically long college application essay, Parker’s narrative is brash and appropriately childish, yet attentive and at times profound. Though the framing device is a bit far-fetched, and Zelda leans a bit too far toward Manic Pixie Dream Girl, there's a lot to love about the poignant, lighthearted Thanks for the Trouble."

Jeff Giles for The New York Times Book Review said that "The cover of Wallach's second novel (after the best-selling “We All Looked Up”) looks like a still from a lost Wes Anderson movie ... It's a pleasure to watch Zelda flirt, fling money and coax Parker out of what, emotionally speaking, is less a shell than a bunker. At its best, the novel carries a worthy message: No life is without pain — or promise."

John Affleck for the Gold Coast Bulletin said that "This is a weird but engaging story about a 17-year-old boy who meets an enigmatic girl who might or might not be 246 years old."
