= Bartelme =

Bartelme is a surname. Notable people with the surname include:

- Mary Bartelme (1866–1954), American judge and lawyer
- Nicole Bartelme (born 1967), American artist and founder of film festival
- Philip Bartelme (1876–1954), American academic athletic director
- Tony Bartelme (born 1963), American journalist and author

== See also ==
- Barthelme, another surname
- Bartelme, Wisconsin
