= Forty Stories =

Short story collection by Donald Barthelme

- First edition cover
- Author: Donald Barthelme
- Publisher: G.P. Putnam's Sons
- Publication date: September 1, 1987
- ISBN: 978-0-399-13299-5

Forty Stories collects forty of American writer and professor Donald Barthelme's short stories, several of which originally appeared in The New Yorker. The book was first published by G. P. Putnam's Sons in 1987.

While Sixty Stories includes many longer narratives, the stories in Forty Stories are pithy. Many last for fewer than five pages, and display Barthelme's flash fictional tendencies. They also abound in historical references and surreal juxtapositions. One story involves a World War I Secret Police investigator, a trio of German warplanes, and the artist Paul Klee. Another is a parodic rewriting of the fairy-tale Bluebeard, perhaps inspired by Angela Carter's story "The Bloody Chamber." Yet another consists of a single seven-page-long sentence (without a concluding period).

== Contents ==
1. Chablis
2. On the Deck
3. The Genius
4. Opening
5. Sindbad
6. The Explanation
7. Concerning the Bodyguard
8. RIF
9. The Palace at Four A.M.
10. Jaws
11. Conversations with Goethe
12. Affection
13. The New Owner
14. Paul Klee [full title: "Engineer-Private Paul Klee Misplaces an Aircraft Between Milbertshoffen and Cambrai, March 1916"]
15. Terminus
16. The Educational Experience
17. Bluebeard
18. Departures
19. Visitors
20. The Wound
21. At the Tolstoy Museum
22. The Flight of Pigeons from the Palace
23. A Few Moments of Sleeping and Waking
24. The Temptation of St. Anthony
25. Sentence
26. Pepperoni
27. Some of Us Had Been Threatening Our Friend Colby
28. Lightning
29. The Catechist
30. Porcupines at the university
31. Sakrete
32. Captain Blood
33. 110 West Sixty-first Street
34. The Film
35. Overnight to Many Distant Cities
36. Construction
37. Letters to the Editore
38. Great Days
39. The Baby
40. January

== Sixty Stories ==
Sixty Stories, a companion volume to Forty Stories, was published six years earlier, in 1981. It contains stories from Barthelme's first six collections.
