= Adrienne Miller =

American writer (born 1972)

- Born: 1972 (age 53–54); Columbus, Ohio, U.S.
- Occupation: Writer

Adrienne Miller (born 1972) is an American writer. From 1997 to 2005, she was the fiction editor of Esquire.

== Early life ==
Miller was born in 1972 in Columbus, Ohio. She lived in a small farming community surrounded by silos and cornfields until she was nine years old. At nine, her parents moved to a suburb of Akron, Ohio.

== Working life ==
Miller moved to New York City in the spring of 1994, a week before her college graduation. She worked at GQ, as an editorial assistant, then as an assistant editor. In 1997, she became the literary editor of Esquire, a position she held until leaving in 2005. In 2006, that position was filled by Tom Chiarella. Her novel, The Coast of Akron, was published by Farrar, Straus and Giroux in 2005.

During the fall semester of 2009, Miller took a teaching position at the University of Pennsylvania's College of Arts and Sciences, where she taught a writing seminar on Russian author Vladimir Nabokov and Swedish filmmaker Ingmar Bergman.

Miller's 2020 memoir, In the Land of Men, was called a literary junkie's "dream come true" by Associated Press reviewer Lincee Ray.

== Personal life ==
In the March 2018 issue of Vogue, Miller published an account of the sexual harassment she encountered at GQ and Esquire.

== Bibliography ==
- Miller, Adrienne, The Coast of Akron (New York : Farrar, Straus and Giroux, 2005). ISBN 0-374-12512-0
- Miller, Adrienne. In the Land of Men: A Memoir. (Ecco, 2020.) ISBN 0062682415

== Resources ==
- Interview with Adrienne Miller
- "The Coast of Akron". Salon. May 6, 2005. Archived from the original on November 11, 2006.
