= Sixty Stories (book) =

1981 short story collection by Donald Barthelme

First edition

Sixty Stories is a collection of sixty short stories written by Donald Barthelme, several of which originally appeared in The New Yorker. The book was first published by G. P. Putnam's Sons in 1981.

== Stories ==
Sixty Stories includes works from the writer's first six short-story collections: Come Back, Dr. Caligari (1964), Unspeakable Practices, Unnatural Acts (1968), City Life (1970), Sadness (1972), Amateurs (1976), and Great Days (1979). The full contents are as follows:

- Margins
- A Shower of Gold
- Me and Miss Mandible
- For I'm the Boy
- Will You Tell Me?
- The Balloon
- The President
- Game
- Alice
- Robert Kennedy Saved from Drowning
- Report
- The Dolt
- See the Moon?
- The Indian Uprising
- Views of My Father Weeping
- Paraguay
- On Angels
- The Phantom of the Opera's Friend
- City Life
- Kierkegaard Unfair to Schlegel
- The Falling Dog
- The Policemen's Ball
- The Glass Mountain
- Critique de la Vie Quotidienne
- The Sandman
- Traumerei
- The Rise of Capitalism
- A City of Churches
- Daumier
- The Party
- Eugenie Grandet
- Nothing: A Preliminary Account
- A Manual for Sons
- At the End of the Mechanical Age
- Rebecca
- The Captured Woman
- I Bought a Little City
- The Sergeant
- The School
- The Great Hug
- Our Work and Why We Do It
- The Crisis
- Cortes and Montezuma
- The New Music
- The Zombies
- The King of Jazz
- Morning
- The Death of Edward Lear
- The Abduction from the Seraglio
- On the Steps of the Conservatory
- The Leap
- Aria
- The Emerald
- How I Write My Songs
- The Farewell
- The Emperor
- Thailand
- Heroes
- Bishop
- Grandmother's House

== Reception ==
The collection was received with great enthusiasm by critics. In The New York Times, critic Anatole Broyard wrote, "Donald Barthelme may have influenced the short story in his time as much as Ernest Hemingway or John O'Hara did in theirs. They loosened the story's grip on the security of plot, but he broke it altogether and forced the form to live dangerously. O'Hara played with the brand names of our things, and Donald Barthelme plays with the brand names of our ideas. While Hemingway and O'Hara worked with specific feelings, he works with the structure of our emotional makeup. A Barthelme collection like 'Sixty Stories' is a Whole Earth Catalogue of life in our time."

In The New York Times Book Review, critic John Romano called Barthelme a "comic genius," adding, "The will to please us, to make us sit up and laugh with surprise, is greater than the will to disconcert. The chief thing to say about Barthelme, beyond praise for his skill, which seems to me supererogatory, is that he is fiercely committed to showing us a good time, at least in the vast proportion of his work. The spirit is: Many things are silly, especially about modern language, and there is much sadness everywhere, but all is roughly well. So let's try and enjoy ourselves, as intelligently as possible...The point is that we are not finished needing, from marvelously gifted writers such as he, help with the vicissitudes of modern life."

== Forty Stories ==
Forty Stories, a companion volume to Sixty Stories, was published six years later, in 1987.
