= Twins (Dermansky novel) =

2006 novel by Marcy Dermansky

- Author: Marcy Dermansky
- Language: English
- Genre: Realistic Fiction/young adult
- Published: October 17th, 2006 William Morrow and Company
- Publication place: United States
- Media type: Print (Hardcover)
- Pages: 304
- ISBN: 006075978X; 978-0060759780

Twins is a young adult novel written by Marcy Dermansky. It was originally published on October 17, 2006, by William Morrow and Company. It is written in the first person, but the narration alternates between two twin sisters, Sue and Chloe. The events described begin on the eve of the twins' thirteenth birthday, when they agree to get matching tattoos to prove their bond is stronger than DNA.
