= The Slightly Irregular Fire Engine or The Hithering Thithering Djinn =

1971 children's book by Donald Barthelme

- Author: Donald Barthelme
- Language: English
- Genre: Children's literature
- Publisher: Farrar, Straus & Giroux
- Publication date: August 27, 1971
- Publication place: United States

The Slightly Irregular Fire Engine or The Hithering Thithering Djinn is a 1971 children's book written by Donald Barthelme. It tells the story of a girl who enters a magical house that appears in her backyard and the characters she meets inside. Barthelme collected the visuals used in the book from 19th-century engravings and then constructed the story around the visuals.

== Plot summary ==
One morning in 1887, a young girl named Matilda awakens to find a miniature house has appeared magically in her backyard. As she approaches to look inside, the house expands large enough for her to enter. Hoping to find a fire engine toy, she is greeted at the entrance by two doormen. Inside, she meets a rainmaker, a pirate, and the titular djinn, who guides her through the house. Matilda leaves when she hears her nurse calling and asks if the house will be there tomorrow; the djinn says no, but he will leave her a gift before the house leaves. The next morning, Matilda finds a green Silsby fire engine in the yard.

== Reception ==
Despite winning the National Book Award for Young People's Literature in 1973, the book was controversial, with one of the judges saying it was "not a notable piece of literature for children". The Boston Globe's review questioned whether the book was the best of the year, and the New York Times said the visuals, with few exceptions, do "nothing but confuse the child reader" and failed to meet a "child's need for a realized story" Jabari Asim had higher praise years after release, saying in 2006 that the book had "much that will surprise and please" children.
