= New World Writing (current) =

- Editor: Frederick Barthelme
- Categories: Literary Magazine
- Founder: Frederick Barthelme
- Founded: 1995 as Mississippi Review Online
- Country: United States
- Website: newworldwriting.net

New World Writing (formerly Blip Magazine) is the reinvention of Mississippi Review Online, a personal website put online in 1995 by the editor of Mississippi Review, Frederick Barthelme. It is the online heir of Mississippi Review (established by Barthelme in 1977). During Barthelme's time as editor, Raymond Carver said Mississippi Review "is one of the most remarkable and indispensable literary journals of our time.". The editors working on Mississippi Review prior to 2010 moved to Blip with Barthelme after he left the University of Southern Mississippi.

Notable contributors (since 2010) include George Saunders, Marcy Demansky, Jurgen Fauth, Woody Evans, Meg Pokrass, Mary Grimm, Floyd Skloot, and others. In its previous incarnation, Blip had over 1000 stories and poems in its archive, including work by such writers as Thom Jones, Ben Marcus, Francine Prose, Padgett Powell, Barry Hannah, Tom Drury, Curtis Sittenfeld, Tao Lin, John Barth, Christine Schutt, Mary Gaitskill, Rick Bass, and Ben Neihart.

In late 2012 a post at blipmagazine.net announced a name change: BlipMagazine was now New World Writing:

BlipMagazine has changed its name to New World Writing after the great literary magazine of the 1950s. They were, of course, thinking of world writing, whereas we are thinking more of the (perpetually) new world. We hesitated in any case, as it is a grand old name and we are perhaps insufficiently grand. Still, with some squinting, we are in the ballpark, or near the ballpark, or in a position from which we can sort of see the ballpark. Or so we hope and imagine.
