= Jacob Magraw-Mickelson =

American artist (born 1982)

Jacob Magraw-Mickelson (born 1982) is an American artist who lives and works in Pasadena, California. He graduated with a BFA in illustration from the Art Center College of Design, in Pasadena, in 2004. His work includes paintings, illustrations, and silk-screen prints.

== Work ==
Most of Magraw-Mickelson’s paintings and drawings depict brightly colored organic forms, sometimes interlaced with architectural scenes. His work is characteristically detailed and his forms delicate and often plant-like. His drawings have accompanied several articles in The New York Times. His paintings have been featured in Anthropologie’s 2007 Summer catalog and on the cover of Chuck Palahniuk’s book, Rant: An Oral Biography of Buster Casey. Magraw-Mickelson’s work has also appeared in Fishwrap Magazine, McSweeney’s Quarterly, and Dear New Girl, or Whatever Your Name Is, edited by Lisa Wagner (McSweeney's, 2005).

== Exhibitions ==
Magraw-Mickelson has shown work in numerous group exhibitions and in the following solo exhibitions:

- 2006 Tiny Island, Motel, Portland, OR
- 2006 Marvelous Sea, Giant Robot, Los Angeles, CA
- 2007 Richard Heller Gallery, Los Angeles, CA
