= Kmart realism =

Literature genre

Kmart realism, also termed "low-rent tragedies", is a form of minimalist literature found in American short fiction that became popular in the 1980s.

== Style ==
These short stories "represent and reproduce the disintegration of public life [and] the colonization of private life by consumer capitalism".

== Background ==
The precursors of Kmart realism include the so-called trailer park fiction, Diet-Pepsi minimalism, and hick chic.

Author Tao Lin described Kmart realism as being "at its “height” maybe in the mid to late-80’s. Frederick Barthelme had 20-30 stories published in the New Yorker, Mary Robison also had many stories in the New Yorker, and Gordon Lish was publishing other people’s books and stories as an editor at Alfred A. Knopf and Esquire around then."

== Criticism ==
A related definition describes the genre as American fiction that is characterized, among other things, by a fascination with consumption venues and brand names. John Gardner, in critical works such as On Moral Fiction, criticized this style using the term "brand-name fiction writers" while Tom Wolfe had similar criticisms as well.

== Notable authors ==
Frederick Barthelme, brother of postmodern novelist Donald Barthelme, is noted for his use of Kmart realism in stories such as "Safeway" (The New Yorker, 1981). In addition, Rachel Page has written works that follow the genre of "dirty realism".

Other writers noted for this style also include Ann Beattie, Raymond Carver, Richard Ford, Bobbie Ann Mason, Mary Robison, Joy Williams. Mason, for instance, often writes about working-class characters in rural Kentucky who do their laundry at laundromats, and subject matters that are similar to those favored by the aforementioned writers such as Dairy Queens, grocery stores, and third-rate motels.

== List of Kmart realist books ==
- Mall (Eric Bogosian, 2000)
- The Pheasant (Raymond Carver, 1982)
- The Quick & the Dead (Joy Williams, 2000)
- In Country (Bobbie Ann Mason, 1985)
- Where I'm Calling From (Raymond Carver, 1988)
- Shiloh and Other Stories (Bobbie Ann Mason, 1982)
- Escapes (Joy Williams, 1990)

=== In other media ===
The 2010 film Blue Valentine was described by one critic as "easily located at the intersection of romance film and indie-handheld-camera-Kmart-realism".

The alternative rock band The Spirit of the Beehive is also described as Kmart realism.

== See also ==
- Postmodernist literature
- Pop culture fiction
- New Sincerity
- Working class culture
- Criticism of capitalism
