= Left Bank Books (New York City) =

Bookstore in Manhattan, New York

General information
- Location: 41 Perry Street; New York, NY 10014
- Coordinates: 40.73609°N 74.00280°W

Left Bank Books is a Manhattan independent bookstore located in the West Village. It was initially established as a rare books store in 2005 after bookseller Kim Herzinger bought Bookleaves, after which a landlord conflict caused Herzinger to move it to another storefront nearby in 2010. In 2016, it closed its physical location but maintained operations as an online business led by new owners Erik DuRon and Jess Kuronen. In 2019, DuRon and Kuronen reopened the bookstore on Perry Street in the West Village. It has since retained its emphasis on providing a selection of used books alongside collecting and selling rare books.

== History ==
=== 1992–2009: Bookleaves, Left Bank Books, and the West Village ===
In 2009, The New York Times wrote that "For much of the last century, the West Village has had a leading role in the New York literature scene, known both as cutting edge and well read", naming Jack Kerouac, Norman Mailer, Theodore Dreiser, and other writers who once called the neighborhood home. The neighborhood was home to several bookstores which had been open for decades; however, due to the emergence of the internet, with businesses like Barnes & Noble and Amazon, bookselling became challenging, causing several bookstores to close in the nineties.

In 1992, a bookstore named Bookleaves opened, with only 300 square feet of space, in the West Village on West Fourth Street and Bank Street. Over a decade later, in 2005, Herzinger, a retired college professor of literature, stumbled upon the store and later asked owner Arthur Farrier if the bookstore was up for sale. After purchasing Bookleaves' collection and taking over the lease, Herzinger oriented the bookstore—now called Left Bank Books—toward selling rare books: signed, first edition, and others. Some of Herzinger's acquisitions included a first edition of Invisible Man with an inscription from Ralph Ellison and Norman Mailer's copy of The Naked and the Dead which Herzinger was putting up for sale for $10,000. Farrier continued to work at Left Bank Books for some time.

=== 2010–2016: Left Bank Books' relocation, Herzinger's move ===
Through the early 2000s, bookstores in the West Village and nearby Greenwich Village continued to close due to financial difficulties and internet competition: Librería Lectorum closed in 2007, and Oscar Wilde Bookshop closed in 2009. Also in 2009, Left Bank Books' landlord told Herzinger that the bookstore's lease wouldn't be renewed and thus scheduled its closure for January 2010. Herzinger then took on another job at the University of Houston–Victoria but also considered relocating Left Bank Books to another storefront on 12th Street and Eighth Avenue.

In January 2010, Herzinger moved Left Bank Books nearby to 17 Eighth Avenue. Shortly after, he moved to Austin, Texas to resume teaching and delegated the bookstore's management and operations to his staff.

=== 2016–present: DuRon and Kuronen's ownership ===
In March of 2016, Left Bank Books closed its storefront indefinitely; a friend of the owners stated that running an independent bookstore in the area was becoming economically infeasible. However, staff members Erik DuRon and Jess Kuronen bought the bookstore from Kerzinger and continued its bookselling operations as an online store, still specializing in rare books. DuRon had been in the antiquarian bookselling industry for decades, with past experience at Bauman Rare Books; Kuronen, a graphic designer, had worked at the bookstore while studying art at Cooper Union.

In 2019, DuRon and Kuronen reopened the bookstore as a brick and mortar location on 41 Perry Street in the West Village. Wanting to stay faithful to Herzinger's original vision for the bookstore, DuRon and Kuronen intended for the store to sell both used paperbacks as well as a more curated selection of rare, vintage books. As such, they began selling books "for as little as $10 and up to $10,000, and everything in between." In 2024, Vogue included the bookstore in their guide to New York City's best bookstores.
