= Fiction (American magazine) =

- Discipline: Literary magazine
- Language: English
- Edited by: Mark Jay Mirsky

Publication details
- History: 1972 to present
- Publisher: City College of New York (USA)
- Frequency: Biannual

Standard abbreviations
- ISO 4: Fiction

Indexing
- ISSN: 0046-3736

Links
- Journal homepage

Fiction is an American literary magazine dedicated to innovative and experimental writing. It was founded in 1972 by Donald Barthelme, Max Frisch, and Mark Jay Mirsky, who served as its editor for more than 50 years. It is published by the City College of New York.

In its early years, Fiction was published in tabloid format and featured experimental work by such writers as John Barth, Jerome Charyn, Italo Calvino, Ronald Sukenick, Steve Katz, Russell Banks, Samuel Beckett, and J. G. Ballard. It later took the form of a more traditional paperback literary magazine, publishing short works by Reinaldo Arenas, Isaac Babel, Donald Barthelme, Jackson Bliss, Mei Chin, Julio Cortázar, Marguerite Duras, Natalia Ginzburg, Clarice Lispector, Robie Macauley, Robert Musil, Joyce Carol Oates, Manuel Puig, and John Yau.

Though the magazine focuses on publishing fiction, it has also featured writings with an autobiographical slant, such as excerpts from Robert Musil's diaries and letters.

== See also ==
- List of literary magazines
