= Donald Barthelme (architect) =

American architect (1907–1996)

- Born: August 4, 1907; Galveston, Texas, U.S.
- Died: July 16, 1996 (aged 88); Houston, Texas
- Education: Rice Institute; University of Pennsylvania (1930)
- Occupations: Architect, Professor
- Employer(s): University of Houston, 1946–1973
- Notable work: Hall of State, Dallas
- Spouse: Helen Bechtold (m. 1930)
- Children: Donald Barthelme Jr.; Frederick Barthelme; Steven Barthelme

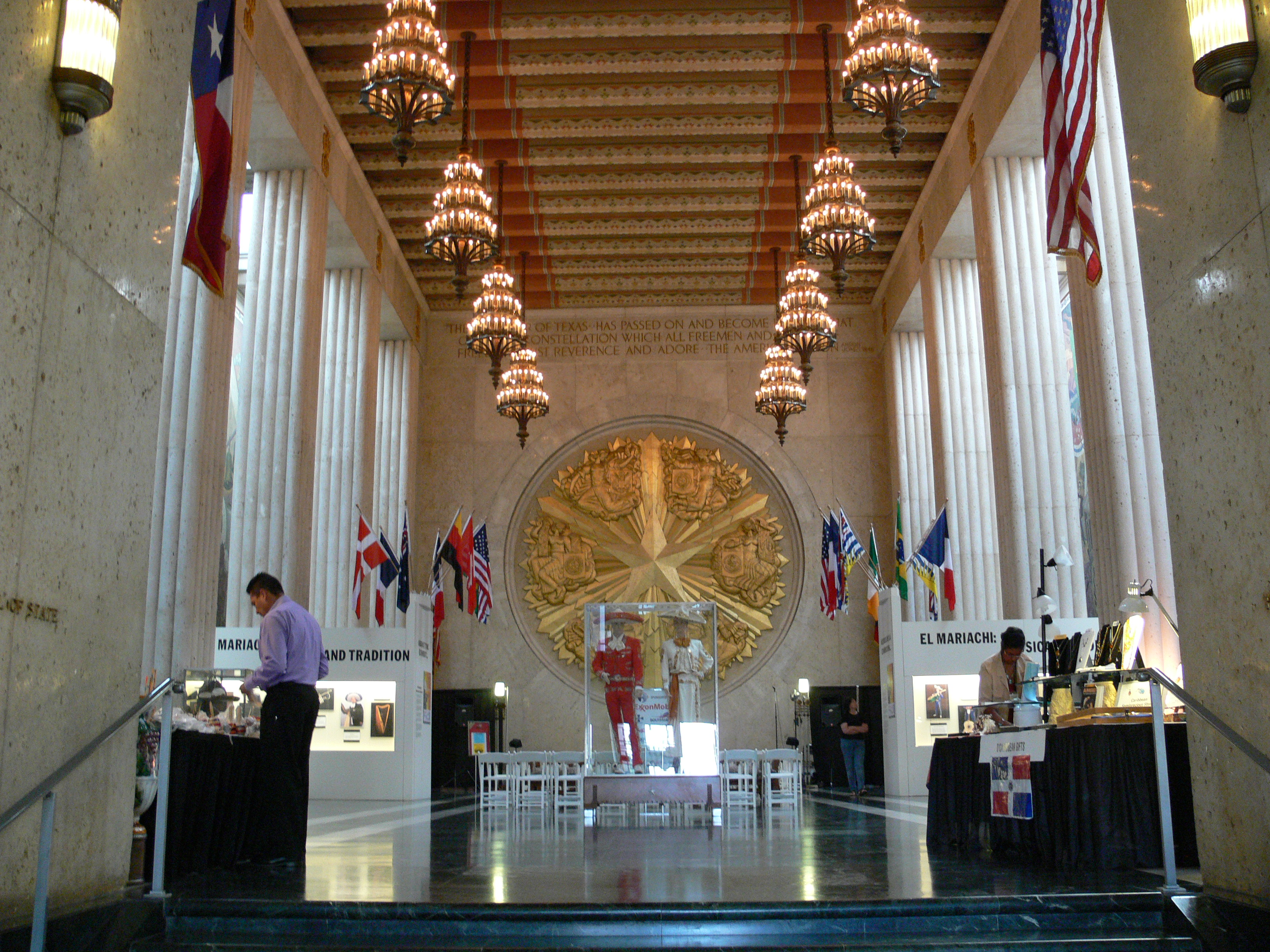
Dallas Fair Park Hall of State

Donald Barthelme Sr. (August 4, 1907 – July 16, 1996) was an architect in Houston, Texas, a teacher of architecture as a professor at the University of Houston and Rice University, and the father of novelists Donald Barthelme Jr, Frederick Barthelme, and Steven Barthelme.

== Early life ==
Barthelme was born on August 4, 1907, in Galveston, Texas. After studying at the Rice Institute in Houston for two years, in 1926 he transferred to the University of Pennsylvania, graduating in 1930. After graduation, he worked as an architect in Philadelphia until late in 1932, when he returned to Texas.

== Career ==
A highlight of Barthelme's early career in Texas was his work on the Texas Centennial Exposition, for which he was the lead designer of the exposition's centerpiece building, the Hall of State, which is considered a masterpiece of the Art Deco style and is now the home of the Dallas Historical Society. After the outbreak of World War II he worked on war-related projects. He was a designer on the Avion Village Housing Project near Dallas and later was supervising architect for the Big Spring Air Base in West Texas and war-related housing projects in Galveston and Sweeny, Texas.

Beginning in 1942 and continuing through his retirement from architecture practice in 1963, he designed many school buildings for the West Columbia Independent School District in Brazoria County, Texas. His school designs, the best known of which was the West Columbia Elementary School (1951), earned national and international awards and were featured in numerous publications. He came to be considered an expert on school design, wrote and lectured extensively on the subject, and was elected a Fellow of the American Institute of Architects (AIA) in 1955 in recognition of his work in school architecture. His other notable projects included the St. Rose of Lima Church and School (1948), which was the first modernist Catholic church in Houston and the first building in the city to win an award of merit from the AIA.

From 1946 to 1973 Barthelme served on the faculty of the Architecture Department at the University of Houston, where he was influential in helping to shape the program in its early years. He also was William Ward Watkin Professor and chairman of the Architecture Department at Rice University from 1959 to 1961, and spent time as a visiting professor at both the University of Pennsylvania and Tulane University.

== Personal life ==
The year he graduated, he married Helen Bechtold of Philadelphia. The couple had five children. The eldest, Donald Barthelme Jr. (1931–1989), became famous as a writer and novelist, and another son, Frederick Barthelme (1943- ), became a prominent exponent of minimalism in American fiction and a runner up to John Updike for the 2004 PEN/Faulkner Award. A third son, Steven Barthelme, is also a prominent novelist.

His daughter Joan Barthelme Bugbee became the first female executive at Pennzoil Corporation. His son Peter Rohe Barthelme (1939-2010) was an advertising executive and writer.

== Death ==
Donald Barthelme Sr. died on July 16, 1996. He was 88.
