= Paradise (Barthelme novel) =

1986 novel by Donald Barthelme

- Author: Donald Barthelme
- Pages: 208 pages

Paradise is a 1986 novel by American writer Donald Barthelme. The novel concerns an architect, Simon, and his creation of an apparent paradise for himself.

The novel takes place in New York City.

== Reception ==
The New York Times critic Michiko Kakutani compared the novel unfavorably to Barthelme's earlier novels and short stories, writing that it "[...] has little of the vitality or inventiveness of Mr. Barthelme's earlier work and none of its provocative intelligence." Elizabeth Jolley, also writing in The New York Times, praised the novel's humor and referred to it as a "shock and a revelation".
