= Jürgen Fauth =

American novelist

- Born: August 4, 1969 (age 57); Wiesbaden, Germany
- Education: University of Southern Mississippi
- Occupation: Author
- Writing career
- Period: 2000–present
- Notable works: Kino, The Ashakiran Tape
- Website: jurgenfauth.com

Jürgen Fauth (born August 4, 1969, in Wiesbaden, Germany) is a German-American film critic, translator, editor, photographer, and author. His debut novel Kino was published in 2012 by Atticus Books.

Jürgen received his doctorate from the Center for Writers at the University of Southern Mississippi. He was a longtime associate editor for fiction at Review Web (now Blip Magazine), and has taught English and Creative Writing at USM and Manhattan's Laboratory Institute of Merchandising. In 1996, Jürgen founded Der Brennende Busch, one of the first German-language literary web magazines. His short fiction has appeared in Berkeley Fiction Review, La Petite Zine, Eclectica, Vestal Review, Chiron Review, Blue Moon Review, among others. He has written for Wiesbadener Kurier, New York Newsday, Flavorpill, and The Huffington Post, and he is a long-time film critic for About.com

In 2008, Jürgen launched the literary community Fictionaut together with Carson Baker. In 2015, Jürgen published the Phish-themed rock'n roll mystery Head Cases Vol. 1: The Ashakiran Tape. He lives in Berlin and Dakar.
