= Mark Jay Mirsky =

American novelist (1939–2025)

Mark Jay Mirsky (1939 – December 5, 2025) was an American writer and professor of English at City College of New York.

== Life and career ==
Mirsky was born in Boston, Massachusetts, in 1939. His first three novels (Thou Worm Jacob, Proceedings of the Rabble, and Blue Hill Avenue) present a humorous and scathing portrait of the Jewish community of and around Blue Hill Avenue in Dorchester. He also published a pair of novellas under the name The Secret Table. The first story, "Dorchester, Home and Garden," deals with a man who returns to the burnt-out Jewish district on Blue Hill Avenue, and the second, "Onan's Child", retells the biblical story of Onan.

His later, more experimental, works include The Red Adam, a novel written in the form of a "discovered" document unearthed in a Massachusetts library sometime in the 1940s. Mirsky also wrote several books of nonfiction including My Search for the Messiah: Studies and Wanderings in Israel and America and The Absent Shakespeare. His 2003 book, Dante, Eros, and Kabbalah, combines literary criticism, Jewish mysticism, and personal narrative.

Mirsky edited and wrote the introduction for Diaries: Robert Musil 1899-1942, and published several works and articles in The Partisan Review, New Directions Annual, The Boston Sunday Globe, and The New York Times Book Review. He was editor of Fiction, a literary magazine at City College which he co-founded in 1972 with Donald Barthelme and Max Frisch.

One of Mirsky's plays, Mother Hubbard's Cupboard, was performed as part of the 2007 New York International Fringe Festival.

Mirsky died on December 5, 2025, at the age of 86.

== Bibliography ==
- Thou Worm Jacob (1967), Macmillan.
- Proceedings of the Rabble (1970), The Bobbs-Merrill Company.
- Blue Hill Avenue (1972), The Bobbs-Merrill Company.
- The Secret Table (1975), NY Fiction Collective.
- My Search for the Messiah: Studies and Wanderings in Israel and America (1977), Macmillan .
- The Red Adam (1990), Sun & Moon Press.
- The Absent Shakespeare (2002), Fairleigh Dickinson University Press.
- Dante, Eros and Kabbalah (2003), Syracuse University Press.
- Puddingstone: Franklin Park (2014), self-published on Amazon.
- A Mother's Steps: A Meditation on Silence (2016), self-published on Amazon.
