= Kim Herzinger =

American writer

Kim Herzinger is a critic, a Pushcart Prize-winning writer of fiction, and the editor of three Donald Barthelme collections. He taught at the University of Southern Mississippi and owns and operates Left Bank Books in New York City.
