= Tom Chiarella =

American journalist

Tom Chiarella (born 1961) is Hampton and Esther Boswell Distinguished University Professor of Creative Writing at DePauw University and writer-at-large and fiction editor of Esquire magazine.

== Early life and education ==
Chiarella was born in Rochester, New York in 1961, and received a BA in Studio Art/Writing at St. Lawrence University, 1983, and an MFA in Fiction Writing from the University of Alabama in 1987.

== Career ==
Chiarella has written on movies, television, sports, culture, masculinity, food and culinary arts, self-improvement, drug addiction, architecture and sexuality. He's authored in-depth profiles and/or cover stories on actors Halle Berry, Charlize Theron, Daniel Craig, Ben Affleck, Ryan Gosling, Liam Neeson, Clive Owen, Brooklyn Decker, Carmen Electra, athletes (New England Patriots Quarterback) Tom Brady, (NBA player) Gilbert Arenas, (PGA Golfer) John Daly (for which he won a feature writing award from the Golf Writers Association of America), (retired NFL Lineman) Kyle Turley and media figures (Billy Bush). Alongside the dozens of articles in Esquire since 1996, his magazine work appeared in The New Yorker, Golf Digest, Links, O: The Oprah Magazine, The London Observer, Men's Style (Australia), Forbes.com, Fashion (Canada), Washington Golf Monthly, Links, Travel & Leisure Golf, Indianapolis Monthly, Indy Men's Magazine, Hemispheres, and has been syndicated internationally in 21 countries. He periodically writes an on-line column for Esquire.com called "Advice About Women." Twice a finalist for the National Magazine Award, he won in 2009 as part of an Esquire writing team for The Esquire Almanac of Steak, his contribution being a feature called "Butcher," the memoir of his stint as butcher for Kincaid's Meats in Indianapolis, IN. Selected for Best American Magazine Writing twice (2004 & 2009), named by Sport Illustrated.com as the "best golf writer you never heard of," Chiarella's work has further been cited in Best American Essays, Best American Travel Writing and Best American Sports Writing.

In 2005, he held the post of as fiction editor of Esquire, publishing the works of Stephen King, Daniel Woodrell, Ralph Lombreglia, Chris Adrian, James Lee Burke, Gary Shytengart and others. He returned to writing for the magazine full-time in 2009.

A periodic guest on radio talk shows around the world, Chiarella has made television appearances on "E: Hollywood True Story" and "The TV Guide 2011 Preview of the Oscars." In 2008, he worked as a consultant for NBC on the development of a television show based on his life, tentatively titled "It's Tom, in Indiana" (not picked up for pilot). In summer of 2011, he worked as a Consulting Producer in the development of the new Rosie O'Donnell show, returning to Esquire at the close of that summer.

== Personal life ==
Chiarella lives in Greencastle, Indiana.

== Bibliography ==
=== Books ===
- Chiarella, Tom (1992). Foley's luck. Knopf.
- Writing Dialogue (Paperback), F & W Publications, January 1996, ISBN 978-1-884910-32-6
- Thursday's Game (Paperback), Emmis Books, 2004.

=== Essays and reporting ===
- Chiarella, Tom (January 2013). "Judd Apatow : 1999-2012 : on the occasion of This is 40". Esquire. 159 (1): 22.

== Shia LaBeouf ==
In 2013 it was revealed that actor Shia LaBeouf had plagiarized Chiarella's 2009 article "What is a Man?" in a public apology to Alec Baldwin.
