= Tommy Wallach =

American writer and musician (born 1982)

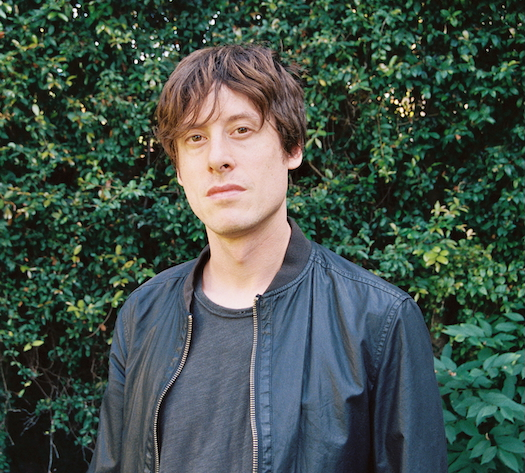
- Born: 1982 (age 43–44); Stamford, CT, U.S.
- Education: New York University, Stanford University
- Occupations: novelist; screenwriter; musician; game designer
- Years active: 2000–present
- Partner: Ellen Epley (2013–present)
- Website: www.tommywallach.com

Tommy Wallach is an American author, musician, screenwriter, and game designer.

Wallach is best known for his YA novel We All Looked Up, which spent over six months on the New York Times bestseller list. He is also the co-creator of The Murder of JonBenét Ramsey, starring Melissa McCarthy and Clive Owen, forthcoming on Netflix on December 10, 2026.

Wallach co-owns Hatch Escapes, an immersive experience and gaming company based in Los Angeles, which created The Ladder, winner of a 2025 THEA alongside The Sphere in Las Vegas, Tokyo DisneySea, and the Paris Olympics Opening Ceremony. He was also placed on the 2025 XLIST, recognizing innovators in experiential design.

In 2008, Wallach was signed to Decca Records, who released his self-titled EP. He has released two full-length albums independently, and has performed in such venues as the Guggenheim Museum and Joe's Pub.

His original musical Vicky & Frank, loosely based on Mary Shelley's Frankenstein, is currently in development for Broadway by 8-time Tony-Award-winning producer Joey Parnes.

== Early life ==
Wallach was born in Stamford, CT and raised in Bellevue, WA. His mother, Stephanie Wallach, was the 10th female commercial airline pilot in the United States. Wallach attended NYU Tisch, eventually graduating from the Gallatin School of Individualized Study, and received an MA in Journalism from Stanford University. As a youngster of 12, Wallach appeared as Jason in The Group Theater's 1995 and 1996 productions of Falsettos.

== Writing ==
Wallach's first published short story, "Breaker," appeared on McSweeney's Internet Tendency when he was only 18. He went on to publish short fiction and non-fiction in the print edition of McSweeney's, Tin House, Zyzzyva, Wired, ReadyMade, and various other places.

Wallach's first novel, We All Looked Up, was published in 2015 by Simon & Schuster Books for Young Readers. Sam Sinclair of School Librarian described "Wallach as "an interesting combination of writer and musician" whose debut novel "feels very different to the current crop of dystopian teen novels" and noted that the film rights had already been optioned by Paramount. It would spend a total of 26 weeks on the New York Times bestseller list and receive numerous accolades, including starred reviews in VOYA, Kirkus, School Library Journal, and Publishers Weekly and being chosen as a CBC Children's Book Award Finalist. It has since been published in over a dozen languages/territories.

Wallach's second novel, Thanks for the Trouble, was published in 2016. It was reviewed in the New York Times, which called its female protagonist "a sparkling creation, as mysterious as a mermaid," and said "at its best, the novel carries a worthy message: No life is without pain — or promise."

Wallach then published The Anchor & Sophia, a trilogy of books comprising Strange Fire, Slow Burn, and Scorched Earth.

In 2025, Wallach released Outer Wilds, an eponymous book-length study of the seminal 2019 video game developed by Mobius Digital and published by Annapurna Interactive. This monograph was an entry in the long-running Boss Fight Books series edited by Gabe Durham.

== Film & TV ==
Wallach is the co-creator of the forthcoming Netflix show The Murder of JonBenét Ramsey alongside Harrison Query and Richard LaGravenese. The show stars Clive Owen and Melissa McCarthy as John and Patsy Ramsey, parents of the tragically murdered JonBenet Ramsey. It co-stars Garrett Hedlund, Alison Pill, Shea Whigham, Owen Teague, Rory Cochrane, and Margo Martindale. LaGravenese acted as showrunner, and the pilot was directed by Anne Sewitsky. The series will premiere on December 10, 2026.

Wallach and Query sold the spec script Delilah to Screen Gems in 2021. Wallach was also tapped to do a production polish on the feature film Charlie 3D for Mandalay Pictures.

In 2023, the pilot for Wallach's comedy series PV & Franny was recorded as a podcast with Table Read Podcast. The episode starred Kensington Tallman, Ty Burrell, and Fred Armisen.

== Music ==
Throughout the aughts, Wallach posted original songs and videos on YouTube and DailyMotion. Combined, his videos have over half a million views. In 2008, Decca Records released Wallach's eponymous debut EP after he won Gather.com's "First Tracks" contest.

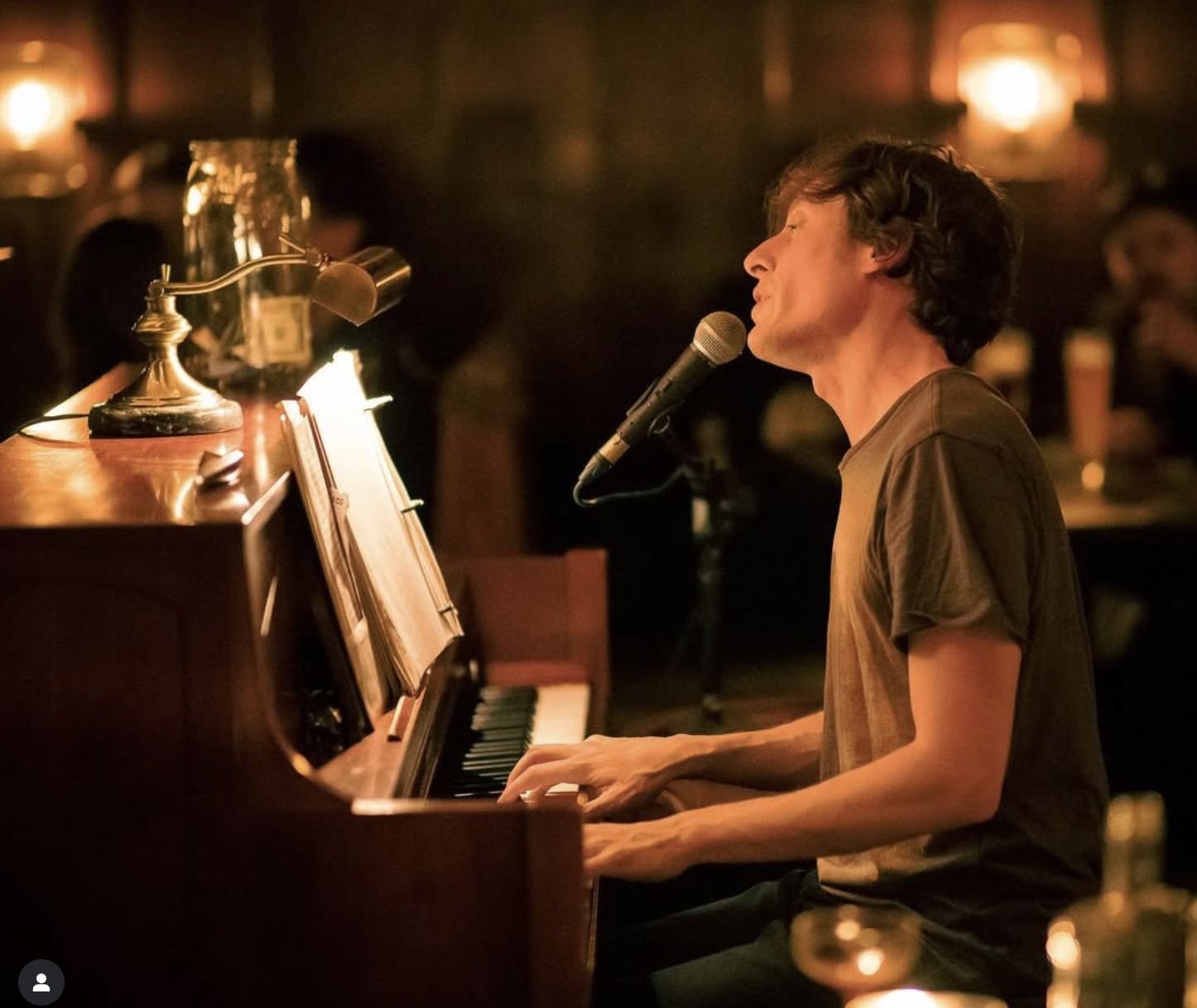
Wallach at the Varnish, 2023

In 2010, Wallach's original stop-motion video for his song "Whisper" (co-directed by Tallie Maughan) was shortlisted for the YouTube Play festival. As a result, Wallach was invited to perform at the Guggenheim Museum alongside OK Go and Michael Showalter. Glen Gamboa described the album for Newsday: "Newcomer Tommy Wallach clearly idolizes the gorgeous, clever piano-pop of Rufus Wainwright. The inspiration runs throughout his debut EP, "Tommy Wallach" (Decca)."

In 2014, he released the LP I Meant It To Be Sweet, produced by Giulio Carmassi (of the Pat Metheny Unity Group). Additional production was performed by Benjamin Lazar Davis (Okkervil River, Maya Hawke), and two tracks were recorded at Tiny Telephone Studios, where John Vanderslice provided additional keyboards.

In 2018, he released the LP We All Looked Up: The Album, a companion record to his debut novel of the same name. The record was produced by Benjamin Lazar Davis, and features additional strings from Joan Wasser (Joan as Police Woman).

Wallach was one of the house musicians at the legendary Los Angeles cocktail bar The Varnish from 2019 until its closing in 2024.

== Musicals ==
In September 2023, Wallach self-produced a reading for his original musical Vicky & Frank at Ripley-Grier Studios in New York City, starring Kuhoo Verma, Michael Thomas Grant, Julie James, Morgan Dudley, Asher Muldoon, Morgan Siobhan Green, and Jeremy Morse.

Vicky & Frank has been optioned for Broadway development by eight-time Tony Award winning producer Joey Parnes (A Gentleman's Guide to Love and Murder, The Humans, Bright Star). A second reading took place in 2024 at NYC's Open Jar Studios, and a workshop is planned for June 2026.

== Games and Escape Rooms ==
With Terry Pettigrew-Rolapp, Wallach is the co-founder of Hatch Escapes, a Los Angeles-based immersive experience and gaming company.

Hatch's first escape room, Lab Rat, opened in 2017. Lab Rat casts players as test subjects in a laboratory run by a giant rat doctoral student, Dr. Ratkenstein, who is doing his dissertation on human intelligence. The game was ranked the 8th best escape room in the world in 2018, and was also named the best escape room in Los Angeles by LA Magazine.

Hatch's second room, The Ladder, opened in April 2024 after extensive playtesting. The Ladder is a replayable 90-minute immersive experience offering a branching narrative, five playable avatars, and nine possible endings. Players spend 50 years climbing the corporate ladder at Nutricorp, a corrupt pharmaceutical company in Omaha, Nebraska. Each room of The Ladder represents a decade, from the 1950s through the 1990s, and features both traditional escape room puzzles and scored games. The Ladder has won numerous awards, including a THEA (given by the Themed Entertainment Association) and an Immie (the No Proscenium audience award).

With his Hatch co-owner Terry Pettigrew-Rolapp, Wallach also designed the tabletop game Mother of Frankenstein (2023), a 15-hour narrative puzzle game based on the life of Mary Shelley. Its Kickstarter campaign raised nearly $250,000 and received shout-outs from luminaries such as Neil Gaiman and Margaret Atwood. The game was eventually published by Arcane Wonders and made available in Barnes & Noble stores across the country.

== Published works ==
- Wallach, Tommy (2015). We All Looked Up, Simon & Schuster BFYR, ISBN 9781481418782
- Wallach, Tommy (2016). Thanks for the Trouble, Simon & Schuster BFYR, ISBN 9781481418812
- Wallach, Tommy (2017). Strange Fire, Simon & Schuster BFYR, ISBN 9781481468398
- Wallach, Tommy (2018). Slow Burn, Simon & Schuster BFYR, ISBN 9781481468428
- Wallach, Tommy (2020). Scorched Earth, Simon & Schuster BFYR, ISBN 9781481468466
- Wallach, Tommy (2025). Outer Wilds, Boss Fight Books, ISBN 978-1-940535-37-1
