= Rachell Sumpter =

American illustrator and artist

- Born: November 18, 1982 (age 43); Los Angeles
- Spouse: Jacob Magraw
- Awards: American Illustration; Communication Arts; Society of Illustrators Los Angeles Silver Medal; Art Directors Club; Print Magazine Award; AIGA

Rachell Sumpter (born November 18, 1982, in Los Angeles, California) is an internationally recognized illustrator and artist working in Seattle, Washington. A graduate of the Art Center College of Design, Sumpter's exhibitions have included solo exhibitions at the Richard Heller Gallery (Los Angeles), Hosfelt Gallery (New York City) Foley Gallery and Motel (Portland). Her work has also been showcased in group exhibitions at Jack Hanley Gallery (San Francisco), the Orange County Museum of Art and LACMA, among others. She used to work at a university in Seattle.

In addition to her exhibition work, Sumpter also maintains a commercial illustration practice. Her ongoing work with Dave Eggers and McSweeney's can be seen in the cover art for Zeitoun and What is the What. Her other clients include Chronicle Books, Penguin Books, Random House and the New York Times.
