= Frederick Barthelme =

American minimalist novelist and short story writer

Fredrick Barthelme
- Born: October 10, 1943 (age 82); Houston, Texas, U.S.
- Education: Johns Hopkins University
- Occupation: Novelist
- Relatives: Donald Barthelme (brother); Steven Barthelme (brother)

Fredrick Barthelme (born October 10, 1943) is an American novelist and short story writer of minimalist fiction. He is the director of the Center For Writers at The University of Southern Mississippi and editor of New World Writing (formerly Blip Magazine)

== Early life ==
Frederick Barthelme was born on October 10, 1943, in Houston, Texas. In the 1960s, he studied at University of St. Thomas, Tulane University, the University of Houston, the Houston Museum of Fine Arts and Johns Hopkins University.

== Career ==
Barthelme was a founding member of the Texan experimental rock band Red Krayola. In August 1967, he left the band to pursue writing and conceptual art in New York, working for a brief period as an assistant to the director of the Kornblee Gallery.

In November 1967, he showcased the conceptual art piece "untitled" at a New York art gallery and later several other pieces between 1968 and 1970, as well as some pieces in Art-Language, his works were later published in the book "Six Years: The Dematerialization of the Art Object".

His writing focuses on the landscape of the New South. Along with being a minimalist, his work has also been described as "dirty realism" and "Kmart realism". He published his first short story in The New Yorker.

Barthelme was the editor of Mississippi Review for three years. He is a teacher and the director of the Center For Writers at The University of Southern Mississippi and editor of New World Writing (formerly Blip Magazine).

== Personal life ==
His brothers Donald Barthelme and Steven Barthelme are also writers.

== Conceptual artwork ==
Year	Title	Medium	Publication / Exhibition
1967	Untitled	Tape	Six Years (1972, ed. Lucy R. Lippard)
November 1968	The Complex Figure-Ground Issue as Dealt with by the Young Artist David Frame	35-page booklet	Six Years
November 1968	The Flying Nabiscum	Bread and ink	Six Years
November 1968	Towels at Rest	Towels	Six Years
March 1969	(unnamed works)	Text	March 1–31, 1969 (1969, ed. Seth Siegelaub), Six Years
May 23, 1969	Determinization System 1: Physical phenomena have as their specific differentia spatial localization	Text	Art-Language Vol. 1 No. 2 (1970)
May 23, 1969	Determinization System 2: Psychical phenomena have as their specific differentia intentional structure	Text	Art-Language Vol. 1 No. 2 (1970)
May 23, 1969	Determinization System 3: Universal distillate	Text	Art-Language Vol. 1 No. 2 (1970)
1969	Instead of making any art I bought this television set	Television	557,087
Jan–Feb 1970	Two Works	Text	Six Years
February 6, 1970	Substitution 15	Text	Six Years
February 21, 1970	Substitution 24	Text	Conceptual Art (1972, ed. Ursula Meyer)
February 22, 1970	Substitution 25	Text	Conceptual Art (1972, ed. Ursula Meyer)

== Publications ==
=== Novels ===
- War and War, 1971.
- Second Marriage New York: Simon & Schuster, 1984.
- Tracer New York: Simon & Schuster, 1985.
- Two Against One New York: Weidenfeld & Nicolson, 1988.
- Natural Selection New York: Viking, 1989.
- The Brothers New York: Viking, 1993.
- Painted Desert New York: Viking, 1995.
- Bob the Gambler Boston: Houghton-Mifflin, 1997.
- Elroy Nights Cambridge: Counterpoint, 2003.
- Waveland New York: Doubleday, 2009.
- There Must Be Some Mistake New York: Little Brown, 2014.

=== Story collections ===
- Rangoon 1970.
- Moon Deluxe Simon & Schuster, 1983.
- Chroma Simon & Schuster, 1987.
- The Law of Averages: New & Selected Stories Counterpoint, 2000.
- "trip" (text) photographs by Susan Lipper Powerhouse Books, 1998.

=== Memoirs ===
- (With Steven Barthelme) Double Down: Reflections on Gambling and Loss. Boston: Houghton Mifflin, 1999.

=== Screenplays ===
- Second Marriage 1985.
- Tracer 1986.

== Awards ==
- 1976–77 Eliot Coleman Award for prose from Johns Hopkins University for his short story, "Storyteller"
- 1979, 1980 National Endowment for the Arts grant
- 2004 PEN/Faulkner Award for Fiction nomination for Elroy Nights
- 2010 Mississippi Institute of Arts and Letters fiction award for Waveland
