= Susan Lipper =

American photographer

Susan Lipper (born 1953) is an American photographer, based in New York City. Her books include the trilogy Grapevine (1994), Trip (2000) and Domesticated Land (2018). Lipper has said that all of her work is "subjective documentary".

Grapevine was shown in solo exhibitions at The Photographers' Gallery in London and Arnolfini in Bristol, UK in 1994. She received a Guggenheim Fellowship in 2015. Her work is held in the collections of the Metropolitan Museum of Art and New York Public Library in New York City, Minneapolis Institute of Art, Museum of Contemporary Art, Los Angeles, Museum of Fine Arts, Houston, and the National Portrait Gallery and Victoria and Albert Museum in London.

== Early life and education ==
Lipper was born and raised in New York City. She studied English Romantic poetry in college with a concentration on W. B. Yeats. She received an MFA in photography from Yale School of Art in 1983.

== Life and work ==
Lipper uses a medium format camera, sometimes with attached flash.

Her first book, Innocence & the Birth of Jealousy (1974), combines photography and poetry. According to David Solo writing in The PhotoBook Review, the book "offers a single, tightly integrated meditation on narcissism and its effects on relationships." Lipper appears in a set of dance-like poses, photographed by Penny Slinger, while Lipper was studying English literature in London. "When Lipper reviewed the contact sheets, the idea of the sequence/story emerged, and she wrote the accompanying narrative poem". The book was published by Martin Booth under his Omphalos imprint.

After returning to the United States, Lipper developed her more recognized style, as seen in the book trilogy Grapevine (1994), Trip (2004), and Domesticated Land (2018).

For about 20 years she has been visiting and photographing a tiny community in Grapevine Hollow in the Appalachian Mountains in West Virginia, eastern United States. The photographs she made there between 1988 and 1994, in collaboration with her subjects the residents, became Grapevine. The critic Gerry Badger has written that "Community, family, and gender relationships seem to be at the core of her investigation." Lipper's collaborative approach distinguishes Grapevine from social documentary photography; she describes it as "subjective documentary" and that "we were creating fictional images together [. . .] they knew the narratives I was playing around with as well as I did." Izabela Radwanska Zhang wrote in the British Journal of Photography that it "challenges our belief in images labelled 'photojournalism', by interweaving a theatrical element. Lipper asked her models to assume characters that could essentially be them in the images; the result is a slippery, mysterious work." Parr and Badger include Grapevine in the third volume of The Photobook: A History.

Trip, made between 1993 and 1999, paired road trip photographs of urban landscapes and interiors with writing by Frederick Barthelme. Domesticated Land was made between 2012 and 2016 in the California desert.

== Publications ==
=== Books of work by Lipper ===
- Innocence & the Birth of Jealousy. Rushden, UK: Omphalos, 1974.
- Grapevine: Photographs by Susan Lipper. Manchester, UK: Cornerhouse, 1994. ISBN 0-948797-13-4.
  - New York: powerHouse, 1997. ISBN 1576870235.
- Trip. Photographs by Lipper with accompanying short texts by Frederick Barthelme. With an afterword by Matthew Drutt.
  - Stockport, UK: Dewi Lewis, 2000. ISBN 1-899235-52-3.
  - Brooklyn, New York: powerHouse, 2000. ISBN 1576870510.
- Bed and Breakfast. Country life 4. Maidstone, UK: Photoworks, 2000. ISBN 9780951742730. Edited by Val Williams. With an essay by David Chandler. Edition of 1000 copies.
- Domesticated Land. London: Mack, 2018. ISBN 9781912339037.

=== Books with contributions by Lipper ===
- Who's Looking at the Family?. Manchester, UK: Cornerhouse, 1994. Edited by Val Williams. ISBN 978-0946372324.
- How We Are: Photographing Britain from the 1840s to the Present. Edited by Val Williams and Susan Bright. London: Tate, 2007. ISBN 978-1-85437-714-2.

== Exhibitions ==
=== Solo exhibitions ===
- Grapevine Hollow, The Photographers' Gallery, London, 1994
- Grapevine, Arnolfini, Bristol, UK, 1994
- Grapevine: Photographs by Susan Lipper, Cornerhouse, Manchester, UK, 1995

=== Group exhibitions ===
- Who's Looking at the Family, Barbican Centre, London, May–September 1994

== Awards ==
- 2015: Guggenheim Fellowship from the John Simon Guggenheim Memorial Foundation

== Collections ==
Lipper's work is held in the following permanent collections:

- Metropolitan Museum of Art, New York City: 2 prints (as of 11 April 2023)
- Minneapolis Institute of Art, Minneapolis, Minnesota: 1 print (as of 30 August 2021)
- Museum of Contemporary Art, Los Angeles: 5 prints (as of 11 April 2023)
- Museum of Fine Arts, Houston: 2 prints (as of 7 October 2024)
- National Portrait Gallery, London: 4 prints
- New York Public Library, New York City
- Victoria and Albert Museum, London: 7 prints (as of 30 August 2021)
