= Steven Barthelme =

American writer

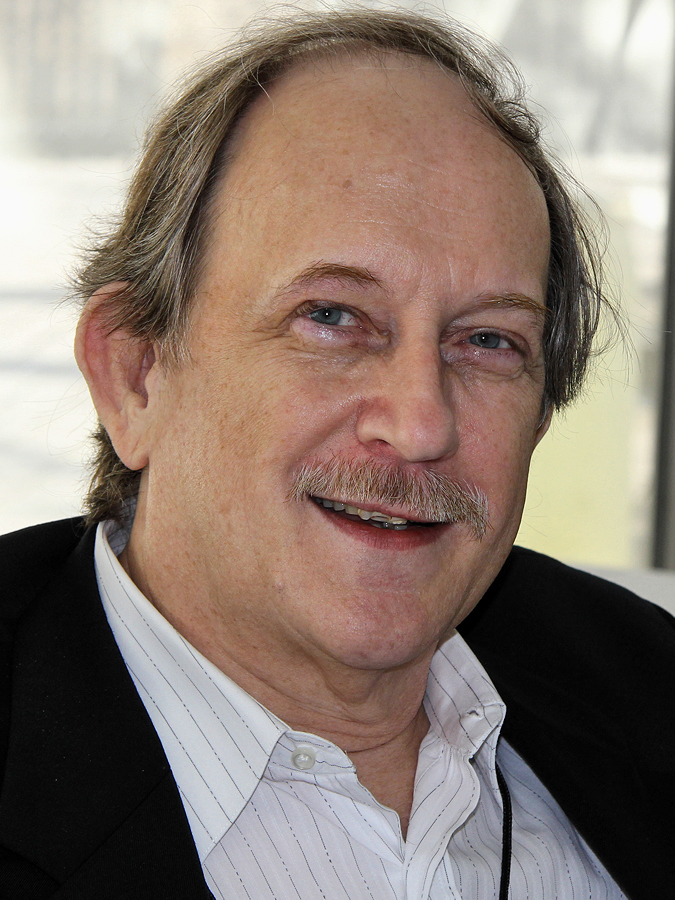
Steven Barthelme at the 2012 Texas Book Festival

Steven Barthelme (born 1947) is the author of numerous short stories and essays.

== Early life ==
He was born to Donald Barthelme Sr. and mother Helen Bechtold of Philadelphia who had four other children. His father was a modernist architect in Houston.

Steven Barthelme attended Johns Hopkins University. His brothers Donald Jr. and Frederick also became notable authors.

== Career ==
His published works include, And He Tells the Little Horse the Whole Story, Double Down: Reflections on Gambling and Loss (with brother Frederick Barthelme), and The Early Posthumous Work (essays which originally appeared in The New Yorker, New York Times, Oxford American, Elle Decor, and other publications).

Barthelme is said to write in a distinctive "post-Southern" style.

He is the former director of The Center for Writers at the University of Southern Mississippi.

== Awards ==
He won Pushcart Prizes in 1993 and 2005, and in 2004 he won the Texas Institute of Letters Short Story Award for work published in Yale Review.

== Bibliography ==
=== Collections ===
- And He Tells the Little Horse the Whole Story. Johns Hopkins, 1987.
- The Early Posthumous Work. Red Hen Press, 2010.
- Hush Hush: Stories. Melville House, 2012.

=== Nonfiction ===
- "White Guy," Brevity, 2011.
- "Talent and Fifty Cents," Essay Daily, 2014
- Double Down: Reflections on Gambling and Loss (with Frederick Barthelme). Houghton Mifflin, 1999.

== Awards ==
- Pushcart Prize, short story, "Claire," from Yale Review, 2005
- Listed in "100 Distinguished Short Stories" Best American Short Stories 2004, 2004
- Texas Institute of Letters, Short Story Award. "Claire," 2004
- Mississippi Arts Commission Artist's Fellowship, Fiction, 2000
- Texas Institute of Letters, O. Henry Award for Magazine Journalism, "Good Losers" [from The New Yorker, co-authored with Frederick Barthelme], 2000
