= Susan Steinberg (author) =

American writer

Susan Steinberg is an American writer. She is the author of the short story collections The End of Free Love (FC2, 2003), Hydroplane (University of Alabama Press, 2006) and Spectacle (Graywolf Press, 2013). Her first novel Machine: A Novel (Graywolf, 2019), revolving around a group of teenagers during a single summer at the shore, employs experimental language and structure to interrogate gender, class, privilege, and the disintegration of identity in the shadow of trauma.

== Life ==
Steinberg holds a B.F.A. in Painting from Maryland Institute College of Art and an M.F.A. in English from the University of Massachusetts Amherst. She teaches English at the University of San Francisco. She was a fiction editor at Pleiades from 2000 until 2006.

== Awards ==
Susan Steinberg was the recipient of a 2012 Pushcart Prize for her short story "Cowboys." She was a James Merrill House Fellow in 2015.

== Reviews ==
Publishers Weekly gave Machine a starred review, praising her "use of meter and line".

About Machine, Ann Hulbert commended in The Atlantic Steinberg's "daring experiments with style and perspective".

In the Los Angeles Review of Books, Andrew Schenker lauded the stylistic diversity of the chapters in Machine and the stylistic "tension between motion and stasis" in Spectacle.

== Writing ==
- Machine: A Novel (Graywolf Press, 2019)
- Spectacle (Graywolf, 2013)
- "Spectacle," Conjunctions (2011)
- Hydroplane (University of Alabama Press, 2006)
- The End of Free Love (FC2, 2003)
