= Marcy Dermansky =

American author and editor

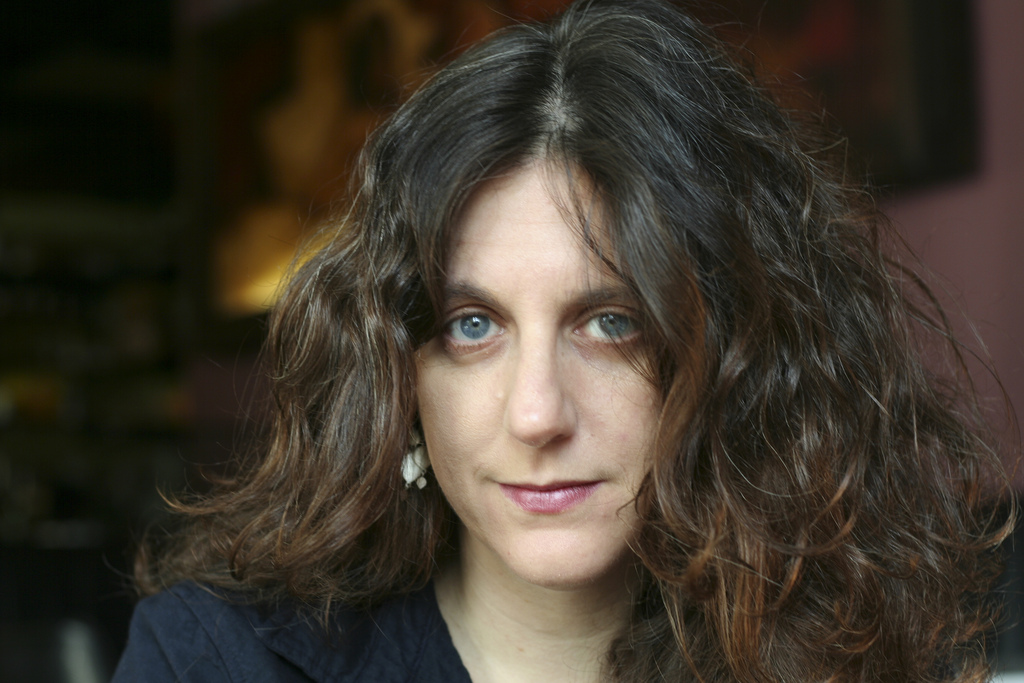
- Marcy Dermansky
- Born: 1969 (age 56–57); United States
- Occupation: Author
- Writing career
- Pen name: Marcy Dermansky
- Period: 2005–present
- Notable work: The Red Car
- Website: marcydermansky.com

Marcy Dermansky (born 1969) is an American author and editor. Her debut novel Twins was published in 2005 by William Morrow. Bad Marie, her second novel, was published in 2010 by Harper Perennial. Her third novel The Red Car was published by Liveright in 2016. The book was named a Best Book of the Year by BuzzFeed, the San Francisco Chronicle, Flavorwire, and The Huffington Post. It was a New York Times Editors' Choice Pick. Her fourth novel, Very Nice, was published on July 2, 2019, by Knopf. Her fifth novel, the thriller Hurricane Girl, was published on June 14, 2022, by Penguin Random House.

Dermansky received fellowships from MacDowell and the Edward Albee Ranch. She is the winner of the 2002 Smallmouth Press Andre Dubus Novella Award, and the 1999 Story Magazine Carson McCullers short story prize. Her stories have been published in numerous literary journals, including McSweeney's, The Alaska Quarterly Review, and The Indiana Review, and included in the anthology Goodbye to All That: Writers On Loving And Leaving New York and Love Stories: A Literary Companion to Tennis.

== Bibliography ==
- Twins. William Morrow and Company. 2005.
- Bad Marie. Harper Perennial. 2010.
- The Red Car. Boni & Liveright. 2017.
- Very Nice. Alfred A. Knopf. 2019.
- Hurricane Girl. Knopf. 2022.
- Hot Air. Knopf. 2025.
