= Donald Barthelme =

American writer and professor (1931 – 1989)

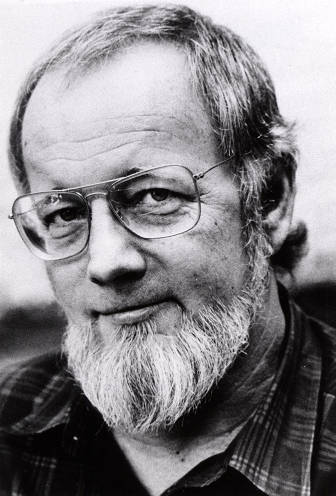
- Born: Donald Barthelme Jr. April 7, 1931; Philadelphia, Pennsylvania, US
- Died: July 23, 1989 (aged 58); Houston, Texas, US
- Education: University of Houston
- Occupations: Writer, professor
- Relatives: Donald Barthelme Sr. Frederick Barthelme; Steven Barthelme
- Writing career
- Period: 1961–1989
- Genre: Short story
- Movement: Postmodern literature

Donald Barthelme Jr. (pronounced BAR-thəl-mee; April 7, 1931 – July 23, 1989) was an American short story writer and novelist known for his playful, postmodernist style of short fiction. Barthelme also worked as a newspaper reporter for the Houston Post, was managing editor of Location magazine, director of the Contemporary Arts Museum in Houston (1961–1962), co-founder of Fiction (with Mark Mirsky and the assistance of Max and Marianne Frisch), and a professor at various universities. He also was one of the original founders of the University of Houston Creative Writing Program.

== Early life ==
Donald Barthelme was born in Philadelphia in 1931. His father and mother were fellow students at the University of Pennsylvania. The family moved to Texas two years later and Barthelme's father became a professor of architecture at the University of Houston, where Barthelme would later study journalism. Barthelme won a Scholastic Writing Award in Short Story in 1949, while a student at Lamar High School in Houston. (Barthelme also attended St. Thomas Catholic High School in Houston.)

In 1951, as a student, he wrote his first articles for the Houston Post. Two years later, Barthelme was drafted into the U.S. Army, arriving in Korea on July 27, 1953, the day of the signing of the Korean Armistice Agreement, which ended the Korean War. Assigned to the 2nd Infantry Division, he served briefly as the editor of an Army newspaper and the Public Information Office of the Eighth Army before returning to the United States and his job at the Houston Post.

At that time, he continued his studies at the University of Houston studying philosophy and founded a literary journal called Forum, which published many future "big names" including Norman Mailer, Walker Percy, Marshall McLuhan, and William H. Gass. Although Barthelme continued to take classes until 1957, he never received a degree. He spent much of his free time in Houston's Black jazz clubs, listening to musical innovators such as Lionel Hampton and Peck Kelley, an experience that influenced his later writing.

== Career ==
Barthelme went on to teach for brief periods at Boston University, University at Buffalo, and the City College of New York, where he served as distinguished visiting professor from 1974 to 1975.

=== Writing ===
In 1961 he became director of the Contemporary Arts Museum Houston; he published his first short story the same year. His New Yorker publication, "L'Lapse", a parody of Michelangelo Antonioni's film L'Eclisse (The Eclipse), followed in 1963. The magazine would go on to publish much of Barthelme's early output, including such now-famous stories as "Me and Miss Mandible", the tale of a 35-year-old sent to elementary school by either a clerical error, failing at his job as an insurance adjuster, or failing in his marriage. Written in October 1960, it was the first of his stories to be published. "A Shower of Gold", another early short story, portrays a sculptor who agrees to appear on the existentialist game show Who Am I? In 1964, Barthelme collected his early stories in Come Back, Dr. Caligari, for which he received considerable critical acclaim as an innovator of the short story form. His style—fictional and popular figures in absurd situations, e.g., the Batman-inspired "The Joker's Greatest Triumph" (Note: A parody of a comic book story with the same name, written by Bill Finger, penciled by Sheldon Moldoff, and inked by Charles Paris, published in Batman #148 (DC Comics, June 1962).)—spawned a number of imitators and helped to define the next several decades of short fiction.

Barthelme continued his success in the short story form with Unspeakable Practices, Unnatural Acts (1968). One widely anthologized story from this collection, "The Balloon", appears to reflect on Barthelme's intentions as an artist. The narrator inflates a giant, irregular balloon over most of Manhattan, causing widely divergent reactions in the populace. Children play across its top, enjoying it literally on a surface level; adults attempt to read meaning into it but are baffled by its ever-changing shape; the authorities attempt to destroy it but fail. In the final paragraph, the reader learns that the narrator has inflated the balloon for purely personal reasons, and he sees no intrinsic meaning in the balloon itself. Other notable stories from this collection include "The Indian Uprising", a mad collage of a Comanche attack on a modern city, and "Robert Kennedy Saved From Drowning", a series of vignettes showing the difficulties of truly knowing a public figure. The latter story appeared in print only two months before Robert F. Kennedy's 1968 assassination.

Barthelme went on to write over a hundred more short stories, first collected in City Life (1970), Sadness (1972), Amateurs (1976), Great Days (1979), and Overnight to Many Distant Cities (1983). Many of these stories were later reprinted and slightly revised for the collections Sixty Stories (1981), Forty Stories (1987), and posthumously, Flying to America (2007). Though primarily known for these stories, Barthelme also produced four novels: Snow White (1967), The Dead Father (1975), Paradise (1986), and The King (1990, posthumous).

Barthelme also wrote the non-fiction book Guilty Pleasures (1974). His other writings have been posthumously gathered into two collections, The Teachings of Don B.: Satires, Parodies, Fables, Illustrated Stories, and Plays of Donald Barthelme (1992) and Not-Knowing: The Essays and Interviews (1997). With his daughter, he wrote the children's book The Slightly Irregular Fire Engine, which received the 1972 National Book Award in category Children's Books. He was also a director of PEN, the Authors Guild, and a member of the American Academy and Institute of Arts and Letters.

== Personal life ==
Barthelme's relationship with his father was a struggle between a rebellious son and a demanding father. In later years they had tremendous arguments about the kinds of literature in which Barthelme was interested and which he wrote. While in many ways his father was avant-garde in art and aesthetics, he did not approve of the postmodern and deconstruction schools.

His brothers Frederick (born 1943) and Steven (born 1947) are also respected fiction writers.

He married four times. His second wife, Helen Moore Barthelme, later wrote a biography entitled Donald Barthelme: The Genesis of a Cool Sound, published in 2001. With his third wife Birgit, a Dane, he had his first child, a daughter named Anne, and near the end of his life, he married Marion Knox Barthelme, with whom he had his second daughter, Katharine. Marion and Donald remained married until his death in 1989. Marion died in 2011.

== Death ==
Barthelme died of throat cancer in 1989.

== Style and legacy ==
Barthelme's fiction was hailed by some for being profoundly disciplined and derided by others as being meaningless, academic postmodernism. Barthelme's thoughts and work were largely the result of 20th-century angst as he read extensively, for example in Pascal, Husserl, Heidegger, Kierkegaard, Ionesco, Beckett, Sartre, and Camus.

Barthelme's stories typically avoid traditional plot structures, relying instead on a steady accumulation of seemingly unrelated detail. By subverting the reader's expectations through constant non-sequiturs, Barthelme creates a fragmented verbal collage reminiscent of such modernist works as T. S. Eliot's The Waste Land and James Joyce's Ulysses, whose linguistic experiments he often challenged. However, Barthelme's fundamental skepticism and irony distanced him from the modernists' belief in the power of art to reconstruct society, leading most critics to class him as a postmodernist writer. Literary critics have noted that Barthelme, like Stéphane Mallarmé, whom he admired, plays with the meanings of words, relying on poetic intuition to spark new connections of ideas buried in the expressions and conventional responses. The critic George Wicks called Barthelme "the leading American practitioner of surrealism today... whose fiction continues the investigations of consciousness and experiments in expression that began with Dada and surrealism a half-century ago." Another critic, Jacob M. Appel, described him as "the most influential unread author in United States history".

The great bulk of his work was published in The New Yorker (where fiction editor Roger Angell was his champion). In 1964, he began to publish short-story collections beginning with Come Back, Dr. Caligari in 1964, followed by Unspeakable Practices, Unnatural Acts (1968) and City Life (1970). Time magazine named City Life one of the best books of the year and described the collection as written with "Kafka's purity of language and some of Beckett's grim humor". His formal originality can be seen in his fresh handling of the parodic dramatic monologue in "The School" or a list of one hundred numbered sentences and fragments in "The Glass Mountain". Joyce Carol Oates commented on this sense of fragmentation in "Whose Side Are You On?", a 1972 New York Times Book Review essay. She writes, "This from a writer of arguable genius whose works reflect what he himself must feel, in book after book, that his brain is all fragments... just like everything else." Perhaps, the most discrete reference to this fragment comes from "See the Moon?" from Unspeakable Practices. The narrator states and repeats the phrase, "Fragments are the only forms I trust." It is important, however, to not conflate the quote's sentiment with Barthelme's personal philosophy, as he expressed irritation over the "fragments" quote being attributed so frequently to him rather than his narrator.

Another Barthelme device was breaking up a tale with illustrations culled from mostly popular 19th-century publications, collaged, and appended with ironic captions. Barthelme called his cutting up and pasting together pictures "a secret vice gone public". One of the pieces in the collection Guilty Pleasures, "The Expedition", featured a full-page illustration of a collision between ships, with the caption "Not our fault!"

At the University of Houston, Barthelme was one of the founders of the prestigious Creative Writing Program. He became known as a sensitive, creative, and encouraging mentor to young creative writing students even as he continued his own writings. Thomas Cobb, one of his students, published his doctoral dissertation Crazy Heart in 1987 partly basing the main character on Barthelme. (Note: The novel was made into the successful 2009 film Crazy Heart)

== Influences ==
In a 1971–1972 interview with Jerome Klinkowitz (now collected in Not-Knowing), Barthelme provides a list of favorite writers, both influential figures from the past and contemporary writers he admired. Throughout other interviews in the same collection, Barthelme reiterates a number of the same names and also mentions several others, occasionally expanding on why these writers were important for him. In a 1975 interview for Pacifica Radio, Barthelme stresses that, for him, Beckett is foremost among his literary predecessors, saying, "I'm enormously impressed by Beckett. I'm just overwhelmed by Beckett, as Beckett was, I speculate, by Joyce". What follows is a partial list gleaned from the interviews.

- François Rabelais
- Arthur Rimbaud
- Heinrich von Kleist
- Franz Kafka
- Gertrude Stein
- Flann O'Brien
- Samuel Beckett
- William H. Gass
- Rafael Sabatini
- S. J. Perelman
- Ann Beattie
- Walker Percy
- Gabriel García Márquez
- John Barth
- Thomas Pynchon
- Kenneth Koch
- John Ashbery
- Grace Paley
- Machado de Assis

Barthelme was also quite interested in and influenced by a number of contemporary artists, particularly the "found object" collage techniques of Robert Rauschenberg.

== Selected works ==
=== Story collections ===
- Come Back, Dr. Caligari – Little, Brown, 1964
- Unspeakable Practices, Unnatural Acts – Farrar, Straus and Giroux, 1968
- City Life – Farrar, Straus and Giroux, 1970
- Sadness – Farrar, Straus and Giroux, 1972
- Amateurs – Farrar, Straus and Giroux, 1976
- Great Days – Farrar, Straus and Giroux, 1979
- Overnight to Many Distant Cities – Putnam, 1983
- Sam's Bar (with illustrations by Seymour Chwast) – Doubleday, 1987
- Sixty Stories – Putnam, 1981
- Forty Stories – Putnam, 1987
- Flying to America: 45 More Stories – Shoemaker & Hoard, 2007
- Donald Barthelme: Collected Stories (Edited By Charles McGrath) – Library Of America, 2021

=== Non-fiction ===
- Guilty Pleasures (non-fiction) – Farrar, Straus and Giroux, 1974

=== Novels ===
- Snow White – Atheneum Books, 1967
- The Dead Father – Farrar, Straus and Giroux, 1975
- Paradise – Putnam, 1986
- The King – Harper, 1990

=== Other ===
- A Manual for Sons (excerpted from The Dead Father, with an afterword by Rick Moody)
- The Teachings of Don B.: Satires, Parodies, Fables, Illustrated Stories, and Plays of Donald Barthelme, edited by Kim Herzinger – Turtle Bay Books, 1992
- Not-Knowing: The Essays and Interviews of Donald Barthelme, edited by Kim Herzinger – Random House, 1997
- The Slightly Irregular Fire Engine or The Hithering Thithering Djinn (children's book), Farrar, Straus, 1971

== Awards ==
- 1966 Guggenheim Fellowship
- 1971 Time magazine Best Books of the Year list, for City Life
- 1972 National Book Award, Children's Books, for The Slightly Irregular Fire Engine or the Hithering Thithering Djinn
- 1972 Morton Dauwen Zabel Award from the National Institute of Arts and Letters
- 1976 Jesse H Jones Award from Texas Institute of Letters, for The Dead Father
- 1982:
  - (nomination) National Book Critics Circle Award for Sixty Stories
  - PEN/Faulkner Award for Fiction, Los Angeles Times Book Prize for Sixty Stories
- 1988 Rea Award for the Short Story
