= The Best American Short Stories 1980 =

1980 book

- Editor: Shannon Ravenel and Stanley Elkin
- Language: English
- Series: The Best American Short Stories
- Publisher: Houghton Mifflin Harcourt
- Media type: Print (hardback & paperback)
- ISBN: 978-0395294468
- Preceded by: The Best American Short Stories 1979
- Followed by: The Best American Short Stories 1981

The Best American Short Stories 1980, a volume in The Best American Short Stories series, was edited by Shannon Ravenel and by guest editor Stanley Elkin. The volume was published by Houghton Mifflin Harcourt.

== Background ==
The series is considered one of the "best-known annual anthologies of short fiction" and has anthologized more than 2,000 short stories, including works by some of the most famous writers in contemporary American literature, curated by well-known guest editors since 1915. Specifically, Amy Hempel considered it and the O. Henry Award's prize anthology to compile "the best short fiction published in American and Canadian magazines during the preceding year."

In particular, the Willa Cather Review wrote that The Best American Short Stories series "became a repository of values" for creative writing programs and literary magazines, specifically with considerable "influence" in college libraries, short fiction courses, and fiction workshops.

== Critical reception ==
Kirkus Reviews observed that the "fairly uneven" curation matched Stanley Elkin's own interests sought in his writing, namely stories that are "longish, comically operatic, frequently about Jews or the momentarily possessed," though found two standout inclusions: "The Old Forest" by Peter Taylor and "The One-Star Jew" by David Evanier.

== Short stories included ==
Author	Story	Source
Donald Barthelme	"The Emerald"	Esquire
Frederick Busch	"Long Calls"	North American Review
David Evanier	"The One-Star Jew"	The Paris Review
Mavis Gallant	"The Remission"	The New Yorker
Mavis Gallant	"Speck's Idea"	The New Yorker
William H. Gass	"The Old Folks"	The Kenyon Review
T. Gertler	"In Case of Survival"	Esquire Fortnightly
Elizabeth Hardwick	"The Faithful"	The New Yorker
Larry Heinemann	"The a First Clean Fact"	TriQuarterly
Robert Henderson	"Into the Wind"	The New Yorker
Curt Johnson	"Lemon Tree"	Confrontation
Grace Paley	"Friends"	The New Yorker
James Robison	"Home "	The New Yorker
Leon Rooke	"Mama Tuddi Done Over"	Descant
John Sayles	"At The Anarchists' Convention"	The Atlantic Monthly
Isaac Bashevis Singer	"The Safe Deposit"	The New Yorker
Richard Stern	"Dr. Cahn's Visit"	The Atlantic Monthly
Barry Targan	"The Rags of Time "	Southwest Review
Peter Taylor	"The Old Forest"	The New Yorker
John Updike	"Gesturing"	Playboy
Norman Waksler	"Markowitz and the Gypsies"	Ascent
Gordon Weaver	"Hog's Heart"	The Antioch Review
