= The Best American Short Stories 1978 =

1978 book

- Editor: Shannon Ravenel and Theodore Solotaroff
- Language: English
- Series: The Best American Short Stories
- Publisher: Houghton Mifflin Harcourt
- Media type: Print (hardback & paperback)
- ISBN: 978-0395271049
- Preceded by: The Best American Short Stories 1977
- Followed by: The Best American Short Stories 1979

The Best American Short Stories 1978, a volume in The Best American Short Stories series, was edited by Shannon Ravenel and by guest editor Theodore Solotaroff. The volume was published by Houghton Mifflin Harcourt.

== Background ==
The series is considered one of the "best-known annual anthologies of short fiction" and has anthologized more than 2,000 short stories, including works by some of the most famous writers in contemporary American literature, curated by well-known guest editors since 1915. Specifically, Amy Hempel considered it and the O. Henry Award's prize anthology to compile "the best short fiction published in American and Canadian magazines during the preceding year."

In particular, the Willa Cather Review wrote that The Best American Short Stories series "became a repository of values" for creative writing programs and literary magazines, specifically with considerable "influence" in college libraries, short fiction courses, and fiction workshops.

== Short stories included ==
Author	Story	Source
Leslie Epstein	"Skaters on Wood"	Esquire
Joyce Carol Oates	"The Translation"	TriQuarterly
Elizabeth Cullinan	"A Good Loser"	The New Yorker
Harold Brodkey	"Verona: A Young Woman Speaks"	Esquire
Mark Helprin	"The Schreuderspitze"	The New Yorker
Peter Taylor	"In the Miro District"	The New Yorker
Robert T. Sorrells	"The Blacktop Champion of Ickey Honey"	American Review
Natalie L. M. Petesch	"Main Street Morning"	New Letters
Max Schott	"Murphy Jones: Pearblossom, California"	Ascent
Ian McEwan	"Psychopolis"	American Review
Peter Marsh	"By the Yellow Lake"	The New Yorker
Stanley Elkin	"The Conventional Wisdom"	American Review
John Gardner	"Redemption"	The Atlantic
Lynne Sharon Schwartz	"Rough Strife"	The Ontario Review
Tim McCarthy	"The Windmill Man"	The Colorado Quarterly
L. Hluchan Sintetos	"Telling the Bees"	Prairie Schooner
Joy Williams	"Bromeliads"	The Cornell Review
Jane Bowles	"Two Scenes"	Antaeus
Gilbert Sorrentino	"Decades"	Esquire
James Kaplan	"In Miami, Last Winter"	Esquire
Jonathan Baumbach	"The Return of Service"	American Review
Mary Ann Malinchak Rishel	"Staus"	The Hudson Review
