= The Best American Short Stories 1982 =

1982 book

- Editor: Shannon Ravenel and John Gardner
- Language: English
- Series: The Best American Short Stories
- Publisher: Houghton Mifflin Harcourt
- Media type: Print (hardback & paperback)
- ISBN: 978-0395322079
- Preceded by: The Best American Short Stories 1981
- Followed by: The Best American Short Stories 1983

The Best American Short Stories 1982, a volume in The Best American Short Stories series, was edited by Shannon Ravenel and by guest editor John Gardner. The volume was published by Houghton Mifflin Harcourt.

== Background ==
The series is considered one of the "best-known annual anthologies of short fiction" and has anthologized more than 2,000 short stories, including works by some of the most famous writers in contemporary American literature, curated by well-known guest editors since 1915. Specifically, Amy Hempel considered it and the O. Henry Award's prize anthology to compile "the best short fiction published in American and Canadian magazines during the preceding year."

In particular, the Willa Cather Review wrote that The Best American Short Stories series "became a repository of values" for creative writing programs and literary magazines, specifically with considerable "influence" in college libraries, short fiction courses, and fiction workshops.

== Critical reception ==
Kirkus Reviews called John Gardner's curation a death blow to the "Foley legacy" that had previously marked the anthology series. The reviewer concluded that "As a sampling of what moral-crusader Gardner likes in short-story fiction, then, this is certainly informative. But it's hardly a fair reflection of the year's best—and perhaps this series should take on a new title if such unbalanced collections are to be expected in the future."

Le Anne Schreiber, writing in The New York Times, lauded Gardner for "a collection that demonstrates the variety and vigor of American short-story writing far better than any comparable collection in recent years."

== Short stories included ==
Author	Story	Source
Raymond Carver	"Cathedral"	The Atlantic Monthly
James Ferry	"Dancing Ducks and Talking Anus"	The Literary Review
Joanna Higgins	"The Courtship of Widow Sobcek"	MSS
William Hauptman	"Good Rockin' Tonight"	Playboy
Fred Licht	"Shelter the Pilgrim"	The Hudson Review
Mary Robison	"Coach"	The New Yorker
Charles Johnson	"Exchange Value"	Choice
Nicholson Baker	"K. 590"	The Little Magazine
Joyce Renwick	"The Dolphin Story"	Choice
Lissa Maclaughlin	"The Continental Heart"	The Massachusetts Review
Alvin Greenberg	"The Power of Language is Such That Even a Single Word Taken Truly to Heart Can Change Everything"	StoryQuarterly
Roberta Gupta	"The Cafe de Paris "	MSS
R. E. Smith	"The Gift Horse's Mouth"	The Texas Review
Charles Baxter	"Harmony of the World"	The Michigan Quarterly Review
Edith Milton	"Coming Over"	The Yale Review
Anne Hobson Freeman	"The Girl Who Was No Kin to the Marshalls"	Virginia Quarterly Review
Anne F. Rosner	"Prize Tomatoes"	TriQuarterly
Ian MacMillan	"Proud Monster—Sketches"	The Carolina Quarterly
Rosanne Coggeshall	"Lamb Says"	The South Carolina Review
Joyce Carol Oates	"Theft"	The Northwest Review
