= The Best American Short Stories 1981 =

1981 book

- Editor: Shannon Ravenel and Hortense Calisher
- Language: English
- Series: The Best American Short Stories
- Publisher: Houghton Mifflin Harcourt
- Media type: Print (hardback & paperback)
- ISBN: 978-0395312599
- Preceded by: The Best American Short Stories 1980
- Followed by: The Best American Short Stories 1982

The Best American Short Stories 1981, a volume in The Best American Short Stories series, was edited by Shannon Ravenel and by guest editor Hortense Calisher. The volume was published by Houghton Mifflin Harcourt.

== Background ==
The series is considered one of the "best-known annual anthologies of short fiction" and has anthologized more than 2,000 short stories, including works by some of the most famous writers in contemporary American literature, curated by well-known guest editors since 1915. Specifically, Amy Hempel considered it and the O. Henry Award's prize anthology to compile "the best short fiction published in American and Canadian magazines during the preceding year."

In particular, the Willa Cather Review wrote that The Best American Short Stories series "became a repository of values" for creative writing programs and literary magazines, specifically with considerable "influence" in college libraries, short fiction courses, and fiction workshops.

== Critical reception ==
Kirkus Reviews called the anthology "the weakest in years" due to Hortense Calisher's "safe" approach to curation lying in "many big-name authors and New Yorker contributors," ultimately leading to unusually weak inclusions by legendary writers: "Only five stories out of the 20 here, in fact, seem genuinely outstanding... Very few standouts, much inferior, unflattering work: a definite dip in quality and authority for this usually-solid series."

== Short stories included ==
Author	Story	Source
Walter Abish	"The Idea of Switzerland"	Partisan Review
Max Apple	"Small Island Republics"	Kenyon Review
Ann Beattie	"Winter: 1978"	Carolina Quarterly
Robert Coover	"A Working Day"	The Iowa Review
Vincent G. Dethier	"The Moth and the Primrose"	The Massachusetts Review
Andre Dubus	"The Winter Father"	The Sewanee Review
Mavis Gallant	"The Assembly"	Harper's
Elizabeth Hardwick	"The Bookseller"	The New Yorker
Bobbie Ann Mason	"Shiloh"	The New Yorker
Joseph McElroy	"The Future"	The New Yorker
Elizabeth McGrath	"Fogbound in Avalon"	The New Yorker
Amelia Moseley	"The Mountains Where Cithaeron Is"	The Massachusetts Review
Alice Munro	"Wood"	The New Yorker
Joyce Carol Oates	"Presque Isle"	The Agni Review
Cynthia Ozick	"The Shawl"	The New Yorker
Louis D. Rubin, Jr.	"The St. Anthony Chorale"	The Southern Review
Richard Stern	"Wissler Remembers"	The Atlantic Monthly
Elizabeth Tallent	"Ice"	The New Yorker
John Updike	"Still of Some Use"	The New Yorker
Larry Woiwode	"Change"	The New Yorker
