= The Norton Anthology of Contemporary Fiction =

Literature anthology

- Editor: R. V. Cassill
- Language: English
- Genre: Anthology, English literature
- Published: 1988; 1998
- Publisher: W. W. Norton & Company
- Publication place: United States

The Norton Anthology of Contemporary Fiction, published by W. W. Norton & Company, is one of the Norton Anthology series for use in English literary studies. The first edition appeared in 1988 and was accompanied by an "Instructor's Handbook". The second edition appeared in 1998 and was edited by R. V. Cassill and, in addition, by Joyce Carol Oates. It has been widely used as a college textbook. The 545-page anthology contains one work each by 45 writers, 41 of whom were born in the United States. The second edition contains 16 new writers. The selection includes 21 women writers. A biographical sketch of each author is included at the end of the volume.

In his introduction to the second and last edition with this title, Cassill cites the influence of urbanization and network journalism on aspiring writers at the end of the 20th century before asserting that the "range of private experience in this collection ought to encourage students to look into their own school and neighborhood experience when and if they are moved to write"; he notes the intention of the volume to be that students will find "much to emulate, and class discussions of contemporary styles will be relevant in all literature courses." R. V. Cassill was a prolific writer, teacher of creative writing, and professor at Boston University from 1966 to 1983. From 1978 until his death in 2002, Cassill was also the editor of the Norton Anthology of Short Fiction. The writer Joyce Carol Oates has been the editor of a wide range of anthologies since 1973.

== Included authors (second edition) ==
Author	Title	Date of Copyright	Source
Alice Adams	"Barcelona"	1984	Return Trips
Julia Alvarez	"The Rudy Elmenhurst Story"	1991	How the Garcia Girls Lost Their Accents
Margaret Atwood	"The Man from Mars"	1977, 1981	Dancing Girls and Other Stories
Donald Barthelme	"The Indian Uprising"	1981	Unspeakable Practices. Unnatural Acts
Charles Baxter	"Snow"	1990	A Relative Stranger
Ann Beattie	"The Cinderella Waltz"	1982	The Burning House
T. Coraghessan Boyle	"Descent of Man"	1974	Descent of Man
Ron Carlson	"Blazo”	1992	Plan B for the Middle Class
Raymond Carver	"Cathedral"	1981	Cathedral
Sandra Cisneros	"One Holy Night"	1991	Woman Hollering Creek
Robert Coover	"The Babysitter"	1969	Pricksongs and Descants
Mark Costello	"Murphy's Xmas"	1973	The Murphy Stories
Andre Dubus	"A Father's Story"	1983	The Times Are Never So Bad
Stuart Dybek	"Pet Milk "	1981	The Coast of Chicago
Louise Erdrich	"Saint Marie"	1984; revised 1993	Atlantic Monthly (March 1984)
Richard Ford	"Rock Springs"	1987	Rock Springs
Gabriel García Márquez	"A Very Old Man with Enormous Wings"	1971	Leaf Storm and Other Stories
George Garrett	"An Evening Performance"	1985	An Evening Performance
William H. Gass	"In the Heart of the Heart of the Country"	1968	In the Heart of the Heart of the Country
C. S. Godshalk	"The Wizard"	1989	appeared in AGNI 28
Tom Hawkins	“Putting a Child to Bed”	1989	Paper Crown
Amy Hempel	"In the Cemetery Where Al Jolson Is Buried"	1985	Reasons to Live
Pam Houston	"Cowboys Are My Weakness"	1992	Cowboys Are My Weakness
Charles Johnson	"Kwoon"	1991	first appeared in Playboy, December 1991
Thom Jones	"The Black Lights"	1993	The Pugilist at Rest
Jamaica Kincaid	"Girl"	1983	At the Bottom of the River
William Kotzwinkle	"Follow the Eagle"	1971	Elephant Bangs Train
Ursula K. Le Guin	"The New Atlantis"	1975	The New Atlantis
David Madden	"No Trace"	1970	The Shadow Knows
Bobbie Ann Mason	"Love Life"	1990	Love Life
Susan Minot	"Lust"	1989	Lust and Other Stories
Bharati Mukherjee	"The Tenant"	1988	The Middleman and Other Stories
Alice Munro	"Wild Swans"	1977, 1978	The Beggar Maid
Joyce Carol Oates	"Bad Girls"	1994	Boulevard
Tim O’Brien	"The Things They Carried"	1990	The Things They Carried
Jonathan Penner	"Emotional Recollected in Tranquillity"	1983	Private Parties
Jayne Anne Phillips	"Souvenir"	1979	Black Tickets
Mary Robison	"Coach"	1983	An Amateur's Guide to the Night
Amy Tan	"Rules of the Game"	1989	The Joy Luck Club
Hunter S. Thompson	"A Death in the Family"	1988	Generation of Swine
John Updike	"The Other"	1987	Trust Me
Guy Vanderhaeghe	"Going to Russia"	1982	Man Descending
Alice Walker	"Everyday Use"	1973	In Love and Trouble: Stories of Black Women
Joy Williams	"Taking Care"	1982	Taking Care
Tobias Wolff	"In the Garden of the North American Martyrs"	1981	In the Garden of the North American Martyrs
