= Solotaroff =

Solotaroff is a German-language transliteration of the Russian surname Zolotaryov. Notable people with this surname include:

- Hillel Solotaroff (1865–1921), Russian–American doctor known for his participation in the New York Yiddish anarchist movement
- Lynn Solotaroff (1929–1994), American translator of Tolstoy and Chekhov
- Ted Solotaroff (1928–2008), American writer, editor and literary critic
