= The Best American Short Stories 1979 =

1979 book

- Editor: Shannon Ravenel and Joyce Carol Oates
- Language: English
- Series: The Best American Short Stories
- Publisher: Houghton Mifflin Harcourt
- Media type: Print (hardback & paperback)
- ISBN: 978-0395277690
- Preceded by: The Best American Short Stories 1978
- Followed by: The Best American Short Stories 1980

The Best American Short Stories 1979, a volume in The Best American Short Stories series, was edited by Shannon Ravenel and by guest editor Joyce Carol Oates. The volume was published by Houghton Mifflin Harcourt.

== Background ==
The series is considered one of the "best-known annual anthologies of short fiction" and has anthologized more than 2,000 short stories, including works by some of the most famous writers in contemporary American literature, curated by well-known guest editors since 1915. Specifically, Amy Hempel considered it and the O. Henry Award's prize anthology to compile "the best short fiction published in American and Canadian magazines during the preceding year."

In particular, the Willa Cather Review wrote that The Best American Short Stories series "became a repository of values" for creative writing programs and literary magazines, specifically with considerable "influence" in college libraries, short fiction courses, and fiction workshops.

== Critical reception ==
Kirkus Reviews lauded Alice Munro's "Spelling" but found Flannery O'Connor's posthumous piece "not very good" and saw little interest in most of the pieces after the first few. Ultimately, the reviewer found the curation to be "A largely drab round-up, then, with the few, best stories utterly overshadowing the lesser efforts."

== Short stories included ==
Author	Story	Source
Saul Bellow	"A Silver Dish"	The New Yorker
Flannery O'Connor	"An Exile in the East"	The South Carolina Review
Séan Virgo	"Home and Native Land"	The Malahat Review
Kaatje Hurlbut	"A Short Walk Into Afternoon"	Southwest Review
William Styron	"Shadrach"	Esquire
Rosellen Brown	"The Wedding Week"	Boston University Journal
Isaac Bashevis Singer	"A Party in Miami Beach"	Playboy
Rolf Yngue	"The Quail"	Quarterly West
Peter LaSalle	"Some Manhattan in New England"	The Georgia Review
Lynne Sharon Schwartz	"Plaisir d'Amour"	The Ontario Review
Lyn Coffin	"Falling Off the Scaffold"	Michigan Quarterly Review
Alice Munro	"Spelling"	Weekend Magazine
Ruth McLaughlin	"Seasons"	California Quarterly
Robley Wilson Jr.	"Living Alone"	Fiction International
Mary Hedin	"The Middle Place"	Southwest Review
Herbert Wilner	"The Quarterback Speaks to His God"	Esquire
Annette Sanford	"Trip in a Summer Dress"	Prairie Schooner
Paul Bowles	"The Eye"	The Missouri Review
Jean Thompson	"Paper Covers Rock"	Mademoiselle
Maxine Kumin	"The Missing Person"	TriQuarterly
Louis D. Rubin Jr.	"Finisterre"	The Southern Review
Silvia Tennenbaum	"A Lingering Death"	The Massachusetts Review
Bernard Malamud	"Home is the Hero"	Atlantic Monthly
Donald Barthelme	"The New Music"	The New Yorker
Jayne Anne Phillips	"Something That Happened"	Gallimaufry
