= James Robison (author) =

American novelist (born 1946)

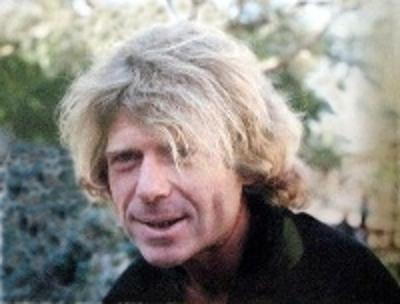
- Houston, Spring 1992
- Born: October 12, 1946 (age 79); Worthington, Ohio
- Occupations: Novelist; short story writer; poet; screenwriter
- Spouse: Mary Ferraro (m. 1997)
- Writing career
- Genres: Fiction & Poetry
- Notable awards: Pushcart Prize Whiting Award Rosenthal Award in Fiction - American Academy of Arts and Letters
- Website: jamesrobison.us

James Robison (born October 11, 1946) is an American novelist, short story writer, poet and screenwriter. The author of The Illustrator (1988) and Rumor and Other Stories (1985), his work has frequently appeared in The New Yorker and numerous other journals. He is a recipient of the Whiting Award for his short fiction and a Rosenthal Award from the American Academy of Arts and Letters. He has held teaching posts at numerous universities across the United States, including the University of Houston and Loyola University Maryland.

== Biography ==
Robison was born in Worthington, Ohio, in 1946. His father was a graphic artist and freelance illustrator in Columbus, Ohio. Robison attended Worthington High School from 1960 to 1964. He attended Ohio State University. After working for several years as a commercial artist, he continued his education, and received an MFA from Brown University in 1979, where he worked with Robert Coover, R.V. Cassill, and John Hawkes. His creative thesis was entitled Gold Whiskey and Other Stories. After Brown, he traveled to Baltimore and Boston. In 1988, he began teaching creative writing along with his former wife, the author Mary Robison, at the University of Houston Creative Writing Program, where he would spend much of the next decade. Since leaving Houston, he has taught at various universities, including as Visiting Writer at Loyola College of Maryland, The University of Southern Mississippi and the University of North Dakota. He's been married to the writer, Mary Ferraro, since 1997.

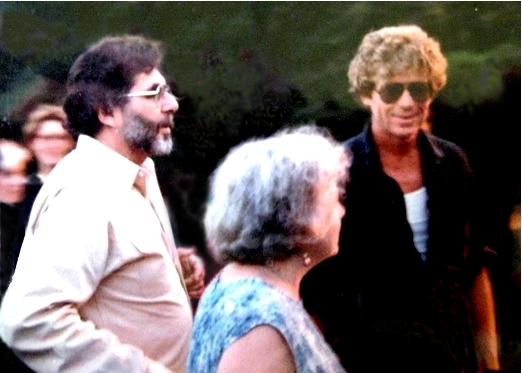
Alan Cheuse, Grace Paley and James Robison Bennington College Writers Workshop Vermont, Summer 1987

== Work ==
Robison's first publications were in literary journals, including eight stories in The New Yorker beginning in 1979, as well as Grand Street, The Mississippi Review, Best American Short Stories 1980 (selected by Stanley Elkin), and The Pushcart Prize Anthology. The Mississippi Review devoted an entire issue to his work in 1994.

His stories were first collected in Rumor and Other Stories in 1985. His first novel, The Illustrator, appeared in 1988. He has at least one screenplay to his credit, 2008's New Orleans, Mon Amour. Since 2010, his work has undergone something of a renaissance, with numerous new stories, flash fictions, and poems appearing in journals such as BLIP Magazine, SmokeLong Quarterly, Blue Fifth Review, and elsewhere. In 2012 he won a second Pushcart Prize for his short story "I See Men Like Trees, Walking" which will be included in the Pushcart 2013 Anthology.

=== Critical reception ===
Like most minimalists, he tends to eschew the term. Donald Barthelme called The Illustrator “a remarkable achievement,” and “a brilliant piece of work. It is funny and sinister and affecting and profound, all at the same time." Anthony Burgess said, "His ear is astounding, as is his narrative power, his ability to deal shocks and psychological truths, and his sheer grasp of the form." John Hawkes wrote "his stories are among the funniest, profoundest, and most exactingly written of any appearing in print." Of Rumor and Other Stories, Frederick Barthelme said "The world through James Robison's eyes is such a dazzling show of delicacy and precision that heartbreak turns on the choice of a verb. His dialogue is never less than perfect. Radiant, energetic, and above all, touching."

=== Recent work ===
Since 2010, Robison has again begun to publish extensively, with work appearing in The Manchester Review, Smokelong Quarterly, The Blue Fifth Review, Commonline, BLIP Magazine, Blast Furnace, Scythe Literary Journal, Metazen, The Raleigh Review, Whale Sound, and Corium Magazine. Normally reticent, he granted an interview to Smokelong Quarterly, in which he discussed aesthetics: "I saw a Nova-like show about dark matter, how scientists know that it exists because some light waves firing to earth bend and curve all around a precisely shaped nothingness. I thought, boy howdy, this is how so much art, plastic or literary, from the 20th and 21st Century behaves: Its true content is what it refuses to describe explicitly, but the shape of its meaning may be precisely limned by implication." Contributing to a piece posted in BLIP, he wrote: "For years, decades, I tried to teach the students to do lightning strike stuff. Bang. Blinding light. Whiff of burnt earth. Then go away and do not worry about anything because you have not done the great damage of boring anybody. It was years of this. NOW many are doing it and NOW, 25, 30 years later, it's good that they are and I am happy to see such stuff and even that its name is FLASH fiction."

He is an active member of the Fictionaut site, of which he said: "Fictionaut is a test track and display room for works in process and as a writer, your readers there make up a community of trusted and truthful equals, eerily reliable so far. Writing into a void is miserable, like telling jokes to a wall. Fictionaut provides a round-the-clock, faithfully attentive audience. It's a post post graduate-level workshop." In an interview with Meg Pokrass at Fictionaut Five, he said: "A story must have three ingredients, like, oral surgery, Puccini’s Turandot, and divorce. Or hurricane science, a niece, and physics. If I have three large thoughts, intuitions or detections about three varied things, I’ll launch a story." Later in the interview, he said, "Before you can be a writer you must make it new and the only way to do that is to run a harrowing, fearless, ruthless self audit. A psychological, emotional, moral inventory. You must know who you are, without delusions or self-deception, and what you find is apt to scare the spit out of you. But that is the truth you must accept and the truth from which you will construct every sentence."

== Awards and honors ==
- 1980 Best American Short Stories
- 1989 Rosenthal Foundation Award in Fiction - American Academy of Arts and Letters
- 1995 Whiting Award
- 1996 Pushcart Prize
- 2013 Pushcart Prize

== Bibliography ==
=== Novels ===
- Robison, James (1988). The illustrator. New York: Summit Books. ISBN 9780671527242.

=== Short fiction ===
==== Collections ====
- Robison, James (1979). Gold whiskey and other stories (MFA thesis). Brown University.
- Rumor and Other Stories (1985) ISBN 9780671527228
- 7 Stories: James Robison, Mississippi Review 22.3 (1994)

==== Short stories ====
Title	Year	First published	Reprinted/collected
The ecstasy of the animals	1979	Robison, James (1979). "The ecstasy of the animals". Mississippi Review. 8.1&2 (Winter–Spring): 30–34.	
Home	1979	Robison, James (December 24, 1979). "Home". The New Yorker. p. 32.	Robison, James (1980). "Home". In Elkin, Stanley (ed.). The best American short stories, 1980. ISBN 9780140060331.
The late style	1995	Robison, James (December 1995). "The late style". Mississippi Review Online. Archived from the original on 2010-08-23.	Robison, James (1996). "The late style". In Henderson, Bill (ed.). The Pushcart Prize XX : best of the small presses 1996. Pushcart Press.; Robison, James (2011). "The late style". Mississippi Review. 39 (1-3 (30 Year Anthology)).

- "Rumor" The New Yorker, 12 Jan. 1981: 35
- "The Line" The New Yorker, 30 Aug. 1982: 32
- "Set Off" The New Yorker, 27 Sept. 1982: 42
- "Transfer" The New Yorker, 31 Jan. 1983: 44
- "The Indian Gardens" The New Yorker, 3 Sept. 1984: 30
- "The Foundry" Grand Street, 4.1 (Autumn 1984): 7–15
- "Between Seasons" The New Yorker, 14 June 1993: 76
- "Square One" The New Yorker, 16 Aug. 1993: 82
- "Rodeo Days" Raleigh Review 1 (2010) ISBN 9780615402512
- "The Early Style" Corium Magazine 2 (June 2010)
- "Guard" SmokeLong Quarterly 29 (Sept 2010)
- "Be Bop" BLIP Magazine (Fall 2010)
- "Radio Talkers" The Manchester Review 5 (Oct 2010)
- "Prologue" elimae (Nov 2010)
- "Mars" BLIP Magazine, 9 Nov. 2010
- "Prodigal Heart" Ramshackle Review 2 (Dec 2010)
- "I See Men Like Trees, Walking" Wigleaf: (very) Short Fiction, 9 Feb. 2011
- "DETOX" Wilderness House Literary Review 22, 6.2 (July 2011)
- "Fall" Corium Magazine 6 (July 2011)
- "Great Lakes Foundry 1990" The Montréal Review (July 2011)
- "Why Poets Are No Good in Movies Nowadays and Four Poets and Which to Film" The Dublin Quarterly 16 (Sept 2011)
- "LVIV" StepAway Magazine 3 (Sept 2011)
- "There Are No Lines in Nature" Necessary Fiction, 2 Dec. 2011
- "Zurich" Salt Hill Journal 28 (2011): 41-45
- "LSD" The Manchester Review 8 (March 2012)
- "April" The Montréal Review (April 2012)

=== Poetry ===
Title	Year	First published	Reprinted/collected in
The slender scent	2010	Robison, James. "The slender scent". Fictionaut.	
I see men like trees, walking	2011	Robison, James (Feb 9, 2011). "I see men like trees, walking". Wigleaf.	Robison, James (2013). "I see men like trees, walking". In Henderson, Bill (ed.). The Pushcart Prize XXXVII : best of the small presses 2013. Pushcart Press. p. 296.

- "Kindness" Scythe Literary Journal III (Summer 2010)
- "Poem: 'For the Film New Orleans Mon Amour' & Comment" Blue Fifth Review Broadside Series #19 X.v (July 2010)
- "The Struggle Leaving" The Houston Literary Review (Sept 2010): 27
- "Gray Gaze" Metazen, 9 Sept. 2010
- "The Failure of Claws" Blue Fifth Review III (Fall 2010)
- "Bowls" The Santa Clara Review 98.1 (Fall/Winter 2010)
- "History Is The Work Of The Dead" Blast Furnace 1.1 (Winter 2010)
- "Weightless" Scythe Literary Journal IV (Winter 2010)
- "Late August" Istanbul Literary Review 19 (Jan 2011)
- "The Mystic in a Rage of Verse" The St. Sebastian Review 1.2 (Fall 2011): 13
- "Burning Tide," "Lemon Shark" Northwest Review 49.1 (2011): 77
- "Hector" Pirene's Fountain 4.10 (Oct 2011)
- "Benelli Nova Pump Shotgun" Thrush (March 2012)
- "A Temper" THIS Literary Magazine 14 (March/April 2012)

=== Interviews ===
- "James Robison" Interview by Robert Stewart and Rebekah Presson. New Letters on the Air, 18 Sept. 1987
- "Interview: James Robison" Interview by Patricia Lear. Other Voices 12 (Summer/Fall 1990)
- "Smoking With James Robison" Interview by Lauren Becker. SmokeLong Quarterly, 29 Sept. 2010
- "Fictionaut Five: James Robison", Interview by Meg Pokrass. Fictionaut Blog - A Literary Community for Adventurous Readers & Writers, 17 Nov. 2010

=== Articles, essays and other work ===
Title	Year	First published	Reprinted/collected in
Wrong Move: Utter Detachment, Utter Truth	2016	Robison, James (2016). Wrong Move: Utter Detachment, Utter Truth. Liner notes for Wim Wenders: The Road Trilogy. The Criterion Collection.	Robison, James (2016-06-01). "Wrong Move: Utter Detachment, Utter Truth". The Criterion Collection.

- "Notes for a Story" Hit and Run Magazine, 22 Mar. 2009
- "Some Grateful Thoughts About Fictionaut" Fictionaut Blog - A Literary Community for Adventurous Readers & Writers, 23 Apr. 2009
- "Wallace Stevens Week: James Robison on Stevens" BIG OTHER, 17 Nov. 2010
- "What May Have Been: Review of Letters of Jackson Pollock & Dori G by Susan Tepper and Gary Percesepe" Used Furniture Review, 14 Jan. 2011
- "Why I Write" The Montréal Review (Sept 2011)
- "A Temper" {Artwork} THIS Literary Magazine 14 (March/April 2012)

=== Screenplay ===
- New Orleans, Mon Amour (2008)

=== Audio ===
- "James Robison: 'Envy'" Reading and Interview with Robert Stewart and Rebekah Presson. New Letters on the Air, 18 Sept. 1987
- "The Slender Scent" Group Reading at Whale Sound, 17 Dec. 2010
  Comments at Voice Alpha
