= Rea Award for the Short Story =

The Rea Award for the Short Story is an annual award given to a living American or Canadian author chosen for unusually significant contributions to short story fiction.

== The Award ==
The Rea Award is named after Michael M. Rea, who was engaged in the real estate and radio industries, and was a passionate writer and collector of short stories. In 1986 he established the award, setting up the Dungannon Foundation to administer it. Rea died in 1996 and his widow, Elizabeth Richebourg Rea, currently administers the award process. A jury of three notable literary figures is selected and given complete independence to choose a winner of the award, which includes a grant of $30,000.

== The winners ==
- 1986 Cynthia Ozick
- 1987 Robert Coover
- 1988 Donald Barthelme
- 1989 Tobias Wolff
- 1990 Joyce Carol Oates
- 1991 Paul Bowles
- 1992 Eudora Welty
- 1993 Grace Paley
- 1994 Tillie Olsen
- 1995 Richard Ford
- 1996 Andre Dubus
- 1997 Gina Berriault
- 1998 John Edgar Wideman
- 1999 Joy Williams
- 2000 Deborah Eisenberg
- 2001 Alice Munro
- 2002 Mavis Gallant
- 2003 Antonya Nelson
- 2004 Lorrie Moore
- 2005 Ann Beattie
- 2006 John Updike
- 2007 Stuart Dybek
- 2008 Amy Hempel
- 2009 Mary Robison
- 2010 James Salter
- 2011 Charles Baxter
- 2012 Richard Bausch
- 2013 Elizabeth Spencer
- 2014 T. Coraghessan Boyle
- 2015 Andrea Barrett
- 2016 Jim Shepard
