= Mrs. Ted Bliss =

Novel by Stanley Elkin

- First hardcover edition (1995)
- Author: Stanley Elkin
- Language: English
- Genre: Fiction
- Publisher: Hyperion Books
- Publication date: 7 September 1995
- Publication place: United States
- Pages: 292
- ISBN: 0-7868-6104-5

Mrs. Ted Bliss is a 1995 novel by American author Stanley Elkin, published by Hyperion Books. It concerns the last eventful years in the life of an old widow. Elkin won the 1995 National Book Critics Circle Award in the fiction category for this work.

== Plot ==
Mrs. Dorothy Bliss is an old woman in her early 80s living alone in a retirement community near Miami Beach, Florida, after her husband's death due to cancer. She was born in Russia and is Jewish. Her mother bribed an immigration officer and added three years to her age on legal documents in order that she could start working in Manhattan's Lower East Side after their immigration. Her husband, Ted Bliss, had a butcher shop in Chicago and together they had three kids. Her oldest son dies of cancer at a young age and after her husband's retirement, the couple moved to Florida. She is obsessed with cleaning and also keeps records of the gifts given to her grandchildren in order to keep track and stay impartial with everyone.

The single life of Mrs. Bliss is now filled with expectations of finding a romance or a partner but eventually she is disappointed and heartbroken. She gets involved with Alcibiades Chitral, a drug lord who operates in her neighborhood, and starts using her and her husband's car as a front for his activities. The story keeps introducing various new men in her life, such as Hector Camerando, a jai alai pro who helps Mrs. Bliss with some tips on dogs, and Tommy Auveristas, an imposter. Junior Yellin, a once upon a time lover with whom Mrs. Bliss had had a passionate encounter in her husband's butcher shop, also makes a re-entry into her life. She eventually dies when Hurricane Andrew hits Miami and brings massive destruction.

== Publication ==
Following Elkin's death on 31 May 1995 at age 65, the novel was released posthumously on 7 September 1995. Elkin had published ten novels, five short-story collections, and various novellas and non-fiction articles in various magazines and papers during the course of his writing career, which began in the 1950s.

== Review and reception ==
Kirkus Reviews writes that Elkin makes readers believe that the novel has a plot when drug dealers are introduced in it. However, "there isn't so much a plot as an accumulation of detail about Mrs. Bliss". Elkin's "long poetic sentences about seemingly mundane minutiae" later bring substance to the character of Mrs. Bliss. Walter Goodman, a television critic for The New York Times, mentions in his review that "[the book] may not be Stanley Elkin's best, but it is a smart, generous, melancholy, funny, even elegiac work by a prodigious practitioner". Publishers Weekly writes that "Elkin is at his best here, blessed with the gift of one-liner insight and a definite, if reluctantly exercised, ability to tug on a reader's heartstrings".

== Awards ==
Elkin won the 1995 National Book Critics Circle Award in the fiction category for the novel. The book was nominated along with Independence Day (by Richard Ford), Galatea 2.2 (by Richard Powers), Moo (by Jane Smiley), and The Tent of Orange Mist (by Paul West). Elkin had earlier won in the same category for his 1982 novel George Mills.
