= Dancing After Hours =

- First edition
- Author: Andre Dubus
- Language: English
- Genre: Short story collection
- Publisher: Knopf
- Publication date: 1996
- Publication place: United States
- Media type: Print (hardback & paperback)
- Pages: 256 pp
- ISBN: 978-0-679-75114-4
- OCLC: 36540598
- Preceded by: Broken Vessels
- Followed by: Meditations from a Moveable Chair

Dancing After Hours is a book of short stories by Andre Dubus. First published in 1996 by Knopf, it was one of that year's New York Times Notable Books of the Year.

== Contents ==
- "The Intruder" — a confused adolescent boy's fantasies bring disaster.
- "A Love Song" — Catherine discovers her husband is having an affair.
- "Falling In Love" — a Vietnam veteran's love affair ends when his lover seeks an abortion.
- "Blessings" — Rusty deals with the aftermath of a horrific shark attack during a family vacation.
- "Sunday Morning" — a woman whose friend was murdered is convinced that she will never love and be loved.
- "All the Time in the World" — LuAnn Arceneaux meets Ted Briggs and falls in love.
- "Woman on a Plane" — a woman who hates flying travels on a plane to visit her dying brother.
- "The Colonel's Wife" — a veteran depends on his wife for everything after breaking his legs in a freak accident.
- "The Lover" — an aging man has a love affair with a younger woman and feels guilty for his failed marriages.
- "The Last Moon" — a young woman convinces her sixteen-year-old lover to murder her husband.
- "The Timing of Sin" — LuAnn Arceneaux tells her friend Marsha of an occasion when she almost committed adultery.
- "At Night" — an old woman's husband dies at night laying beside her.
- "Out of the Snow" — LuAnn Arceneaux beats two home invaders and scares them away.
- "Dancing After Hours" — a quadriplegic's tale of skydiving illuminates an extraordinary evening among a group of people in a bar.
