= American Review (literary journal) =

- Editor: Ted Solotaroff
- Categories: Literary magazine
- First issue: 1967; 59 years ago
- Final issue Number: 1977; 26
- Country: United States
- Based in: New York City
- Language: English

American Review (formerly the New American Review) was a literary journal published from 1967 to 1977 under editor Ted Solotaroff. Though it only published for ten years, it was the longest running paperback literary periodical at the time, and was influential for the large amount of work it published from notable authors.

== Publishing history ==
The American Review published its first issue in 1967 as New American Review, edited by Ted Solotaroff. It was printed and distributed as a paperback book by the New American Library from 1967 to 1970. When it began to struggle financially, it continued in smaller numbers at Simon & Schuster until 1972 before finally moving to Bantam Books in 1973. At first, it was published at a rate of three issues per year, then reduced to two starting in 1975. Solotaroff served as editor for the duration of its publication, though Stanley Moss and Richard Howard served as poetry editors.

The twenty-sixth and final issue was published in September 1977. It ceased publication for financial reasons, and because Solotaroff felt it had run its course. Its circulation had decreased from a peak of 100,000 to 50,000 and its price increased from $0.95 to $2.45 a copy. The New York Times reported that at the time, it was "the longest-running paperback literary periodical". Slate's Glenn Howard hypothesized that the publication's struggle may in part be due to the decline of "the countercultural project" of the 1960s.

== Content ==
American Review printed traditional and experimental fiction, poetry, and nonfiction essays and journalism, although it prioritized fiction and poetry. It only published certain types of nonfiction, like memoirs and social criticism, and tended to avoid politics and current events. It called itself a "little magazine" (although issues spanned about 250 pages) and aimed to bring high quality literature to a mass audience, or in Solotaroff's words, the "democratization of literary culture".

It was unusual for the number of well-known and later-known writers it attracted from its very first issue. Its list of prominent writers included Jorge Luis Borges, Norman Mailer, Gabriel García Márquez, Sylvia Plath, Philip Roth, and Susan Sontag, as well as Anna Akhmatova, A. Alvarez, A. R. Ammons, Max Apple, John Ashbery, Russell Banks, Donald Barthelme, Marshall Berman, John Berryman, Harold Brodkey, Robert Coover, George Dennison, E. L. Doctorow, Richard Eberhart, Stanley Elkin, Ralph Ellison, Leslie Epstein, William Gass, Richard Gilman, Allen Ginsberg, Albert Goldman, Günter Grass, Robert Graves, Peter Handke, Michael Herr, Richard Hugo, Stanley Kauffmann, Ian McEwan, James Merrill, W. S. Merwin, Leonard Michaels, Kate Millett, Brian Moore, Conor Cruise O'Brien, Cynthia Ozick, Grace Paley, J. F. Powers, V. S. Pritchett, Mordecai Richler, Tom Robbins, Theodore Roszak, Lore Segal, Anne Sexton, Wilfrid Sheed, Gilbert Sorrentino, Robert Stone, James Welch, and Ellen Willis. Among the notable works published in whole or in part in the Review were Roth's Portnoy's Complaint, Millett's Sexual Politics, Moore's Catholics, Handke's A Sorrow Beyond Dreams, Coover's The Public Burning, and Doctorow's Ragtime.

In total, the American Review published 26 issues, including about 200 short stories, 300 poems, and 130 essays written by 500 authors.

== Legacy ==
Upon the publication's final issue, Richard Locke of The New York Times praised the content, influence, and ambition of American Review, while criticizing elements of Solotaroff's editorial style, such as his disinterest in impersonal forms of writing, his unwillingness to define standards, and his passive approach of letting authors bring work to him rather than cultivating a stronger guiding concept:

[I]n his admirable reluctance to turn the review into a closed shop or to lay down an ideological line, he reduced his editorial criteria to an unarguable question of taste. And so the magazine was simply Solotaroff – not an institution like the old Partisan or Kenyon reviews, "little magazines" with an articulate, developing cultural position, but rather a product of one man's taste. I like that taste ... but finally American Review was a succession of excellent literary anthologies, not a magazine in the usual sense.

Years later, Glenn Howard wrote an appreciation in Slate, calling American Review "the greatest American literary magazine ever." Vanity Fair's James Wolcott said the publication "started off stellar and never lost altitude, never peaked out, continuing to make literary news back when literary news didn't seem like an oxymoron, each issue bearing something eventful".
