= Jerome Charyn =

American writer (born 1937)

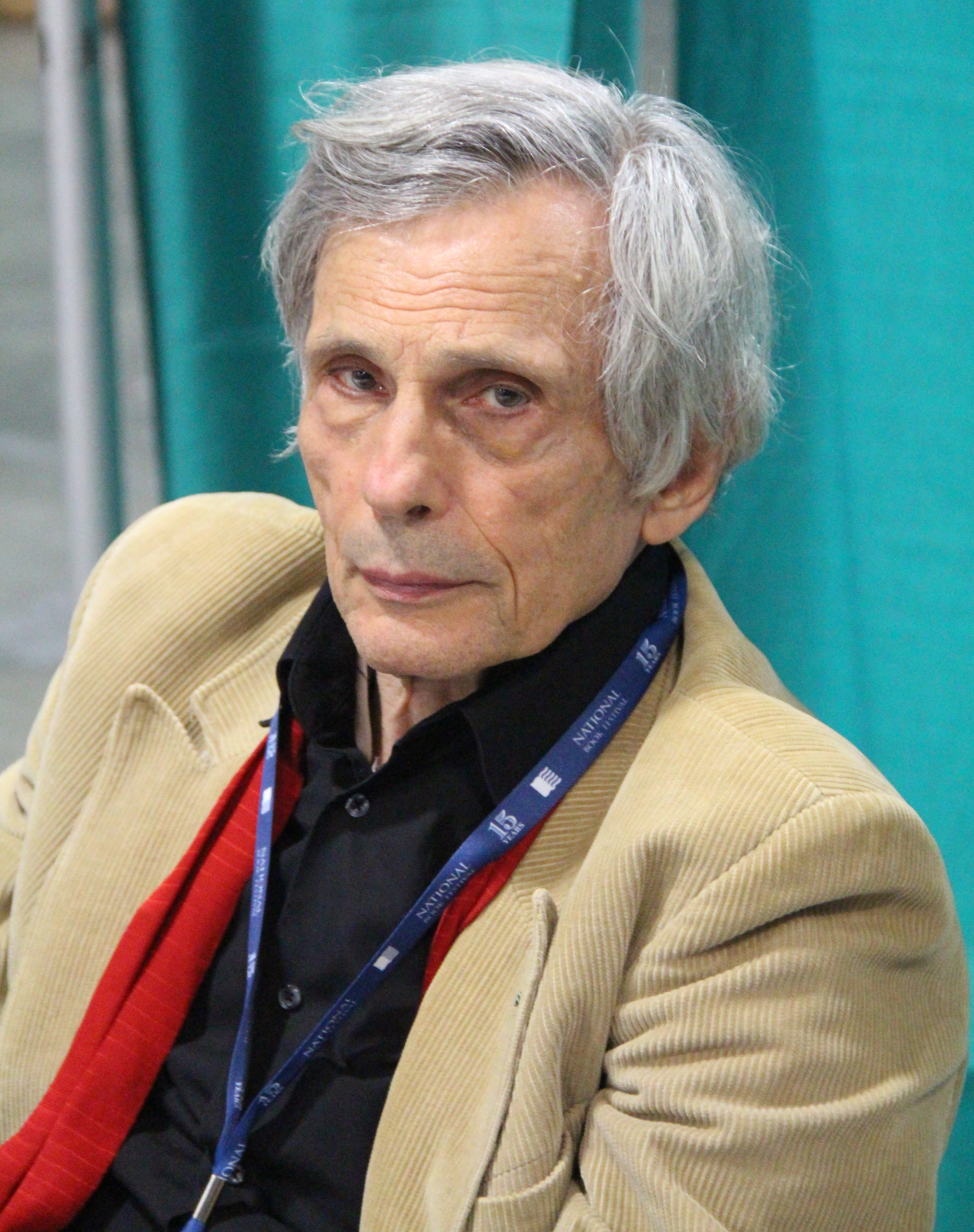
- Charyn at the 2015 National Book Festival
- Born: May 13, 1937 (age 89); New York City, U.S.
- Education: Columbia University (BA)
- Occupations: Novelist; playwright; author
- Spouse: Lenore Riegel
- Writing career
- Period: 1963–present

Jerome Charyn (born May 13, 1937) is an American writer. With nearly 50 published works over a 50-year span, Charyn has a long-standing reputation as an inventive and prolific chronicler of real and imagined American life, writing in multiple genres.

Michael Chabon calls him "one of the most important writers in American literature". New York Newsday hailed Charyn as "a contemporary American Balzac", and the Los Angeles Times described him as "absolutely unique among American writers".

Charyn's first novel, Once Upon a Droshky, was published in 1964. With Blue Eyes (1975), the debut of detective character Isaac Sidel, Charyn attracted wide attention and acclaim. As of 2017, Charyn has published 37 novels, three memoirs, nine graphic novels, two books about film, short stories, plays and works of non-fiction. Two of his memoirs were named New York Times Book of the Year. Charyn has been a finalist for the PEN/Faulkner Award for Fiction. Charyn was awarded a John Simon Guggenheim Memorial Fellowship in Fiction, 1983. He received the Rosenthal Award from the American Academy of Arts and Letters and has been named Commander of Arts and Letter (Ordre des Arts et des Lettres) by the French Minister of Culture.

Charyn was Distinguished Professor of Film Studies at the American University of Paris until 2009, when he retired from teaching.

In addition to his writing and teaching, Charyn is a tournament table tennis player, once ranked in the top 10 percent of players in France. Novelist Don DeLillo called Charyn's book on table tennis, Sizzling Chops & Devilish Spins, "The Sun Also Rises of ping-pong".

Charyn lives in Paris and New York City.

== Early life ==
Charyn was born in the Bronx, New York City, to Sam and Fanny (Paley) Charyn. In order to escape its mean streets, Charyn immersed himself in comic books and cinema. Books were scarce in the Charyn household, save for volume "A" of the Book of Knowledge. After becoming all too well versed in astronomy and aardvarks, Charyn hungered for more. He attended The High School of Music and Art in Manhattan, majoring in painting. Turning from painting to literature, Charyn enrolled at Columbia University, where he studied history and comparative literature with a focus on Russian literature, graduating Phi Beta Kappa and cum laude (BA, 1959).

== Teaching career ==
From 1962 through 1964, Charyn taught at his alma mater, Manhattan's High School of Music and Art, and at High School of Performing Arts, popularized in the movie Fame.

Charyn lectured in English at the City College of New York in 1965. He was assistant professor of English at Stanford University from 1965 to 1968. He served as a visiting professor in colleges across the country, including Rice University in 1979 and Princeton University, from 1981 until 1986. From 1988 to 1989, Charyn was Distinguished Professor at the City College of New York.

From 1995 to 2008, Charyn taught film at American University of Paris, where he is Distinguished Professor emeritus.

Charyn serves on the advisory board of the Laboratoire d'Études et de Recherche sur le Monde Anglophone (LERMA), a research centre at Aix-Marseille University.

== Literary career ==
Charyn often returns to his native Bronx in many of his writings, including a book appropriately named El Bronx. Michael Woolf, who wrote Exploding the Genre: The Crime Fiction of Jerome Charyn, says of Charyn: "Of all the novelists characterized as Jewish-American, Charyn is the most radical and inventive. There is in the body of his work a restless creativity which constantly surprises and repeatedly undermines the reader's expectation."

One of Charyn's best-known protagonists is Isaac Sidel, a Jewish New York police detective turned mayor, who is the subject of eleven crime novels, including Blue Eyes and Citizen Sidel. Charyn became interested in writing a crime novel after discovering Ross Macdonald's The Galton Case (1959). What impressed Charyn most was the narrative voice of sleuth Lew Archer—at once sympathetic and detached, who "deliver[s] both a landscape and a past without least hint of sentimentality." The experiences of Charyn's brother, Harvey, an NYPD homicide detective, added authenticity to this popular series, which attracted a cult following worldwide. After the limited success of his earlier works, Charyn considered publishing the first Sidel novel under what he described as the Marrano pen name of Joseph da Silva (i.e., to obscure his Jewish origins), but was convinced by his agent to use his birth name.

The ten books were translated into seven languages and remained in print for three decades. In 1991, Charyn co-produced and co-wrote a TV pilot starring Ron Silver as The Good Policemen. More recently, in April 2012, Otto Penzler, founder of Mysterious Press, reissued the entire series as eBooks, co-published by Open Road Media. The October 2012, publication of Under the Eye of God, the first new Sidel thriller in a decade, rebooted the series ahead of a planned adult animated TV drama, to be titled Hard Apple.

Charyn's eight graphic novels were teamed him up with artists like Jacques de Loustal, José Antonio Muñoz and François Boucq, together with whom he won the 1998 Angoulême Grand Prix. Much of his writing in this genre was influenced by the comic books he devoured as a child. Charyn himself says comic books helped him learn to read.

Charyn's books have been translated into French, German, Italian, Spanish, Greek, Chinese and 11 other languages. Charyn served as judge for the 2011 National Book Awards in Fiction. He is represented by the literary agency headed by Georges Borchardt.

Charyn's personal papers are held by the Fales Library at New York University.

=== The Secret Life of Emily Dickinson ===
The publication of his 2010 novel The Secret Life of Emily Dickinson (W.W. Norton) stirred a great deal of controversy. Some critics felt that Charyn was much too brazen in writing in poet Emily Dickinson's voice and surrounding her with invented characters. The New York Times said this "fits neatly into the flourishing genre of literary body-snatching". In the San Francisco Chronicle, the novel was called a "bodice-ripper".

Other critics saw the work as a magical tour de force. Joyce Carol Oates, writing in The New York Review of Books, said: "Of literary sleights of hand none is more exhilarating for the writer, as none is likely to be riskier, than the appropriation of another—classic—writer's voice." In the Globe and Mail, reviewer William Kowalski wrote: "I had hoped that there was someone like Dickinson out there. My one regret, after finding her, was that I would never get to make her acquaintance. No doubt millions of others feel the same. It's for us that Jerome Charyn has written this book."

In The Secret Life of Emily Dickinson, Charyn attempts to bring America's greatest female poet to life by transforming himself into Emily Dickinson. Assuming her voice, he narrates Dickinson's "secret life" to the reader, delving into her childhood, romantic involvements, even her final illness and death.

On May 1, 2011, The Secret Life of Emily Dickinson was named a "Must-Read" book by the Massachusetts Center for the Book and selected as finalist for its annual book award in the fiction category. The French edition of his novel, titled la vie secrète d'emily dickinson, was released by Rivages in 2013,

Charyn says he drew inspiration for his novel from Emily Dickinson's letters and poems. He says of Dickinson: "I am fascinated by her writing and the kind of power she had. Where it came from, I don't think we'll ever know."

=== "The Collagists" ===
In 2007 Charyn was asked by the literary website Smyles and Fish, along with lifelong friend, novelist Frederic Tuten, to write an essay about their former colleague and friend Donald Barthelme. The project evolved into a lengthy article, which offers a sort of collage of these three writers and the world of their influences. The work is divided into three parts - an introductory essay on the project by editor-in-chief Iris Smyles, Charyn's essay on Barthelme, and Tuten's piece My Autobiography: Portable with Images. The work also features photos of the three writers and their work, as well as quotes from Barthelme himself.

== Advocacy and charity work ==
In 1968, Charyn joined Noam Chomsky, Dr. Benjamin Spock, Gloria Steinem, William Styron, Kurt Vonnegut, Joan Baez, Allen Ginsberg, Susan Sontag, Thomas Pynchon, Henry Miller, James Baldwin and more than 400 others in signing the "Writers and Editors War Tax Protest" pledge, vowing to refuse tax payments in protest against the Vietnam War.

== Personal life ==
Charyn has lived in Greenwich Village, the Bronx, San Francisco, Los Angeles, Palo Alto, California, Houston, Austin, Texas, Paris, and Barcelona. He currently divides his time between New York and Paris. During 14 years living in Paris and teaching at the American University, he resisted mastering the French language, fearful of its effect on "the rhythm [of my native speech], even though French words creep into your vocabulary. I don't want my music interfered with."

Charyn is married to Lenore Riegel, mother of actress Eden Riegel and voice actor Sam Riegel.

== Bibliography ==
Isaac Sidel series

- Blue Eyes, Simon & Schuster, 1975
- Marilyn the Wild, Arbor House, 1976
- The Education of Patrick Silver, Arbor House, 1976
- Secret Isaac, Arbor House, 1978
- The Good Policeman, Mysterious Press, 1990
- Maria's Girls, Warner Books, 1992
- Montezuma's Man, Warner Books, 1993
- Little Angel Street, Warner Books, 1995
- El Bronx, Warner Books, 1997
- Citizen Sidel, Mysterious Press, 1999
- Under the Eye of God, Mysterious Press and Open Road Media, 2012
- Winter Warning: An Isaac Sidel Novel, Pegasus Books, October 2017
- The Isaac Quartet, Four Walls Eight Windows, 2002 (Omnibus of the first four Sidel novels)

Other novels

- Once upon a Droshky, McGraw-Hill, 1964
- On the Darkening Green, McGraw-Hill, 1965
- The Man Who Grew Younger, Harper & Row, 1967
- Going To Jerusalem, Viking, 1967
- American Scrapbook, Viking, 1969
- Eisenhower, My Eisenhower, Holt, 1971
- The Tar Baby, Holt, 1973
- The Franklin Scare, Arbor House, 1977
- The Seventh Babe, Arbor House, 1979
- The Catfish Man, Arbor House, 1980
- Darlin' Bill, Arbor House, 1980
- Panna Maria, Arbor House, 1982
- Pinocchio's Nose, Arbor House, 1983
- War Cries Over Avenue C, Donald I. Fine, 1985
- Paradise Man, Donald I. Fine, 1987
- Elsinore, Warner Books, 1991
- Back to Bataan, Farrar, Straus (for younger readers), 1993
- Death of a Tango King, New York University Press, 1998
- Captain Kidd, St. Martin's Press, 1999
- Hurricane Lady, Warner Books, 2001
- The Green Lantern, Thunder's Mouth Press, 2004
- Johnny One-Eye: A Tale of the American Revolution, W.W.Norton, 2008
- The Secret Life of Emily Dickinson, W.W.Norton, 2010
- I Am Abraham: A Novel of Lincoln and the Civil War. W. W. Norton & Company. February 3, 2014. ISBN 978-0-87140-427-5.
- Jerzy: A Novel, Bellevue Literary Press, March 2017
- The Perilous Adventures of the Cowboy King: A Novel of Teddy Roosevelt and His Times, Liveright, 2019
- Cesare: A Novel of War-Torn Berlin, Bellevue Literary Press, 2020
- Sergeant Salinger, Bellevue Literary Press, 2021
- Big Red, Liveright, 2022
- Maria La Divina, Bellevue Literary Press, 2025

Short stories and collections (selected)

- The Man Who Grew Younger and Other Stories, Harper, 1967
- Bitter Bronx: Thirteen Stories, Liveright Publishing Corporation, 2015, ISBN 9780871404893
- "The Blue Book of Crime", in The New Black Mask, Harcourt Brace, 1986
- "Fantomas in New York", in A Matter of Crime, Harcourt Brace, 1988
- "Young Isaac", in The Armchair Detective, 1990
- "Lorelei". Atlantic Monthly Summer Fiction Issue. Summer 2010.
- "Silk & Silk". Narrative Magazine's. October 2010.
- "Adonis" in The American Scholar, Winter, 2011 Issue
- "Little Sister". Atlantic Monthly Fiction Issue. 2011.
- Alice's Eyes. American Short Fiction Summer 2011.
- The Paperhanger's Wife. Fiction, Number 58. 2012.
- "Archie and Mehitabel". The American Scholar, Fiction. Summer 2012.
- The Major Leaguer. Ellery Queen Mystery Magazine. September–October 2013.

Comics

- La femme du magicien, art by François Boucq, Casterman, 1986 (published in English by Dover Press as The magician's wife, 2015)
- Bouche du diable, art by François Boucq, Casterman, 1990 (published in English by Dover Press as Billy Budd, KGB, 2016)
- Les frères Adamov, art by Jacques de Loustal, Casterman, 1991 (published in English by Dover Press as The boys of Sheriff Street, 2016)
- Margot, art by Massimiliano Frezzato, Glénat, 1991–1995
- Family Man, art by Joe Staton, Paradox Press, 1995
- Madame Lambert, art by Andreas Gefe, Arrache Cœur, 1997
- Le croc du serpent, art by José Antonio Muñoz, Casterman, 1997
- Panna Maria, art by José Antonio Muñoz, Casterman, 1999 (adapted by the homonym novel by Charyn himself)
- White Sonya, art by Jacques de Loustal, Casterman, 2000
- Marilyn la dingue, art by Frédéric Rébéna, Denoël, 2008 (adapted by the novel Marilyn the wild by Charyn himself)
- Little Tulip, art by François Boucq, Casterman, 2014 (published in English by Dover Press as Little Tulip, 2017)
- Corb-nez, art by Emmanuel Civiello, Le Lombard, 2018
- New York Cannibals, art by François Boucq, Casterman, 2020 (sequel to Little Tulip)

Non-fiction

- Metropolis: New York as Myth, Marketplace and Magical Land, Putnam's, 1986
  - Translated and adapted into French by Cécile Bloc-Rodot – New York : Chronique d'une ville sauvage, coll. Découvertes Gallimard (nº 204), Paris: Gallimard, 1994 (also translated into Spanish, Italian, Korean and simplified Chinese, as translated from the French version)
- Movieland: Hollywood and the Great American Dream Culture, Putnam's, 1989, New York University Press, 1996
- The Dark Lady from Belorusse, St. Martin's Press, 1997
- Hemingway : Portrait de l'artiste en guerrier blessé, coll. Découvertes Gallimard (nº 371), Paris: Gallimard, 1999
  - Trad. into traditional Chinese by Chʻên Li-chʻing – Hai Ming Wei: Shang hên lei lei tê wên hsüeh lao ping, collection "Fa hsien chih lü" (vol. 57), Taipei: China Times Publishing, 2001
- The Black Swan, St. Martin's Press, 2000
- Sizzling Chops & Devilish Spins: Ping-Pong and the Art of Staying Alive, Four Walls Eight Windows, 2001
- Bronx Boy: A Memoir. St. Martin's Press. April 11, 2002. ISBN 978-0-312-27810-6.
- Gangsters & Gold Diggers: Old New York, the Jazz Age, and the Birth of Broadway, Four Walls Eight Windows, 2003
- Savage Shorthand: The Life and Death of Isaac Babel. Random House Publishing Group. December 18, 2007. ISBN 978-0-307-43179-0.
- Inside the Hornet's Head: an anthology of Jewish American Writing, Thunder's Mouth Press, 2005
- Raised by Wolves: The Turbulent Art and Times of Quentin Tarantino, Thunder's Mouth Press, 2005
- Marilyn : La dernière déesse, Découvertes Gallimard (n° 517), Gallimard, 2007
  - Marilyn: The Last Goddess [an illustrated biography of Marilyn Monroe from Abrams Discoveries series], Abrams, 2008
- Joe DiMaggio: The Long Vigil, Yale University Press, American Icon series, March 2011
- A Loaded Gun: Emily Dickinson for the 21st Century, Bellevue Literary Press, March 2016

Selected plays and documentaries

- George (three-act play) developed at the Actors Studio, under Arthur Penn, staged readings at La Maison des Ecrivains (Paris 1988) and Ubu Repertory Theater (NY 1990)
- Empire State Building, co-writer, semi-fictional documentary broadcast by Canal Plus, (France 2008)

As editor

- Editor, The Single Voice: An Anthology of Contemporary Fiction. New York, Collier, 1969
- Editor, The Troubled Vision: An Anthology of Contemporary Short Novels and Passages. New York, Collier, 1970
- Editor, The New Mystery. New York, Dutton, 1993

About Jerome Charyn

- Vallas, Sophie (2014). Conversations with Jerome Charyn. Jackson, Mississippi: University Press of Mississippi. ISBN 9781628460902. OCLC 875056195.
- Vallas, Sophie (2013). Jérome Charyn et les siens : autofictions. Aix-en-Provence: Presses universitaires de Provence. ISBN 9782853998727. OCLC 859437774.
- The Review of Contemporary Fiction Summer 1992 issue, devoted to work of Charyn and José Donoso
- Polar (Paris) summer 1995 issue, devoted to Jerome Charyn
- Air France Magazine cover story on novel Citizen Sidel, August 1997
- "Notes on the Rhetoric of Anti-Realist Fiction" by Albert Guerard, in Tri-Quarterly (Evanston, Finding the MusicIllinois), Spring 1974
- "Jerome Charyn: Artist as Mytholept" by Robert L. Patten, in Novel (Providence, Rhode Island), Fall, 1984
- "Exploding the Genre: The Crime Fiction of Jerome Charyn" by Michael Woolf, in American Crime Fiction: Studies in the Genre Brian Docherty (ed.), New York, St. Martin's Press, 1988, p. 132 and p. 138.
- "Finding the Music: An Interview with Jerome Charyn on The Secret Life of Emily Dickinson"https://journals.openedition.org/erea/1737, Richard Phelan and Sophie Vallas, E-REA 8–2, 2011. https://doi.org/10.4000/erea.1737
- Vallas, Sophie. "The Bronx in Short Trousers: Jerome Charyn's Mischievous Childhood Recollections in The Dark Lady from Belorusse", in Life Writing, Taylor & Francis Online (April 8, 2021). https://doi.org/10.1080/14484528.2021.1907890
- Vallas Sophie, "La possibilité d'une île: la mythologie du Bronx, archipel enchanté, dans trois textes autobiographiques de Jerome Charyn", in Nathalie Cochoy et Sylvie Maurel (eds.): L'Art de la ville/ The Art of the city, Anglophonia/ Caliban (Université Toulouse-II-Le Mirail), n°25/2009, p. 75-85.
- Vallas Sophie, "D'autres vies dans la mienne : l'écriture (auto)biographique de Jerome Charyn", in Joanny Moulin, Yannick Gouchan et Nguyen Phuong Ngoc, Études biographiques. La biographie au carrefour des humanités, Paris, Honoré Champion, 2018, 135–144.
- Vallas Sophie, "Saturne et l'orphelin : les relations familiales dans le cycle Isaac Sidel de Jerome Charyn", in Sylvie Crinquand et Mélanie Joseph-Vilain (eds.), dossier "Le détective en famille", Textes & Contextes, 15–2, 2020. https://preo.ube.fr/textesetcontextes/index.php?id=2829
- Vallas Sophie, "Tat[o]ueur : pouvoirs du tatouage dans Little Tulip, de Jerome Charyn et François Boucq", Transatlantica, 2023/2 (https://doi.org/10.4000/transatlantica.21353), https://journals.openedition.org/transatlantica/21353

== Literary archives ==
- Charyn's archives and manuscripts are housed in the Fales Collection at Elmer Holmes Bobst Library of New York University, since 1993.

== Sources ==
- Jerome Charyn's introduction to The Isaac Quartet - Black Box edition of the first four Isaac Sidel books, Four Walls Eight Windows, New York and London, 2002
- Twentieth Century Crime and Mystery Writers
- Exploding The Genre: The Crime Fiction of Jerome Charyn in American Crime Fiction, Ed. B. Doherty, St Martin's Press 1988
- Neon Noir by Woody Haut, Chapter 6 "From Mean Streets to Dream Streets". Serpents Tail, 1999
- Jerome Charyn Topics, The New York Times.
- Jerome Charyn Interview: bookreporter.com.
- Jerome Charyn Interview: IndieBound.org.
- Powell's Book Blog.
- Master of Mythologies: The Fictional Worlds of Jerome Charyn, Marvin Taylor, Curator, Fales Library.
