= George Mills (novel) =

Book by Stanley Elkin

- First hardcover edition (1980)
- Author: Stanley Elkin
- Language: English
- Genre: Fiction
- Publisher: E. P. Dutton
- Publication date: 25 October 1982
- Publication place: United States
- Pages: 548
- ISBN: 1564782921

George Mills is a 1982 novel by American author Stanley Elkin, published by E. P. Dutton. The novel, set in five parts, tells the family history of succeeding generations of characters named George Mills. The story covers more than 1,000 years from the First Crusade in Europe to the Ottoman Empire to present-day America. Elkin won the 1982 National Book Critics Circle Award in the fiction category for the novel. Elkin mentioned George Mills as one of his favorite novels. The novel is considered Elkin's "longest and most complexly organized work".

== Plot ==
The first George Mills sets out on a journey with his lord on the First Crusade. But he eventually gets lost in the Netherlands and reaches a salt mine in Poland. His lord at the mines is Guillalume, who teaches him some life lessons. Mills becomes aware of what is written in his fate and this helps him understand the walks of life in this world in a better manner. Despite having the knowledge of what would happen in the future, his timidity and powerlessness does not bring out any situation-changing effects.

The novel covers the history of succeeding family members named George Mills and all of them are aware of their fates and equally feeble and ineffective in changing their circumstances. The 43rd Mills encounters King George IV and is assigned on a diplomatic mission to Constantinople, where he first joins the Janissaries but later ends up in the Ottoman Sultan's harem doing household chores. He escapes from there and reaches America. The present-day Mills in America is a caretaker of an old woman named Judith Glazer in St. Louis, who is in the final stages of terminal cancer. Mills accompanies Glazer to Mexico and upon her death participates in her funeral together with her family.

== Publication ==
Elkin worked for over seven years writing George Mills and by the end of its completion, he felt exhausted and insisted this would be his last fictional work. But after watching a British news report of how terminally ill children had a memorable experience at Disneyland, he wrote his next novel, The Magic Kingdom (1985), and dedicated it to his son who had died young from a medical ailment after lengthy treatments.

George Mills was published on 25 October 1982. In 1989, Elkin mentioned that several sections of George Mills had been adapted from the 1936 novel Absalom, Absalom! by William Faulkner. He also mentioned that in writing the novel, he came to realise "that I was a novelist, that anything I say is a part of this novel is a part of this novel".

== Review and reception ==
Kirkus Reviews called the novel "a leaky collection of parts rather than one whole strong book" but said it was required reading for connoisseurs of comic fiction. The New York Times reviewer Leslie Epstein complimented "the novel's fine writing, flashes of humor and memorable heroine", but felt that the plot was "out of control". Brad Owens of The Christian Science Monitor praised the novel for its "energetic entertainment" and said that it "sometimes overpowers its more serious intentions".

== Awards ==
Elkin won the 1982 National Book Critics Circle Award in the fiction category for the novel. The novel was nominated along with Levitation: Five Fictions (by Cynthia Ozick), Dinner at the Homesick Restaurant (by Anne Tyler), The Color Purple (by Alice Walker), and Shiloh and Other Stories (by Bobbie Ann Mason). Elkin also won the award in 1995 for his novel Mrs. Ted Bliss.
