= Massimiliano Frezzato =

Italian comic book author (1967–2024)

Massimiliano Frezzato (12 March 1967 – 21 October 2024) was an Italian comic book author.

Born in Turin, he studied at the liceo artistico in his hometown and began his career in 1985. In 1990 he started the series Margot, written by Jerome Charyn.

His most famous work was I custodi del Maser (Keepers of the Maser), which appeared in 1996 and has been translated in numerous countries, including United States, Germany, France, Belgium, Portugal, Poland and Denmark.

Frezzato's influences included Moebius, Enki Bilal, Tanino Liberatore, Hayao Miyazaki and Katsuhiro Ōtomo.

He illustrated several cards for Magic: The Gathering.

Frezzato died on 21 October 2024, at the age of 57.

== Bibliography ==
=== English translations ===
Hardcover editions by Heavy Metal

- Keepers of the Maser Series:
  - Second Moon (52 pages, 1997, ISBN 1-882931-24-6)
  - Isle of Dwarves (64 pages, 1998, ISBN 1-882931-36-X)
  - Eye of the Sea (1999, ISBN 1-882931-44-0)
  - The Iron Tower (2000, ISBN 1-882931-61-0)
  - The Edge of the World (64 pages, 2003, ISBN 1-882931-84-X)
  - The Lost Village (52 pages, 2005, ISBN 1-932413-35-9)
  - The Young Queen (script by Massimiliano Frezzato, art by Fabio Ruotolo) (2007, ISBN 978-1-932413-71-7)
- Other works:
  - Frezzato Sketchbooks (46 pages, 2002, ISBN 1-882931-77-7)

Works published in Heavy Metal Magazine (including special issues)

- Longer stories:
  - Margot: Queen Of The Night (Jerome Charyn and Massimiliano Frezzato) (63 pages, 1995-Overdrive Special - Vol. 9 No. 1)
  - The Keepers Of The Maser (1): The Second Moon (Massimiliano Frezzato) (44 pages, 1997-March - Vol. 21 No. 1)
  - The Keepers Of The Maser 2: The Isle of Dwarves (44 pages, 1998-Spring special - Vol. 12 No. 1)
  - The Keepers Of The Maser: Kolony: The Essential Survival Guide (44 pages, 1998-Spring special - Vol. 12 No. 1)
  - The Keepers Of The Maser 3: Eye Of The Sea (Massimiliano Frezzato and Nikita Mandryka) (44 pages, 1999-July - Vol. 22 No. 3)
  - The Keepers Of The Maser 4: The Iron Tower (Massimiliano Frezzato and Nikita Mandryka) (44 pages, 2000-November - Vol. 24 No. 5)
  - The Keepers Of The Maser 5: The Edge Of The World (Massimiliano Frezzato and Nikita Mandryka) (44 pages, 2003-May - Vol. 27 No. 2)
  - The Keepers Of The Maser 6: The Lost Village (Massimiliano Frezzato and Nikita Mandryka) (51 pages, 2005-September - Vol. 29 No. 4)
  - The Keepers Of The Maser 7: The Young Queen (Massimiliano Frezzato and Fabio Ruotolo) (44 pages, 2007-Spring special - Vol. 21 No. 1)
- Short stories
  - Dear Enemy (9 pages, 1996 - January - Vol. 19 No. 6)
  - The Pleasure Of Love (5 pages, 1996 - November - Vol. 20 No. 5)
  - Pee Pee (4 pages, 1996 - November - Vol. 20 No. 5)
  - Dog Face (5 pages, 1997 - May - Vol. 21 No. 2)
  - The Last Resource (3 pages, 1997 - 20 Years - Fall Special - Vol. 11 No. 2)
  - Tip-In Series No. 17 (1 page, 2004 - May - Vol. 28 No. 2)

=== English works ===
- Wolverine annual 1999. Artwork for the second story, Beer Run, written by Marc Andreyko.
