= Georges Borchardt =

American literary agent (1928–2026)

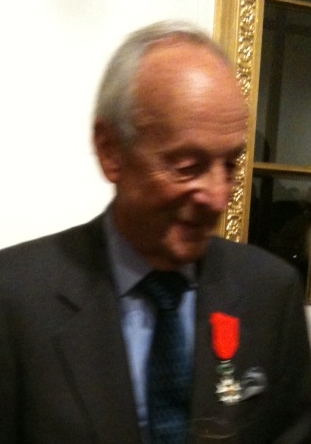
- Borchardt in 2010
- Born: Thomas Georges Borchardt; February 24, 1928; Berlin, Brandenburg, Prussia, Germany
- Died: January 18, 2026 (aged 97); New York City, U.S.
- Occupation: Literary agent
- Years active: 1947–2026
- Board member of: PEN International
- Spouse: Anne Bolton Borchardt (m. 1961)
- Children: 1
- Honours: Legion of Honour (2010)

Thomas Georges Borchardt (February 24, 1928 – January 18, 2026) was an American literary agent. He represented figures such as General Charles de Gaulle and Jane Fonda.

== Early life ==
Born in Berlin to Jewish parents on February 24, 1928, Borchardt was in France with his family when World War II broke out in 1939; his father died when Borchardt was eleven years old. He spent his teenage years hiding in plain sight, as an undocumented student in Aix-en-Provence, relying on strangers to protect him after his mother and most of his family perished in concentration camps. Borchardt emigrated to the US in 1947, settling in New York.

== Career ==
Borchardt's first job in New York was as an assistant in a literary agency specializing in foreign writers. In 1959, it was Borchardt who secured an American publisher for Elie Wiesel's Night, following rejection after rejection by publishers who labeled the memoir of Wiesel's internment in concentration camps too morbid for American readers. Night has sold more than six million copies in the United States alone.

He was responsible for the American publication of the first works by Samuel Beckett. He also introduced to American readers major works by Roland Barthes, Pierre Bourdieu, Marguerite Duras, Frantz Fanon, Michel Foucault, Eugène Ionesco, Jacques Lacan, Alain Robbe-Grillet, Laurent de Brunhoff and Jean-Paul Sartre.

Borchardt lectured widely on publishing. He served on the board of International PEN and as president of the Association of Authors' Representatives.

In 1967, Borchardt branched out on his own, establishing his New York-based literary agency, Georges Borchardt, Inc., with the assistance of his wife, Anne Bolton Borchardt. Their daughter, Valerie Borchardt, joined the agency in 1999.

The Borchardt agency represents many important authors, including Elie Wiesel, Ian McEwan, Jerome Charyn, Robert Coover, Jack Miles, and T. C. Boyle, who once described Borchardt as "the most wonderful man who ever lived on this earth". The agency also handles the literary legacy of the estates of Tennessee Williams, Hannah Arendt, John Gardner, Stanley Elkin and Aldous Huxley.

Among the agency's more than 200 authors are eight Pulitzer Prize and five Nobel Prize winners.

When he was asked what he looked for in a piece of writing, he had replied, "I just want to fall in love with it...You don't know until you have found it, but when you find it, you know."

== Death ==
Borchardt died in Manhattan on January 18, 2026, at the age of 97.

== Honors ==
On October 25, 2010, Borchardt was awarded the insignia of Chevalier of the Legion of Honour, France's highest award.

== Bibliography ==
- http://www.pw.org/content/agents_editors_qampa_agent_georges_borchardt
- http://www.frenchculture.org/spip.php?article3789
- http://www.thejewishweek.com/features/beginning/frances_honorable_agent
- http://gbagency.com/index.html
- http://gbagency.com/authors.html
- https://web.archive.org/web/20110622062951/http://www.themodernword.com/second_level.html
- http://frenchmorning.com/ny/2010/10/26/georges-borchardt-agent-dinfluence/
- http://www.nyu.edu/about/news-publications/news/2007/10/03/in_conversation_renowned.html
