= Kalimantaan =

1998 novel by C. S. Godshalk

- First edition cover
- Author: C. S. Godshalk
- Language: English
- Genre: Novel
- Publisher: Henry Holt & Company
- Publication date: April 1998
- Publication place: United States
- Media type: Print (hardback & paperback)
- Pages: 480 pp (first edition, hardback)
- ISBN: 0-8050-5533-9 (first edition, hardback)
- OCLC: 38024322
- Dewey Decimal: 813/.54 21
- LC Class: PS3557.O3145 .K35 1998

Kalimantaan is a novel by C. S. Godshalk offering a fictionalized account of the exploits of James Brooke in Sarawak on Borneo.

The novel won the 1998 Art Seidenbaum Award for First Fiction.

== Plot introduction ==
The novel uses of a variety of writing forms, including diary entries, letters, and straight narrative to tell its story. The author intentionally makes it difficult to determine what "really" happens in the story from dreams and fantasies of the characters.

== Plot summary ==
In 1839, an English adventurer arrived on the northwest coast of Borneo, commissioned to deliver a letter of gratitude to the Sultan of Brunei for having safely returned the crew of a British merchantman, lost on his coast. It was a region full of headhunters, pirate tribes, and slave traders. Most Europeans with the temerity to enter the region had never been heard from again. This particular adventurer, however, seems to know how to play one power against another and manages to keep his balance in the midst of chaos. After performing a service for the Sultan (resolving a local tribal conflict through the use of his schooner's guns and leading an organized assault on a small native river fort), he is named governor of Sarawak, subject to the Sultan of Brunei. Within a few years, he has become the Rajah of Sarawak, an independent state, and established a dynasty that will last one hundred years.

Godshalk has changed names and details while evoking a sense of the time, place, and atmosphere of the real events. The real adventurer was James Brooke; Ms. Godshalk's is named Gideon Barr. James Brooke's schooner was named the Royalist; Gideon Barr's is the Carolina (named after his mother). James Brooke was succeeded by his nephew, Charles Johnson, who took the last name Brooke. Gideon Barr is succeeded by his nephew Richard Hogg (Ms. Godshalk does not deal with the change of last name since her story focuses on Gideon's life and ends with his death).

Although many of the events described actually took place, one cannot simply change the names and read the novel as history. James Brooke's mother died in 1844, two years after he became Rajah. Gideon's mother dies in Borneo much earlier while he is in grade school in England, providing him an emotional link to Borneo James Brooke did not have. James Brooke never married a European, although there is evidence that he was married to a Malay woman. Gideon Barr marries an Englishwoman to provide himself an "air of permanence" as Rajah and we see much of the later portion of the story through Amelia Barr's eyes. Amelia Barr is fictional, but largely based on Margaret Brooke, wife of the second Rajah, and her book "My Life in Sarawak". Gideon also maintains a Malayan mistress who provides a note of tragedy in the way her presence poisons Gideon and Amelia's relationship.

On the other hand, the 30,000 pounds that Brooke/Barr inherited at his father's death which enabled him to acquire his schooner, the massacre of the sons of the Sultan of Brunei, the Chinese insurrection of 1857, and the commission of inquiry in Singapore all took place as described. The inquiry in Singapore was concerned with the battle of Labuan in which Brooke/Barr led British warships in a pre-emptive strike against a pirate fleet, breaking the power of the Bugis for the next twenty years. Brooke/Barr's enemies attempted to use this against him by claiming he had used British naval power to slaughter innocent natives.

Godshalk uses Malay words extensively in the book. While she provides a brief Malay glossary as an appendix, it does not cover all the words she uses. Enjoyment of Kalimantaan will be enhanced if one knows the following Malay words which are not in the glossary provided by the author:

Malay	English
abang	elder brother
adat	tradition, custom
ajar	to teach
berani, brani	brave, bold
besar	big, great
bulan	moon, month
bujang	bachelor
buaya	crocodile
bulbul	nightingale
datin	wife of a datu
datu	minister in traditional Malay government
dayang	woman of high rank
hantu, antu	ghost, spirit
hati	liver (as the seat of emotion, typically translated "heart")
ikan	fish
ikat	tie, knot
jaga	guard
jalan	street, road
kain	cloth (in the story, it describes a cloth belt)
kaya	wealthy, rich
kongsi	association, partnership
kris	stabbing dagger with flaming, or wavy, blade
kuli	unskilled laborer
lalang	a variety of long-bladed grass
lida	tongue
kecelakaan	misfortune, accident
merah	red
mudah	young, junior
orang	person
padang	field
padi	ricefield
pagi	morning
parang	cutlass, machete
payung (payong)	umbrella, parasol
pikul (picul)	1) a unit of weight of 133 lb (60 kg); 2) to carry on one's shoulder
puasa	fast, to abstain from eating
rajput	princeling, diminutive of rajah
sakit	sick
selamat hari	literally, "good day". Typically, the expression selamat siang (good mid-day) is used
selamat pagi	good morning
seluar	trousers, pants
si	generic honorific, e.g. Si Tundo
stengah	half
sudah	already, denotes past tense
tahun	year
tanah	earth, soil
tiba	to arrive
tuah	old, elder, senior
tuak	toddy, palm-wine
tuan	lord, used as an honorific, as in Tuan Barr
tunku	overlord, governor

Kampilan, actually a Filipino word, designates a long native sword.

== Release details ==
- 1998, USA ?, Henry Holt ISBN 0-8050-5533-9, Pub date ? April 1998, hardback
- 1999, Canada, Doubleday of Canada ISBN 0-385-25769-4, Pub date ? May 1999, paperback
