= C. S. Godshalk =

American author (born 1942)

- Born: 1942 (age 83–84) United States
- Occupation: Writer

Christina Soccolich Godshalk (born 1942), known mainly by her pen name of C. S. Godshalk, is an American writer. She was born and grew up in New York City and became a journalist before she began writing fiction. After living for nearly twenty years in Singapore and Southeast Asia with her husband and children, she published her debut novel Kalimantaan in 1988 after years of research. She has also published two short stories which were included in annual collections of The Best American Short Stories as well as travel essays.

== Kalimantaan ==
Kalimantaan is a fictionalized account of the exploits of James Brooke in Sarawak on Borneo. The novel received numerous positive reviews, including in The New York Times, the Los Angeles Times, the Chicago Tribune, and with All Things Considered on National Public Radio. It was reviewed in book review journals and included in the Publishers Weekly list of best books of 1998. It has been translated into Dutch, German, Polish, Spanish and Italian.

== Bibliography ==
- Kalimantaan. New York, Henry Holt, 1988. ISBN 0-8050-5533-9
- "Wonderland", in The Iowa Review, Vol. 17, 1987 (also included in The Best American Short Stories 1988
- "The Wizard" in AGNI 28, 1989 (also included in The Best American Short Stories 1990 and The Norton Anthology of Contemporary Fiction)
- "Tokyo", New York Times T Magazine, May 13, 2001

== Awards ==
- 1998 Art Seidenbaum Award for First Fiction
