= Zolotaryov =

Zolotaryov or Zolotarev, feminine Zolotaryova or Zolotareva (Russian: Золотарёв, Золотарёва), is a Russian-language occupational surname derived from the occupation of золотарь, or goldsmith. It may be transliterate in German as Solotaroff.

Notable people with this surname include:

- Aleksandr Zolotarev (1879–1938), Ukrainian politician, statesman and journalist
- Aleksandr Zolotarev (athlete) (born 1940), Soviet athlete
- Anastasia Zolotareva (born 2002), Russian tennis player
- Boris Zolotaryov (born 1953), Russian politician
- David Zolotarev (1885–1935), Russian anthropologist and ethnographer
- Karp Zolotaryov (fl. last quarter of the 17th century), Russian icon painter
- Vasily Zolotarev (1872–1964), Russian composer
- Vladislav Zolotaryov (1942–1975), Russian composer
- Yegor Zolotarev (1847–1878), Russian mathematician

== See also ==
- Solotaroff
