= The Collected Stories of Amy Hempel =

Short story collection by Amy Hempel

The Collected Stories
- First edition hardcover, 2006
- Author: Amy Hempel
- Language: English
- Publisher: Scribner
- Publication date: May 9, 2006
- Publication place: United States
- Media type: Print (paperback, hardcover)
- Pages: 432 pp
- ISBN: 9780743289467
- OCLC: 62741526
- Dewey Decimal: 813.54
- LC Class: PS3558.E47916A6 2006

The Collected Stories of Amy Hempel is a compilation of all of Amy Hempel's short stories published between 1985 and 2005. The collection was published by Scribner in 2006 with an introduction by Rick Moody. The book was a finalist for the 2006 PEN/Faulkner Award for Fiction and was selected by The New York Times Book Review as one of the 10 best books of 2006.

The collection includes Hempel's four previous collections: Reasons to Live (1985), At the Gates of the Animal Kingdom (1990), Tumble Home (1997), and The Dog of the Marriage (2005).

== Contents ==
Foreword by Rick Moody: "On Amy Hempel"

=== Reasons to Live ===
- "In a Tub"
- "Tonight Is a Favor to Holly"
- "Celia Is Back"
- "Nashville Gone to Ashes"
- "San Francisco"
- "In the Cemetery Where Al Jolson Is Buried"
- "Beg, Sl Tog, Inc, Cont, Rep"
- "Going"
- "Pool Night"
- "Three Popes Walk into a Bar"
- "The Man in Bogotá"
- "When It's Human Instead of When It's Dog"
- "Why I'm Here"
- "Breathing Jesus"
- "Today Will Be a Quiet Day"

=== At the Gates of the Animal Kingdom ===
- "Daylight Come"
- "The Harvest"
- "The Most Girl Part of You"
- "Rapture of the Deep"
- "Du Jour"
- "Murder"
- "The Day I Had Everything"
- "To Those of You Who Missed Your Connecting Flights Out of O'Hare"
- "And Lead Us Not into Penn Station"
- "In the Animal Shelter"
- "At the Gates of the Animal Kingdom"
- "The Lady Will Have the Slug Louie"
- "Under No Moon"
- "The Center"
- "Tom-Rock Through the Eels"
- "The Rest of God"

=== Tumble Home ===
- "Weekend"
- "Church Cancels Cow"
- "The Children's Party"
- "Sportsman"
- "Housewife"
- "The Annex"
- "The New Lodger"
- "Tumble Home"
- "Notes"

=== The Dog of the Marriage ===
- "Beach Town"
- "Jesus Is Waiting"
- "The Uninvited"
- "Reference #388475848-5"
- "What Were the White Things?"
- "The Dog of the Marriage"
- "The Afterlife"
- "Memoir"
- "Offertory"
- "Notes"
