= Lynn Solotaroff =

American translator of Russian literature (1929–1994)

- Born: Marilyn Adele Friedman; October 21, 1929; Brooklyn, New York City, U.S.
- Died: March 21, 1994 (aged 64); New York City, U.S.
- Education: University of Michigan; University of Chicago; Columbia University
- Occupations: Translator, teacher
- Spouse: Ted Solotaroff (m. 1950; div. 1963)
- Children: Two sons
- Parent(s): Estelle Tannenbaum (mother); Samuel J. Friedman (father)

Lynn Solotaroff (October 21, 1929 – March 21, 1994) was an American translator of A. R. Luria, Leo Tolstoy, Anton Chekhov, and Vasil Bykaŭ from Russian to English. She was also an academic and educator.

== Biography ==
She was born Marilyn Adele Friedman into a Jewish family in Brooklyn, New York. She later went by "Lynn", a shortened version of her first name. After completing high school in Erie, Pennsylvania, she attended Michigan State University. She then transferred to the University of Michigan where she graduated with a Bachelor of Arts in 1953.

On September 4, 1950, she married fellow Michigan student Ted Solotaroff. They had two sons.

In the mid-1950s, while her husband worked towards a Ph.D. in literature at the University of Chicago (U of C), Lynn Solotaroff decided to immerse herself in the Russian language. With financial assistance from the U.S. Defense Department—which was underwriting Russian training during the Cold War—she earned a Master of Arts in Russian at U of C. She then won a National Defense Fellowship to continue her graduate studies, initially intended to occur at the University of Washington in Seattle, but she switched to Columbia University when her husband obtained a job in 1960 with Commentary magazine in New York City.

In his book First Loves: A Memoir (2003), Ted Solotaroff describes his wife's intermittent bouts of mental illness, including hallucinations and suicidal thoughts. In the late 1950s, Lynn Solotaroff was admitted to the psychiatric ward at Billings Hospital at U of C, where she remained for several weeks. She was eventually diagnosed as suffering from bipolar disorder and treated with psychotropic drugs for the remainder of her life. The couple's financial struggles, combined with the strain of coping with her illness, resulted in a divorce in 1963. She did not remarry.

Lynn Solotaroff introduced English-speaking readers to the works of Soviet neuropsychologist A. R. Luria with her translation of The Mind of a Mnemonist in 1968. She followed that with translations of Luria's books The Man with a Shattered World and Cognitive Development. Among her other notable efforts, she contributed to Avrahm Yarmolinsky's translation of Letters of Anton Chekhov (1974), and provided new translations of Tolstoy's The Death of Ivan Ilyich and Vasil Bykaŭ's Pack of Wolves in 1981. She was a visiting scholar at Columbia's Russian Institute—later renamed the W. Averell Harriman Institute for the Advanced Study of the Soviet Union—and worked as its director of publications from 1977 to 1985.

In the last years of her life, Solotaroff taught English as a Second Language (ESL) at City College of New York and Touro College.

On Monday, March 21, 1994, Lynn Solotaroff died at the Jewish Home & Hospital in New York City from lung cancer and emphysema. She was 64. She was survived by her two sons from her marriage to Ted Solotaroff, and by two sisters.
