= David Evanier =

American author

David Evanier is an American author. He is working on a biography of Norman Podhoretz.

Thomas Mallon wrote in Newsday that Evanier's Red Love is "an irreverent novel about the case of Julius Rosenberg and Ethel Rosenberg" that was likely to "be greeted with howls of anger in all the predictable places. The Nation will be appalled, the Village Voice revolted."

== Bibliography ==
- The One-Star Jew (North Point Press, 1983)
- Red Love (Scribner's, 1991)
- Making the Wiseguys Weep : The Jimmy Roselli Story (Farrar, Straus, and Giroux, 1998)
- The Great Kisser (Rager, 2007)
- Woody: The Biography (St. Martin's Press, 2015)

All the Things You Are: The Life of Tony Bennett (Rodale, 2000)

Bobby Darin: Roman Candle (SUNY Press, 2025)
