= Charles Baxter (author) =

American novelist, essayist, and poet

- Born: Charles Morley Baxter; May 13, 1947 (age 79); Minneapolis, Minnesota, U.S.
- Education: Macalester College; University at Buffalo (PhD)
- Occupations: Novelist; essayist; poet
- Writing career
- Notable awards: Guggenheim Fellowship, 1985

Charles Morley Baxter (born May 13, 1947) is an American novelist, essayist, and poet.

== Biography ==
Baxter was born in Minneapolis, Minnesota, to John and Mary Barber (Eaton) Baxter. He graduated from Macalester College in Saint Paul in 1969. In 1974 he received his PhD in English from the University at Buffalo with a thesis on Djuna Barnes, Malcolm Lowry, and Nathanael West.

Baxter taught high school in Pinconning, Michigan for a year before beginning his university teaching career at Wayne State University in Detroit, Michigan. He then moved to the University of Michigan, where for many years he directed the Creative Writing MFA program. He was a visiting professor of creative writing at the University of Iowa and at Stanford. He taught at the University of Minnesota and in the Warren Wilson College MFA Program for Writers. He retired in 2020.

He was awarded a Guggenheim Fellowship in 1985. His short story "Snow" was included in The Norton Anthology of Contemporary Fiction edited in 1998 by R. V. Cassill and Joyce Carol Oates. He received the PEN/Malamud Award in 2021 for Excellence in the Short Story.

He married teacher Martha Ann Hauser in 1976, and has a son. Baxter and Hauser are separated.

== Bibliography ==
=== Novels ===
- First Light (1987). An eminent astrophysicist and her brother, a small-town Buick salesman, discover how they grew so far apart and the bonds of love that still keep them together.
- Shadow Play (1993). As his wife does gymnastics and magic tricks, his crazy mother invents her own vocabulary, and his aunt writes her own version of the Bible, Five Oaks Assistant City Manager Wyatt Palmer tries to live a normal life and nearly succeeds, but...
- The Feast of Love (2000) (Pantheon Books), a reimagined Midsummer Night's Dream, a story told through the eyes of several different people. Nominated for the National Book Award. A film version of the book, starring Morgan Freeman, Fred Ward and Greg Kinnear and directed by Robert Benton, was released in 2007.
- Saul and Patsy (2003). A teacher's marriage and identity are threatened by a dangerously obsessed teenage boy at his school.
- The Soul Thief (2008). A graduate student's complicated relationships lead to a disturbing case of identity theft, which ultimately leads the man to wonder if he really is who he thinks he is.
- The Sun Collective (2020, Pantheon Books). The lives of two very different couples—one retired, one in their twenties—intersect in Minneapolis around an anti-capitalist collective arguing for revolution, as an underground group of extremists wage war on the homeless. (Note: Briefly reviewed in the January 4&11, 2021 issue of The New Yorker, p.75.)
- Blood Test (2024) (Pantheon), Brock Hobson, an insurance salesman and Sunday-school teacher, finds his equilibrium disturbed by the results of a predictive blood test.

=== Short fiction ===
Collections

- Harmony of the World (1984). Winner of the Associated Writing Programs Award.
- Through the Safety Net (1985)
- A Relative Stranger (1990)
- Believers (1997)
- Gryphon: New and Selected Stories (2011)
- There's Something I Want You to Do: Stories (February 2015)

Stories (Note: Short stories unless otherwise noted.)

Title	Year	First published	Reprinted/collected	Notes
Created things	1992	Baxter, Charles (November 1992). "Created things". Harper's Magazine. 285 (1710).		

=== Non-fiction ===
- Baxter, Charles (Fall 1994). "Dysfunctional narratives". Ploughshares. (Note: Extract published as: Baxter, Charles (November 1994). "No-fault fiction : blame the Presidents". Readings. Harper's Magazine. 289 (1734): 13–15.)
- Burning Down the House: Essays on Fiction (1997)
- The Art of Subtext: Beyond Plot (2007). Winner of the 2008 Minnesota Book Award for General Non-fiction.
- Wonderlands: Essays on the Life of Literature (2022)

=== Poetry collections ===
- Chameleon (1970)
- The South Dakota Guidebook (1974)
- Imaginary Paintings (1989)

=== Edited works ===
- The Business of Memory (1999)
- Best New American Voices 2001 (2001)
- Bringing the Devil to His Knees: The Craft of Fiction and the Writing Life (2001)
- A William Maxwell Portrait: Memories and Appreciations (2004)

———————

Bibliography notes
