= Mary Robison =

American novelist (born 1949)

- Born: Mary Cennamo; January 14, 1949 (age 77); Washington, D.C., U.S.
- Education: Ohio State University; Johns Hopkins University (MA)
- Occupations: Novelist; short story writer; professor
- Spouse: James Robison (m. 1996, divorced)
- Children: 2
- Writing career
- Genre: Fiction
- Notable awards: Rea Award for the Short Story (2009)

Mary Cennamo Robison (née Cennamo; born January 14, 1949) is an American short story writer and novelist. She has published four collections of stories, and four novels, including her 2001 novel Why Did I Ever, winner of the 2001 Los Angeles Times Book Prize for fiction. Her most recent novel, released in 2009, is One D.O.A., One on the Way. She has been categorized as a founding "minimalist" writer along with authors such as Amy Hempel, Frederick Barthelme, and Raymond Carver. In 2009, she won the Rea Award for the Short Story.

== Life ==
Robison was born to patent attorney Anthony Cennamo and F. Elizabeth (Cennamo) Reiss, a child psychologist. She has seven brothers and sisters as well as a half brother. She was born in Washington, D.C., and grew up in Columbus, Ohio. From an early age she was interested in writing and as a child kept journals and wrote poetry as a teenager. She once ran away from home and journeyed to Florida in search of Jack Kerouac. She attended Ohio State University for college. Robison received her MA from the Johns Hopkins Writing Seminars, where she studied with John Barth. She has taught at numerous colleges and universities, including Oberlin, Ohio University and Harvard and is now a tenured professor at the University of Florida.

In 1977, The New Yorker began publishing her work, with the short story "Sisters." They have since published two dozen stories, many of which reappear in American anthologies. During the 1980s, she published the novel Oh!, which was made into a film by Paramount called Twister starring Harry Dean Stanton. Her other early work includes the short story collections An Amateur's Guide to the Night (1983) and Believe Them (1988).

In the 1990s, she suffered from severe writer's block and in an effort to overcome it, she scribbled her thoughts on thousands of index cards. These cards were reworked into the novel Why Did I Ever, which consists of 536 short chapters.

Her novel One DOA, One on the Way was chosen by Oprah Winfrey's Book Club for 2009 summer time reading.

Robison has been married twice. Her second husband was author James Robison, whom she divorced in 1996. She has two daughters by her first husband.

== Selected works ==
- Days: stories. Knopf. 1979. ISBN 978-0-394-50444-5.
- Oh! Knopf, 1981
- An Amateur's Guide to the Night: Stories Knopf, 1983, ISBN 978-0-394-52267-8
- Believe Them: Stories Knopf, 1988, ISBN 978-0-394-53942-3
- Subtraction, Knopf, 1991, ISBN 978-0-394-53943-0
- Why Did I Ever. Counterpoint. 2001. ISBN 978-1-58243-060-7. "mary robison."; reprint Counterpoint Press, 2002, ISBN 978-1-58243-255-7
- Tell Me: 30 Stories Counterpoint Press, 2002, ISBN 978-1-58243-258-8
- One D.O.A., one on the way: a novel, Counterpoint, 2009, ISBN 978-1-58243-305-9
