= Andre Dubus =

American writer

- Born: Andre Jules Dubus II; August 11, 1936; Lake Charles, Louisiana
- Died: February 24, 1999 (aged 62); Haverhill, Massachusetts
- Occupations: Short story writer; novelist; teacher
- Spouses: Patricia Lowe (1958-1970); Peggy Rambach (1979-1989)
- Children: 6
- Writing career
- Period: 1967–1998
- Genre: Literary fiction

Andre Jules Dubus II (August 11, 1936 – February 24, 1999) was an American writer of short stories, novels, and essays.

== Biography ==
=== Early life and education ===
Andre Jules Dubus II was born in Lake Charles, Louisiana, the youngest of three children of Katherine (née Burke) and André Jules Dubus, in a Cajun-Irish Catholic family. The author James Lee Burke is his first cousin. Dubus grew up in the Bayou in Lafayette, Louisiana, and was educated by the Christian Brothers, a Catholic religious order that emphasized literature and writing. Dubus graduated from nearby McNeese State College in 1958 as a journalism and English major.

Dubus then spent six years in the Marine Corps, rising to the rank of captain. During this time, he married his first wife and started a family. After leaving the Marine Corps, Dubus moved with his wife and four children to Iowa City, where he later graduated from the University of Iowa's Iowa Writers' Workshop with an MFA in creative writing, studying under Richard Yates. The family then moved to Haverhill, Massachusetts, where Dubus would spend the bulk of his academic career teaching literature and creative writing at Bradford College.

=== Career ===
Throughout his career, Dubus published most of his work in literary journals such as Ploughshares and the Sewanee Review, though he also placed stories in magazines such as The New Yorker and Playboy. Dubus remained loyal to the small publishing firm Godine until the end of his career, when medical bills forced him to switch to Alfred A. Knopf.

On July 23, 1986, Dubus was driving from Boston to his home in Haverhill and stopped to help two people at the scene of an accident. A third vehicle hit the three of them. Dubus' back was broken and both his legs were crushed. After a series of operations, his right leg was amputated above the knee, and he eventually lost the use of his left leg.

=== Final years ===
Dubus eventually continued to write after his accident and produced two books of essays, including Broken Vessels, which became a finalist for the Pulitzer Prize, and a collection of short stories. Dubus also conducted a weekly writers' workshop in his home.

Dubus died of a heart attack at his home in Haverhill in 1999, at age 62. He is buried in nearby Greenwood Cemetery.

== Influences and reputation ==
Dubus is identified as a Catholic writer, and as a southern writer, as he carried his heritage as a Louisiana Catholic throughout his life. His influences included Ernest Hemingway, Anton Chekhov, and John Cheever.

His short stories are recognized for their realism and humanism, their multi-dimensional characters and their complex view of the human condition. He is admired for his storytelling craft and his attention to tangible detail. His themes include the complicated sexual politics of the Catholic Church, and his subject matter falls roughly into the categories of childhood and youth; stories of military life; violence, revenge, and forgiveness; and fathers, marriage, and divorce.

== Personal life ==
Dubus was a devout Catholic and his life was marked by several tragedies. The rape of his daughter caused Dubus many years of paranoia related to his loved ones' safety. Dubus carried personal firearms to protect himself and those around him, until the night in the late 1980s, when he almost shot a man who was in a drunken argument with his son outside a bar in Haverhill, Massachusetts.

Dubus was married thrice and fathered six children. He married Patricia Lowe shortly after graduating from McNeese State College and entering the U.S. Marine Corps. The couple moved together to Iowa City while Dubus attended the Iowa Writers' Workshop. They had four children. Their oldest son, Andre Dubus III, went on to become in 2011 published a memoir, Townie, which tells of growing up in Haverhill and his relationship with his father. They divorced in 1970.

Dubus's second marriage was a brief union to his former college sweetheart, Tommie Gale Cotter, from 1975 to 1977.

Dubus married fellow writer Peggy Rambach in 1979. They had two daughters. In 1986, Dubus stopped on a Massachusetts highway to assist injured motorists and was struck by a car, leading to the amputation of one leg and permanent paralysis in the other. Despite his efforts to walk with a prosthesis, chronic infections led to him using a wheelchair for the remainder of his life, and he battled clinical depression. Over the course of these struggles, his third wife left him, taking with her their two young daughters in 1987 and divorcing him in 1989.

To help Dubus with mounting medical bills, in 1987 his friends and fellow writers Ann Beattie, E.L. Doctorow, John Irving, Gail Godwin, Stephen King, John Updike, Kurt Vonnegut, and Richard Yates held a special literary benefit in Boston and raised $86,000.

== Works ==
=== Short story collections ===
- Separate Flights (1975)
- Adultery and Other Choices (1977)
- Finding a Girl in America (1980)
- The Times Are Never So Bad (1983)
- The Last Worthless Evening (1986)
- Selected Stories (1988)
- Dancing After Hours (1996)
- In the Bedroom: Seven Stories (2002)

=== Novels and novellas ===
- The Lieutenant (1967)
- We Don’t Live Here Anymore (1984)
- Voices from the Moon (1984)

=== Non-fiction ===
- Broken Vessels (1991)
- Meditations from a Movable Chair: Essays (1998)

In 2018, Godine published all Dubus' fiction produced between the mid-1970s and late 1980s in three volumes: We Don't Live Here Anymore: Collected Short Stories & Novellas, Volume 1, The Winter Father: Collected Short Stories & Novellas, Volume 2, and The Cross Country Runner: Collected Short Stories & Novellas, Volume 3.

Italian writer and editor Nicola Manuppelli has translated six collections of short stories and novellas by Dubus for Italian publisher Mattioli 1885: "Separate Flights" ("Voli separati"), "The Times Are Never So Bad" ("I tempi non sono mai così cattivi"), "Voices From The Moon" ("Voci dalla luna"), "We Don't Live Here Anymore" ("Non abitiamo più qui"), "Finding a girl in America" ("Il padre d'inverno") "Dancing After Hours" ("Ballando a notte fonda"). For the publication of these works, Manuppelli has included introductions or afterwords by several American authors, including Dennis Lehane, Peter Orner, and Tobias Wolff, among others.

== Cinematic adaptations ==
The Dubus story "Killings" was adapted into Todd Field's 2001 film In the Bedroom.

The 2004 movie We Don't Live Here Anymore is based upon two of Dubus's novellas, "We Don't Live Here Anymore" and "Adultery".

Several writing awards are named after Dubus. His papers are archived at McNeese State University and Xavier University in Louisiana and at the Harry Ransom Center at the University of Texas at Austin.

== Awards and honors ==
- L.L. Winship/PEN New England Award (for debut collection Separate Flights), 1975
- Guggenheim Fellowship, 1976
- Guggenheim Fellowship, 1986
- Jean Stein Award from the American Academy of Arts and Letters, 1988
- MacArthur Foundation Fellowship, 1988
- PEN/Malamud Award for Excellence in the Short Story, 1991
- Pulitzer Prize, Nominee (for nonfiction, Broken Vessels), 1992
- National Book Critics Circle Award, Finalist (for fiction, Dancing After Hours), 1996
- Rea Award for the Short Story, 1996
