= Ted Solotaroff =

American writer, editor and literary critic (1928–2008)

Theodore "Ted" Solotaroff (October 9, 1928 – August 8, 2008) was an American writer, editor and literary critic. As a book editor, he helped shape the works of several prominent authors. He also founded the literary journal, New American Review.

== Life and career ==
Born into a working-class Jewish family in Elizabeth, New Jersey, Solotaroff served in the U.S. Navy from 1946 to 1948. He then attended the University of Michigan, where he was on the freshman basketball team, and earned a BA in English in 1952.

Solotaroff did graduate work at the University of Chicago, obtaining an MA in 1956, before entering the university's Ph.D. program. While there, he befriended fellow graduate student Philip Roth who recommended Solotaroff to The Times Literary Supplement; its editor Alan Pryce-Jones wanted an essay on American Jewish writers. Solotaroff's essay, published in November 1959, was noticed by Norman Podhoretz of Commentary magazine. In 1960 he hired Solotaroff (who never completed his doctoral dissertation) as an associate editor. He remained at Commentary for several years before joining "Book Week", the literary supplement of the New York Herald Tribune. He was its editor-in-chief until the newspaper's demise in 1966.

In 1967, Solotaroff founded New American Review, which became an influential literary journal. Published three times a year, it "operated as a kind of open house for fiction writers and practitioners of the new journalism". Its first issue featured works by 29 authors, including rising novelists like Philip Roth, William H. Gass, and Mordecai Richler, and nonfiction by Conor Cruise O’Brien, Stanley Kauffmann, and Theodore Roszak. For the decade of its existence, Solotaroff took the unusual step of distributing New American Review (its name was later shortened to American Review) as a paperback book, rather than in magazine format. When commenting on the 1960s literary ferment, he wrote:

[T]he market for serious writing cracked open in the Sixties and soon became a kind of howling forum where all manners of ideas, styles and standards contended for attention. As the literary climate altered radically, there was a distinct shift among writers and editors from a preoccupation with values as the ground of experience to a preoccupation with experience as the ground of values—a shift that was, of course, to be felt everywhere in America as the decade of opposition and revision careened along. For those, like myself, who entered the Sixties wedded to their values, the more or less standard ones of academic liberalism and humanism, but quite out of touch with their own experience, this breaking of the ice was alternately exhilarating and dismaying: one felt stirred but also swamped.

After American Review folded in 1977, Solotaroff became a book editor at Harper & Row. He edited manuscripts by authors such as Russell Banks, Sue Miller, Robert Bly, and Bobbie Ann Mason. In a statement following Solotaroff's death, Mason called him "one of the last of the great editors" and someone who "cared about every line". In 1989, the year that Rupert Murdoch bought Harper & Row, Solotaroff switched from senior book editor to a part-time position in order to concentrate on his own writing. In 1991 he retired fully from the renamed HarperCollins. As one obituary noted, "he left the book business with a parting shot at what he labeled 'the literary-industrial complex'."

In his last decade, Solotaroff published two memoirs. The award-winning Truth Comes in Blows (1998) "described a sad, blue-collar American childhood, bracketed by the Depression and World War II; a fractured Jewish world that mirrored the breach between him and his father." His follow-up volume, First Loves (2003), chronicled his courtship and marriage to Lynn Ringler in 1950s post-war America.

== Death ==
On August 8, 2008, Ted Solotaroff died at his home in East Quogue, New York of complications from pneumonia. He was 79.

He was survived by his fourth wife (of 28 years), Virginia Heiserman Solotaroff, as well as four sons.

== Awards ==
- 1999 PEN/Martha Albrand Award for the Art of the Memoir for Truth Comes in Blows.

== See also ==
- Lynn Solotaroff
- New American Review

== Bibliography ==
- Solotaroff, Ted, ed. (1969). Writers and Issues. New York: New American Library. LCCN 70017994.
- —————— (1970). The Red Hot Vacuum and Other Pieces on the Writing of the Sixties. New York: Atheneum Books. LCCN 70124982.
- ——————, ed. (1978). The Best American Short Stories 1978. Boston: Houghton Mifflin Harcourt. ISBN 978-0395271049. Co-edited with Shannon Ravenel.
- ——————, ed. (1982). Many Windows: 22 Stories from American Review. New York: Harper & Row. ISBN 978-0060909239.
- —————— (1987). A Few Good Voices in My Head: Occasional Pieces on Writing, Editing, and Reading My Contemporaries. New York: Harper & Row. ISBN 978-0060390754.
- ——————, ed. (1991). A Discourse on Hip: Selected Writings of Milton Klonsky. Detroit: Wayne State University Press. ISBN 978-0814319727.
- ——————, ed. (1992). Writing Our Way Home: Contemporary Stories by American Jewish Writers. New York: Knopf Doubleday Publishing Group. ISBN 978-0805241105. Co-edited with Nessa Rapoport.
- ——————, ed. (1996). The Schocken Book of Contemporary Jewish Fiction. New York: Schocken Books. ISBN 978-0805210651. Co-edited with Nessa Rapoport.
- —————— (1998). Truth Comes in Blows: A Memoir. New York: W. W. Norton & Company. ISBN 978-0393046793.
- ——————, ed. (2003). Alfred Kazin's America: Critical and Personal Writings. New York: HarperCollins. ISBN 978-0066213439.
- —————— (2003). First Loves: A Memoir. New York: Seven Stories Press. ISBN 978-1583225820.
- —————— (2007). The Literary Community: Selected Essays, 1967–2007. Riverdale-on-Hudson, New York: Sheep Meadow Press. ISBN 978-1931357593. Introduction by Russell Banks.
