= Richard G. Stern =

American novelist

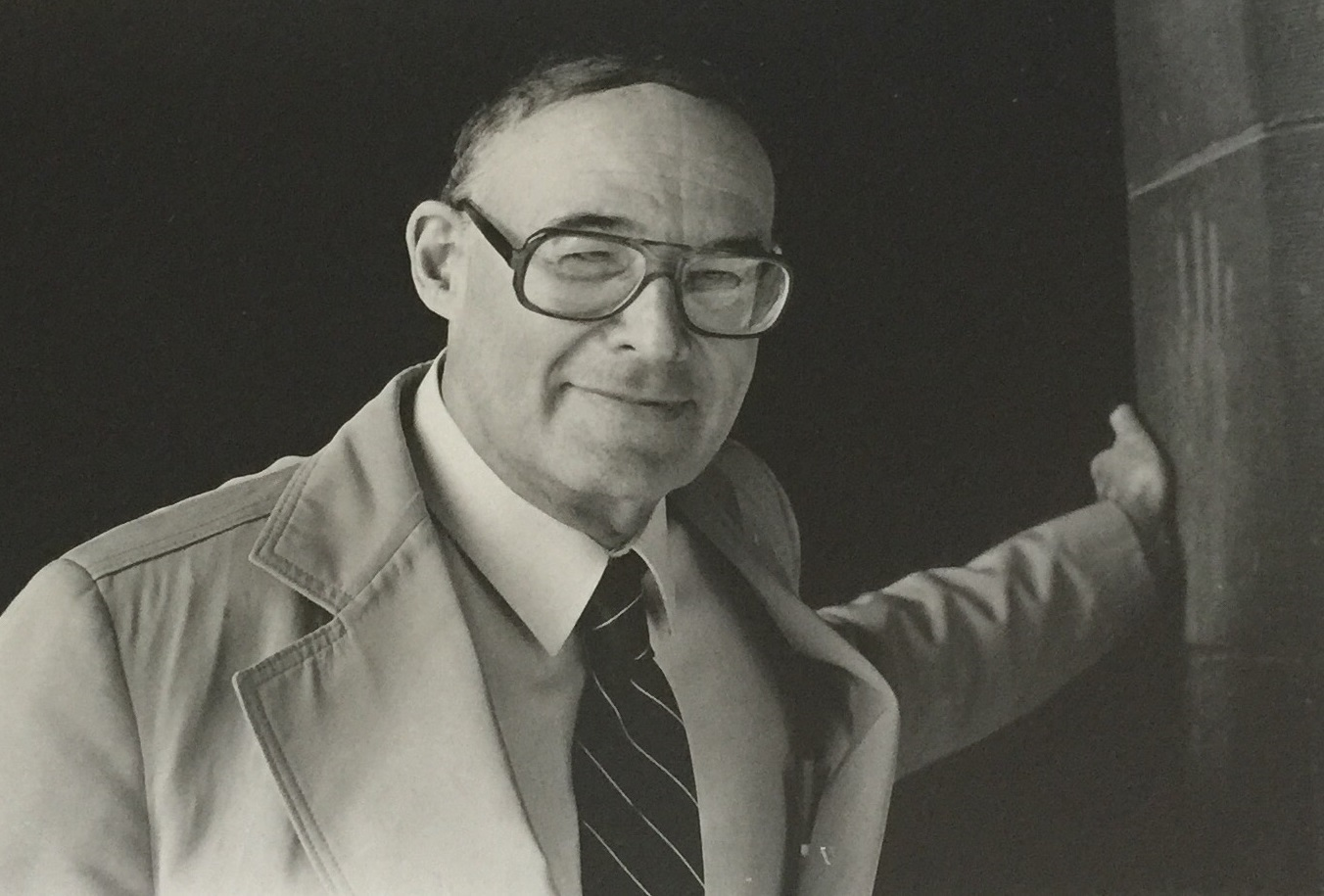
- Born: Richard Gustave Stern; February 25, 1928; New York City, U.S.
- Died: January 24, 2013 (aged 84)
- Education: University of North Carolina; Harvard University (MA)
- Occupations: Novelist; short story writer; educator

Richard Gustave Stern (February 25, 1928 – January 24, 2013) was an American novelist, short story writer, and educator.

Stern was born in New York City on February 25, 1928. He attended the University of North Carolina from which he graduated Phi Beta Kappa and magna cum laude in 1947. After a year working in Indiana, Florida and New York City, he went to Harvard University where he received an MA in English literature.

In 1949, he taught as a Fulbright Scholar in Versailles, France. From 1950 to 1951 he was an assistant professor and taught at Heidelberg University. From 1952 to 1954, he was a member of the Iowa Writer's Workshop and received a PhD from the University of Iowa in 1954. After a year teaching at Connecticut College in New London, he came to the University of Chicago where he taught from 1955 to 2002. He retired as Helen A Regenstein Professor of English and American Literature in 2004.

During his tenure at the University of Chicago, Stern was allegedly involved in the "suppression" of the "beat edition" of the Chicago Review (winter edition of 1958). At the time the Chicago Review was a student/faculty literary publication published by the University of Chicago. The editor then was Irving Rosenthal. The "beat edition" of the Review was to include excerpts from Naked Lunch, by William S. Burroughs, and a few Jack Kerouac stories. According to Rosenthal, Stern, along with Joshua Taylor, another faculty member, wanted to suppress the winter issue, being himself "so quick to protect the administration." (For reference to the case of censorship See The Beats, A Literary Reference, by Matt Theado, pp. 103, 104, 105, under the chapter titled "The Chicago Review and a Case of Censorship.")

Stern's own account of the "so-called suppression" appeared in "How I Think I Got to Think the Way I Think" in The Republic of Letters (reprinted in Still on Call, Stern's "orderly miscellany"). It recounts Stern's successful attempt not only to save the review (the University President at the time, Lawrence A. Kimpton, wished to stop funding the journal) but to keep the following issue from dropping any of the pieces (of Naked Lunch and other "beat" works) that had been accepted. Rosenthal and Paul Carroll, the Review's co- editors, founded Big Table, using submissions which Stern and the other student editors claimed belonged to the Review. (Oddly, Stern was invited to and did read at a fund-raiser for Big Table and published what he read in its second issue.) Furthermore, the previous issue of the Review included an excerpt from Naked Lunch along with work by other Beats.

In 1960, Stern published his first novel, Golk, then the novels Europe or Up and Down with Baggish and Schreiber (1961), In Any Case (1962), Stitch (1965), Other Men's Daughters (1973), Natural Shocks (1978), A Father's Words (1986), and Pacific Tremors (2001). There also have been short story collections culminating in his collected stories, Almonds to Zhoof published in 2004, his 21st book. Of this last book, a reviewer in the New Republic called Stern "the best American author of whom you have never heard." This indeed has been the tag associated with Mr. Stern for the last quarter of a century. "I was a has-been before I'd been a been," was a well-known self-deprecation as was the word of Richard Schickel that Mr. Stern "was almost famous for not being famous". Stern published another collection of essays, What is What Was, in 2002. Like his other essay collections, this one demonstrates that his astute observations in fiction are equal to, and derived from, his acute views on news and culture.

In 1985, Stern received the Medal of Merit for the Novel, awarded to a novelist every six years by the American Academy of Arts and Letters. Among his many other awards was the Heartland Award for the best work of non-fiction which Stern received for his memoir, Sistermony, published in 1995. Stern has been praised by many of the great writers and critics of the last fifty years, among them Anthony Burgess, Flannery O'Connor, Howard Nemerov, Thomas Berger, Hugh Kenner, Sven Birkerts, and Richard Ellmann, as well as his close friends Tom Rogers, Saul Bellow, Donald Justice, and Philip Roth (see Stern's essay "Glimpse, Encounter, Acquaintance, Friendship" in Sewanee Review, Winter 2009). He also enjoyed literary acquaintances and friendships with such figures as Samuel Beckett, Ezra Pound, Robert Lowell, Lillian Hellman, and Jorge Luis Borges. Some of Stern's students at the University of Chicago went on to become distinguished writers themselves such as Douglas Unger, Robert Coover, Austin Wright, Campbell McGrath, Peter LaSalle, and Alane Rollings, as well as the well-known journalists Seymour Hersh, David Brooks and Mike Taibbi.

At 80, Stern continued to write, and his books remain in print through Northwestern University Press and University of Chicago Press. From 2006 onwards he maintained a blog with The New Republic.

The most recent book about Stern and his work was published in 2001: The Writings of Richard Stern: The Education of an Intellectual Everyman, by David Garrett Izzo (McFarland Publishing). See also James Schiffer's study, Richard Stern, published by Twayne/Macmillan in 1993.

== Bibliography ==
=== Novels ===
- Golk (1960)
- Europe, or Up and Down with Baggish and Schreiber (1961)
- In Any Case (1962) aka The Chaleur Network
- Stitch (1965)
- Other Men’s Daughters (1973)
- Natural Shocks (1978)
- A Father’s Words (1986)
- Pacific Tremors (2001)

=== Short fiction ===
- Teeth, Dying and Other Matters (1964)
- 1968: A Short Novel, an Urban Idyll, Five Stories, and Two Trade Notes (1970)
- Packages (1980)
- Noble Rot: Stories 1949-1988 (1989)
- Shares, a Novel in Ten Pieces and Other Fictions (1992)
- Almonds to Zhoof: Collected Stories (2005)

=== Other ===
- Honey and Wax: The Pleasures and Powers of Narrative (1966) (editor)
- The Books in Fred Hampton’s Apartment (1973)
- The Invention of the Real (1982)
- The Position of the Body (1986)
- One Person and Another: On Writers and Writing (1993)
- A Sistermony (1995)
- What Is What Was: Essays, Stories, Poems (2002)
- Still On Call (2010)
