= Ronald Verlin Cassill =

American novelist (1919–2002)

- Born: May 17, 1919; Cedar Falls, Iowa, U.S.
- Died: March 25, 2002 (aged 82); Providence, Rhode Island, U.S.
- Occupations: Novelist; short story writer; editor; painter; lithographer; creative writing instructor
- Writing career
- Language: English
- Genre: Fiction

Ronald Verlin Cassill, known by his pen name R. V. Cassill, (May 17, 1919 – March 25, 2002) was a writer, reviewer, editor, painter and lithographer. He is most notable for his novels and short stories, for which he won several awards and grants.

== Life and work ==
=== Early years and military service ===
Cassill was born on May 17, 1919, in Cedar Falls, Iowa, to Howard Cassill, a school superintendent, and Mary Glosser, a teacher. He had two brothers, Donald Cassill and H. Carroll Cassill, and a sister, La Jean. After graduating from Blakesburg High School, he earned a B.A. in art at The University of Iowa in 1939, where he was a member of the Phi Beta Kappa Society. From 1942 to 1946, Cassill served the United States Army in the Medical Administration Corps as a first lieutenant, stationed in the South Pacific.

=== Studies, early writings, and art work ===
Cassill's wartime experiences culminated in his short story "The Conditions of Justice," published in 1947, and won him his first article in the Atlantic Monthly.

Cassill studied art at the Art Institute of Chicago in 1946. He mounted exhibits in Chicago in 1946 and 1948.

After studying in Chicago, he returned to the University of Iowa, earning his M.A. in 1947. In 1949, he briefly served as an instructor at the Iowa Writer's Workshop before attending the Sorbonne in 1952 for a year as a Fulbright Fellow, studying comparative literature. Cassill worked as an editor for the Western Review of Iowa City from 1951 to 1952, Collier's Encyclopedia from 1953 to 1954, and Dude and Gent in 1958.

Cassill wrote about 15 "paperback originals" in the 1950s and early 1960s. Assessing these early writings, The New York Times remarked that "Cassill shows that he can combine paperback storytelling at its strongest with subtle literary quality."

=== Teaching career ===
Cassill took up a lecturing position at the University of Washington in Seattle in 1955; in 1957, he taught in New York, where he became a lecturer at both Columbia University and the New School for Social Research. Between the shift of moving from the west coast to the east coast, Cassill met and married writer Karilyn Kay Adams on November 23, 1956. (An earlier marriage to artist Kathleen Rosecranz ended in divorce.) Together they had three children, Orin, Jesse, and Erica Cassill. Cassill returned to the University of Iowa in the same capacity in 1960 where he would teach for a few years at the Iowa Writer's Workshop. Notable students who took classes with Cassill at the Iowa Writer's Workshop during this time include Clark Blaise, Raymond Carver, and Joy Williams.

His next position was as writer-in-residence at Purdue University from 1965 to 1966. Cassill was appointed associate professor at Brown University in 1966 and then to Professor of English in 1972 where he remained until his retired from teaching as Professor emeritus in 1983. Cassill founded the Associated Writing Programs (now known as the Association of Writers & Writing Programs) in 1967. In addition to his teaching, Cassill served as U.S. Information Service lecturer in Europe from 1975 to 1976. During this time, he mounted another art exhibit in 1970. After retiring from Brown University, Cassill became the editor of The Norton Anthology of Short Fiction, retaining this position for nearly a quarter century, until his death.

In 1973, Cassill created controversy when his essay, “Up the Down Co-ed,” was published in Esquire magazine with the subtitle "Notes on the Eternal Problem of Fornication With Students." In it, he boasted about having slept with numerous young college women and lamented that the newly liberated women of the 1970s preferred men their own age. The Brown Daily Herald student newspaper subsequently published an opinion piece headlined “Verlin Cassill: Another D.H. Lawrence or Just a Dirty Old Man?"

=== Death ===
Cassill died at Rhode Island Hospital, Providence, Rhode Island, on March 25, 2002. At the time of his death, he was survived by his wife, two sons (Orin E., of New York City, and Jesse B., of San Diego), and a daughter, Erica Cassill Wood of Saline, Michigan; a brother, H. Carroll, of Cleveland, Ohio; a sister, La Jean Holstein of Ellsworth, Maine; and seven grandchildren.

== Awards ==
Cassill received The Atlantic's monthly "Firsts" prize for a short story in 1947. He won the O. Henry award for "The Prize" in 1956. He was given a Rockefeller grant in 1954 and a Guggenheim Fellowship in 1968.

== Themes and legacy ==
Cassill's career in writing and publishing included many of his interests and encompassed a wide scope. His stories and novels concern bucolic life in the Midwestern United States, as well as the life of the artist or academic, and at times extend into autobiography. A preoccupation with the fates of couples in alienation and union is exhibited in much of his fiction, as is the warring of emotional and rational impulses in individuals and pairs.

Cassill's papers are archived at the Mugar Memorial Library at Boston University.

== Selected bibliography ==
=== Novels ===
- The Eagle on the Coin (1950)
- Dormitory Women (1953)
- The Left Bank of Desire (1955) (with Eric Protter)
- A Taste of Sin (1955)
- The Hungering Shame (1956)
- The Wound of Love (1956)
- An Affair to Remember (1957) (as Owen Aherne)
- Naked Morning (1957)
- Man on Fire (1957) (as Owen Aherne)
- The Buccaneer (1958)
- Lustful Summer (1958)
- The Tempest (1959)
- The Wife Next Door (1960)
- Clem Anderson (1961)
- My Sister's Keeper (1961)
- Night School (1961)
- Nurses' Quarters (1962)
- Pretty Leslie (1963)
- The President (1964)
- La Vie Passionée of Rodney Buckthorne: A Tale of the Great American's Last Rally and Curious Death (1968)
- Doctor Cobb's Game (1969)
- The Goss Women (1974)
- Hoyt's Child (1976)
- Labors of Love (1980)
- Flame (1980)
- After Goliath (1985)
- The Unknown Soldier (1991)
- Jack Horner in Love and War (2015)

=== Short story collections ===
- Fifteen by Three (1957) (with Herbert Gold and James B. Hall)
- The Father and Other Stories (1965)
- The Happy Marriage and Other Stories (1965)
- Three Stories (1982)
- Patrimonies (1988)
- Collected Stories (1989)
- Late Stories (1995)

=== Other ===
- The General Said "Nuts": Exciting Moments of Our History—As Recalled by Our Favorite American Slogans, New York: Birk (1955)
- Writing Fiction (1975)
- In an Iron Time: Statements and Reiterations: Essays (1967)
- Intro 1-3 (1968–1970) (editor)
- Intro 4 (1972) (editor, with Walton Beacham)
- Norton Anthology of Short Fiction (1978–2001) (editor)
- Norton Anthology of Contemporary Fiction (1998) (editor with Joyce Carol Oates)
