= Stanley Elkin =

American novelist, essayist, and professor

- Born: Stanley Lawrence Elkin; May 11, 1930; New York City, U.S.
- Died: May 31, 1995 (aged 65); St. Louis, Missouri, U.S.
- Occupations: Novelist, professor
- Writing career
- Period: 1950–1995

Stanley Lawrence Elkin (May 11, 1930 – May 31, 1995) was an American novelist, short story writer, and essayist. His extravagant, satirical fiction revolves around American consumerism, popular culture, and male-female relationships.

== Biography ==
Elkin was born to a Jewish family in Brooklyn and grew up in Chicago from age three onwards. He did both his undergraduate and graduate work at the University of Illinois Urbana-Champaign, receiving a bachelor's degree in English in 1952 and a Ph.D. in 1961 for his dissertation on William Faulkner. During this period he was drafted and served in the U.S. Army from 1955 to 1957. In 1953 Elkin married Joan Marion Jacobson. He was a member of the English faculty at Washington University in St. Louis from 1960 until his death, and battled multiple sclerosis for most of his adult life. In 1968, he signed the "Writers and Editors War Tax Protest" pledge, vowing to refuse tax payments in protest against the Vietnam War.

During his career, Elkin published ten novels, two volumes of novellas, two books of short stories, a collection of essays, and one (unproduced) screenplay. Elkin's work revolves about American pop culture, which it portrays in innumerable darkly comic variations. Characters and especially prose style take full precedence over plot. His language is extravagant and exuberant, baroque and flowery, taking fantastic flight from his characters' endless patter. "He was like a jazz artist who would go off on riffs," said critic, writer, and Arts and Sciences at Washington University in St. Louis colleague William H. Gass. In a review of George Mills, Ralph B. Sipper wrote, "Elkin's trademark is to tightrope his way from comedy to tragedy with hardly a slip." About the influence of ethnicity on his work Elkin said he admired most "the writers who are stylists, Jewish or not. Bellow is a stylist, and he is Jewish. William Gass is a stylist, and he is not Jewish. What I go for in my work is language."

Although living in the Midwest, Elkin spent his childhood and teenage summers in a bungalow colony called West Oakland, on the Ramapo River in northern New Jersey not far from Mahwah, the home of Joyce Kilmer. This was a refuge for a close-knit group of several score families, mostly Jewish, from the summer heat of New York City and urban New Jersey. Elkin's writings placed in New Jersey were informed by this experience.

Elkin won the National Book Critics Circle Award on two occasions: for George Mills in 1982 and for Mrs. Ted Bliss, his last novel, in 1995. The MacGuffin was a finalist for the 1991 National Book Award for Fiction. However, although he enjoyed high critical praise, his books have never enjoyed popular success. The 1976 Jack Lemmon film Alex & the Gypsy was based on Elkin's novella "The Bailbondsman".

Elkin died May 31, 1995, of a heart attack, twenty days after his 65th birthday. His manuscripts and correspondence are archived in Olin Library at Washington University in St. Louis. Elkin's literary legacy is represented by the literary agency headed by Georges Borchardt.

He has a star on the St. Louis Walk of Fame.

== Works ==
=== Novels ===
- Boswell: A Modern Comedy (1964)
- A Bad Man (1967)
- The Dick Gibson Show (1971)
- The Franchiser (1976)
- The Living End (novella) (1979) ISBN 978-0525070207
- George Mills (1982)
- The Magic Kingdom (1985)
- The Rabbi of Lud (1987)
- The MacGuffin (1991) ISBN 978-0671673246
- Mrs. Ted Bliss (1995)

=== Story collections ===
- Criers and Kibitzers, Kibitzers and Criers (1966)
- Early Elkin (1985)

=== Novella collections ===
- Searches and Seizures (1973) (U.K. title: Eligible Men (1974))
- Van Gogh's Room at Arles (1993)

=== Other works ===
- "A Prayer for Losers", from the Why Work Series (edited by Gordon Lish) (1966)
- Stanley Elkin's Greatest Hits (anthology; foreword by Robert Coover) (1980)
- The Six-Year-Old Man (screenplay) (1987)
- Pieces of Soap (collected essays) (1992)

=== Limited editions ===
- The First George Mills (Part One of George Mills; 376 copies, all signed by Elkin and the illustrator, Jane E. Hughes) (1980)
- Why I Live Where I Live (essay; 30 unnumbered copies) (1983)
- The Coffee Room (radio play; 95 copies, all signed by Elkin and the illustrator, Michael McCurdy) (1987)

=== Audio ===
- "A Poetics for Bullies", read by Jackson Beck, with comments by Elkin, in New Sounds in American Fiction, Program 10. (edited by Gordon Lish) (1969)

=== As editor ===
- Stories From the Sixties (1971)
- The Best American Short Stories 1980 (with Shannon Ravenel) (1980)

== Awards ==
- 1995 – National Book Critics Circle Award for Mrs. Ted Bliss
- 1994 – PEN/Faulkner Award finalist for Van Gogh's Room at Arles
- 1991 – National Book Award finalist for Fiction for The MacGuffin
- 1982 – National Book Critics Circle Award for George Mills
