= Shannon Ravenel =

American literary editor and publisher (born 1938)

Shannon Ravenel (born August 13, 1938), née Harriett Shannon Ravenel, is an American literary editor and publisher. She is co-founder of Algonquin Books of Chapel Hill. There she edited the annual anthology New Stories from the South from 1986 to 2006. She was series editor of the Houghton Mifflin annual anthology The Best American Short Stories from 1977 to 1990. In 2026, Ravenel was inducted into the North Carolina Literary Hall of Fame.

== Early life and education ==
Ravenel was born in Charlotte, North Carolina on August 13, 1938, and raised in Charleston, South Carolina, as the daughter of Elias Prioleau Ravenel and Harriett (née Steedman) Ravenel. She entered Hollins College in Virginia as an English major in 1956. There she met Louis D. Rubin, Jr., who became chair of the English Department during her second year, and with whom she would later found and lead Algonquin Books of Chapel Hill. She graduated from Hollins in 1960.

== Career ==
After graduating from Hollins College, Ravenel moved to New York City, where she found a job as a copywriter for Holt, Rinehart & Winston. A year later she relocated to Boston, Massachusetts, where she joined Houghton Mifflin, initially as a secretary to the editorial staff and eventually becoming an editor of trade books.

During her time at Houghton Mifflin, one of the editors whom Ravenel assisted was Martha Foley, who had edited the Best American Short Stories annual anthology since 1941. When Foley died in 1977 the publishing house offered the series to Ted Solotaroff, who agreed to edit the 1978 volume but declined the permanent position, suggesting instead that the publisher use a different editor for each subsequent year. Houghton Mifflin agreed and asked Ravenel, who by then had moved to St. Louis, to act as series editor, a position she held through the 1990 edition, working with annual editors including Ann Beattie, John Gardner, Stanley Elkin, John Updike, and Margaret Atwood, among others. As series editor, each year she read an estimated 1500 short stories in magazines and literary journals, selecting 120 to send to the annual editor, who then chose 20 to appear in the volume. In 1990 Ravenel edited her own Houghton Mifflin anthology, The Best American Short Stories of the Eighties, which collected 20 stories that had appeared in the annual during that decade.

In 2026, she was inducted into the North Carolina Literary Hall of Fame.

=== Algonquin Books of Chapel Hill ===
In 1982 Louis Rubin wrote a letter to Ravenel proposing a new venture. "I am convinced (a) that publishing literary fiction is dying in NYC and (b) it can be done even so ... I am therefore toying with the idea of doing it myself." He closed the letter by asking if she would like to be involved in the enterprise and by Fall 1983 they had issued its first titles including a collection of short stories by Leon Driskell, Passing Through, and a memoir by Vermont C. Royster, My Own, My Country's Time. In 1986 Algonquin inaugurated its own annual anthology of short fiction, New Stories from the South, with Ravenel as editor.

As a division of Workman Publishing Company in 2001, Algonquin Books of Chapel Hill launched an imprint bearing her name, Shannon Ravenel Books. With Algonquin, Ravenel edited books by Larry Brown, Jill McCorkle, Lee Smith, Clyde Edgerton, and Julia Alvarez, among others.
