= Amy Hempel =

American journalist

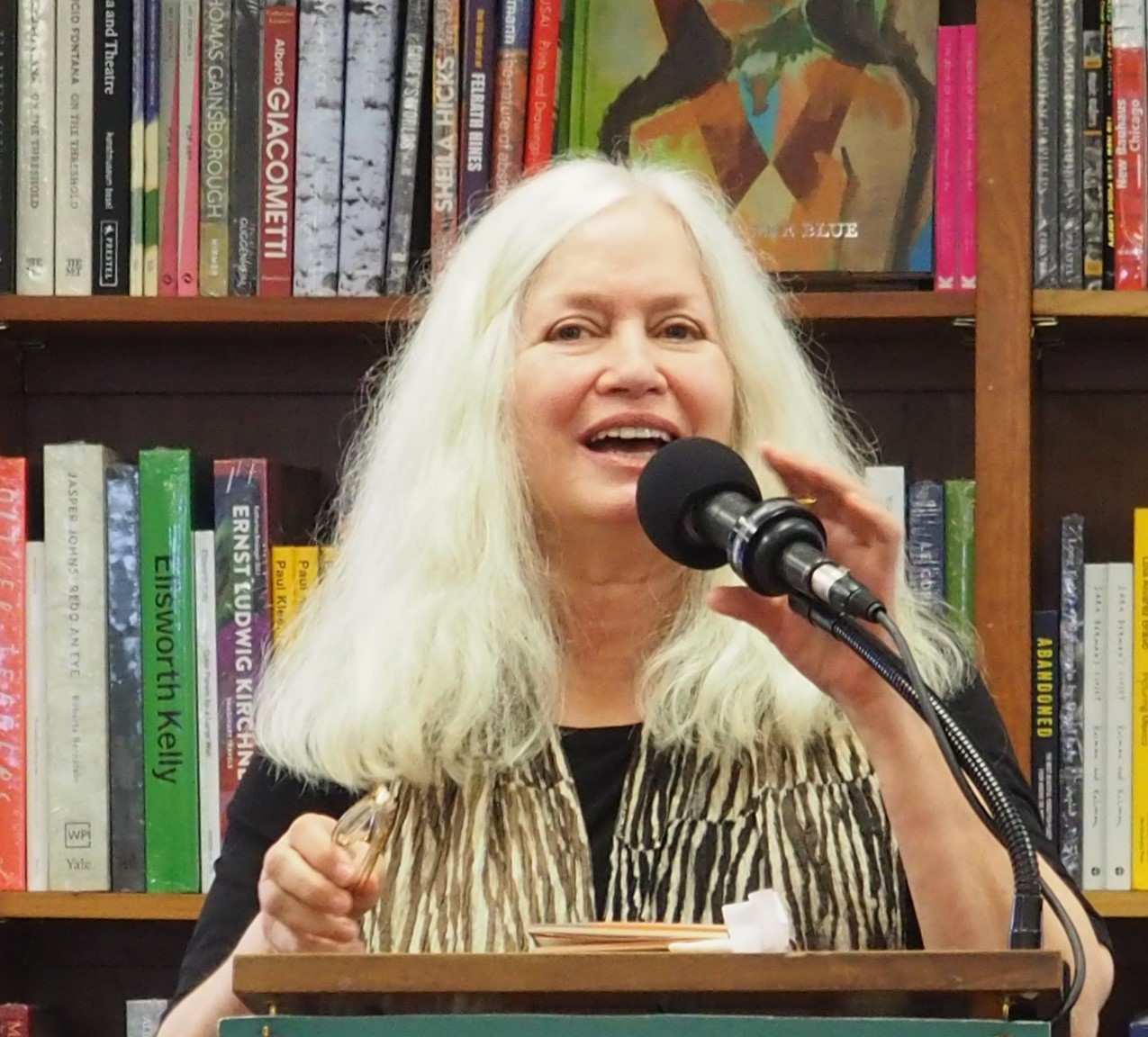
- Born: December 14, 1951 (age 74); Chicago, Illinois, U.S.
- Occupations: Short story writer, essayist, journalist, professor
- Writing career
- Genre: Fiction

Amy Hempel (born December 14, 1951) is an American short story writer and journalist. She teaches creative writing at the Michener Center for Writers.

== Life ==
Hempel was born in Chicago, Illinois. She moved to California at age 16, which is where much of her early fiction takes place. She moved to New York City in the mid-seventies. There, she connected with writer and editor Gordon Lish, with whom she maintained a long professional relationship. She formerly was professor of creative writing at the University of Florida. She was the Briggs-Copeland Lecturer of English at Harvard University from 2009 to 2014. Additionally, she taught fiction in the Low-Residency MFA Program in Writing at Bennington College. She has previously taught at Sarah Lawrence College, Duke University, The New School, Brooklyn College, and Princeton University. She is also a contributing editor at The Alaska Quarterly Review.

A dog enthusiast, Hempel is a founding board member of the Deja Foundation.

== Career ==
Hempel is a former student of Gordon Lish, in whose workshop she wrote several of her first stories. Lish was so impressed with her work that he helped her publish her first collection, Reasons to Live (1985), which includes "In the Cemetery Where Al Jolson Is Buried", the first story she ever wrote. Hempel credits Lish's influence for the lack of pressure she has felt to become a novelist rather than a short story writer. Originally published in TriQuarterly in 1983, "In the Cemetery Where Al Jolson Is Buried" is one of the most frequently anthologized stories in contemporary fiction.

Hempel has produced three other collections: At the Gates of the Animal Kingdom (1990), which includes the story "The Harvest"; Tumble Home (1997); and The Dog of the Marriage (2005). Tumble Home was Hempel's first novella, which she structured as a letter to an unspecified recipient and called "the most personal thing I've ever written." Both "In the Cemetery Where Al Jolson is Buried" and Tumble Home highlight animals' ability to express emotions and draw them out of people. In an interview in BOMB Magazine, Hempel explained, "I think there's a purity of feeling there that humans can connect with if we're lucky, or if we're looking for it."

The Collected Stories of Amy Hempel (2006) gathers all the stories from the four earlier books. She co-edited (with Jim Shepard) Unleashed–Poems by Writers' Dogs (1995), which includes contributions by Edward Albee, John Irving, Denis Johnson, Gordon Lish, Arthur Miller, and many others. She writes articles, essays, and short stories for such publications as Vanity Fair, Interview, BOMB, GQ, ELLE, Harper's Magazine, The Quarterly, and Playboy. Hempel has participated in several conferences including The Juniper Summer Writing Institute at the University of Massachusetts Amherst's MFA Program for Poets & Writers. In 2015, Hempel judged a flash fiction contest for Nat. Brut magazine.

Generally termed a minimalist writer, along with Raymond Carver, Mary Robison, and Frederick Barthelme, Hempel is one of a handful of writers who has built a reputation based solely on short fiction. Hempel purposefully leaves her stories' narrators unnamed, as "there are more possibilities when you don't pin down a person with a name and an age and a background because then people can bring something to them or take something from them." Despite Hempel's use of omission, which is characteristic of the minimalist genre, she prefers the term "minitaurist" to describe her style.

Hempel currently teaches in the MFA Program at the Michener Center for Writers at University of Texas at Austin.

== Awards ==
In 2000, Hempel received the Hobson Award and was awarded with a Guggenheim Fellowship. In 2006, she was awarded a USA Fellowship grant by United States Artists, an arts advocacy foundation dedicated to the support and promotion of America's top living artists. She won the Ambassador Book Award in 2007 for her Collected Stories, which was also named as one of The New York Times Ten Best Books of the year. Collected Stories was also a finalist for the PEN/Faulkner Award. In 2008, she won the Rea Award for the Short Story. In 2009, she received the PEN/Malamud Award for Short Fiction along with Alistair MacLeod. In 2015, Hempel received the John William Corrington Award for Literary Excellence from Centenary College.

== Bibliography ==
- Reasons to Live (1985)
- At the Gates of the Animal Kingdom (1990)
- Tumble Home (1997)
- Unleashed: Poems by Writers' Dogs (1999) (editor, with Jim Shepard)
- The Dog of the Marriage London : Quercus, 2008. ISBN 9781847242358, OCLC 883157641
- The Collected Stories of Amy Hempel New York: Scribner, 2006. ISBN 9780743289467, OCLC 470253093
- New Stories from the South 2010: The Year's Best (editor with Kathy Pories) Chapel Hill, N.C. : Algonquin Books of Chapel Hill, 2010. ISBN 9781565129863, OCLC 505423883
- The Hand That Feeds You (with Jill Ciment, writing as A.J. Rich), Scribner, 2015
- Sing to It New York : Scribner, 2019. ISBN 9781982109110, OCLC 1042476532
