= Going for a Beer: Selected Short Fictions =

Going For a Beer: Selected Short Fictions
- First edition
- Author: Robert Coover
- Publisher: W. W. Norton & Company
- Publication date: 2018
- Media type: Print (hardback)
- Pages: 416
- ISBN: 978-0393-60846-5

Going for a Beer: Selected Short Fictions is a collection of short fiction by Robert Coover, published in 2018 by W. W. Norton & Company. These stories were originally published in periodicals.

The pieces in Going for a Beer are selections from previously published volumes: Pricksongs & Descants (1969), In Bed One Night & Other Brief Encounters (1983), and A Night at the Movies, Or, You Must Remember This: Fictions (1987).

The collection includes Coover's most anthologized story, "The Babysitter."

== Stories ==
Those stories first appearing in literary journals or magazines are indicated.

- Introduction by T. C. Boyle (2018)
- "The Brother" (Evergreen Review, 1962)
- "The Elevator" (Cavalier, 1966)
- "The Wayfarer" (New American Review, 1968)
- "The Hat Act" (Playboy, 1968)
- "The Gingerbread House" (Playboy, 1969)
- "The Magic Poker" (Esquire, 1969)
- "The Babysitter" (1969)
- "Beginnings" (Harper's Magazine, 1972)
- "The Dead Queen" (Quarterly Review of Literature, 1973)
- "The Fallguy's Faith" (TriQuarterly, 1976)
- "In Bed One Night" (Playboy, 1980)
- "The Tinkerer" (Elements of Fiction, 1981)
- "You Must Remember This" (Playboy, 1985)
- "Aesop's Forest" (Iowa Review, 1986)
- "Cartoon" (TriQuarterly, 1987)
- "Top Hat" (Frank, 1987)
- "Inside the Frame" (Linden Press, 1987)
- "The Phantom of the Movie Palace" (Linden Press, 1987)
- "Lap Dissolves" (Linden Press, 1987)
- "The Early Life of the Artist" (Conjunctions, 1991)
- "The New Thing" (Iowa Review, 1994)
- "Punch" (2000)
- "The Invisible Man" (The Invisible Man, 2002)
- "The Return of the Dark Children" (The Harvard Review, 2002)
- "Riddle" (Kenyon Review, 2005)
- "Grandmother's Nose" (Daedalus, 2005)
- "Stick Man" (McSweeney's , 2005 [titled "A Child Again"])
- "Going for a Beer" (The New Yorker, 2011)
- "The Goldilocks Variations" (The American Reader, 2013)
- "Invasion of the Martians" (The New Yorker, 2016)

== Reception ==
Critic Dwight Garner at the New York Times, places Coover among "the postwar generation of postmodern experimental writers," and regards the collection as the best of Coover’s short fiction. He warns readers that “When Coover’s stories don’t work, which is about half the time even here, they’re dreadful—arid experiments that are the equivalent of lighting the wrong end of a filtered cigarette.”

Kirkus Reviews notes that the material in volume appear dated: "What was once daring may now seem a little tame, but Coover's influence endures, and this collection provides good evidence for why that should be so."

Novelist T. C. Boyle, in his Introduction to the collection, compares the stories metaphorically to healthy bivalves: "[O]ysters that are growing in fresh new beds and regenerating their pearls over and over again…"

== Sources ==
- Boyle, T. C.. 2018. Introduction to Going for a Beer. pp. ix-xiii. W. W. Norton & Company, New York. ISBN 978-0393-60846-5
- Coover, Robert. 2018. Going for a Beer: Selected Short Fictions. W. W. Norton & Company, New York. ISBN 978-0393-60846-5 https://www.newyorker.com/magazine/2011/03/14/going-for-a-beer Accessed 25 December 2025.
- Garner, Dwight (February 12, 2018). "Experiments Succeed—and Fail—Spectacularly in Robert Coover's Lab". The New York Times.
- Kennedy, Thomas E.. 1992. Robert Coover: A Study of the Short Fiction. Twaynes publishing, New York. ISBN 0-8057-8347-4
- Kunzru, Hari (June 27, 2011). "Robert Coover: a life in writing". The Guardian.
