= Coover =

Coover is a surname. Notable people with the surname include:

- Christopher Coover (1950–2022), American antiquarian book expert
- Colleen Coover (born 1969), American comic book artist and author
- Harry Coover (1917–2011), American inventor
- John Edgar Coover (1872–1938), American psychologist and parapsychologist
- Nancy Coover Andreasen (born 1938), American neuroscientist
- Pilar Sans Coover (born 1936), Spanish American textile artist, wife of Robert
- Robert Coover (1932–2024), American novelist and short story writer
- Sara Caldwell (born Sara Coover 1961), American screenwriter, daughter of Robert
