= Shootout at Gentry's Junction =

- Short story by Robert Coover
- Country: United States
- Language: English

Publication
- Published in: Evergreen Review
- Publication type: Literary journal
- Media type: Print (magazine)
- Publication date: June 1967

"Shootout at Gentry's Junction" is a short story by Robert Coover, originally published as "The Mex Would Arrive at Gentry at 12:10" in Evergreen Review (June 1967), and first collected in A Night at the Movies, Or, You Must Remember This: Fictions (1987) published by Simon & Schuster.

== Plot ==
"Shootout at Gentry's Junction" is told from a third-person point-of-view by a reliable narrator. Sheriff Henry "Hank" Harmon is the law in a fictional Western town of Gentry's Junction in the late 1890s. He is searching for the outlaw named "Mex" who he expects will arrive at 12:10 pm. Mex is already enjoying himself at a local saloon. The townsfolk have abandoned Hank to carry out his duties alone to take Mex into custody, despite his principled appeals for their support. Mex in the meantime enters the Sheriff's office and scribbles obscenities and urinates on official documents. After nightfall, Mex continues to torment, or perhaps entertain, the local residents.

Hank rides out of town to enlist the support of the town's wealthy banker, Mr. Gentry; the cowardly banker demures, but finally consents to follow him to town. Meanwhile, Mex is causing widespread mayhem, derailing trains and committing arson. He rapes the local school teacher in front of her students—the children heartily approving the assault. Mr. Gentry plays poker with Mex, stakes his family in wager, and loses them to the outlaw. Nonetheless, Gentry warns the outlaw that Hank is gunning for him. The sheriff visits the local minister at his church, and lectures the cowardly preacher on law, order, and morality.

Mex meanwhile is ravishing Hank's sweetheart, Belle, at the hotel. He departs just before Hank arrives; Belle seems nonplussed by the incident.

Hank prepares for the showdown and arrives on Main Street at 12:09 pm, where Mex is waiting for him. Hank approaches and disarms the outlaw only to discover that the outlaw has disarmed him. Mex shoots Sheriff Harmon in the face, killing him. As the sun sets, Mex rides out of Gentry's Junction, but not before hanging the preacher and the banker and leaving the community in utter ruin.

== Theme ==
The story is an unambiguous satiric parody of Hollywood Westerns, debunking its core cultural myths regarding "the triumph of law over chaos, of courage over cowardice, of good over evil.

The story's narrative concerning a stoic city sheriff struggling to enlist local support to confront a marauding Mexican outlaw invoke elements of High Noon, among other films of this genre.

Critic Elaine Kendall at the Los Angeles Times considers the story both a "devastating Hemingway parody" and a restrained treatment of the Manichean confrontation between Good vs. Evil in which "Coover merely lets the bad guy win."

== Sources ==
- Coover, Robert. 1987. A Night at the Movies, Or, You Must Remember This. Simon & Schuster, New York. ISBN 978-0434143900
- Kendall, Elaine. Book Review: "The Movies: Drawn and Quartered". Los Angeles Times, February 6, 1987. Accessed 10 December 2025.
- Kennedy, Thomas E.. 1992. Robert Coover: A Study of the Short Fiction. Twaynes publishing, New York. Gordon Weaver, General Editor ISBN 0-8057-8347-4
