= A Political Fable =

Book by Robert Coover

- Cover of the First edition
- Author: Robert Coover
- Cover artist: Abner Graboff
- Language: English
- Genre: Parody
- Publisher: Viking Press
- Publication date: August 1, 1980
- Media type: Print (Hardback)
- Pages: 88
- ISBN: 978-0-670-56309-8

A Political Fable is a 1980 novella by Robert Coover. It was originally published, in slightly different form, in New American Review in 1968, under the title "The Cat in the Hat for President", and was re-released under that same title in 2017.

== Publication history ==
Coover wrote the story during the time he wrote The Public Burning and finished it in 1967. He submitted the story to his editor Hal Scharlatt at Random House. Random House was also the publisher of Dr. Seuss and this parody of one of their most important authors and characters was strongly rejected: Coover was warned to not even try to publish the story anywhere. "Dr. Seuss was a multimillion dollar business for Random House, and they were taking no chances. ...There were no photocopiers in those days. Two typed carbon copies were about max for readability. I had sent the original and one carbon copy to Hal, kept the other one for myself. Hal didn't hesitate. He slipped his carbon to his friend Ted Solotaroff, editor of the new New American Review, who had already printed one of my stories in his second issue. 'The Cat' appeared there that autumn in the fourth issue, just ahead of the elections."

Dr. Seuss was asked to illustrate it.

The story was eventually published in hardcover by Viking Press in 1980, and published in paperback in 2017, with a new introduction by Coover, by Foxrock Books, the publishing arm of The Evergreen Review. The lead quotation is the story of Clark, taken from One Fish, Two Fish, Red Fish, Blue Fish, which appears with the permission of Random House.

== Plot summary ==
Mr. "Soothsayer" Brown, political kingmaker, narrates the story of how his party, certain to lose the upcoming U.S. presidential election against an extremely popular incumbent, finds itself transformed out of nowhere at their convention by the arrival of the Cat in the Hat, with the slogan "i can lead it all by myself". All set to nominate Riley and Boone, the better to run them again in four years, news of the Cat arrives, preceded by his maverick cheerleaders Ned and Joe. There follows seemingly endless merriment without any grown-ups in charge. Not even the Cat's legendary clean-up machine is sufficient. But the Cat wins just about everyone's favor.

Brown is a hold-out, though, and is disappointed that his long-term friend Governor Sam has switched over to the Cat. A meeting is arranged between Brown and Clark, the Cat's chief spokesman and campaign manager. They talk political philosophy, and Brown is helpless in the face of Clark's cynicism. At the nomination, the Cat rides in on roller skates, carrying a rake, with a cake, and so on, topped by the fish in the fishbowl who is scolding the Cat. The Cat falls down, and the bowl floods the entire convention, and everyone (except the Cat and Clark) end up inside the fish. Thinking quickly, Brown has everyone yell "VOOM", and out they all go.

The national campaign, with Sam (naturally called Sam-I-am) as vice presidential nominee, starts to the Cat's easy advantage. However, the Cat cannot control himself, and eventually manages to offend just about everyone with his antics. At a rally, Brown, Joe, and Ned are tarred-and-feathered, Sam is assassinated, and the Cat is captured by a mob and tied upside down. Try as they might, the mob cannot get the Hat off. They settle for skinning him alive, then roasting and eating him.

In the end, Brown's party wins, running Riley and Boone as originally planned, playing up the Cat as a martyr. Brown himself is the new Attorney General. He has one major fear. Clark is rumored to have recovered the Hat. And there are 26 more cats rumored to be inside the Hat.

== Related Dr. Seuss characters ==
In addition to the Cat and the scolding fish, other Dr. Seuss characters are alluded to.

- There is a Mr. Brown in Hop on Pop. Mr. Brown is also the title character in Mr. Brown Can Moo! Can You?.
- The original Clark is the big thing found in the park in One Fish Two Fish Red Fish Blue Fish. The associated lines from the book are quoted by Coover. The Dr. Seuss line "We will call him Clark" is hinted at when Coover's Clark introduces himself saying, "They call me Clark."
- Sam is explicitly called Sam-I-am, from Green Eggs and Ham.
- There is a Ned in Hop on Pop and in One Fish Two Fish Red Fish Blue Fish.
- There is a Joe in One Fish Two Fish Red Fish Blue Fish.

== Dedication and copyright ==
The book is dedicated to Coover's two daughters: "For Diana and Sara: We read it all by ourselves...". The copyright is in the name of the two daughters.

== Reception ==
...the sheer awful exuberance of the central absurdity here—which somehow, paradoxically, tempers Coover's naked loathing with Seuss' more good-natured mania—works to perfection: a devastating, across-the-board swipe at presidential imagery and campaign hype, perhaps even righter for Election '80 than it was for the more issue-centered nightmares of '68.

— Kirkus Reviews
