= Cooder =

Cooder is a surname. Notable people with the surname include:

- Joachim Cooder (born 1978), American drummer, percussionist, and keyboardist, son of Ry
- Ry Cooder (born 1947), American musician, songwriter, film score composer, and record producer

== See also ==
- Cooper (surname)
- Coover
