= Charlie in the House of Rue =

- Short story by Robert Coover
- Country: United States
- Language: English

Publication
- Publisher: Penmaen Press
- Media type: Print
- Publication date: 1980

"Charlie in the House of Rue" is a short story by Robert Coover, originally appearing in chapbook form by Penmaen Press (1980) and first collected in A Night at the Movies, Or, You Must Remember This: Fictions (1987) by Simon & Schuster.

== Plot ==
"Charlie in the House of Rue" is told in the third-person by a reliable narrator.

The story opens as Charlie—presumably Charlie Chaplin of the silent film era—enters a movie set representing a grand manor house and begins helping himself to food, liquor and cigars. He discovers that the domestic staff and visitors, rather than behaving as classic comic figures, are withdrawn, preoccupied or hostile. Charlie is at pains to enlist them in funny routines, and his increasingly desperate efforts lead to deaths and disasters.

Rather than ending in triumph for the Little Tramp, the comedian is demoralized and crushed by his failure.

== Theme ==
"We see Charlie as a modern anti-hero who lacks the resources to shape his own destiny. It is here, in the expansion of his character from the pathetic to the tragic, that Coover most clearly departs from the 'Little Tramp' character."—Literary critic Charla Gabert in "The Metamorphosis of Charlie," Chicago Review (1980).

The "Charlie" in the title—though unnamed—is comedian and filmmaker Charlie Chaplin of silent film era fame. Rather than eliciting laughter through a series of slapstick routines, Charlie finds that all his efforts to entertain end in grotesque and bloody homicides. The corpses finally induce expressions of mirth from the audience. According to critic Thomas E. Kennedy "[T]he piece evokes true existential terror in a world of timeless repetitions and unpredictable transmutations." Charlie, as the Little Tramp, is utterly dismayed at his predicament and bitterly weeps.

"Charlie and the House of Rue" reaches deep into the heart of the material for an experience far more moving than Chaplin was able or willing to try and, in doing so, turns popular culture into an astonishing piece of innovative art.

== Sources ==
- Coover, Robert. A Night at the Movies, Or, You Must Remember This. Simon & Schuster, New York. ISBN 978-0434143900
- Gabert, Charla. "The Metamorphosis of Charlie." Chicago Review 32 no. 2 (Autumn 1980). pp. 60–64 in Robert Coover: A Study of the Short Fiction. pp.135-139. Twaynes publishing, New York. Gordon Weaver, General Editor ISBN 0-8057-8347-4
- Kendall, Elaine. "The Movies: Drawn and Quartered". Los Angeles Times, February 6, 1987. Accessed 10 December, 2025.
- Kennedy, Thomas E.. 1992. Robert Coover: A Study of the Short Fiction. Twaynes publishers, New York. Gordon Weaver, General Editor ISBN 0-8057-8347-4
- Zonerman, John. 1982. Charlie in the House of Rue. American Book Review, January-February 1982. P. 24 in Robert Coover: A Study of the Short Fiction. p.134-135. Twaynes publishing, New York. Gordon Weaver, General Editor ISBN 0-8057-8347-4
