= The Brother (short story) =

- Short story by Robert Coover
- Country: United States
- Language: English

Publication
- Published in: Evergreen Review
- Media type: Print (magazine)
- Publication date: March–April 1962

"The Brother" is a short story by Robert Coover, originally published as "The Brothers" in Evergreen Review (March–April 1962) and first collected in Pricksongs & Descants (1969) by E. P. Dutton.

== Plot and theme ==
The story is a retelling of the biblical Noah in Genesis 6-9 that inserts the character of Nir, Noah's brother; Nir does not appear in Genesis. The tale is less about "fictional technique and theory" and more about reaccessing the Christian and Jewish religious heritage regarding "the shadow cast across humanity by God's decisions."

The story is told by Nir, a younger brother of Noah, Coover presents him as a decent-spirited fellow, a simple farmer struggling to support his pregnant wife. Skeptical about his brother Noah's project to build an ark and his improbable prophecy of a great flood, he nonetheless drops what he is doing to provide assistance. Too late he realizes that his brother is not a lunatic after all; faith and obedience to God assures the survival of Noah, his family, and the menagerie of non-human life forms he has assembled. When the flood comes, Noah denies the brother and his wife passage on the ark, abandoning them to their fate without regret.

Coover, in reassessing the significance of this mythology in contemporary terms "shift[s] sympathies from the spiritual to the existential." The bible story is turned on its head. Critic Thomas E. Kennedy writes:

It is difficult to imagine a reader whose sympathy would not shift to Noah's brother in this version of the story... Clearly God's judgement of humanity was incorrect... At least one good man and his wife are thrown to the flood, their charitable natures manipulated by Noah, their kindness unrewarded.

Though Noah's survival insures humanity's existence and that of the animal kingdom, those behavioral characteristics necessary for Noah to carry out this task required a brutality that remains evident in human society, "a fitting mythology for our world today."

== Sources ==
- Coover, Robert. 1969. Pricksongs & Descants. E. P. Dutton, New York. OCLC 438734283
- Kennedy, Thomas E. 1992. Robert Coover: A Study of the Short Fiction. Twaynes publishing, New York. Gordon Weaver, General Editor ISBN 0-8057-8347-4
