= The Origin of the Brunists =

1966 novel by Robert Coover

- First edition
- Author: Robert Coover
- Cover artist: Ben Feder
- Language: English
- Published: 1966
- Publisher: Putnam
- Publication place: United States
- Media type: Print (hardcover)
- Pages: 441
- OCLC: 25933015
- Followed by: The Brunist Day of Wrath

The Origin of the Brunists is Robert Coover's first novel, published in 1966 by Putnam. It tells the story of Giovanni Bruno, the lone survivor of a mine disaster that killed 97 of his co-workers, and the apocalyptic cult that forms around him.

The main action of the novel is set in and around the fictional town of West Condon. The disaster in the novel is closely based on the 1951 coal mine explosion in West Frankfort, Illinois.

In 2014, Coover published a sequel, The Brunist Day of Wrath, set five years later.

== Publication history ==
The Origin of the Brunists was first published by Putnam. Initially, however, the book was not released. The novel's editor had problems getting the dust jacket, then Putnam fired the editor and rejected the novel. The book was listed as an alternate selection of the Book-of-the-Month Club, but those who ordered it were told it was "temporarily out of print". When the novel won the Washington Post award for best first novel, Coover, upon contacting Putnam, was told "Yes, we've heard, but let's understand one thing right now, we are not spending another goddamned nickel on this book, is that clear?" Copies were made available, but the book would not earn back its $2000 advance.

It was published (1967, 1971) in paperback by Ballantine, and then republished (1978) in hardcover by Viking, paperback by Bantam, following the qualified success and notoriety of The Public Burning.

== Plot summary ==
=== Prologue: The Sacrifice ===
The End of the World is scheduled for the weekend, 18 and 19 April. The Brunists, trying to dodge media attention and hostile neighbors, engage in a reckless run on dark narrow roads, and one of their cars goes off into a ditch, killing Marcella Bruno, the sister of Giovanni.

=== Part I: The White Bird ===
On the evening of January 8, the night shift is beginning at Deepwater Number 9 mine. An explosion traps 98 miners. By the time rescue workers finish, they find only one miner still alive, Giovanni Bruno, but in a coma from carbon monoxide poisoning. A note from one of the miners, popular lay preacher Ely Collins is recovered, addressed to his wife:

I dissobayed and I know I must Die. Listen allways to the Holy Spirit in your Harts Abide in Grace . We will stand Together before Our Lord the 8th of

The Nortons, Wylie and Eleanor, have moved frequently. Eleanor's gift for over a decade has been to communicate with various spirits, the main one named Domiron, and this has always led to harassment until they leave. Eleanor is disturbed that she did not receive any clear warning of the mine disaster.

Justin "Tiger" Miller, editor of the West Condon Chronicle, leads the local newspaper coverage of the tragedy. A huge sports hero of the town in his high school days, he got out of West Condon, and inexplicably came back. His atheism is tolerated.

Abner Baxter runs his family in an abusive, fundamentalist way. He is Ely's successor as lay preacher at his church.

Part I ends with Bruno waking up.

=== Part II: The Sign ===
Eleanor Norton receives new spirit messages, convincing herself that Bruno is the key step forward in the cosmic order. In particular, he is no longer the human he was, but has come back as a spirit entity made flesh.

Bruno is released from the hospital, with the town celebrating, although he is mostly incapacitated. The Collins widow believes her husband forecasts the end of the world on the 8th of March, and invites people to the Bruno house for that evening, a Sunday. Many come, including Justin Miller, as a neutral reporter, and Abner Baxter as a lay pastor. But as midnight approaches, Baxter delivers an impromptu sermon condemning false prophets and walks out, leading most of the crowd away. The disappointment of the few who stay behind turns into elation when Bruno speaks a few words, "The coming ... of ... light! Sunday ... week", which is quickly interpreted as a new prediction of doomsday.

Two of the older Baxter children play at superheroes around town. Originally Batman and Robin, they discover a human hand and rename themselves Black Hand and Black Peter, and now play at being supervillains. They engage in criminal mischief throughout the town.

Miller starts an affair with a nurse, Happy Bottom. But he is finding himself slowly falling in love with Marcella Bruno. He is taking extensive notes on the Brunists, but is unable to find any story worth publishing.

A lawyer, Ralph Himebaugh, whose hobby has been the numerology of disasters over the years, comes to the conclusion that the Brunists have the last missing bits of information that dovetails with his years of research, and so he joins them.

Part II ends with the second apocalyptic meeting fizzling out, until the news comes that the Collins house was burning down.

=== Part III: Passage ===
The fire attracts a lot of attention, and forces the town leaders to face up to the Brunist cult, which is now calling for the end of the world on the 19th of April, the Sunday after Easter.

On the 8th of April, the Wednesday of Holy Week, Miller goes national with the story, bringing a lot of attention, both good and bad, to the Brunists and West Condon. Before the news actually breaks, Marcella visits Miller at the Chronicle plant after everyone has supposedly gone home. They come close to starting an affair, but Miller wants her to know what he has done, and asks her to run off with him. She feels entirely betrayed, and runs off. Unbeknownst to either of them, Lou Jones, Miller's chief reporter, was present and took photographs of them naked.

Jones is fired. The Chronicle plant is vandalized on Easter.

Part III ends with several little stories about how various West Condon residents are getting ready to deal with a second "Holy" Week, that of the Brunists.

=== Part IV: The Mount ===
National reporters are descending on West Condon. The Brunists are attracting new members, from nearby towns, nationally, and internationally.

Deepwater Clearwater, the mining company, announces its decision to not reopen the mine.

Several locals earnestly attempt to deprogram any Brunist that will talk to them, and mostly just worsen tensions. Himebaugh reacts wildly, destroying papers and documents.

Marcella takes to bed and refuses to eat the entire week.

The Brunists gather at a local hill Saturday night, leaving Marcella behind. But she runs to join them, following the lights on the dark road, and is killed when Abner Baxter, driving, knocks her into a ditch (this is the scene described in the prologue). Baxter is horrified, and on the spot becomes a fervent Brunist himself. Her body is taken up in an impromptu bier made from a lawn chair. Himebaugh is noticeably missing.

Miller, in the course of covering the event, overhears from an out-of-town reporter about how Jones is back, reporting for some other paper, and he's showing off nude photos of Miller and Marcella. Enraged, Miller finds Jones near the main circle of Brunists, and attempts to assault him. But the Brunists see Miller, and blaming him for the death of Marcella, they viciously beat him, until "he departed from this world, passing on to his reward," all while Jones photographs the attack.

Part IV ends with the town limping back to normal afterwards. The Brunists are not prosecuted, but are allowed to move on, entirely unwelcome in West Condon, although Abner Baxter defiantly holds secret meetings. In searching Himebaugh's house, his cats are found, almost all drowned in his bathtub, while Himebaugh himself is not found for some time, having starved himself to death hiding in the Bruno bedroom.

=== Epilogue: Return ===
Miller turns out to be alive after all, having been rescued by Happy Bottom. He is recovering slowly at the hospital. While he is all in favor of leaving West Condon, Happy won't hear of it. As motivation, she tells him the Brunists are certainly going to return on their first anniversary, knowing he will want to cover that story.

== Mine disaster source ==
On December 21, 1951, a major explosion about 8 p.m. at a coal mine in West Frankfort, Illinois, killed 119 men, and as in the novel, there was one survivor, who had been found with a small group separated from the rest. Also as in the novel, the local high school basketball game, begun at 7:30, was abandoned, and the gymnasium was converted into a temporary morgue.

Coover, at the time, was attending college in Carbondale, Illinois, two counties away. His family lived in Herrin, one county away, where his father was a newspaper editor.

== Awards ==
Coover won the 1967 William Faulkner Foundation Award for the "best first novel of the year." The three judges found the novel to be "both comic and serious, worldly and religious."

== Reception ==
It is a novel of intensity and conviction—even though he forgets which of his many stories he most wants to tell and cries uncle in the clutch.

— Webster Schott, The New York Times

He has written ... a full-fledged account of the origin and growth of a fundamentalist cult in a seedy Midwestern coal town, the corrosive effect on the town and the people in it, all culminating in an apocalyptic day of violence, disorder and hysteria.

— Thomas Lask, The New York Times
