= The Babysitter (1995 film) =

1995 film by Guy Ferland

- Promotional poster
- Directed by: Guy Ferland
- Written by: Guy Ferland
- Based on: "The Babysiter" by Robert Coover
- Produced by: Kevin Messick; Steve Perry
- Starring: Alicia Silverstone; Jeremy London; J. T. Walsh; Lee Garlington; Nicky Katt; Lois Chiles; George Segal
- Cinematography: Rick Bota
- Edited by: Jim Prior; Victoria T. Thompson
- Music by: Loek Dikker
- Production company: Spelling Films International
- Distributed by: Spelling Entertainment; Republic Home Video
- Release date: October 17, 1995
- Running time: 90 minutes
- Country: United States
- Language: English

The Babysitter is a 1995 American psychological thriller film directed by Guy Ferland and starring Alicia Silverstone, based on the short story of the same name by Robert Coover in his collection Pricksongs & Descants (1969). The film was premiered direct-to-video in October 1995.

== Plot ==
Jennifer is a beautiful teenager who is hired to babysit the children of Harry Tucker and his wife, Dolly Tucker, while they attend a party hosted by their friends, Bill Holsten and his wife, Bernice Holsten. Harry often fantasizes about Jennifer, while Dolly misinterprets Bill's compliments as a sign of attraction and fantasizes about him. Meanwhile, Jennifer's ex-boyfriend Jack, with whom she broke up when he started pressuring Jennifer for sex, runs into his estranged troublemaking friend Mark, Bill and Bernice's son, who once had a fling with Jennifer and still harbors feelings for her. Throughout the night, Harry, Jack and Mark have increasingly racy fantasies about Jennifer.

Jack calls Jennifer and asks to visit her at the Tuckers' residence, but she refuses. Mark later steals beer from Bill's party, where they run into Harry, who becomes fixated on the notion Jack might go to his house to have sex with Jennifer. Jack and Mark get increasingly drunk and show up uninvited to see Jennifer, but she refuses to let them in. They then spend the rest of the night stalking around the house and spying on her through the window. Meanwhile, Harry gets drunk and falls asleep in his car, where he has a nightmare of Jennifer and Jack having sex, which drives him to rush home and confront them. In his absence, Dolly makes a pass at Bill, who rejects her, but agrees to keep her secret and offers to drive her home.

At the Tuckers' residence, Jack and Mark force their way in while Jennifer is taking a bath and, after a tense argument, Mark knocks Jack unconscious and attempts to rape Jennifer, who runs out of the house. Mark pursues her and ends up being fatally run over by Harry, who is arrested for drunk driving just as Bill and Dolly arrive and hear about the accident. Before being escorted home, Jennifer tries to shut the car door before being stopped by Jack, and then she asks him, "What were you thinking?" before leaving an ashamed and guilt-stricken Jack behind.

== Cast ==
- Alicia Silverstone as Jennifer
- Jeremy London as Jack
- Nicky Katt as Mark Holsten
- J. T. Walsh as Harry Tucker
- Lee Garlington as Dolly Tucker
- Lois Chiles as Bernice Holsten
- George Segal as Bill Holsten
- Ryan Slater as Jimmy Tucker
- Brittany English Stephens as Bitsy
- Tuesday Knight as Waitress

== Reception ==
The Babysitter received negative reviews. On Rotten Tomatoes it has an approval rating of 17% based on reviews from 6 critics. Leonard Maltin gave the film two stars.
