= In Bed One Night =

- Short story by Robert Coover
- Country: United States
- Language: English

Publication
- Published in: Playboy
- Media type: Print (magazine)
- Publication date: January 1980

"In Bed One Night" is a short story by Robert Coover originally published in Playboy (January 1980) and first collected in In Bed One Night & Other Brief Encounters (1983) by Burning Deck Press.

The story tells the tale of a man who suddenly finds his bed overcrowded by a variety of people because of a mixup at the Social Security Office.

== Plot ==
Coover suggests that there is a link between social and ethnic background and the level of treatment one receives. Coover subtly questions whether or not the Social Security program is reliable and stable. Intentionally, Coover chose characters from all different walks of life to illustrate his message.

This is a postmodern story that challenges the formal conventions of punctuation and storytelling. The action in the story is fast-paced and provides the reader with few signals for plot progression, changes in points of view, and character dialogue. The story opens with a man in his bedroom winding down at the end of his day and getting ready for bed. When he lies down, his arm brushes against someone else. He looks over and sees a pale white-haired lady. He notices a lisp in the lady's speech as she starts speaking to him. The elderly woman tells him that all five of them have been assigned to be in one bed by Social Security. She goes on to explain to him that, with the current situation, no one can afford a private beds anymore because they are now luxury items. She advises the bed owner not to kick at night because her ailing brother Albert, who wears a cloth cap and long underwear of which one pant-leg is empty and pinned up to the rear flap, is sleeping at the foot of the bed. She believes that the man is lucky because he has his own bed in which he can sleep. The owner of the bed is surprised that Social Security has assigned that many folks. At the same time, the owner of the bed sees an Asian man whose work seems to be washing dishes.

At this point, another man named Duke, who appears to be a heavy-bellied worker, shows up with a woman of similar build. Both look like they are drunk. Duke and the woman crash onto the bed, hit the night-table, and knock the dentures into the air; and, as a result, the elderly woman goes and chases after them. Duke forces his companion to have sexual relations with him while everyone is still on the bed. She argues with him at first; but he finally overpowers her. Albert gets mad that Duke has a girl to himself. Duke gets so wrapped up in his sexual activity that he ends up kicking Albert in the face causing him to fall off the bed. The old lady tells her brother to get back on the bed while ordering Duke to kill the Asian person. Duke suddenly cries because he is thinking about the days of the past. Albert, then, crawls back onto the bed from the foot of the bed, and the pin that was holding up this empty pant-leg is now between his teeth. As the Asian person—who is holding a knife—crouches tremulously on the pillow by the headboard, the old lady tells Duke to forget about killing the Asian person because she now wants no violence. Duke feels some intense pain and manages to wipe his tears away.

A mother suddenly enters with three runny-nosed kids and begs to stay overnight because she and her kids are all tired. Duke tells her to stay and rest because tomorrow she will need to go to the social security office to request a new bed assignment. Duke starts to fade away wondering if he remembered the light in the bathroom and the cap on the toothpaste. At the same time, the old lady, with a lisp, suddenly shouts out in fear asking whether Albert has swallowed the pin.

== Analysis ==
"Coover skillfully orchestrates this pandemonium in a breathless, unpunctuated style...His fiction insists on asking where his own creativity comes from, and just as insistently answers that it exists only in the active process of writing and reading."—Critic Caryn James in Voice Literary Supplement (VLS) (December 1983)

In Bed One Night and Other Brief Encounters, the shortest and slightest of Coover's fiction is an example of "metafiction". Per Gass, metafictions are "the forms of fiction (that) serve as the material upon which further forms can be imposed." Coover's style causes the reader to shift one's gears, widen one's frames, and expand one's consciousness.

Robert Coover has an "affinity for the grotesque". Readers, as repressed and submissive human beings, tend to resist, flee, and fear the attitudes and myths of age, death, and other aspects of life; Hume indicated that, "By yoking the gross or upsetting with the ordinary, the comic with the tragic, Coover forces awareness of the cultural limits we have sublimated." Therefore, Coover "breaks the mechanisms of repression, reintroduces awareness of our submission, and tries to awaken us to the nature of our situation."

Coover's grotesquerie is evidenced in "In Bed One Night" by the whitehaired lady's explanation of the shortage private beds—a luxury to the world in the story. Readers of In Bed One Night, with knowledge of their society, suddenly enter into a world of fantasy; as a result, they shift their gears into thinking in a broader perspective—"the widening of frames". The readers will then realize that their government and society may have done something similar to what "the social security" does; hence, they are now experiencing what Heckard would call "the expanding of consciousness". Having sexual intercourse in front of others and killing a person who is of a different race do not appear to be out of the norm in the story's setting—the characters are not surprised at all about any of these deeds. As the readers visualize the scene in which the "heavybellied worker" and the "fat woman" are performing sexual intercourse or the scenes in which the old lady told Duke—the worker—to kill the Asian man on the grounds of his skin color. they are suddenly immersed into a "grotesque world, a world that looks respectable on the surface, but proves underneath to be what we have feared it to be all along. That such strangeness is indeed intrinsic to Coover's worlds is shown by the frequency of its manifestations and by characters' lack of surprise at these."

In this short story, Robert Coover utilizes "a range of polyvalent grotesquerie". Depending on "each reader's mental make-up, which in turn rests on ideologies and beliefs" outside Coover's control, the readers can interpret having sexual intercourse in front of others as indecent and killing a person based on racism is wrong or vice versa. Hume also asserts that the "instability of values also interferes with most readers' satisfaction, because they tend to like works they feel they have conquered and Coover's permit no such self-congratulation".

Coover's fiction maintains that the world cannot be objectively understood and that there is just too much to sort through—all the people in on world social security assigning too many people to one bed. In the face of an overwhelming amount of data people take another route: myth. Myth has the ring and feel of truth, but rational thought and objective analysis are not needed to put it into place and allow it to function. By accepting myths, people put themselves in a position where they feel as if they can go on with life and they have a place of stability from which to operate.

== Sources ==
- James, Caryn. "In Bed One Night & Other Brief Encounters". Voice Literary Supplement (VLS), no. 22 (December 1983). in Robert Coover: A Study of the Short Fiction. 1992. Pp 139-140 Twayne Publishers, New York. Gordon Weaver, General Editor ISBN 0-8057-8347-4
- Coover, Robert. In Bed One Night and Other Brief Encounters. Burning Deck Press, Providence, R. I. ISBN 978-0930901165.
- Kennedy, Thomas E.. 1992. Robert Coover: A Study of the Short Fiction. Twayne Publishers, New York. Gordon Weaver, General Editor ISBN 0-8057-8347-4
