= The Universal Baseball Association, Inc., J. Henry Waugh, Prop. =

1968 novel by Robert Coover

- First edition
- Author: Robert Coover
- Language: English
- Genre: Black comedy
- Publisher: Random House
- Publication date: 1968
- Publication place: United States
- Pages: 174
- ISBN: 9780246639820
- OCLC: 260921

The Universal Baseball Association, Inc., J. Henry Waugh, Prop. is Robert Coover's second novel, published in 1968 by Random House.

== Plot summary ==
J. Henry Waugh is an accountant living unhappily in an unnamed city whose only joy in life is a tabletop baseball game of his own invention: The Universal Baseball Association. Through complex interactions between various charts, Henry uses dice rolls to determine every aspect of his imagined eight-team league, from the pitch-by-pitch action of the games to the lives of the players. As the book opens, Henry has recently begun the 56th UBA season, with the details of its vast fictional history spread across various journals and spreadsheets in his apartment.

Henry plays out a game featuring a rookie pitcher named Damon Rutherford, son of a legendary former player. The dice rolls have Damon pitch a rare perfect game. This turn of events thrills Henry, as the game has lately been growing stale for him and the arrival of an apparent future legend is restoring his enthusiasm. While at a local bar, he fantasizes about the lives of the players in his league, all of whom have richly detailed personal lives and complicated political affiliations.

Eager to continue the season, Henry rushes through simulated games to Damon's next appearance. During this game, an unlikely series of consecutive dice rolls causes Damon to be fatally struck by a beanball. This outcome deeply disturbs Henry, who struggles to fit Damon's death into his imagined narrative. Henry's fantasies begin to grow dark, and he spends more time playing them out in his head than he does focusing on his real life. This concerns Henry's friendly coworker Lou, who starts attempting to insert himself into Henry's life.

Henry believes that deliberately interacting with the fiction of the league will ruin his immersion, so he makes small changes to try and negatively affect the career of the pitcher who killed Damon, Jock Casey. Nothing he does seems to work, as Jock's team wins more and more games and Damon's sinks to the bottom of the standings. Henry confesses his grief over Damon's death to Lou, who believes Henry is talking about a real-life relative. Growing more despondent, Henry begins rushing through games without taking his usual detailed notes. The fictional players, who have taken on a life of their own in Henry's head, struggle to reconcile the newfound vagueness of the world they inhabit.

In an act of desperation, Henry invites Lou over to play out a game between Damon's former team and Casey's, hoping that Lou's inexperience will cause the latter team to lose embarrassingly. While Lou struggles to understand Henry's complicated rules, he ends up doing well for Casey's team, much to Henry's chagrin. When Lou clumsily spills beer over Henry's books and charts, Henry furiously throws him out. Enraged, Henry fakes a dice roll which causes Casey to be killed by a line drive.

Some time later, the 157th season of the UBA is played out. At this point in its fictional history, the deaths of Damon and Casey have become folklore, treated as a parable of good versus evil. The league celebrates a "Damonsday" where incoming rookies play out a scripted version of Damon's last game. These new players seem to have a fatalistic awareness of their existence as characters in a game, and a sense of doom hangs over them as they step out onto the diamond. However, the new Damon finds renewed enthusiasm for the game as he takes the mound.

== Analysis ==
The novel is termed a "black comic" novel, as the book takes the reader back and forth between the real world and the fantasy world that Henry has created. The parts of the book that show us the "Universal Baseball Association" show us the fantasy world from the perspective, not of Henry, but of the players in the Association. Through these expositions, the players, managers, and league executives come to life.

Robert Coover's work here delves into deep philosophical issues, one of which is the notion of creationism. Henry, through his game, has become a "god" of sorts. His game determines who lives and who dies, who fails and who succeeds. It has been suggested that the name, "J. Henry Waugh", is a veiled reference to "Yahweh", one of the Hebrew names of God in Judaism.

== Critical response ==
John Sexton, president of New York University, called the book "the best book written about baseball by anyone", a "Joycean world, where a character has on his kitchen table a game run by the roll of dice, in which he's created an alternative baseball league that's more real to him than his life and real baseball ... And he has to decide whether he's going to intervene to change that or not. Now, doesn't that resonate to you about-- free will, free destiny?" New York Times writer Matt Weiland, writing about the 2011 reissue of the book, called it "one of the best baseball novels", commenting, "There is something terrifying about the U.B.A., but as with all tragedy it is a terror that once seen, and lived through, yields a stronger sense of being alive".
