= A Night at the Movies, Or, You Must Remember This: Fictions =

A Night at the Movies, Or, You Must Remember this: Fictions
- First edition
- Author: Robert Coover
- Language: English
- Genre: Short story collection
- Publisher: Simon & Schuster
- Publication date: 1987
- Publication place: United States
- Media type: Print (hardback)
- Pages: 187
- ISBN: 978-0434143900

A Night at the Movies or, You Must Remember This: Fictions is a collection of short fiction by Robert Coover, published in 1987 by Simon & Schuster. Many of the stories originally appeared in various periodicals.

== Stories ==
The formatting in the collection's table of contents is designed to resemble a Hollywood golden age theatre lobby poster listing the short stories as part of a program schedule: "previews, a serial, selected short subjects, a comedy, a cartoon, the travelogue, a musical interlude, and The Feature."

- "The Phantom of the Movie Palace"
- "After Lazarus" (chapbook by Bruccoli-Clark, 1980)
- "Shootout at Gentry's Junction" (Evergreen Review, June 1967, as "The Mex Would Arrive at Gentry's at 12:10")
- "Gilda's Dream"
- "Inside the Frame"
- "Lap Dissolves"
- "Charlie in the House of Rue" (chapbook by Penmaen Press, 1980)
- "Intermission" (Playboy, February 1987)
- "Cartoon" (TriQuarterly, Winter 1987)
- "Milford Junction, 1939: A Brief Encounter"
- "Top Hat" (Frank, Winter–Spring 1987)
- "You Must Remember This" (Playboy, January 1985)

== Reception ==
Describing Coover's fictions as "verbal wrecking balls" that "reduce cherished illusions to rubble," film critic Elaine Kendall at the Los Angeles Times cautions that the stories in this collection target not the Hollywood studio system, but the films themselves. As such, Coover's treatment may serve to undermine nostalgia for a number of iconic movies.

Reviewer Garner, Dwight at the New York Times singles out Coover's parody of Casablanca (1942) in "You Must Remember This" as "stupendously winning," adding "Coover's nostalgie de la boue—his longing for mess and degradation, literally his nostalgia for the mud—are close to overwhelming, in ways playful and less so."

== Retrospective appraisal ==
"A Night at the Movies stories reflect both Coover's skepticism and fascination about the power of American visual culture and lay bare the uncertain evolution of the relationship between media, film history, and literary language on the threshold of global televised communication."—Critic Pamela Mansutti in "Death, and Digital Jouissance in Robert Coover's A Night at the Movies" (2011)

Novelist and essayist Thomas E. Kennedy enumerates the "cinematic" themes that Coover examines in A Night at the Movies: "[N[ostalgia, memory, the pursuit of identity in metaphor, the function of film for contemporary American society."

The thematic and metaphorical coherence of A Night at the Movies gives it a unity not often seen in a short story collection.

== Sources ==
- Coover, Robert. A Night at the Movies or, You Must Remember This. Simon & Schuster, New York. ISBN 978-0434143900
- Garner, Dwight. "Experiments Succeed — and Fail — Spectacularly in Robert Coover's Lab". New York Times, February 12, 2018. Accessed November 1, 2025.
- Kendall, Elaine. Book Review: "The Movies: Drawn and Quartered". Los Angeles Times, February 6, 1987. Accessed December 10, 2025.
- Kennedy, Thomas E.. 1992. Robert Coover: A Study of the Short Fiction. Twaynes publishers, New York. ISBN 0-8057-8347-4
- Mansutti, Pamela. Attraction, Death, and Digital Jouissance in Robert Coover's A Night at the Movies. Source: symplokē, 2011, Vol. 19, No. 1-2 (2011), pp. 247–267. University of Nebraska Press. Accessed December 5, 2025.
