= Gerald's Party =

1986 novel by Robert Coover

- First edition
- Author: Robert Coover
- Cover artist: Carin Goldberg
- Language: English
- Publisher: Linden Press
- Publication date: 1986
- Publication place: United States
- Media type: Print
- Pages: 308
- ISBN: 0-671-60655-7

Gerald's Party is the fourth novel written by Robert Coover, published in 1986. The book encompasses a single night at a party given by the title character and narrator, Gerald. Though the murder of a beautiful actress is central to the plot, Coover's text has little in common with a traditional murder mystery. He appears to be approaching the murder mystery genre with the goal of subverting/exhausting its possibilities. A comparable strategy can be seen in his retellings of fairy tales (see Briar Rose, A Child Again), and his reframing of movie conventions (Ghost Town, A Night at the Movies). Like most of Coover's works, this is experimental fiction. The text regularly returns to themes of sex, violence, and a blurred boundary between theatre and reality.

== Plot introduction ==
As Gerald tries to describe the things around him in painstaking detail, he recounts simultaneous conversations and events as they happen by using a format similar to data packet handling. After describing a small part of a situation or a conversation, he moves on to a small part of a different conversation, then returns to the first conversation, or maybe moves on to a third or a fourth, returning each time to try to be as accurate as possible while recording the events.

== Major themes ==
The tone of the novel is humorous, and there are many puns, double-entendres, jokes, sight-gags, and deliberate ironies. There are also graphic depictions of various bodily functions, including different types of sexual intercourse. Gerald, speaking in what could be described as stream-of-consciousness, often appears unaffected by the decadent and orgiastic events that surround him, and, in addition, he comes across as an unreliable narrator.
