= In Bed One Night & Other Brief Encounters =

1983 short story collection by Robert Coover

- First edition
- Author: Robert Coover
- Language: English
- Genre: Short story collection
- Publisher: Burning Deck Press
- Publication date: 1983
- Publication place: United States
- Media type: Print (hardback)
- Pages: 59
- ISBN: 978-0930901165

In Bed One Night & Other Brief Encounters is a collection of short fiction by Robert Coover. The stories originally appeared in periodicals and were first collected in 1983 by Burning Deck Press, issued in a limited edition.

The pieces in the volume may be classified as prose poems ("proems") or "metafictional exercises".

== Stories ==
All the stories were first published in periodicals as indicated below.

- "The Debris" (Panache, 1971)
- "The Old Man" (Panache, 1973)
- "In Bed One Night" (Playboy, January 1980)
- "Getting to Wichita" (Oink!, 1976)
- "The Tinkerer" (Antaeus, Winter 1976)
- "The Fallguy's Faith" (TriQuarterly, Winter 1979)
- "An Encounter" (Panache, 1971)
- "The Convention" (Panache, 1977)
- "The Beginnings" (Harper's Magazine, March 1972)

== Retrospective appraisal ==
Journalist and critic Caryn James writes:

While these nine very short pieces don't amount to much in themselves, they are miniature demonstrations of the control Coover displays in his more substantial work. Like a literary juggler, he keeps all parts of his fiction in motion, balancing rhythm, word play, and the central image of the author creating his story. Or does the story create the author?

Essayist and novelist Thomas E. Kennedy notes that this collection, though the "lightest" and "slightest" of Coover's first three short story collection, contains works of "genius and originality".

== Sources ==
- Coover, Robert. In Bed One Night and Other Brief Encounters. Burning Deck Press, Providence, R. I. ISBN 978-0930901165.
- James, Caryn. 1983. "In Bed One Night & Other Brief Encounters." Voice Literary Supplement (VLS), no. 22 (December 1983). in Robert Coover: A Study of the Short Fiction. 1992. Pp 139–140. Twaynes publishers, New York. Gordon Weaver, General Editor ISBN 0-8057-8347-4
- Kennedy, Thomas E.. 1992. Robert Coover: A Study of the Short Fiction. Twaynes publishing, New York. ISBN 0-8057-8347-4
