= The Adventures of Lucky Pierre (novel) =

2002 novel by Robert Coover

The Adventures of Lucky Pierre: Director's Cut
- First edition
- Author: Robert Coover
- Cover artist: Charles Rue Woods and Marcia Salo, based on a Duane Reider/Getty Images photograph
- Language: English
- Genre: Post-modern erotica
- Published: 2002
- Publisher: Grove Press
- Publication place: United States
- Media type: Print (hardcover)
- Pages: 405
- ISBN: 978-0-8021-1724-3

The Adventures of Lucky Pierre: Director's Cut is a novel by Robert Coover, published in 2002. The title is the same as a 1961 nudie cutie film, and like the film, the novel is divided into multiple vignettes, starring the title character Pierre.

The subtitle is an allusion to the now widespread practice of releasing director's cuts in addition to final cuts. There is no director's cut for the film.

An alternate subtitle "Raw Footage," had been used until publication, including the advanced reading copies. Several reviews were published with the alternate subtitle, while illustrating the book cover with the final subtitle. See, for example, Publishers Weekly. See also Internet Archive.

Unlike the film, the novel has an overriding metafictional theme, driven by Pierre seeking to escape from fiction.

== Excerpts ==
Lucky Pierre was written over a period of thirty years, with numerous excerpts published separately.

Three excerpts were published in Golden Handcuffs Review, vol. 1, Winter 2002–03:

- "The Wedding of Lucky Pierre".
- "Home Movies: Lucky Pierre and the Phantom Ass".
- "Lucky Pierre in the Bath".

== Dedication ==
The novel was dedicated to "Saint Buster, Saint Luis, and Saint Jean-Luc." These are Buster Keaton, Luis Buñuel, Jean-Luc Godard, as is clear from a brief interview Coover gave in The New Yorker, where he mentioned the dedication, and said several of their films would be in his top fifty.

== Organization ==
The novel is divided into nine chapters, called "reels". (The first chapter also includes the "titles".) Each reel is named for the woman director who is controlling Pierre for that chapter. In the ninth reel, all nine women are present, parading in Greek costume, identifying themselves as the nine muses:

Director	Nickname	Muse
Cecilia	Cissy	Euterpe
Cleo		Clio
Clara		Urania
Cassandra	Cassie	Polyhymnia
Constance	Connie	Erato
Carlotta	Lottie	Melpomene
Cora		Terpsichore
Catherine	Kate	Thalia
Calliope	Cally	Calliope

== Reception ==
Robert Coover remains our foremost verbal wizard, our laugher in the dark, Samuel Beckett reborn: Lucky Pierre is a hilarious, radical, and essential book.

— T. Coraghessan Boyle

Coover ... returns with this metafictional romp through a fantastic city where art is the highest form of reality. The title character appears in nine movies whose female directors cast him in diverse sexual roles running the gamut from the creative to the perverse. ... A meditation on truth and a narrative in the high postmodern style ...

— Philip Santo, Library Journal, 2002

A wild, pornographic, funny, postmodern rant ... In the tradition of Tristram Shandy or Finnegans Wake, this is a story that can be opened at any point and read at length with great pleasure.

— ?, Kirkus Reviews, 2002
