= The Brunist Day of Wrath =

English-language novel

- First edition cover
- Author: Robert Coover
- Cover artist: Alessandro Calzolaro
- Language: English
- Published: 2014
- Publisher: Dzanc Books
- Publication place: United States
- Media type: Print (hardcover)
- Pages: 1005
- ISBN: 978-1-938604-38-6
- Preceded by: The Origin of the Brunists

The Brunist Day of Wrath is Robert Coover's tenth novel. It is a sequel to the 1966 novel The Origin of the Brunists, which told the story of Giovanni Bruno, the lone survivor of a mine disaster that killed 97 of his co-workers, and the first several months of the apocalyptic cult that formed around him, ending in their disastrous scattering. The Brunist Day of Wrath is set five years later, as the cult returns to West Condon.

Coover had the idea for the sequel while writing The Origin of the Brunists, and has stated that "it might be said that all my writing has been written in Wrath's shadow." He took notes over the years, but concentrated on his other writings, until the 2000 election of Bush and the power of the religious right in American politics inspired him to take the sequel much more seriously.

== Excerpts ==
Excerpts have appeared in Conjunctions, Harper's, Western Humanities Review, Kenyon Review, Five Dials, FlashPoint, and Golden Handcuffs Review.

- White-bread Jesus, Harper's Magazine, 12/2008
- Joshua J. Jenkins Meets Jesus Christ, Western Humanities Review, Summer 2013
- The Dance of the Annunciation, Kenyon Review, Fall 2013
- Cockcrow to High Noon, Golden Handcuffs Review, Fall–Winter 2013–4

== Plot summary ==
In the five years since the events of The Origin of the Brunists, the religion has grown, except in West Condon. Justin Miller has left town, taking a job with network TV. Abner Baxter has also left town, openly preaching Brunist. Eleanor Norton has written a successful book on Domiron and the Brunists. The teenage orphan Colin Meredith, after his rescue from the Brunists, was committed to the same mental hospital with Giovanni Bruno. Clara Collins, widow of Ely, has married Ben Wosznik.

The mine entrance area, known as the "Mount of Redemption" to the Brunists, has been idle. The Reverend Wesley Edwards' Presbyterian church sold off their long unused camp grounds to local mine boss John P. Suggs, not knowing he was a Brunist sympathizer. Edwards' wife Debra makes Colin's redemption her great project, wrecking her marriage.

Colin had seen Bruno being wheeled out of the institute after surgery, and reports he is dead.

=== Prologue ===
On July 7, the Reverend Joshua Jehoshaphat Jenkins, fresh out of Presbyterian seminary, is riding a bus to his first ministerial appointment. Expected to be met by Ted Cavanaugh, the town banker, at the bus station, he finds no one waiting and no message for him, so he leaves his stuff at the station and goes exploring West Condon on his own.

Along the way, a driver for a lost army convoy asks Jenkins for directions to the high school, and when he shows him the only map he has, the driver assumes it was meant as a gift and takes it and leaves. Jenkins finds his church, and since it is open, enters. He finds Jesus at the pulpit waiting for him. They talk a bit, then a woman enters, similarly garbed as Jesus, tells him "those awful people are marching up that hill again," with guns, and recommends they hide in the basement. Jesus decides to proceed onwards to the "infamous hill", since they are likely waiting for him, and over the woman's objections ("they're completely crazy!") invites Jenkins to join him.

=== Book I ===
On Sunday, 29 March, a very brief Easter sunrise outdoor service on a mud hill in the pouring rain is ended by a tremendous lightning-clap. Reverend Wesley has great difficulty leaving and is helped by Cavanaugh. Wesley has great difficulty controlling his inner Jesus, is deemed too senile to continue, and is being edged out of his duties. His wife Debra has openly left him for the Brunists, and his only supporter is Priscilla Tindle, church organist, who resumes their brief affair.

The Brunists are rebuilding the former Presbyterian camp near the closed mine, in anticipation of a large crowd of followers showing up for the fifth anniversary of the Day of Redemption. Among the new people are Darren Rector, who is obsessive about Brunist numerology, eschatology and history, and Billy Don Tebbert, Darren's friend and disciple.

Georgie Lucci, who survived the mine disaster and left town, has just returned to West Condon, a failure in the big city, moves in with his mother and is a failure again. He finds employment as the frontman for the city's fire inspection shakedown scam.

Cavanaugh has problems on many levels. His wife Irene is dying, and has lapsed into an impenetrable fundamentalist mindset. He has to engineer the removal and replacement of the Reverend Edwards. His son Tommy, on Easter break from college, shows no aptitude for business, and is so obviously only interested in girls that he can't even let him work at the bank. He is trying to prevent the Brunist revival, partly made possible by his unthinking approval of the land sale his church had made the previous winter. Cavanaugh starts an affair with Stacy Ryder, an intern who is gifted as his girl Friday at the bank, and is also an older friend of Angela Bonali, who is renewing her own affair with Tommy. Driving back from meeting Stacy in a hotel an hour away on dark roads, Cavanaugh is attacked by the Warrior Apostles, a motorcycle gang.

On Saturday, April 18, Brunists from across the country start arriving in force. This includes Abner Baxter and his family, including son Nathan, who is a member of the Warrior Apostles, who come with Nathan. The motorcycle gang robs some Brunist living quarters, and are expelled the next morning when their crime is discovered. Nathan's younger brother Paulie chooses to ride with the gang.

On Sunday morning, Abner Baxter, Jr., and Elaine Collins engage in mutual flagellation.

A crowd of townspeople, reporters, and law enforcement show up to the mine hill that morning. Tommy, with Sally Elliott assisting, is there, partly out of college educational research interests. Sally uses her family connections to join the Brunist camp for interviews. As she finishes interviewing the aged Harriet McCardle from Florida, the woman dies in her chair, and Sally flees. The Brunists arrange with the town's governance for an ambulance to quietly remove McCardle. Goaded by Cavanaugh's suspicions, a confrontation builds between townspeople and law enforcement, when the Warrior Apostles suddenly return, scare everyone, and hurl a dog's head and two decapitated doves at the crowd. The confrontation is over, the Brunist camp is found to have been trashed.

The next day, some of the Brunists leave, others who gave up everything stay on, despite not having any place to stay.

=== Book II ===
Later that week, Cavanaugh learns that much of the Brunist funding comes from Debra Edwards stealing from her husband and his own wife using her separate bank account, apparently set up for tax evasion. He fires Bernice Filbert, her Brunist nurse, and arranges for Catholic nursing only. He arranges for the Chamber of Commerce executive director Jim Elliott to be fired. Mayor Maury Castle is resigning, under threat from unidentified Italians. Charlie Bonali joins the police force.

The abandoned mine offices are found to have been broken into. It is hard to identify what might have been stolen, if anything, but the possibility that there had been some dynamite cannot be ruled out.

Carl Dean "Ugly" Palmers, now calling himself Pach' (short for Apache), one of the original Brunists who served three years in prison after his assault on Miller, arrives in town. He has been fed up with religion since prison, tailing the Collins family from a distance, eager and frightened to see Elaine Collins again. The camp is celebrating the news that Suggs has successfully negotiated the purchase of the Mount of Redemption on their behalf.

Darren is now predicting seven weeks of waiting, leading to a new date June 7 for the Rapture. Sally hits it off with Billy Don, to Darren's disapproval. They go hunting through cemeteries for the unknown graves of Giovanni and Marcella Bruno, and find what is certainly Giovanni's. To Darren's shock, the tombstone gives his date of death says June 7.

Wesley (and his inner Jesus) go wandering when Priscilla runs errands. Wesley discovers his bank account has been closed, and flips out. Priscilla finds him at his old manse. She is pregnant.

Saturday night, at the Blue Moon Motel, some of the motorcycle gang are hanging out on their last night in town. When two of them suspect a police set up, they steal Tommy Cavanaugh's station wagon to get their gear out. When they return, they find one of their gang has been beaten to death. The next morning, in a wooden area near the camp, they surprise Abner Junior and Elaine flagellating each other. They beat Abner and rape Elaine. They are interrupted by Pach', Debra, and then the rest of the camp, but make their escape. The Baxters are evicted.

=== Book III ===
Ben, Clara and Elaine take time off, visiting Brunist churches to the east. They return shortly before the June 7 dedication. Elaine is refusing to talk and refusing to eat, and has to be hospitalized and force-fed. Questioning Debra, Ben learns that the bikers were burying something. He looks for the spot, finds it, uncovers a cache of dynamite, and reburies it elsewhere. He will later find a second cache, and takes countermeasures.

Franny Baxter escapes her hellish existence by marrying out.

Tommy finally breaks off his affair with Angela when she tells him she's pregnant. Her brother Charlie beats Tommy severely, landing him in the hospital. Angela is fired from her bank job. Cavanaugh has the bank foreclose the Bonali house.

Wesley's inner Jesus has taken over. Priscilla has great difficulty restraining him.

The night before the dedication, the Baxterites stage a raid on the Brunist camp, cutting telephone wires and electricity. They are beaten back in an exchange of gunfire, with one of their own wounded. Several Baxterites are arrested, but only Abner is kept in jail for a time.

The dedication of the camp proceeds without electricity. It is interrupted by the news that Suggs has had a major stroke.

Dave Osborne's shoe store is going out of business, also facing foreclosure. Osborne distributes notices of a spectacular shoe sale. As a crowd lines up for the noon opening, they witness Osborne hang himself on a noose made of shoelaces.

Cavanaugh has the sheriff finally arrest Debra for embezzlement. The evening service at the Brunist camp that night is interrupted by popping sounds. They investigate, and find an adulterous couple killed, apparently by the woman's husband, who has fled.

Darren, who admires the Baxterites, is getting more self-righteous, spies on the other top Brunists, adopts Colin, and plans to set things right

Lem Filbert's auto shop is torched.

=== Book IV ===
The biker gang, renamed The Wrath of God and with reinforcements, returns the night before the Fourth of July, and lure Sheriff Puller out of the way, using one of the Baxterites as bait, and kill both of them. The deputy sheriff, now acting sheriff, Calvin Smith, is a Baxterite.

Sally finally seduces Tommy. Their night in a motel is ended prematurely when they run into Stacy and Cavanaugh in the motel's hallway.

On July 5, at a ceremony for the dedication of a symbolic grave of Giovanni Bruno, the town leaders show up with Bruno, a shell of his former self, although the Brunists are skeptical. Darren approaches. Bruno says "Dark...Light", Darren reveals Eleanor Norton's gold medallion which he had stolen from Clara. Bruno crosses himself and falls to his knees and has a fit. A scuffle ensues, interrupted by explosions at the camp, which turn out to be booby traps set by Ben. Five bikers are killed, along with Ben. The bikers vow vengeance on all of West Condon.

The Brunists plan on July 7 being the day of Redemption. Clara leaves the camp with her daughter Elaine, who being pregnant, has begun eating again. Early that morning Billy Don calls Sally and arranges to escape the madness with her. He is killed by Darren, who gives unsuspecting Abner Junior the gun. The National Guard, the state Governor with state police, and numerous journalists show up. The bikers engage in a reign of terror, blowing up buildings and cars all across West Condon. At the hospital, a nurse is forced at gunpoint to identify which room Suggs is in, and a biker proceeds to the room and shoots the helpless man. After the bank is blown open, the mayor shows up, and without anyone noticing, walks off with a million dollars and flees, using Lucci as his fall guy. At the mine, as the Baxterites are confronting the Brunists with armed private militia and surrounded by state and federal troops, Jesus walks up to the Mount accompanied by Jenkins and Priscilla. He delivers new, generally confusing, beatitudes, but Abner Baxter accepts them as genuine. The multiple confrontations end with most of the bikers dead, most of the Baxterites arrested, and the Brunists scattered. Jesus abandons Wesley, who is institutionalized.

In fact Suggs is not dead—the nurse had named a room where a man had just died—and Bernice takes Suggs home for safety. She negotiates a fantastic home care deal for herself (including a generous close-out payment upon death) with a lawyer who is taking over Suggs's assets. But when Sally learns Suggs is being mistreated, Bernice murders Suggs with a lethal injection.

=== Epilogue ===
Sally becomes a professional writer, and her first book is The Killing of Billy D, a bestselling non-fiction novel about the murder of Billy Don. Abner Junior is eventually cleared while on death row, but not his father. The novel ends with his execution.

== Reception ==
=== Previews ===
I haven't been this excited to read new Coover...well, since I started reading Coover.

— Garth Risk Hallberg, The Millions

The new book is set five years after the events of the first, with Mr. Coover's creepy fundamentalists awaiting the end of the world.

— Michael H. Miller, The New York Observer

=== Reviews ===
The writing itself is the main attraction of Coover's beastly new novel–vivid, specific, evocative, and fiercely intelligent.

— ?, Publishers Weekly

The Brunist Day of Wrath is the best, most impressive novel I've read in years.

— Howard Schneider, The Wall Street Journal

The Coover of the 21st century writes with considerably more flair than his 1960s counterpart.

— Stephen J. Burn, The New York Times Book Review

The Brunist Day of Wrath is a boisterous, bloody, jaw-dropping, awe-inspiring—for any writer, humbling—sometimes painfully, but always expertly, protracted ride.

— Natalie Helberg, Numéro Cinq

One thing that is immediately apparent in The Brunist Day of Wrath is its seemingly effortless polish.

— Robert Moor, Harper's
