= Huck Out West =

Book by Robert Coover

- Author: Robert Coover
- Language: English
- Genre: Novel
- Publisher: W. W. Norton & Company
- Publication date: 2017
- Publication place: United States
- ISBN: 978-0-393-60844-1

Huck Out West is a 2017 novel by American author Robert Coover. The novel concerns the lives of Tom Sawyer and Huckleberry Finn during and after the American Civil War. The novel is one of several to imagine Huck's life after The Adventures of Huckleberry Finn.
