= Pricksongs & Descants =

- First edition
- Author: Robert Coover
- Language: English
- Genre: Short story collection
- Publisher: E. P. Dutton
- Publication date: 1969
- Publication place: United States
- Media type: Print (hardback)
- Pages: 227
- OCLC: 438734283

Pricksongs & Descants is a collection of short fiction by Robert Coover first published in 1969 by E. P. Dutton.

The volume includes "The Babysitter", Coover's most anthologized work of fiction.

The title refers to Medieval musical forms that are used here as a double entendre.

== Stories ==
- "The Door"
- "The Magic Poker"
- "Morris in Chains"
- "The Gingerbread House"
- "Seven Exemplary Fictions"
  - "Prologue"
  - "Panel Game"
  - "The Marker"
  - "The Brother"
  - "In a Train Station"
  - "Klee Dead"
  - "J's Marriage"
  - "The Wayfarer"
- "The Elevator"
- "Romance of the Thin Man and the Fat Lady"
- "Quenby and Ola, Swede and Carl"
- "The Sentient Lenses"
  - "Scene for Winter"
  - "The Mildmaid of Salmaniego"
  - "The Leper's Helix"
- "A Pedestrian Accident"
- "The Babysitter"
- "The Hat Act"

== Background ==
Essayist and critic Thomas E. Kennedy describes two divergent literary trends that arose among American fiction writers of the 1960s. One is "objective fiction" that blends journalistic methods applied to fictional forms. Truman Capote's In Cold Blood (1966) exemplifies this approach, as does Norman Mailer's Armies of the Night (1968). In this latter form, the author may identify him or herself explicitly as the narrator. Tom Wolfe's "real-life" fiction, such as Bonfire of the Vanities (1988) and Hunter S. Thomson's Fear and Loathing in Las Vegas (1971) represent subjective reportage that conflate "fiction and reality."

In contrast to "representational" fiction a "New Fiction" emerged among writers who abandoned "conventional realism" for "blatant illusions." Traditional introduction-climax-resolution" plots were replaced with innovative non-linear structures. Notable early practitioners of this postmodernist approach are John Barth's Lost in the Funhouse (1968), Donald Barthelme's (Unspeakable Practices, Unnatural Acts (1968) and Robert Coover's Pricksongs & Descants.

Critic Thomas Alden Bass, from a 1982 interview with Coover, reports: "Friends lent him a cabin up at Rainy Lake in Canada 'where I wrote the stories about origins,' Coover says, referring to the pieces that later appeared in Pricksongs & Descants."

== Reception ==
"The title [Pricksongs & Descants] is a metaphor for a method that Coover has elaborated throughout his career. In manuscripts of medieval European music, the notes were physically "pricked" or marked with holes or dots. The melody (the cantus firmus could be ornamented or counterpointed with an extemporised part, known as the descant. It's common enough for musical terms to be used to describe narrative (theme, leitmotif and so on) but Coover's usage is more precise."—Literary critic Kunzru, Hari in The Guardian, June 27, 2011.

New York Times literary critic William H. Gass describes the stories as "virtuoso exercises: alert, self-conscious, instructional and show-off" and ranking Coover among the finest innovative post-war writers who "wish to instruct us in the art of narration, the myth-making imagination." Gass regards "The Babysitter" as "one of the most impressive pieces in the book."

Novelist and critic Joyce Carol Oates in The Southern Review informs readers that Coover's Pricksongs & Descants is simultaneously "crude and intellectual, predictable and alarming [and] not interested at all in creating old-fashioned worlds for us to believe in...he gives the impression of thoroughly enjoying his craft."

== Retrospective appraisal ==
Reviewer Hari Kunzru at The Guardian declares the Pricksongs & Descants "cemented Coover's reputation, standing today as one of the landmarks of postwar American fiction."

Thomas E. Kennedy writes: "Pricksongs & Descants is a work of pure genius... a book that on its own ought to guarantee a permanent place for Coover in American letters."

Coover at his best is a great innovative writer of short fiction, a brilliant metafiction strategist, a writer with the grasp to perceive and courage to follow a vision of astounding originality.

== Sources ==
- Bass, Thomas Alden. 1982. "An Encounter with Robert Coover." The Antioch Review, Summer, 1982, Vol. 40, No. 3, pp. 287–302 Antioch Review https://www.jstor.org/stable/4611123 Accessed 10 December 2025.
- James, Cayrn. 1983. "In Bed One Night & Other Brief Encounters." VLS, no. 22 (December 1983). in Robert Coover: A Study of the Short Fiction. 1992. pp 139–140 Twayne publishing, New York. Gordon Weaver, General Editor ISBN 0-8057-8347-4
- Coover, Robert. 1969. Pricksongs & Descants. E. P. Dutton, New York. ASIN: B0006C02ZA
- Garner, Dwight. 2018. "Experiments Succeed—and Fail—Spectacularly in Robert Coover's Lab. Review of 'Going for a Beer.'" New York Times, February 12, 2018. https://www.nytimes.com/2018/02/12/books/review-going-for-beer-robert-coover.html Accessed November 1, 2025.
- Gass, William H.. 1969. "Look at Me, Look at Me, Look at Me Now, Says This Sparkling, Teasing Prose." New York Times, October 19, 1969. https://www.nytimes.com/1969/10/19/archives/pricksongs-descants-by-robert-coover-227-pp-new-york-e-p-dutton-co.html Accessed 5 December 2025.
- Gass, William H. 1972. Fiction and Figures of Life. Vintage Press, New York. pp. 104–109 in Robert Coover: A Study of the Short Fiction. pp. 128–131. Twayne publishers, New York. Gordon Weaver, General Editor ISBN 0-8057-8347-4
- Kennedy, Thomas E.. 1992. Robert Coover: A Study of the Short Fiction. Twayne publishing, New York. Gordon Weaver, General Editor ISBN 0-8057-8347-4
- Kunzru, Hari. 2011. "Robert Coover: a life in writing." The Guardian, June 27, 2011.https://www.theguardian.com/culture/2011/jun/27/robert-coover-life-in-writing Accessed November 1, 2025.
- Oates, Joyce Carol. 1971. "Realism and Distance, Realism of Immediacy." Southern Review 8, no. 1 (Winter 1971) in "Robert Coover: A Study of the Short Fiction." 1992. p 131-132. Twayne publishing, New York. Gordon Weaver, General Editor ISBN 0-8057-8347-4
