= Sara Caldwell =

American screenwriter

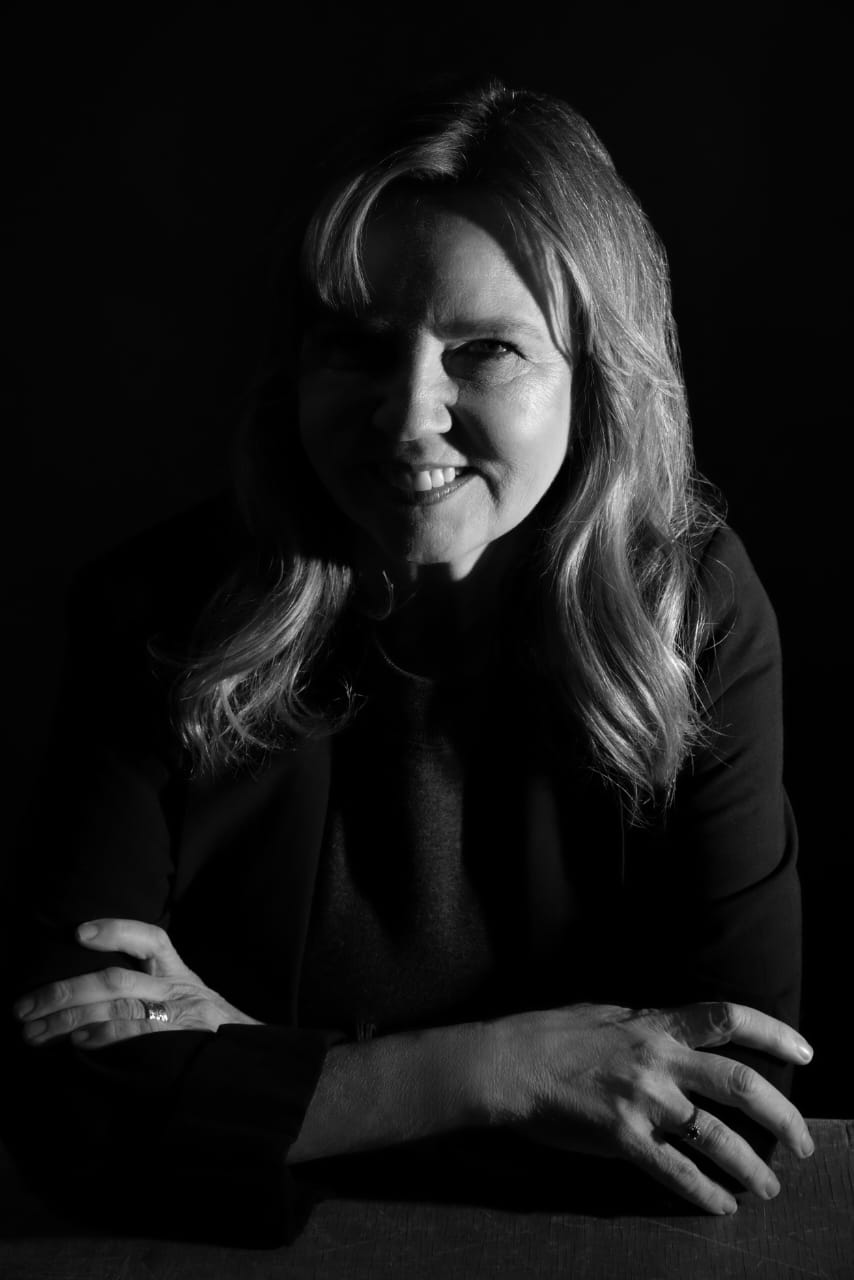
- Born: New York City
- Education: University of Iowa; California State University, Northridge
- Occupations: Filmmaker; screenwriter; author
- Years active: 1989–present

Sara Caldwell (born Sara Chapin Coover; 1961 in New York City) is an American author and screenwriter/filmmaker. She was founder and producer/writer of Amphion Productions from 1991 to 2006. Currently she is a co-producer and writer for House of Gorey Productions.

== Early life and education ==
The daughter of writer Robert Coover, and Spanish tapestry artist Pilar Sans Coover, Caldwell lived in many different locations when growing up, both small towns and large cities in Guatemala, Spain, England, and various parts of the United States. She attended the progressive boarding school, Dartington Hall School, in Totnes, England. Returning to America at the age of 17, she pursued a bachelor's degree in Communications from the University of Iowa, where she was a member of the undergraduate Iowa Writers Workshop.She completed her MFA in Screenwriting at California State University, Northridge.

== Career ==
After graduation, Caldwell moved to Chicago, Illinois to work as a producer/writer.

Whilst in Chicago, she became involved with an inner city tutoring program, resulting in the production of her first documentary, 'Cabrini Green... what you don't see' which aired on the Chicago PBS station.

Caldwell moved to Washington, D.C. in 1989 to work for WORLDNET Television and Film Service, a division of United States Information Agency. Here, she was a writer/producer for live interactive broadcasts to Africa, East Asia, and the Middle East. She then worked at Motion Masters in Charleston, West Virginia for six months before returning to Chicago in 1991 to form Amphion Productions. She then worked as a freelance writer/producer on hundreds of projects and was a 1997 competition winner for the Chicago/Illinois Screenplay Contest. She moved her company to Los Angeles in 1998 and has since written three books on screenwriting/film production topics. She is also a professor of film/screenwriting courses at College of the Canyons in Santa Clarita, California and the Fashion Institute of Design and Merchandizing (FIDM) in Los Angeles.

In 2018, she penned her first young adult novel, Raven Dock, to be published by White Bird Publications. The novel is part of a series known as Dark Coven. She also co-wrote/produced/directed the YouTube comedy web series, BOOMERS.

Caldwell is currently a lecturer in the Film and Media Studies department at the University of California, Santa Barbara (UCSB) and a digital media instructor at College of the Canyons (COC) in Santa Clarita.

She co-founded House of Gorey Productions with her husband, Walter Gorey, in 2010, through which she has directed and produced short films and animations.

== Personal life ==
Caldwell lives in Valencia, California.

== Awards and nominations ==
=== Screenplay awards ===
- 2017 Burbank International Film Festival – Winner, Best Original Screenplay – The International Horror Hotel.
- 2018 – Finalist, Best Screenplay NOLA Horror Film Festival – Raven Dock
- 2015 – Nominee, Best Horror LAIFF August Award – Scissor Man (shared with Katherine Bulovic & Walter Gorey)
- 2015- IndieFEST Film Awards Winner, Award of Merit (Short Film) – Boarding House (shared with Katherine Bulovic & Walter Gorey)
- 2015- International Haunted Horror Film Festival – Winner, Audience Choice Horror Short Film – Scissor Man (shared with Katherine Bulovic)
- 2019- Los Angeles Film Awards (LAFA) Winner, Best Drama Screenplay – Shelter Me (shared with Jerry A. Vasilatos)
- 2019 –Los Angeles Film Awards (LAFA) Nominee, Feature Screenplay – Shelter Me (shared with Jerry A. Vasilatos)
- 2020 – Nominee, Festival Award – Boomers Web Series Festival Global (shared with Nancy Hendrickson)
- 2020 – Winner, Honorable Mention (June) – Boomers One-Reeler Short Film Competition, (shared with Nancy Hendrickson).
- 2020 – Nominee, Certificate of Achievement Independent Shorts Awards (Best Sci-Fi) – Glitch (shared with Walter Gorey).
- 2021 – Winner, Best Thriller Short Independent Shorts Awards (Honorable Mention) – Blocked
- 2021 – Winner, Best Mobile Short Independent Shorts Awards (Honorable Mention) – Blocked
- 2020 – Nominee, Best Sci-Fi Short IndieX Film Festival, (Semi-Finalist) – Glitch ( shared with Walter Gorey)
- 2023 – Winner, Honorable Mention Global Shorts, Los Angeles(March) – The Ghost Under My Bed

== Selected works ==
=== Books ===
- Splatter Flicks: How to Make Low-Budget Horror Films (Los Angeles: Encyclopocalypse Publications, 2025)
- Raven Dock: Dark Coven Series (Austin, TX: White Bird Publications, 2018)
- Jump-start your Awesome Film Company (New York: Allworth Press, 2005)
- (with Maria-Eve Kielson) So You Want To Be A Screenwriter (New York: Allworth Press, 2000)
