= Abner Graboff =

American artist, illustrator

- Born: June 28, 1919; East Orange, New Jersey
- Died: 1986; U.S.
- Education: Parsons School of Design, New York City
- Known for: illustration, drawing, painting
- Movement: contemporary
- Spouse: Vivian Linde
- Awards: 1954 "The New York Times Best Illustrated Children's Book"

Abner Graboff (June 28, 1919 – 1986) was an American artist and illustrator of Russian origin.

== Biography ==
=== Early life and beginnings ===
Abner Graboff's Russian immigrant parents, Joseph and Sonia, owned and ran a laundry business in East Orange, New Jersey. Abner was born on June 28, 1919. He had a brother, Ira, six years younger. His father Joseph died of cancer at the age of 48. After finishing high school Abner Graboff got a scholarship to Parsons School of Design in New York City, and then transferred to another college. During the WWII he enlisted the army signal corps and spent some time in Europe in the UK and France. When the war ended, Abner Graboff met and married Vivian Linde, a classical violinist also from East Orange. They raised three children - Michael was born in 1951 and twins Paul and Jonathan (Jon) in 1954. Jon Graboff became a musician, playing pedal steel guitar with Ryan Adams and the Cardinals, Willie Nelson, Carrie Underwood, and Joan Osborn, among others.

=== Career ===
Abner Graboff started his career as a freelance graphic designer. He was active from the 1950s and was a prolific artist and beginning from 1954 children's book illustrator.

In 1949 Graboff took part in the 28th Annual Exhibition of Advertising and Editorial Art of the New York Art Directors Club held at Museum of Modern Art (March 15–April 17, 1949). In the early days of television he did a lot of work on clear celluloid for CBS. Graboff started designing the artwork for record albums published by firms such as MGM Records, Columbia Records, and RCA Victor. He illustrated cookbooks and music books.

In 1954 Abner Graboff illustrated his first book for children, The Sun Looks Down, which was awarded "The New York Times Best Illustrated Children's Book" by The New York Times. There were many more children's books to come, into the 1970s.

Graboff worked consistently almost until his death in 1986, illustrating in his distinctive style.

In 2020 two of Graboff's children's books (There Was an Old Lady and What Can Cats Do?) were translated into Polish by Emilia Kiereś, a Polish writer and the daughter of Małgorzata Musierowicz, the author of popular books for teenagers.

== Works ==
=== Books ===
- The Sun Looks Down (1954)
- Rainbow In The Morning (1956)
- A Tale Is A Tale (1957)
- Abelard Folk Song Book (1958)
- I Want To Whistle (1958)
- The Daddy Days (1958)
- Of Course, You’re A Horse! (1959)
- Merry Ditties (song book for piano and guitar) (1959)
- Something For You, Something For Me (1960)
- Noise In The Night (1960)
- Mr Angelo (1960)
- Please Don’t Feed Horace (1961)
- I Know An Old Lady (1961)
- Weeks And Weeks (1962)
- A Fresh Look At Cats (1963)
- The Hungry Goat (1964)
- No Sort Of Animal (1964)
- Heat (1965)
- Mrs. McGarrity’s Peppermint Sweater (1966)
- Do You Want To See Something? (1965)
- Do Cat Birds Have Whiskers? (1967)
- Willie & Winnie & Wilma The Wicked Witch (1967)
- Skippy The Skunk (1968)
- Would You Put Your Money In A Sand Bank? (1968)
- Crystal Magic (1968)
- Limpy The Lion, (See and Say Sounds Series) (1969)
- Old Macdonald Had A Farm (1969)
- It’s A Picnic! (1969)
- Ann’s Ann-imal (1969)
- Do You What I See? No! I See Something Else (1975)
- In A Cat’s Eye (1976)

=== Album covers ===
- Portia Nelson, Jack Cassidy In Rodgers & Hart's On Your Toes, Columbia Masterworks (1952)
- Martyn Green, Lehman Engel, Columbia Operetta Chorus And Orchestra Martyn Green's Gilbert & Sullivan, Columbia Masterworks ML 4643 (1953)
- Danny Kaye, Columbia CL6023 * Somethin' Smith & The Redheads Ain't We Got Fun Kinda Songs MGM Records E3941
- The Boston Pops Orchestra Classic Marches, RCA Victor Red Seal ERA-27
- Alan Mills Old MacDonald Had A Farm And Other Funny Songs, Scholastic Records CC0628 (1969)
- Alan Mills I Know An Old Lady And Other Funny Songs, Scholastic Records (1969)
- Various Artists American Songs To Sing, Scholastic Records SCC2745 (1976)
- Sylvia Grant And Deborah Howe Hi! Ho! What's The Weather, Scholastic Records SCC2797 (1976)
- Richard Maltby and His Orchestra Musical Highlights "Damn Yankees" "X" EXA-136
- Haydn Trumpet Concerto - Sinfonia Concertante - Divertimento, Concert Hall CM2101
- The Stuttgart Festival Band, Emil Kahn – John Philip Sousa Marches And Others Alto Saxophone, Music Minus One MMO 7069
- Sir John Barbirolli Viennese Night With Barbirolli, Vanguard Everyman Classics SRV237SD
- Various Artists Zum Tanzen Und Träumen - Unvergängliche Schlager, Varieton POP-1207
