= The Babysitter (short story) =

- Short story by Robert Coover
- Country: United States
- Language: English

Publication
- Published in: Pricksongs & Descants
- Publisher: E. P. Dutton
- Media type: Print (hardback)
- Publication date: 1969

"The Babysitter" is a short story by Robert Coover first published in Coover's 1969 collection Pricksongs & Descants by E. P. Dutton.

The story is Coover's most anthologized work of fiction.

== Plot ==
"The Babysitter" is told by a third-person unreliable narrator and consists of 107 unnumbered vignettes.

A teenage babysitter arrives at Dolly and Harry Tucker's house to care for their three young children, Jimmy, Bitsy and an infant. The Tuckers depart to attend a party. Jack, the babysitter's boyfriend, arrives with Mark (Mark is the son of the couple throwing the party) and they play pinball. Mark suggests they take advantage of the babysitter; Jack is uneasy, but consents, with the rationalization he can rescue his girlfriend if things get out of hand. The babysitter simply wishes to bathe the children and put them to bed and watch TV. Harry Tucker, intoxicated, schemes to return to his house on a pretext and seduce the babysitter.

The story becomes a phantasmagoria of images involving cross-dressing and voyeurism when the babysitter takes bath. Mr. Tucker arrives home to find Jack in the tub with the girl, and ejects him from the house. Or perhaps Mark and Jack drown her in the tub. Or perhaps Dolly Tucker arrives and finds all four adults in the tub. Or the infant is drowned in the bathwater. Or a strange intruder enters the house and assaults the babysitter. Everything happens, or nothing happens in these 107 variations on real or imagined events.

The story presents two endings; one in which the suburban normality is preserved, and another in which the household becomes a crime scene of mayhem and homicide.

== Structure and theme ==
Literary critic Thomas E. Kennedy cautions readers that "The Babysitter" - and other stories in Pricksongs and Descants - does not offer the "dramatic structure" and realistic coherence expected from the short fiction of Hemingway, Faulkner or Fitzgerald. Rather, "The Babysitter" operates on several levels suggesting "a multitude of reality's possibilities." Kennedy likens the narrative to continuously flipping the channels on a TV set.

Kunzru Hari at The Guardian remarks on Coover's "fantastical funhouse of narrative possibilities:"

The cantus firmus is conventional. The babysitter arrives to look after two children. The parents go out. She spends the evening in their house. The parents come home. Coover's innovation is to produce descant-like variations on the possibilities of this scenario, possibilities that open up a grand guignol underworld of sex and violence beneath this suburban surface.

== Sources ==
- Coover, Robert. 1971. Pricksongs & Descants. E. P. Dutton, New York. OCLC 438734283
- Garner, Dwight. 2018. Experiments Succeed — and Fail — Spectacularly in Robert Coover's Lab. Review of "Going for a Beer." New York Times, February 12, 2018. https://www.nytimes.com/2018/02/12/books/review-going-for-beer-robert-coover.html Accessed November 1, 2025.
- Kennedy, Thomas E.. 1992. Robert Coover: A Study of the Short Fiction. Twaynes publishers, New York. Gordon Weaver, General Editor ISBN 0-8057-8347-4
- Kunzru, Hari. 2011. Robert Coover: a life writing. The Guardian, June 27, 2011.https://www.theguardian.com/culture/2011/jun/27/robert-coover-life-in-writing Accessed November 1, 2025.
- Temple, Emily. 2019. "On the Destabilizing Brilliance of Robert Coover's 'The Babysitter' Or, How to Accept the Pain of Not Knowing" Literary Hub, February 4, 2019. https://lithub.com/on-the-destabilizing-brilliance-of-robert-coovers-the-babysitter/ Accessed 05 December, 2025.
