= Pilar Sans Coover =

Spanish American textile artist

- Born: September 16, 1936 (age 89); Tarragona, Spain
- Other name: María del Pilar Sans Mallafré
- Occupation: textile artist
- Spouse: Robert Coover
- Website: www.pilarcoover.com

Pilar Sans Coover (September 16, 1936) is a Spanish American needlework and textile artist.

== Early life and education ==
Coover was born María del Pilar Sans Mallafré in Tarragona, Spain. She received a degree in biology at the University of Barcelona.

== Career ==
Coover started doing needlepoint while she was living in London in the 1970s. Her work has been described as have a "dense, swirling image-packed style." She has made over 100 needlepointed works. She first exhibited her work at the Portal Gallery in London in 1979. She says her goal with her work is to "transcend the limitations of traditional needlework by opening every possibility between the thread and the canvas." She cites Hieronymus Bosch and William Blake as influences. Her work appeared on the cover of Robert Coover's first short story collection, Pricksongs & Descants. Her work "Penelope" won Diana Grossman Award for Best of Show at the Eleventh Biennial Exhibition of the Embroiderers' Guild of America in 1984.

== Personal life ==
Coover was married to Robert Coover in 1959. They met while he was in Spain with the US Navy. They had three children including the author Sara Caldwell.
