= Christopher Coover =

American antiquarian book expert (1950–2022)

Christopher Coover (April 3, 1950 – April 3, 2022) was an American antiquarian book expert. He worked for Christie's in New York City for 35 years. He also was an appraiser on Antiques Roadshow.

He was known for several high-profile sales, including:

- selling Leonardo da Vinci’s Hammer Codex, which formerly belonged to Armand Hammer, to Bill Gates for over $30 million, a record at the time;
- overseeing the sale of Malcolm Forbes’ collection of American historical documents in several sales totalling more than $40.9 million
- Jack Kerouac’s manuscript for his 1957 novel On the Road
- Abraham Lincoln's 1864 election victory speech
- The letter George Washington wrote concerning the ratification of the Constitution; and
- Washington’s personal annotated copy of the 1789 Acts of Congress

He died of pneumonia complicated by Parkinson’s disease.
