= The Public Burning =

1977 novel by Robert Coover

- First edition cover
- Author: Robert Coover
- Language: English
- Publisher: Viking Press
- Publication date: August 26, 1977
- Publication place: United States
- Pages: 534
- ISBN: 0-670-58200-X
- OCLC: 2874068

The Public Burning is a 1977 novel by American writer Robert Coover. It is an account of the events leading to the execution of Julius and Ethel Rosenberg. An uncharacteristically human caricature of Richard Nixon serves as protagonist and narrator for the primary continuity.

The novel satirizes the Cold War politics of Joseph McCarthy by portraying "The Phantom" as the embodiment of global Communism and everything that threatens the American way of life—a vague, terrifying, and omnipresent enemy. The ugly side of the American psyche this draws out is characterized by an incarnation of Uncle Sam who unleashes a torrent of interminable verbosity in a folksy, foul-mouthed style whenever he appears. The New York Times and Time Magazine figure centrally as symbols of institutional failure not only to question whether the truth was a victim in this hyperpoliticized trial but also whether the official narrative was in fact a bunch of political lies.

Coover first experienced difficulty finding a publisher, and then when he found a publisher, getting it to actually publish the novel, due to legal concerns over the unflattering depiction of Richard Nixon, Pat Nixon, Roy Cohn, and others. Then having published the novel, once it became a bestseller, Viking immediately abandoned all support, and withdrew copies without explanation. Coover's editor, Richard Seaver, speculated to Coover that Viking management believed success would attract lawsuits.

Despite these difficulties, this novel has received a large amount of critical attention. It has been called "perhaps the most complete replenishment of the language since Whitman and (in a different way) Mark Twain ... no writer since Melville has dived so deeply and fearlessly into this collective American dream as Coover has in this novel".

== Editions ==
- ISBN 0-670-58200-X (hardcover, 1977)
- ISBN 0-802-13527-7 (paperback, Grove Press, 1998)
