= Robert Coover =

American novelist (1932–2024)

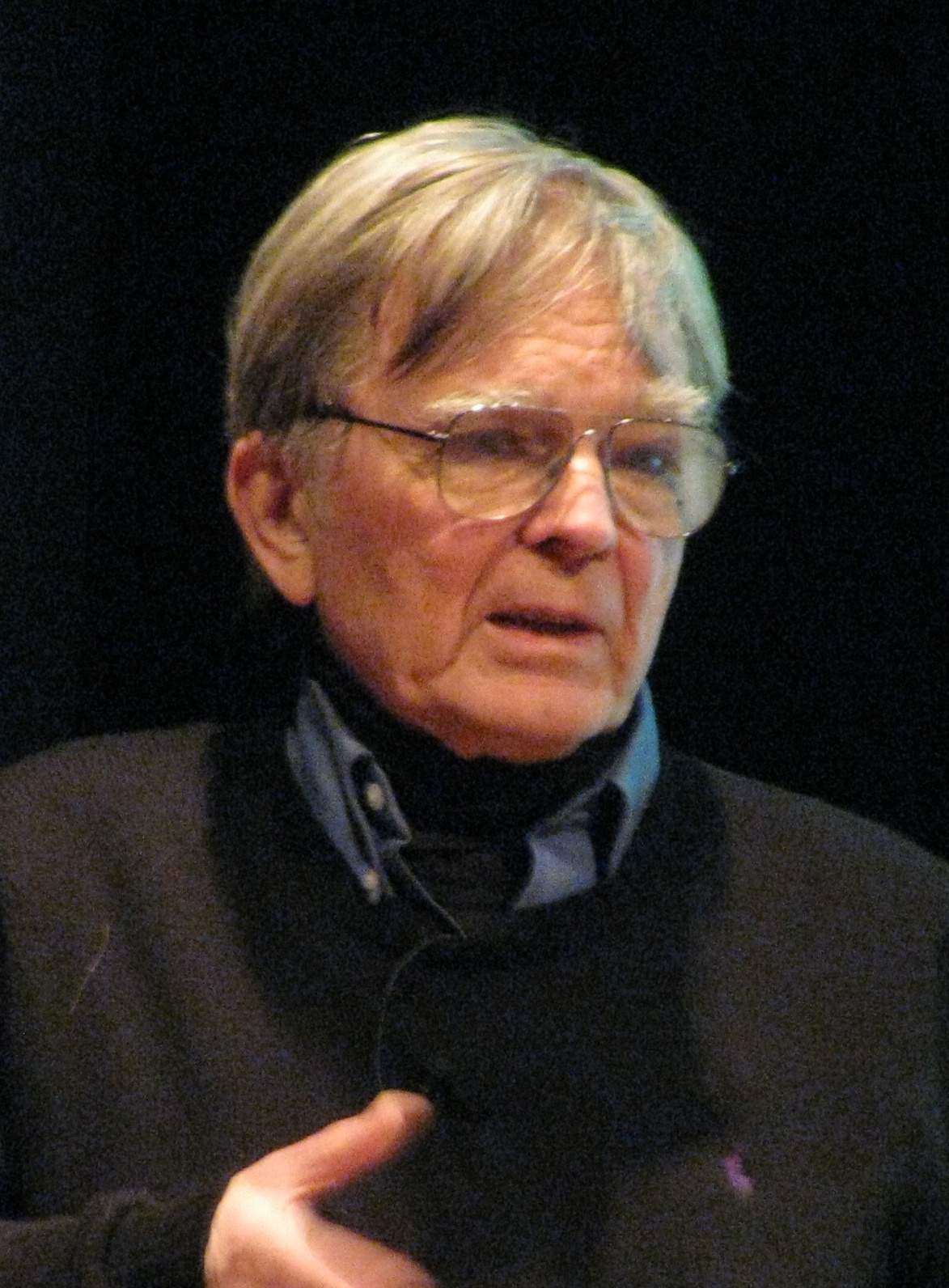
- Coover in 2009
- Born: February 4, 1932; Charles City, Iowa, U.S.
- Died: October 5, 2024 (aged 92); Warwick, England
- Education: Southern Illinois University Carbondale; Indiana University Bloomington (BA); University of Chicago (MA)
- Occupation: Writer
- Spouse: Maria Pilar Sans i Mallafré (m. 1959)
- Children: 3; including Sara
- Writing career
- Period: 1966–2023
- Genres: Short story, novel

Robert Lowell Coover (February 4, 1932 – October 5, 2024) was an American novelist, short story writer, and T. B. Stowell Professor Emeritus in Literary Arts at Brown University. He is generally considered a writer of fabulation and metafiction. He became a proponent of electronic literature and was a founder of the Electronic Literature Organization.

== Background ==
Coover was born in Charles City, Iowa. He attended Southern Illinois University Carbondale, received his B.A. in Slavic Studies from Indiana University Bloomington in 1953, then served in the United States Navy from 1953 to 1957, where he became a lieutenant. He received an M.A. in General Studies in the Humanities from the University of Chicago in 1965. In 1968, he signed the "Writers and Editors War Tax Protest" pledge, vowing to refuse tax payments in protest against the Vietnam War. Coover served as a teacher or writer in residence at many universities. He taught at Brown University from 1981 to 2012.

== Literary career ==
Coover's first novel was The Origin of the Brunists, in which the sole survivor of a mine disaster starts a religious cult. His second book, The Universal Baseball Association, Inc., J. Henry Waugh, Prop., deals with the role of the creator. The eponymous Waugh, a shy, lonely accountant, creates a baseball game in which rolls of the dice determine every play, and dreams up players to attach those results to.

Coover's 1969 short story collection Pricksongs & Descants contains the celebrated metafictional story "The Babysitter," which was adapted into the 1995 movie of the same title, directed by Guy Ferland.

Coover's best-known work, The Public Burning, deals with the case of Julius and Ethel Rosenberg in terms that have been called magic realism. Half of the book is devoted to the mythic hero Uncle Sam of tall tales, dealing with the equally fantastic Phantom, who represents international Communism. The alternate chapters portray the efforts of Richard Nixon to stage the execution of the Rosenbergs as a public event in Times Square. As reviewer Thomas R. Edwards wrote in The New York Times, "Astonishingly, Nixon is the most interesting and sympathetic character in the story."

Coover's 1982 novella Spanking the Maid remained one of his favorites; asked in an interview "Which of your books will get you into heaven?", Coover quipped, "Spanking the Maid. God's deep into S&M." A later novella, Whatever Happened to Gloomy Gus of the Chicago Bears (1987), offers an alternate Nixon, one who is devoted to football and sex with the same doggedness with which he pursued political success in this reality. The theme anthology A Night at the Movies includes the story "You Must Remember This", a piece about Casablanca that features an explicit description of what Rick and Ilsa did when the camera wasn't on them. Pinocchio in Venice returns to mythical themes. In 2014, he published a lengthy sequel to his first novel, The Brunist Day of Wrath.

In 1987 he was the winner of the Rea Award for the Short Story. In 2021, Coover, in a collaboration with Art Spiegelman, released Street Cop.

== Electronic literature ==
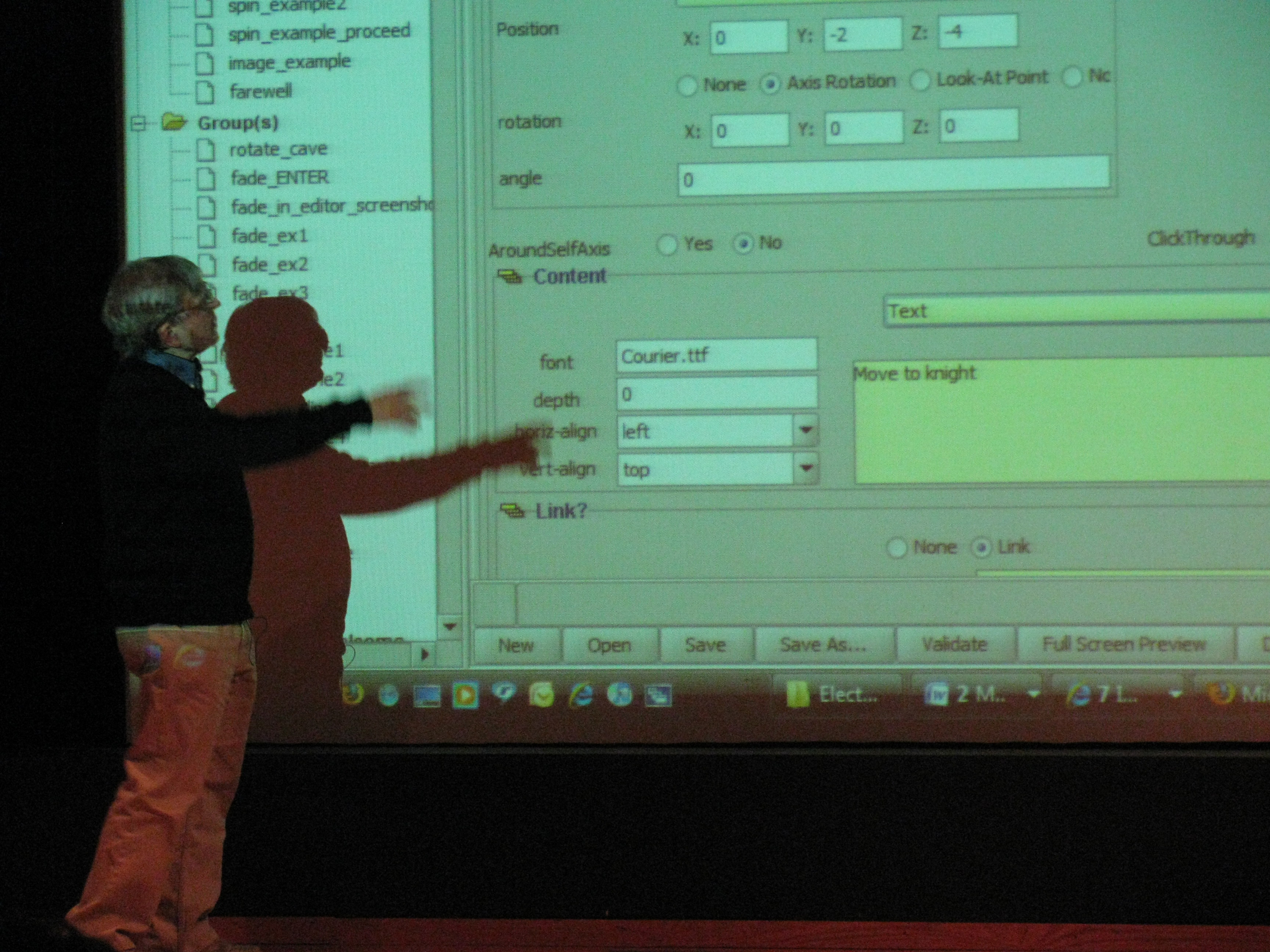
Coover demonstrating the "CaveWriting" software

Coover was a supporter of early electronic literature, and was one of the founders of the Electronic Literature Organization. He taught electronic literature at Brown University and organized events such as the Technology Platforms for 21st Century Literature (TP21CL), held at Brown in 1999. In 1992 he published the essay "The End of Books" in The New York Times, making a mainstream audience aware of the new genre for perhaps the first time. The "now infamous" essay "roiled the literary scene and declaimed the imminent demise of the novel". Many scholars of electronic literature reference the essay, for instance J. Yellowlees Douglas in the title of her book, The End of Books–Or Books Without End? Reading Interactive Narratives. In 1993, Coover published a second New York Times essay on electronic literature titled "Hyperfiction: Novels for the Computer".

Coover established the Master of Fine Arts program in Digital Language Arts at Brown University, and helped bring a string of writers of electronic literature to the university, including John Cayley, Talan Memmott, Noah Wardrip-Fruin, William Gillespie, and Samantha Gorman. Talan Memmott was Brown University's first graduate fellow of electronic writing.

== Personal life and death ==
Coover's wife was the noted needlepoint artist Pilar Sans Coover. They had three children, including Sara Caldwell.

Coover died at a care home in Warwick, England, on October 5, 2024, at the age of 92.

== Bibliography ==
=== Novels ===
- The Origin of the Brunists (1966)
- The Universal Baseball Association, Inc., J. Henry Waugh, Prop. (1968)
- A Political Fable (1968); reprinted as The Cat in the Hat for President: A Fable (2018)
- The Public Burning (1977)
- Spanking the Maid (1982)
- Gerald's Party (1986)
- Whatever Happened to Gloomy Gus of the Chicago Bears? (1987)
- Pinocchio in Venice (1991)
- Dr. Chen's Amazing Adventure (1991)
- John's Wife (1996)
- Briar Rose (1996)
- Ghost Town (1998)
- The Adventures of Lucky Pierre: Director's Cut (2002)
- The Grand Hotels (of Joseph Cornell) (2002)
- Stepmother (2004)
- Noir (2010)
- The Brunist Day of Wrath (2014)
- Huck Out West (2017)
- The Enchanted Prince (2018)
- Street Cop (with Art Spiegelman) (2021)
- Open House (2023)

=== Collections ===
- Pricksongs & Descants (1969)
- In Bed One Night & Other Brief Encounters (1983)
- A Night at the Movies, Or, You Must Remember This: Fictions (1987)
- A Child Again. McSweeney's Books. 2005. ISBN 978-1-932416-22-0. OCLC 62101906.
- Going for a Beer: Selected Short Fictions (2018)

=== Uncollected stories ===
- “Blackdamp.” Noble Savage, no. 4 (October 1961), 218–29.
- “The Square Shooter and the Saint: A Story about Jerusalem.” Evergreen Review, no. 25 (July/August 1962): 92–101.
- “Dinner with the King of England.” Evergreen Review, no. 27 (November/December 1962): 110–18.
- “D.D. Baby.” Cavalier, July 1963, 53–56, 93.
- “Neighbours.” Argosy (UK), January 1966, 129–33.
- “Letter from Patmos.” Quarterly Review of Literature, no. 16, 1969, 29–31.
- “That the Door Opened.” Quarterly Review of Literature, no. 16, 1969, 311–17.
- “The Reunion.” Iowa Review 1.4 (Fall 1970): 64–67.
- "An Encounter". 1972; rpt. Fortnightly Review, 2010.
- “Party Talk: Unheard Conversation at Gerald’s Party." Fiction International 18.2 (Spring 1990): 187–203.
- “A Sudden Story.” TriQuarterly, no. 78, Spring/Summer 1990, 396.
- “Touch.” Paris Review 40.149 (Winter 1998): 155–59.
- “The Photographer.” Fence Magazine 2.2 (Fall/Winter 1999–2000): 30–41.
- “On Mrs. Willie Masters.” Review of Contemporary Fiction 24.3 (Fall 2004): 10–23.
- “Ten Minutes in the Orxatería La Valenciana.” Storie, Afternoon Anthology, no. 42/43, 2008, 227.
- “Red-Hot Ruby.” Conjunctions, no. 50, Spring 2008, 450–69.
- "The Case of the Severed Hand." Harper's Magazine, June 2008.
- "White-Bread Jesus". Harper's Magazine, December 2008.
- "The War Between Sylvania and Freedonia." Harper’s Magazine, July 2010, 62–66.
- "The Old Man".Fortnightly Review, 2011.
- “The Box.” Conjunctions, no. 56, Spring 2011, 221–27.
- "Matinée". New Yorker, July 25, 2011, 67–71.
- "Vampire". Granta, October 21, 2011.
- "The Colonel’s Daughter". New Yorker, September 2, 2013.
- "The Frog Prince". New Yorker, January 27, 2014.
- "The Waitress". New Yorker, May 19, 2014.
- "The Crabapple Tree". New Yorker, January 12, 2015.
- "The Hanging of the Schoolmarm". New Yorker, November 28, 2016.
- "The Wall". Conjunctions, no. 68, Spring 2017.
- "The Boss". New Yorker, August 2, 2017.
- "M*rphed". Granta, October 20, 2017.
- "Treatments". New Yorker, April 30, 2018.
- "Hulk". Granta, June 10, 2019.
- "Citizen Punch". New Yorker, July 18, 2019.

=== Plays ===
- The Kid (1970)
- Love Scene (1971)
- Rip Awake (1972)
- A Theological Position (1972, ISBN 9780525216001)

=== Other ===
- "The Babysitter", 1969 short story
- The Water Pourer (1972) An unpublished chapter from The Origin of the Brunists, signed by author and limited to 300 copies. 22 pages.
- "Charlie in the House of Rue", 1980 short story
- "The End of Books". The New York Times. June 21, 1992. (essay)
- "The Bad Book". On the Bible

== Awards and honors ==
- 1967 William Faulkner Foundation Award for notable first novel for The Origin of the Brunists
- 1987 Rea Award for the Short Story

== See also ==
- List of electronic literature authors, critics, and works
- Digital poetry
- E-book#History
- Electronic literature
- Hypertext fiction
- Interactive fiction
- Literatronica
