= Thomas E. Kennedy =

American novelist

- Born: March 9, 1944; New York City, U.S.
- Died: May 26, 2021 (aged 77); Copenhagen, Denmark
- Education: Bishop Loughlin Memorial High School; City College of New York; Fordham University (BA); Vermont College (MFA); University of Copenhagen (PhD)
- Occupations: Writer; essayist; translator

Thomas E. Kennedy (March 9, 1944 – May 26, 2021) was an American fiction writer, essayist, and translator from Danish. He is the author of more than 30 books, including novels, story and essay collections, literary criticism, translation, and most notably the four novels of the Copenhagen Quartet. Of the quartet, David Applefield, author of Paris Inside Out and The Unofficial Guide to Paris series of books, writes: “Kennedy does for Copenhagen what Joyce did for Dublin.” Kennedy was the co-founder of Serving House Books, a literary press with more than 100 titles in print at the time of his retirement.

== The Copenhagen Quartet ==
After twenty-five years of publishing in small presses and literary magazines, Kennedy was discovered by Bloomsbury Publishing, which offered him a four-book contract, starting in 2010, for his Copenhagen Quartet: four independent novels, with each set in a different season in the Danish capital, and each written in a different literary style.

As an American expatriate who lived in Copenhagen since 1976, Kennedy infused the novels of the quartet with a wealth of historical and cultural details about the city. In particular, Kerrigan in Copenhagen: A Love Story, which is set in spring, is a novel disguised as a guide to Copenhagen's serving houses (a.k.a. pubs). Each chapter takes place in one or more of nearly 60 different pubs. Although each book of the quartet may be read independently, Kerrigan in Copenhagen establishes an in-depth background of the Danish history and culture. The New York Times describes this novel as "a spiraling exploration of alcohol, history, literature, art and jazz."

See also The Washington Post review of In the Company of Angels.

== Early life and education ==
Born in Queens, New York City, Kennedy was the youngest of four children. He graduated from Bishop Loughlin Memorial High School in 1961, volunteered for the draft, and served in the United States Army in 1962–1963. He spent much of the 1960s hitchhiking around the country and later wrote a collection of essays about his experiences, Riding the Dog: A Look Back at America.

He studied for a year and a half at the City College of New York (1961, 1968), and graduated summa cum laude with a Bachelor of Arts degree from Fordham University, Lincoln Center Campus, in 1974. He then relocated to Europe, first working in Ferney-Voltaire, France, as News Editor of World Medical Journal (1974–1976), a publication of the World Medical Association. At the age of 32, he moved to Copenhagen, Denmark, where he lived out his life.

Kennedy worked as head of the international department of the Danish Medical Association, Managing Editor of Danish Medical Bulletin, and from 1976 to 2004 as a translator for the Danish Rehabilitation Center for Torture Victims, now known as the International Rehabilitation Council for Torture Victims (IRC). While in the latter capacity, he traveled extensively worldwide and completed his Master of Fine Arts in Writing degree at Vermont College (1983–1985) and his Ph.D. in American literature at the University of Copenhagen (1985–1988).

His affiliation with the IRC greatly influenced his novel In the Company of Angels, which is among those from his Copenhagen Quartet. The novel won an Eric Hoffer Book Award in 2007 under the title of Greene's Summer.

== Literary career ==
Concurrent with his work as an international executive, Kennedy taught fiction and creative nonfiction in various short-term seminars and low-residency MFA programs in the United States, including Vermont College (1985–1988) and Fairleigh Dickinson University (2004–present).

He served as international editor, advisory editor, and contributing editor to various publications, including Cimarron Review (1990–2000), Pushcart Prize (1990-present), The Literary Review (1996–present), Absinthe: New European Writing (2003–2013), and Serving House: A Journal of Literary Arts (2010–present). He co-edits with Walter Cummins two columns for WebDelSol.Com, as well as serves as co-publisher and co-editor with Cummins of Serving House Books.

More than 300 of Kennedy's stories, essays, and translations from the Danish language have been published in numerous journals, such as The New Yorker online, New Letters, The Independent in London, Esquire Weekly, Glimmer Train, Writer’s Chronicle, and The Literary Review, among numerous others.

== Founding of Serving House Books ==
Serving House Books was founded by Thomas E. Kennedy and Walter Cummins in 2009. Their idea was to publish books that had a hard time finding the right home, in addition to forgotten out-of-print books. Serving House Books, was born as an homage to the main character in Tom's novel, Kerrigan in Copenhagen—to his vibrant excursions to Danish bars, taverns, and other serving houses. When Kennedy retired from an active role with the imprint, he left with more than one hundred SHB titles in circulation, a number of which have been honored as winners or finalists for a variety of awards, including Kirkus independent press books of the year. The press was continued for a number of years by Cummins until his retirement and when William K Lawrence assumed the role.

== Awards and honors ==
Kennedy's work has won several awards, including the O. Henry Prize and two Pushcart Prizes, most recently in 2015.

In 2007, the Association of Writers & Writing Programs dedicated a panel to Kennedy's fiction work.

That same year, he won two Eric Hoffer Awards for novels: Winner in Micro-Press category: Greene’s Summer (re-released as In the Company of Angels in 2010); and First Runner-Up in General Fiction category: Danish Fall (re-released as Falling Sideways in 2011).

In 2008, his essay “I Am Joe’s Prostate” won a National Magazine Award.

In addition, he won multiple grants from the Danish Arts Council for his translations from Danish to American English of many poets and writers (including Dan Turèll, Henrik Nordbrandt, Pia Tafdrup, Kristian Bang Foss, Line-Maria Lång, and Martin Glaz Serup).

In 2016, he was awarded the Dan Turéll Prize by the Turèll Society for his books of the COPENHAGEN QUARTET (2010–2014) and his translations of Danish poets and writers, chiefly Dan Turèll. He was given the silver Turèll medal, on the occasion of what would have been Turèll's 70th birthday.

== Selected bibliography ==
Kennedy has produced an extensive catalog of works during a 50-year career as a writer, editor, and academic. The following bibliography lists only a fraction; a comprehensive list, including publications in journals and magazines, is available in the Spring 2008 issue of The South Carolina Review.

=== Novels ===
- Crossing Borders (1990)
- A Weather of the Eye (1996)
- The Book of Angels (1997)
- Kerrigan's Copenhagen: A Love Story (2002)
- Bluett's Blue Hours (2003)
- Greene's Summer (2004)
- Danish Fall (2005)
- A Passion in the Desert (2007)
- In the Company of Angels (2010)
- Falling Sideways (2011)
- Kerrigan in Copenhagen: A Love Story (2013)
- Beneath the Neon Egg (2014)
- My Life With Women, or The Consolation of Jazz, Vol. 1 (2020)
- My Life With Women, or The Consolation of Jazz, Vol. 2 (2020)

=== Novel-in-essays ===
- Last Night My Bed a Boat of Whiskey Going Down (2010)

=== Short-story collections ===
- Unreal City (1996)
- Drive Dive Dance & Fight (1997)
- Cast Upon the Day (2008)
- Getting Lucky: New & Selected Stories, 1982-2012 (2013)

=== Essay collections ===
- Realism & Other Illusions: Essays on the Craft of Fiction (2002)
- Riding the Dog: A Look Back at America (2008)
- Our Literary Travels, with Walter Cummins (2020)

=== Literary criticism ===
- Andre Dubus A Study of the Short Fiction (1988)
- Robert Coover A Study of the Short Fiction (1992)

=== Translations ===
- Last Walk Through the City: Poems by Dan Turèll (2010)
- Four poems by Henrik Nordbrandt, translated by Thomas E. Kennedy in American Poetry Review, Volume 42, Issue 3 (May/June 2013): 40–41

=== Spoken-word recording ===
- an INTRODUCTION: Dan Turèll+Halfdan E Meets Thomas E. Kennedy, a CD on which Kennedy reads his translations of 12 poems by Turèll, with music by Danish film composer Halfdan E and background vocals by Sanne Graulund. Text and sample audio clip of one of those poems, "Last Walk Through the City," appear online in Serving House Journal.

=== Anthologies ===
- New Danish Fiction, co-edited with Frank Hugus (1995)
- Small Gifts of Knowing: New Irish Poetry and Prose (1997)
- Stories and Sources (1998)
- Poems and Sources (2000)
- The Secret Life of Writers, co-edited with Walter Cummins (2002)
- The Girl with the Red Hair: Musings on a Theme, co-edited with Walter Cummins (2011)
- Celebrating Thomas E. Kennedy (2021)
