= Corcoran School of the Arts and Design =

Art school of George Washington University

Coordinates: 38°53′44.8″N 77°2′24.8″W

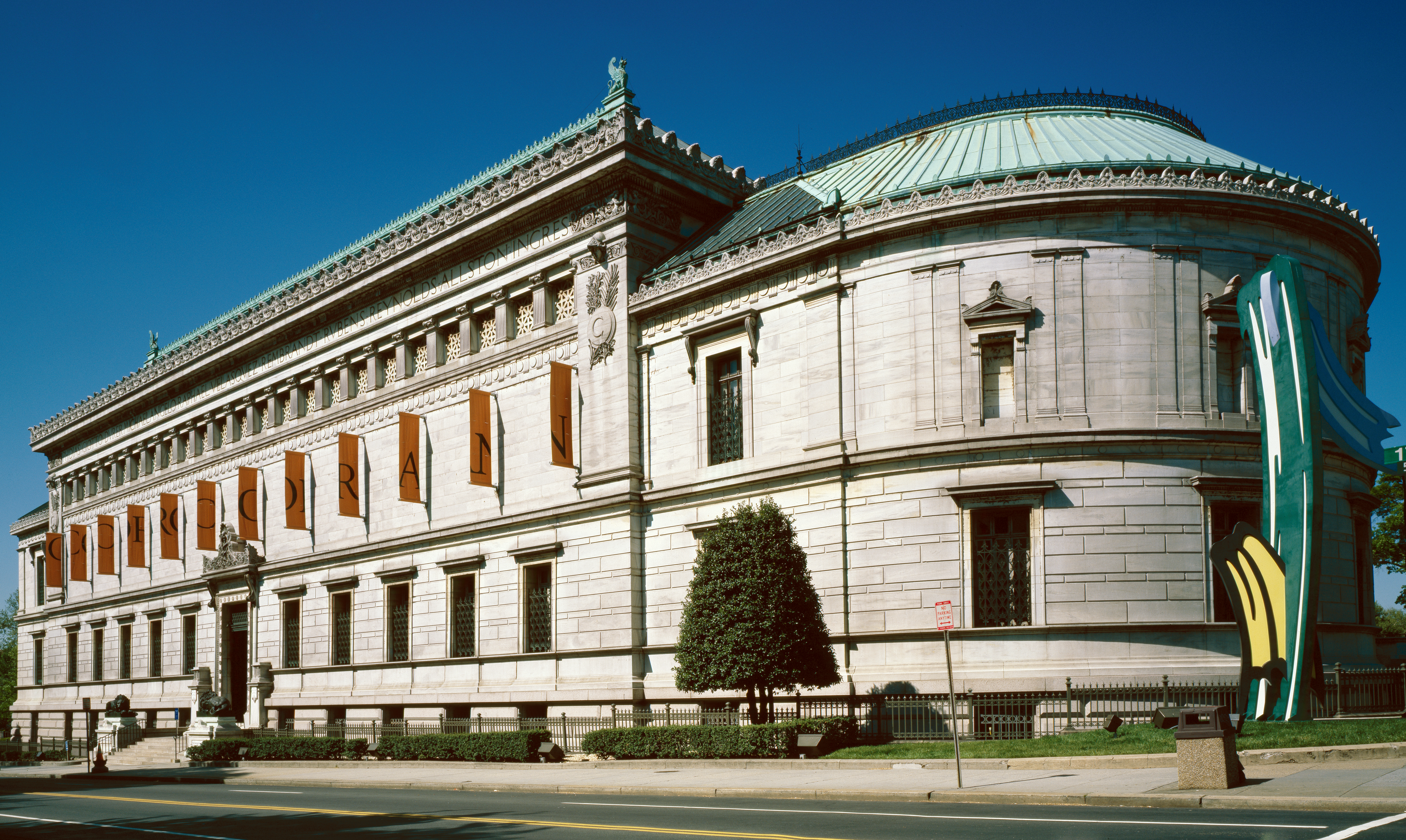
- Corcoran School of the Arts and Design (2019)
- Other names: Corcoran School
- Type: Private
- Established: 1878; 148 years ago
- Parent institution: George Washington University
- Director: Lauren Onkey
- Location: Washington, D.C., U.S.
- Campus: Urban—Foggy Bottom
- Website: corcoran.gwu.edu

The Corcoran School of the Arts and Design (known as the Corcoran School or CSAD) is the professional art school of the George Washington University, in Washington, D.C. Founded in 1878, the school is housed in the Corcoran Gallery of Art, the oldest private cultural institution in Washington, located on The Ellipse, facing the White House. The Corcoran School is part of GW's Columbian College of Arts and Sciences and was formerly an independent college, until 2014.

== History ==
=== 19th century ===
William Wilson Corcoran founded the Corcoran Gallery of Art in 1869. Construction had begun at 17th Street and Pennsylvania Avenue in 1859, but shortly after the exterior work was completed, the Quartermaster General's corps of the Union Army occupied the building, setting up offices for the duration of the Civil War. A Confederate sympathizer, Corcoran himself had relocated to Europe during the Civil War.

Work resumed immediately after the conclusion of the war, with Corcoran formally founding his gallery as an institution in 1869. The first special event held that year was a fundraiser for the completion of the Washington Monument. Corcoran's gallery welcomed its first visitors in 1887, which included art students, who were eager to sketch and paint copies of the collection's famous works.

In 1877, the painter E.F. Andrews (1835–1915) started offering the visiting students and artists formal instruction in two dimensional media for no cost. In 1878, William Wilson Corcoran donated additional funding to be used to establish a school to be associated with the gallery. After Corcoran's 1888 death, a small building was built behind the gallery in 1889 for the purpose of the gallery's burgeoning identity as a place for education in the arts. In 1890 the school officially opened as the Corcoran School of Art.

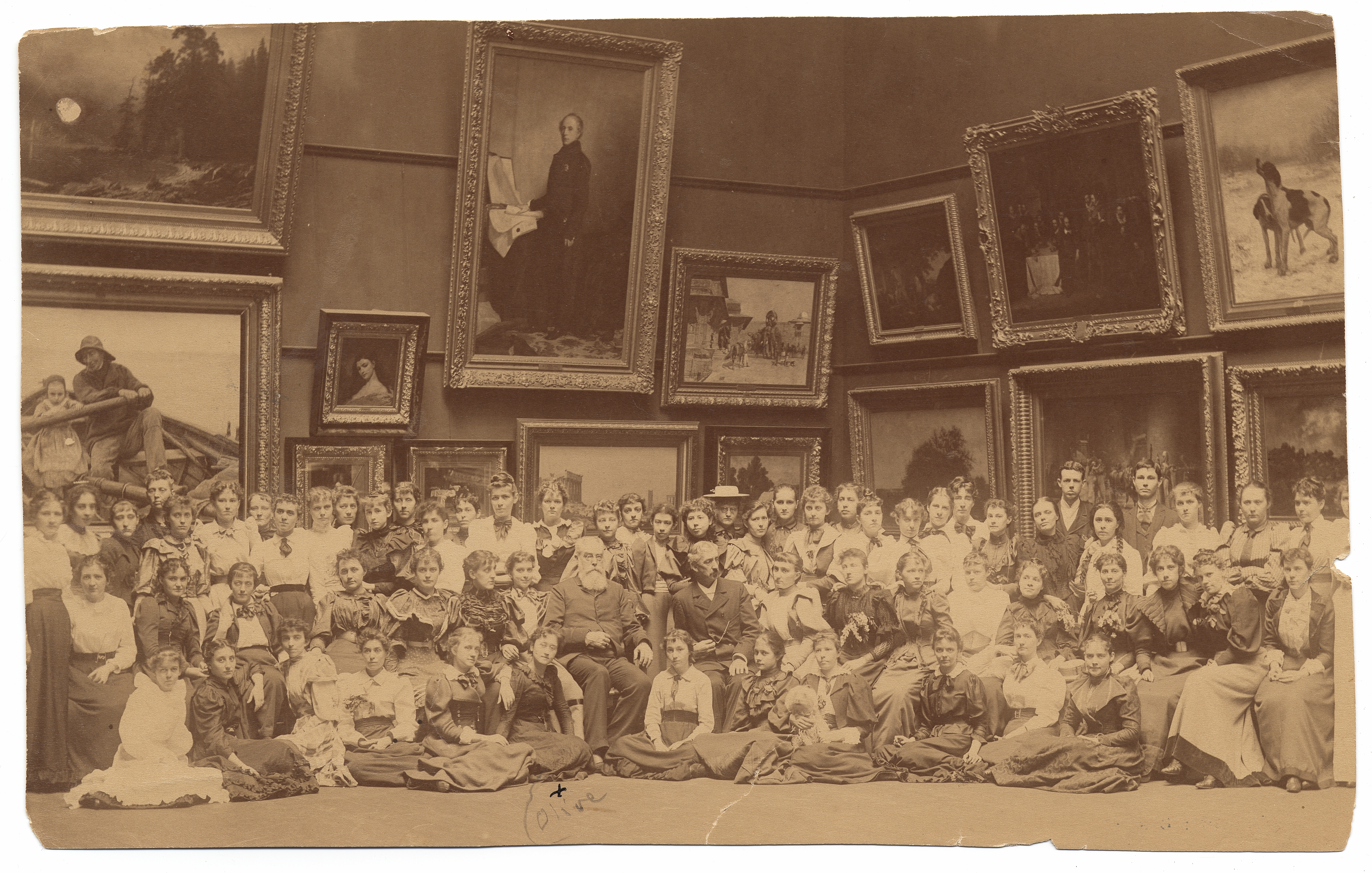
Olive's art class at the Corcoran Art Gallery in Washington D.C.

By the 1890s, both the gallery and the school programs had outgrown their respective spaces. A new, larger building designed by Ernest Flagg was constructed in 1897 at New York Avenue and 17th Street, with the basement level dedicated to workshops and studios for the students, and an upper two floors given over to large gallery spaces. From 1897 to the 1930s, the school continued in a modest existence for art students interested in a museum school. By the 1930s, the school had begun expanding: commercial art classes, scholarships, children's courses, the library, ceramics facilities and courses, weekend classes and summer opportunities were added.

=== 20th century ===
Successful accreditation in the National Association of Schools of Art (NASAD) was achieved in the mid-1970s, with the first BFA degree bestowed in 1978. During this time artists that taught at the school included Gene Davis, Thomas Downing, Sam Gilliam, Anne Truitt, Ed McGowin, William Christenberry, Percy Martin and Paul Reed.

Starting in the 1970s, the College utilized three facilities: the historic Flagg Building housed fine art facilities, the fine art photography and photojournalism facilities. A second building, in Georgetown, housing the Digital Media, Graphic Design, and New Media Photojournalism programs, as well as many fine art offerings in painting and drawing. Additional programs were offered through the Smithsonian's S. Dillon Ripley Center. In 1985, the college was formally accredited by the Middle States Commission on Higher Education.

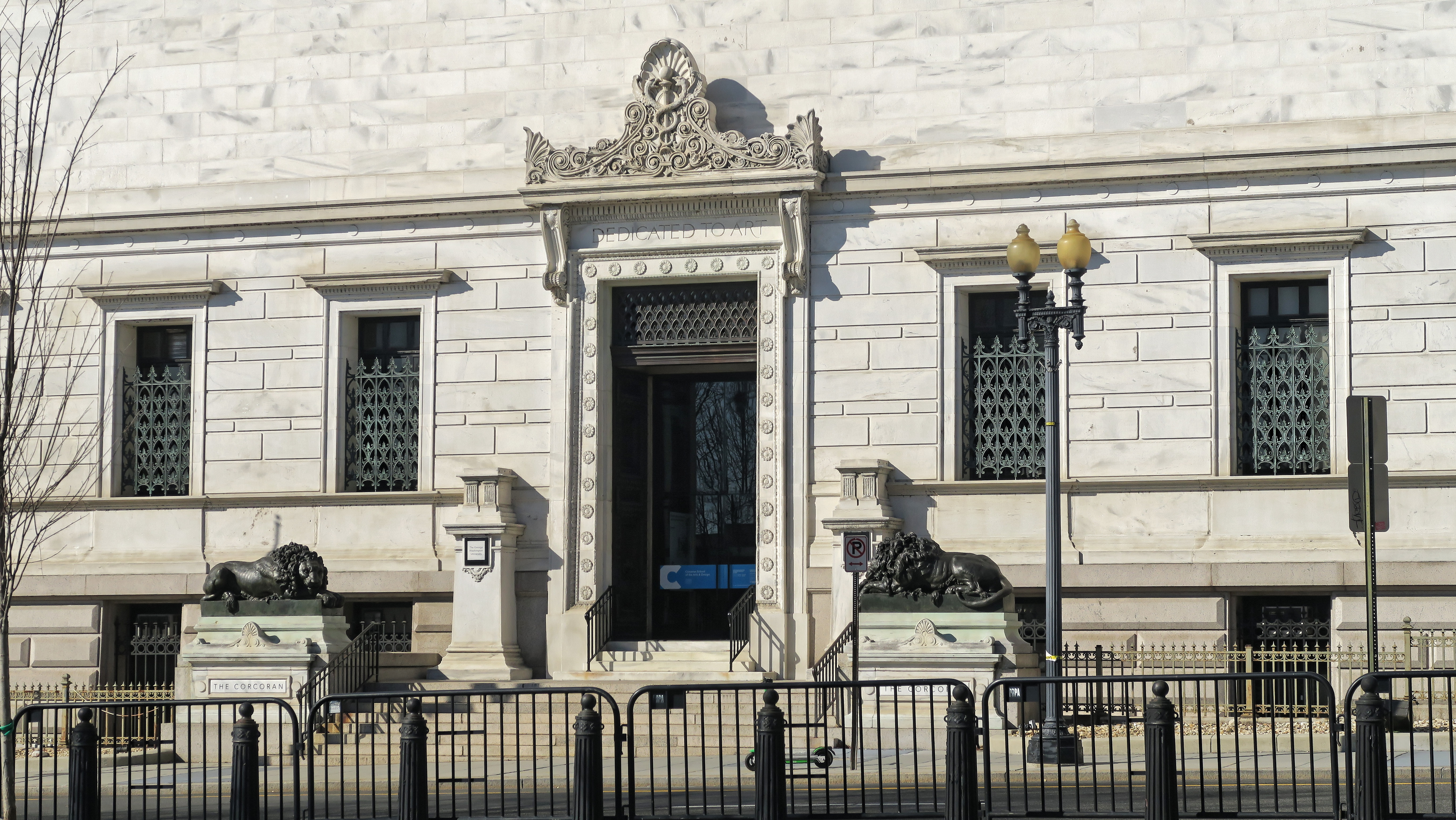
Corcoran School entrance

In 1999, the school was formally renamed as The Corcoran College of Art and Design and worked to further its reputation as the singular four-year arts and design institution in Washington, D.C. As a museum school, students and faculty benefited from co-existing with the Corcoran Gallery with its more than 17,000 works and objects. In the later years of the gallery, a dedicated space known as Studio 31 displayed student art, in addition to special biennials and exhibitions of student work on display throughout the year. The annual NEXT show, staged at the end of each academic year, displayed student senior thesis projects to the greater DC community.

=== 21st century ===
In 2014, a DC Superior Court-approved agreement saw the closure of the Gallery and the passing of most of the original collection into the public National Gallery of Art. The Flagg Building and college operations were handed over to the George Washington University, which today operates the Corcoran School of the Arts and Design within the Columbian College of Arts and Sciences.

In September 2014 the D.C. arts community held a funeral for the closing of the Corcoran School of Art.

== Academics ==
The Corcoran School of the Arts and Design currently offers the degrees of Bachelor of Fine Arts (in Fine Art, Fine Art Photography, Photojournalism, Graphic Design, Interaction Design, and Interior Architecture); Bachelor of Arts (in Fine Art, Art History, Theatre & Dance, and Music); Master of Fine Arts (in Fine Arts, Social Practice, Interior Architecture, Classical Acting, and Production Design); Master of Arts (in Art History, New Media Photojournalism, Museum Studies, Interaction Design, Exhibition Design, and—in partnership with the Smithsonian Associates—Decorative Arts and Design History); graduate certificates in Museum Collections Management and Care, and Museum Studies; and a joint BA/MA program. After merging with George Washington University, the Corcoran School of the Arts and Design discontinued their Interior Design and Art Education programs.

Students are exposed to internships with organizations including National Geographic Magazine, embassies, and White House news photographers; summer study abroad trips in Italy, Greece, and India; and visiting artists such as Annie Leibovitz, Shepard Fairey, Maya Lin, Abelardo Morell, and William Pope. For a period of time in the spring, senior students' works for their senior theses are exhibited within the museum, giving the students experience in gallery openings as well as public exposure to their work.

The College's Continuing Education Program, which offers non-credit classes to teens and adults, draws hundreds of participants every year.

== Notable alumni ==
Notable Alumni of the Corcoran School

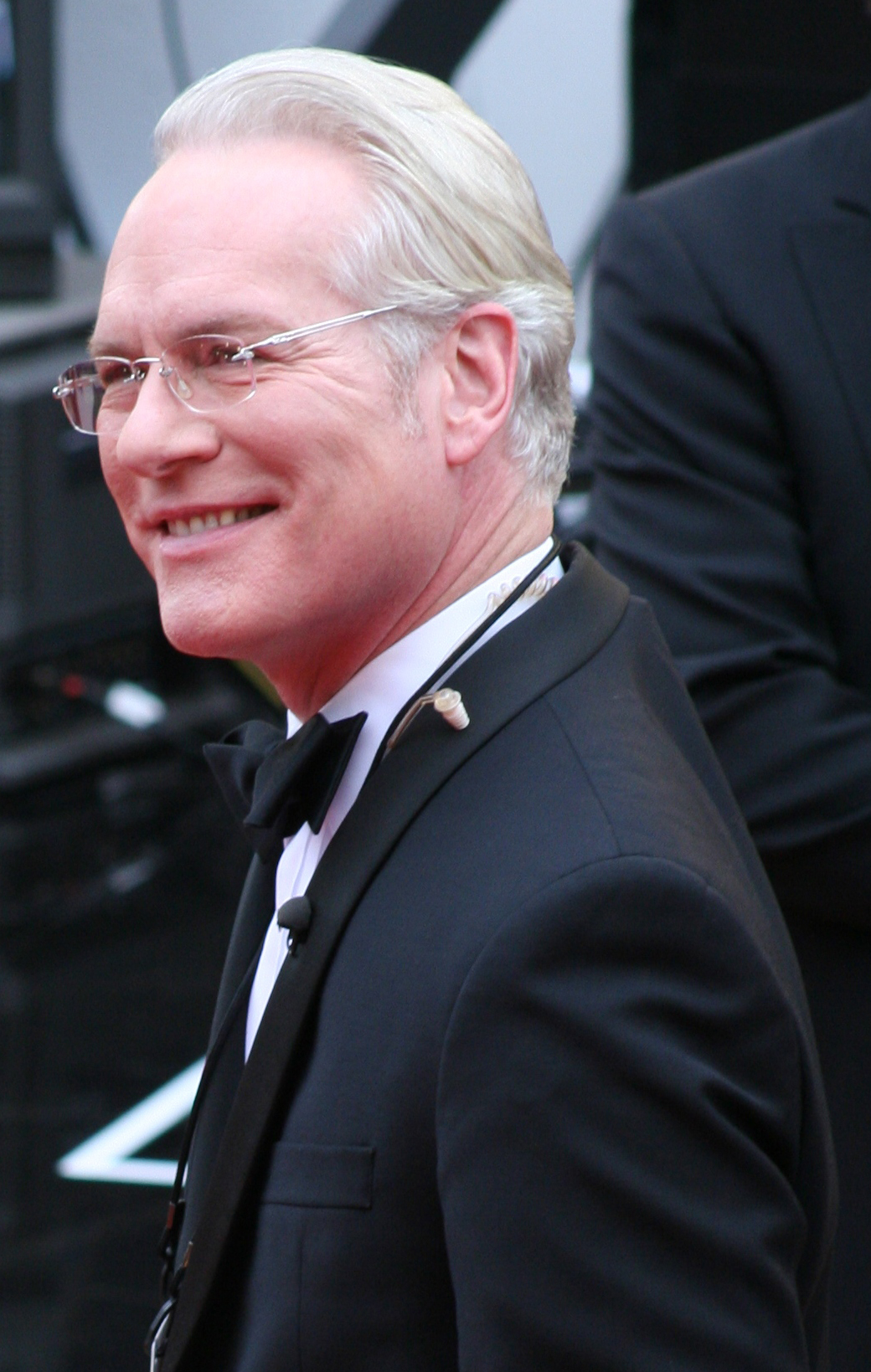
Tim Gunn, Project Runway star, Fashion Chair at Parsons School of Design

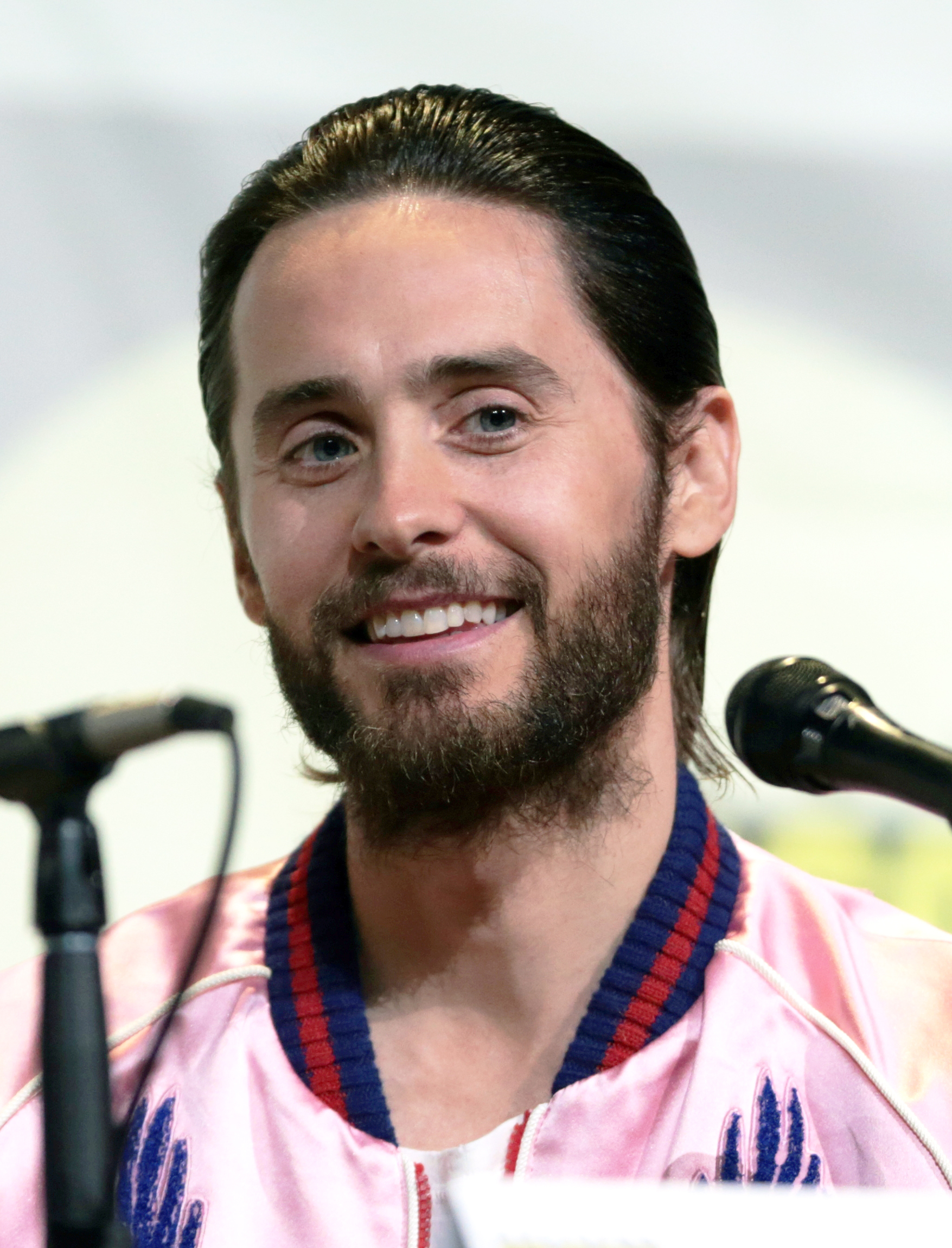
Jared Leto, Golden Globe and Oscar-winning actor

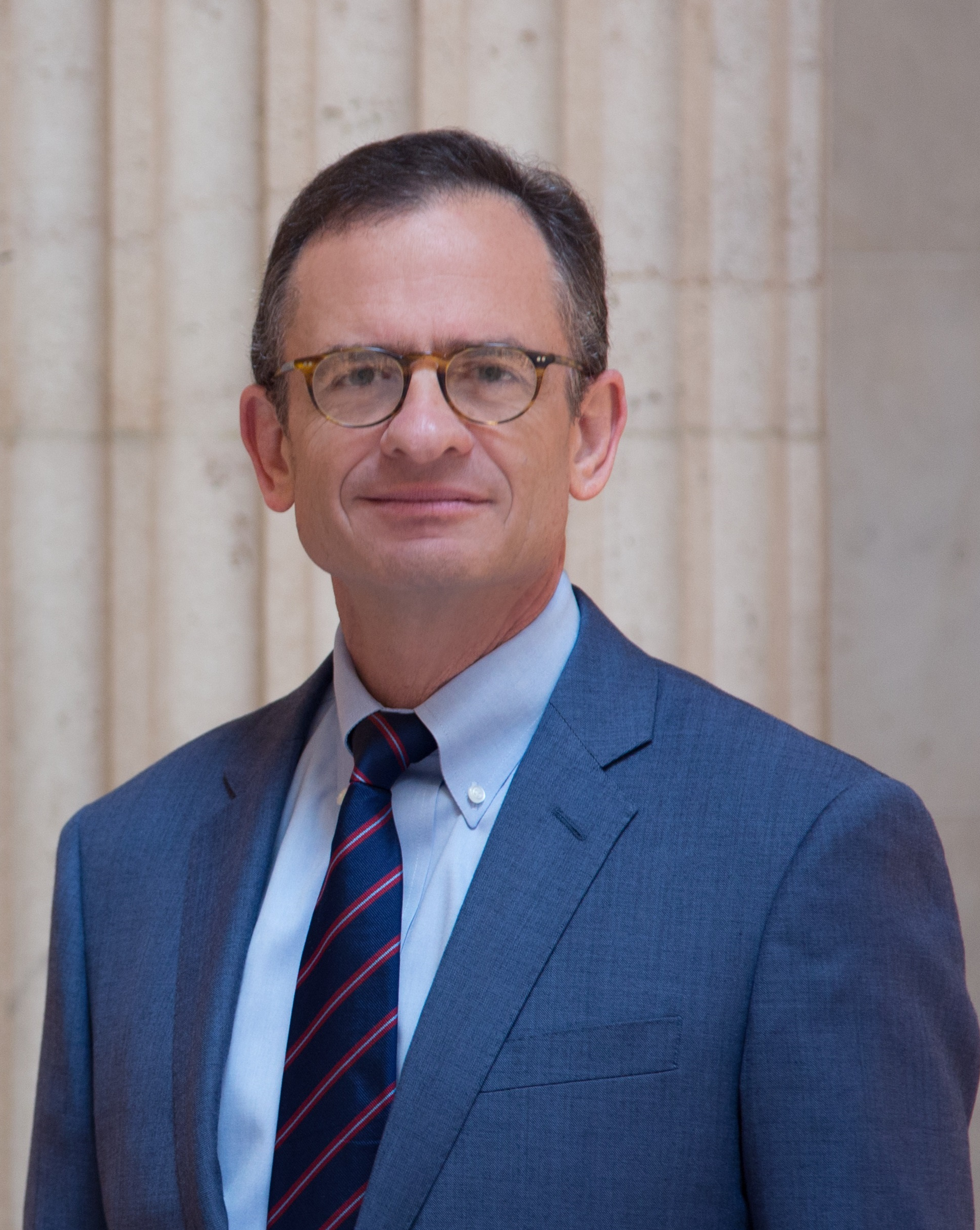
Daniel H. Weiss, President & CEO the Metropolitan Museum of Art

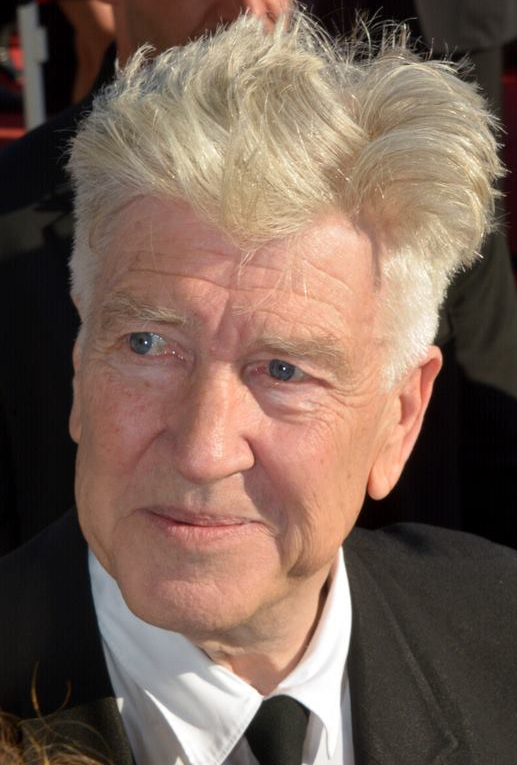
David Lynch, Palme d'Or-winning and Emmy Award-nominated actor

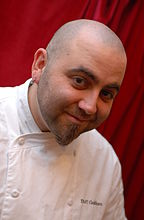
Duff Goldman, star of Ace of Cakes

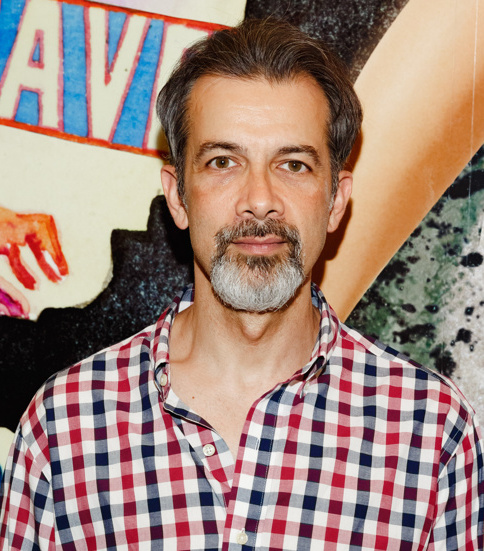
Dariush Kashani, Tony Award-winning actor

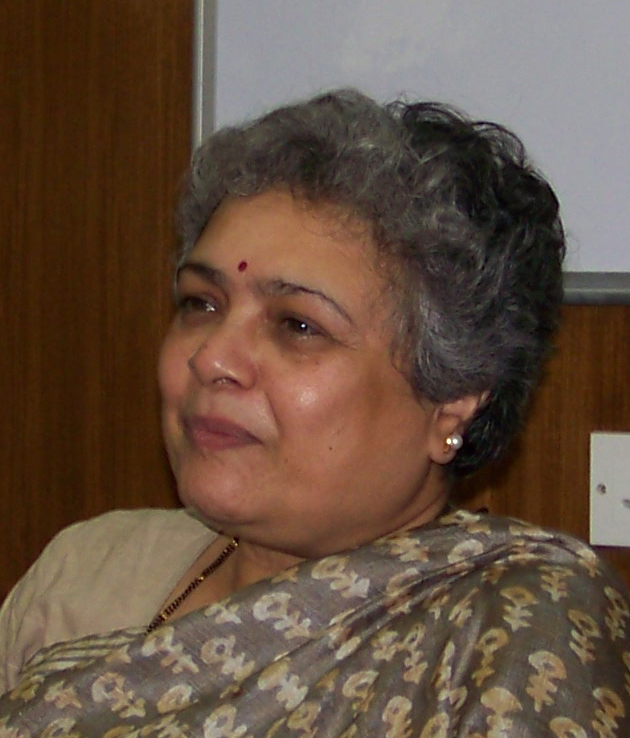
Mrinal Pande, Chair of Prasar Bharati, India's largest public broadcaster

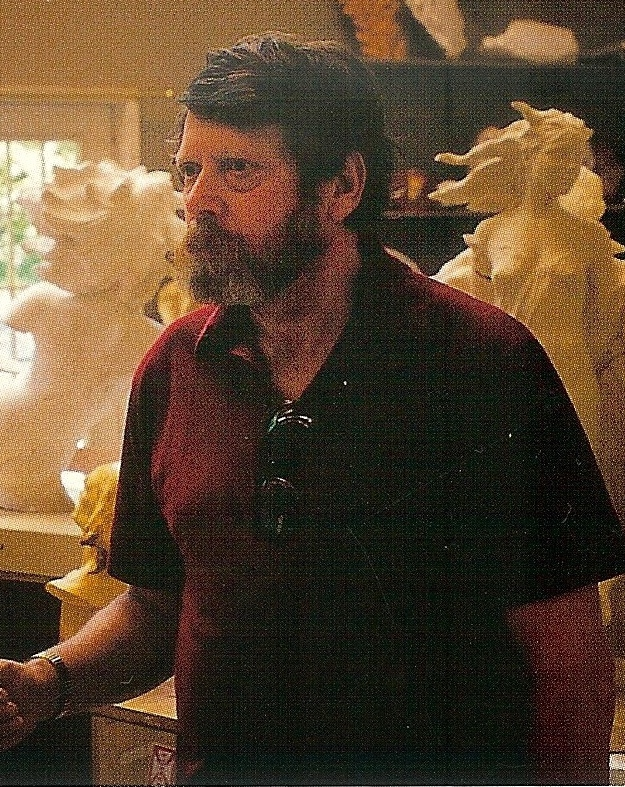
Frederick Hart, National Medal of Arts-winning sculptor, U.S. Fine Arts Commission member

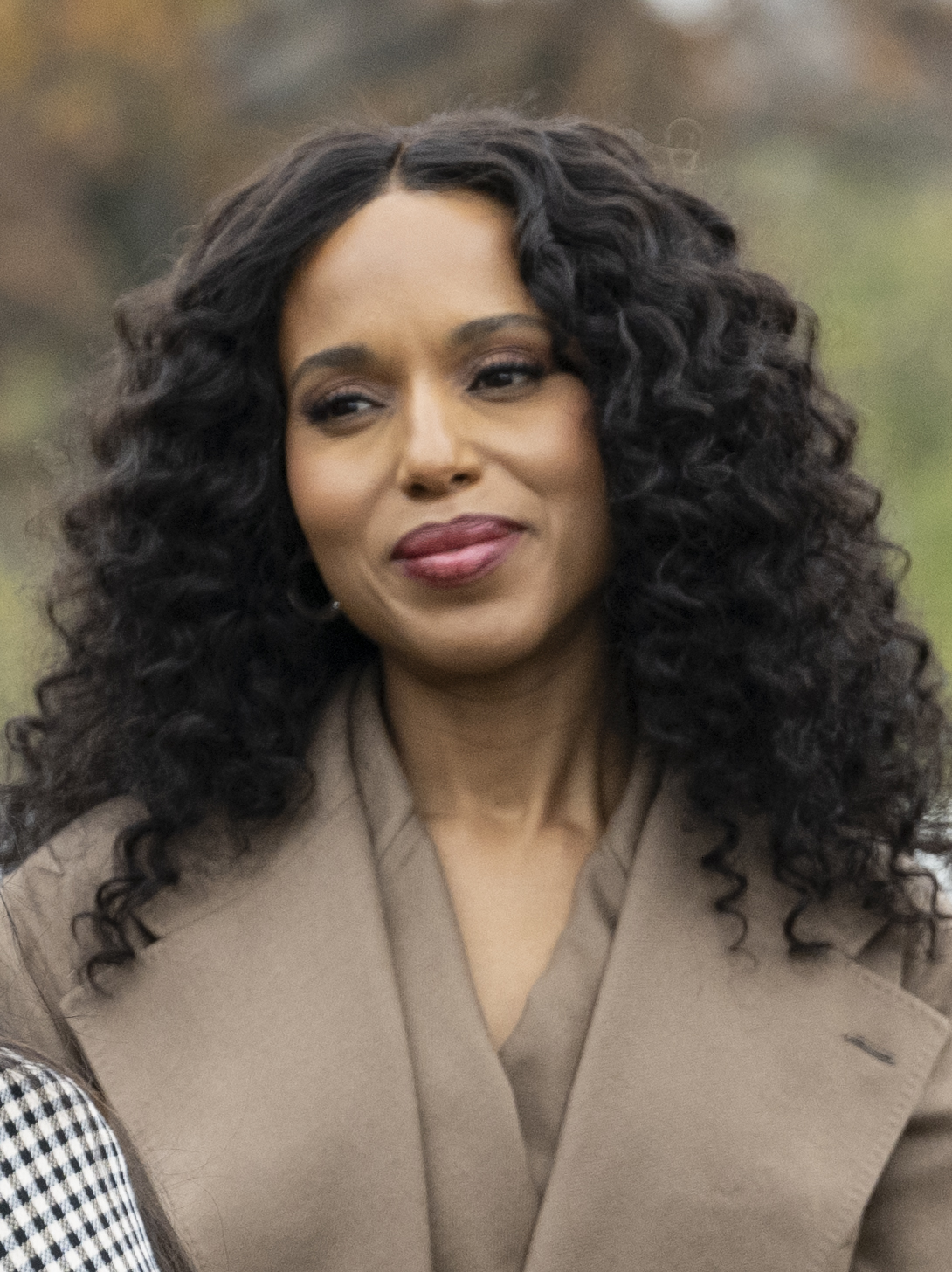
Actor Kerry Washington in 2024

Notable alumni include:

- Pacita Abad, Filipino-born Ivatan and American painter and mixed media artist
- Ernest C. Bairstow, English-born American sculptor, known for carving the Gettysburg Address on the Lincoln Memorial
- Aurelius Battaglia, former Disney artist and children's book illustrator
- Gladys Edgerly Bates, sculptor
- Thomas Hart Benton, regionalist painter
- Ned Bittinger (MFA 1983), portrait painter and illustrator
- Judy Byron, contemporary artist
- Javier Cabada, Spanish-born American abstract artist
- Morris Cafritz, real estate developer, philanthropist
- Ruth Chew, author
- Gregory Coates, artist
- Tara Donovan, installation artist
- Bjorn Peter Egeli, Norwegian-born American portrait painter
- Edwin Finckel, composer
- Duff Goldman, pastry and cake chef, television personality
- Eugene Goossen, art critic and historian
- Bernard O. Gruenke, stained glass artist
- Tim Gunn, fashion expert and television personality
- Francine Haskins, multi-media textile artist and book illustrator
- Frederick Hart, sculptor
- Nan Hoover, photographer, video artist, and performance artist
- Bruce Jurgens, artist and producer
- Dariush Kashani, film, stage and television actor
- Kim Kirkpatrick, photographer
- Nadezhda Kouteva, Bulgarian artist
- Jared Leto, musician and film actor
- David Lynch, filmmaker, painter, composer, video artist and performance artist
- Eugene J. Martin, visual artist
- Percy Martin, printmaker and art teacher
- Jody Mussoff, ceramist
- Spencer Baird Nichols, painter, illustrator and muralist
- Madiha Omar, Iraqi painter
- Mrinal Pande, Indian journalist and author
- Sabrina Raaf, photographer, sculptor
- Sonya Rapoport, feminist artist, conceptual artist, and new media artist
- Josephine Lutz Rollins, painter and watercolor artist
- Salarrué, Salvadoran writer, poet, and painter
- Ian Svenonius, musician and author
- Elliott Thompson. artist
- Kerry Washington (BA 1998), film actress and film producer
- Daniel H. Weiss (BA 1979), president and chief operating officer of Metropolitan Museum of Art,
- Kathryn Zaremba, television actress, formerly on Full House and Toothless
