= Lynda Gravátt =

American actress (1947–2024)

- Born: May 24, 1947; Harlem, New York, U.S.
- Died: February 23, 2024 (aged 76); New Brunswick, New Jersey, U.S.
- Education: Howard University
- Years active: 1951–2023
- Children: 2
- Relatives: June Cross (half sister)
- Awards: Theatre World Award (1999) AUDELCO Award in 2004

Lynda Gravátt (May 24, 1947 – February 23, 2024) was an American actress of theatre, film and television.

== Early life and career ==
Gravátt was born in Harlem on May 24, 1947. She was raised by adoptive parents. She appeared on Broadway at the age of 4 in The King and I and performed in recitals at Carnegie Hall when she was at the age of 9. Gravátt attended Fairmont Heights High School and then Howard University, where she appeared in numerous productions before graduating in 1971. While in college, she also acted at the Living Stage. She was a founding member of the stage. She also performed with DC Black Repertory, a company founded by Robert Hooks and Vantile Whitfield. On Broadway, in 2001, she portrayed Ruby in King Hedley II and portrayed Bessie James in 45 Seconds from Broadway, then appeared as Mrs. Muller in 2016 in Doubt. Her final Broadway appearance was in 2008 when she portrayed the role Big Mama in Cat on a Hot Tin Roof. She performed at venues including the Kennedy Center, Hartford Stage, Ford's Theatre, McCarter Theatre, Berkeley Repertory Theatre, the Mark Taper Forum, the Alabama Shakespeare Festival, and the Alley Theatre. She had a recurring role on One Life to Live. Her stage résumé included the productions A Raisin in the Sun, Crowns, Miss Witherspoon, The Little Foxes, Skeleton Crew, The House That Will Not Stand and her final theater appearance, in 2018, The Revolving Cycles Truly and Steadily Roll’d.

Gravátt began acting in film and television with a role in Good to Go. Gravátt's television credits included The Hoop Life, three Law & Order series, Sex and the City, The Good Wife, 30 Rock, Elementary, Madam Secretary, Ramy and East New York. She made guest appearances on Person of Interest. She acted in Dividing the Estate. She also acted in The Architect, I Hate Valentine's Day, Rockefeller Plaza 30, The Person of Person, Dear Edward, Get Your Ex, Elementary (season 1 episode 16), and The Bad Father. Her film credits included The Bounty Hunter (2010), Delivery Man (2013), Roman J. Israel, Esq. (2017) and The Outside Story (2020). She also acted in Violet & Daisy.

Gravátt was nominated for four AUDELCO awards and two Drama League Awards. Gravátt received a 1999 Theatre World Award for her performance as Quilly McGrath in The Old Settler and a AUDELCO Award in 2004 for her portrayal of Mrs. Dickson in Intimate Apparel. Gravátt was also the recipient of the Helen Hayes Award in 2004. Gravátt was a founding faculty member at the Duke Ellington School of the Arts as well as teaching at Howard University helping many launch their careers, as mentioned by Dave Chappelle on one of his Specials. She Taught at Rutgers University as well.

== Personal life and death ==
Gravátt was the half sister of June Cross. She had two children and five grandchildren. Gravátt died at a hospital in New Brunswick, New Jersey, on February 23, 2024, at the age of 76.
