= Judy Byron =

American artist

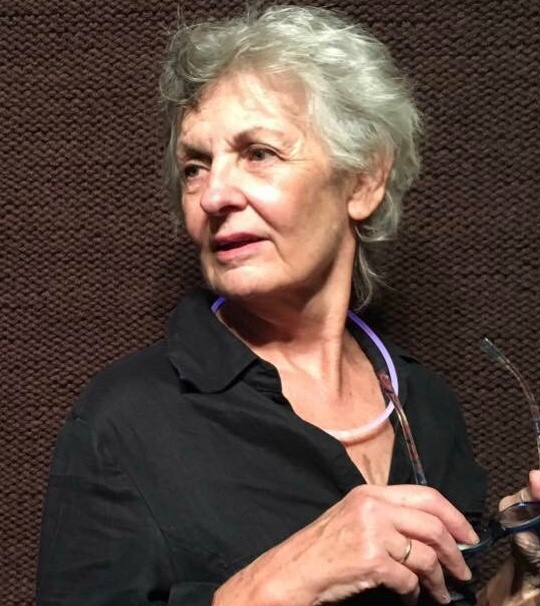
- Born: North Syracuse, New York, U.S.
- Education: Ithaca College
- Known for: Multimedia
- Website: judybyron.com

Judy Byron is a multimedia artist and activist based in Washington, D.C. Her work has been recognized by the National Endowment for the Arts, the Mid Atlantic Arts Foundation and the DC Commission on the Arts and Humanities.

== Early life and education ==
Byron was born in North Syracuse, New York and grew up in a working-class Italian Irish family. She received her bachelor's degree in speech and drama from Ithaca College in Ithaca, NY and studied printmaking at the Corcoran School of the Arts and Design in Washington, D.C.

After receiving her B.A., Byron volunteered for Gene McCarthy and the California farm workers. When she moved to Washington, D.C., Judy Byron worked as a teacher at Cardozo High School. She is married to photographer Rick Reinhard.

== Art ==
Byron has consciously moved away from traditional gallery spaces and displays her work in public spaces and her home. Byron's work consists of mostly drawings and portraits and she engages in an interactive process with the people and spaces represented in her work. For example, in her project “One to One” (1992–1993) Byron worked with DC-area teenagers to create large portraits; she visited them at a place in which they were comfortable and documented the moment with photographs. The teenagers then visited Byron's studio as she created these portraits and took part in a writing workshop with playwright and artist Rebecca Rice.

Byron has collaborated with other artists throughout her projects, such as poet Chasen Gaver and, as mentioned above, Rebecca Rice.

Byron uses a variety of materials, such as crayon, wood, and paper. She has employed several techniques for her projects, such as printmaking, engraving, woodcutting, and photography. Her art focuses around themes of identity, belonging, growing up, and everyday rural or city life.

In 1993, Byron received a $33,000 commission from the North Carolina Council for the Arts to create sixteen woodblock rubbings based on photos of North Carolinians. For the project, Byron spent two weeks traveling in North Carolina taking the photographs she would use for carving the woodblocks.

Solo and Group Exhibitions
Year	Title	Location
1982	Groups	Northern Virginia Community College
1988	In Common: Arlington County Observed	Arlington Arts Center
1990	Art Against AIDS on the Road	Sawtooth Center for the Arts
1991	We Are Your Sons and Daughters	Martin Luther King Jr. Library
1992	Home	Arlington Arts Center
1994	Artists + Community	National Museum of Women in the Arts
2006	Where I Live: Exploring Identity through Bodies and Clothing	Artist House Installation
2008	WHAT MATTERS	Artist House Installation
2008	Picturing Politics: Artists Speak to Power	Arlington Arts Center
2009	What's Important Now?	Nevin Kelly Gallery
2010	Sweet Sixteen	American University, Katzen Arts Center Museum
2011	IN FLUX: WHAT MATTERS	Joan Hisaoka Gallery, Smith Center for the Healing Arts
2011	Perfect Girls	Artist House Installation
2014	Continental Drift	American University, Katzen Arts Center Museum

== Corcoran Artist Mentorship Program ==
Judy Byron studied at the Corcoran School of the Arts and Design and later taught a course in “collaborative art”. She later founded the Corcoran Artist Mentorship Program, which was recognized by the National Endowment for the Arts and the President's Committee on the Arts and Humanities.

== Activism ==
In the 1980s, Byron was involved in starting the DC-based group, Black Artists/White Artists, which met to discuss issues of race and art.

Judy Byron's activism is incorporated into her artistic projects. Her project “One to One” incorporated a mentorship component for the teenagers who participated, including journal-writing workshops. In 1988, Byron created a woodcut for an AIDS awareness campaign with the slogan “AIDS touches us all”, which was displayed around Washington, DC.
