= Elliott Thompson =

American painter

- Born: Axel Elliott Thompson; May 25, 1912; Newport, Rhode Island
- Died: February 28, 2016 (aged 103); Fairfax, Virginia
- Known for: Artist

Elliott Thompson (25 May 1912 – 28 February 2016) was an American artist known for his non-objective abstract paintings. Active from the late 1960s through the 1970s, Thompson created hard-edged geometric abstractions using oil and acrylic on prepared or raw canvas. His early paintings were black and white, while later ones were colored, mainly with monochromatic backgrounds. Critics described his style as mathematical—marked by precise, systematic compositions—evoking musical emotions.

He received his training in Paris at Académie André Lhote and in Washington, DC, at the Corcoran School of Art. He began his art career in midlife, following retirement from work as a civil servant in the US government. During the 1970s, his work received extensive reviews from local critics when exhibited in solo and group shows at Washington galleries. In the 1980s, as his eyesight began to decline and as his style of abstract art began to lose favor, Thompson chose to stop painting, focusing instead on teaching and personal projects.

== Early life and training ==
Thompson was raised in Washington, DC, and was educated in public schools through junior high. His parents then sent him to Briarly Hall Military Academy in Poolesville, Maryland, but he left in 1929 without a diploma and joined the US Navy. He attended a class in mechanical drawing in junior high but received no art education at Briarly. Serving in the rank of seaman, he spent the next four years on ships and ashore. During this time, although he had no art training or previous inclination to paint, he made his first artistic foray when he volunteered to make a painting of an officer's swimming pool.

On being discharged from the Navy, he found work in Washington, DC, as a press officer for the newly formed National Recovery Administration. Over the course of the next 34 years, he worked as an accountant or financial officer in both civilian agencies and units of the US Army. Early in 1954, while assigned to a postwar reconstruction project in Paris, he felt a strong urge to paint, bought some supplies, and set up an easel on the city's streets. He later said, "I knew a little about drawing, so I put up a canvas. The first thing I tried to paint was Notre-Dame Cathedral. I just painted whatever came out of the paintbrush." That experiment led him to seek formal instruction for the first time. Later that year, he enrolled in an academy run by the cubist artist André Lhote. Working evenings and weekends, he produced small still lifes. He understood little French but enough to understand that Lhote dismissed his early efforts as those of a Sunday painter. He persevered, however, and eventually his innate skill and hard work won the artist's respect. Regarding this time, he later said that by then he was "doing better work, and a lot more work, than some of the full-time students." He continued evening and weekend painting after leaving Lhote's atelier but was not then ready to begin a career as a professional artist.

After returning to Washington, DC, in 1958, Thompson stopped painting as work and family obligations began to take up most of his time and an intermittent struggle with alcohol dependence resumed. Nine years later he retired from federal service, returned to Washington from an overseas job with the Army, and decided to enroll in the Corcoran School of Art. Asked to select a teacher, he chose a recently arrived Welshman named Roy Slade. (Note: Slade was appointed as a visiting teacher at the Corcoran in 1967. He later received a permanent appointment and, in 1970, was named the school's dean. In 1972, he became director of the Corcoran Gallery.)

== Career in art ==
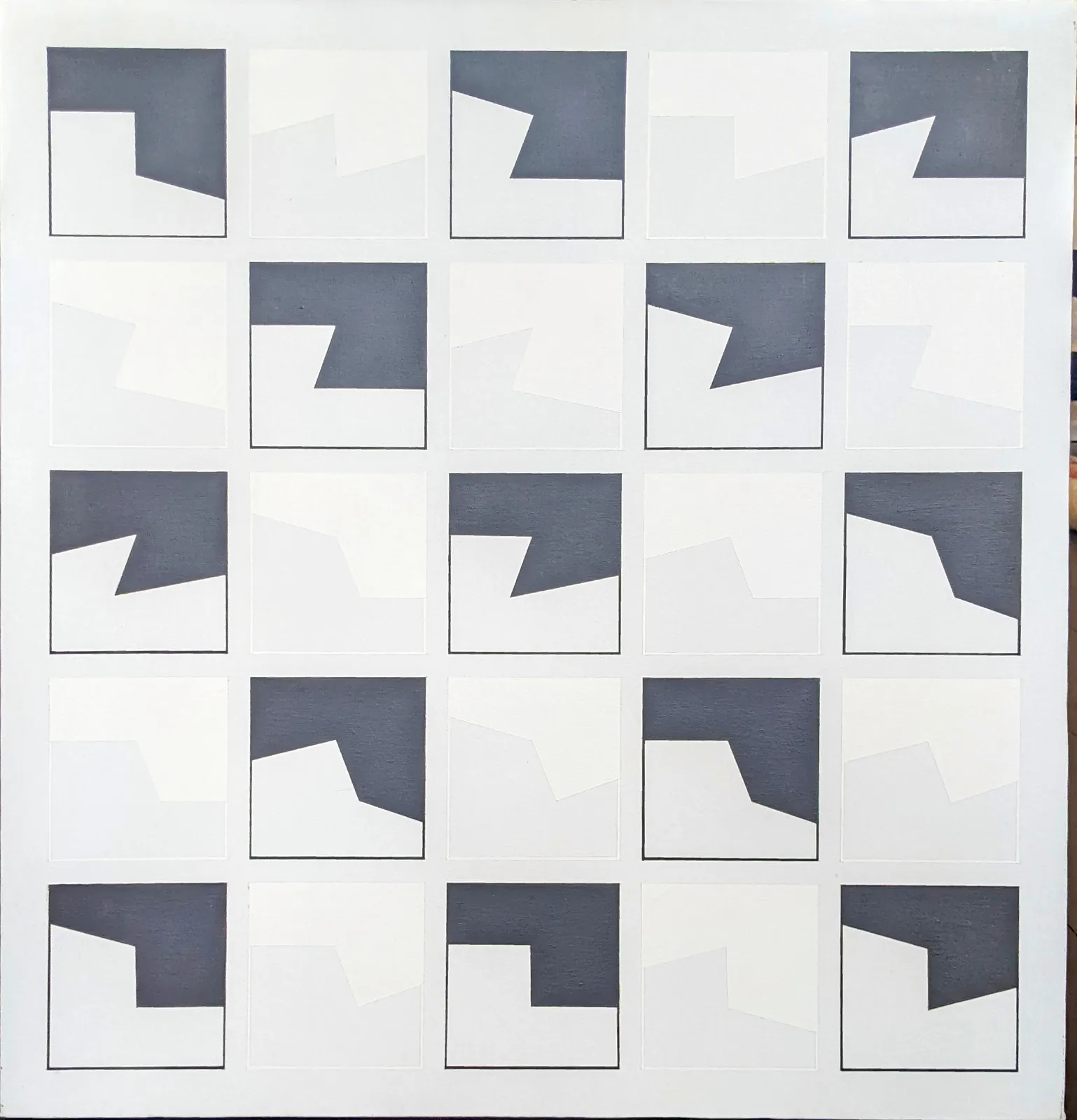
Elliott Thompson, 1964, Three Forty Six, acrylic and tape on canvas, 45 x 45 inches

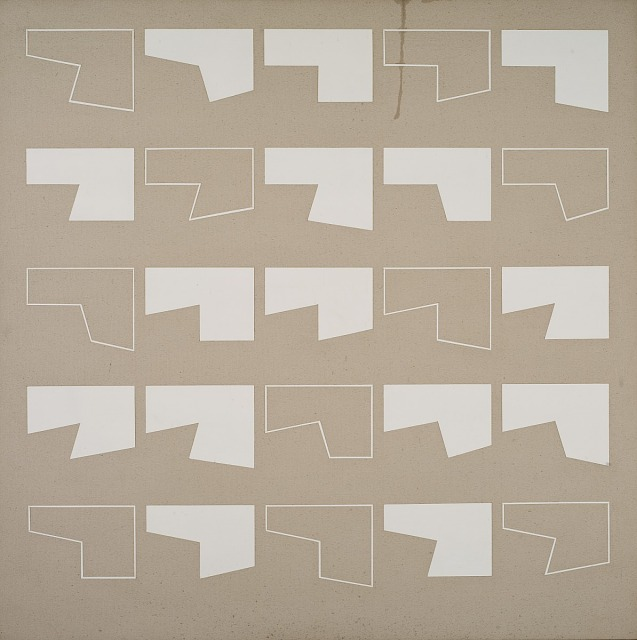
Elliott Thompson, 1969, Three 18, acrylic on canvas, 45 x 45 inches

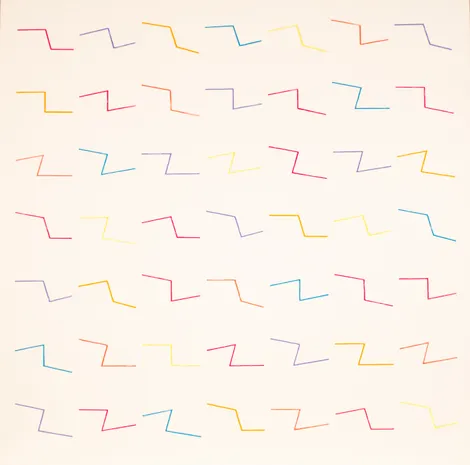
Elliott Thompson, 1971, Zig Zag, acrylic on canvas, 41 x 41 inches

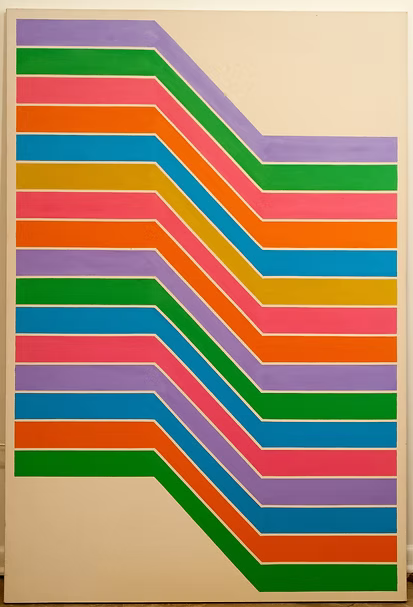
Elliott Thompson, 1972, Big Z One, acrylic on canvas, 62 x 42 inches

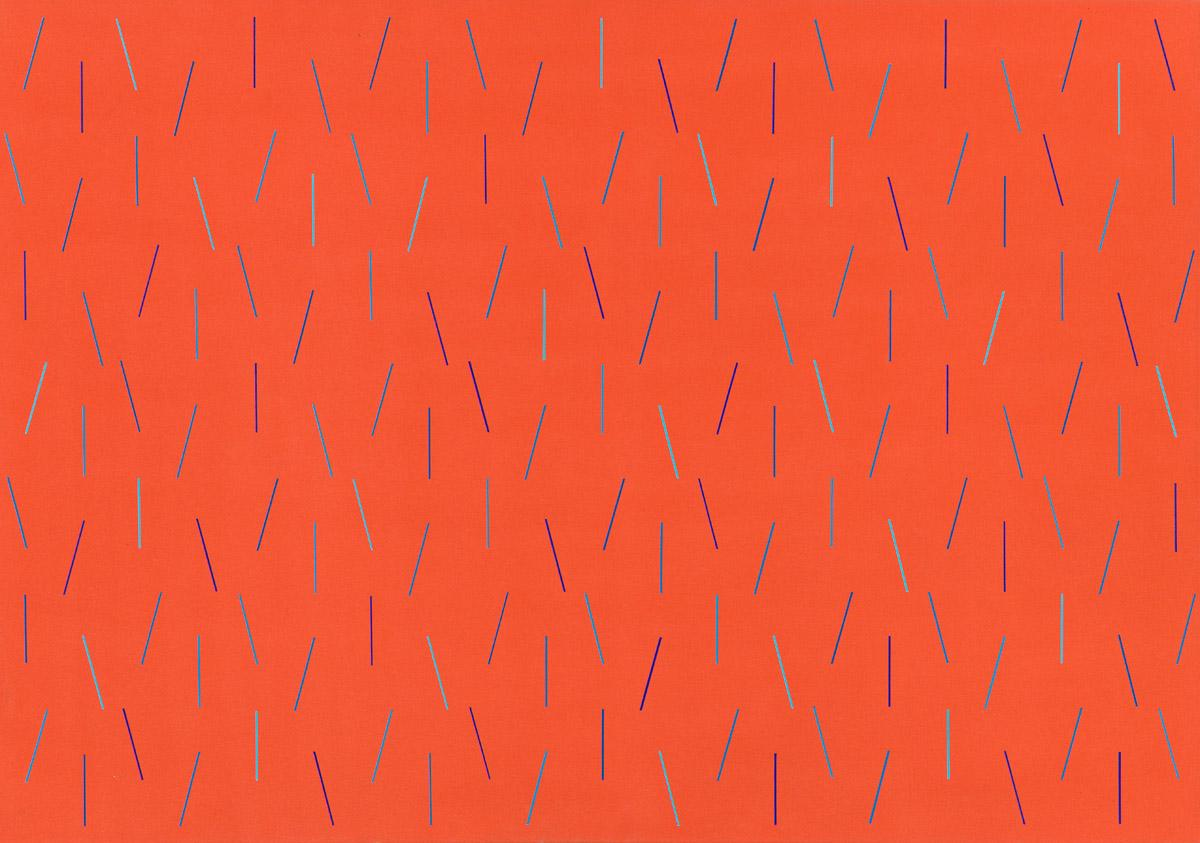
Elliott Thompson, Eleven Thirteen, 1972, acrylic on canvas, 44 x 63 inches

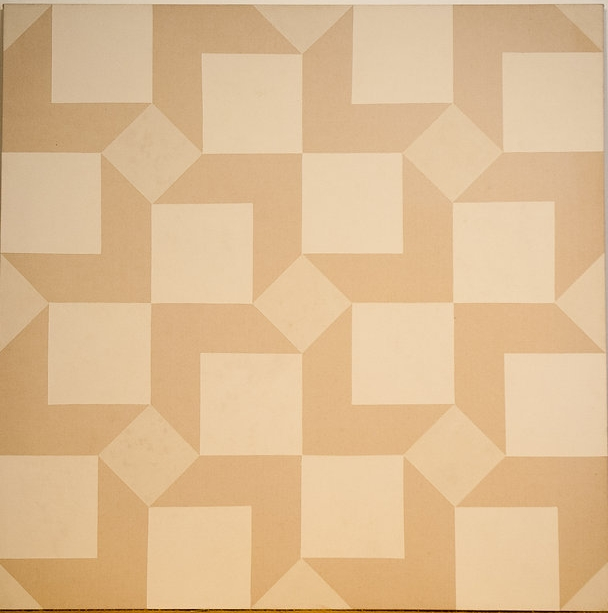
Elliott Thompson, 1979, Cube Three, acrylic on canvas, 45 x 45 inches

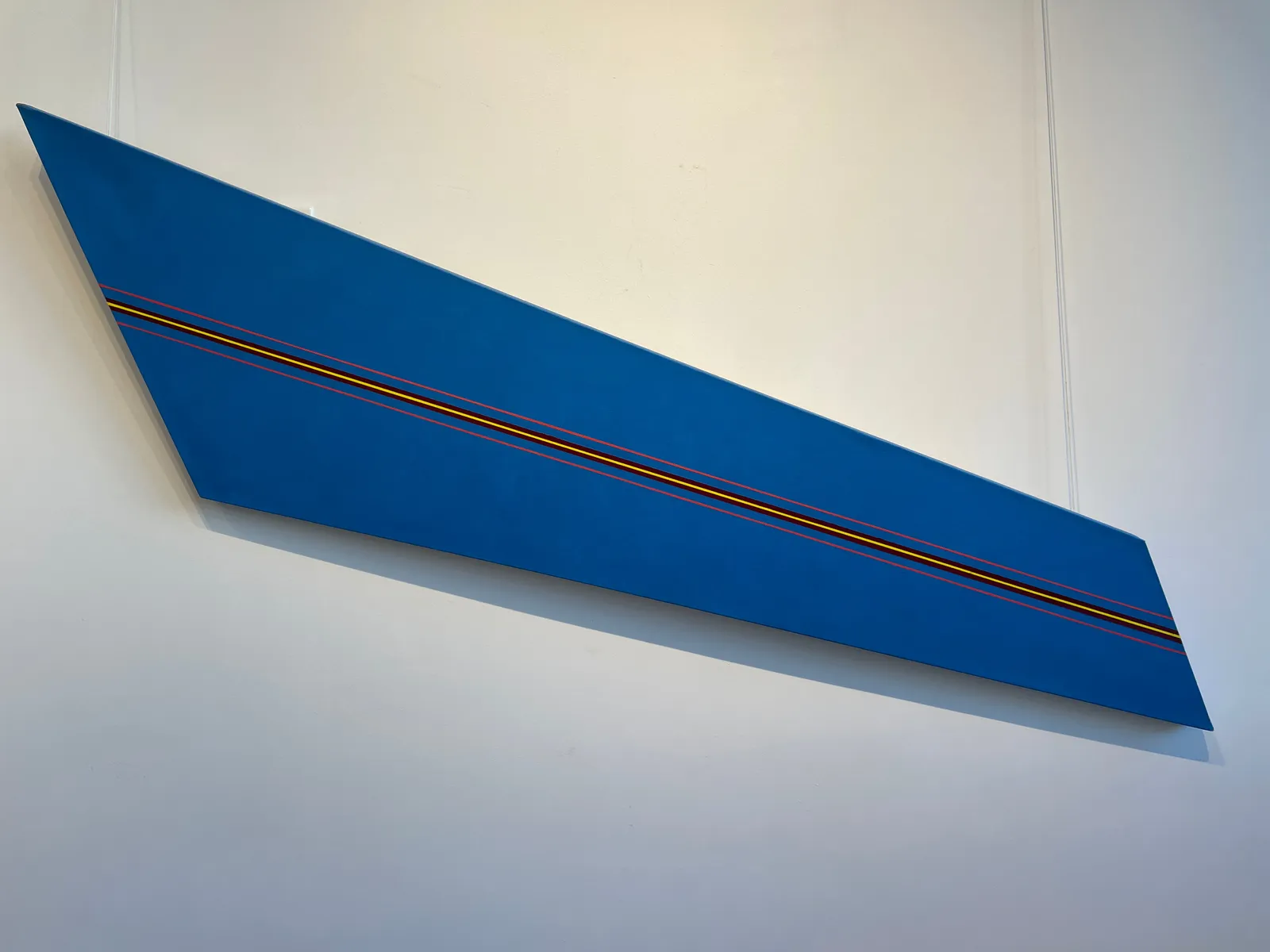
Elliott Thompson, 1988, Blue Trapezoid, acrylic on canvas, 18 x 72 inches

At the end of his art career, Thompson said he had been thinking of becoming an art professional since the time he spent working at Lhote's atelier. The retirement income he began to receive in 1967 gave him the security he felt he needed to make the shift from bureaucrat to professional artist.

Lhote had let his students paint as they pleased and limited his instruction to weekly critiques of their work. Slade focused on basic design, stressing color theory, line, and form. At first, Thompson continued to produce mainly still lifes but on switching from oil to acrylic pigments, he began making entirely abstract paintings.

At age 55, he was one of Slade's most mature students. Since he was also one of the most diligent and reliable, Slade began to rely on him to direct the class during his frequent lecture travels and eventually accepted him as an assistant teacher. Thompson later directed Corcoran's Saturday classes and became a full-time faculty member. In 1979, he was appointed director of the school's summer program in Maine.

In 1968, Thompson rented for use as a studio a two-room apartment near Washington, DC's West End. The next year, he moved to larger quarters at the top of a townhouse between the Woodley Park and Adams Morgan neighborhoods.

Thompson contributed a small abstract painting to an exhibition called "Alliance for Art" that was staged in 1968 to benefit UNESCO and the library of Brandeis University. Other exhibitors included Henry Moore, Roy Lichtenstein, Helen Frankenthaler, and Robert Motherwell. The following year, Thompson participated in three group shows: the Maryland Regional Exhibition at the Baltimore Museum of Art, an exhibition of 17 Washington painters held at the Ringling Museum of Art in Sarasota, and, as his first appearance in a commercial gallery, an exhibition of four Washington artists at the Jefferson Place Gallery.

The early 1970s were a highly productive period for Thompson. During this time, he participated in the Art in Embassies Program of the US Department of State. He showed paintings in a rotating exhibition held at the White House. One of his paintings was included in the Smithsonian Institution Traveling Exhibition Services program. The Jefferson Place Gallery mounted solo exhibitions of his work in 1970, 1971, and 1973. In 1971, Thompson participated in three shows with other Washington artists. The first was a traveling exhibition that opened in Columbia, South Carolina and the second was a show at the gallery of the International Monetary Fund. The third was a major exhibition at The Phillips Collection. He also participated in an art auction to benefit the Washington, D.C., chapter of the Women's National Abortion Action Coalition in 1972 . In 1974, the Corcoran Gallery gave him a solo exhibition of 48 paintings.

After the closure of the Jefferson Place Gallery in 1974, Thompson's production began to decline. While focusing much of his attention on teaching and on the work he put into turning a townhouse he had bought into a studio, he was still able to produce two series of paintings, one in black, white, and gray on square canvases and the other in colors on trapezoidal canvases.

In 1980, the United States Information Agency sent Thompson and a young sculptor, Robert Stackhouse, as US representatives in a summer workshop in Bulgaria. Later that year, he signed with the short-lived Barbara Fiedler Gallery in Washington and showed nine rectangular and six trapezoid paintings in a solo exhibition there. In reviewing the show, critics Paul Richards of the Washington Post and Ben Forgey of the Washington Star said that while Thompson persisted in a style that was no longer popular, the paintings were well made. Richards praised their "rush and zing" and Forgey their musicality.

In 1981, Thompson signed with Gallery K in Washington. In 1984, his work appeared in two shows at that gallery. The first, held in July, was a group exhibition. The second, held in December, was a two-person exhibition. In 1989, the gallery produced a show called "30 Years Later", which brought together Thompson and 18 other Washington artists. Some of the artists were still active. Others, including Thompson, had shown infrequently in recent years. In 1990, the gallery at Marymount University in Northern Virginia showed six of Thompson's paintings.

In 1987, glaucoma caused Thompson's eyesight to begin to fail, and, his style having lost favor with collectors, he ceased to paint. He was then 75 and would live another 29 years.

=== Artistic style ===
Thompson's earliest paintings contained geometric shapes in black and white. Reviewing them in 1969, the critic Paul Richard called them "mathematical and sequential, formal, disciplined, austere." He said they elicited a "rich and almost musical" mood that was achieved "by following exactly a mathematical score." He planned them beforehand using a formal system that he found difficult to explain. After he began to paint in color, his work remained, as another critic said, "highly systematic, internally consistent, and resilient". Thompson's compositions contained shapes based on squares, lines, and zig-zag patterns. Seen together, the shaped canvases of the late paintings struck Paul Richards as resembling "brightly colored roadways seen in perspective." He said the paintings gave a "sense of rush, of accelerating speed" that was "heightened by the flicker, the electric op-art zing, that his colors generate." He said the square canvases in black, white, beige, and gray contained squares, lines, and cube shapes that sometimes looked like tilted planes and other times "call to mind arrangements of stacked cubes seen in isometric perspective." In 1980, a critic wrote of the late paintings, "Thompson does not play; the paintings he is showing are the opposite of messy. Instead, they have the tension and the gleam of a stainless steel wire pulled absolutely taut." Thompson often gave his paintings coded titles, either plain numbers or alphanumeric designations.

== Personal life and family ==
Thompson was born on May 25, 1912, in Newport, Rhode Island, and raised from the age of two in Washington, DC. His birth name was Axel Elliott Thompson.

Thompson's father was Axel Kolbjorn Thompson. At his birth in Norway in 1972, he was christened Axel Kolbjørn Thomassen and changed the spelling of his name on emigrating in 1889. He served for many years as a carpenter in the US Navy and after retiring worked as a carpenter for the United States Naval Research Laboratory. Thompson's mother was Elise Sophie Andersen Thompson. A homemaker, she was born in Norway in 1884. Thompson's parents married in 1911 in Brooklyn, New York. He had two sisters, Elise, born in 1913, and Margareth, born in 1915. During his childhood, the family mostly spoke Norwegian at home.

Thompson's first job after leaving the Navy in 1933 was with the newly established press office of the National Recovery Administration. Between 1933 and 1940, he studied part-time and received a bachelor's degree in accounting from the Benjamin Franklin University School of Accountancy and Financial Administration in Washington, D.C. (Note: In 1987, Benjamin Franklin University closed and its students offered reduced-fee enrollment in George Washington University.)

During his long career in federal service, Thompson frequently changed jobs in search of promotion and better pay. He later said, "If the work became routine or boring, or offered no challenge or opportunity for advancement, I saw no reason to hang around." He left the press office in 1935 to become a contract auditor in the General Services Administration. He subsequently was hired as a chief clerk at the National Bituminous Coal Commission. When, in 1939, the commission was disbanded, he became a budget examiner in the Bureau of the Budget (now Office of Management and Budget), dealing with the funding needs of federal agencies during World War II. At the close of the war, the bureau assigned him to a small agency called the Office of the Director of Liquidation, dealing with the termination of the war agencies.

During 1946, Thompson took an extended medical leave in an attempt to recover from alcohol abuse and a year later became an auditor for the San Francisco office of the War Assets Administration. In 1949, he returned to Washington to serve as a budget officer in the Public Health Service. In 1952, he returned to his old job in San Francisco and the following year was again in Washington, this time working on post-war reconstruction in the Department of Defense. In that capacity, he traveled to France to investigate the economic capability and military requirements of NATO member nations. In 1958, he worked as a civilian employee for the US Army at the Pentagon in Washington. In 1966, he became an administrator in the Army's Supply and Maintenance Agency, based in Orléans, France. When in 1966 France withdrew from the NATO military command structure, Thompson decided to retire rather than move to the agency's new headquarters in Germany.

=== Alcoholism ===
Thompson began drinking bootleg whiskey during the Prohibition Era, experiencing his first episode of drunken amnesia when he was 15. He drank and experienced periods of drunkenness while serving in the Navy and later as a civil servant during the 1930s. He later said the long hours and intense atmosphere of the war years kept him from drinking to excess at that time, but with the return of peace and normal working hours, he resumed heavy drinking. By 1949, he began to understand that he was dependent on alcohol and in 1950 began attending Alcoholics Anonymous meetings.

Late in life, he reported a conversation with a woman he was dating while living in Paris in 1954. He said, "I told her that I really couldn’t handle it, that it made me sick and that when I did drink, I often did and said things that I later wished I hadn’t and didn’t always remember." Despite this admission, he stopped attending AA meetings at that time. After his return to the United States in 1961, he resumed attending AA meetings and, as he later said, remained sober for the rest of his life

=== Marriages and children ===
After a brief romance, Thompson married his first wife, Ruth Duborg, in 1934. They had known each other for about two months and had dated only a few times. He later remembered little about the wedding. A cousin of Ruth's drove them to Towson, Maryland, where they found a place where couples could be married on the spot. He later said he'd probably been suffering from a drinking blackout because he had almost no memory of what happened. Two years later, he and Ruth had a son, Elliott Duborg Thompson. Thompson's health deteriorated during the period of his heaviest drinking in the late 1940s. On the advice of his doctor, he took extended leave from work. He left for Arizona with the understanding that he and Ruth would be briefly separated. Instead, she filed for divorce. He was at first surprised but came to realize that his drinking had led to a general deterioration of their marriage. He offered no opposition to her request.

While on extended leave, Thompson fell in love with a woman named Marcella Cain. Rather than wait the two years required by the state where his divorce had been filed (Virginia), he obtained permission from Ruth's lawyer to get a quick divorce in Mexico. In 1948, he married Marcella. The two remained married for eight years but were separated for about half that time. In 1950, they had a son named Marshall. In 1953 they had a daughter named Debra

Between 1958 and 1982, Thompson was married to a French divorcée named Renée J. Conlin. They had met while he was working in Paris and married after his return to Washington. Thompson later said that his excessive drinking was a factor in his decision to agree to marry her. He said his alcohol consumption was such that "it seems like I just didn’t care." In 1959, Thompson and Renée had a son named Axel René.

Thompson continued drinking heavily but received no support from Renée when, in 1961, he decided to resume attending AA meetings. When he then stopped drinking, his marriage began to fall apart. They were informally separated in the late 1960s when he rented an apartment to use as a studio and began spending most of his time there. He obtained a formal separation in 1975 and they divorced in 1982.

Early in 1983, Thompson sold his place in Washington and moved to a village called Fayence in the south of France. There he met the woman who would become his fourth and final wife. Later that year they married and the following year his new wife, Robin Berman Thompson, gave birth to a daughter whom they named Elisa. Three years later she gave birth to a son, Matthew. Soon thereafter, Thompson sold the house he had bought in Fayence. The family moved at first to Alexandria and later to Fairfax, Virginia, where he would spend the rest of his life.

Thompson died of multiple organ failure at the age of 103 on February 28, 2016.
