= Patricia Johanson =

American artist (1940–2024)

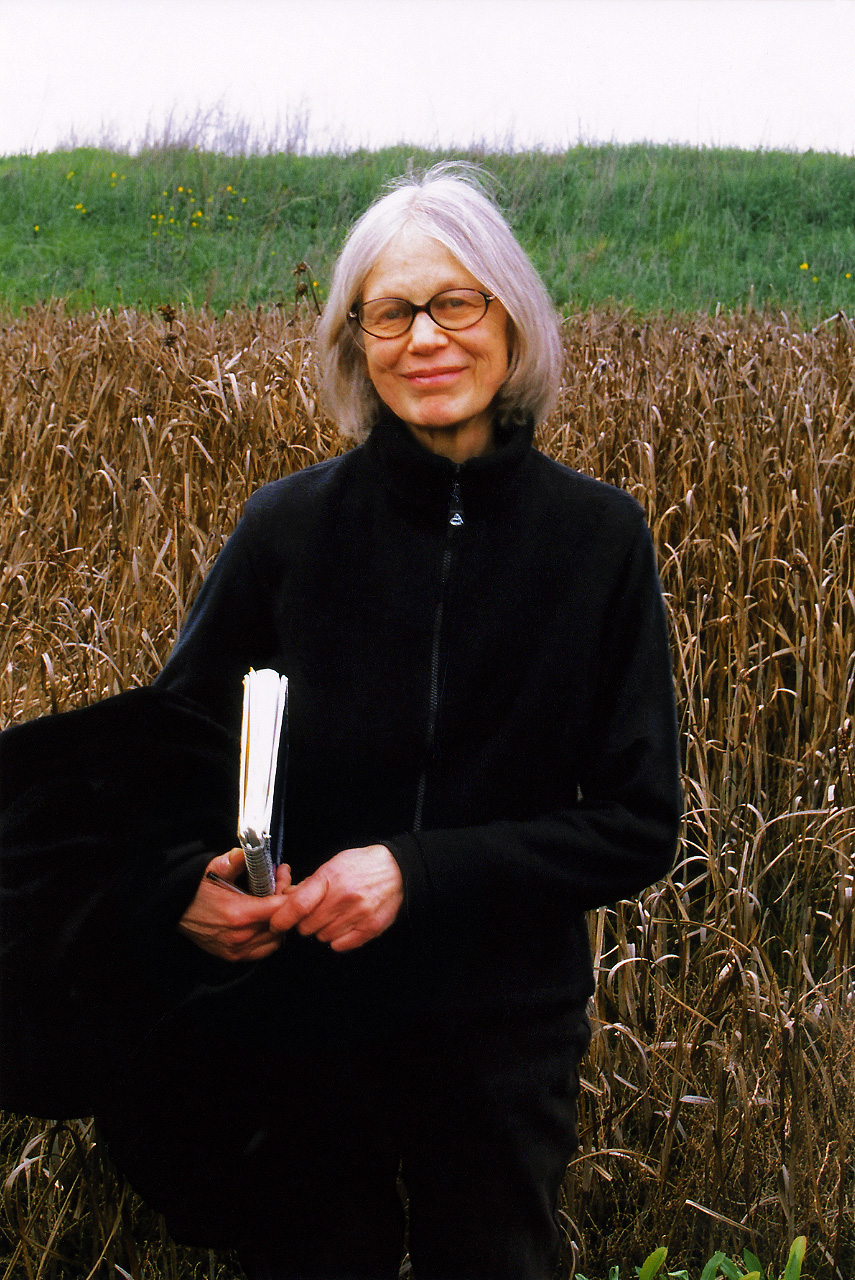
- Johanson in 2005
- Born: Patricia Johanson; September 8, 1940; New York City, New York, U.S.
- Died: October 16, 2024 (aged 84); Buskirk, New York, U.S.
- Education: Bennington College Hunter College CCNY Architecture School

Patricia Johanson (September 8, 1940 – October 16, 2024) was an American artist. Johanson is known for her large-scale art projects that create aesthetic and practical habitats for humans and wildlife. She designed her functional art projects, created with and in the natural landscape, to solve infrastructure and environmental problems, but also to reconnect city-dwellers with nature and with the history of a place. These project designs dated from 1969, making her a pioneer in the field of ecological-art (or eco-art.) Johanson's work has also been classified as Land Art, Environmental Art, Site-Specific Art, and Garden Art. Her early paintings and sculptures are part of Minimalism.

== Early life and education ==
Johanson grew up in New York City, where enjoyed spending time in Central Park and Prospect Park, as well as in the city's art museums. Her mother, a former model, introduced her to the arts. Her family later moved to Long Island, where she honed her skills as a clarinetist in the orchestra at Wellington C. Mepham High School in North Bellmore. After graduating in 1958, she went on to Bennington College in Vermont, where she earned a bachelor's degree in fine art in 1962.

Through her contacts at Bennington, Johanson became part of the 1960s New York art world. Her Bennington instructor, Tony Smith, was a close friend and her art history professor, Eugene Goossen, was a mentor and later became her husband. At this time she met fellow-artists Kenneth Noland, David Smith (sculptor), Helen Frankenthaler, Franz Kline, Philip Guston, and Joseph Cornell. She also came to know art critic Clement Greenberg and visionary architect Frederick John Kiesler.

Johanson earned a Master's in art history at Hunter College, New York in 1964. There she studied with Tony Smith, Eugene Goossen, and Ad Reinhardt and met fellow art students Robert Morris, Carl Andre, and Robert Barry. At this time, she worked as a researcher for New York publisher Benjamin Blom on a compendium of 18th and 19th century American artists. The project led to an opportunity to catalogue the work of Georgia O'Keeffe, who became an important mentor.

== Minimalist art works ==
Johanson's paintings and sculptures of the 1960s have been classified as Minimalism and they were included in some of the earliest shows of Minimal Art: “8 Young Artists” (1964), “Distillation” (1966) and “Cool Art” (1968). Her Minimalist paintings used simple lines to explore the optical effects of color. These were shown at the Tibor de Nagy Gallery in New York in the 1960s and her 28-foot-long (8.5 m) oil painting, "William Clark," was included in the 1968 Museum of Modern Art contemporary art survey, “The Art of the Real.” Another 28-foot-long canvas, “Minor Keith,” was exhibited at the Minimal Art retrospective at the Los Angeles Museum of Contemporary Art in 2004 and acquired by the Art Institute of Chicago in 2023.

Johanson began making large-scale, Minimal sculpture in 1966 with William Rush, consisting of 200 feet (61 m) of painted steel tee-beams laid flat in a clearing. In 1968 she increased her scale to 1,600 feet (490 m) with Stephen Long (inspired by the 19th century topographical and railway engineer), where 2-foot-wide (0.61 m), painted plywood segments were installed along an abandoned railroad track in Buskirk, New York. This was followed by other large-scale Minimalist sculptures sited outdoors. Johanson's Minimalist sculptures introduced the idea of artworks that cannot be experienced all at once, still an important value in her work.

Cyrus Field (1970–71), while still a large Minimalist sculpture, marks a transition. Using marble, cement, and redwood slabs in their natural state, she created a maze of lines that lead visitors through a forest to reveal the changing, natural landscape. With this piece, she began thinking of line as a compositional device to incorporate, rather than displace, nature. She also invented a way to mediate between human scale and the vastness of nature.

== The House and Garden Commission (1969) ==
In 1969, House & Garden (magazine) invited Johanson to design a garden. While this was never built, the commission prompted an outpouring of visionary ideas—150 small sketches—which she continued to draw upon over the years. The drawings, accompanied by essays and explanatory notes, were a departure from traditional garden designs and also a rejection of the formalist orientation of the 1960s art world. Instead of art-for-art's sake, her garden designs embodied meaningfulness and functionality.

Johanson's move from making objects to working with the natural world—first in drawings and later in actual commissions—has parallels as well as differences with the emergence of Earthworks by artists in her circle of friends, such as Robert Smithson and Nancy Holt. The similarity is working large-scale with the land itself. A difference is that many of Johanson's designs were meant to serve practical functions, such as flood control, habitat for local wildlife, and green roofs that absorb rainwater. Johanson also designed for urban, rather than remote locations. Another difference is that most of her designs are dominated by a simple, large image of a plant or animal.

The House and Garden designs mark a reorientation in Johanson's career. She gave up painting and sculpture and focused on designs that are simultaneously art and landscape. To prepare herself for translating project designs into large-scale sculptural landscapes, she began studying civil engineering and architecture at City College School of Architecture, New York, in 1971, receiving her B. Arch. in 1977.

== Plant drawings for projects: 1974–1978 ==
In the 1970s, Johanson began a family and settled in upstate New York, where she lived ever since. She left the vibrant New York art scene for a 19th-century farmhouse on the rural Buskirk property of Eugene Goossen. Her first son, Alvar, was born in 1973 (followed by Gerrit in 1978 and Nathaniel in 1980). Here she was in constant touch with the natural seasons, but childrearing left only snatches of time to work.

Her solution was to make tiny drawings of plants during the day and at night to transform them into designs for large-scale projects. At this time, she also studied botany texts. This was a new process: instead of depending on inspiration, she rendered nature in a straightforward way.

== Water and color garden designs: 1980–1985 ==
In the 1980s, even as Johanson began her first built projects, she created several series of project drawings for gardens and fountains that emphasize water and color in the form of gigantic flowers, butterfly wings or snakes. For example, Tidal Color Gardens (1981–82) increase the visibility of tides, with images of butterfly wings or flowers changing as water flows in and out. The O’Keeffe/Equivalents-Color Garden are drawings for earth sculptures in the form of a butterfly wing with color patterns based on Alfred Stieglitz photographs of O’Keeffe.

== Project commissions: From 1981 ==
=== Fair Park Lagoon, Dallas (1981–1986) ===
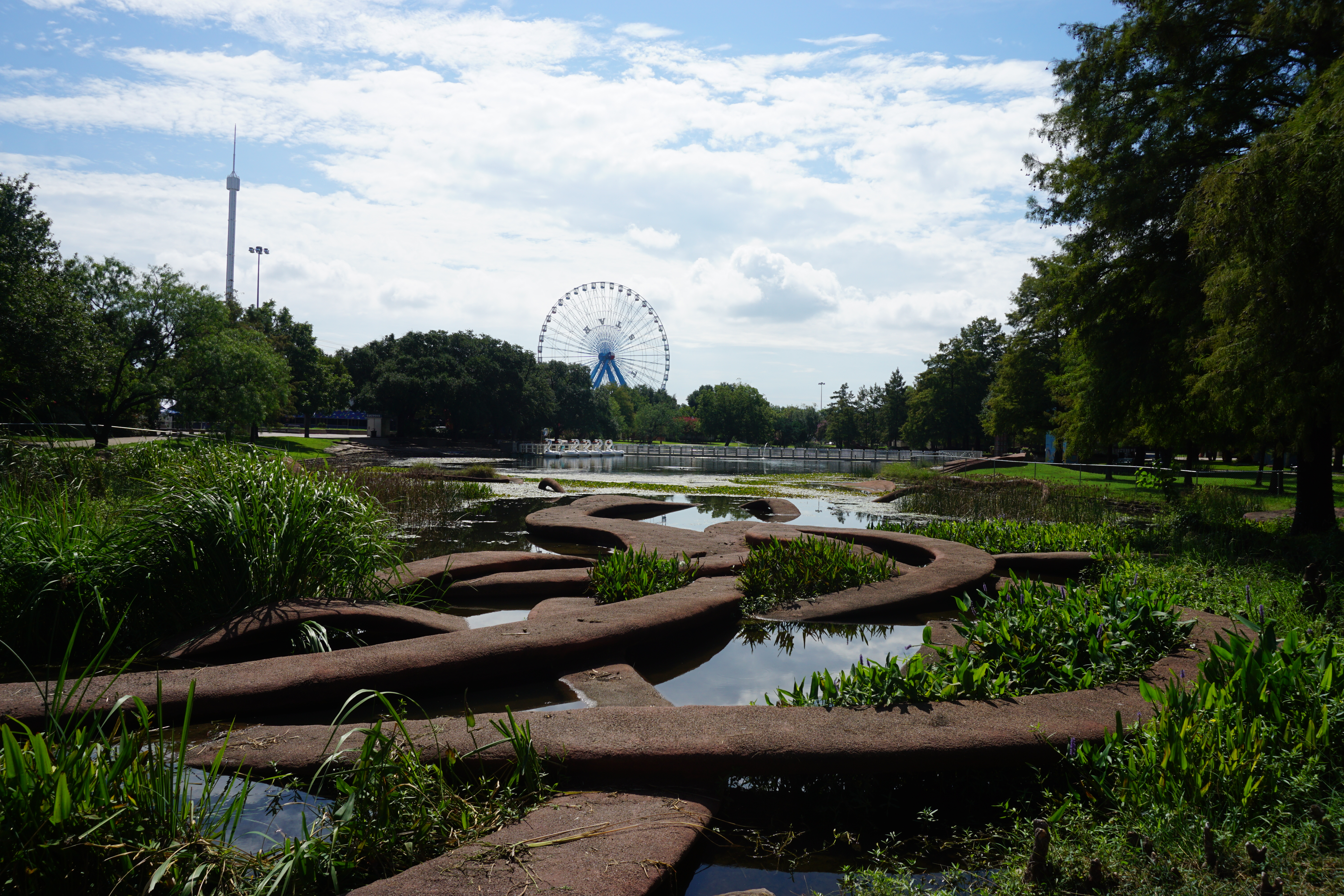
Delta Duck-Potato (Sagittaria platyphylla), Fair Park Lagoon

Johanson's first built project was commissioned in 1981 to restore Fair Park's Leonhardt Lagoon, which was then in a badly degraded state. To solve the problems of an eroded shoreline, murky water and algal bloom, Johanson devised large sculptural forms that broke up wave action and selected indigenous plantings as microhabitats for wildlife. The gigantic, terra cotta–colored gunite sculptures, which doubled as pathways for human visitors and perches for birds and turtles, take the form of a Delta Duck-Potato (Sagittaria platyphylla) and a Spider Brake Fern (Pteris multifida). She mimicked Delta Duck-Potato's root and built five-foot-wide paths on the lagoon where people can walk safely, and the same natural, curvy shapes for sculptures on the shoreline for people to sit on. The Spider Brake Fern sculpture winds across the lagoon with elegant, soft curves that stretch below and above the water, which ends on a crossway surrounded by lilies and irises. Those curves that go above the water provide safe platforms for turtles and other species to rest. Other than those sculptures, vegetation, floating plants, and tall grasses were everywhere. Today Leonhardt Lagoon is a functioning ecosystem in the heart of Dallas, where it also serves as a place of education and recreation. This is one of the earliest examples of art as bioremediation. For this and other large-scale urban projects, she worked with a variety of experts including scientists, engineers, and city planners, as well as with local citizen groups.

The Patricia Johanson Foundation, dedicated to promoting greater public interest in the artist's legacy, public design, ecological art, and multi-functional infrastructure, was established in 2023.

=== Endangered Garden, San Francisco (1987–1997) ===
When San Francisco needed a new pump station and holding tank next to the Bay, Johanson was invited to co-design a facility that would be sensitive to the site. She wanted something aesthetic, but also useful in ways beyond mere sewage treatment, so she designed a series of habitats to nourish threatened species. The roof of the sewer is a one-third-mile-long baywalk having colors and patterns in yellow, black, light blue, and red in organic curves, derive from the endangered San Francisco garter snake. The head of the serpent is a 20-foot-high (6.1 m) mound that serves as a microhabitat for butterflies. The Ribbon Worm Tidal Steps is a purple ribbon worm that zigzags and surrounds the rocks near the tides, fill with water at high tide, creating homes for small marine life.

=== Park for the Amazon Rainforest, Obidos, Brazil (1992) ===
In 1992, the Brazilian government invited Johanson to attend the Earth Summit and to create a project for a park in the Amazon rainforest. Her model for this shows a 150-foot-high (46 m) ramp, in the form of a Brazilian aerial plant, that allows visitors to experience a range of microhabitats at various levels. The ramp itself is intended to become encrusted by tropical vegetation. This project has been disrupted several times by changes in government and is currently on hold.

=== The Rocky Marciano Trail, Brockton, Massachusetts (1997–1999) ===
This project, which art critic Lucy Lippard calls a favorite, began as an effort to stimulate Brockton's economy. Johanson developed a master plan to connect disparate neighborhoods and districts and to restore ecological functioning. Since Rocky Marciano is a Brockton celebrity, she planned to use his training routes as a way to connect neighborhoods and nature. The Rocky Marciano Trail begins at the Marciano home and leads visitors to various “magnet sites,’‘ such as Thomas McNulty Park and Battery Wagner, both enhanced by Johanson’s cultural and environmental designs. She also planned to daylight the many buried or disrupted streams throughout the town and to revive forest corridors to create a continuous public landscape. This project was rejected by the city of Brockton.

=== Millenium Park Landfill Site, Seoul, Korea (1999) ===
In 1999, Johanson was part of an international team of experts asked to propose sustainable solutions for Seoul’s main dumpsite, which closed in 1990. To reclaim the site her idea was to transform it into a park and to restore ecological communities. As a unifying image, she chose the haetae, a mythical animal that wards off evil. She borrowed decorative patterns of haetae sculptures to create designs for terraces, microhabitats, and pedestrian and vehicle access to the summits.

=== Petaluma Wetlands Park and Ellis Creek Water Recycling Facility, Petaluma, California (2001–2009) ===
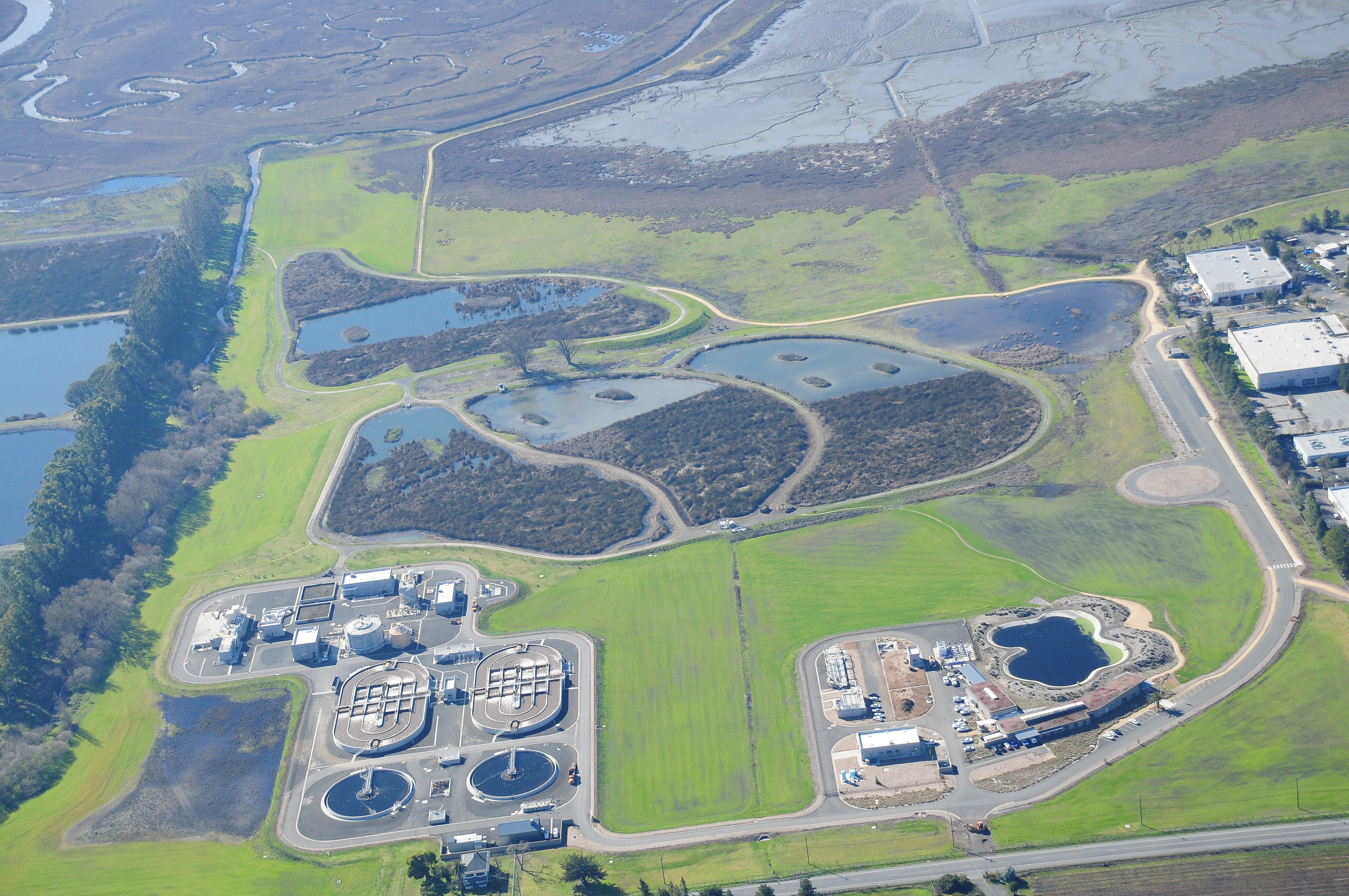
Aerial view of the Ellis Creek Water Treatment Facility in Petaluma, CA completed in January 2009

Working as a member of the Carollo Engineers design team, Johanson helped create a new water treatment facility. By overlaying art, public access, sewage treatment, habitat restorations, and agriculture, she embedded major urban infrastructure within living nature. Her design has been credited with "re-inventing art and reforming civil engineering". The project includes natural systems to treat sewage, allowing millions of gallons of water to be reused. Johanson used the form of the endangered Salt Marsh Harvest Mouse to create the shapes of the polishing ponds, which contain islands that direct the flow of water and provide nesting habitat for birds. Other plantings support local wildlife. An additional 230-acre (0.93 km^{2}) area of tidal wetlands was acquired for the park and wildlife sanctuary. This multi-purpose landscape provides more than 3 miles (4.8 km) of walking trails for educational programs, nature study and tourism. Petaluma Wetlands Park coincides with a $150 million sewage treatment facility, while also serving as a highly visible model for converting sewage into recycled water, which is stored in a deep reservoir at the end of the "mouse's tail".

=== The Draw at Sugar House, Salt Lake City, Utah (2003–2018) ===
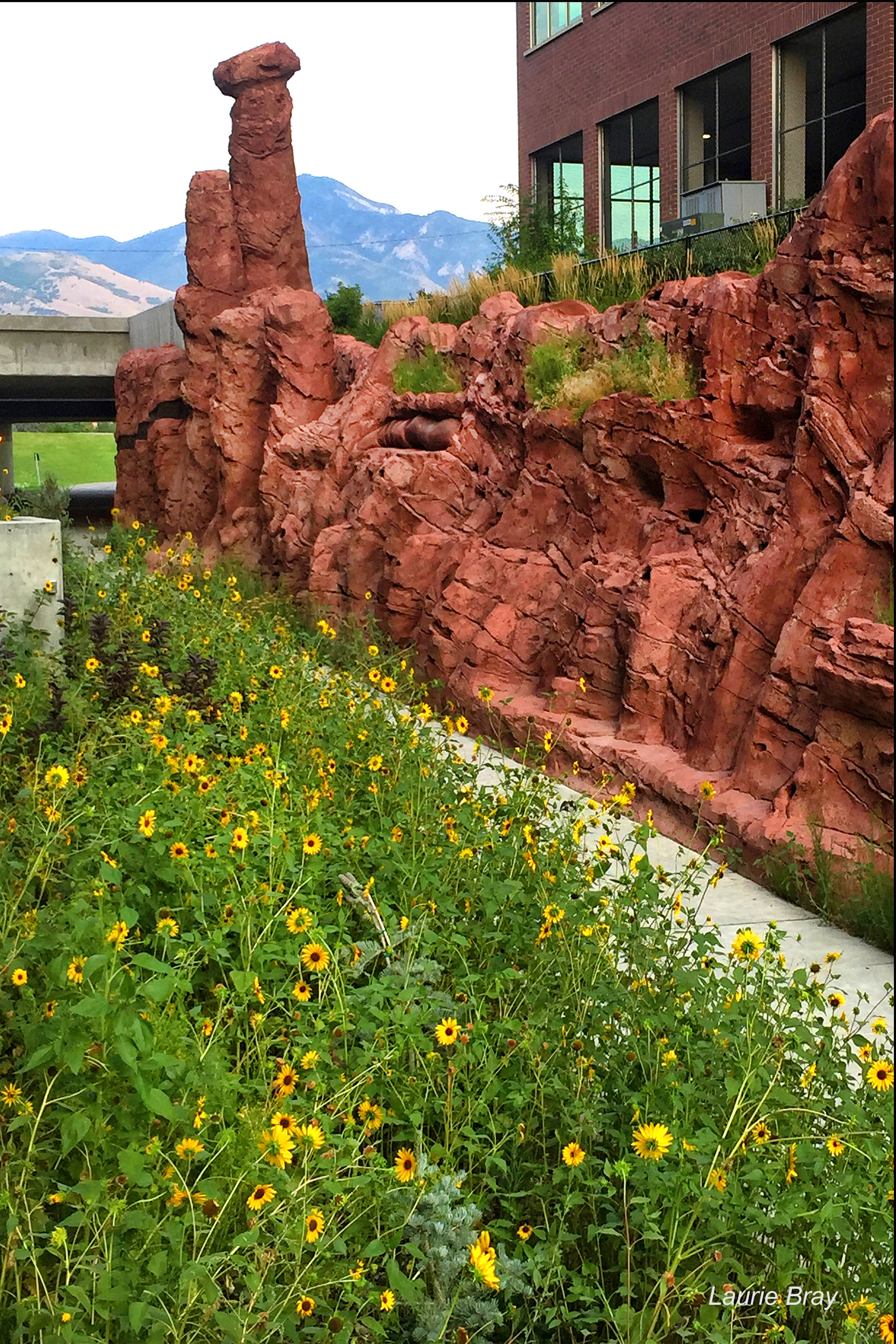
The Draw at Sugar House with Sunflowers

The Salt Lake nonprofit, Parley's Rails, Trails and Tunnels Coalition commissioned Johanson to create safe passage under a major expressway and connect two sections of the planned eight-mile (13 km) Parley's Trail. The design encompasses two gigantic sculptures based on the native Sego Lily (Calochortus nuttallii) and an historic canyon, which are respectively located east and west of the expressway and connected by an underpass. As practical infrastructure, the Sego Lily serves as a diversion dam, while the canyon functions as flood wall, spillway, and provides wildlife habitat. Simultaneously, the sculptures serve as climbing walls, overlooks, a trail and plaza. The underpass mimics a Utah canyon, with embedded coal seams and fossil formations. The design is multilayered to offer visitors opportunities to connect in a variety of ways with references to local ecology, geology, and specific sculptural formations to recall the Mormon journey through Echo Canyon.

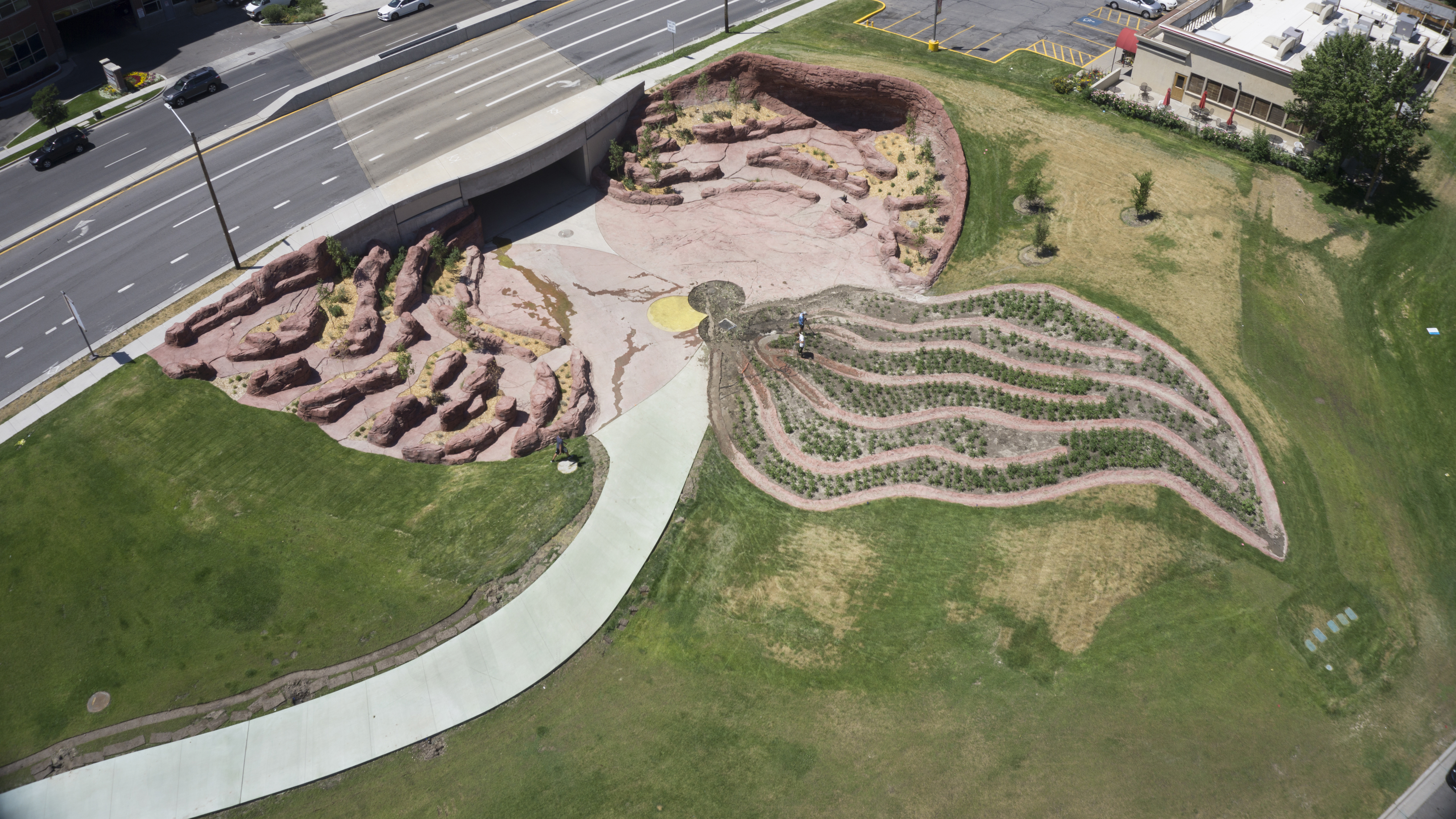
Aerial photo of the Sego Lily diversion dam at the Draw at Sugarhouse, Salt Lake City, Utah.

Like other projects designed by Johanson, The Draw at Sugar House is a multilayered creation. It is simultaneously large-scale gunite sculpture, habitat for native flora and fauna, a compendium of references to Utah's cultural and natural history, and an element of Salt Lake City's flood control system. The project is notable not only for its conceptual complexity, but also for the structural complexity which necessitated a sophisticated engineering design using I-beams and reinforced concrete.

The Draw began in 2003 as an award-winning design for a safe bicycle and pedestrian passage under a busy seven-lane highway. The underpass also connects two sections of Parley's Creek Trail in Sugar House Park and the Hidden Hollow natural area. The original design evolved over the next 15 years in significant ways, notably in the augmentation of its flood-control functions and the elimination of two significant features of the original plan.

The final artwork consists of three contiguous sections: the Sego Lily plaza and walkway, the underpass, and the Echo Canyon “living wall”. It can be entered and explored either from Sugar House Park on the east or from the Hidden Hollow natural area on the west.

The Sego Lily Plaza serves a variety of functions and contains a multiplicity of meanings. Utah's state flower, the sego lily, is the basis for the design of this section of The Draw situated at the west side of Sugar House Park. The shapes of the flower form an amphitheater with the stem creating a pathway extending to a bulb-shaped overlook above Parley's Creek, which at that point flows beneath the highway to emerge five blocks away in Hidden Hollow.

The three petals of the lily are layered with sculpted, rock-like forms creating little terraces for native plants and for visitor seating. In times of flooding, the bowl-shaped amphitheater serves as a basin that calms and direct water through the underpass and down the sculpted spillway “canyon.”

The petal on the north side rises 30 feet to create an overlook, while the east petal is striated with irrigation channels and food crops. The south petal contains winding pathways up to the highway.

Entering the underpass from Sego Lily Plaza, the visitor encounters references to Utah's subterranean geology—a slice of rocky strata with a prominent coal seam and small details such as fossils and roots to be discovered.

To the west of the tunnel lies a sculpted floodwall which helps lead water overflow to Parley's Creek. The shapes of the wall reference natural landmarks and forms of Utah's historic Echo Canyon, which helped guide Mormon pioneers to their new land. This miniature Echo Canyon is not only part of the flood-control system and a historical reference, but also a vertical garden with nesting places, water cachement basins, and ledges that provide habitat for native animals and plants.

=== Mary’s Garden, Marywood University, Scranton, Pennsylvania (2008-2024) ===
Mary’s Garden is designed to remediate a coal mining site which was purchased by the Sisters, Servants of the Immaculate Heart of Mary, in 1969. The garden incorporates elements that purify water and provide wildlife habitat while also referencing the cultural, geological and natural history of the place. Two large sculptural formations, Madonna Lily and Mary’s Rose, based on traditional religious symbols, shape the two main areas of the five-acre site. Remnants of mining activity and forms made of local stratified rock reference the previous industrial uses of the land, and geological eras. Seating and pathways offer opportunities for relaxation and contemplation of plants and wildlife at close range.

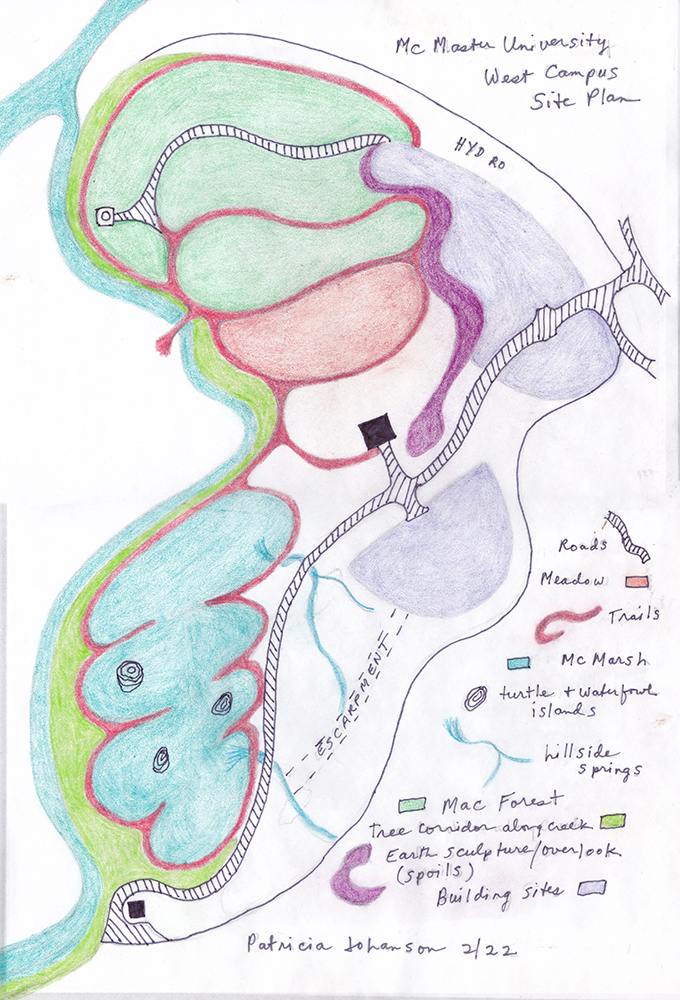
McMaster Preliminary site plan

=== McMarsh and West Campus, McMaster University (2018-present) ===
Currently in progress, this 45-acre project for McMaster University in Hamilton, Ontario, Canada will be simultaneously a work of Land Art, a wetland habitat restoration, and a living laboratory for students and researchers. The overall plan is based loosely on a Monarch butterfly wing, paying homage to this endangered species, which begins its 3,000-mile migration to Mexico in this part of Ontario. The wing-shape is defined by landscaped terraces, plantings, and Coldwater Creek, which runs along the western perimeter. The upper and lower halves of the wing will contain the two main habitat areas. Within these habitats, a series of unpaved pathways, inspired by the veins of the Monarch's wings, will allow visitors to experience the various ecologies up close.

Johanson's design constitutes a major part of the university's master plan for its West Campus sustainability initiative. The plan will reestablish three distinct wetland habitats—wet forest, ponds, and marshland—located within the upper (northern) and lower (southern) sections of the Monarch wing profile.

In the upper section, several types of woodlands will be added to the existing McMaster Forest to create a cooler, more sustainable environment. Within the forest, a separate food forest will contain the kinds of edible plants traditionally used by the Mississauga Nation and Haudenosaunee Confederacy. Adjacent to the Forest will be two meadows containing milkweed plants to feed Monarch butterfly caterpillars.

In the southern portion, McMarsh, the current parking lot will be excavated down to the former floodplain level and be replaced by four interconnected ponds. Here, native plants will help purify the water and provide food as well as shelter for returning birds, waterfowl, amphibians, and turtles. Pathways surrounding and jutting out into the ponds will allow visitors to study wildlife up close while a deep, central channel will give researchers canoe and kayak access.

The fill excavated for the ponds will be used to shape the topography of the site in various ways. Some of the fill will be sculpted into configurations inspired by local geology, such as the Niagara Escarpment. Some will be shaped to direct stormwater or to channel airflow. Some will form “tablelands” capable of supporting a research facility for the study of the renewed habitats as they evolve over time.

== Personal life and death ==
Johanson married art critic and historian Eugene Goossen in 1974. She had three sons: Gerrit, Alvar, and Nathaniel, and three grandchildren. Goossen died in 1997.

Johanson died from heart failure on October 16, 2024, at the age of 84.

== Reception ==
According to art curator Lucy Lippard, "Of all the artists (so many of them women) who have become known over the last few decades for large-scale public art in/with nature—what is now called ‘eco-art’—Johanson stands out as a seldom-acknowledged pioneer. Her writings of the late 1960s, when she was still in her twenties, are a cornucopia of possibilities for environmental art and planning that are still being ‘discovered’ today." Curator Barbara Matilsky has stated "Patricia Johanson was one of the first artists to think of art as a means to restore habitats and her work is an outstanding model for maintaining biodiversity. By creating art that revitalizes natural ecosystems and introduces them to urban dwellers, she has become an innovator in art, ecology, and urban renewal."

== Public collections with works by Patricia Johanson ==
- Allen Memorial Art Museum, Oberlin College, Oberlin, Ohio
- Art Institute of Chicago
- Dallas Museum of Art, Dallas
- Metropolitan Museum of Art, New York
- Museum of Modern Art, New York
- National Museum of Women in the Arts, Washington, D. C.
- Storm King Art Center, Mountainville, New York

== Selected exhibitions ==
Johanson's work has been showcased in over 150 exhibitions, and her models are included in the permanent collections of both the Metropolitan Museum of Art and the Museum of Modern Art in New York.

- 1964 - "8 Young Artists," Hudson River Museum, Yonkers and Bennington College, Vermont, catalog
- 1966 - "Distillation," Stable Gallery and Tibor de Nagy Gallery, New York
- 1967 - "Patricia Johanson: Paintings," Tibor de Nagy Gallery, New York
- 1968 - "The Art of the Real," Museum of Modern Art, New York; Grand Palais, Paris; Kunsthaus, Zurich; and Tate Gallery, London, catalogs
- 1973 - "Patricia Johanson: A Selected Retrospective, 1959-1973," Bennington College, Vermont, catalog
- 1973 - "Art in Space," Detroit Institute of Arts, catalog
- 1974 - "Patricia Johanson: Some Approaches to Landscape, Architecture, and the City," Montclair State College, New Jersey, catalog
- 1974 - "Interventions in Landscape," M.I.T., Cambridge, Massachusetts
- 1977 - "The City Project: Outdoor Environmental Art," New Gallery of Contemporary Art, Cleveland and Cleveland State University
- 1977 - "Women in American Architecture," Brooklyn Museum, New York, book
- 1978 - "Celebration of Water," Cooper-Hewitt Museum, Smithsonian Institution, New York
- 1978 - "Patricia Johanson: Plant Drawings for Projects," Rosa Esman Gallery, New York, catalog
- 1979 - "Mind, Child, Architecture," Newark Museum, New Jersey
- 1979 - "Patricia Johanson: Drawings for the Camouflage House and Orchid Projects," Rosa Esman Gallery, New York, catalog
- 1980 - "American Drawings in Black and White," Brooklyn Museum, New York
- 1981 - "Artist’s Parks and Gardens," Museum of Contemporary Art, Chicago
- 1981 - "Patricia Johanson: Landscapes, 1969-1980," Rosa Esman Gallery, New York, catalog
- 1982 - "Landshapes: A Living Lagoon," Dallas Museum of Natural History, catalog
- 1982 - "Patricia Johanson: A Project for the Fair Park Lagoon," Dallas Museum of Fine Arts
- 1983 - "Beyond the Monument," M.I.T. and Harvard Graduate School of Design, Cambridge, Massachusetts, catalog
- 1983 - "Patricia Johanson: Fair Park Lagoon, Dallas and Color-Gardens," Rosa Esman Gallery, New York, catalog
- 1984 - "Patricia Johanson: Designs for Parks and Gardens," Philippe Bonnafont Gallery, San Francisco
- 1985 - "The Maximal Implications of the Minimal Line," Bard College, Annandale-on-Hudson, New York, catalog
- 1986 - "Awards Exhibition," American Academy and Institute of Arts and Letters, New York, catalog
- 1986 - "Sculpture for Public Spaces," Marisa del Re Gallery, New York, catalog
- 1987 - "Patricia Johanson: Drawings and Models for Environmental Projects, 1969-1986," Berkshire Museum, Pittsfield, Massachusetts, catalog
- 1987 - "Patricia Johanson: Interpretive Drawings for Architecture and Landscape," Twining Gallery, New York, catalog
- 1991 - "Eco Art: Imaging a New Paradigm," San Jose State University, California, catalog
- 1991 - "Patricia Johanson, A Retrospective, 1960-1991," Usdan Gallery, Bennington College, Vermont
- 1991 - "Patricia Johanson: Public Landscapes," Painted Bride Art Center, Philadelphia, catalog
- 1992 - "Projeto Omame," Movimento Artistas Pela Natureza, Athos Bulcão Art Gallery, National Theater, Brasilia, Brazil
- 1992 - "Fragile Ecologies: Artists Interpretations and Solutions," Queens Museum, Flushing, New York, book
- 1993 - "Differentes Natures," La Defense Art Galleries, Paris and La Virreina, Barcelona, catalog
- 1993 - "Tres Cantos da Terra," National Museum of Fine Arts, Rio de Janeiro, Brazil, catalog
- 1994 - "Cosmic-Maternal: Lia do Rio, Patricia Johanson, Mariyo Yagi," Gallery Nikko, Tokyo, catalog
- 1994 - "Creative Solutions to Ecological Issues," Laumeier Sculpture Park, St. Louis and Longwood Fine Art Center, Virginia, catalog
- 2000 - "Un Jardin à Manhattan," l’Institut Français d’Architecture, Paris
- 2000 - "French Embassy Garden Competition," Ambassade de France, Cultural Services Gallery, New York
- 2000 - "Jardin 2000: La Ville/Le Jardin/La Memoire," Accademia di Francia, Villa Medici, Rome, catalog
- 2001 - "Patricia Johanson: An Artist’s Vision for Community," Salina Art Center, Kansas
- 2002 - "Ecovention: Current Art to Transform Ecologies," Contemporary Arts Center, Cincinnati, book
- 2004 - "A Minimal Future? Art as Object: 1958-1968," Museum of Contemporary Art, Los Angeles, book
- 2007 - "Weather Report: Art and Climate Change," Boulder Museum of Contemporary Art, Colorado, catalog
- 2009 - "Art and Infrastructure: Patricia Johanson and the Petaluma Wetlands Park," Nevada Museum of Art, Reno
- 2010 - "Elemental: Earth, Air, Fire, Water," Santa Fe Art Institute, New Mexico
- 2012 - "Green Acres: Artists Farming Fields, Greenhouses and Abandoned Lots," Contemporary Arts Center, Cincinnati, book
- 2012 - "Ends of the Earth: Land Art to 1974," Museum of Contemporary Art, Los Angeles and Haus der Kunst, Munich
- 2013 - "My Brain Is in My Inkstand: Drawing as Thinking and Process," Cranbrook Art Museum, Bloomfield Hills, Michigan, catalog
- 2013 - "Patricia Johanson: The World as a Work of Art," Museum Het Domein, Sittard, The Netherlands
- 2014 - "Beyond Earth Art," Herbert F. Johnson Museum of Art, Cornell University, Ithaca, New York
- 2015 - "Patricia Johanson’s Environmental Remedies: Connecting Soil to Water," Millersville University, Millersville, Pennsylvania, catalog and book
- 2017 - "Hybris," MUSAC, Museo de Arte Contemporáneo de Castilla y León, Spain, catalog
- 2018 - "Shifting Ground," Johnson Museum of Art, Cornell University, book
- 2018 - "Virginia Woolf: An Exhibition Inspired by Her Writings," Tate St. Ives; Pallant House, Chichester; and Fitzwilliam Museum, Cambridge University, UK
- 2020 - "Patricia Johanson: House & Garden," Usdan Gallery, Bennington College, Bennington, Vermont, catalog
- 2022 - "Visual Natures: The Politics and Culture of Environmentalism in the 20th and 21st Centuries," MAAT, Museum of Art, Architecture and Technology, Lisbon, Portugal
- 2023 - "Groundswell: Women of Land Art," Nasher Sculpture Center, Dallas, Texas

== Awards ==
- Guggenheim Fellowship, 1970
- Artist's Fellowship, National Endowment for the Arts, 1975
- International Women's Year Award, 1976
- Townsend Harris Medal, City College of New York, 1994
- D.F.A. (honorary), Massachusetts College of Art, Boston, 1995

== Side Note ==
This information was researched and written by Patricia Sanders Ph.D. I have simply been her computer helper.
