= Kim Kirkpatrick =

Kim Kirkpatrick (born 1952) is a landscape photographer who lives and works in the Washington, D.C. area. He created a large body of work during the 1980s and 1990s that extensively used the photo effect, bokeh.

Kirkpatrick earned a Bachelor of Fine Arts from the Corcoran College of Art and Design and a Master of Fine Arts from the University of Maryland. In 1993, the Aaron Siskind Foundation awarded Kirkpatrick an Individual Photographers Fellowship Grant. Kirkpatrick taught photography as an adjunct member of the faculty at the Corcoran College of Art and Design and at the Smithsonian Residents Associate Program. He has exhibited his photography in galleries and museums. The musical group Interface used a Kirkpatrick photograph on the cover of their CD "./swank."

Kirkpatrick's landscape photos focus on construction and industrial zones around Washington D.C. He uses an 8×10 view camera for its high-resolution image, adding, "I want the detail that people miss." Sally Troyer, a D.C. gallery owner, said of Kirkpatrick's work, "I have never seen work so sensitive to light and color." Mike Johnston noted, in reference to bokeh, that Kirkpatrick "made deft use of it as design, as figuration, and as a way to use color abstractly".
