= Sabrina Raaf =

Sabrina Raaf is an American, Chicago-based, mechanized sculpture artist, and photographer.

== Career ==
Sabrina Raaf attended Georgetown University in Washington, D.C. receiving her Bachelors in the School of Foreign Service. After graduating in 1994, she attended Corcoran College of Art and Design in Washington D.C.(absorbed by Georgetown University). At Corcoran she befriended David Adamson while attending his computer-art class, and in 1995, Raaf became gallery intern at the David Adamson Gallery. As a photographer and aspiring curator, Raaf organized a show of women photographers including herself.

To pursue her master's degree, Raaf moved to Chicago, Illinois attending the School of the Art Institute of Chicago with a focus area on Art and Technology. In 1998, Raaf along with nine other Chicago-based artists formed a group formerly known as "synApse" to further discuss the paths and issues of art and technology. Topics included the relationship between technological advancement and the human role within the world, as well as predetermined technological obsolescence and the acceleration of consumerism. They collectively considered themselves “machine-assisted artists producing artworks that are art-producing machines.”

In 1999, Raaf received her MFA. She has been a guest lecturer, presenter, panelist, visiting artist, and curator. From 2001 to 2005, Raaf was a professor for the photography department at Columbia College in Chicago. From 2005 to present, she has been an associate professor in New Media Art for the School of Art and Art History at the University of Illinois at Chicago.

== Exhibitions ==
Grower, 2004 by Sabrina Raaf

"Grower is a small 'rover' vehicle which navigates around the periphery of a room. It hugs the room’s walls and responds to the carbon dioxide levels in the air by actually drawing varying heights of 'grass' on the walls in green ink. The Grower robot senses the carbon dioxide (CO2) level in the air via a small digital CO2 sensor. This sensor is mounted high on a wall of the exhibition space and sends data wirelessly to the robot. The number of people in an exhibit space breathing in oxygen and exhaling CO2 has an immediate effect on the sensor. My robot takes a reading of the CO2 level every few seconds and in response it draws a vertical line in green ink on the wall".

"My machine’s grass growing is a dynamic, emergent behavior in which humans participate involuntarily. This behavior allows the Grower to ‘nest’ the space – meaning, make the space into one where you find evidence of natural, organic change. The drawings of grass may not be organic in a strict sense, but they may be read cognitively the way we read plants or gardens outside. Is the grass thriving? Has there been much activity? Watching the artistic output of a machine that is so sensitive to its environment makes the people in the space more sensitive their environment and its conditions. The grower also provides a memory, through its drawings, of those conditions."

In 2019 Grower was exhibited at the Chicago New Media 1973-1992 Exhibition in Gallery 400.

== Awards ==
2006 Individual Artist Award Nominee, The Richard H. Dreihaus Foundation, Chicago
2005 International Art Award from Bridge Magazine
2005 Individual Artist Award Nominee, The Richard H. Dreihaus Foundation, Chicago
2005 Illinois Art Council Fellowship Grant (Interdisciplinary Art)
2005 Faculty Development Grant, Columbia College
2004 Individual Artist Award Nominee, The Richard H. Dreihaus Foundation, Chicago
2004 International Digital Art Award (IDAA)
2002 Creative Capital Grant in Emerging Fields
2002 Faculty Development Grant, Columbia College
2001 Illinois Art Council Fellowship Grant
2001 CAAP Grant, Chicago Cultural Center, Chicago, IL
1997 Saltonstall Foundation for the Arts Grant, Ithaca, NY
1996 Cornell Council for the Arts Grant, Ithaca, NY
