= Eugene Goossen =

American art critic and historian

Eugene C. Goossen (August 6, 1920 – July 14, 1997) was an American art critic and art historian who organized more than 60 art exhibitions, wrote essays for catalogues in addition to books on the subject. He was on the faculty of Hunter College, where he headed the art department.

Goossen was born in 1920 in Gloversville, New York. He attended Hamilton College, the Corcoran School of Fine Arts, the Sorbonne and earned his undergraduate degree at the New School for Social Research, where he earned a bachelor's degree. He was the art and theater critic for The Monterey Peninsula and Herald. He moved to Bennington College in 1958, where he also served as director of exhibitions. He was hired by Hunter College in 1961 and also taught at the CUNY Graduate Center.

Goossen was responsible for organizing dozens of art exhibitions at galleries and museums around the United States. He oversaw a 1969 retrospective of works by Helen Frankenthaler at the Whitney Museum of American Art and those by Ellsworth Kelly in an exhibition at the Museum of Modern Art. In addition to essays in catalogues, Goossen's wrote several art books, including The Art of the Real, Stuart Davis and Ellsworth Kelly. In a review of the 1968 exhibition Art of the Real he organized as guest director at the Museum of Modern Art, John Canaday of The New York Times said that Goossen's essay about the exhibit was "probably the clearest definition yet of the goals and justification of a school of art that is usually written about with maximum pretentiousness". Goossen saw works by the abstract painter Doug Ohlson as depicting "yellowish pink and green dawns, blue noons, and red-orange sunsets that swiftly slide from purple to black".

The New York Times called Goossen "the leading expert" on the work of the visual sculptor Tony Smith. Goossen called Smith "the most important sculptor to appear in the second half of the 20th century" whose importance was not fully appreciated at the time but would be as the years passed. He was recognized as a Guggenheim Fellow in 1971 and was the recipient of the Critics' Award in 1975 from the National Endowment for the Arts.

A resident of Buskirk, New York, Goossen died at age 76 on July 14, 1997, at Southwestern Vermont Medical Center in Bennington, Vermont. The cause of death was pneumonia, which he suffered after a long illness. He was survived by his wife, Patricia Johanson, an environmental sculptor best known for her large-scale art projects that create habitats for humans, as well as by two children from his first marriage and three sons from his second.
