= Art in Embassies Program =

Program of the US Department of State

Art in Embassies, a program of the US Department of State, promotes cultural diplomacy through exhibitions, permanent collections, site-specific commissions and two-way artist exchanges in more than 200 US embassies and consulates around the world. Through art, international audiences gain a sense of the quality, scope, and diversity of American and host country art and culture. The program was initiated by President John F. Kennedy in 1963.

== Exhibition planning ==
The amount of money allotted for art in each building is calculated with a formula based on the gross square footage. AIEP's curatorial team develops thematic exhibitions in collaboration with each ambassador, taking into account the host country's artistic traditions and cultural mores. They recommend artists and works of art, negotiate all loans, and propose placement of the art within the embassy residences. After all loans are secured and the art insured, AIE's registrars coordinate with professional art handlers for the assembly, packing, crating and safe shipment of each exhibition to post. Since 1963, approximately 10,000 pieces of art have been placed in ambassador residences, embassies, and consulates throughout the world, including work by Maya Lin, Jeff Koons, Ellsworth Kelly, Martin Puryear, Louise Bourgeois, Joel Shapiro, Benjamin Abramowitz, Elliott Thompson, and other prestigious artists. The total value of art on loan to the embassy program is estimated at $200 million.

== Artist exchanges and residency programs ==
Initiated in 2002, the American Artists Abroad program was created to extend Art In Embassies' exhibitions beyond the walls of US diplomatic residences into local communities. Participating American artists travel to countries where their work is exhibited and engage in a series of public cultural programming activities, such as lectures, workshops, and studio visits.
