= Rebecca Rice =

American actress

Rebecca Rice (1947–2002) was a performer, teacher, playwright, anti-racism/anti-oppression activist, and community-based artist. For over 30 years, she created theatre that impacted directly on the lives of people who are often overlooked by mainstream theatre.

== Biography ==
Born in Tyler, Texas and relocated to Chicago at a young age with her parents and sister, it was through drama classes with Johnny Houston, a dedicated Chicago Park District employee who ran after-school and summertime recreation programs for children that Rice first realized she had a gift for singing, dancing and theater.

After Malcolm X and Martin Luther King Jr. were both assassinated, like many who came of age in the 1960s she felt called to take action to right wrongs and redress social inequalities. Rice soon discovered the theater could not only be for entertainment, but to critically engage, uplift, memorialize and celebrate the lives of marginalized poor and working-class people. She traveled to New York City for a bit but landed in Washington, DC joined the Black Panther Party and began teaching at RAP, Inc. (a center for ex-addicts in the District). In 1970, she saw an ad for auditions for the Living Stage Theatre Company, the newly established community "outreach" and educational theatre arm of Arena Stage. Under the direction of Robert Alexander (1929–2008), Living Stage was emerging as one of the first multi-racial, improvisational theatre companies dedicated to art for social change in the nation. For 14 years (1970–1984), Rice was a lead actress and associate director at Living Stage. There she authored over 50 theatre works for audiences of all ages and abilities, and conducted thousands of workshop for children, youth and adults from the DC area including work in prisons, substance abuse rehabilitation facilities, shelters for the homeless and schools.

In 1971, Rice published an article in off our backs, one of the earliest second-wave feminist publications to come out of the nation's capital, in which she reflects upon the transformative power of performance:

"I stand before the mirror and examine this face, my face. I know this face, I know the eyes, the nose, the mouth, the skin, the bones. Unique only in that they are together to make this face. I know this face, yes, but do I know its limitations? No. How many faces will I make today? What roles will this face portray? A black militant, a bigot, prostitute, infant, gorilla, guerilla, an Indian, an angel, a grandmother or a paper doll. It could be one or all, all and more. Take this face, add this body and there is within them the possibility to experience every emotion ever felt, all the actions and reactions that have ever occurred since the dawn of man. I have only to open my being to all of these possibilities."

In the article, Rice also offers this description of the work of Living Stage and the practice of theatre for social change:

What is my task? I might be standing before an audience of ex-drug addicts or a group of jittery five-year-olds from a public school, teenage runaways, inmates of a prison or jail or a group of joyous children from a local free-school. My task is to reach them and uplift them. To provide an atmosphere where transformation and transportation can take place. Where I can reveal myself artistically, thereby enabling the audience to do the same. To discover for myself and to allow others to discover. This transformation is the most important thing. For it is during transformation that a person experiences her own creativity and is able to perceive the world through experiences other than her own; she is able to broaden her knowledge of a very specific situation and then transport that new knowledge to many other situations. A child may become a slave and then a dog and then a child again, and is able to perceive the connection between them all.

For her contributions to the DC community, Rice was awarded the Toast and Strawberries Community Service Award in Washington, DC.

In 1985, Rice left Living Stage to pursue her work as an independent artist working in communities across the country, as well as in Europe and Latin America. Eventually she settled in Minneapolis–Saint Paul where she began a long association with the famed Penumbra Theatre Company. There she appeared in leading roles in The Piano Lesson, Fences, Two Trains Running, Willie and Ester and Jar the Floor. The collaboration with Penumbra's Artistic Director, Lou Bellamy, led to an invitation to become a member of the ensemble. In 1993–94, she wrote and directed the season opener, Waiting in Vain, an evening-length play based on a newspaper article of a young African American girl's death and exploring the issues of the working poor and returning veterans. In 1995, Everlasting Arms, a performance piece focusing on street violence and its effect upon mother–son relationships, became the company's season closer. Rice starred in the latter with Omari Shakir (aka Gavin Lawrence) and the show was directed by Laurie Carlos.

While in Minneapolis, in 1987, Rice joined the nation's first multi-racial professional women's theater ensemble, At the Foot of the Mountain Women's Theatre Company, where she collaborated in the creation of Story of a Mother and premiered This is the House (written and performed with Janet Stanford). She went on to become Artistic Director of that theater and conducted a yearlong training program in Theater for Social Change that produced the original drama Allegiance, which addressed the issue of racism and its roots in American culture.

After taking intensive classes with the Washington School of the Institute for Policy Studies, and Margo-Okasawa-Rey, founder of The Anti-Racism/Anti-Oppression Education Network, as well as the People's Institute for Survival and Beyond in New Orleans, LA, during the 1990s she became a much sought-after anti-racism/anti-oppression program facilitator. Drawing upon her deep experience as a performance maker, she staged educational, participatory civics workshops to aide businesses, schools and community organizations struggling against systemic racism to address "diversity issues".

Rice returned to the nation's capital and operated the All Nation's Studio, a performance space devoted to cross-cultural artwork from the basement of her home in Northeast DC. In that space she nurtured the Saturday Girls, Medusa Speaks: An Artists' Collective, Sol y Soul and many, many more arts organizations dedicated to progressive social change from the ground up. She became a lecturer on Theatre for Social Change at Catholic University and was appointed an Artistic Associate at Center Stage in Baltimore, MD, in 1998. With poet/playwright Kumani (Denise) Gantt (former Director of Education.) She met and worked with Malika Saada-Saar (who is now the Executive Director of The Rebecca Project for Human Rights) at Saada-Saar's Crossing the River program, a ritual-based arts and healing process for women in recovery from drug and alcohol addiction, and later, reestablished ties with Arena Stage as a performer, director and teaching artist.

At Arena, she served as understudy for Trinidad Sisters, The Visit;and appeared as Kassandra in Agamemnon and His Daughters, directed by Molly Smith. In 1999, Rice became an Artistic Associate at Arena Stage/Living Stage, where, with support from the Theatre Communications Group/Pew Charitable Trust Fellowship. As Artistic Associate, she collaborated with Oran Sandel, then Artistic Director of Living Stage, to re-energize the ensemble's practice of arts-based community engagement and to direct, Oceans, an original movement/theatre piece about the turn of the millennium in the age of Bush conservativism. As Artistic Associate for Arena, she also devised and directed The Southwest Project, an artistic collaboration to foster civic engagement amongst residents of the Southwest quadrant of the city. In the 1950s, city planners in DC had advocated for the mass removal of the low-income Black residents of the Southwest quadrant. They circulated rumors that flies from the outhouses of SW had penetrated the dining halls of the Capital and were spreading disease along the hallowed, white halls, of the nation. Their efforts led to the mass removal of thousands of SW residents, followed by a structured burn that leveled hundreds of local businesses and homes to the ground. In the wake of the destruction, a handful of low-income housing projects surrounded by high-rise condos and Arena Stage (founded by Zelda Fichlander) rose from the ashes, but the loss of what had been a thriving community was never truly acknowledged or mourned. The Southwest Project provided a creative opportunity for community residents—past and present—to come together to remember the loss and try to lay ties for the future.

Her final completed play was an adaptation of the South African folktale. Abiyoyo: Now and Then, for young children, Abiyoyo premiered at the Imagination Stage in Bethesda, MD in February 2001.

In her lifetime, Rice was honored with the 1993 Helen Hayes Awards for Outstanding Lead Actress in a Musical, for her work in dancer-choreographer Dianne McIntrye's In Living Color: A Gullah Story at Theatre of the First Amendment; the Ruby Dee Award for her solo Lifeline/I Might Have Been Queen; and the Minnesota/St. Paul Critics Recognition for Best Actress.

In 2002, after a short illness, she succumbed to an infection brought on by cancer surgery, surrounded by a host of friends and family members. Longtime colleagues Janet Stanford and Jennifer L. Nelson penned this remembrance for American Theater Magazine

Rebecca challenged her colleagues to risk living their art, to expose it to the light of day and make deep and personal contact with the audience. Her joy in works of the imagination was contagious and inspired her students to leap into unknown territory searching for their own artistic voices… Rebecca was a woman people wanted to have bless their babies, artistic ones and real ones alike.

A documentary, entitled Walk With Me, features her creative contributions.

== Selected writings ==
- Barton, Peter. Staying Power: Performing Artists Talk About Their Lives. New York: Dial Press, 1980.
- Cleveland, William. "Rebecca Rice: Building Bridges." Art in Other Places:
- Artists at Work in America's Community and Social Institution. Amherst: Arts Extension Service Press, 2000. 259–71.
- Rice, Rebecca. "Losing Faith (or Gaining Perspective)." Reimaging America: The Arts of Social Change. Ed. Mark O'Brien and Craig Little. Philadelphia: New Society Publishers, 1990. 205–13.
