= Jane Kaufman =

American artist (1938–2021)

- Born: May 26, 1938; New York, New York
- Died: June 2, 2021 (aged 83); Andes, New York
- Occupation: Artist

Jane Kaufman was an American artist who was affiliated with the Pattern and Decoration movement. She was also a member of the art group Guerrilla Girls.

== Early life and education ==
Jane Kaufman was born in New York City to Herbert Kaufman, an advertising executive, and Roslyn Kaufman. She got her B.S. in art education from New York University (1960) and her M.F.A. from Hunter College (1965).

In 1972, Kaufman got a job teaching at Bard College, making her one of their first women professors. Later in her career (1983–91) she was an adjunct instructor at Cooper Union.

During the last years of her life, she lived in the Catskills.

== Career ==
Kaufman began her career in the early 1970s as a minimalist painter of large canvases. She had a solo show at the Whitney museum in 1971 and took part in the 1973 Whitney Biennial, drawing praise from critic Hilton Kramer. She went on to work with decorative motifs in her work as well as decorative materials such as embroidery and other forms of sewing, feathers, and beads. As part of this process, she shifted to making screens, wall hangings, and quilts. Her pattern vocabulary drew inspiration from American quilting traditions as well as from Persian and Japanese textiles and North African mosaics.

Unlike some artists in what became known as the Pattern and Decoration movement, Kaufman's pioneering work in this genre often had a feminist edginess. In 2010 she created an embroidery that galleries did not choose to exhibit - its central message was "Abstinence makes the church grow fondlers". She was a member of the Second Wave feminist art group Guerrilla Girls and was one of the few members of that group to use her own name rather than remain anonymous.

In 1978, Kaufman curated the first Pattern and Decoration group exhibition at Alessandra Gallery in New York. Although the work fell out of prominence in the 1980s and 1990s, the Hudson River Museum held a retrospective in 2008, and another retrospective was mounted by the Museum of Contemporary Art, Los Angeles, in 2019.

Kaufman was awarded both the prestigious Guggenheim fellowship (1974) and grant from the National Endowment for the Arts (1989).

Among Kaufman's public commissions is the sculpture Crystal Hanging in the Tip O’Neill Federal Building in Boston.

Kaufman's work is in the permanent collections of the Museum of Modern Art, the Whitney Museum, and the Smithsonian Institution, among others.

Her image is included in the iconic 1972 poster Some Living American Women Artists by Mary Beth Edelson.

== Personal life ==
Kaufman married the painter Doug Ohlson in 1966. They divorced in the 1970s.
