= Doug Ohlson =

American artist (1936–2010)

Douglas Dean Ohlson (November 18, 1936 – June 29, 2010) was an American abstract artist who specialized in geometric patterns.

Ohlson was born on November 18, 1936, in Cherokee, Iowa and attended Bethel College before serving in the United States Marine Corps. After completing his military service, he attended the University of Minnesota, where he was awarded a degree in studio art in 1961. He moved to New York City, where he studied at Hunter College under abstract sculptor Tony Smith, but dropped out when he could no longer afford tuition. He worked as an assistant to Smith and started teaching at Hunter College in 1964.

Ohlson's early work was included in an exhibit organized by art historian E. C. Goossen at the Hudson River Museum titled "8 Young Artists" in 1964, and had a solo show that year at the Fischbach Gallery, the first of seven at that location. Goossen also included work by Ohlson in the 1968 exhibition "The Art of the Real: 1948-1968" at the Museum of Modern Art which focused on the development and history of geometric art in the United States. Sharply defined and repeated geometric shapes were characteristic of his earliest painting, that were described by Goossen as depicting "yellowish pink and green dawns, blue noons, and red-orange sunsets that swiftly slide from purple to black", hypothesizing that Ohlson's experience growing up and working long days on the family's farm gave him a unique passion for color. Ohlson was recognized with a Guggenheim Fellowship in 1968.

His works in the 1970s and 1980s, often featured at Susan Caldwell Inc., had characteristically rougher backgrounds. His later work was displayed in numerous solo exhibitions at the Andre Zarre Gallery, in addition to surveys of his work at Bennington College and at Hunter College, where he taught for 35 years. His works are included in the collections of the Brooklyn Museum, the Metropolitan Museum of Art and the Whitney Museum of American Art.

Ohlson married twice, first to painter Jane Kaufman, and secondly to Michele Toohey. He died at age 73 on June 29, 2010, after a fall in front of his Manhattan apartment.
