= June Cross =

American documentary director and producer

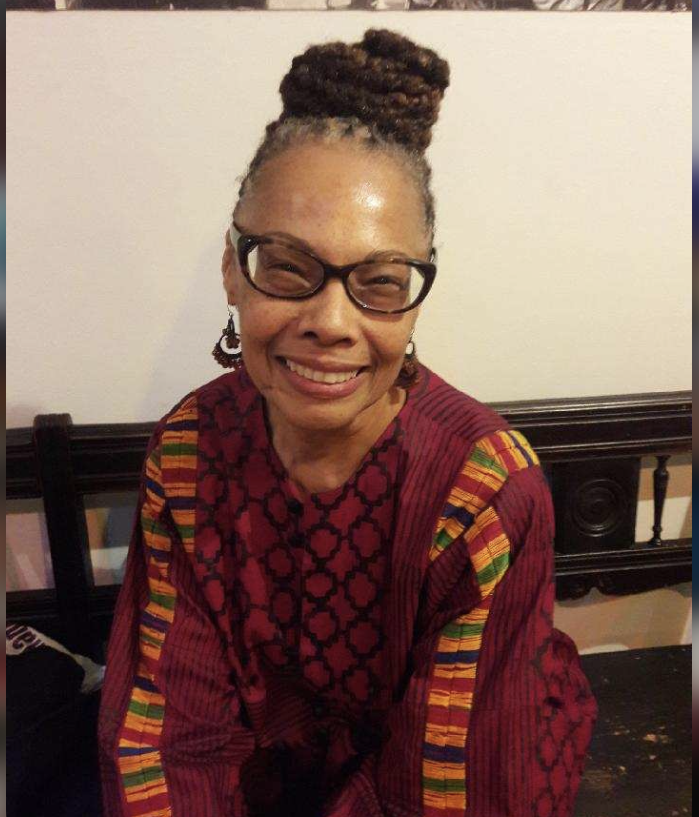
- Born: January 5, 1954 (age 71); New York City, U.S.
- Occupations: Director; writer; producer; professor
- Spouse: Mike Clark

June Cross is an American documentary film director and producer.

== Life and career ==
Cross was born in New York City. She is the daughter of James Cross, half of the vaudeville team of Stump and Stumpy and Norma Booth, an actor. She is the stepdaughter of comedian and actor Larry Storch; and her half sister is the actor Lynda Gravatt. She attended public school in Atlantic City, New Jersey, and graduated from Atlantic City High School in 1971. She attended Harvard- Radcliffe College, and graduated in 1975.

Cross started her career as a copygirl at The Press of Atlantic City while still in college. After graduation, she got a job at WGBH-TV for the broadcast Say Brother. She moved to New York City to take a job as a reporter at the PBS NewsHour in 1979, and eventually became a Producer/Correspondent there. Her work covering the Grenada Invasion won a 1983 News & Documentary Emmy Award. She left the NewsHour in 1986, for a job as a producer for West 57th at CBS News. She also worked as a producer for Face to Face with Connie Chung, America Tonight, and The CBS Evening News.

In 1991, Cross joined PBS' Frontline, where she produced eight documentaries. Her first documentary, A Kid Kills, won the Robert F. Kennedy Journalism Award in 1993. In 1996, she co-directed and produced, Secret Daughter, which won a News & Documentary Emmy Award in 1997 and the Alfred I. duPont–Columbia University Award in 1998. A memoir by the same title was published by Viking in 2006.

In 2001, Cross joined the faculty of the Columbia University Graduate School of Journalism, where in 2010, she founded the documentary specialization. She received an honorary degree from Knox College in 2015. Her PBS Frontline documentary, Whose Vote Counts, won a Peabody Award in 2020.

== Filmography ==
Year	Title	Contribution	Note
1992	A Kid Kills	Producer	Documentary
1994	Showdown in Haiti	Writer and producer	Documentary
1995	The Confessions of RosaLee	Director and producer	Documentary
1996	Secret Daughter	Co-director and producer	Documentary
1998	The Two Nations of Black America	Writer and producer	Documentary
1999	Russian Roulette	Director, writer and producer	Documentary
2003	This Far by Faith	Director and producer	Documentary
2009	The Old Man and the Storm	Director, writer and co-producer	Documentary
2013	Two American Families	Producer	Documentary
2015	Wilhemina's War	Director, writer and producer	Documentary
2020	Whose Vote Counts	Director and writer	Documentary

== Publications ==
- 2006 - Secret Daughter: A Mixed-Race Daughter and the Mother Who Gave Her Away ISBN 978-0-1431121-1-2

== Awards and nominations ==
Year	Result	Award	Category	Work	Ref.
1997	Won	News & Documentary Emmy Awards	Outstanding Informational or Cultural Programming - Programs	Secret Daughter	
2017	Nominated	News & Documentary Emmy Awards	Outstanding Politics and Government Documentary	Wilhemina's War	
