= Josephine Lutz Rollins =

American artist

Josephine Lutz Rollins (1896–1989) was a Minnesota artist. She is best known for her lengthy teaching career at the University of Minnesota from 1927 to 1965 and for founding of the Stillwater Art Colony. Rollins also co-founded the West Lake Gallery in Minneapolis.

== Personal life ==
Rollins was born in Sherburn, Minnesota in 1896. She married Dick Rollins in 1945.

== Education ==
Rollins graduated with a BA from Cornell University (1920) and a MA from the University of Minnesota (1940). She also studied at the Corcoran Art School in Washington DC, the Minnesota School of Art, and the Hans Hoffman School of Art. Rollins also studied with Cameron Booth and credited him as an important influence on her work.

== Career ==
Rollins' work was exhibited at the Minnesota Museum of Art in collaboration with the Minnesota Historical Society in an exhibition showcasing the work of five Minnesota women artists: Francis Cranmer Greenman, Alice Hugy, Clara Mairs, Ada Wolfe, Josephine Lutz Rollins. The exhibition was titled In Her Own Right: Minnesota's First Generation of Women Artists and ran from July–October 2007.

Rollins' work has also been exhibited throughout the US and Minnesota, including at the Minnesota State Fair, the Walker Museum, the Minneapolis Institute of Art, and the Minnesota Historical Society.

== Style and work ==
The St. Croix River Valley was among Rollins's favorite subjects to paint, but she also created watercolors of northern Minnesota and several locations throughout Europe, California and Mexico. Rollins painted primarily outdoors, and in the 1960s switched exclusively to watercolors. Her interest in Minnesota history led her to conduct a multi-year project with the University of Minnesota painting historical landmarks, including houses around the state. Rollins' oil paintings reflect her unique style and application; she often used a palette knife to apply paint directly to the surface.

Her friend and colleague, Bettye Olson, described Rollins as "high energy" and "a fast worker" who "would just get whirling".
