= Women's National Abortion Action Coalition =

US feminist coalition for abortion rights

- Abbreviation: WONAAC
- Formation: 1971
- Type: Feminist coalition
- Purpose: Abortion rights activism
- Headquarters: United States
- Region served: United States
- Official language: English

The Women's National Abortion Action Coalition (WONAAC) was a feminist coalition in the United States which campaigned for the legalization of abortion and the defense of reproductive rights in the United States.

WONAAC organized demonstrations conferences and lobbying campaigns across major U.S. cities in the early 1970s. It brought together members of the women's liberation movement, trade union activists, students and health care workers to demand the repeal of restrictive abortion laws.
