= Bruce Jurgens =

American filmmaker (born 1970)

Bruce L. Jurgens
- Born: Bruce Jurgens; San Diego, California, U.S.
- Education: American University, Washington DC (BA)
- Occupations: film and TV producer, screenwriter, entrepreneur
- Years active: 1995–present

Bruce Jurgens (born July 11, in San Diego, California, United States) is a visual effects producer and writer. A notable work by Jurgens is X-Men.

== Credits ==
- Wayward (2022)
- King Richard (2021)
- Dracula Untold (2014)
- Niech żyje pogrzeb (2008)
- Katyń (2007)
- We're All Christs (2006)
- Click (2006)
- Cursed (2005)
- Mindhunters (2004)
- Final Fantasy: The Spirits Within (2001)
- Open Season (2006)
- Monster House (2006)
- Stealth (2005)
- The Day After Tomorrow (2004)
- Hellboy (2004)
- X-Men (2000)
