= Living Stage Theatre Company =

Living Stage Theatre Company was a theatre for social change founded in 1966 by Robert A. Alexander (1929–2008). He served as the artistic director until 1995. Located in Washington, D.C., this professional improvisational theater offered participatory workshops to children, youth, teachers, parents, and community members. Living Stage’s main philosophy was based on the belief that everyone is born an artist and the act of creation is the ultimate act of self-affirmation. The company's mission was to transform individuals and communities through creative empowerment. The projects that the Living Stage put on typically dealt with controversial and sensitive topics like race, economic inequality, the dangers of an overzealous American foreign policy, the atom bomb, violence, and freedom. The "Baltimore Incident" of 1971 is an example of how controversial these productions could be. No matter how mixed opinions were, the Living Stage always elicited a reaction with their improvisational performances. During the 1980s, the Living Stage began to reach out extensively to local initiatives like The District's Alcohol and Drug Abuse Services Administration and created their own Community Services Project in order to continue to bring theater and creativity to underserved sections of society. The Living Stage championed New Left ideals like equality and social justice throughout the Reagan years, despite some criticisms about their message being "anachronistic". The Living Stage dissolved after 36 years and was a venture of Arena Stage.

== Performance style ==
Performances at Living Stage Theatre were based on improvisation because of its spontaneity. Each performance was considered a work of art and the content arose from the issues and concerns of the participants/audience.

A typical performance was broken into three basic sections. Since the artwork was improvisational, however, the structure of the performance could vary greatly.

=== The jam ===
Before a performance, the actors created a musical "jam" or hook. They created a chorus using musical instruments and voices, based on themes inspired by the group that was attending the performance that day. The audience was asked to sing along, play musical instruments, dance, and create their own verses.

=== The performance ===
After the jam, an improvised theater piece began, performed by the actors and involving poetry, music, movement and song. The theme of the scene was particular to that day's audience. The action of the scene was driven by input from the audience. Sometimes audience members played one or more of the roles in the ending.

=== The workshop ===
Following the performance, the audience participated in a range of artistic activities including movement, creation of characters, scenes, theatre games and open play environments. Conflicts were introduced, and the group was challenged to make choices about how to respond. The actors contributed by creating relationships and playing integral characters to enhance the participants' experience.

Jennifer Nelson, a member of the company, is the co-founder of the Mosaic Theater Company of DC and served as its first resident director.

Another member of the company, Susan Franklin Tanner, is the founder and artistic director of TheatreWorkers Project (TWP), where Tanner and collaborating artists created theatre with unemployed steelworkers from southeast Los Angeles.

Rabbi Mark Novak, music director from 1977-1985, is founder and spiritual leader of MOShDC.org, the world’s only full time Zoomagogue.
