= List of plagiarized books =

The following is a list of books accused of plagiarism, or proven to have been plagiarized. Plagiarism is an act in which a party steals intellectual property from another party, claiming it as their own. This list is not exhaustive and may not reflect recent publications, including self-published and non-notable books.

- List is sorted in alphabetical order by book title.

== Books accused of plagiarism ==
- The Book of the Thousand Nights and a Night (1888) by Richard Francis Burton: accused of plagiarism by various critics and academics, including Thomas Wright.
- The Fixer (1966) by Bernard Malamud: Descendants of Mendel Beilis have long argued that in writing The Fixer, Malamud plagiarized from the 1926 English edition of Beilis's memoir, The Story of My Sufferings. One of Beilis's sons made such claims in correspondence to Malamud when The Fixer was first published. A 2011 edition of Beilis's memoir, co-edited by one of his grandsons, claims to identify 35 instances of plagiarism by Malamud.
- The Jungle Book (1894) by Rudyard Kipling: In a letter written and signed by Kipling in or around 1895, states Alison Flood in The Guardian, Kipling confesses to borrowing ideas and stories in the Jungle Book: "I am afraid that all that code in its outlines has been manufactured to meet 'the necessities of the case': though a little of it is bodily taken from (Southern) Esquimaux rules for the division of spoils," Kipling wrote in the letter. "In fact, it is extremely possible that I have helped myself promiscuously but at present cannot remember from whose stories I have stolen."

== Books that have been plagiarized ==
- The Roman, a novel by Finnish writer Mika Waltari – In July 2008, news emerged that television producer Colin Slater had plagiarized the novel in his 2003 novel Lindum Colonia.
- Sloppy Firsts and Second Helpings, two books by Megan McCafferty, reportedly plagiarized by Harvard student and genre fiction prodigy Kaavya Viswanathan in her own novel How Opal Mehta Got Kissed, Got Wild and Got A Life. This was extensively covered by the media, with McCafferty comparing sentences in her own two books verbatim to the plagiarizing novel of Viswanathan's. Viswanathan admitted to the phenomenon of "unconscious plagiarism" in her book (this has never been proven to exist).

== See also ==
- List of songs subject to plagiarism disputes
