= Born Confused =

2002 novel by Tanuja Desai Hidier

- 1st edition hardcover
- Author: Tanuja Desai Hidier
- Language: English
- Genre: Young adult fiction
- Publisher: Scholastic Press
- Publication date: UK: October 1, 2002; US: July 1, 2003
- Publication place: United Kingdom
- Media type: Print (Hardback and paperback)
- Pages: 432 pp
- ISBN: 0-439-35762-4
- OCLC: 49601981
- LC Class: PZ7.D44885 Bo 2002

Born Confused is a 2002 young adult novel by Tanuja Desai Hidier about an Indian-American girl growing up in New Jersey. First published in the United Kingdom on October 1, 2002, it was later released in the United States on July 1, 2003.

Hidier wrote Born Confused in 2000/2001, drawing "largely from autobiography." She said in 2006:

"I hadn't read any books I could recall with a South Asian American teen protagonist [before I wrote mine] ... To the best of my knowledge Born Confused was the first book with a US female teen desi heroine; that was one of the reasons my publisher wanted it, and it is certainly one of the reasons I wrote it – it was, and is, important to me that a young South Asian American have a voice, and that it be heard and read by people of all backgrounds and ages. And it is just as important that other South Asian American voices be heard; the more out there the more we can begin to approximate expressing the richness and diversity of this culture – the flip side being the fewer out there the more susceptible one becomes to a stereotyping of sorts, to sometimes having to carry the impossible responsibility of representing a culture that is as diverse as the number of people who make it up."

An excerpt of Born Confused had appeared in Seventeen magazine in 2002. Hidier was subsequently contacted by book packaging company 17th Street Productions (now called Alloy Entertainment), but she declined their offer to collaborate on an "Indian-American teen story."

Hidier had also published a short story called "Cowgirls & Indie Boys" in a 2004 anthology edited by McCafferty called Sixteen: Stories About That Sweet and Bitter Birthday.

== Plot ==
Seventeen-year-old Dimple is too American in India, and yet struggling to conform in America. She and her blonde, blue-eyed best friend Gwyn share "outsider status" as "the rich little girl who lived like an orphan and the brown little girl who existed as if she were still umbilically attached to her parents." Both resisting and ultimately embracing her family's culture and traditions, Dimple navigates suitable/unsuitable boy Karsh Kapoor, her interest in photography, and "a number of tricky situations."

== Legacy ==
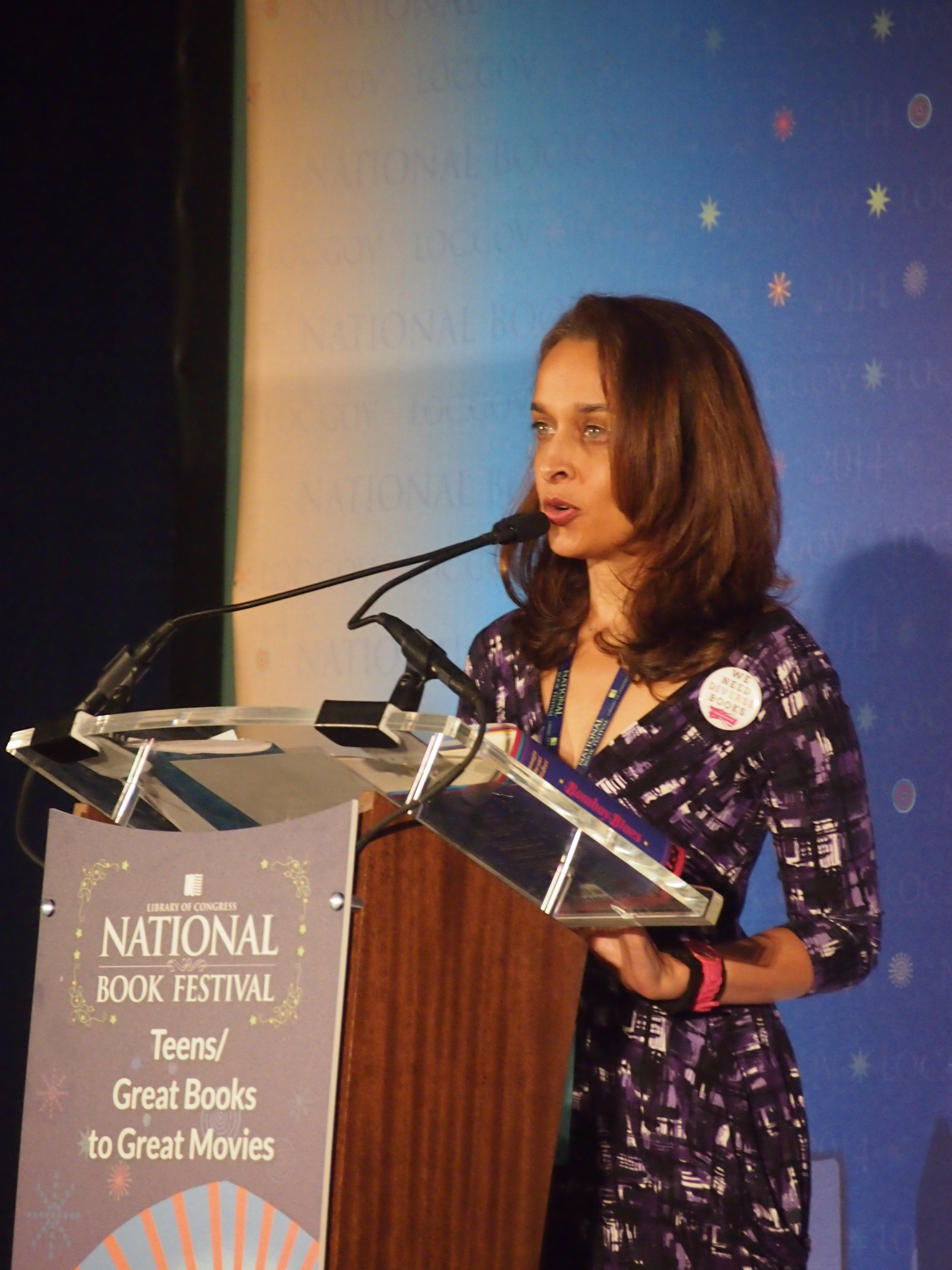
Author Tanuja Desai Hidier speaks at the 2014 National Book Festival.

Born Confused has been lauded by fellow novelist Sandhya Menon as being "the flagship for other South Asian young adult novels.” Kajal Magazine, which strives to cultivate a space of creativity and commentary for members of the South Asian diaspora, also praised the novel as revolutionary, explaining that "That book was community and it created community."

Placing the protagonist in the liminal space of being Indian-American and struggling with both sides of that identity, the book allowed young Indian-Americans to find representation and belonging at a time when it was even scarcer than it is today.

== Controversy ==
In 2006, the novel was identified as having been one of several works allegedly plagiarized by new novelist Kaavya Viswanathan. On May 3, 2006, The Harvard Independent reported that Harvard University student Kaavya Viswanathan's highly publicized debut young adult novel How Opal Mehta Got Kissed, Got Wild, and Got a Life (2006) contained "imagery, sentence structure, and paragraph organization" which was "strikingly similar" to material in Born Confused. The Independent pointed out three similar passages between the books; Hidier herself later found "two dozen instances of lifting from Born Confused in the Opal Mehta book." Portions of Viswanathan's novel had previously been alleged to have been plagiarized from several other sources, including Megan McCafferty's first two Jessica Darling novels Sloppy Firsts (2001) and Second Helpings (2003), and Meg Cabot's The Princess Diaries (2000). 17th Street/Alloy had helped Viswanathan "conceptualize and plot the book," and shares the novel's copyright.
