= Gargoyle Magazine =

American literary magazine

- Editor: Richard Peabody, Lucinda Ebersole
- Categories: Literary magazine
- Publisher: Paycock Press
- First issue: 1976
- Country: United States
- Website: www.gargoylemagazine.com
- ISSN: 0162-1149

Gargoyle Magazine is a literary magazine based in Washington, D.C. It was established in 1976 by Russell Cox, Richard Peabody, and Paul Pasquarella. By 1977, Peabody was the only remaining original editor. He continued running the magazine until 1990 with several different co-editors. Before the magazine ceased publication in 1990, 36 issues had been released. It resurfaced in 1997 with Peabody and Lucinda Ebersole as editors and continues to this day.

Gargoyle is dedicated to printing works by unknown poets and fiction writers, as well as seeking out the overlooked or neglected writers. It is considered an anthology that publishes both local and international authors, the magazine featured poetry, fiction, articles, art, photos, interviews, satire, reviews, long poems, and novel excerpts. The magazine has published work by authors as diverse as Angela Threatt, Joyce Renwick, Julia Slavin, Mary Kay Zuravleff, Ray Bradbury, Kathy Acker, Robert Peters, Radoslav Rochallyi and Nick Cave. Gargoyle has also published authors who have won the Pulitzer Prize, the MacArthur Fellowship, and the National Book Award among other honors. Each contributor receives one issue as compensation for their literary piece. Work from the magazine has been included in The Best American Fantasy, The Best American Non-Required Reading, New Stories from the South, and The Year's Best Fantasy and Horror.

In 1999, the magazine won a $7,500 grant from the London Arts Board.

The magazine's archive is housed in the Special Collections Research Center of the Estelle and Melvin Gelman Library at George Washington University.
