= Richard Peabody =

American journalist

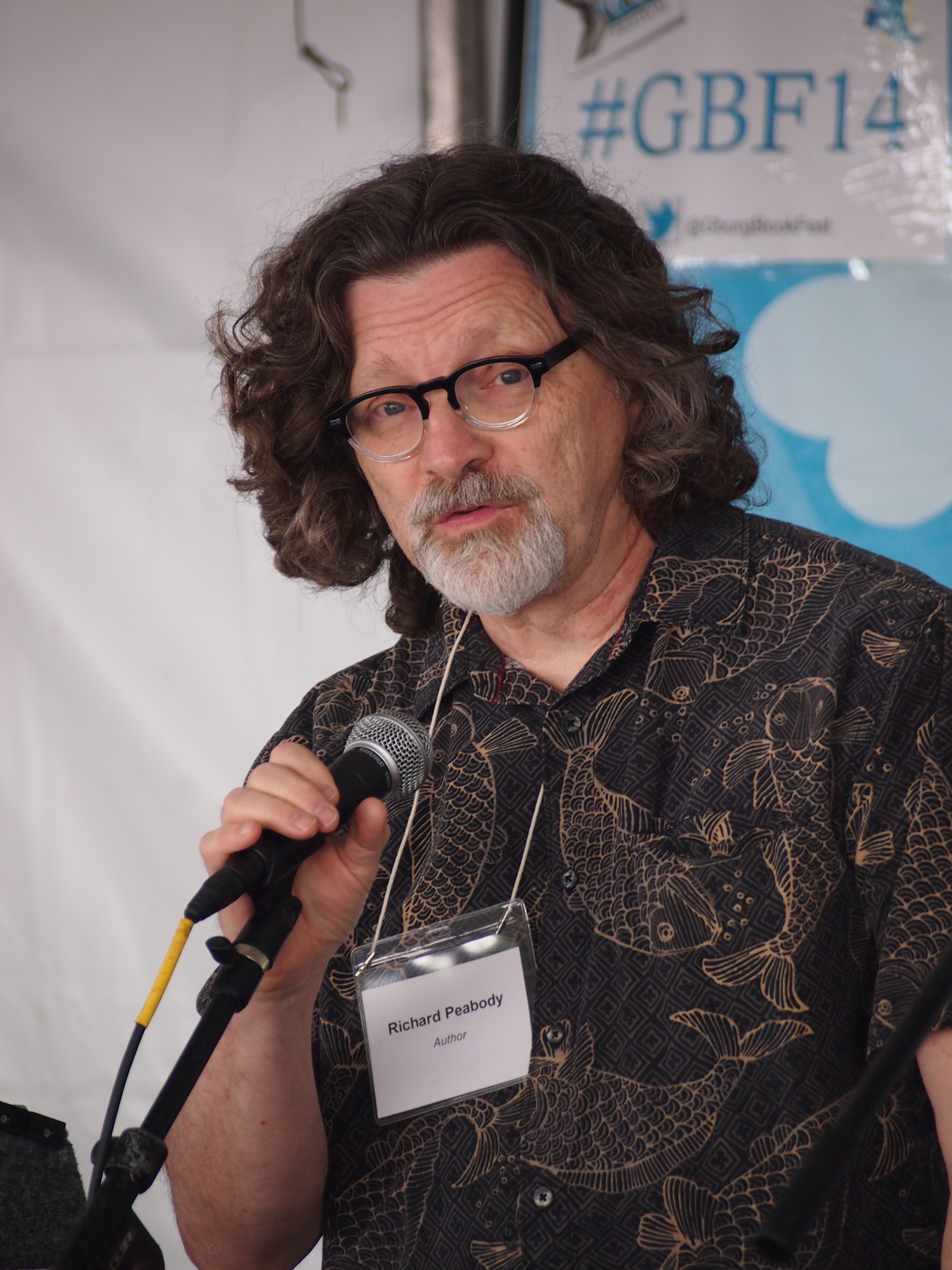
- Peabody at the 2014 Gaithersburg Book Festival
- Education: University of Maryland; American University
- Writing career
- Language: English
- Genre: Poetry
- Notable work: Gargoyle Magazine
- Website: www.gargoylemagazine.com

Richard Peabody is a poet, editor, and publisher, based in Washington, D.C.

== Biography ==
A native of the Washington DC metropolitan region, Peabody received a B.A. in English from the University of Maryland in 1973 and a M.A. in Literature from American University in 1975.

Peabody is perhaps best known as one of the founding editors for Gargoyle Magazine, which he largely funded with his own income. He is also editor for the anthology series Mondo and runs a small press called Paycock Press. Paycock Press was originally established in 1976 to publish Gargoyle Magazine, but it also has released a number of anthologies and works by individual authors.

Peabody's own fiction and poetry is often set in Washington, D.C. and the surrounding region. It is often noted for strong influences from the Beat Generation and experimental authors of the 1960s such as Ken Kesey.

During his writing and publishing career, Peabody has taught fiction writing for the University of Maryland, University of Virginia, Johns Hopkins University, and the Writer's Center. In addition, Peabody has taught creative writing courses and workshops at St. John's College, Writer's Center, Georgetown University, and University of Maryland.

He currently resides in Arlington, Virginia, with his wife and two daughters.

== Selected publications ==
as Editor

- Abundant Grace: More Fiction by D.C. Area Women. (Cover art by Lisa Montag Brotman). Paycock Press, 2016. ISBN 978-0931181443
- Defying Gravity: Fiction by D.C. Area Women. (Cover art by Sheep Jones). Paycock Press, 2014. ISBN 978-0931181405
- Amazing Graces: Yet Another Collection of Fiction by Washington Area Women. (Cover art by Sheep Jones). Paycock Press, 2012. ISBN 978-0931181351
- Gravity Dancers: Even More Fiction by Washington Area Women. (Cover art by Sheep Jones). Paycock Press, 2009. ISBN 978-0931181306
- Electric Grace: Still More Fiction by Washington Area Women. (Cover art by Jody Mussoff). Paycock Press, 2007. ISBN 978-0931181252
- Enhanced Gravity: More Fiction by Washington Area Women. (Cover art by Jody Mussoff). Paycock Press, 2006. ISBN 9780931181207
- Sex and Chocolate: Tasty Morsels for the Mind and Body. (Co-edited with Lucinda Ebersole). Paycock Press, 2006. ISBN 9780931181214
- Alice Redux: New Stories of Alice, Lewis and Wonderland. Paycock Press, 2006. ISBN 9780931181221
- Conversations with Gore Vidal. (Co-edited with Lucinda Ebersole). University of Mississippi Press. 2005. ISBN 9781578066735. "richard peabody."
- Grace and Gravity: Fiction by Washington Area Women. (Cover art by Jody Mussoff). Paycock Press, 2004. ISBN 9780931181184
- A Different Beat: Writings by Women of the Beat Generation. Serpent's Tail, 1997.
- Mondo James Dean. (Co-edited with Lucinda Ebersole). St. Martin's Press, 1996.
- Coming to Terms: A Literary Response to Abortion. (Co-edited with Lucinda Ebersole). The New Press, 1995. ISBN 9781565841888
- Mondo Marilyn. (Co-edited with Lucinda Ebersole). St. Martin's Press, 1995. ISBN 9780312118532
- Mondo Elvis. (Co-edited with Lucinda Ebersole). St. Martin's Press, 1994. ISBN 9780312105051
- Mondo Barbie. (Co-edited with Lucinda Ebersole). St. Martin's Press. 1993. ISBN 9780312088484.
- Mavericks: Nine Independent Publishers. Paycock Press, 1983. ISBN 9780960242498
- DC Magazines: A Literary Retrospective. Paycock Press, 1982.

as Author

- The Richard Peabody Reader, Alan Squire Publishing, 2015, ISBN 978-0984832989
- Speed Enforced by Aircraft, Broadkill River Press, 2012, ISBN 9780982603062
- Blue Suburban Skies, Main Street Rag, 2012, ISBN 9781599483764
- Last of the Red Hot Magnetos. Paycock Press, 2004. ISBN 9780931181160
- Sugar Mountain. Argonne Hotel Press, 2000. ISBN 9781887641425
- Open Joints on Bridge. Argonne Hotel Press, 1999. ISBN 9781887641234
- Mood Vertigo. Argonne Hotel Press, 1999. ISBN 9781887641395
- Paraffin Days: A Collection of Stories. Cumberland Press, 1995. ISBN 9780937998113
- Buoyancy and Other Myths. Gut Punch Press, 1995. ISBN 9780945144069
- Sad Fashions. Gut Punch Press, 1990. ISBN 9780945144014
- I'm in Love With The Morton Salt Girl. Paycock Press, 1979. ISBN 9780960242481
