= Louise Wareham Leonard =

American writer

- Born: New Zealand
- Citizenship: American
- Education: Columbia College, Columbia University (BA); International Institute of Modern Letters (MA)

Louise Wareham Leonard is an American writer born in New Zealand. She has three brothers, one of whom is Dean Wareham of Galaxie 500 and Luna.

== Early life ==
Leonard was an intern at TIME Magazine age 20, while a student at Columbia College, New York, then a magazine writer, mostly in travel. She was also a part-time assistant to Black liberation theology founder Rev. Prof. James H. Cone at the Union Theological Seminary.

In 2011, she co-established a not-for-profit aboriginal-owned art center in the outback town of Mt Magnet in Western Australia.

== Author ==
Her novels and novellas explore "the search for sanity" (according to Dame Fiona Kidman) in a world of "priapic narcissism" (according to John Newton).

Since You Ask is an "intense and insightful work about a childhood sexual abuse survivor that portrays a complicated character and her multifaceted mind with deep empathy." It won the 1999 James Jones Literary Society First Novel Award.

52 Men centers on Elise McKnight and fifty-two vignettes of her interactions with various men. The Los Angeles Review of Books wrote "Although in style and tone[,] 52 Men differs from either Elizabeth Hardwick’s Sleepless Nights or Renata Adler’s Speedboat, it is, like both of these books, a novel of impressions unified by the author’s sensibility".

Other publications by Leonard include Blood Is Blood and the essay "The German Crowd" (2020). Her work has been published in Poetry, Tin House, TheRumpus.net, Art Monthly Australia and elsewhere.

== Podcast ==
Leonard also founded, produced and hosted 52 Men, the Podcast: Women Telling Stories about Men, a 25 episode series featuring one writer per episode. Authors include Lynne Tillman, Mia Funk, Jane Alison, Caroline Leavitt, Emily Holleman, Eliza Factor, and Julia Slavin.

== Works ==
- Fiery World (Amazon Kindle, 2022)
- Blood is Blood (Amazon Kindle, 2022)
- Since You Ask (Akashic Books, New York, 2004)
- Miss Me A Lot Of (Victoria University Press, New Zealand, 2007)
- 52 Men (Red Hen Press, Pasadena, 2015)
- "The German Crowd" (Subnivean, 2020)

== Awards and honors ==
- 1986 Columbia College, Columbia University Representative in the Mount Holyoke Poetry Prize, with judges Seamus Heaney and Joseph Brodsky
- 1986 Columbia College, Columbia University, Andrew D. Fried Memorial Prize "given to a senior in Columbia College judged by the Columbia College English Department to have excelled in both critical and creative writing"
- 1999 James Jones First Novel Award for a novel in Progress
- 2006, 2008 Finalist for The New Zealand Prize in Modern Letters
- 2008 Creative New Zealand Grant
- 2016 Founding Member of the Academy of New Zealand Literature
