= Asian American Action Fund =

U.S. nonprofit organization

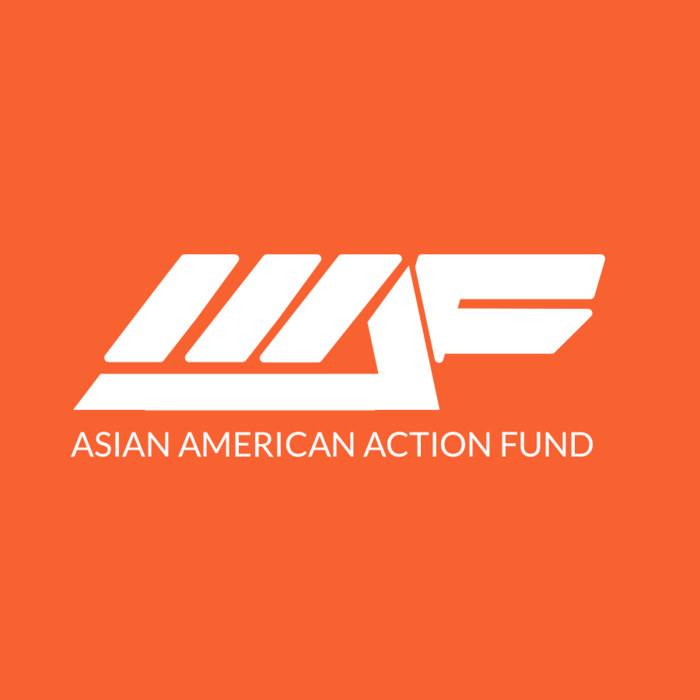
- Formation: 1999; 27 years ago
- Legal status: Political action committee
- Purpose: Asian American political participation
- Headquarters: Washington, D.C.
- Location: 707 H St NW Ste 200, Washington, DC 20001
- Main organ: board of directors
- Affiliations: Hyphen Magazine, CAPAC, Angry Asian Man, 18 Million Rising, APIAVote, NCAPA, AALDEF, Ready PAC, WHAAPI, ASPIRE PAC
- Staff: 1
- Volunteers: 100+
- Website: AAAFund.org

The Asian American Action Fund (AAAFund) is an American Democratic political action committee founded in 1999. AAAFund receives financial support from foundations, corporations, individuals, and fundraisers. AAAF receives no government funds.

== Purpose ==
AAAFund's goal is to increase the voice of Asian Americans and Pacific Islanders (AAPIs) in every level of local, state and federal government in the United States. Specifically, AAAFund addresses the under-representation of AAPIs by organizing campaign volunteers, campaign contributions, technical support, and logistics for both endorsed and un-endorsed candidates running for political office. AAAFund has regional chapters in Northern California, Chicago, Northern Virginia/Maryland/District of Columbia, Southern Ohio, Georgia, and New York City as well as a young professional chapter.

== History ==
In October 2007, AAAF Board members Gautam Dutta and Caroline Fan started its blog.

On May 31, 2008, the DNC awarded the AAAF blog team press credentials, one of only two Asian-American blogs, along with Sepia Mutiny, to receive them.

On June 10, 2008, Kelly Hu was the emcee of the AAAF's annual fundraiser.

On August 8, 2008, the Library of Congress recognized the AAAF Blog as an "outstanding" source of information on the internet during the 2008 Presidential election and added the AAAF Blog to its Election 2008 Web Archive Collection.

On May 5, 2010, the AAAF and Hyphen Magazine announced a cross-posting partnership.
