= James Jones Literary Society =

The James Jones Literary Society is an association that honors American author James Jones by sponsoring a number of literature awards.

== History ==
The Society was founded in 1991 at Lincoln Trail College, Robinson, Illinois. As of 2008, it had nearly 300 members from 34 states and 5 countries. The Society sponsors a national symposium every year, when the First Novel Fellowship is awarded; these are held in different locations, but return every third year to Robinson, Jones's home town.

== First Novel Fellowship ==
The Society's best known award is the Annual James Jones First Novel Fellowship, co-sponsored by Wilkes University. It was established in 1992, and as of 2025 is a $12,000 prize, and two $1,000 runner up awards, awarded to American authors of first novels in progress that honor "the spirit of unblinking honesty, determination, and insight into modern culture" that Jones's works exemplified. 667 entries were received for the 2011 contest.

Laine Cunningham, winner of the 2003 award for her novel Message Stick, credits the award for US and international agents beginning to call her. She has since sponsored her own writing award.

=== Awards ===
Year	Author	Work	Published	Notes
1993	Nancy Flynn	Eden Undone		$2,000, 143 entries.
1994	Mary Kay Zuravleff	The Frequency of Souls	Farrar Straus & Giroux, 1996, ISBN 978-0-374-15851-4	403 entries.
1995	Rick Bass	Where the Sea Used To Be	Houghton Mifflin, 1998, ISBN 978-0-395-77015-3	$2,500, also awarded to Tanuja Desai Hidier.
1995	Tanuja Desai Hidier	Tale of a Two-Hearted Tiger		$2,500, also awarded to Rick Bass.
1996	Greg Hrbek	The Hindenburg Crashes Nightly	William Morrow, 1999, ISBN 978-0-380-97741-3	$2,500.
1997	Leslie Schwartz	Jumping the Green	Simon & Schuster, 1999, ISBN 978-0-684-85589-9	
1998	Judith Barnes	A Year in the Woods		$2,500. 470 entries.
1999	Louise Wareham Leonard	Since You Ask	Akashic Books, 2004, ISBN 978-1-888451-63-4	$3,000.
2000	Steven Phillip Policoff	Beautiful Somewhere Else	Carroll & Graf, 2004, ISBN 978-0-7867-1321-9	$5,000. 566 entries.
2001	Ray Cristina	Tracking Ginger	CreateSpace, 2010, ISBN 978-1-4499-8701-5	$5,000.
2002	Linda Busby Parker	Seven Laurels	Southeast Missouri State University Press, 2004, ISBN 978-0-9724304-7-0	
2003	Laine Cunningham	Message Stick	Sun Dogs Creations, 2008, ISBN 978-0-9822399-0-2	$6,000.
2004	~~John Smelcer~~	~~The Trap~~		593 entries. Award rescinded in 2015.
2005	Anne Campisi	The Lime Tree		$10,000.
2006	Herta Feely	The Trials of Serra Blue		
2007	Robin Oliveira	My Name is Mary Sutter	Viking Press, 2010, ISBN 0-670-02167-9	Working title The Last Beautiful Day.
2008	Margarite Landry	Blue Moon		$10,000. 520 entries.
2009	Tena Russ	After Paradise		$10,000, 674 entries.
2010	Gina Ventre	Moon's Extra Mile		$10,000, 520 entries.
2011	Robert Shuster	To Zenzi	New Issues Poetry & Prose, 2021, ISBN 9781936970698	$10,000, 667 entries.
2012	Lise Brody	For One Thing She Did		$10,000, 585 entries.
2013	Margot Singer	The Art of Fugue	As Underground Fugue, Melville House Publishing, 2017, ISBN 9781612196282	$10,000, 666 entries.
2014	Cam Terwilliger	Yet Wilderness Grew in My Heart		$10,000.
2015	Josie Sigler	The Flying Sampietrini		$10,000.
2015	Alison Murphy	Balagan		$10,000.
2017	Erin Kate Ryan	Quantum Girl Theory	Random House, 2022, ISBN 978-0-593-13343-9	$10,000.
2018	Alicia Upano	Big Music		$10,000.
2019	Marco Kaye	Levon		$10,000.
2020	Morgan M.X. Schulz	Good Morning, Dr. Du Bois		$10,000.
2021	Rose Whitmore	Feats of Strength in the Time of Hoxha		$10,000, more than 700 entries.
2022	Beenish Ahmed	Every Song an Elegy		$10,000
2023	Catherine Carberry	Bitter Tropic		$10,000
2024	Thomas Andrew Green and Julie Ries	Soon as I Find Jake and The Hunger Bride		$9,000 to each winner
2025	Emma Binder	Small Heaven		$12,000

== Other awards ==
Since 2006, the Society has co-sponsored the annual Illinois Emerging Writers Competition, created in 2005 by Secretary of State of Illinois and State Librarian Jesse White. Originally this consisted solely of the Gwendolyn Brooks Poetry Award, but since the co-sponsorship of the Society, it has also included the James Jones Short Story Award. Each category carries prizes of $500, $300, and $100 for unpublished works. Both are named after Illinois writers.

Since 2007, the Society has been working to establish the James Jones Chair in World War II Studies at Eastern Illinois University.

The Society sponsors an annual Valentine Essay Contest, based on Jones's short story, "The Valentine", for high school seniors from Crawford County, Illinois and Clark County, Illinois. The $75 and $50 prizes are awarded on Valentine's Day.
