= IvyWise =

- Industry: Consulting
- Founded: 1998
- Headquarters: New York City, United States
- Key people: Katherine Cohen (founder and CEO)
- Website: www.ivywise.com

IvyWise is a for-profit educational consulting firm headquartered in New York, US.

The firm was involved in the Kaavya Viswanathan plagiarism controversy as the organization that referred Viswanathan to the William Morris Agency and 17th Street Productions.

== See also ==
- College admissions in the United States
- Transfer admissions in the United States
