= How Opal Mehta Got Kissed, Got Wild, and Got a Life =

2006 book by Kaavya Viswanathan

- Author: Kaavya Viswanathan
- Language: English
- Genre: Young adult fiction
- Publisher: Little Brown and Company
- Publication date: April 4, 2006
- Publication place: United States
- Media type: Print (Hardcover)
- Pages: 314 pp.
- ISBN: 978-0-316-05988-6
- Dewey Decimal: 813/.6 22
- LC Class: PS3622.I79 H69 2006

How Opal Mehta Got Kissed, Got Wild, and Got a Life is a controversial young adult novel by Kaavya Viswanathan, written just after she graduated from high school. Its 2006 debut was highly publicized while she was enrolled at Harvard University, but the book was withdrawn after it was discovered that portions had been plagiarized from several sources, including the works of Megan McCafferty, Salman Rushdie, and Meg Cabot.

Viswanathan immediately apologized and stated that similarities were "completely unintentional and unconscious." All shelf copies of Opal Mehta were ultimately recalled and destroyed by the publisher, and Viswanathan's contract for a second book was canceled.

== Book deal ==
While attending Bergen County Academies, Viswanathan showed her writing – including a several-hundred-page novel on Irish history she had already completed – to Katherine Cohen of IvyWise, a private college admissions consultancy which Viswanathan's parents had hired to help with their daughter's application process. Through Cohen, Viswanathan was signed by the William Morris Agency under senior agent and William Morris partner Jennifer Rudolph Walsh and referred to book packaging company 17th Street Productions (now called Alloy Entertainment), a media firm responsible for packaging the Gossip Girl and The Sisterhood of the Traveling Pants book series, among others. On the basis of an outline and four chapters of the novel that would become Opal Mehta, Viswanathan eventually signed a two-book deal with Little, Brown and Company for an advance originally reported to be $500,000. She began writing the book the summer before college, and finished it during her freshman year at Harvard College, while taking a full course load. Opal Mehta was published on April 4, 2006, and Viswanathan was profiled by The New York Times two days later.

Opal Mehta centers on an academically oriented Indian-American girl who, after being told by a Harvard College admissions officer that she is not well-rounded, doggedly works to become a typical American teen: ultrasocial, shopping- and boy-driven, and carelessly hip. With Publishers Weekly calling the book "Legally Blonde in reverse," Viswanathan stated that her own college prep experience had inspired the novel: "I was surrounded by the stereotype of high-pressure Asian and Indian families trying to get their children into Ivy League schools." When asked about her influences in an interview given to The Star-Ledger of Newark, New Jersey (before any allegations of plagiarism had surfaced), Viswanathan responded that "nothing I read gave me the inspiration" to write the novel.

Michael Pietsch later told The New York Times that Viswanathan's advance for her two-book deal was less than the previously publicized amount of $500,000, and that it was split between the author and Alloy Entertainment. Alloy President Leslie Morgenstein asserted that while the firm helped Viswanathan "conceptualize and plot the book," it did not help with the actual writing. Though Alloy was no longer involved once the book was sold to Little, Brown, the company shares the copyright with Viswanathan. Her agent Walsh told The New York Times that the plot and writing of Opal Mehta had been "1,000 percent" Viswanathan's. The novel was edited by Asya Muchnick at Little, Brown, and the movie rights to the book were sold to DreamWorks SKG in February 2006.

Opal Mehta garnered mixed reviews, many of which described Viswanathan as an author of "chick lit."

== Plagiarism ==
=== Megan McCafferty ===
On April 23, 2006, The Harvard Crimson reported that several portions of Opal Mehta appeared to have been plagiarized from Megan McCafferty's first two "Jessica Darling" novels, Sloppy Firsts (2001) and Second Helpings (2003), noting over a dozen similar passages. At the time, Viswanathan's novel had reached 32nd on The New York Times's hardcover fiction bestseller list. McCafferty's third Jessica Darling novel, Charmed Thirds, had just been released a week after Opal Mehta, and was No. 19 on the same list.

McCafferty stated that she had learned about Viswanathan's plagiarism through a fan's e-mail on April 11, 2006, the same day Charmed Thirds was released and nearly two weeks before the story went public. According to McCafferty, the email's subject read: "'Flattery or a case for litigation.' I thought, oh my God, somebody's suing me." Prompted by the email's allegations, McCafferty looked at Opal Mehta and later said that reading Viswanathan's book was like "recognizing your own child's face. My own words were just leaping out at me page after page after page." Contacted by the Crimson the day before they broke the story, McCafferty responded via email: "I'm already aware of this situation, and so is my publisher ... After reading the book in question, and finding passages, characters, and plot points in common, I do hope this can be resolved in a manner that is fair to all of the parties involved."

On April 24, 2006, Little, Brown issued a statement from Viswanathan:

"When I was in high school, I read and loved two wonderful novels by Megan McCafferty, Sloppy Firsts and Second Helpings, which spoke to me in a way few other books did. Recently, I was very surprised and upset to learn that there are similarities between some passages in my novel ... and passages in these books ... While the central stories of my book and hers are completely different, I wasn't aware of how much I may have internalized Ms. McCafferty's words. I am a huge fan of her work and can honestly say that any phrasing similarities between her works and mine were completely unintentional and unconscious. My publisher and I plan to revise my novel for future printings to eliminate any inappropriate similarities ... I sincerely apologize to Megan McCafferty and to any who feel they have been misled by these unintentional errors on my part."

Viswanathan's agent Walsh stated, "Knowing what a fine person Kaavya is, I believe any similarities were unintentional. Teenagers tend to adopt each other's language." The day after Viswanathan's admission, Steve Ross of Crown Publishing Group – a subsidiary of Random House and the publisher of Sloppy Firsts and Second Helpings – issued a statement in response:

"We find both the responses of Little Brown and their author Kaavya Viswanathan deeply troubling and disingenuous. Ms. Viswanathan's claim that similarities in her phrasing were 'unconscious' or 'unintentional' is suspect. We have documented more than forty passages from Kaavya Viswanathan's recent publication How Opal Mehta Got Kissed, Got Wild, and Got a Life that contain identical language and/or common scene or dialogue structure from Megan McCafferty's first two books, Sloppy Firsts and Second Helpings. This extensive taking from Ms. McCafferty's books is nothing less than an act of literary identity theft ... Based on the scope and character of the similarities, it is inconceivable that this was a display of youthful innocence or an unconscious or unintentional act."

Ross said later: "We all felt it was important that we come to [McCafferty's] defense and make clear that we support our author. The notion that this was accidental stretches credibility to the breaking point." McCafferty's agent Joanna Pulcini also identified 45 "strikingly similar" passages, stating via email that "Many include identical phrasing, establish primary characters, and contain shared plot developments. ... It is understandably difficult for us to accept that Ms. Viswanathan's plagiarism was 'unintentional and unconscious,' as she has claimed." Ross added that at that time, McCafferty was "devastated" by the plagiarism, feeling "like something fundamental was taken" and "not sleeping, not eating."

In an April 26, 2006 interview with The New York Times, Viswanathan suggested that some of the plagiarism may have happened because she read both of McCafferty's books multiple times and has a photographic memory. "I remember by reading," she said. "I never take notes." She added "I've never read a novel with an Indian-American protagonist ... The plot points are reflections of my own experience. I'm an Indian-American."

==== Sample passages ====
McCafferty's Sloppy Firsts and Second Helpings	Viswanathan's Opal Mehta
Sloppy Firsts, page 7: "Bridget is my age and lives across the street. For the first twelve years of my life, these qualifications were all I needed in a best friend. But that was before Bridget's braces came off and her boyfriend Burke got on, before Hope and I met in our seventh grade Honors classes."	page 14: "Priscilla was my age and lived two blocks away. For the first fifteen years of my life, those were the only qualifications I needed in a best friend. We had bonded over our mutual fascination with the abacus in a playgroup for gifted kids. But that was before freshman year, when Priscilla's glasses came off, and the first in a long string of boyfriends got on."
Sloppy Firsts, page 6: "Sabrina was the brainy Angel. Yet another example of how every girl had to be one or the other: Pretty or smart. Guess which one I got. You'll see where it's gotten me."	page 39: "Moneypenny was the brainy female character. Yet another example of how every girl had to be one or the other: smart or pretty. I had long resigned myself to category one, and as long as it got me to Harvard, I was happy. Except, it hadn't gotten me to Harvard. Clearly, it was time to switch to category two."
Second Helpings, page 67: "... but in a truly sadomasochistic dieting gesture, they chose to buy their Diet Cokes at Cinnabon."	page 46: "In a truly masochistic gesture, they had decided to buy Diet Cokes from Mrs. Fields ..."
Sloppy Firsts, page 23: "He's got dusty reddish dreads that a girl could never run her hands through. His eyes are always half-shut. His lips are usually curled in a semi-smile, like he's in on a big joke that's being played on you but you don't know it yet."	page 48: "He had too-long shaggy brown hair that fell into his eyes, which were always half shut. His mouth was always curled into a half smile, like he knew about some big joke that was about to be played on you."
Sloppy Firsts, page 68: "Tanning was the closest that Sara came to having a hobby, other than gossiping, that is. Even the webbing between her fingers was the color of coffee without cream. Even for someone with her Italian heritage and dark coloring, it was unnatural and alienlike."	page 48: "It was obvious that next to casual hookups, tanning was her extracurricular activity of choice. Every visible inch of skin matched the color and texture of her Louis Vuitton backpack. Even combined with her dark hair and Italian heritage, she looked deep-fried."
Second Helpings, page 69: "Throughout this conversation, Manda acted like she couldn't have been more bored. She lazily skimmed her new paperback copy of Reviving Ophelia—she must have read the old one down to shreds. She just stood there, popping another piece of Doublemint, or reapplying her lip gloss, or slapping her ever-present pack of Virginia Slims against her palm. (Insert oral fixation jokes, here, here and here.) Her hair—usually dishwater brown and wavy—had been straightened and bleached the color of sweet corn since the last time I saw her...Just when I thought she had maxed out on hooter hugeness, it seemed that whatever poundage Sara had lost over the summer had turned up in Manda's bra."	page 48: "The other HBz acted like they couldn't be more bored. They sat down at a table, lazily skimmed heavy copies of Italian Vogue, popped pieces of Orbit, and reapplied layers of lip gloss. Jennifer, who used to be a bit on the heavy side, had dramatically slimmed down, no doubt through some combination of starvation and cosmetic surgery. Her lost pounds hadn't completely disappeared, though; whatever extra pounds she'd shed from her hips had ended up in her bra. Jennifer's hair, which I remembered as dishwater brown and riotously curly, had been bleached Clairol 252: Never Seen in Nature Blonde. It was also so straight it looked washed, pressed and starched."
Sloppy Firsts, page 23: "Though I used to see him sometimes at Hope's house, Marcus and I had never, ever acknowledged each other's existence before. So I froze, not knowing whether I should (a) laugh (b) say something (c) ignore him and keep on walking ... 'Uh, yeah. Ha. Ha. Ha.' ... I turned around and saw that Marcus was smiling at me."	page 49: "Though I had been to school with him for the last three years, Sean Whalen and I had never acknowledged each other's existence before. I froze, unsure of (a) what he was talking about and (b) what I was supposed to do about it ... 'Ha, yeah. Uh, ha. Ha.' ... I looked up and saw that Sean was grinning."
Sloppy Firsts, page 237: "Finally, four major department stores and 170 specialty shops later, we were done."	page 51: "Five department stores, and 170 specialty shops later, I was sick of listening to her hum along to Alicia Keys..."
Second Helpings, page 68: "'Omigod!' shrieked Sara, taking a pink tube top emblazoned with a glittery Playboy bunny out of her shopping bag."	page 51: "...I was sick of listening to her hum along to Alicia Keys, and worn out from resisting her efforts to buy me a pink tube top emblazoned with a glittery Playboy bunny."
Sloppy Firsts, page 217: "But then he tapped me on the shoulder, and said something so random that I was afraid he was back on the junk."	page 142: "...he tapped me on the shoulder and said something so random I worried that he needed more expert counseling than I could provide."
Sloppy Firsts, page 46: "He smelled sweet and woodsy, like cedar shavings."	page 147: "...I had even begun to recognize his cologne (sweet and woodsy and spicy, like the sandalwood key chains sold as souvenirs in India.)"
Second Helpings, page 88: "By the way, Marcus wore a T-shirt that said THURSDAY yesterday, and FRIDAY today."	page 170: "He was wearing an old, faded gray sweatshirt that said 'Tuesday' on it. Except that today was Thursday."
Sloppy Firsts, page 209:"Pause. 'So I don't need a ride...' Another pause. 'But do you want one?' he asked. God, did I want one. He knew it, too. He leaned over the front seat and popped open the passenger-side door. 'Come on, I want to talk to you,' he said."	page 172:"Pause. 'So I can't really stay...' Another pause. 'But you want to?' he asked. Did I? Yes... He knew it, too. He patted the chair again. 'Come on, I want to talk to you,' he said."
Sloppy Firsts, page 213: "He was invading my personal space, as I had learned in Psych. class, and I instinctively sunk back into the seat. That just made him move in closer. I was practically one with the leather at this point, and unless I hopped into the backseat, there was nowhere else for me to go."	page 175: "He was definitely invading my personal space, as I had learned in Human Evolution class last summer, and I instinctively backed up till my legs hit the chair I had been sitting in. That just made him move in closer, until the grommets in the leather embossed the backs of my knees, and he finally tilted the book toward me."
Sloppy Firsts, page 223: "Marcus finds me completely nonsexual. No tension to complicate our whatever relationship. I should be relieved."	page 175-176: "Sean only wanted me as a friend. A nonsexual female friend. That was a good thing. There would be no tension to complicate our relationship and my soon-to-be relationship with Jeff Akel. I was relieved."

==== TV interview ====
On April 26, 2006, Viswanathan appeared on NBC's The Today Show with Katie Couric. Viswanathan maintained her innocence, saying that any and all similarities were "completely unconscious and unintentional" and that she must have "internalized [McCafferty's] words," never deliberately meaning to "take any." She maintained, "as I was writing, I genuinely believed that every single word I wrote was my own. I was so surprised and horrified when I found these similarities, when I heard about them over this weekend." Asked about the plot similarities between Opal Mehta and McCafferty's novels, Viswanathan told Couric, "I wrote about what I knew, my personal experiences. I'm an Indian-American girl who got good grades, from New Jersey, who wanted to go to an Ivy League school, and I drew upon my own experiences, upon quirks of the people around me and my culture, to create my character Opal Mehta." Viswanathan stated her intention to put an acknowledgement to McCafferty in the foreword of future printings of Opal Mehta, and said of McCafferty "I hope that she can forgive me for whatever distress I've caused her." Couric then asked, "Do you think that's realistic ... given all the controversy surrounding James Frey and his book ... Or do you think that ... they can forgive and forget?" Viswanathan responded, "I mean, that's what I'd hope that people can do. I hope that people who know me will believe that I'm telling the truth, that I've never been anything less than honest in my entire life, that I'm so horribly sorry for this mistake. But that's all it was, a completely unintentional mistake."

=== Additional accusations ===
==== Salman Rushdie ====
Within days after the story broke, Viswanathan's name became one of the most searched terms at the blog search engine Technorati, and the scandal was a popular topic for commentators at web forums from MetaFilter to Amazon.com and Gawker.com. On May 1, 2006, The New York Times ran a story giving national prominence to claims on the Sepia Mutiny blog that Viswanathan may have lifted text from Salman Rushdie's 1990 novel Haroun and the Sea of Stories, but which also noted that real signs like these are common in India.

Rushdie's Haroun and the Sea of Stories	Viswanathan's Opal Mehta
page 35: Warning reads, "If from speed you get your thrill / take precaution—make your will."	page 118: Poster reads, "If from drink you get your thrill, take precaution—write your will."
page 31: Warning reads, "All the dangerous overtakers / end up safe at undertaker's."	page 119: Poster reads, "All the dangerous drug abusers end up safe as total losers."

==== Sophie Kinsella ====
On May 2, 2006, The New York Times noted "striking similarities" between passages in Opal Mehta and those in Sophie Kinsella's 2003 "chick-lit" novel Can You Keep a Secret?. Viswanathan and Little, Brown declined to comment.

Kinsella's Can You Keep a Secret?	Viswanathan's Opal Mehta
pages 304–5: "a full-scale argument about animal rights ... The mink like being made into coats."	pages 264–5: "a full-fledged debate over animal rights .. The foxes want to be made into scarves."
page 350: "And we'll tell everyone you got your Donna Karan coat from a discount warehouse shop." Jemima gasps. "I didn't!" she says, colour suffusing her cheeks. "You did! I saw the carrier bag," I chime in. "And we'll make it public that your pearls are cultured, not real..." Jemima claps a hand over her mouth... "OK!" says Jemima, practically in tears. "OK! I promise I'll forget all about it. I promise! Just please don't mention the discount warehouse shop. Please."	page 282: "And I'll tell everyone that in eighth grade you used to wear a 'My Little Pony' sweatshirt to school every day," I continued. Priscilla gasped. "I didn't!" she said, her face purpling again. "You did! I even have pictures," I said. "And I'll make it public that you named your dog Pythagoras..."; Priscilla opened her mouth and gave a few soundless gulps... "Okay, fine!" she said in complete consternation. "Fine! I promise I'll do whatever you want. I'll talk to the club manager. Just please don't mention the sweatshirt. Please."

==== Meg Cabot ====
On May 2, 2006, The Harvard Crimson identified passages that Viswanathan had lifted from Meg Cabot's 2000 novel The Princess Diaries. In the same article, Crimson noted that "few—if any—'chick-lit' works have ever received the level of intense scrutiny that 'Opal Mehta' is now enduring, and it is not clear whether the new allegations suggest further plagiarism, or whether Viswanathan is simply employing tropes that are widely-used in the genre."

Cabot's The Princess Diaries	Viswanathan's Opal Mehta
page 127: "Meanwhile, Paulo was picking up chunks of my hair and making this face and going, all sadly, "It must go. It must all go." And it went. All of it. Well, almost all of it. I still have some like bangs and a little fringe in back."	page 57: "The whole time, Frederic (I wondered if anyone dared call him Freddie) kept picking up long strands of my hair and making sad faces. "It must go," he said. "It must all go." And it went. Not all of it, because after four inches vanished, I started making panicked, whimpering sounds that touched even Frederic's heart ..."
page 126: "And it is sort of hard when all these beautiful, fashionable people are telling you how good you'd look in this and how much that would bring out your cheekbones ... And I kept telling myself, She's only doing this because she loves you ..."	page 58: "In my defense, it was hard to be uptight and prickly while surrounded by beautiful, fashionable people all telling me how good I'd look in that shade and what this color would do to enhance my cheekbones."
page 12: "There isn't a single inch of me that hasn't been pinched, cut, filed, painted, sloughed, blown dry, or moisturized. [...] Because I don't look a thing like Mia Thermopolis. Mia Thermopolis never had fingernails. Mia Thermopolis never had blond highlights. Mia Thermopolis never wore makeup or Gucci shoes or Chanel skirts or Christian Dior bras, which by the way don't even come in 32A, which is my size. I don't even know who I am anymore. It certainly isn't Mia Thermopolis. She's turning me into someone else."	page 59: "Every inch of me had been cut, filed, steamed, exfoliated, polished, painted, or moisturized. I didn't look a thing like Opal Mehta. Opal Mehta didn't own five pairs of shoes so expensive they could have been traded in for a small sailboat. She didn't wear makeup or Manolo Blahniks or Chanel sunglasses or Habitual jeans or La Perla bras. She never owned enough cashmere to make her concerned for the future of the Kazakhstani mountain goat population. I was turning into someone else."

==== Tanuja Desai Hidier ====
On April 26, 2006, Viswanathan had told The New York Times, "I've never read a novel with an Indian-American protagonist ... The plot points are reflections of my own experience. I'm an Indian-American." Subsequently, on May 3, 2006, The Harvard Independent noted three passages in Opal Mehta similar to Tanuja Desai Hidier's Born Confused (2002), another young adult novel about an Indian-American teenager in New Jersey. They cited "uncanny resemblance in imagery, sentence structure, and paragraph organization" between the two books. Hidier later stated that she had "ironically" been alerted to the allegations on the day Viswanathan was quoted in The New York Times. Hidier said:

"I was stunned to find two dozen instances of lifting from Born Confused in the Opal Mehta book ... I also drew largely from autobiography to tell the story of my 17-year-old Indian American Jersey girl, Dimple Lala. And I hadn't read any books I could recall with a South Asian American teen protagonist at that point (I wrote Born Confused in 2000/2001 and it launched in 2002). To the best of my knowledge Born Confused was the first book with a US female teen desi heroine; that was one of the reasons my publisher wanted it, and it is certainly one of the reasons I wrote it ... And so I was extremely surprised to find that the majority, though not all, of the passages in Opal Mehta taken from Born Confused are those dealing with descriptions of various aspects of South Asian culture (food, dress, locale, even memories of India, etc.) and the way that culture is expressed in America; essentially every scene of Opal Mehta that deals with any aspect of South Asian culture in more than passing detail has lifted something from Born Confused. One would think that these kinds of cultural details at least could have been drawn from Ms. Viswanathan's personal experience, given our similar cultural backgrounds (and the similar cultural backgrounds and ages of our protagonists)."

An excerpt of Born Confused had appeared in Seventeen magazine in 2002. Hidier was subsequently contacted by Viswanathan's future book packager 17th Street/Alloy, but she declined their offer to collaborate with her on an "Indian-American teen story." Hidier noted in 2006 that "several parts of this excerpt – including the opening and closing – are present and strongly echoed in the Opal Mehta book." She added that Born Confused contained many specific details from her own life which had been recycled by Viswanathan:

"It was a surreal experience for me, looking at these and the other parallel parts side by side. The feeling was almost as if someone had broken into your home – and in some ways this is what literally had happened, considering so much of Born Confused is drawn from my life (and home): The alcohol cabinet in my non-drinking household in small town Massachusetts was now in Opal's, the details of my family's two dinnertimes because of all the years of working late into the night by my father, too; my mother's food, from her mother's recipes, transplanted to Opal's table, her slinky black outfit too; my ecstatic and eye-opening discovery of Jackson Heights, Queens during an enthralled and emotional day there many years ago, suddenly turned to Edison, New Jersey ... Did [Viswanathan and/or Alloy] think you could just substitute one kind of Indian for another? A friend brought my attention to a couple observant bloggers who seemed to have caught on early to this grand error, commenting on how jarring it was to see a Gujarati/Marathi meal on a South Indian table ... and that some of the memories of India hearken back to a much older India in the Opal Mehta book (which makes sense considering the many years that separate Ms. Viswanathan and myself) – details that may have escaped a person not familiar with the culture."

Hidier's Born Confused	Viswanathan's Opal Mehta
page 85: "Finally, I tore open the package they made me save for last. Inside, padded carefully between layers of tissue, was an unbelievably resounding salvar khamees, one of those Indian outfits consisting of loose-fitting pants with a long top and scarf, or dupatta. The deep crimson fabric screamed sanguinely open. A river of nearly neon gold dye wound noisily through its length. The salvar was ornately embroidered with gold and silver and garnet beads and little bells that made a racket even as I lifted it out of the box. All in all it was, in fact, so loud I could hear it. Heavy, too — funny how all those little driblets could add up."	page 125-126: "I looked at the multicolored swirl-patterned box hesitantly. In my past experience, gifts from Edison rarely boded well. And when I tore apart the layers of carefully packed tissue paper, I found an elaborate salwar kameez — loose pants, a long tunic-style top, and a trailing scarf, or dupatta. The salwar was a startling peacock-green, and embroidered so ornately with gold and silver threads and glittering beads that it made my eyes hurt. When I lifted it up, the room resounded to the tinkle of thousands of tiny golden bells. It was surprisingly heavy — all that jigna really added up — and it was the last thing in the world I ever wanted to wear."
page 92-93: "All day the house had smelled of spices, and now before our eyes lay the resulting combustion of all that kitchen chemistry. The feast my mother had conjured up was extravagant, and I realized how hungry I was; I wasn't a big fan of Indian food, at least not on a daily basis, but today the sight of it was pure poetry ... Brown sugar roti and cloud-puff puris just itching to be popped. Coconut rice fluffed up over the silver pot like a sweet-smelling pillow. Samosas transparent, peas bundling just below the surface. Spinach with nymph-finger cloves of garlic that sank like butter on the tongue. A vat of cucumber raita, the two-percent yogurt thickened with sour cream (which my mom added when we had guests, though she denied it when asked; I'd seen the empty carton, not a kitten lick left). And the centerpiece: a deep serving dish of lamb curry, the pieces melting tenderly off the bone."	page 130: "This year, fortunately, there wasn't an egg in sight. Instead, the house had smelled of spices all day, and when we sat down at the dining room table, I nearly combusted at the sight of the extravagant feast my mom had conjured up. Usually I wasn't a big fan of Indian food, but today I was suddenly starving. The table creaked with the weight of crisp, brown rotis and feather-light, puffy puris. A basket of my favorite kheema naan sat beside the clouds of cashew and sultana-studded coconut rice in an enormous pot. There was plump okra fried in oil and garlic till it melted like butter on the tongue, aloo curry studded with peppercorns and glistening chopped chilis, and a crock of raita, a cool, delicious mixture of yogurt and sour cream, bursting with finely chopped onions and cucumbers. The centerpiece was a deep dish of mutton curry, the meat (my mom only used halal bought from an Arab butcher in Edison) already falling off the bone."
page 13: "India. I had few memories of the place, but the ones I held were dream clear: Bathing in a bucket as a little girl. The unnerving richness of buffalo milk drunk from a pewter cup. My Dadaji pouring tea into a saucer so it would cool faster, sipping from the edge of the thin dish, never spilling a drop. A whole host of kitchen gods (looking so at home in the undishwashed unmicrowaved room). Meera Maasi crouching on the floor to sift the stones from rice. Cows huddled in the middle of the vegetable market, sparrows nesting on their backs. Hibiscus so brilliant they look like they'd caught fire. Children with red hair living in tires. A perpetual squint against sun and dust. The most delicious orange soda I've ever drunk — the cap-split hiss, and then the bubbling jetstream down a parched throat."	page 230-231: "I had only a few memories of India; the last time my family visited was six years ago, when I was in the sixth grade….Some impressions stood out sharply in my mind, still as clear as freshly developed Polaroids. I remembered the cold, creamy taste of fresh buffalo milk, Babaji pouring Ovaltine from one tin cup to another until froth bubbled thickly on the surface and it was cool enough to drink. I remembered shooting rockets made of coconut leaves off the rooftop terrace, and watching the beady-eyed green-and-yellow lizards that scuttled over the putty-colored walls after a hard rain. I remembered cold baths from a bucket with a plastic dipper, and sweet, oily badam halva from the nearby Chola hotel. Sometimes I still read the old Enid Blyton books, which were only available in countries of the former British empire. Most of all, I could close my eyes and return to the smells of sun and dust and refuse, mixed with sharp chilis, my grandmother's soft rose talcum powder, and the heady, sweet scent of blossoming hibiscus."

== Fallout and reaction ==
In her initial statement on April 24, 2006, Viswanathan had stated that she and the publisher would be revising the novel for future printings "to eliminate any inappropriate similarities." The same day, Michael Pietsch of Little, Brown stated, "Kaavya Viswanathan is a decent, serious, and incredibly hard-working writer and student, and I am confident that we will learn that any similarities in phrasings were unintentional." He subsequently noted that an acknowledgment to McCafferty would be added to future printings, an intention echoed by Viswanathan in her April 26, 2006 interview with Katie Couric on The Today Show. Little, Brown recalled all copies of Opal Mehta on April 27, 2006. The next day, first edition copies of the novel were priced at $80 on eBay. On May 2, 2006, after further allegations of plagiarism had come to light, Little, Brown released a statement from Pietsch saying, "Little, Brown and Company will not be publishing a revised edition of How Opal Mehta Got Kissed, Got Wild, and Got a Life by Kaavya Viswanathan, nor will we publish the second book under contract." DreamWorks had already halted development of the film adaptation in late April 2006. Harvard University said soon after controversy broke that it would not affect her academic standing there. She graduated with honors in 2008, and subsequently went to Georgetown Law School, from which she graduated in 2011, the same year her parents were killed in a small plane crash in Ohio.

On May 18, 2006, McCafferty noted, "I had heard so much about her book and I had planned on reading it [before the allegations surfaced] ... It was sad and it was a shock that it could happen on such a big scale ... This was a big book that was getting so much attention and publicity. It is the most surreal thing that's ever happened to me." Alerted to the situation two weeks before The Harvard Crimson picked up the story, she stated that "The media broke it and I was sick to my stomach ... People don't know how hard it was to have somebody else take that from me and try and profit. As someone [who has been] writing my entire life, to build my career, it almost made me lose faith in the publishing industry." Though Alloy Entertainment had previously stated that it helped Viswanathan conceptualize the book but did not help with the actual writing, McCafferty also raised the issue of their possible culpability in the scandal. As book packagers sometimes use their own staff or hire freelance writers to ghostwrite manuscripts for publishers, McCafferty asked, "Was it the book packagers who really wrote the book and plagiarized my books or was it her?"

Of Viswanathan being remembered for the scandal, McCafferty also said, "I wouldn't want to be defined by a mistake made in such a public way ... I hope she can move on from this. I hope that for both of us." In addition, she noted that "Books for teens have taken a huge beating in the media" in the aftermath of the incident. "These very elitist comments about 'how all books for teens are crap; so isn't this just crap stealing from crap'. My books are not crap." McCafferty noted that she was insulted by an opinion letter published in The New York Times in which one writer wrote that teen books are "undemanding literature for undemanding readers." "There's so much good writing for teenagers now," she said. "People make across the board judgments."

The reception and fallout from the publication of the novel was discussed by Shaleena Koruth in the 2014 book Postliberalization Indian Novels in English: Politics of Global Reception and Awards.
