= Angels Crest =

- Promotional poster
- Directed by: Gaby Dellal
- Screenplay by: Catherine Trieschmann
- Based on: Angels Crest by Leslie Schwartz
- Produced by: Leslie Cowan; Shirley Vercruysse
- Starring: Thomas Dekker; Lynn Collins; Elizabeth McGovern; Joseph Morgan; Jeremy Piven; Mira Sorvino; Kate Walsh
- Cinematography: David Johnson
- Edited by: Mick Audsley; Giles Bury
- Music by: Stephen Warbeck
- Production companies: Process Film; Process Media
- Distributed by: Entertainment One; Magnolia Pictures
- Release date: December 30, 2011 (US)
- Running time: 92 minutes
- Countries: United States; Canada
- Language: English

Angels Crest is a 2011 American-Canadian independent drama film directed by Gaby Dellal and starring Thomas Dekker, Elizabeth McGovern, Jeremy Piven and Mira Sorvino. The film was adapted from the novel of the same name by Leslie Schwartz. It was marketed in the UK as Abandoned.

== Cast ==
- Thomas Dekker as Ethan
- Lynn Collins as Cindy
- Elizabeth McGovern as Jane
- Joseph Morgan as Rusty
- Jeremy Piven as Jack
- Mira Sorvino as Angie
- Kate Walsh as Roxanne
