= Lucinda Ebersole =

American writer

Lucinda Ebersole (March 12, 1956 – March 20, 2017) was a critic, editor and writer of fiction in the literary scene of Washington, D.C. She is best known for her association with the literary journal Gargoyle Magazine, for which she was co-editor along with Richard Peabody from 1997 to 2017. She also edited various anthologies with Peabody, most notably the various books in their Mondo series. She also wrote an unpublished book entitled Málaga, which she described in 1998 as "a really weird little novel that is sort of 'transgendered' kind of poetry, kind of a novel."

== Works ==
- "Vermont: Home of Lousy Sex", Oyster Boy Review 9
- "Suicide Notebook", Marlboro Review Winter/Spring No. 5
- Janice Eidus; John Kastan, eds. (1998). "Bigger than Jesus". It's only rock and roll: an anthology of rock and roll short stories. David R. Godine Publisher. p. 233. ISBN 978-1-56792-089-5. "lucinda ebersole."
- Death in Equality. St. Martin's Press. 1997. ISBN 978-0-312-15106-5.
- Cookbook of the Day (blog)
- Lucindaville (blog)

=== Editor ===
- Lucinda Ebersole; Richard Peabody, eds. (1993). Mondo Barbie. Macmillan. ISBN 978-0-312-08848-4.
- Lucinda Ebersole; Richard Peabody, eds. (1996). Mondo James Dean: a collection of stories and poems about James Dean. Macmillan. ISBN 978-0-312-14121-9.
- Gore Vidal (2005). Richard Peabody; Lucinda Ebersole (eds.). Conversations with Gore Vidal. University Press of Mississippi. ISBN 978-1-57806-673-5. "lucinda ebersole."
- Lucinda Ebersole, Richard Peabody, ed (1994) Coming to terms: a literary response to abortion, New Press, ISBN 978-1-56584-188-8
