= The Harvard Crimson =

Harvard College undergraduate daily newspaper

- Seal of "The Harvard Crimson"

- Front page of The Harvard Crimson on September 8, 2017
- Type: Student newspaper
- Format: Broadsheet
- School: Harvard University
- Owner(s): The Harvard Crimson, Inc.
- President: E. Matteo Diaz
- Managing editor: Dhruv T. Patel
- Business Manager: L.P. Chavez
- Founded: January 24, 1873; 153 years ago
- Headquarters: Cambridge, Massachusetts, U.S.
- ISSN: 1932-4219
- OCLC number: 6324327
- Website: thecrimson.com

The Harvard Crimson is the student newspaper at Harvard University, an Ivy League university in Cambridge, Massachusetts, United States. The newspaper was founded in January 1873, and is run entirely by Harvard College undergraduate students. It is the oldest continuously published student newspaper in North America, followed by The Queen's Journal, which began publication in October 1873.

== History ==
=== 19th century ===
The Harvard Crimson was one of many college newspapers founded shortly after the end of the American Civil War. The paper describes itself as "the nation's oldest continuously published daily college newspaper", although this description is contested by other college newspapers. The Crimson traces its origin to the first issue of The Magenta, published January 24, 1873, despite strong discouragement from the Dean. The faculty of the College had suspended the existence of several previous student newspapers, including the Collegian, whose motto Dulce et Periculum ("sweet and dangerous") represented the precarious place of the student press at Harvard University in the late 19th century. The Magenta's editors declined Dean Burney's advice and moved forward with a biweekly paper, "a thin layer of editorial content surrounded by an even thinner wrapper of advertising".

The paper changed its name to The Crimson in 1875 when Harvard changed its official color by a vote of the student body—the announcement came with a full-page editorial announcing "magenta is not now, and... never has been, the right color of Harvard." This particular issue, May 21, 1875, also included several reports on athletic events, a concert review, and a call for local shopkeepers to stock the exact shade of crimson ribbon, to avoid "startling variations in the colors worn by Harvard men at the races".

The Crimson included more substance in the 1880s, as the paper's editors were more eager to engage in a quality of journalism like that of muckraking big-city newspapers; it was at this time that the paper moved first from a biweekly to a weekly, and then to a daily in 1885.

=== 20th century ===
The paper flourished at the beginning of the 20th century with the commission of its own building in 1915, located at 14 Plympton Street in Cambridge, which remains the paper's headquarters, and its purchase of Harvard Illustrated Magazine and the establishment of an editorial board in 1911. The Illustrated's editors became Crimson photographers, and thereby established the photographic board. The newspaper's president no longer authored editorials single-handedly, and the paper took stronger editorial positions.

During 1930s and 1940s, reduced financial resources and competition from a publication established by ex-editors represented serious challenges to the Crimson's viability. In 1943, the banner on the paper read Harvard Service News, and the stories focused almost exclusively on Harvard's contribution to World War II. Under the authority of so-called wartime administrative necessity, alumni discouraged the Service News from editorializing. The paper was administered during the war by a board of Harvard University administrators, alumni, and students.

In 1934, The Crimson defended a proposal by Adolf Hitler's press secretary, Ernst F. Sedgwick Hanfstaengl, to donate to Harvard a prize scholarship to enable a Harvard student to attend a Nazi university. The Harvard Corporation voted unanimously to refuse the offer: "We are unwilling to accept a gift from one who has been so closely identified with the leadership of a political party which has inflicted damage on the universities of Germany through measures which have struck at principles we believe to be fundamental to universities throughout the world." The Crimson defended it, "That political theories should prevent a Harvard student from enjoying an opportunity for research in one of the world's greatest cultural centers is most unfortunate and scarcely in line with the liberal traditions of which Harvard is pardonably proud."

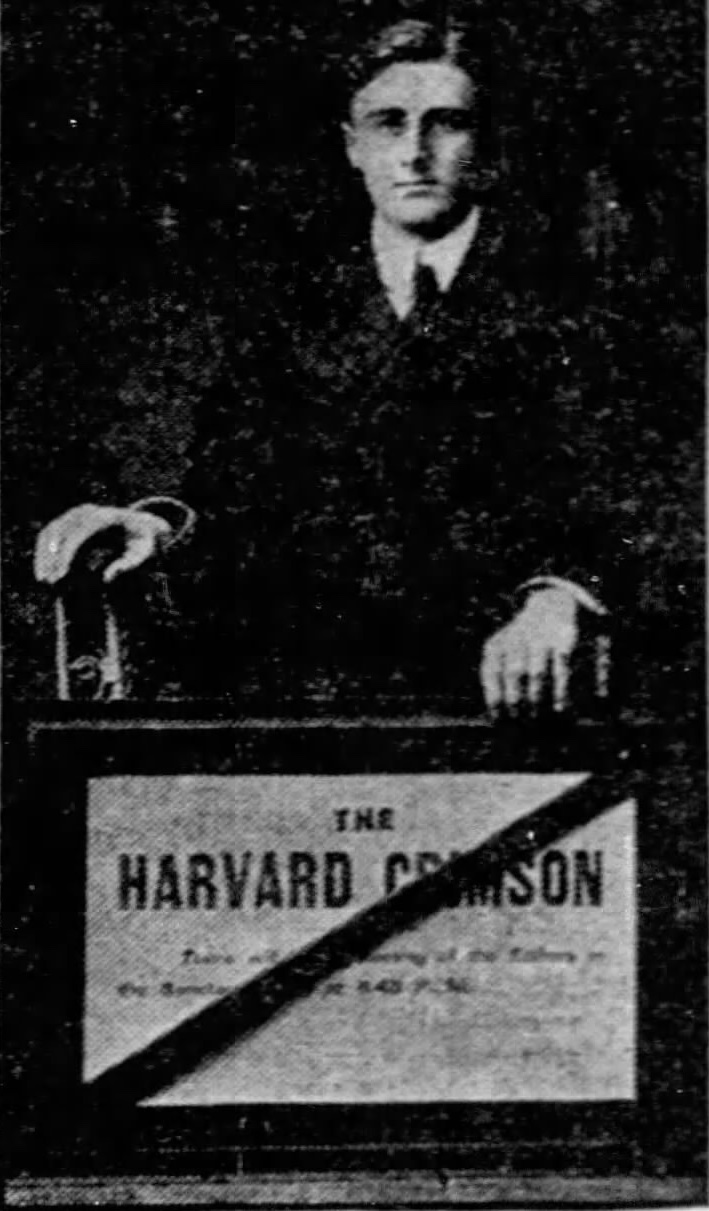
Franklin D. Roosevelt during his tenure as editor

The paper returned to its traditional civilian version in 1946, and it grew larger, more financially secure, more diversified, and began more extensive coverage of the world outside the campus during the early Cold War era.

While financially independent and independent of editorial control by the Harvard University administration, the newspaper remained under the university's administrative control with its student staff subject to university rules and discipline. Radcliffe women on staff were forced to follow curfews to which Harvard men were not subject, and that interfered greatly with the late hours required in producing a newspaper. Throughout the 1950s, The Crimson and various university officials exchanged letters debating these restrictions. Crimson editors pushed for later curfews for their female writers, who grew increasingly involved in the newspaper's daily operations. Under president Phillip Cronin ('53), women became staff members rather than Radcliffe correspondents.

Crimson writers were involved in national issues, especially when anti-communist investigative committees came to Harvard. Future Pulitzer Prize–winning writer Anthony Lukas' stories, including an interview with HUAC witness Wendell H. Furry, were sometimes picked up by the Associated Press. Not even a staff writer yet, Lukas had arrived at the university with Joseph McCarthy's home number in his pocket. His father was an opponent of McCarthy's and a member of the American Jewish Committee, the group that produced Commentary magazine.

In 1966, The Harvard Crimson, Inc. was incorporated as a nonprofit Massachusetts corporation. The incorporation was involuntarily revoked, then revived, in 1986. The paper's key leadership include a president, managing editor, and business manager.

In 1991, student reporters for The Crimson, including Josh Gerstein, who decades later would break the news of the Supreme Court's plan to overturn Roe v. Wade, were the first to break the news that Harvard had selected Neil Rudenstine, then Princeton University's provost, to succeed Derek Bok as the university's president. The reporters, who had learned of a secret meeting in New York City, got their confirmation when they approached a surprised Rudenstine on his plane ride back to Boston. The story appeared in an extra bearing the dateline "Somewhere Over New England".

Throughout the 1990s, there was a great deal of focus on making the staff of the paper more inclusive and diverse. Over time, a financial aid program was instituted to try to address the problem of a lack of socioeconomic diversity. Today, some 90 editors participate in the financial aid program every semester.

=== 21st century ===
Crimson editors repeated their scoop of Harvard's presidency in 2001, beating out national media outlets to report that Lawrence Summers would succeed Rudenstine, and again in 2007, being the first to report Drew Gilpin Faust's ascension to the presidency.

On January 12, 2004, The Crimson printed its first color edition after obtaining and installing four new Goss Community color presses. The date also marked the unveiling of a major redesign of the paper itself.

In 2004, The Crimson filed a lawsuit against Harvard University to force the Harvard University Police Department to release more complete records to the public. The case was heard before the Massachusetts Supreme Judicial Court in November 2005. In January 2006, the court decided the case against The Crimson and in favor of the university.

In November 2005, The Crimson had its records subpoenaed by ConnectU in relation to its lawsuit against Facebook. The Crimson challenged the subpoena, stating that it would not comply with ConnectU's demands for documents.

On April 23, 2006, The Crimson was the first to allege that portions of Harvard student Kaavya Viswanathan's highly publicized debut young adult novel How Opal Mehta Got Kissed, Got Wild, and Got a Life had been plagiarized from two bestselling books by novelist Megan McCafferty. Further allegations were later made that Viswanathan's novel had drawn inappropriately from other novels as well.

In 2019, The Crimson came under fire from some Harvard student groups after an article on a campus protest calling for the abolition of U.S. Immigration and Customs Enforcement. The article included the fact that ICE did not respond to a request for comment, leading to backlash from Harvard student groups who said that reaching out to ICE endangered Harvard students. The Crimson stood by its reporting and received support from journalistic ethics experts.

During the COVID-19 pandemic, The Crimson abruptly switched to an internet-only format in March 2020. Paper editions were later restored during the fall 2021 semester. In July 2022, the paper announced that it was changing from daily to weekly issues that fall as part of a shift to digital-first journalism.

On April 29, 2022, the paper editorialized support for the BDS movement. In a May 1, 2022 editorial, the editors wrote, "We are proud to finally lend our support to both Palestinian liberation and BDS — and we call on everyone to do the same." The paper's editorial board admitted that where it previously held a "skeptical" stance on the matter, it has now shifted to fully supporting the BDS campaign, insisting that, "The weight of this moment — of Israel's human rights and international law violations and of Palestine's cry for freedom — demands this step".

In 2024, The Crimson scooped national outlets to the news that Claudine Gay would be resigning her post after a tumultuous semester in office.

In May 2024, the newspaper announced it has raised $15 million through a capital campaign launched in 2020. The goal was to get $6 million for innovation, $6 million for its financial aid program and $3 million for building renovations, which had not seen a major renovation in 35 years. The funds will be stored in an organizational trust managed by Crimson alumni.

== Building ==
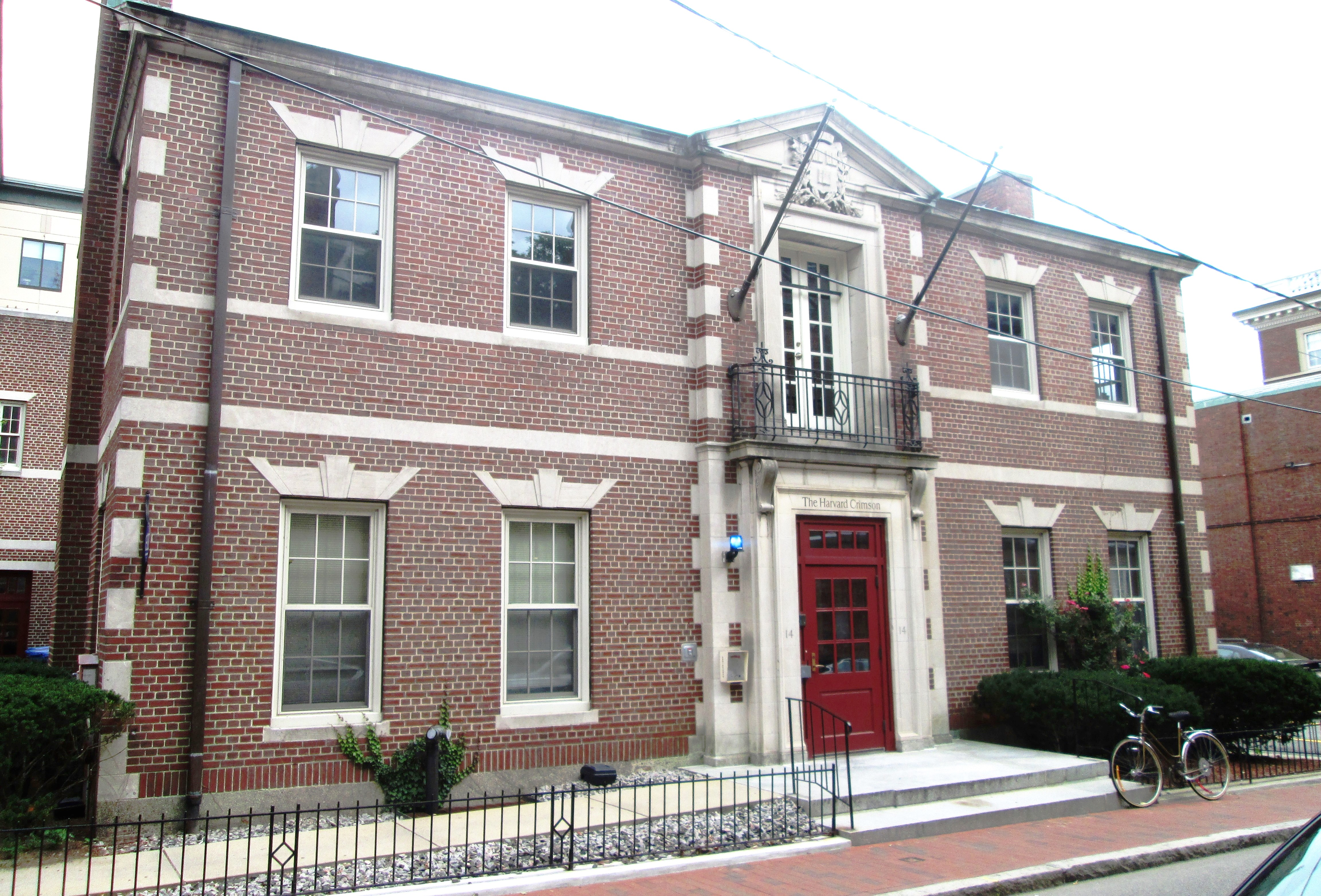
The Harvard Crimson building at 14 Plympton Street in Cambridge, Massachusetts

The Crimson commissioned its headquarters building at 14 Plympton Street in the Harvard Square area in 1915. It was designed by Jardine, Hill & Murdock, and has been called "stolid, institutional and boring. All the things the Crimson isn't."

== Organization ==
The Crimson is composed of 10 boards: Arts, Business, News, Sports, Editorial, Blog, Design, Magazine, Multimedia, and Technology. Any student who volunteers and completes a series of requirements specific to each board known as the "comp" is elected an editor of the newspaper. As such, all staff members of The Crimson, including writers, business staff, photographers, and graphic designers, carry the title of editor. If an editor makes news, they are referred to in the paper's news article as a "Crimson editor", which, though important for transparency, also leads to characterizations such as "former President John F. Kennedy '40, who was also a Crimson editor, ended the Cuban Missile Crisis." Editorial and financial decisions rest in a board of executives, collectively called a "guard", who are chosen for one-year terms each November by the outgoing guard. This process is referred to as the "turkey shoot" or the "shoot". The unsigned opinions of "The Crimson Editorial Board" are decided at triweekly meetings that are open to any Crimson Editorial editor (except those editors who plan to write or edit a news story on the same topic in the future).

The Crimson is one of the only college newspapers in the U.S. that owns its own printing presses. At the beginning of 2004 The Crimson began publishing with a full-color front and back page, in conjunction with the launch of a major redesign. The Crimson no longer prints in-house but used to print over fifteen other publications on its presses.

The Crimson has a rivalry with the Harvard Lampoon, which it refers to in print as a "semi-secret Sorrento Square social organization that used to occasionally publish a so-called humor magazine." The two organizations occupy buildings within less than one block of each other; interaction between their staff has included pranks, vandalism, and romance.

Currently, The Crimson publishes two weekly sections in addition to its regular weekly paper: an Arts section on Tuesdays and a magazine called Fifteen Minutes on Thursdays. Issues of Fifteen Minutes come periodically in the form of glossies.

The Crimson is a nonprofit organization that is independent of the university. All decisions on the content and day-to-day operations of the newspaper are made by undergraduates. The student leaders of the newspaper employ several non-student staff, many of whom have stayed on for many years and have come to be thought of as family members by the students who run the paper.

== Notable former editors ==
Former editors include two U.S. presidents, Franklin D. Roosevelt and John F. Kennedy, and many journalists, government officials, and academics.

== See also ==
- Harvard Law Record, the student newspaper of Harvard Law School
- Secret Court of 1920
- The Harvard Lampoon
