= John Smelcer =

American poet and novelist

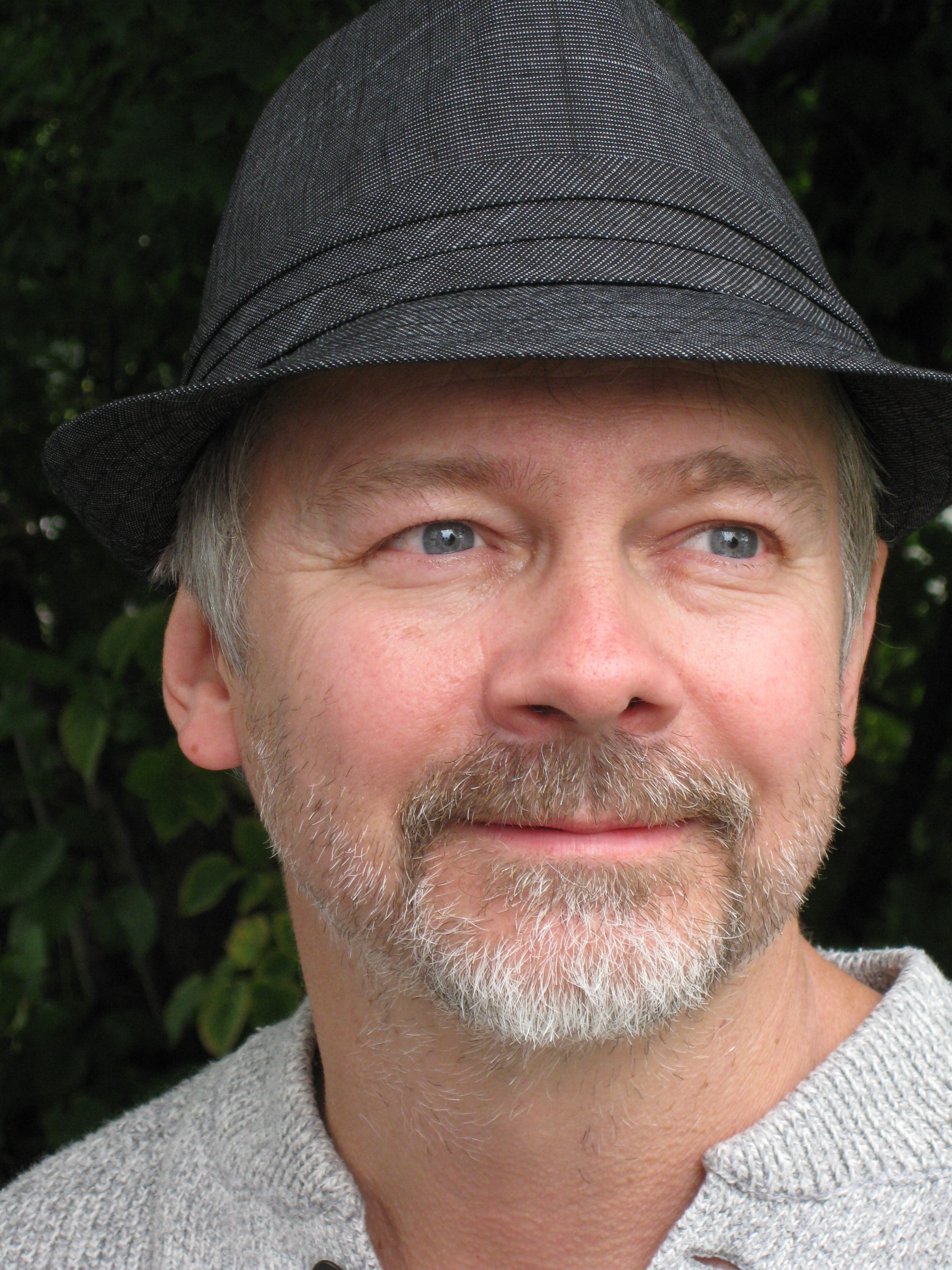
John Smelcer

John Smelcer was an American poet and novelist whose claims to Native American (Ahtna) heritage and citizenship have been the subject of multiple controversies. He died in 2026. https://travis-noe.com/obits/archive/2026/9/26/john-earl-smelcer/

== Background ==
Neither of Smelcer's birth parents is Native American. Smelcer is a shareholder in Ahtna, Incorporated, an Alaska Native Regional Corporation associated with the Ahtna tribe. Based on unique laws in Alaska that allow for non-Natives to join a tribal corporation, he enrolled with the Native Village of Tazlina, located in Tazlina, Alaska. (Note: Native American citizenship criteria can vary widely between tribal nations. Citizenship is based in family, kinship, culture, and an ongoing relationship to tribal lands; often blood quantum is a factor. While some Nations, such as the Cherokee Nation of Oklahoma will enroll descendants with only distant heritage, legitimate tribes almost never enroll non-Natives. The Alaskan situation, however, is the rare exception, as Indigenous peoples are shareholders of one of thirteen Alaska Native Regional Corporations created under the Alaska Native Claims Settlement Act of 1971 (ANCSA) in settlement of aboriginal land claims.)

He is the adopted son of a Native American father.

== Personal life ==
Smelcer is married to Dr. Amber Johnson, Chair of the department of Sociology, Anthropology, and Justice Systems Department at Truman State University.

== Career ==
Smelcer was appointed as a professor at the University of Alaska Anchorage as part of an effort to increase the number of ethnic minority faculty. However, his credibility was subsequently called into question as details of claimed publications in the New Yorker and elsewhere turned out to be incorrect. Smelcer resigned from the university in the midst of its investigation.

Smelcer is the literary editor of Rosebud, a literary journal published in Madison, Wisconsin.

=== Selected works ===
In 2004, Smelcer won a $10,000 James Jones Literary Society First Novel Award to support the writing of his 2007 novel, The Trap. The award was rescinded in 2015 when it was discovered that Smelcer had published an earlier novel under a pen name. The Trap, a young adult novel, was well received. The Wisconsin State Journal called the book a "spare and lyrical" story about a boy and his grandfather facing up to challenges in a remote part of Alaska. Without Reservation (Truman State University Press) won the 2004 Milt Kessler Poetry Book Award given by Binghamton University. Stealing Indians was nominated for a PEN Center USA literary prize. But was subject to some controversy.

== Controversies ==
In 2016, two of Smelcer's poems were published in the Kenyon Review. A backlash among Native American writers led to the journal withdrawing this publication and replacing the poem with a statement from the editor that read in part "these poems contained damaging stereotypes of Native people. I deeply regret the manifest distress this has caused and take full responsibility." First Nation author Terese Marie Mailhot (Seabird Island First Nation) subsequently wrote that "I resent people with dubious stories, who benefit from white privilege and refuse to be accountable to hardworking Natives who have to struggle against oppression and stigma every day."

In 2017, Smelcer's young adult novel Stealing Indians was nominated for a PEN literary award. In response, Nambe Pueblo educator Debbie Reese, among many others, protested at Smelcer's inclusion. Smelcer's nomination was withdrawn. Smelcer was also accused of fabricating a promotional cover quotation for himself, allegedly from Chinua Achebe, calling his book "a masterpiece", as Achebe had died four years prior to his writing his novel. Rich Smith in The Stranger described him as "Native American Literature's living con job," though confirming that Smelcer is an enrolled Tazlina village citizen.
