= Margot Singer =

American short story writer and novelist

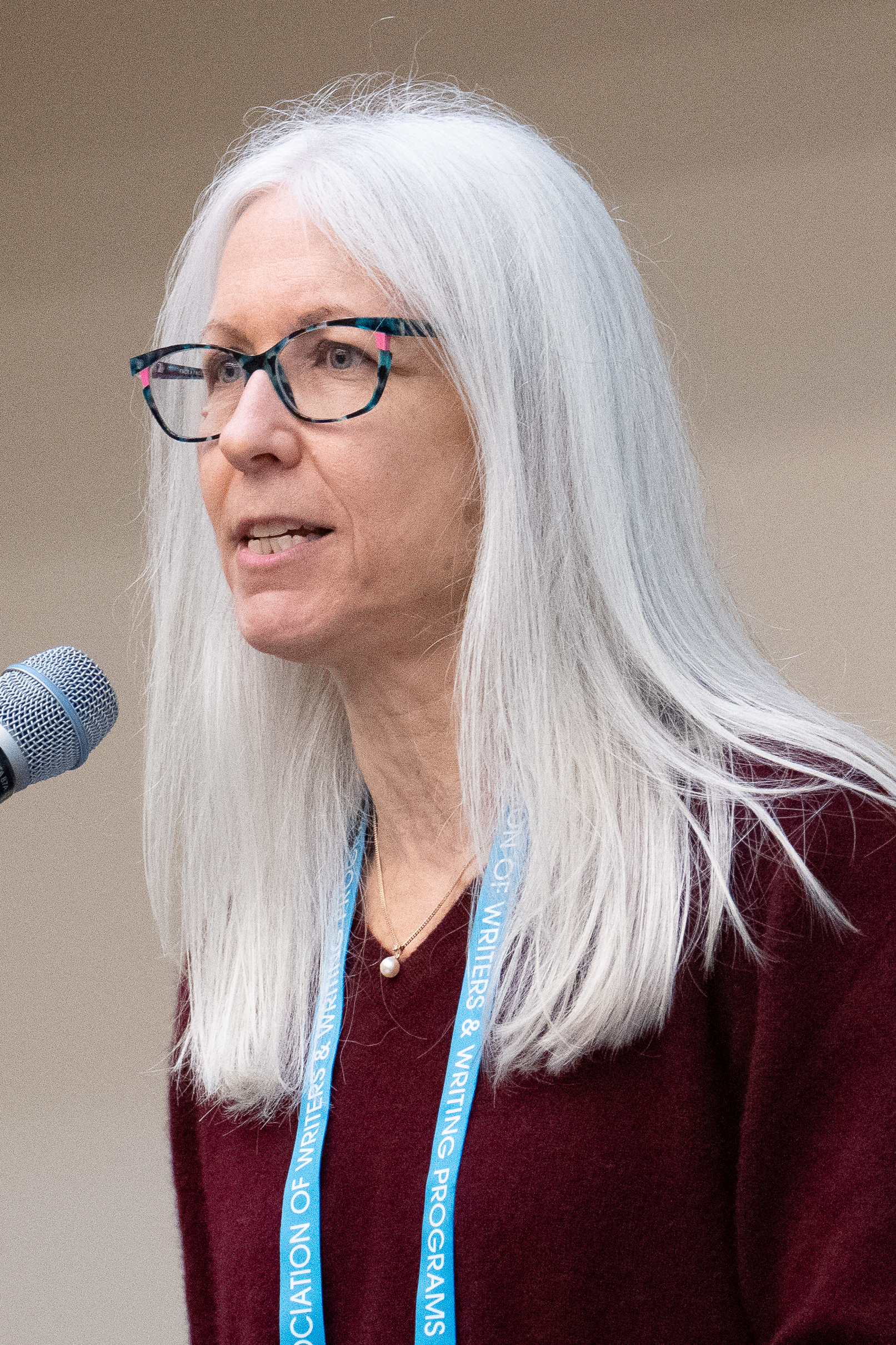
- Singer at AWP 2026
- Education: Harvard University; Oxford University; University of Utah
- Occupations: Short story writer and novelist
- Writing career
- Notable awards: Flannery O'Connor Award for Short Fiction (2006)

Margot Singer (/ˈmɑːrɡoʊ ˈsɪŋər/) is an American short story writer and novelist. Her book The Pale of Settlement won the Flannery O'Connor Award for Short Fiction in 2006 and her novel Underground Fugue was listed as "one of the most anticipated books by women in 2017" by Elle Magazine.

== Biography ==
She graduated from Harvard University for her undergraduate degree, Oxford University with a M.Phil. in 1986 after she was awarded a Marshall Scholarship, and University of Utah with a Ph.D. in 2005.

Singer worked for the management consulting firm McKinsey & Company from 1986 until 1997, where she was a Principal in the New York Office.

She teaches at Denison University in Granville, Ohio.

Her work has appeared Agni, Prairie Schooner, The Gettysburg Review, Shenandoah, The Western Humanities Review, The North American Review, The Sun, among other magazines.

== Awards ==
- Gold Medal, Independent Publishers "IPPY" Book Awards, Essay category, for "Secret Agent Man"
- Ohio Arts Council Individual Excellence Award for Fiction
- Finalist, Sami Rohr Prize for Jewish Literature
- Edward Lewis Wallant Award for Jewish-American Fiction for "Underground Fugue"
- 2006 Flannery O'Connor Award for Short Fiction for The Pale of Settlement
- Glasgow Prize for Emerging Writers for The Pale of Settlement
- Reform Judaism Prize for Jewish Fiction for The Pale of Settlement
- National Endowment for the Arts Fellowship
- Carter Prize for the Essay
- 2013 James Jones Literary Society First Novel Fellowship for The Art of Fugue, later retitled Underground Fugue.

== Works ==
- The Pale of Settlement. University of Georgia Press. 2007. ISBN 978-0-8203-3331-1.
- Bending Genre, co-edited with Nicole Walker, Bloomsbury Academic, 2013 (2nd ed 2023) ISBN 978-1-50138-606-0
- Underground Fugue, Meville House, 2017 ISBN 978-1-61219-628-2
- Secret Agent Man, Barrow Street Press, 2026 ISBN 978-1-96213-107-0
