= Leslie Schwartz =

American writer

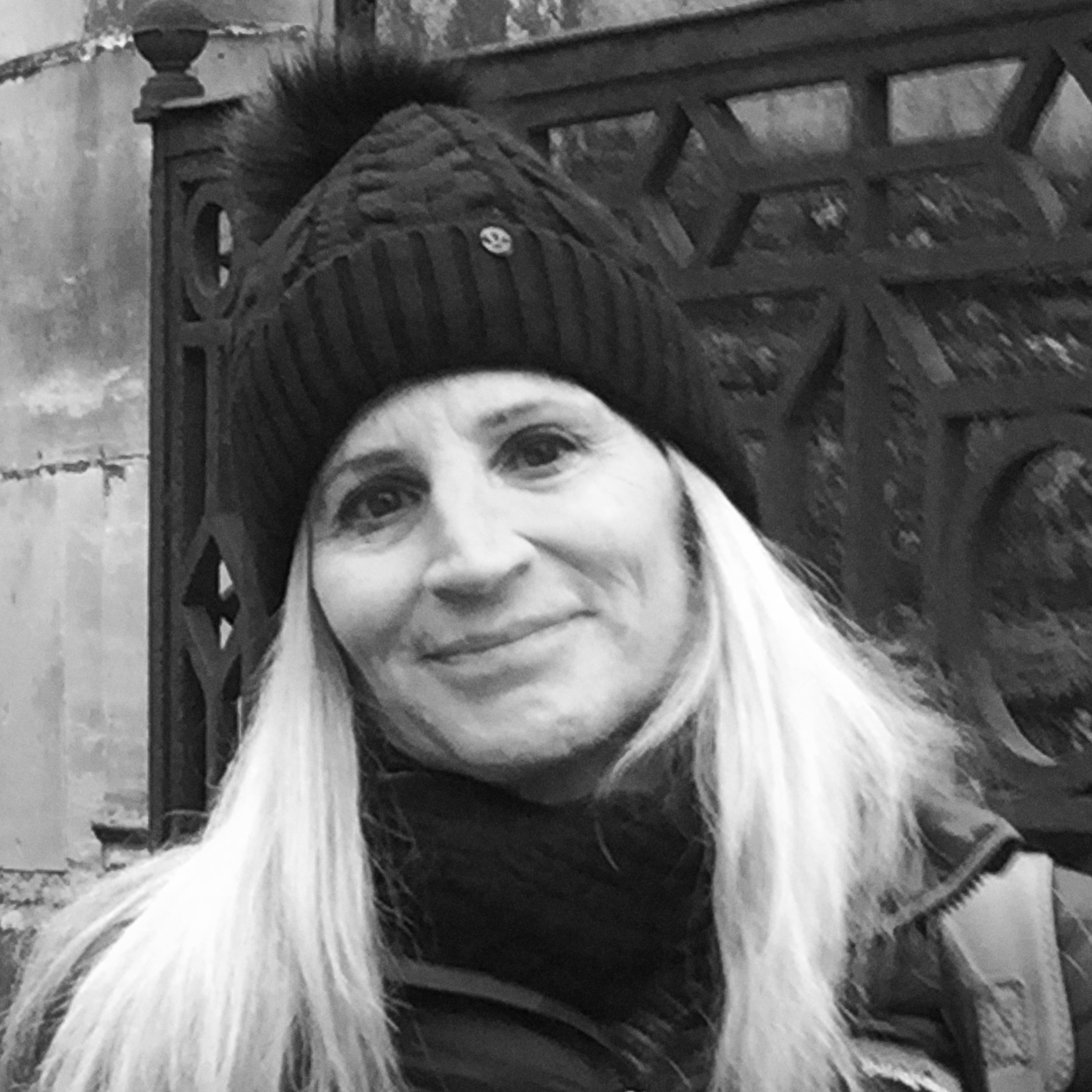
Leslie Schwartz at Père-Lachaise Cemetery in 2018

Leslie Schwartz (born 1962) is an American author and teacher of creative writing. She has published two novels, Jumping the Green and Angels Crest, the latter of which was made into a 2011 film, and The Lost Chapters, a memoir of her time in jail while recovering from alcoholism.

== Personal life ==
Schwartz was born in 1962. She earned a Bachelor of Arts in Rhetoric and English from UC Berkeley and a Master of Fine Arts in Creative Writing in 2012 from Pacific University in Oregon. She lives in Los Angeles with her husband and daughter.

Schwartz is a recovering alcoholic, who began drinking at the age of 11, and became sober in 2000. In 2012, she relapsed, and spent 414 days in what she calls "a chronic state of blackout" from alcohol and drugs, including two near-fatal overdoses and four arrests. This only ended after she was arrested in early 2014 for driving under the influence and battery of an officer. She served 37 days in jail of a 90-day sentence starting in March 2014, and wrote a 2018 book about her experience.

== Writing work ==
Schwartz has taught creative writing at numerous institutions including the UCLA Extension Writers' Program and Jewish Women's Theatre, and continues to teach at the summer writing festival at the University of Iowa. She served as president of the board of directors of PEN Center USA, the Los Angeles literary and human rights organization, from 2006-2007.

=== Homeboy Industries ===
In 2006, as part of PEN, Schwartz was hired through a grant by the California Council for the Humanities to teach a 10-week creative writing class for former Los Angeles gang members at Homeboy Industries, an intervention program founded by Father Gregory Boyle. After the class was over, she stayed on as a volunteer. The Los Angeles Times wrote about her volunteer work.

In 2008, Schwartz became the founder of the Homeboy Press and editor-in-chief of the Homeboy Review literary magazine, which included the former gang members' writing along with that of professionals. The magazine published two annual issues.

== Books ==
=== Jumping the Green ===
In 1997, Schwartz won the $2,500 James Jones Literary Society First Novel Fellowship for her unpublished novel, Jumping the Green, beating out over 500 other applicants. As a result of winning, Schwartz signed a contract with the Elaine Markson Literary Agency in New York. Jumping the Green was published October 1, 1999, by Simon & Schuster, ISBN 0-684-85589-5. It tells the story of a young San Francisco sculptor examining her sister's unsolved murder while being in a sadomasochistic relationship. It was widely reviewed in the United States and the United Kingdom.

=== Angels Crest ===
Angels Crest (Doubleday, ISBN 978-0-385-51185-8) is a 2004 novel about a toddler wandering off in the snowy California mountains, and the aftermath in a small town where nearly everyone has a personal connection to the tragedy. The story is told from seven different points of view. It received mixed reviews, calling it pounding, but also maudlin.

The book was made into a 2011 Canadian-American film of the same title, directed by Gaby Dellal and starring Thomas Dekker, Lynn Collins, and Mira Sorvino. It premiered at the Tribeca Film Festival in April, and was widely released by Magnolia Pictures in December.

=== The Lost Chapters ===
In 2018, Schwartz published her memoir The Lost Chapters: Reclaiming My Life, One Book at a Time (Blue Rider Press, ISBN 978-0525534631) about her 2014 sentence in the Century Regional Detention Facility in Lynwood, California. It juxtaposes her experiences in jail with the 22 books she had sent to her there, each of which seemed to arrive at the most appropriate time. Schwartz especially credits Ruth Ozeki's A Tale for the Time Being for changing her life. The memoir also sympathetically describes the women that she was imprisoned with, and criticizes the cruel and dehumanizing system that incarcerates them without treating them. The book received favorable reviews.
