= Jessica Darling =

Series of young adult novels by Megan McCafferty

- Sloppy Firsts • Second Helpings • Charmed Thirds • Fourth Comings • Perfect Fifths
- Author: Megan McCafferty
- Country: United States
- Language: English
- Genre: Young adult fiction
- Publisher: Three Rivers Press; Crown
- Published: 2001-present
- Media type: Print (paperback and hardcover)

The Jessica Darling books are a New York Times bestselling series of five young adult novels by Megan McCafferty, published between 2001 and 2009. Told from the diary-style perspective of character Jessica Darling, the series chronicles her misadventures through high school, college, and beyond. McCafferty also published a Jessica Darling short story called "Fifteen Going On ..." in a 2004 anthology she edited called Sixteen: Stories About That Sweet and Bitter Birthday.

In 2006, Harvard student Kaavya Viswanathan was accused of plagiarizing the first two Jessica Darling novels in 2006, as well as the works of other writers, in her highly publicized debut novel How Opal Mehta Got Kissed, Got Wild, and Got a Life.

== Novels ==
1. Sloppy Firsts (August 28, 2001)
2. Second Helpings (April 22, 2003)
3. Charmed Thirds (April 11, 2006)
4. Fourth Comings (August 7, 2007)
5. Perfect Fifths (April 14, 2009)

The first two novels in the series, Sloppy Firsts and Second Helpings, were first published in paperback by Three Rivers Press. The subsequent three novels were first published in hardcover by Crown, with later paperback editions by Three Rivers Press.

A prequel series called Jessica Darling’s IT List was released between 2013 and 2015. A film adaptation, Jessica Darling's It List, was released in 2016, starring Chloe East.

== Short story ==
McCafferty published a Jessica Darling short story called "Fifteen Going On ..." in a 2004 anthology called Sixteen: Stories About That Sweet and Bitter Birthday, which she also edited.

== Controversy ==
On April 23, 2006, The Harvard Crimson reported that several portions of Kaavya Viswanathan's highly publicized debut novel How Opal Mehta Got Kissed, Got Wild, and Got a Life appeared to have been plagiarized from Sloppy Firsts and Second Helpings, noting over a dozen similar passages. At the time, Viswanathan's novel had reached 32nd on The New York Times's hardcover fiction bestseller list. McCafferty's third Jessica Darling novel, Charmed Thirds, had just been released a week after Opal Mehta, and was No. 19 on the same list. McCafferty had been made aware of the allegations on April 11, 2006, the same day Charmed Thirds was released and nearly two weeks before the story went public. She later said that reading Viswanathan's book was like "recognizing your own child's face. My own words were just leaping out at me page after page after page."

On April 24, 2006, Little, Brown issued a statement from Viswanathan in which the author admitted to reading McCafferty's novels but stated that any similarities between them and her own work were "completely unintentional and unconscious." The next day, McCafferty's publisher Crown issued a response, calling Viswanathan's statement "deeply troubling and disingenuous" and asserting that her claim "that similarities in her phrasing were 'unconscious' or 'unintentional' is suspect." Noting more than 40 passages from Opal Mehta containing "identical language and/or common scene or dialogue structure" from McCafferty's novels, Crown called the incident "nothing less than an act of literary identity theft" and stated that "Based on the scope and character of the similarities, it is inconceivable that this was a display of youthful innocence or an unconscious or unintentional act." In an April 26, 2006 interview with The New York Times, Viswanathan suggested that some of the plagiarism may have happened because she read both of McCafferty's books multiple times and has a photographic memory. "I remember by reading," she said. "I never take notes." She added "I've never read a novel with an Indian-American protagonist ... The plot points are reflections of my own experience. I'm an Indian-American."

In her initial statement on April 24, 2006, Viswanathan had stated that she and the publisher would be revising her novel for future printings "to eliminate any inappropriate similarities." Little, Brown later noted that an acknowledgment to McCafferty would be added as well, and recalled all copies of Opal Mehta on April 27, 2006. On May 2, 2006, after further reports had come to light alleging that Viswanathan had plagiarized from other sources as well, Little, Brown released a statement saying that they would not be publishing a revised edition of Opal Mehta, or a second book by Viswanathan."

McCafferty noted that "Books for teens have taken a huge beating in the media" in the aftermath of the incident. "These very elitist comments about 'how all books for teens are crap; so isn't this just crap stealing from crap'. My books are not crap." McCafferty noted that she was insulted by an opinion letter published in The New York Times in which one writer wrote that teen books are "undemanding literature for undemanding readers." "There's so much good writing for teenagers now," she said. "People make across the board judgments."
