= Sepia Mutiny =

South Asian diaspora weblog

- Website type: News, blog, discussion forum
- Available in: English
- Owner: Abhi
- Creator: Multiple (group blog)
- Revenue: Not for profit
- Website: sepiamutiny.com
- Commercial: No
- Registration: Optional
- Launched: August 2004
- Current status: Closed on April 1, 2012

Sepia Mutiny was a blog and discussion forum, initially conceived by a group of mostly second generation Indian American students and young professionals in August 2004. The site had had an exponential growth rate and according to its FAQ, as of May 2007 had amassed over five million readers since inception. The majority of the posts on the site were authored by its founding bloggers, though many posts were also authored by "regular contributors." The site also functioned as a public forum on South Asian issues and boasted a wide range of commenters hailing from diverse geographic locations, although predominantly the United States and England. On March 15, 2012, the site announced its closure starting April 1, 2012, citing diversified evolution of blogosphere and personal engagements of its writers as reasons for shutting down.

The title is a pun on the Sepoy Mutiny, or First War of Indian Independence in 1857, a violent widespread movement by sepoys against the British Raj during the latter's imperialist rule in India. Sepia, a shade of brown, was intended as a tongue-in-cheek reference to the tone of South Asian skin.

== Social context ==
Sepia Mutiny discussed issues facing first and second generation immigrants from the Indian subcontinent. The goal of the site was in effect to capture the position of the Indian-American diaspora as it emigrates to foreign nations and primarily North America. Sepia Mutiny had become a focal point of discussion for Desis on the Internet in the United States and, to some extent, other parts of the South Asian diaspora.

Sepia Mutiny's emergence was part of the increase in mainstream diasporic Desi writing and creative arts outside the traditional genres — the effects of which can be seen in Indian subcontinent and spills over to the America, Canada, and the United Kingdom, given the presence of Desis. A similar trend was seen at sites like Badmash, an online comic that gained notice for its Amitabh for President campaign, South Asian magazines such as ABCDlady, as well as the greater prominence of Bollywood films in the United States. Crossovers movies such as Bride and Prejudice, Bollywood/Hollywood and Monsoon Wedding have helped the western audience understand the desi culture. The blog also addressed the growing prominence of South Asian Americans like Bobby Jindal, Russell Peters, Sanjay Gupta, Neel Kashkari and Kal Penn, among others, as they enter the mainstream of American culture.

== South Asians and American politics ==
Part of the focus of Sepia Mutiny was to bring attention to the expanding involvement of South Asian Americans as a political body in the United States, especially in the 2004 and 2006 congressional and presidential elections. A lot of attention was given to the controversy surrounding Virginia United States Senate election, 2006, a scandal that erupted due to comments by former Republican Senator for Virginia, George Allen, in which he used the word macaca to refer to S.R. Sidarth, an Indian American aide working for his opponent's Senatorial campaign. Sepia Mutiny also drew attention to other public figures in America who have used racial slurs against Indians in the past such as Vice-President Joe Biden and major radio personalities in Philadelphia and New York City.

The bloggers at Sepia Mutiny often focused on the emergence of Indian-Americans in the Western political structure. The site served as fertile ground for discussion regarding the actions of these politicians in the United States, ranging from Bobby Jindal to Nikki Haley to Shahid Malik.

== Violence against South Asians ==
Another focus of the blog had been to highlight violence against South Asians — a phenomenon which has become more common since the September 11 attacks on the World Trade Center. The site, however, broadened its awareness of violence beyond simple hate crimes. The recent tragedy at Virginia Tech was discussed from a South Asian perspective with posts about South Asian shooting victims Professor G. V. Loganathan and student Minal "Minu" Panchal, victims the mainstream media failed to talk in depth about. They also were one of the few media sources that addressed the recent assault of a young Indian American National Lawyer's Guild observer Sanjukta Paul during the Los Angeles May Day Mêlée at MacArthur Park by a member of the Los Angeles Police Department.

== South Asian literature, music, and the arts ==
In the spring and summer of 2006, a number of Sepia Mutiny posts debated the allegations of plagiarism in Kaavya Viswanathan's novel, How Opal Mehta Got Kissed, Got Wild, and Got a Life. Posts related to Viswanathan were widely cited by other blogs and the mass-media, including The New York Times and The Washington Post. The site has also highlighted South Asian authors that have come to attention in the United States and abroad, including Booker Prize winners Salman Rushdie and Kiran Desai, and Pulitzer Prize-winning novelist Jhumpa Lahiri.

There was considerable discussion about South Asians in the music industry, ranging from recent Bollywood soundtracks to mainstream Western musicians, such as recent American Idol contestant Sanjaya Malakar. The site also provides coverage of the long history in the music industry of fusing Eastern and Western styles of music, as can be seen through the work of artists like Panjabi MC, Raghav, and Talvin Singh, and unique new niche genres such as Desi Ska and Hindu Rock.

In addition Indian American film and television were highlighted on the blog. Be it mainstream releases to American audiences like Harold and Kumar, Salaam Bombay, and the Elements Trilogy, or lesser known work such as the cult-classic American Desi, Sepia Mutiny bloggers covered it.

== South Asian Americans and the Indian subcontinent ==
In addition to being aware of issues faced by South Asians outside of India, Sepia Mutiny was also cognizant of current events within the subcontinent as well. Many posts discuss current events in India, including controversial topics such as terrorism, communal tensions, AIDS, and even the rapid evolution of the Bollywood film industry. Sepia Mutiny's comprehensive international awareness served to highlight that the changing South Asian culture in the Western world is often mirrored by reciprocal evolution on the Indian subcontinent itself.
