= Mary Kay Zuravleff =

American novelist

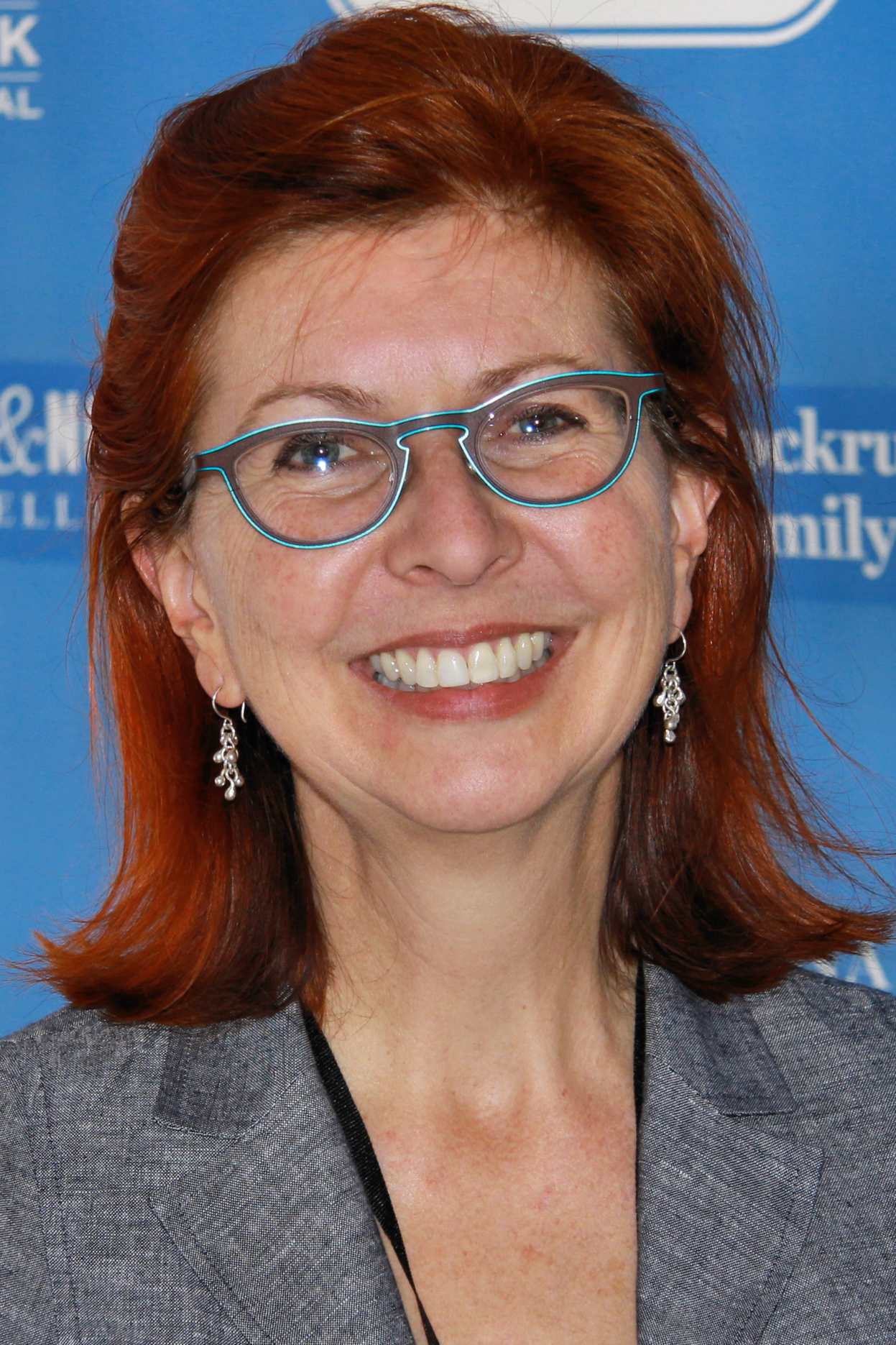
- Mary Kay Zuravleff at the 2013 Texas Book Festival.
- Born: 1960 (age 65–66)
- Education: Rice University; Johns Hopkins University
- Occupation: Professor
- Writing career
- Genre: novel

Mary Kay Zuravleff (born 1960) is an American short story writer and novelist.

== Life ==
She was born in Syracuse, New York. She graduated from Rice University, and from Johns Hopkins University.

She taught at Johns Hopkins University, Goucher College, the University of Maryland, and George Mason University. She was writer in residence at American University. She won the Rosenthal Award of the American Academy of Arts and Letters and the James Jones First Novel Award. She is on the board of the PEN/Faulkner Foundation. She lives in Washington, D.C.

== Works ==
- Man Alive! Farrar, Straus and Giroux. 2013. ISBN 978-0-374-20231-6.
- The Bowl Is Already Broken. Macmillan. 2006. ISBN 978-0-312-42498-5.
- The Frequency of Souls. Macmillan. 2005. ISBN 978-0-312-42485-5.
