= Tanuja Desai Hidier =

American novelist

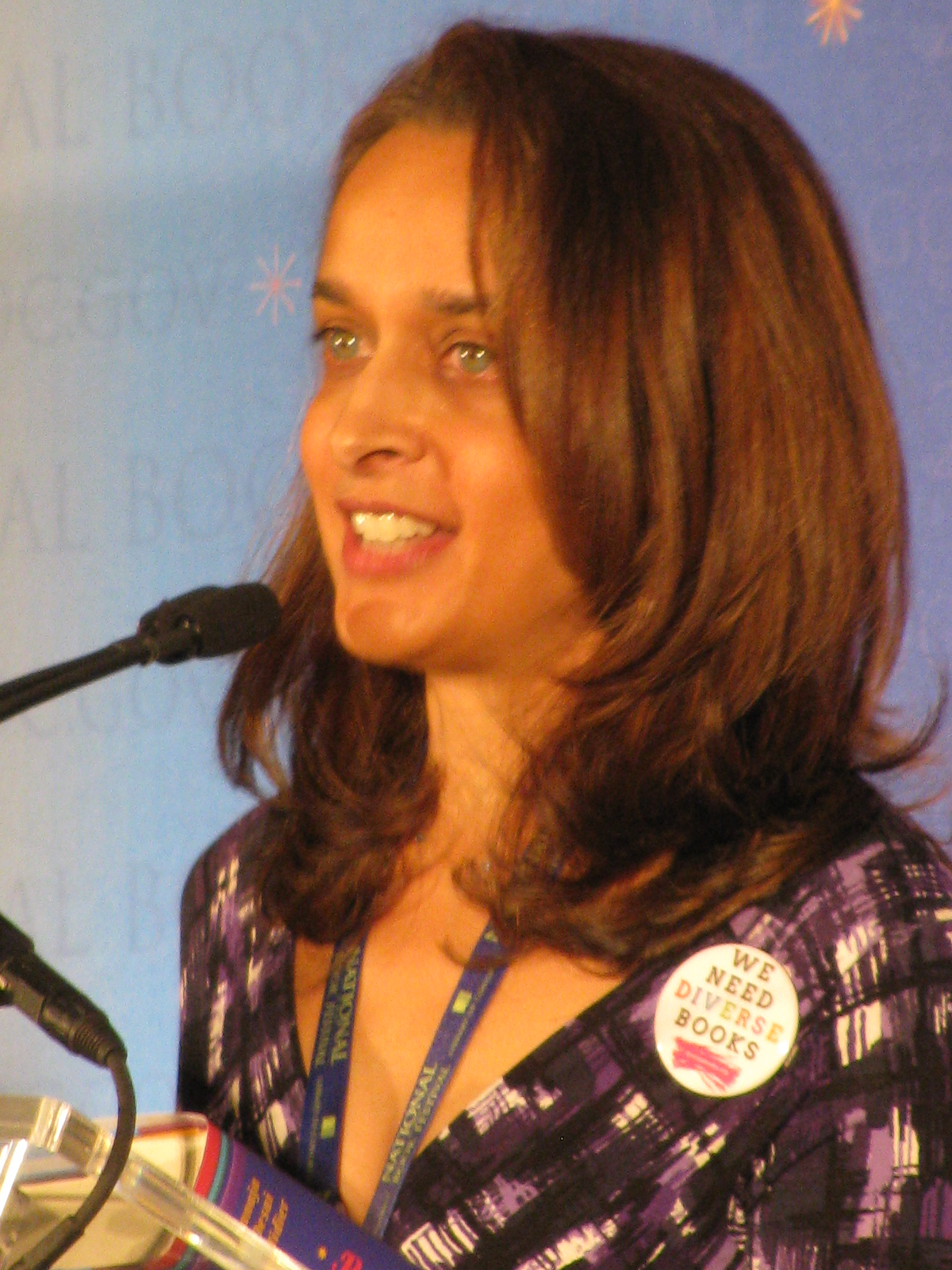
- Hidier at the 2014 National Book Festival
- Born: Wilbraham, Massachusetts, U.S.
- Education: Brown University
- Occupations: Author; singer; song-writer
- Writing career
- Genres: Young adult fiction, realistic fiction
- Notable work: Born Confused
- Notable awards: 1995 James Jones Literary Prize 2003 2003 Best Books for Young Adults
- Website: www.thisistanuja.com

Tanuja Desai Hidier is an Indian-American author and singer/songwriter. She is best known for her 2002 young adult novel Born Confused, and its 2014 sequel Bombay Blues.

== Life ==
Hidier was born in Wilbraham, Massachusetts. Her parents met in when they were both attending medical school in Parel (South Mumbai). Their marriage was intercaste and scandalous for her father's family, though her mother's family accepted the marriage. This marriage was a basis for the parents' marriage in Born Confused.

She graduated from Brown University.

She collaborates with Atom Fellows, in the group T&A.

She lives in London.

== Writing career ==
Her first novel, Born Confused, was released in 2002. The story is a coming-of-age story about an Indian-American teenager named Dimple Lala, and is drawn "largely from autobiography." It is considered to be the first of its kind, a South Asian American novel with an Indian-American protagonist.

== Musical career ==
Hidier wrote and released two "booktracks" to accompany her books; When We Were Twins for Born Confused was released in 2004, and Bombay Spleen followed Bombay Blues in 2014.

== Works ==
- Born Confused, Scholastic Press, 2003, ISBN 9780439510110
  - Karma Girl. E-Books der Verlagsgruppe Random House GmbH. 14 June 2010. ISBN 978-3-641-03971-4.
  - Generazione confusa. Translated by Giancarlo Carlotti. Mondadori. 2004. ISBN 978-88-04-53057-2.
  - Tvära kast, Translated by Tony Manieri, Peder Carlsson, Publisher Damm, 2005, ISBN 9789171302113
- Tale of a Two-Hearted Tiger
- Megan McCafferty, ed. (18 December 2007). "Cowgirls & Indie Boys". Sixteen: Stories About That Sweet and Bitter Birthday. Crown Publishing Group. ISBN 978-0-307-42165-4.
- Bombay Blues, Scholastic Press, 2014

=== Films ===
- The Test (wrote and directed)
- The Assimilation Alphabet (co-wrote and co-directed)

== Awards ==
Hidier is a recipient of the 1995 James Jones Literary Prize for her un-released novelTale of a Two-Hearted Tiger, and received an award for the YALSA 2003 Best Books for Young Adults for her 2002 novel Born Confused. She received the 2015 South Asia Book Award for Bombay Blues.
