= Julia Slavin =

American short story writer and novelist (born 1959)

- Born: 1959 (age 66–67)
- Occupations: Short story writer; novelist
- Writing career
- Notable awards: Rona Jaffe Foundation Writers' Award (2000)

Julia Slavin (born 1959) is an American short story writer and novelist who won the 2000 Rona Jaffe Foundation Writers' Award.

Her work has appeared in Gargoyle Magazine, and Tin House. Her brother is Robert Slavin.

== Works ==
- The Woman Who Cut Off Her Leg at the Maidstone Club and Other Stories Henry Holt, 1999, ISBN 978-0-8050-6085-0; Picador, 2000, ISBN 978-0-312-26413-0
- Carnivore Diet. W. W. Norton & Company. 2005. ISBN 978-0-393-05998-4.

=== Criticism ===
- Julia Slavin (June 18, 2008). "Bursts of Laughter". The Washington Post.

== Reviews ==
- LISA ZEIDNER (August 28, 2005). "'Carnivore Diet': What Rough Beast". The New York Times.
- "CARNIVORE DIET, By Julia Slavin". Kirkus Reviews. April 15, 2005.
- MICHAEL PAKENHAM (July 25, 1999). "Debut stories by Julia Slavin: deliciously insane domesticity". The Baltimore Sun.
- Judy Budnitz (July 27, 1999). "Suburban Blight". The Village Voice. Archived from the original on June 29, 2011.
