= Jody Mussoff =

American ceramist and artist

- Born: 1952 (age 73–74); Pittsburgh, Pennsylvania, U.S.
- Education: Carnegie-Mellon University; Corcoran College of Art and Design
- Known for: ceramic arts

Jody Mussoff (born 1952 in Pittsburgh, Pennsylvania) is an American ceramist and artist, living in Virginia.

== Biography ==
Mussoff was born in 1952 in Pittsburgh, Pennsylvania. She received her art training at Carnegie-Mellon University and the Corcoran College of Art and Design. Her work was included in the exhibition Graphic Masters III, held at the Smithsonian Institution's American Art Museum in 2010.

== Work ==
Mussoff's brightly colored drawings represent people and animals from her imagination. She uses a cross-hatching technique, and leaves much of the background blank. Her ceramics are earthenware, also brightly colored, decorated with people and animals. There is humor and a surrealistic quality to her drawings and ceramics. In 2025 her work was included in the major 19-venue survey exhibition "Women Artists of the DMV", curated by F. Lennox Campello.

=== Critical reception ===
Mossoff's drawings have been described by The Washington Post as "technically brilliant", while The Orlando Sentinel observed that her drawing's richly colored skin again stands out, although here to more quirkily psychological effect."

The Baltimore Sun described her drawings as having a "degree of understated humor that keeps the message from becoming heavy-handed."

== Collections ==
Mussoff's work is in the collection of the National Gallery of Art's Corcoran Collection, the Hirshhorn Museum and Sculpture Garden, the Princeton University Art Museum Smithsonian American Art Museum, University of Maryland, the Pennsylvania Academy of the Fine Arts Yale University Art Gallery, the National Museum of Women in the Arts, the Kunsthalle Nürnberg, and the Tokyo National University of Fine Arts.

Mussoff is listed in major artist databases.
