= Megan McCafferty =

American author (born 1973)

- Born: Megan Fitzmorris; 1973 (age 52–53); New Jersey
- Education: Columbia University
- Occupation: Novelist
- Writing career
- Period: 2001–present
- Genre: Young adult fiction
- Website: meganmccafferty.com

Megan Fitzmorris McCafferty (born 1973) is an American author known for The New York Times bestselling Jessica Darling series of young adult novels published between 2001 and 2009. McCafferty gained international attention in 2006 when novelist Kaavya Viswanathan was accused of plagiarizing the first two Jessica Darling novels.

== Early life ==
McCafferty hails from the Bayville section of Berkeley Township, New Jersey, and moved to Brooklyn and Manhattan before settling in Princeton, New Jersey. She graduated from Central Regional High School in Berkeley Township, New Jersey in 1991. McCafferty attended the University of Richmond before transferring to Columbia University to earn a bachelor's degree in English. After graduation, McCafferty worked in magazine publishing as an editor for Cosmopolitan, YM, and Fitness magazines. She began her writing career with writing short stories and articles for various teen magazines.

== Jessica Darling series ==
McCafferty's first novel, Sloppy Firsts, was published on August 28, 2001. Told from the diary-style perspective of character Jessica Darling herself, the series chronicles her misadventures through high school, college, and beyond. McCafferty subsequently published Second Helpings on April 22, 2003. This was later followed by Charmed Thirds (April 11, 2006), Fourth Comings (August 7, 2007), and Perfect Fifths (April 14, 2009). Perfect Fifths, the fifth and final Jessica Darling novel, is the only book in the series told in third person from the alternating perspectives of Jessica Darling and her long-time love, Marcus Flutie. The third, fourth and fifth books all made the New York Times Best Seller List. A Sloppy Firsts stage play inspired by the first book in the series premiered at Round House Theater in March 2018.

McCafferty also published a Jessica Darling short story called "Fifteen Going On ..." in a May 25, 2004 anthology called Sixteen: Stories About That Sweet and Bitter Birthday, which she also edited.

McCafferty announced in 2012 that she would be publishing a new Jessica Darling prequel series titled It List, aimed at middle-grade readers. The first of the novels, Jessica Darling's It List #1: The (Totally Not) Guaranteed Guide to Popularity, Prettiness & Perfection was published on September 3, 2013. The sequels Jessica Darling's It List #2: The (Totally Not) Guaranteed Guide to Friends, Foes & Foe Friends and Jessica Darling's It List #3: The (Totally Not) Guaranteed Guide to Stressing, Obsessing and Second Guessing were published in September 2014 and June 2015. In June 2016 MarVista Entertainment released Jessica Darling's It List, a digital film based on the first book in the series.

In 2006, Harvard student and novelist Kaavya Viswanathan was accused of plagiarizing from Sloppy Firsts and Second Helpings in her novel How Opal Mehta Got Kissed, Got Wild, and Got a Life.

== Other works ==
McCafferty published Bumped, a dystopian young-adult novel, on April 26, 2011. Its sequel Thumped was published on April 24, 2012. She published a middle-grade novel, True to Your Selfie (Scholastic), about two 12-year-old best friends and social media influencers, on February 4, 2020. Her realistic historical fiction young adult novel The Mall (Wednesday Books), set in the early 1990s, was published on July 28, 2020.

She has also contributed to several fiction and nonfiction anthologies. Her work has been translated into eleven languages including Bulgarian, Chinese and German and has been awarded numerous honors by such associations as the American Library Association and the New York Public Library. McCafferty at one time kept what she termed a "retro(blog)" on her website in which she posted actual journal entries and creative writing from her adolescence.

1. Girls' Night In, edited by Lauren Henderson, Chris Manby and Sarah Mlynowski
2. It's a Wonderful Lie: 26 Truths About Life in Your Twenties, edited by Emily Franklin
3. Everything I Needed To Know About Being a Girl I Learned From Judy Blume, edited by Jennifer O'Connell
4. If I'd Known Then: Women in Their 20s and 30s Write Letters to Their Younger Selves, edited by Ellyn Spragins
5. A New Dawn: Your Favorite Authors on Stephenie Meyer's Twilight Series, edited by Ellen Hopkins
6. Does This Book Make Me Look Fat? Stories about loving—and loathing—your body, edited by Marissa Walsh
7. My Little Red Book, edited by Rachel Kauder Nalebuff
