= Andrew J. Porter =

American short story writer

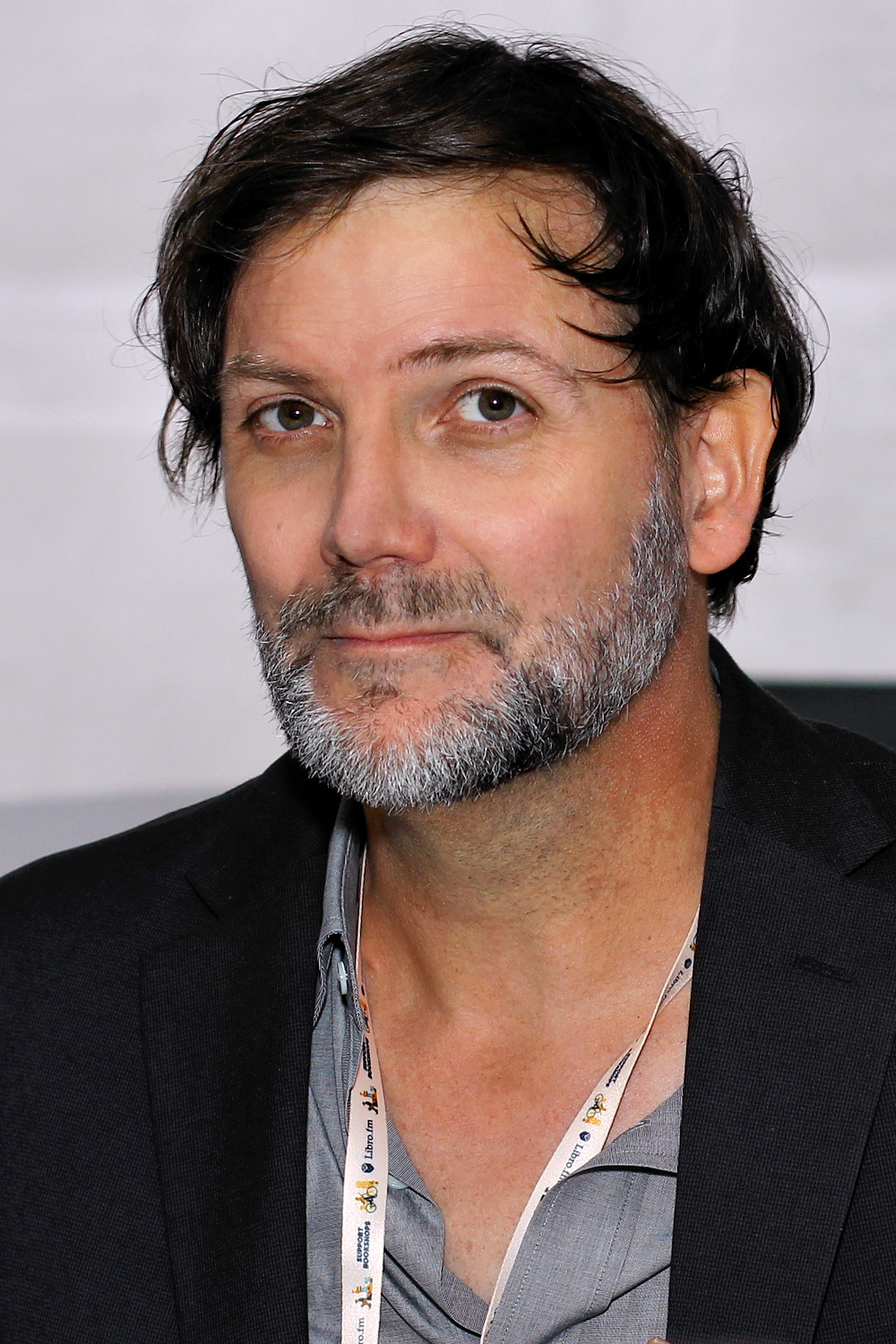
- Porter at the 2023 Texas Book Festival
- Born: Lancaster, Pennsylvania, U.S.
- Education: Vassar College; Iowa Writers' Workshop
- Occupation: Short story writer
- Writing career
- Notable awards: Flannery O'Connor Award for Short Fiction (2007); Pushcart Prize
- Website: www.andrewporterwriter.com

Andrew J. Porter is an American short story writer and novelist. He has written multiple short story collections and novels and has received multiple awards, including winning the Flannery O'Connor Award for Short Fiction in 2008 for his debut collection The Theory of Life and Matter.

== Life ==
Porter was born in Lancaster, Pennsylvania. He graduated from Vassar College, and the Iowa Writers' Workshop. Currently, Porter lives in San Antonio, Texas, where he is a Professor of English at Trinity University and Director of the Creative Writing Program.

His debut short story collection, The Theory of Light and Matter, won the 2007 Flannery O'Connor Award for Short Fiction and was republished in 2010 by Vintage Books/Random House. He is also the author of the novel In Between Days (Alfred A. Knopf, 2012), which was a Barnes & Noble “Discover Great New Writers” selection, an IndieBound “Indie Next” selection, and the San Antonio Express-News’s “Fictional Work of the Year,” the short story collection The Disappeared (Alfred A. Knopf, 2025), which was longlisted for The Story Prize and the Joyce Carol Oates Prize, the novel The Imagined Life (Alfred A. Knopf, 2027), which was longlisted for the Andrew Carnegie Medal for Excellence in Fiction, the Joyce Carol Oates Prize, and the Mark Twain American Voice in Literature Award, was a finalist for the Lattes Grinzane Book Prize for International Fiction, and was selected as one of the “Best Books of the Year” by NPR, The New Yorker, and Esquire. His most recent short story collection, The Letters, is forthcoming from Alfred A. Knopf in 2027. His work has appeared in publications such as The Best American Short Stories, One Story, Ploughshares, The Threepenny Review, The Southern Review, Texas Monthly, The Wall Street Journal, Epoch, Narrative Magazine, American Short Fiction, The Missouri Review, Alaska Quarterly Review, Prairie Schooner, StoryQuarterly, Colorado Review, Story, Electric Literature, and The Pushcart Prize Anthology. He appeared on NPR's Selected Shorts. His short stories have been awarded a Pushcart Prize and been selected multiple times as one of the Distinguished Stories of the Year by Best American Short Stories. Over 25 international editions of Porter’s books have been published in various countries, including translations and foreign editions in France, Italy, Spain, The Netherlands, Korea, Bulgaria, Argentina, Australia, New Zealand, and The United Kingdom.

== Awards ==
- Joyce Carol Oates Literary Prize (2026) (longlist)
- Andrew Carnegie Medal for Excellence in Fiction (2025) (longlist)
- Mark Twain American Voice in Literature Award (2026) (longlist)
- Lattes Grinzane Prizee for International Fiction (2026) (longlist)
- Joyce Carol Oates Literary Prize (2024) (longlist)
- The Story Prize (2023) (longlist)
- Flannery O'Connor Award (2008) (winner)
- William Saroyan International Prize for Writing at Stanford University (shortlist)
- Frank O'Connor International Short Story Award (finalist)
- George A and Eliza Gardner Howard Foundation Award at Brown University (finalist)
- Foreword Magazine Book of the Year Award (2008)
- W.K. Rose Fellowship in the Creative Arts from Vassar College (2004)
- James Michener-Paul Engle Fellowship from the James Michener/Copernicus Society of America
- Emerging Writer Award from Drake University
- Barnes & Noble Discover Great New Writers Selection
- San Antonio Express-News's Fictional Work of the Year (2012)
- Iowa Teaching/Writing Fellowship from the University of Iowa
- Tennessee Williams Scholarship from the Sewanee' Writers' Conference
- Residency Fellowship from the Helene Wurlitzer Foundation
- Pushcart Prize
- Best American Short Stories (2025)
- The Patterson Prize (finalist)
- Steven Turner Award (finalist)
- Glenna Luschei Award
- Discoveries selection by The Los Angeles Times
- Indiebound Indie Next selection
- Artist Foundation of San Antonio Literary Arts Award (2008)

== Works ==
- The Letters Alfred A. Knopf (2027)
- The Imagined Life Alfred A. Knopf (2025)
- The Disappeared Alfred A. Knopf (2023)
- In Between Days published in 2012 by Alfred A. Knopf/Random House
- The Theory of Light and Matter published in 2008 by the University of Georgia Press. In 2010, it was republished in paperback by Vintage Books/Penguin Random House
