= Iheoma Nwachukwu =

Nigerian-American writer

Iheoma Nwachukwu is a Nigerian fiction writer and poet based in Collegeville, Pennsylvania. He is an Associate Professor of Creative Writing at Eastern University, in St Davids. He is the author of the short story collection, Japa and Other Stories, which won the Flannery O'Connor Award for Short Fiction. In 2025, Japa and Other Stories was a finalist for the PEN/ Robert W. Bingham Prize.

== Early life and education ==
Nwachukwu was born in Lagos. He earned his bachelor's degree in Biochemistry at the University of Calabar in 2002. After working at his father's advertising company and playing professional chess, he received a Bard College Chinua Achebe Center Fellowship in 2010, in

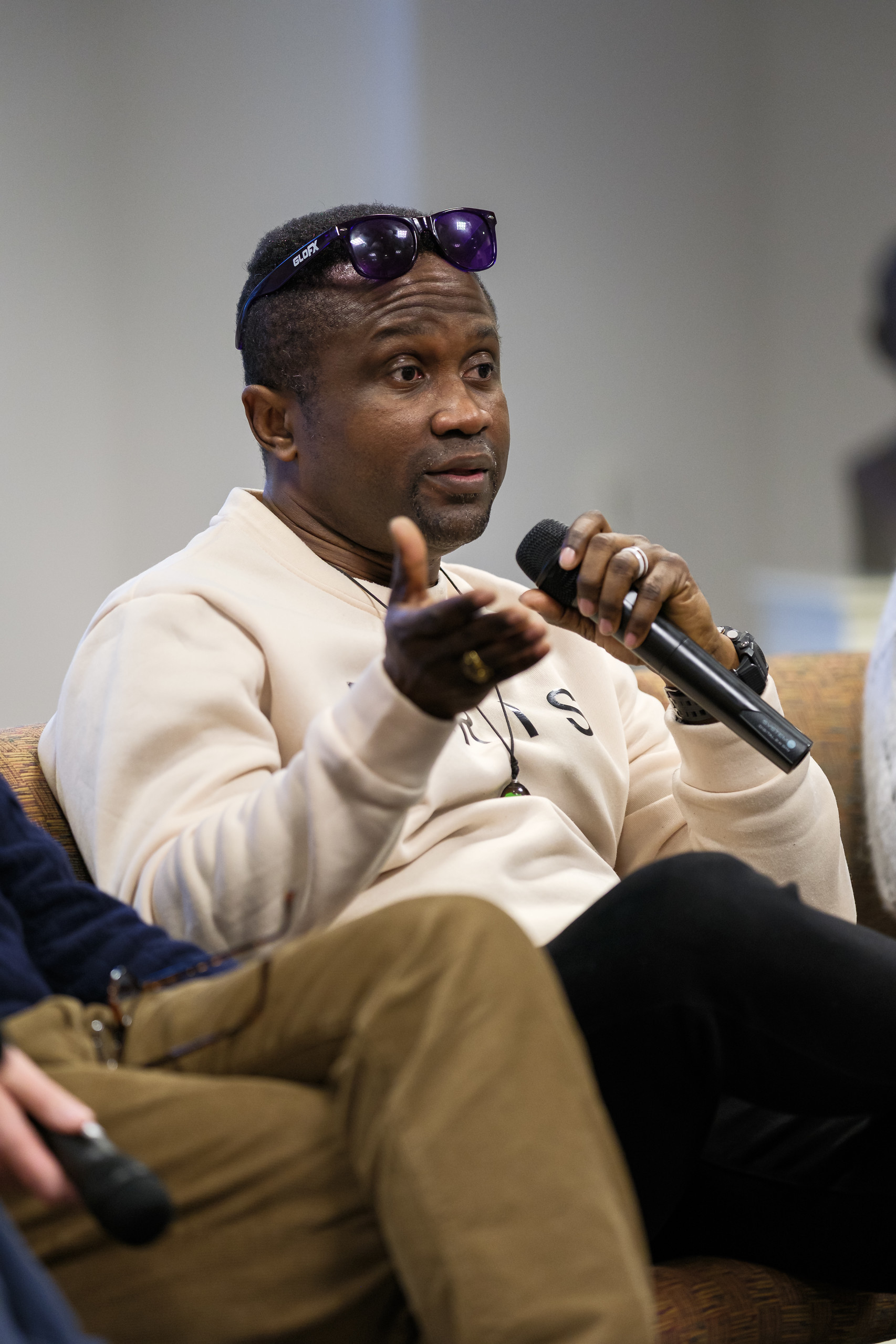
Nwachukwu at WRA literary festival

2011 a Michener Center Fellowship, and in 2023, a Mississippi Arts Commission Literary Artist Fellowship. He earned an MFA from the Michener Center, University of Texas at Austin, in 2014. He went on to earn a PhD in English and Creative Writing from Florida State University in 2018, with a minor in African Literature.

== Career ==
Nwachukwu is the author of the short story collection, Japa and Other Stories, which won the 2023 Flannery O'Connor Award for Short Fiction, and was a finalist for the PEN/Robert W. Bingham Prize. The book received coverage from The New York Review of Books, The Lagos Review, Business Day, Foreword Reviews, FSU News, The Sun Nigeria, and the Italian Internazionale.

His fiction has appeared in Ploughshares, Swamp Pink, New England Review, The Iowa Review, The Southern Review, Oxford American, AGNI, The Colorado Review, Internazionale, and elsewhere.

His poetry has appeared in Prism International, Bare Life Review, Forklift Ohio, and other places.

His nonfiction has appeared in The Kenyon Review, Lithub, AGNI, Electric Literature, and other outlets.

He has given readings and participated in panels at SXSW, Harry Ransom Center, WFSU News, Word of South Festival, Internazionale a Ferrara, Zora Neale Hurston Festival. He has been interviewed in Poets & Writers Grants & Awards: The Writing Contest Newsletter, Mississippi Arts Hour Interview, The Rumpus, ZYZZYVA, Michigan State University, Totally Booked Podcast with Zibby.

In 2024, Nwachukwu served as a grant panelist for the Mississippi Arts Commission Literary Fellowship. In 2025 he served as a judge for the Flannery O'Connor Award for Short Fiction, and the Neustadt International Prize for Literature.
