= Left Bank Books (St. Louis) =

Independent bookstore in St. Louis, Missouri

Coordinates: 38.648588°N 90.260990°W

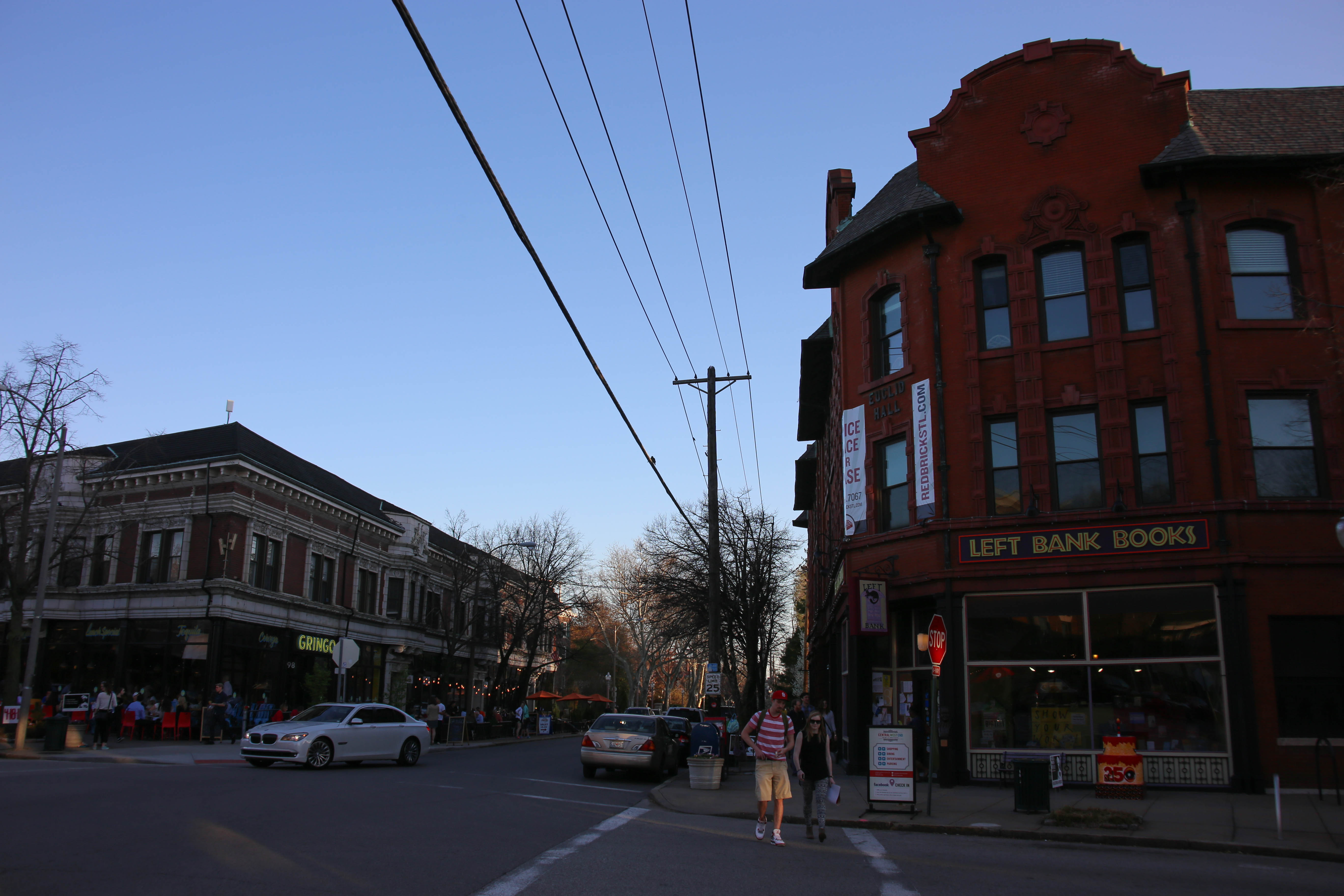
- Industry: Specialty retail
- Founded: 1969
- Founder: Kris Kleindienst
- Headquarters: St. Louis, Missouri, United States
- Number of locations: 1 store
- Area served: St. Louis metropolitan area
- Products: New, used, and rare books
- Owners: Kris Kleindienst
- Number of employees: about 20
- Website: www.left-bank.com

Left Bank Books is an independent bookstore located at 399 N. Euclid Street in the Central West End neighborhood of St. Louis, Missouri. It is the oldest independently operated bookstore in St. Louis. It was founded by students in 1969 as a leftist collective to sell underground, counter-cultural, feminist, and anti-establishment books, newspapers, and magazines—the first to do so in the St. Louis region. It was the first bookstore with its name in the United States, and the first exhibiting gallery for children's book illustrator Mary Engelbreit. Left Bank Books sponsors reading groups, book signings, author appearances, and community literary activities. In 2015 The Washington Post named it one of the best bookstores in the United States and in 2017 Real Simple magazine has called Left Bank Books the best bookstore in the state of Missouri.

== History and description ==
Left Bank Books was founded by a group of Washington University in St. Louis graduate students in July 1969. It was run as a leftist collective to provide alternative literature and protest the Vietnam War. At the time, the store was one of the only places to purchase leftist, feminist, alternative, and counter-culture publications and writings in the Midwest. The store carried (then controversial) publications such as Rolling Stone magazine. The store developed one of the first Feminist/Women's studies and Gay and lesbian studies book sections in the area.

The store's original location was on Skinker Blvd., before it relocated to Delmar Blvd. in the Delmar Loop, near Washington University. In 1977, the store moved to 399 N. Euclid Street in the Central West End neighborhood. From December 2008 to May 2014 Left Bank Books operated a second store at 321 North 10th Street in St. Louis. In 1994 Left Bank Books opened a coffee shop next to the Central West End store. In 1998, Left Bank Books was a plaintiff in an antitrust lawsuit by the American Booksellers Association against national chain bookstores Borders and Barnes & Noble. The lawsuit alleged the large chains were using their market power to obtain special deals from book publishers (including publisher discounts, selective payment terms, and special book return arrangements) that were unavailable to small booksellers. The lawsuit was settled in 2001 for $4.7 million.

Over its history, Left Bank Books has been home to several cats. The first was Captain Nemo, who was rescued from drowning and nursed back to health by the store owners. After his death, the store became home to Jamaica, named by customers after author Jamaica Kincaid. Jamaica (the cat) died in April 2005. She was succeeded by Spike. Spike is mentioned in Emily Giffin's book Where We Belong. In 2012, Spike was named "Bookstore Cat of the Year" at Book Expo America. In that same year, the website Mental Floss named Spike one of "10 Excellent Bookstore Cats". The store's current cat, Orleans, moved in in 2022. He is a beautiful, sweet boy with long black hair. He is not a huge fan of being petted by strangers, but he's always willing to play. His weaknesses include feather toys and catnip.

In 2022, owner Kris Kleindienst received the Voice of the Heartlands award by the Midwest Independent Bookstore Association, awarded each year to individuals and organizations who uphold the value of independent bookselling and who have made a significant contribution to bookselling in the Midwestern United States. In 2024, Kleindienst received the Michele Karlsberg Leadership Award from the Publishing Triangle.

== Activities and events ==
=== Author book signings ===
Left Bank Books currently presents 250 author events a year. Hosted authors have included U.S. Senator and presidential candidate Hillary Clinton, former U.S. President Jimmy Carter, feminist writer and activist Gloria Steinem, humorist David Sedaris, poet Allen Ginsberg, author Toni Morrison, chef Rick Bayless, poet Anne Lamott, poet William Gass, sci-fi author Ann Leckie, graphic artist Alison Bechdel, and writer-activist Sarah Schulman. In 1999, the store refused to host former Secretary of State Henry Kissinger for a book signing due to his role in the Vietnam War.

=== Art gallery ===
For many years, Left Bank Books maintained an art gallery in the lower level of its Euclid Street location that exhibited artists before they were more widely recognized. The gallery mounted eight-to-nine exhibits per year. Many of the exhibited artists created works, announcements, and posters naming Left Bank Books.

Left Bank Books was the first and, for a time, exclusive exhibiting gallery of work by book, poster, and greeting card-illustrator Mary Engelbreit. Engelbreit hand drew announcements and invitations for her exhibits, as well as other advertising and promotional material for the store. She also painted small chairs in her designs for the store’s children’s book section. Engelbreit’s well-known 1985 illustration A Book is a Present You Can Open Again and Again was originally created as a poster to advertise Left Bank Books. The store's name and address appeared on the original design, but this information was often removed in subsequent reproductions.

Collage announcing John Rozelle exhibition at Left Bank Books (1980)

The painter and collagist John Rozelle exhibited work at Left Bank Books in 1980. The artist created an announcement for his show at the store. Rozelle went on to teach at the School of the Art Institute of Chicago.

Painter Carol Carter, photographer Michael Eastman, painter Nancy Exarhu, and illustrator Joan Bugnitz have also exhibited at Left Bank Books.

=== Other activities ===
Left Bank Books regularly sponsors community literary activities. The store currently hosts several reading groups devoted to various subjects and genres of literature.

The Left Bank Books River City Readers Program connects financial donors to children in St. Louis Public Schools. The program's goals are to increase literacy and promote a love of reading among children in St. Louis area schools. Students in the program receive a free new book every other month and meet with authors throughout the school year.

In 2011, Left Bank Books helped launch the St. Louis Independent Bookstore Alliance. The Alliance helps raise awareness of independent bookstores in the St. Louis area and their contributions to the local community.

In 2014, after the shooting of Michael Brown in nearby Ferguson, Missouri, Left Bank Books launched Ferguson Reads, a monthly reading group discussing literary and historical works on race and the black Civil Rights Movement. The store compiled the #BlackLivesMatter reading list, which included books such as Ralph Ellison's Invisible Man, James Baldwin's The Fire Next Time, and Jesmyn Ward's Men We Reaped. The store's Black Lives Matter window display was the subject of a customer complaint that lead to an article in Huffington Post. In 2015, Left Bank Books established Mixed Messages Press, to publish literary fiction and other writing. In November 2014, Mixed Messages Press published A Wedding Song for Poorer People by Alfred DePew.

In 2017, Left Bank Books launched Bookfest St. Louis, a week long book festival centered on the Central West End neighborhood. 2017 presenting authors included Sherman Alexie, Amy Stewart, and Ann Leckie.

== Left Bank Books Foundation ==
The non-profit Left Bank Books Foundation was formed in 2008 by a collection of current and former owners and other community members. The Foundation receives the majority of its funding from small individual donations to the Friends of Left Bank Books. The Foundation sponsors literary events and also works with St. Louis Public School children through the store's River City Readers Program. The project provides copies of children's books to area students and arranges author visits to schools.

== Recognition ==
Left Bank Books is frequently recognized for its contributions to the Central West End neighborhood, its wider community activities, and promotion of regional literary culture. In 2003, the St. Louis Board of Aldermen passed a resolution recognizing Left Bank Books' "more than 30 years of commitment and service to the City of St. Louis."

The store is often listed among the best new and used bookstores by local, regional, and national media and organizations. For many years the store has been voted by readers and editors of the local RiverFront Times in the categories best bookstore, best used bookstore, and best bookstore chain (when it had multiple locations). In 2015 the store was shortlisted for both the Publishers Weekly Bookstore of the Year Award and the WNBA Pannell Award. In 2017, Real Simple magazine named Left Bank Books the "best bookstore" in Missouri. Huffington Post has also recognized it as one of the "50 Best Independent Bookstores in America".

The store's significance in the history of the St. Louis LGBTQ community was recognized by its inclusion of its second (Delmar Blvd.) location in Washington University libraries' Mapping LGBTQ St. Louis project in 2017.

== Literary mentions ==
Left Bank Books is mentioned in the Kyle Beachy novel The Slide. It was also the subject of a short story by Guggenheim Fellow Kathleen Finneran in the anthology My Bookstore: Writers Celebrate Their Favorite Places to Browse, Read and Shop. Left Bank Books was mentioned in the blog of graphic artist Alison Bechdel, creator of the long-running comic strip Dykes to Watch Out For and bestselling graphic novel Fun Home. The store is also mentioned in Emily Giffin's 2012 novel Where We Belong: A Novel.
