= Diane Nelson =

Diane Nelson may refer to:

- Diane Dezura, née Nelson, Canadian curler
- Diane Nelson (businesswoman), American business executive
- Diane Nelson (jockey), American jockey and model

== See also ==
- Dianne Nelson, American short story writer
