= Debra Monroe =

American writer

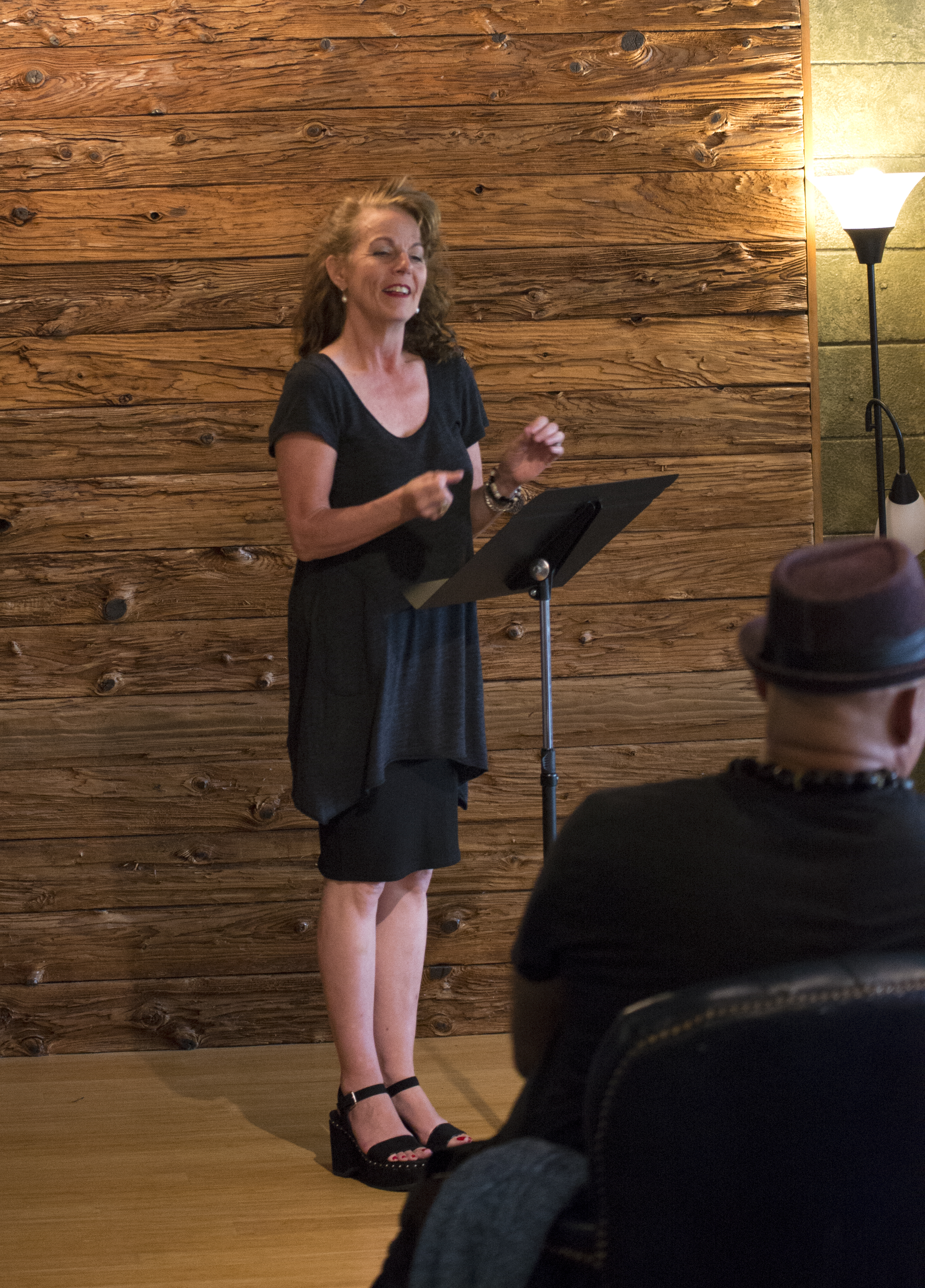
- At Malvern Books, Austin Texas, 2018. (p/c: Joshua J. Hines)
- Born: Aberdeen, South Dakota, U.S.
- Education: University of Wisconsin-Eau Claire (BA); Kansas State University (MA); University of Utah (PhD)
- Occupations: Author, professor
- Website: www.debramonroe.net

Debra Monroe is an American novelist, short story writer, memoirist, and essayist. She has written seven books, including two story collections, a collection of essays, two novels, and two memoirs, and is also editor of an anthology of nonfiction. Monroe has been twice nominated for the National Book Award, is a winner of the prestigious Flannery O'Connor Award for Short Fiction, and was cited on several "10 Best Books" lists for her nationally-acclaimed memoir, On the Outskirts of Normal: Forging a Family Against the Grain.

As a Professor of English at Texas State University–San Marcos, Monroe has received numerous honors, including the Presidential Award for Excellence in Teaching, 2012, and The Conference of Southern Graduate Schools Outstanding Mentor Award, 2020.

== Early life and education ==
Monroe was born in Aberdeen, South Dakota and grew up in Spooner, Wisconsin. She received her Bachelor of Arts degree in English from the University of Wisconsin–Eau Claire, her Master of Arts degree from Kansas State University, and a Doctor of Philosophy degree in English from the University of Utah. Monroe has previously taught at the University of North Carolina at Greensboro and currently teaches in the MFA Program at Texas State University–San Marcos. She lives in Austin, Texas.

== Reception ==
Monroe's work has been well received and widely published, appearing in many journals including the New England Review, the Southern Review, Doubletake, Hobart, the Florida Review, the Cimarron Review, Guernica, The American Scholar, Prairie Schooner, and Callaloo, as well as in mainstream publications, including Longreads, Salon, Texas Monthly, and the New York Times. Reviews of her books have been generally positive. Jonis Agee has said that Monroe's "prose shimmers like a jazz solo, full of sass and danger." Antonya Nelson writes that Monroe's "characters, like her prose, have hard edges. They also have big hearts, dark humor, and purely unique ways of opening themselves up for our inspection." Phillip Lopate writes that Monroe's storytelling has "consummate control and aphoristic wit." Her books have been included in Elle's top ten list, in Vanity Fair's hot picks, and were chosen as recommended reading by O, Oprah Winfrey's magazine. Monroe has garnered praise from several other publications including the Houston Chronicle, Salon, People Magazine, the Chicago Tribune, the Dallas Morning News, The Boston Globe, the Los Angeles Times, The Washington Post and others. Her essays have been cited in Houghton Mifflin's anthology The Best American Essays in 2012, 2013, and 2015.

== Awards ==
- 1990 Flannery O'Connor Award for Short Fiction
- Two National Book Award nominations
- John Gardner Fellowship

== Works ==
- The Source of Trouble. Simon & Schuster. 1995. ISBN 978-0-671-89716-1.
- A Wild, Cold State. Simon & Schuster. 1995. ISBN 978-0-671-89717-8.
- Newfangled. Simon & Schuster. 1998. ISBN 978-0-684-81905-1.
- Shambles: a novel. Southern Methodist University Press. 2004. ISBN 978-0-87074-486-0.
- On the Outskirts of Normal: Forging a Family Against the Grain. Southern Methodist University Press. 2010. ISBN 978-0-87074-560-7.
- My Unsentimental Education. University of Georgia Press. 2015. ISBN 978-0820348742.
- Contemporary Creative Nonfiction: An Anthology. Kendall Hunt. 2019. ISBN 9781524980092.
- It Takes A Worried Woman. University of Georgia Press. 2022. ISBN 9780820363080.
