= Sandra Thompson =

Sandra Thompson may refer to:

- Sandra Thompson (linguist), American linguist
- Sandra Thompson (writer), American novelist and short story writer
- Sandra L. Thompson, American government official
