= Dear Nicole =

Dear Nicole may refer to:

- "Dear Nicole", a short story by Jessica Treadway
- "Dear Nicole", a song by Frankmusik
