= Berkeley Fiction Review =

American literary magazine

- Categories: Literary magazine
- Frequency: Annual
- Publisher: University of California, Berkeley
- First issue: 1981; 45 years ago
- Country: United States
- Language: English
- Website: berkeleyfictionreview.org
- ISSN: 1087-7053
- OCLC: 34383126

Berkeley Fiction Review is an American literary magazine founded in 1981 and based at the University of California, Berkeley. Stories that have appeared in the Berkeley Fiction Review have been reprinted in The Best American Short Stories and the Pushcart Prize anthology. The Berkeley Fiction Review sponsors an annual Sudden Fiction Contest.

== Notable contributors ==
- Ellen Akins
- Jacob Appel
- Peter Bichsel
- Charles Bukowski
- K-Ming Chang
- Seamus Deane
- Mark Dery
- Will Eno
- Jürgen Fauth
- DeWitt Henry
- Neil Jordan
- Perri Klass
- Jeanne M. Leiby
- Karin Lin-Greenberg
- B. K. Loren
- Valerie Miner
- John Montague
- Jess Mowry
- Álvaro Mutis
- Joyce Carol Oates
- Dmitri Prigov
- Daniel Scott
- Olga Sedakova
- Hal Sirowitz
- Elena Shvarts
- Julia Vinograd
- Gerald Vizenor
- Nellie Wong

== Masthead ==
- Managing Editors
  - Bianca Sandoval
  - Kate Hayashi
  - Misha Bazarov
  - Ella Kirshbaum
- Editors
  - Catherine Han
  - Georgia Kerr
  - Sigrid Madzunkova
  - Anisa Qadir
  - Marisa Duarte
  - Andrea Altamirano
  - Madison Kim
  - Emily Hamill
  - Emery Arias
  - Luna Garza-Hillman
  - Nat Tiscareño
  - Alexander Flores
  - Joshua Dean
  - Sofia Wallace
  - Isabel Vasquez
  - Vivian Xie

== Founders ==
- Julia Littleton
- Jenne Mowry
- Joe Sciallo
- Paul Wedderien

== Past Managing Editors ==
- Lauren Cooper
- Hannah Harrington
- Ben Rowen
- Lisa Jenkins
- Miranda King
- Kelsey Nolan
- Paige Vehlewald
- Alagia Cirolia
- Tessa Gregory
- Eva Nierenberg
- Christian White
- Brighton Earley
- Jennifer Brown
- Caitlin McGuire
- Rachel Brumit
- Bryce Kobrin
- Rhoda Piland
- John Rauschenberg
- Elaine Wong
- Grace Fujimoto
- Nikki Thompson
- Daphne Young
- Hugh O'Byrne Pedy
- Gregory Charles Magnuson
- Mark Landsman
- Sean Andrew Locke
- James Penner
- Shelley Crist
- Julia E. Lave
- Julie Christianson
- Christina Ferrari
- Christopher Greger
- Dionisio Valesco
- Terrence Gee
- Summar Farah
- Bailey Dunn
- Arya Sureshbabu
- Molly Nolan
- Regina Lim
- Alex Jiménez
- Madelyn Peterson
- Aaron Saliman
- Isabel Hinchliff
- Kasandra Tapia
- Liam Magee
- Gillian Gee
- Julianne Han
- Sofia Hernandez
- Joyce Ro

== Special Features ==
- Issue 6 (1985–86): Contemporary Poetry from the Soviet Union
- Issue 8 (Fall 1988): Works by, and Interviews with, Contemporary Irish Authors
- Issue 9 (Fall 1989): Stereoscopic Photographs
- Issue 16 (Spring 1997): First Annual Sudden Fiction Contest
- Issue 17 (Fall 1997): An early work by international award-winning Colombian writer Álvaro Mutis

== See also ==
- List of literary magazines
