= Daniel Curley =

American writer (1918–1988)

- Born: October 4, 1918; East Bridgewater, Massachusetts, U.S.
- Died: December 30, 1988 (aged 70); Tallahassee, Florida, U.S.
- Education: University of Alabama
- Occupations: Novelist; Short story writer
- Children: 4

Daniel Curley (October 4, 1918 – December 30, 1988) was an American novelist, short story writer, and professor.

== Life ==
Curley was a native of East Bridgewater, Massachusetts. He was accepted and matriculated at the Massachusetts Institute of Technology (MIT), but transferred to, and graduated from the University of Alabama.

He taught at the University of Illinois at Urbana-Champaign, and was an editor of the university's Accent literary magazine. He lived in Urbana, Illinois. Roger Ebert was a student, and recalled that Curley "introduced me to many of the cornerstones of my life's reading: 'The Love Song of J. Alfred Prufrock', Crime and Punishment, Madame Bovary, The Ambassadors, Nostromo, The Professor's House, The Great Gatsby, The Sound and the Fury. One day he handed out a mimeographed booklet of poems by E. E. Cummings, and told us told us to consider the typography as musical notations for reading the poems aloud. Cummings ever after was clear to me, and I know dozens of his poems by heart. He approached these works with undisguised admiration. We discussed felicities of language, patterns of symbolism, motivation, revelation of character." Ebert writes "I was to take every class Curley offered, including Fiction Writing, where one of the other students was Larry Woiwode, then obviously already the real thing. Curley read our stories aloud anonymously, to encourage open discussion. There was never any doubt who wrote Woiwode's." Woiwode won the William Faulkner Foundation Award for What I'm Going to Do, I Think and served as the Poet Laureate of North Dakota.

He married and had four daughters, and a stepdaughter. On December 30, 1988, Curley and his wife, Audrey, were struck by a car while crossing a street in Tallahassee, Florida, where they were on vacation; Curley died in the incident and his wife sustained a broken ankle.

== Awards ==
- 1985 Flannery O'Connor Award for Short Fiction for Living With Snakes

== Works ==
=== Novels ===
- How Many Angels? (Beacon Press, 1958)
- A Stone Man, Yes (Michael Joseph, 1964)
- Mummy (Houghton Mifflin, 1987)

=== Short fiction ===
- That Marriage Bed of Procrustes (Beacon Press, 1957) aka The Marriage Bed
- In the Hands of Our Enemies (University of Illinois Press, 1971)
- Love in the Winter (University of Illinois Press, 1976)
- Living with Snakes (University of Georgia Press, 1985)
- The Curandero (BkMk Press, 1991)

=== Anthologies ===
- Best American Short Stories, 1964. Ballantine Books. ISBN 978-0-395-07688-0.
- Charles East, ed. (1993). "Trinity". The Flannery O'Connor Award: Selected Stories. University of Georgia Press. p. 50. ISBN 978-0-8203-1524-9. "Daniel Curley."
