= Nancy Zafris =

American novelist and short story writer

- Occupation(s): American novelist and short story writer
- Notable work: Series editor for the Flannery O'Connor award and former senior Fulbright fellow

Nancy Zafris was an American novelist and short story writer.

She won individual artist's grants, from the Massachusetts Arts Council, the Greater Columbus Arts Council, and the Ohio Arts Council. She was a senior Fulbright fellow, and taught at Masaryk University . She taught at the University of Pittsburgh, Centre College, and Ohio State University.

Her work appeared in Antioch Review, Alaska Quarterly Review, Black Warrior Review, Story Quarterly, and Wind. She was the fiction editor of Kenyon Review and series editor for the Flannery O'Connor award. She died in Columbus, Ohio, on August 1, 2021.

== Awards ==
- Two-time winner of the National Endowment for the Arts grant
- 1990 Flannery O'Connor Award for Short Fiction, for The People I Know

== Works ==
- The People I Know, University of Georgia Press (1990) ISBN 978-0-8203-3420-2
- The Metal Shredders, BlueHen Books (2002) ISBN 978-0-399-14922-1
- Lucky Strike, Unbridled Books (2005) ISBN 978-1-932961-04-1
- The Home Jar, Northern Illinois University Press (2013) ISBN 978-0875806884
- Black Road, Unbridled Books (2023, posthumously) ISBN 978-1609531508

- "Travel" Smoke Long Quarterly
- "After Lunch" Prairie Schooner Winter 2007
