= Mary Clyde =

American writer (born 1953)

- Born: February 19, 1953 (age 73); Provo, Utah, U.S.
- Education: Brigham Young University; University of Utah (MA); Vermont College (MFA)
- Occupation: Writer
- Children: 5
- Writing career
- Genre: Short story
- Notable awards: Flannery O'Connor Award for Short Fiction (1999)

Mary Clyde (born February 19, 1953, in Provo, Utah) is an American short story writer, author of Survival Rates (W.W. Norton, 2001), which won the 1999 Flannery O'Connor Award for Short Fiction from the University of Georgia Press. Clyde was praised for her work by The New York Times: "Clyde's writing has many strengths, but the greatest one is her ability to transform a shallow experience into something resembling hope. That she does so with intelligence and wit makes this collection as good as they get." She graduated from Brigham Young University, University of Utah, with an MA in 1977 and Vermont College with an MFA in 1997. She is the mother of five children: Emily Clyde Curtis, Sarah, Rachel Jones, David, and Thomas.

== Published works ==
Short Story Collections

- Survival Rates. W. W. Norton & Company. 2001. ISBN 978-0-393-32084-8.

Anthology Publications

- Shannon Ravenel; Tony Earley, eds. (1999). "Krista had a Treble Clef Rose". New Stories from the South: The Year's Best 1999. Algonquin Books. p. 148. ISBN 9781565122475. "mary clyde."
- Angela Hallstrom, ed. (2010). "Jumping". Dispensation: Latter-Day Fiction. Zarahemla Books. ISBN 9780984360307.

== Sources ==
- Contemporary Authors Online, Gale, 2009. Farmington Hills, Mich.: Gale, 2009
