= T. M. McNally =

American writer

- Born: May 20, 1961 (age 65)
- Education: Rockford College; Arizona State University
- Occupations: Novelist; short story writer
- Writing career
- Notable awards: Flannery O'Connor Award for Short Fiction (1991)

T. M. McNally (born May 20, 1961) is an American novelist, and short story writer.

== Life ==
Born May 20, 1961, he was raised in Chicago, Illinois. He moved to Arizona when he was 15. He graduated from Rockford College and Arizona State University. McNally taught literature and writing at Webster University. He currently teaches at Arizona State University Tempe Campus.

== Awards ==
- Faulkner-Wisdom Gold Medal, for The Goat Bridge
- 1991 Flannery O'Connor Award for Short Fiction, for Low flying Aircraft
- Yale Review's Smart Family Foundation Award
- National Endowment for the Arts fellowship
- Howard Foundation fellowships at Brown University
- Pen/Faulkner Award for Fiction finalist

== Works ==
- The Gateway. Southern Methodist University Press. 2007. ISBN 978-0-87074-516-4.
- The Goat Bridge. University of Michigan Press. 2005. ISBN 978-0-472-11511-2. "TM McNally."
- Quick. University of Michigan Press. 2004. ISBN 978-0-472-11452-8.
- Almost Home. Simon and Schuster. 1999. ISBN 978-0-684-85445-8.
- Until Your Heart Stops. Ivy Books. 1994. ISBN 978-0-8041-1243-7.
- Low Flying Aircraft. University of Georgia Press. 1991. ISBN 978-0-8203-1378-8.
