= The Man Back There =

The Man Back There, David Crouse's second collection of short fiction, was awarded the Mary McCarthy Prize in Short Fiction in 2007. Selected by judge Mary Gaitskill, the collection is a \portrayal of nine very different—but also very similar—men living on the margins of society.

Andre Dubus III, author of the best-selling House of Sand and Fog, says of The Man Back There, "In this virtuoso collection of stories, David Crouse guides us directly to where the shadow lies - the disorienting loss, the surprising heartache, the forgotten wound - those inevitable areas of the psyche we all share and through which only truth, illuminatedwith a such a light touch here, can deliver us; The Man Back There and Other Stories is the work of the real thing."

In her introduction to The Man Back There, Gaitskill writes simply, "I chose these stories because they made me feel...."
