= Patrick Earl Ryan =

American author

Patrick Earl Ryan (born in New Orleans) is the founder and editor in chief of Lodestar Quarterly. He is a winner of the Flannery O'Connor Award for Short Fiction.
