= Copy Cats (short story collection) =

Copy Cats, a short-story collection by David Crouse, was awarded the Flannery O'Connor Award for Short Fiction in 2005. Copy Cats was subsequently nominated for the Pen-Faulkner Award in 2006.

Copy Cats consists of seven short stories and one extended novella, and takes as its themes issues of identity and alienation. The story "Kopy Kats" is about a world of false images and doubles, as its protagonist—a man who works in a hectic copy shop—seeks authenticity in his life and finds only more and more imitations. "Retreat" deals with the intersection of mental illness and art, as two characters attend an art camp for people with nervous disorders. "Click" dramatizes the life of a middle-brow photographer as he tries to record the life of a part-time prostituted and drug addict; but his increasing identification with his subject moves him away from his own tenuous sense of self.

The Boston Globe compared Copy Cats to the work of short story writers Andre Dubus and Richard Yates.
