= Peter LaSalle =

American writer

- Born: 1947 (age 78–79)
- Education: Harvard University (BA); University of Chicago (MA)
- Occupations: Novelist; short story writer; travel essayist
- Writing career
- Notable awards: Flannery O'Connor Award for Short Fiction (2007)

Peter LaSalle (born 1947) is an American novelist, short story writer, and travel essayist.

== Life ==
He graduated from Harvard University with a B.A. in 1969, and the University of Chicago with an M.A. in 1972.

His books include the novels Mariposa's Song and Strange Sunlight; the short story collections Tell Borges If You See Him, Hockey Sur Glace, The Graves of Famous Writers, What I Found Out About Her, and Sleeping Mask: Fictions; and two collections of essays on literary travel, The City at Three P.M.: Writing, Reading, and Traveling and The World Is a Book, Indeed.

His fiction has appeared in magazines and journals such as Agni, Antioch Review, Paris Review, Tin House, New England Review, Virginia Quarterly Review, Yale Review, Zoetrope: All-Story, and others. His essays, articles, and book reviews have appeared in The Nation, The Progressive, Worldview, Commonweal, The New York Times Book Review, The Chicago Sun-Times, The Los Angeles Times, and others.

He teaches at the University of Texas at Austin, where he is the Susan Taylor McDaniel Regents Professor in Creative Writing in the Department of English and a resident faculty member at the Michener Center for Writers.

== Awards ==
- Flannery O'Connor Award for Tell Borges If You See Him
- Richard Sullivan Prize in Short Fiction for What I Found Out About Her
- The Antioch Review Award for Distinguished Prose
- O. Henry Award
- National Endowment for the Arts Creative Writing Fellowship

== Works ==
=== Books ===
- LaSalle, Peter (2020). The World Is a Book, Indeed. 2020. LSU Press. ISBN 978-1-942-65818-4.
- LaSalle, Peter (2017). Sleeping Mask: Fictions. 2017. Bellevue Literary Press. ISBN 978-0807173961.
- LaSalle, Peter (2015). The City at Three P.M.: Writing, Reading, and Traveling. Dzanc Books. ISBN 978-1-938-10320-9.
- LaSalle, Peter (2014). What I Found Out About Her: Stories of Dreaming Americans. University of Notre Dame Press. ISBN 978-0-268-03392-7.
- LaSalle, Peter (2012). Mariposa's Song, a novel. Texas Tech University Press. ISBN 978-0-89672-743-4.
- LaSalle, Peter (2007). Tell Borges If You See Him: Tales of Contemporary Somnambulism. University of Georgia Press. ISBN 978-0-8203-2998-7.
- LaSalle, Peter (1996). Hockey Sur Glace: Stories. Breakaway Books. ISBN 978-1-55821-505-4.
- LaSalle, Peter (1984). Strange Sunlight, a novel. Texas Monthly Press. ISBN 978-0-932012-87-6.
- LaSalle, Peter (1980). The Graves of Famous Writers, and Other Stories. University of Missouri Press. ISBN 978-0-8262-0287-1.

=== Anthologies (work included in) ===
- Eric Laughman, ed. (2020). A Perfect Souvenir: Stories About Travel. University of Georgia Press.
- Paul Theroux; Jason Wilson, eds. (2014). The Best American Travel Writing 2014. Boston: Houghton Mifflin.
- Nancy Zafris, ed. (2013). Stories from the Flannery O'Connor Award: A 20th Anniversary Anthology (e-book). University of Georgia Press.
- James Thomas; D. Seth Horton, eds. (2011). The Best of the West 2011: New Stories from the Wide Side of the Missouri. University of Texas Press.
- Bill Buford; Jason Wilson, eds. (2010). The Best American Travel Writing 2010. Boston: Houghton Mifflin. ISBN 9780547333359.
- Gorge Pelecanos; Otto Penzler, eds. (2008). The Best American Mystery Stories 2008. Boston: Houghton Mifflin. ISBN 9780618812677.
- Peter Stine; Doug Hagley, eds. (2008). The Best of Witness 1987-2004. Michigan State University Press.
- Jeff VanderMeer; Anne Vandermeer, eds. (2007). The Best American Fantasy 2007. Prime Books. ISBN 9780809562800.
- Don Graham, ed. (2007). Literary Austin. Texas Christian University Press.
- Judith Taylor; Nickole Brown, eds. (2003). Airfare: Stories, Poems, and Essays on Flight. Sarabande Books.
- Paul D. Staudohar, ed. (2003). More Sports Best Short Stories. Chicago Review Press.
- Don Graham, ed. (2003). Lone Star Literature: From the Red River to the Rio Grande. W. W. Norton & Company.
- Paul D. Staudohar, ed. (2003). Sports Best Short Stories. Chicago Review Press.
- Kirby Gann; Kristin Herbert, eds. (2001). A Fine Excess: Contemporary Literature at Play. Sarabande Books. ISBN 978-1-889330-51-8.
- Bruce Emra, ed. (2001). Sports in Literature. Chicago: National Textbook Company.
- Peter Stine, ed. (1995). Sports in America. Wayne State University Press. ISBN 978-0-8143-2557-5.
- Jay Jennings, ed. (1995). Tennis and the Meaning of Life: A Literary Anthology of the Game. Breakaway Books (Harcourt Brace, paper). ISBN 978-1-55821-378-4.
- Alexander Blackburn; Kenneth Pellow, eds. (1993). Higher Elevations: A Writers Forum Anthology. Swallow/Ohio University Press.
- William Abrahams, ed. (1991). Prize Stories 1991: The O. Henry Awards. Doubleday. ISBN 978-0-385-41513-2.
- James Thomas; Denise Thomas, eds. (1991). The Best of the West 4: New Stories from the Wide Side of the Missouri. W. W. Norton & Company. ISBN 978-0-393-30793-1.
- George P. Garrett; Sheila McMillen, eds. (1990). Eric Clapton's Lover and Other Stories from the Virginia Quarterly Review. University of Virginia Press.
- Don Graham, ed. (1986). South by Southwest: 24 Stories from Modern Texas. University of Texas Press.
- Joyce Carol Oates; Shannon Ravenel, eds. (1979). The Best American Short Stories 1979. Boston: Houghton Mifflin.
