= Toni Graham =

American fiction writer (born 1945)

- Born: Toni Avila; 1945 (age 80–81); San Francisco
- Education: San Francisco State University
- Occupations: Fiction writer, professor, editor The Cimarron Review
- Writing career
- Genre: Fiction
- Notable awards: Flannery O'Connor Award for Short Fiction

Toni Graham (born 1945) is an American fiction writer. She is a professor of English at Oklahoma State University; she also serves as editor and fiction editor for The Cimarron Review.

== Biography ==
Graham earned an MFA in fiction writing from San Francisco State University. She has taught fiction writing at Oklahoma State University since 2000 and is Professor of English/Creative Writing. She has served as editor for the Cimarron Review since 2011 and as fiction editor from 2000 to the present.

Before being appointed to the faculty at Oklahoma State University, Graham taught creative writing at a number of California universities, including University of San Francisco; Santa Clara University; University of California, Santa Cruz; and Chico State.

== Books ==
- The Suicide Club: Stories, University of Georgia Press, (2015) ISBN 978-0820348506
- Waiting for Elvis, Leapfrog Press, (2005) ISBN 978-0972898447
- The Daiquiri Girls, University of Massachusetts Press, (1998) ISBN 978-1558491670

== Awards ==
- Regents Distinguished Teaching Award, 2016
- Flannery O'Connor Award for Short Fiction, 2014, for The Suicide Club.
- John Gardner Book Award, 2006, for Waiting for Elvis
- Grace Paley Award for Short Fiction, 1997, for The Daiquiri Girls
