= Carole L. Glickfeld =

American novelist and short story writer

- Born: Brooklyn, New York
- Occupations: Novelist, short story writer, editor, and writing coach
- Writing career
- Notable works: Swimming Toward the Ocean; Useful Gifts
- Notable awards: 2002 Washington State Book Award for Swimming Toward the Ocean; 1991 National Endowment for the Arts Literary Fellowship; 1991 Washington State Governor's Arts Award; 1987 Flannery O'Connor Award for Short Fiction
- Website: www.caroleglickfeld.com

Carole L. Glickfeld is an American novelist and short story writer.

== Life ==
Glickfeld was born in Brooklyn and grew up in Inwood, Manhattan. She graduated from the City College of New York with a Bachelor's degree in Languages and Literature, and studied English literature at Hunter Graduate School.

She has taught at Interlochen Arts Academy and the University of Washington.

Glickfeld was employed by the Washington State Legislature, the U.S. Congress, and served as Director of the Seattle Mayor’s Office for Senior Citizens.

She lives in Seattle.

== Awards ==
- 2002 Washington State Book Award for Swimming Toward the Ocean
- 1991 National Endowment for the Arts Literary Fellowship
- 1991 Washington State Governor's Arts Award
- 1987 Flannery O'Connor Award for Short Fiction

== Works ==
- Swimming Toward the Ocean. New York: Alfred A. Knopf. February 2001. ISBN 978-0-385-72176-9.
- Useful Gifts. Athens, GA: The University of Georgia Press. 1989. ISBN 978-0-8203-1041-1. "Carol L. Glickfeld."

=== Anthologies ===
- Alan King, ed. (2005). "What Are You?". Matzo Balls for Breakfast: And Other Memories of Growing Up Jewish. Simon and Schuster. ISBN 978-0-7432-6074-9.
- Faye Moskowitz, ed. (1995). "Plastic Flowers". Her Face in the Mirror. Beacon Press. ISBN 978-0-8070-3615-0.
- Charles East, ed. (1993). "What My Mother Knows". The Flannery O'Connor Award: Selected Stories. University of Georgia Press. p. 99. ISBN 978-0-8203-1524-9. "Carol L. Glickfeld."
- Becoming Myself: Reflections on Growing Up Female, ed. Willa Shalit
