= Carol Roh Spaulding =

American writer

Carol Spaulding-Kruse
- Education: California State University, Fresno (BA, MA); University of Iowa (PhD)
- Writing career
- Pen name: Carol Roh Spaulding
- Notable awards: Flannery O'Connor Award for Short Fiction (2022)
- Website: carolrohspaulding.com

Carol Roh Spaulding is the pen name of Carol Spaulding-Kruse, an American writer of fiction and non-fiction who teaches at Drake University. She has stated she uses that pen name to blend her Korean and European heritage.

She is the 2022 winner of the Flannery O'Connor Award for Short Fiction.

== Education ==
Spaulding-Kruse attended California State University, Fresno, earning a Bachelor of Arts in 1986 and a Master of Arts in 1988. She then received a Doctor of Philosophy from the University of Iowa in 1996.

== Awards ==
In 2022, Waiting for Mr. Kim and Other Stories won the Flannery O'Connor Award for Short Fiction.

== Publications ==
- Smith, Kay Fenton; Spaulding, Carol Roh (2011). Zakery's Bridge: Children's Journeys from Around the World to Iowa. Shrieking Tree. ISBN 9780578075464.
- Spaulding, Carol Roh (2023). Waiting for Mr. Kim and Other Stories. University of Georgia Press. ISBN 9780820365268.
