= Jeanne M. Leiby =

American writer and magazine editor (1964-2011)

Jeanne Leiby (September 3, 1964 - April 19, 2011) was an American fiction writer and literary magazine editor. Leiby's short stories were published in several U.S. literary journals, including Fiction, Indiana Review, The Greensboro Review, and New Orleans Review. In 2000, she won the Poets and Writers Writer Exchange. Her first collection of short stories, Downriver, was published by Carolina Wren Press as the 2006 winner of the Doris Bakwin prize. Leiby also served as fiction editor of Black Warrior Review and as the Editor in Chief of the Florida Review (2004–2007). In Spring 2008, she took over as editor of The Southern Review at LSU in Baton Rouge, Louisiana.

In her early career working as an intern at a publishing house, she was responsible for finding and publishing White Oleander by Janet Fitch.

She also taught fiction writing and creative writing at UCF (University of Central Florida) for a couple of years, leaving in 2008 for her new job at the Southern Review. She also served as the editor of the Florida Review for the duration of her stay. She was hugely influential to her students, helping many of them pursue careers in writing as well.

Leiby grew up downriver Detroit. She earned a BA at the University of Michigan, an MA at the Bread Loaf School of English/Middlebury College, and an MFA at the University of Alabama.

She was killed in a car accident in Louisiana on April 19, 2011. Police reports said she was driving a 2007 Saturn convertible with the top down. She was not wearing a seat belt. She lost control of the vehicle, hit the guardrail almost head on and was ejected from the vehicle. She was taken by helicopter to hospital, but she was pronounced dead on arrival.

== Bibliography ==
- Downriver (2007) Carolina Wren Press/Winner of the Doris Bawkin Prize.
- "Docks" in Nimrod. Honorable mention in the Katherine Ann Porter Prize.
- "Family Meeting" in Alaska Quarterly Review, Spring 2003
- "Pink" in Witness
- "A Place Alone" in Fiction
- "Henrietta and the Headache" in Berkeley Fiction Review
- "Days of the Renovation" in Seattle Review
- "Vinegar Tasting" in Indiana Review
- "Living With A Gun Runner," winner of Flyway Fiction Prize and nominated for a Pushcart Prize
- "Days of the Renovation," second place in the Michael Gearhart Poetry Prize, SunDog: The Southeast Review
