= David Walton (writer) =

American novelist

- Occupations: Short story writer; novelist; critic
- Writing career
- Notable awards: Flannery O'Connor Award for Short Fiction (1983)

David Walton is an American short story writer, novelist and critic.

== Life ==
He is semi-retired from University of Pittsburgh Kenneth P. Dietrich School of Arts and Sciences in Oakland, now teaching mainly in the university's Osher Lifelong Learning Institute. He lives in Pittsburgh, Pennsylvania.

== Awards ==
- 1983 Flannery O'Connor Award for Short Fiction

== Works ==
- Ride. Carnegie-Mellon University Press. October 2002. ISBN 978-0-88748-377-6.
- Evening Out. University of Georgia Press. January 1983. ISBN 978-0-8203-0629-2.
- Waiting in Line: Stories. Ardis. June 1975. ISBN 978-0-88233-088-4.

=== Criticism ===
- David Walton (August 24, 2003). "'Our Lady of the Forest' one of year's best novels". The Pittsburgh Tribune-Review.
- DAVID WALTON (December 9, 2003). "Poetry unleashed". The Petersburg Times Floridian.
- David Walton (May 22, 2005). "McCullough captures drama in '1776'". The Pittsburgh Tribune-Review.
- David Walton (November 6, 2005). "'The Lost Painting' a thrilling detective yarn". The Pittsburgh Tribune-Review.
- David Walton (January 4, 2009). Review: In 'Fires of Vesuvius' by Mary Beard, Pompeii's ruins have much to tell. Archived from the original on June 7, 2011.
- DAVID WALTON (May 12, 2009). "'Stone's Fall' by Iain Pears: A mystery of epic proportions". The Dallas Morning News.
- David Walton (September 13, 2009). "Veronica Buckley captures 'The Secret Wife of Louis XIV' in her biography of an unassuming mistress". The Cleveland Plain Dealer.
- David Walton (September 29, 2009). "How falsehoods spread". The Louisville Courier-Journal.
- DAVID WALTON (Oct 10, 2009). "A.S. Byatt's "The Children's Book"". The Kansas City Star.
