= David Crouse =

David Nikki Crouse
- Born: Boston, Massachusetts, Massachusetts, United States
- Occupations: Short story writer and Teacher

David Nikki Crouse is a short story writer and professor at the University of Washington. Crouse's work explores issues of identity and alienation, and their (Note: Crouse uses they/them pronouns.) stories are populated with characters living on the fringes of American society. The Flannery O'Connor Award for Short Fiction was awarded to them in 2005 for their first collection of short stories, Copy Cats. Published in 2008, their most recent collection of stories, The Man Back There, was awarded the Mary McCarthy Prize.

They have been published extensively in the literary journal circuit, with stories appearing in The Greensboro Review, Chelsea, Quarterly West, and The Beloit Fiction Journal. With a collection of three novellas entitled Continuity nearing completion, they have begun work on their first novel.

Having helped to establish a creative writing program at Chester College of New England, a renowned liberal arts college located in Chester, New Hampshire, Crouse returned to the University of Alaska Fairbanks, which awarded them their MFA in Creative Writing in 1996. They continue to teach creative writing at both the undergraduate and graduate level.

They have written in the comic book genre, with their work appearing in The Darkhorse Book of the Dead, (Darkhorse Comics).

== Selected Works ==
Copy Cats (2005)

The Man Back There (2008)

I'm Here: Alaska Stories (2023)

Extinction (2026) (novel)
