= Monica McFawn =

American writer

Monica McFawn (born Monica McFawn Robinson) is an American writer. Her story collection, Bright Shards of Someplace Else, won the 2013 Flannery O'Connor Award. McFawn is the recipient of a National Endowment for the Arts Fellowship in Literature, and her work has appeared in journals such as the Georgia Review, Confrontation, Gargoyle, Web Conjunctions, Conduit, Passages North, and Hotel Amerika. She received her MFA in Poetry from Western Michigan University, and has published both fiction and poetry. She is an Assistant Professor of English at Northern Michigan University.

Her great uncle is John Hopfield, originator of the Hopfield network.

== Published works ==
=== Books ===
- Bright Shards of Someplace Else, story collection from the University of Georgia Press, 2014
