= Flannery O'Connor Award for Short Fiction =

North American writing contest

- Official award logo
- Awarded for: Collection of English-language short stories by a North American writer
- Country: United States
- Presented by: University of Georgia Press
- First award: 1983; 43 years ago
- Website: www.ugapress.org/series/flannery-oconnor-award-for-short-fiction/

The Flannery O'Connor Award for Short Fiction is an annual prize awarded by the University of Georgia Press in to a North American writer in a blind-judging contest for a collection of English language short stories. The collection is subsequently published by the University of Georgia Press. The prize is named in honor of the American short story writer and novelist Flannery O'Connor.

The prize was established in 1983 by Charles East and has since published more than seventy collections. Originally, the prize was awarded annually to two winners for a collection of short stories or novellas. Starting in 2016, there has only been one winner per competition cycle.

The award has helped launch the literary careers of Ha Jin, Antonya Nelson, Rita Ciresi and Mary Hood.

== Winners ==
- 1983 David Walton for Evening Out
- 1983 Leigh Allison Wilson for From the Bottom Up
- 1984 Mary Hood for How Far She Went
- 1984 Sandra Thompson for Close-Ups
- 1984 Susan Neville for The Invention of Flight
- 1985 Daniel Curley Living with Snakes
- 1985 François Camoin for Why Men are Afraid of Women
- 1985 Molly Giles for Rough Translations
- 1986 Peter Meinke for The Piano Tuner
- 1986 Tony Ardizzone for The Evening News
- 1987 Melissa Pritchard for Spirit Seizures
- 1987 Salvatore La Puma for The Boys of Bensonhurst
- 1988 Gail Galloway Adams for The Purchase of Order
- 1988 Philip F. Deaver for Silent Retreats
- 1989 Carol L. Glickfeld for Useful Gifts
- 1990 Antonya Nelson for The Expendables
- 1990 Debra Monroe for The Source of Trouble
- 1990 Nancy Zafris for The People I Know
- 1991 Robert H. Abel for Ghost Traps
- 1991 T. M. McNally for Low flying Aircraft
- 1992 Alfred DePew for The Melancholy of Departure
- 1992 Dennis Hathaway for The Consequences of Desire
- 1993 Alyce Miller for The Nature of Longing
- 1993 Dianne Nelson for A Brief History of Male Nudes in America
- 1995 C. M. Mayo for Sky Over El Nido
- 1996 Ha Jin for Under the Red Flag
- 1996 Paul Rawlins for No Lie Like Love
- 1996 Wendy Brenner for Large Animals in Everyday Life
- 1998 Frank Soos for Unified Field Theory
- 1999 Hester Kaplan for The Edge of Marriage
- 1999 Mary Clyde for Survival Rates
- 2000 Robert Anderson for Ice Age
- 2000 Darrell Spencer for Caution: Men in Trees
- 2001 Bill Roorbach for Big Bend
- 2001 Dana Johnson for Break Any Woman Down
- 2002 Kellie Wells for Compression Scars
- 2002 Rita Ciresi for Mother Rocket
- 2003 Catherine Brady for Curled in the Bed of Love
- 2003 Ed Allen for Ate It Anyway
- 2004 No award (award to Brad Vice rescinded due to a plagiarism scandal)
- 2005 David Crouse for Copy Cats
- 2006 Greg Downs for Spit Baths
- 2007 Anne Panning for Super America
- 2007 Margot Singer for The Pale of Settlement
- 2007 Peter LaSalle for Tell Borges If You See Him
- 2008 Andrew J. Porter for The Theory of Light and Matter
- 2008 Peter Selgin for Drowning Lessons
- 2009 Geoffrey Becker for Black Elvis
- 2009 Lori Ostlund The Bigness of the World
- 2010 Jessica Treadway for Please Come Back to Me
- 2010 Linda L. Grover for The Dance Boots
- 2011 Amina Gautier for At-Risk
- 2011 Melinda Moustakis for Bear Down, Bear North: Alaska Stories
- 2012 E.J. Levy for Love, In Theory
- 2012 Hugh Sheehy for The Invisibles
- 2013 Jacqueline Gorman for The Viewing Room
- 2013 Tom Kealey for Thieves I've Known
- 2014 Karin Lin-Greenberg for Faulty Predictions
- 2014 Monica McFawn for Bright Shards of Someplace Else
- 2014 Toni Graham for The Suicide Club
- 2015 Anne Raeff for The Jungle Around Us
- 2015 Lisa Graley for The Current that Carries
- 2016 Becky Mandelbaum for Bad Kansas
- 2017 Kirsten Sundberg Lunstrum for What We Do With the Wreckage
- 2018 Colette Sartor for Once Removed
- 2019 Patrick Earl Ryan for If We Were Electric
- 2020 Kate McIntyre for Mad Prairie
- 2021 Toni Ann Johnson for Light Skin Gone to Waste
- 2022 Carol Roh Spaulding for Waiting for Mr. Kim and Other Stories
- 2023 Iheoma Nwachukwu for Japa and Other Stories
- 2024 A. Muia for A Desert Between Two Seas
- 2025 Will Boast for The Submerged

== Finalists ==
- 2009 Scott Elliott for Arrangements

== See also ==
- List of American literary awards
