= Karin Lin-Greenberg =

American fiction writer

Karin Lin-Greenberg is an American fiction writer. Her short story collection, Faulty Predictions (2014), won the Flannery O'Connor Award for Short Fiction. Her stories have appeared in The Antioch Review, Bellevue Literary Review, Berkeley Fiction Review, Epoch, Kenyon Review Online, New Ohio Review, the North American Review, and Redivider. She is currently an associate professor of English at Siena College in Loudonville, New York. She has previously taught at Missouri State University, the College of Wooster, and Appalachian State University. She earned an MFA in Fiction Writing from the University of Pittsburgh in 2006, an MA in Literature and Writing from Temple University in 2003, and a BA in English from Bryn Mawr College.

== Awards ==
- 2014 Flannery O'Connor Award for Short Fiction
- 2014 Foreword Review INDIEFAB Book of the Year Award (Gold Winner for Short Stories)

== Published works ==
- Faulty Predictions (2014). University of Georgia Press.
