= Ed Allen (writer) =

American writer

Edward Allen
- Born: 1948 (age 77–78); New Haven, Connecticut, United States
- Education: Goddard College
- Occupations: Novelist, short story writer

Edward Allen (born 1948) is an American novelist and short story writer.

== Life ==
Allen was born in New Haven, Connecticut. He grew up in New York. He graduated from Goddard College, and attended the Iowa Writers’ Workshop in 1972.

He graduated from Ohio University with an M.A. in 1986 and a Ph.D. in 1989.

He taught at Rhodes College in Memphis, the University of Central Oklahoma, Jagiellonian University in Kraków, Poland as a Senior Fulbright Fellow, San Jose State University, and the University of South Dakota.

His work has appeared in The New Yorker, Story magazine, Gentlemen’s Quarterly, and Southwest Review.

His novel, Mustang Sally, published in 1992, was purchased and made into a film called Easy Six. It was submitted to the 2003 Sundance Film Festival.

He lives in Vermillion, South Dakota where he is an English Professor.

== Awards ==
- 2002 Flannery O'Connor Award for Short Fiction
- 1994-1995 Senior Fulbright Fellowship

== Works ==
=== Novels ===
- Straight Through the Night. SOHO Press. 1990. ISBN 978-0-939149-36-0.
- Mustang Sally. W.W. Norton. 1992. ISBN 978-0-393-31156-3.

=== Non-fiction ===
- The Hands-On Fiction Workbook: An Activity-Based Approach to Fiction Writing. Prentice Hall. 1995. ISBN 978-0-13-238882-5.

=== Short stories ===
- Ate It Anyway. University of Georgia. 2002. p. 1. ISBN 978-0-8203-2558-3. "Ed Allen writer."

=== Poetry ===
- The Clean Place Ohio University, June 1989
- 67 Mixed Messages. Ahsahta Press, Boise State University. 2006. ISBN 978-0-916272-86-9.

=== Anthologies ===
- The Best American Short Stories, 1990. Houghton Mifflin. November 7, 1990. ISBN 978-0-395-51617-1.
