= Salvatore La Puma =

American writer

Salvatore John Giovanni La Puma (February 21, 1929 – May 8, 2008) was an Italian American short story writer.

== Life ==
He was born and raised in Bensonhurst, Brooklyn. In 1951, he was drafted, and served in the Korea War as a medic. In 1959, he moved to Westchester, and worked as an advertising copy editor. In 1967, he moved to Santa Barbara, California. He married Linda Ferrara in 1955; they had six children; they divorced in 1977; he married Joan Dewberry in 1980; they divorced in 2000.

His work appeared in Antioch Review, Kenyon Review. and Zyzzyva. He died in Santa Barbara on May 8, 2008.

== Awards ==
- 1987 Flannery O'Connor Award for Short Fiction
- 1988 O. Henry Award finalist
- 1988 American Book Award

== Works ==
- The boys of Bensonhurst: stories. University of Georgia Press. 1987. ISBN 978-0-8203-0891-3.
- A Time for Wedding Cake Norton. Random House. 1991. ISBN 978-0-517-12513-7.
- Teaching Angels to Fly. W W Norton & Co Inc. June 1992. ISBN 978-0-393-03358-8.

=== Anthologies ===
- Carol Bonomo Albright; Joanna Clapps Herman, eds. (2008). "A Marvelous Feat in a Common Place". Wild Dreams: The Best of Italian Americana. Fordham University Press. p. 251. ISBN 978-0-8232-2910-9.
- Charles East, ed. (1993). "Mouthpiece". The Flannery O'Connor Award: Selected Stories. University of Georgia Press. p. 124. ISBN 978-0-8203-1524-9.
- Regina Barreca, ed. (2002). Don't tell mama!: the Penguin book of Italian American writing. Penguin Books. ISBN 978-0-14-200247-6.
