= Paul Rawlins =

American short story writer, and editor

Paul Rawlins (born c. 1965) is an American short story writer, and editor.

== Life ==
He graduated from Brigham Young University with a BA, 1989, and an MA, 1992. His fiction appeared in Glimmer Train, Southeast Review, Sycamore Review, Tampa Review, and Prism. He lives in Salt Lake City.

== Awards ==
- PRISM International Short Fiction Award
- Utah Arts Council Award
- Flannery O'Connor Award for Short Fiction

== Works ==
- No lie like love: stories. University of Georgia Press. 1996. ISBN 978-0-8203-1868-4.
- The matter of these hours, Brigham Young University. Dept. of English., 1992
- "This is Just a Little Creepy". Ancestry Magazine. Sep–Oct 2006.

Jobs He has worked for many companies. His first job was taking inventory and eventually he became a writer/editor. He wrote at least one book and other articles in magazines.
