= The Marble Faun =

1860 novel by Nathaniel Hawthorne

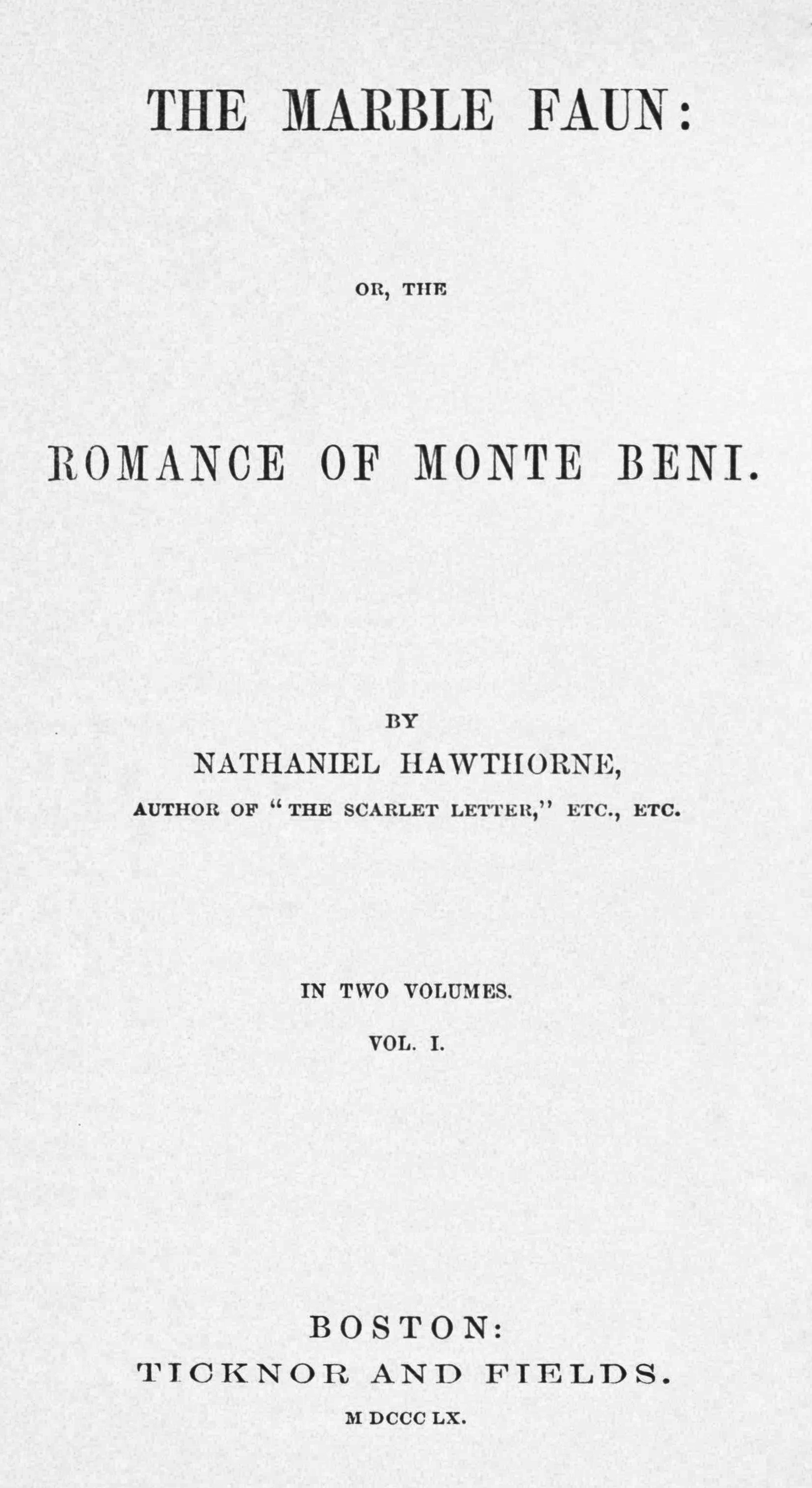
- First edition title page
- Author: Nathaniel Hawthorne
- Language: English
- Genre: Gothic novel
- Publisher: Ticknor and Fields
- Publication date: 1860
- Publication place: United States
- Media type: Print (Hardback)

The Marble Faun: Or, The Romance of Monte Beni, also known by the British title Transformation, was the last of the four major romances by Nathaniel Hawthorne, and was published in 1860. The Marble Faun, is set in a fantastical Italy. The romance mixes elements of a fable, pastoral, gothic novel, and travel guide.

== Characters ==
This romance focuses on four main characters: Miriam, Hilda, Kenyon, and Donatello.

Miriam is a beautiful painter with an unknown past. Throughout the novel, she is compared to many other women including Eve, Beatrice Cenci, Judith, and Cleopatra. Miriam is pursued by a mysterious, threatening man who is her "evil genius" through life. Hilda is an innocent copyist. She is compared to the Virgin Mary and the white dove. Her simple, unbendable moral principles can make her severe in spite of her tender heart. Miriam and Hilda are often contrasted.

Kenyon is a sculptor who represents rationalist humanism. He cherishes a romantic affection towards Hilda. Donatello, the Count of Monte Beni, is often compared to Adam and is in love with Miriam. Donatello amazingly resembles the marble Faun of Praxiteles, and the novel plays with the characters' belief that the Count may be a descendant of the antique Faun. Hawthorne, however, withholds a definite statement even in the novel's concluding chapters and postscript.

== Composition and publication history ==
After writing The Blithedale Romance in 1852, Hawthorne, who was then approaching fifty, was granted a political appointment as American Consul in Liverpool, England, which he held from 1853 to 1857. In 1858, Hawthorne and his wife Sophia Peabody moved the family to Italy and became tourists for a year and a half. In early 1858, Hawthorne was inspired to write his romance when he saw the Faun of Praxiteles in the Palazzo Nuovo of the Capitoline Museum in Rome.

Hawthorne began the manuscript and intended to complete it at the family home, The Wayside, in Concord, Massachusetts. Instead, he returned to England, where he would remain until July 1860, and entirely rewrote the book. On October 10, 1859, he wrote to his American publisher James T. Fields that his wife enjoyed what she had read thus far and "speaks of it very rapturously. If she liked the author less, I should feel much encouraged by her liking the Romance so much. I likewise (to confess the truth) admire it exceedingly, at intervals, but am liable to cold fits, during which I think it the most infernal nonsense." Sophia wrote to her sister Elizabeth Peabody that her husband's reaction was typical: "As usual, he thinks the book good for nothing... He has regularly despised each one of his books immediately upon finishing it."

Hawthorne struggled with a title for his new book. He considered several, including Monte Beni; or, The Faun: A Romance, The Romance of a Faun, Marble and Life; a Romance, Marble and Man; a Romance, and St. Hilda's Shrine. The book was published simultaneously in America and England in late 1860; the title for the British edition was Transformation: Or the Romance of Monte Beni. The alternate title was chosen by the publishers and was used against Hawthorne's wishes. Both titles continue to be used today in the U.K. Encouraged to write a book long enough to fill three volumes, Hawthorne included extended descriptions that critics found distracting or boring. Complaints about the ambiguous ending led Hawthorne to add a postscript to the second edition.

== Critical response ==
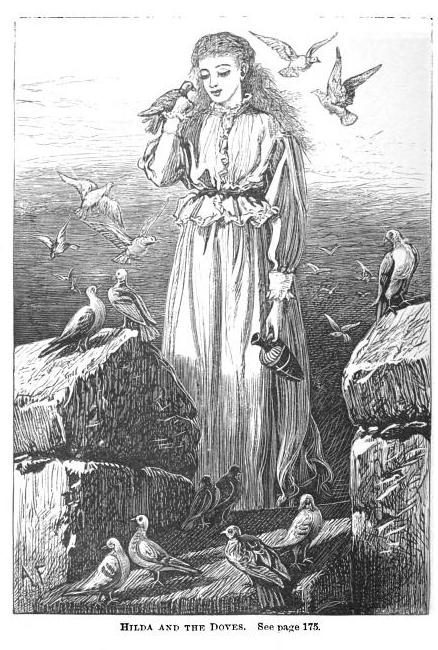
Illustration featuring "Hilda and the doves", 1888

Ralph Waldo Emerson called the novel "mush" but James Russell Lowell was pleased with it and praised it as a Christian parable. Henry Wadsworth Longfellow privately wrote that it was a "wonderful book" but that it had "the old, dull pain in it that runs through all of Hawthorne's writings". Reviews were generally favorable, though many were confused by the ending. William Dean Howells later wrote: "Everybody was reading it, and more or less bewailing its indefinite close, but yielding him that full honor and praise which a writer can hope for but once in his life." Friend and critic Edwin Percy Whipple noted that, even if Hawthorne had written nothing else, The Marble Faun would qualify him as a master of English composition. John Lothrop Motley wrote a long private letter to Hawthorne full of effusive praise:

With regard to the story, which has been slightly criticised, I can only say that to me it is quite satisfactory. I like those shadowy, weird, fantastic, Hawthornesque shapes flitting through the golden gloom which is the atmosphere of the book. I like the misty way in which the story is indicated rather than revealed. The outlines are quite definite enough, from the beginning to the end, to those who have imagination enough to follow you in your airy flights; and to those who complain, I suppose nothing less than an illustrated edition with a large gallows on the last page, with Donatello in the most pensive of attitudes, his ears revealed at last through a white nightcap, would be satisfactory.

== Influence ==
- The Marble Faun has been cited as an influence on H. P. Lovecraft's The Dream-Quest of Unknown Kadath.
- A Marble Faun is also the title of a book of poetry published in 1924 by William Faulkner.
- The Marble Faun is repeatedly referenced in the documentary Grey Gardens.

== Adaptations ==
In 1977 the novel was adapted into a three-part Italian miniseries, produced by RAI and directed by Silverio Blasi.

The novel was adapted into an opera with music by Ellen Bender and a libretto by Jessica Treadway, completed in 1996.
