= Kirsten Sundberg Lunstrum =

American writer and academic

- Born: March 17, 1979 (age 46) Chicago, Illinois, U.S.
- Education: Pacific Lutheran University (BA); University of California, Davis (MA)

Website
- kirstensundberglunstrum.com

Kirsten Sundberg Lunstrum (born March 17, 1979, in Chicago) is an American writer and academic. She is presently a faculty member in Antioch University's Creative Writing Program.

Her 2018 short story collection, What We Do With the Wreckage, won the 2017 Flannery O'Connor Award for Short Fiction. She has also won the a PEN/O. Henry Prize.

== Early life and education ==
Sundberg-Lunstrum was born in Chicago on March 17, 1979. Though she moved a lot as a child, she considered Washington her home.

In 1999, Sundberg Lunstrum received a Bachelor of Arts in English from Pacific Lutheran University. In 2003, she earned a Master of Arts in creative writing and fiction from the University of California, Davis.

== Awards and honors ==
Sundberg-Lunstrum received a fellowship from the MacDowell Colony in 2009, as well as a fellowship from The Jack Straw Cultural Center in 2016.

Her short stories "Where Have the Vanished Girls Gone?", initially published in North American Review, and "Endlings", which appeared in Ploughshares, were included in The Best American Short Stories 2019's list of "100 Distinguished Stories of 2018."

In 2017, What We Do With the Wreckage won the Flannery O'Connor Award for Short Fiction. She has also won the PEN/O. Henry Prize.

== Personal life ==
Sundberg-Lunstrum is married and has children.

== Publications ==
=== Anthology contributions ===
- Laughman, Ethan, ed. (2019). "The Starlings of Leicester Square". Spinning Away from the Center: Stories about Homesickness and Homecoming from the Flannery O'Connor Award for Short Fiction. University of Georgia Press. ISBN 9780820356600.
- Laughman, Ethan, ed. (2021). "What We Do With the Wreckage". Changes: Stories about Transformation from the Flannery O'Connor Award for Short Fiction. University of Georgia Press. ISBN 9780820358697.

=== Short story collections ===
- This Life She's Chosen. Chronicle Books. 2005. ISBN 9780811856560.
- Swimming with Strangers. Chronicle Books. 2008. ISBN 9780811860765.
- Abbott, Lee, ed. (2018). What We Do with the Wreckage: Stories. University of Georgia Press. ISBN 9780820353739.
