= Tom Kealey =

American writer

- Education: University of Massachusetts Amherst (MFA)
- Occupation: Writer
- Writing career
- Notable awards: Flannery O'Connor Award for Short Fiction (2013)

Tom Kealey is an American writer, the author of the story collection Thieves I've Known, winner of the 2012 Flannery O'Connor Award and named as one of NPR's 2013 Great Reads. He is also the author of The Creative Writing MFA Handbook. His stories have appeared in The Rumpus, Best American NonRequired, Glimmer Train, Story Quarterly, and Poets and Writers.

Kealey is a Jones Lecturer at Stanford University, where he was a Stegner Fellow from 2001 to 2003. He received his MFA in creative writing from the University of Massachusetts Amherst, where he was awarded the Distinguished Teaching Award in 2001.

== Bibliography ==
- Thieves I've Known (2013), a story collection from the University of Georgia Press, 2013
- The Creative Writing MFA Handbook (Continuum Publishing, February 2006).

=== Other publications and awards ===
- "Arrowhead", online story written with Chris Baty.
- "Nobody" at The Rumpus
- "826 Valencia Days"
- Coyotes (manuscript) won the 2005 Joseph Henry Jackson Award from the San Francisco Foundation.
