= Gail Galloway Adams =

American short story writer, and editor

- Born: 1943 (age 82–83)
- Occupation: writer
- Awards: Flannery O'Connor Award for Short Fiction

Gail Galloway Adams (born 1943) is an American short story writer, and editor.

Adams grew up in Central Texas, and taught at West Virginia University, retiring in 2008. She edited Arts & Letters. Her work appeared in Kenyon Review, The Georgia Review, North American Review, Story Quarterly.

She lives in Morgantown, West Virginia.

== Awards ==
- 1988 Flannery O'Connor Award for Short Fiction
- 1994 West Virginia Professor of the Year from the Carnegie Foundation for the Advancement of Teaching

== Works ==
- The Purchase of Order. University of Georgia Press. 1995. ISBN 978-0-8203-1734-2.

=== Anthologies ===
- Michael Pettit, ed. (1996). "Hunger". The Writing Path 2: Poetry and Prose from Writers' Conferences. University of Iowa Press. ISBN 978-0-87745-548-6.
- Charles East, ed. (1993). "Inside Dope". The Flannery O'Connor Award: Selected Stories. University of Georgia Press. ISBN 978-0-8203-1524-9.
