= Dianne Nelson =

American short story writer (born 1954)

- Born: 1954 (age 71–72); Utah, U.S.
- Education: Arizona State University
- Occupation: Short story writer

Dianne Nelson Oberhansly (born 1954) is an American short story writer.

She was raised in Nevada, Kansas, and Arizona, and graduated from Arizona State University with a B.A. and M.F.A. She has taught widely in public schools and private writing workshops. She married Curtis Oberhansly, who is a founding director of Boulder Community Alliance.

== Awards ==
- 1993 Flannery O'Connor Award for Short Fiction

== Works ==
- A brief history of male nudes in America. University of Georgia Press. 1993. ISBN 978-0-8203-1571-3. "Dianne Nelson."
- Downwinders: An Atomic Tale. Black Ledge Press. 2001. ISBN 978-0-9707965-9-2.
