= Antonya Nelson =

American novelist (born 1961)

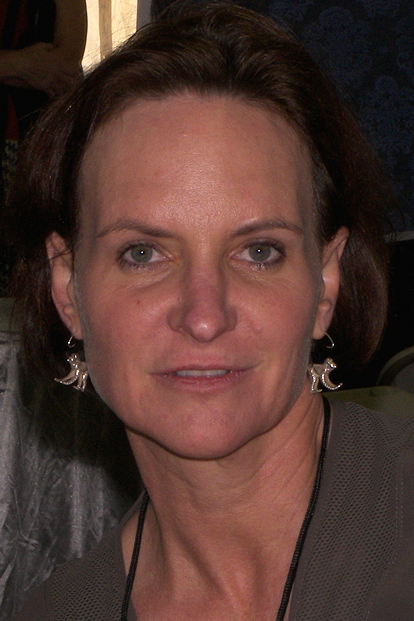
- Nelson at the 2009 Texas Book Festival
- Born: January 6, 1961 (age 65); Wichita, Kansas, U.S.
- Education: University of Kansas (BA); University of Arizona (MFA)
- Occupations: Author; educator

Antonya Nelson (born January 6, 1961) is an American short story writer, novelist, and creative writing professor known for her psychological explorations of daily life. She wrote the novels Nobody’s Girl (1999), Living to Tell (2001), Bound (2011), and, most recently, published her collection of short stories Funny Once (2014). Her work has been published in The New Yorker, Harper's, Redbook, Esquire and many more. She was included in The New Yorker's 1999 list as one of the “twenty young fiction writers for the new millennium”.

== Early life and education ==
Antonya Nelson was born in Wichita, Kansas on January 6, 1961. Growing up in a household filled with literature, she was encouraged at a young age to read widely. Her parents’ book collection was open to her as a young girl. She was exposed to diverse literary voices with novels like Valley of the Dolls and Emma.

Both of her parents were professors of literature at Wichita State University. Her mother also writes fiction. They were activists and friends with notable writers such as Allen Ginsberg. Ginsberg wrote poems set in their hometown of Wichita, Kansas. According to Nelson in an interview with Missouri Review, the girl in "Wichita Vortex Sutra" was written partly inspired by Nelson herself.

She has four siblings, three brothers and a sister, and is the oldest among them. She is the only writer and professor among them. Two of her siblings studied to become psychologists. Initially, Antonya Nelson felt called to become a writer as it was encouraged by her parents, and because she is skilled in reading and writing.

In 1983, Nelson graduated from the University of Kansas with her BA in English Literature and a minor in Art History. She received her Master of Fine Arts (MFA) in Creative Writing where she studied with accomplished writers and began focusing on her personal career at the University of Arizona in 1986.

In her early twenties, she won the Mademoiselle young writers' contest and had her story published. In an interview with Atlantic Unbound, she described this moment as a "breakthrough" for her as a writer.

== Career ==
After graduation, in 1989, Nelson was an Assistant Professor of English at New Mexico State University until 1995. She was promoted to Associate Professor in 1995 and held that position at New Mexico State University until the year 2000. From the year 2000 to 2006, she was an official Professor of English at New Mexico State University.

She had a literary agent after graduate school after being referred to one by one of her professors at the University of Arizona. Later, another writer and friend, David Foster Wallace, referred his own literary agent to Nelson and she has been working together with that agent since.

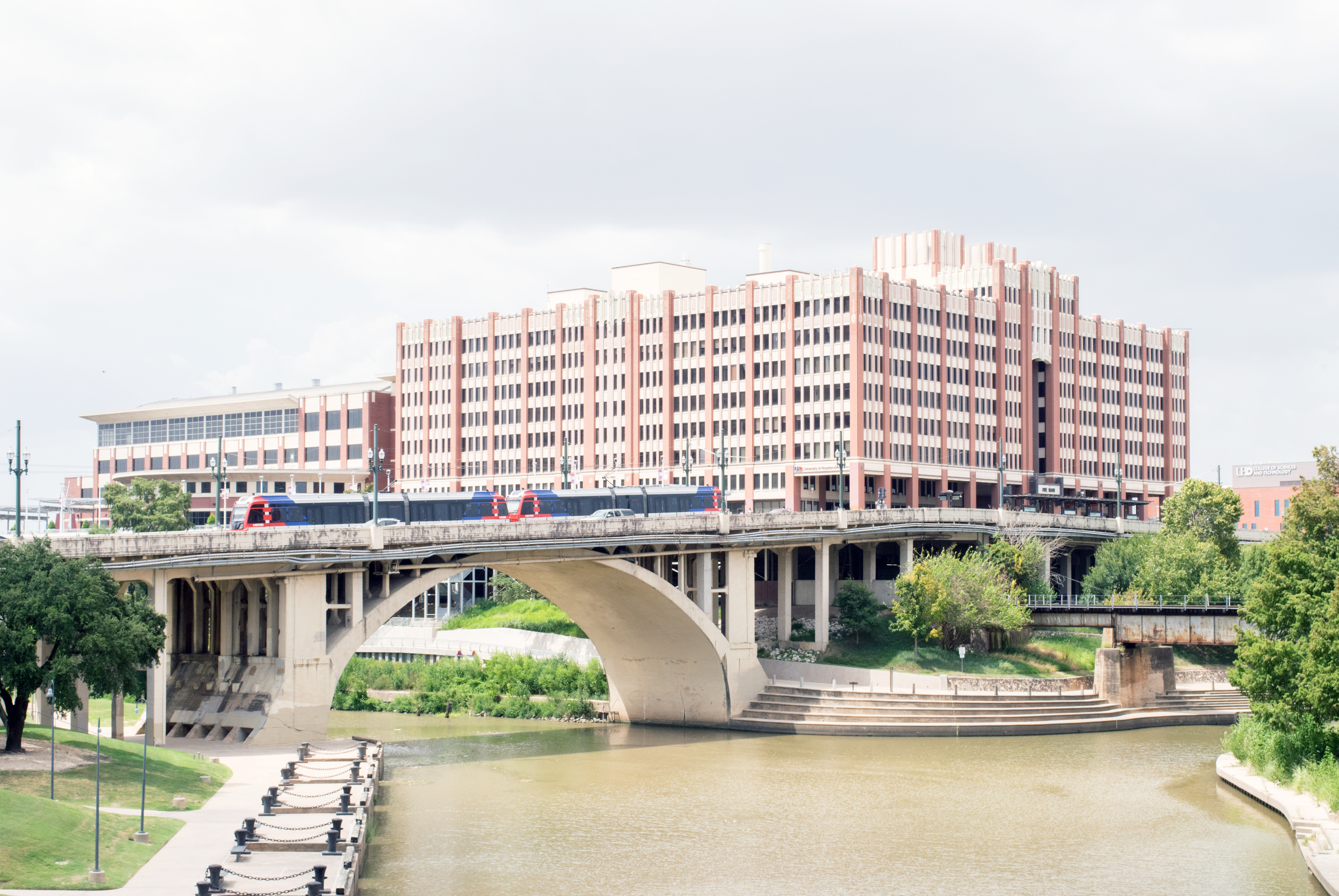
University of Houston, Downtown Campus

She became a faculty member in 1994 at Warren Wilson College in Swannanoa, North Carolina, and still holds that position currently.

In 2002, Antonya Nelson left New Mexico State University and became a professor and joined the faculty as a creative writing professor at the University of Houston in Houston, Texas. She maintains this position today.

Between the years 2007 and 2014 she was a Writer at Large for Texas Monthly.

Nelson conducts writing workshops for her students at the University of Houston. Her mentorship and guidance helps influence many young writers develop their own creative voices, but also inspires Antonya Nelson herself.

Nelson's short stories have appeared in Esquire, The New Yorker, Quarterly West, Redbook, Ploughshares, Harper's, and other magazines. They have been anthologized in Prize Stories: The O. Henry Awards and Best American Short Stories.

Her published works of fiction range from short stories to novels, shifting between the two styles as her interests require. Her debut collection of short stories, The Expendibles (1990), received the Flannery O’Connor Award. It was also chosen by judge Raymond Carver as the first-prize winner in American Short Fiction in 1988.

In 1999, Nelson & her husband guest-edited American Short Fiction’s magazine together.

Her short story "Chapter Two" was published in The New Yorker's March 26, 2012 publication. This short story appeared in her finalized short story collection “Funny Once: Stories” that came out in 2014.

Several of her novels have been New York Times Book Review Notable Books: In the Land of Men (1992), Talking in Bed (1996), Nobody's Girl: A Novel (1998), Living to Tell: A Novel (2000), and Female Trouble (2002).

For a 1999 issue on The Future of American Fiction, The New Yorker magazine selected Nelson as one of "the twenty best young fiction writers in America today".

Nelson wrote her novel, Nobody’s Girl (1999), with the intention of transforming typical endings to genre novels like romance or mystery into something different. She incorporates both plots into her novel and defies stereotypes. The novel was originally called Sadness, but as the story expanded she changed the name.

Living to Tell (2001) is a novel by Nelson that takes place in Wichita, Kansas, where she grew up. The story takes place in a house that is inspired by Nelson’s childhood home.

Her 2002 collection of short stories, Female Trouble, was written over the course of eight years.

Her novel Bound was published in 2010. It was inspired by the BTK ("bind, torture, kill") serial killer who terrorized her hometown. Bound was one that she felt would be a novel. it is a flashback-style novel, also known as analepsis. The BTK showed up and disappeared in her hometown while she was an adolescent. Nelson wanted to write a story including all the details of the murderer’s life and how they intertwined with her own. One example she mentions in an interview is how the BTK attended one of her mother’s colleague’s classes. The novel itself blends psychological insight with narrative momentum and was widely reviewed for its look at marriage, memory, and identity.

In 2016, she taught a fiction workshop for the Aspen Summer Words Conference.

== Writing style ==
When writing, Nelson will transform characters if they feel too familiar, like changing gender or relationship, or location of the story. She calls this "torqueing".

Nelson writes from emotional standpoints on close relationships of all kinds, her early stories focusing on family dynamics. Primum Non Nocere, for example, is about a young girl and her mother who is a psychotherapist. For inspiration for novels, she has talked about how she studies people and considers why each person acts the way that they do.

She feels as though it is important to pull inspiration from her personal life for details such as characters, and settings, but doesn’t like to be autobiographical as it limits her writing process. She says if a final work became too close to reality, it would “stop [her] from being incapable of writing something.”

She has stated that for her writing process, a book is finished only if Nelson is no longer interested in expanding on the psychology of her characters. Only then will her books appear published and in stores.

In an interview conducted by Iowa City UNESCO City of Literature “Writers On the Fly”, she is asked if her short stories are entirely fiction or partly autobiographical. She replies: “in a way that dreams are real to the dreamer, the fiction is real to me”.

Nelson describes her writing and editing process as a coexistence of processes. She looks at it as something to be entertained by, something that she likes to experience by reading out loud. She prefers to write in private, waking up in the middle of the night to do so or leaving the house when she has an idea.

While teaching, she takes notes and works on drafts of short stories and typically comes out with one or two in the fall or winter months. If working on a novel, Nelson takes the summer break to work on those as they declare more time.

== Personal life ==
In 1984 she married fellow writer and teacher of creative writing, Robert Boswell. They met while both attending the University of Arizona. They have two kids together, both of them also passionate about the arts.

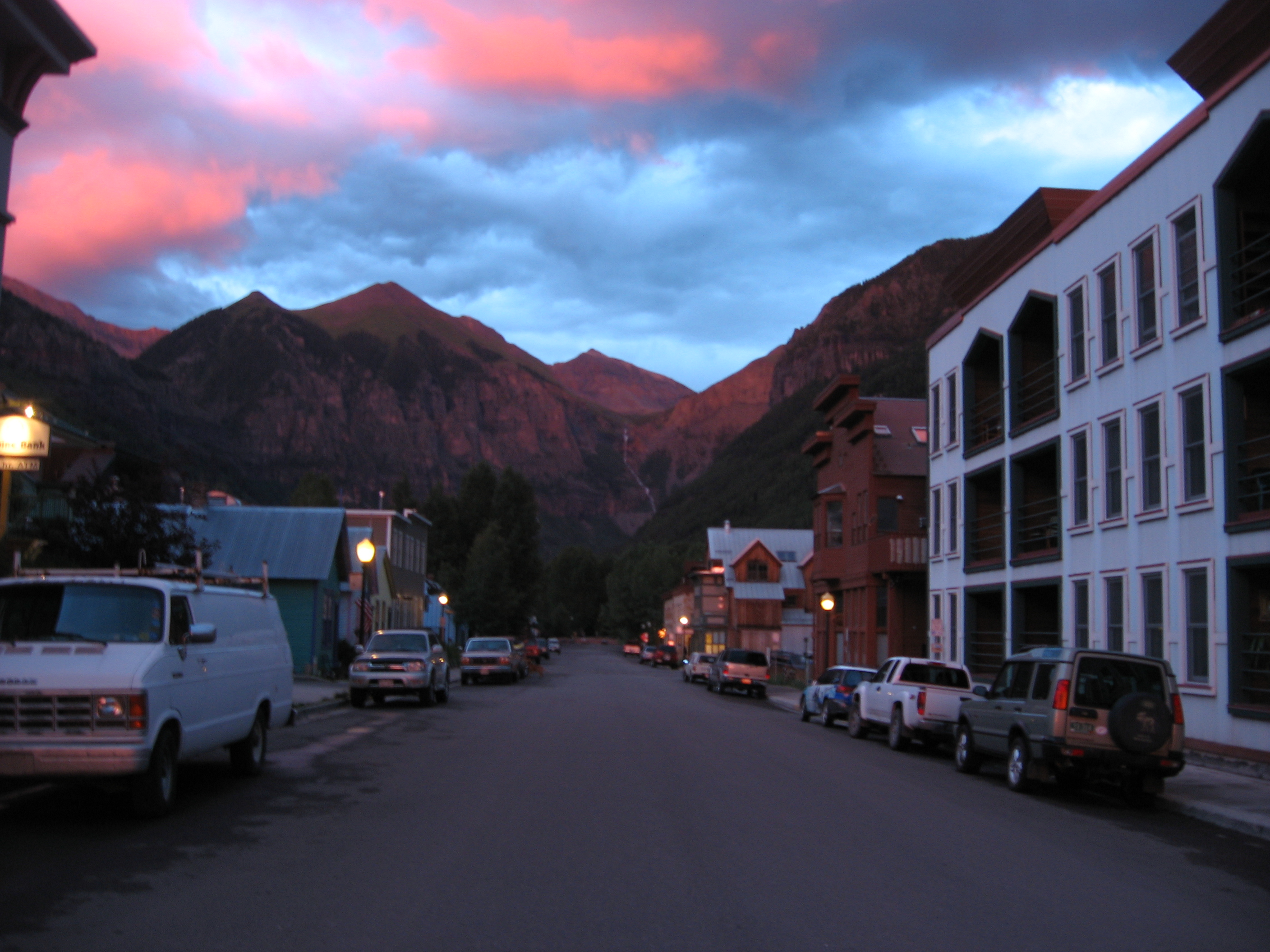
Downtown Telluride, Colorado

Both Nelson and her husband share the Cullen Endowed Chair in Creative Writing at the University of Houston. They frequently collaborate together on workshops and editing projects.

She lives and separates her time between three different states: Telluride, Colorado; Las Cruces, New Mexico; and Houston, Texas. She spends most of her time writing in the summer in Colorado, where she has spent summers since she was young.

She and her husband have become owners of three blocks of the town of Telluride, CO.

== Awards and honors ==
- David Patrick Scholarship for Excellence in Graduate Studies, 1984
- University of Arizona Mademoiselle Magazine Fiction Award, 1984
- Minnie Torrance Scholarship for Fiction, 1985
- U. of AZ 9 Bread Loaf Scholar PEN Syndicated Fiction Project Winner, 1985
- Illinois Arts Council Fellowship, 1987
- PEN Syndicated Fiction Project Winner, 1987
- Flannery O'Connor Award for Short Fiction, 1988
- University of Georgia Press, 1988
- Nelson Algren Award (Runner Up)
- First Prize, American Fiction '88 Contest, Ray Carver, Judge
- First place, Tucson Weekly annual fiction contest, 1988
- Wallace Stegner Fellowship in Fiction, 1989
- National Endowment for the Arts Literary Fellowship, 1989
- PEN Syndicated Fiction Project Winner, 1990
- Prairie Schooner Readers' Choice Award, 1990
- Inclusion in Prize Stories: The O. Henry Awards, 1992.
- John Gardner Fellow at Bread Loaf Writers' Conference, 1992
- New York Times Notable Book, In the Land of Men., 1992
- Inclusion in Best American Short Stories, 1993.
- Inclusion in Prize Stories: The O. Henry Awards 1993.
- Inclusion in Selected Shorts, 1993: A Celebration of the Short Story. At Symphony Space in New York City.
- Selected by Granta as one of America's fifty best novelists under the age of forty, 1995.
- Winner of The Heartland Award for Talking in Bed (awarded by the Chicago Tribune), 1996.
- Talking in Bed named one of the Top Ten Books of Fiction, Detroit Free Press, 1996.
- New York Times Notable Book, Talking in Bed, 1996
- Inclusion in Best American Short Stories, 1998.
- Distinguished Visiting Professor in Creative Writing, 1998
- WSU Inductee, 1998
- Authors of the Pass, 1998
- El Paso Area Authors’ Hall of Fame New York Times Notable Book, Nobody’s Girl., 1998
- Named one of twenty American fiction writers for the new millennium by the New Yorker magazine, 1999
- Share Our Strength’s Award of Excellence in the Literary Professional category, 1999
- John Simon Guggenheim Fellowship, 2000
- New York Times Notable Book, Living to Tell., 2000
- Living to Tell, American Library Association Notable Book of the Year, 2001
- Inclusion in Prize Stories: The O. Henry Awards, 2001.
- Branigan Library Book of the Year, Las Cruces, NM, 2001, Living to Tell.
- New York Times Notable Book, Female Trouble., 2002
- San Francisco Chronicle’s Best One Hundred Books of 2002, Female Trouble, 2002
- The Rea Award for the Short Story ($30,000 award for a body of work), 2003
- Finalist, National Magazine Awards, Fiction. The New Yorker, “Or Else., 2008
- United States Artists Fellow, (selected as one of 50 artists from all disciplines; $50,000.00 prize), 2009.
- New York Times 100 Notable Books 2009, Nothing Right., 2009
- Kansas Library Association Book Award (for Nothing Right), 2010
- New York Times 100 Notable Books 2010, Bound
- Kansas Library Association Book Award (for Bound), 2011

== Selected works ==
=== Novels ===
- (1998) [1996]. Talking in Bed. New York: Scribner. ISBN 978-0-395-68678-2
- (1999) [1998]. Nobody's Girl: a Novel. New York: Scribner. ISBN 978-0-684-85207-2.
- (2001) [2000]. Living to Tell: a Novel. New York: Scribner. ISBN 978-0-7432-0060-8.
- (2010) Bound. New York: Bloomsbury USA. ISBN 978-1-59691-575-6.

=== Short fiction ===
Collections

- (1999) [1990] The Expendables. New York: Simon & Schuster. ISBN 978-0-684-84685-9.
- (1999) [1992]. In the Land of Men: Stories. New York: Scribner. ISBN 978-0-684-84686-6.
- (1996) [1994]. Family Terrorists. New York: Scribner. ISBN 978-0-684-80224-4.
- (2003) [2002]. Female Trouble New York: Scribner. ISBN 978-0-7432-1872-6.
- (2006). Some Fun. New York: Scribner. ISBN 978-0-7432-1874-0.
- (2009). Nothing Right. New York: Bloomsbury USA. ISBN 978-1-59691-574-9.
- (2014). Funny Once. New York: Bloomsbury USA. ISBN 978-1-62040-861-2.

==== Stories (Note: Short stories unless otherwise noted.) ====
Title	Year	First published	Reprinted/collected	Notes
First husband	2014	Nelson, Antonya (January 6, 2014). "First husband". The New Yorker. Vol. 89, no. 43. pp. 56–61.		
Primum Non Nocere	2014	Nelson, Antonya. (November 10, 2014). "Primium Non Nocere". The New Yorker. November 10, 2014 issue.		
Chapter Two	2012	Nelson, Antonya. (March 26, 2012). "Chapter Two". The New Yorker. March 26, 2012 issue.		
Literally	2012	Nelson, Antonya (December 3, 2012). "Literally". The New Yorker. Vol. 88, no. 38.		
Shauntrelle	2007	Nelson, Antonya (July 23, 2007). "Shauntrelle". The New Yorker. Vol. 89, no. 21. pp. 66–73.		
