= Sandra Thompson (writer) =

Sandra Thompson (born Chicago) is an American novelist, short story writer, essayist and memoirist.

== Life ==
She was raised in Park Ridge, Illinois. She graduated from Ohio Wesleyan University, and from Brooklyn College with an MFA, where she studied with Jonathan Baumbach. She taught at the University of South Florida and at New College of Florida.

She began her career at Magazine Management Co. in New York as editor of True Secrets. She was an editor, writer and columnist for the St. Petersburg Times. She was nominated for the Pulitzer Prize .

She lives in Tampa, Florida, with her husband Chris Sherman; her daughter, Alex, lives in New York City.

== Awards ==
- 1984 Flannery O'Connor Award for Short Fiction

== Works ==
- Close-Ups. New American Library. 1985. ISBN 978-0-452-25682-8.
- Wild Bananas. Atlantic Monthly Press. 1986. ISBN 978-0-87113-032-7.

=== Memoir ===
- "Dot, a Life,"

=== Anthologies ===
- Christine Blackwell; Philip F. Deaver; Stephen Caldwell Wright, eds. (2000). The Orlando Group and Friends: A Collection of Writings and Art. Arbiter Press. ISBN 978-0-9621385-2-2.
