= Colorado Review =

Literary magazine published by Colorado State University

- Winter 2011 cover
- Editor: Stephanie G’Schwind
- Categories: Literary magazine
- Frequency: Triannual
- Publisher: Center for Literary Publishing, Colorado State University
- First issue: 1956
- Country: United States
- Language: English
- Website: coloradoreview.colostate.edu/colorado-review/
- ISSN: 1046-3348
- OCLC: 12603424

Colorado Review is a literary journal established in 1956. It is published three times a year—in March, July, and November—by the Center for Literary Publishing at Colorado State University.

== History and profile ==
R. Collins ("Jay Pell") and John Lewis were the founding editors of Colorado Review (then The Colorado Review) in 1956, succeeded by F.M. Latiolais in 1958. The magazine went on hiatus until 1966, when it was reintroduced as Colorado State Review and edited by Peter Reardon from 1966-67, Charles Robinson from 1967-68, and Nicholas Crome from 1968-69. After another hiatus, Wayne Ude and William Tremblay renewed the publication in 1977, with Ude coediting until 1984 and Tremblay editing until 1992. The name was changed to Colorado Review in 1985. David Milofsky was editor-in-chief from 1992 until 2003.

Stephanie G'Schwind has served as editor-in-chief since 2003.

The magazine presents the annual Colorado Prize for Poetry, the Mountain/West Poetry Series, and formerly the Nelligan Prize for Short Fiction (2004-2022).

Past Nelligan Prize winners are Mike Murray (2022), Danny Thiemann (2021), Josie Sigler Sibara (2020), Bryna Cofrin-Shaw (2019), Shannon Sweetnam (2018), Katie M. Flynn (2017), Farah Ali (2016), Luke Dani Blue (2015), Amira Pierce (2014), Edward Hamlin (2013), Matthew Shaer (2012), Joan Leegant (2011), Katherine Hill (2010), Angela Mitchell (2009), Ashley Pankratz (2008), Thomas Grattan (2007), Lauren Guza (2006), Dylan Landis (2005), and Emily Bloch (2004).

Authors published in the magazine include Anthony Cody, Alex Ohlin, Aimee Nezhukumatathil, Sherwin Bitsui, Jehanne Dubrow, Monica Macansantos, Lance Olsen, Chet’la Sebree, Sarah Curtis, Kazim Ali, Craig Morgan Teicher, Jessica Treadway, Matthew Gavin Frank, and Erika Krouse.

== See also ==
- List of literary magazines
