= Mary Engelbreit =

American artist (born 1952)

- Born: June 5, 1952 (age 74); St. Louis, Missouri
- Spouse: Phil Delano
- Website: www.maryengelbreit.com

Mary Wayne Engelbreit (born June 5, 1952) is an artist whose illustrations have been printed in books, cards and calendars.

== Early life ==
She was born and lives in St. Louis, Missouri. Her parents were Robert E. Engelbreit, who worked at a factory making children's clothes, and Mary Lois Stedelin.

Engelbreit attributes her beginnings in art to getting eyeglasses in second grade and being able to see details of the world around her clearly for the first time. After meeting her first artist, at age 9, she became convinced she needed her own studio space, which her mother helped set up in the family linen closet.

== Career ==
Engelbreit began working for a local advertising company, Hot Buttered Graphics. Hoping to work as an illustrator of children's books, she shopped her portfolio around New York without success. She began working on greeting cards and her first nationally distributed greeting card featured a spoonerism that played off an old saying, "Life is just a bowl of cherries", showing a girl looking at a chair piled high with bowls, with the legend: "Life is just a chair of bowlies."

Her company, Mary Engelbreit Co., was founded in 1982. It was located in Webster Groves, Missouri and then was moved to a former Greek Orthodox church in University City, Missouri in 1994. As of 1996, her company reported $86 million in sales per year. Mary Engelbreit stores were located in St. Louis; Schaumburg, Illinois; Dallas, Texas; Denver, Colorado; and Alpharetta, Georgia.

As her card line grew in size and popularity, it drew attention from other companies who licensed her artwork on products including calendars, T-shirts, mugs, gift books, rubber stamps, ceramic figurines, and fabric. She launched a line of "Engeldark" greeting cards in 2016 that feature snarky humor.

Engelbreit was editor-in-chief of a bi-monthly creative lifestyle magazine, Mary Engelbreit's Home Companion, starting in 1996.

Mary Engelbreit's A Merry Little Christmas received a starred review from Kirkus Reviews. Two of her books, Mary Engelbreit's Mother Goose and A Night of Great Joy, received starred reviews from Publishers Weekly. She has had two New York Times children's bestsellers, including an edition of The Night Before Christmas that reached #5 on the New York Times bestseller list and Mary Engelbreit's Mother Goose, which debuted at #6 and was on the bestseller list for four weeks.

She has designed sets for the St. Louis Muny's production of Matilda in 2019.

== Personal life ==
Engelbreit married Phil Delano, a social worker, in 1977; in 1986, they formed Mary Engelbreit Studios. The couple had two children: Evan, born in 1980; and Will, born in 1983. Evan died in June 2000; his daughter, Mikayla, was adopted by Engelbreit and her husband. Engelbreit has a star on the St. Louis Walk of Fame.

Engelbreit supports Black Lives Matter. She created art inspired by the mother of Michael Brown.

== Selected works ==
=== Adults ===
- Mary Engelbreit's Christmas Companion. Andrews McMeel, 1995. ISBN 978-0-8362-4627-8
- Mary Engelbreit: The Art and the Artist. By Mary Engelbreit and Patrick T. Regan. Andrews McMeel Publishing, 1996. ISBN 9780836222326
- Mary Engelbreit's Fan Fare Cookbook: 120 Family Favorite Recipes. Andrews McMeel, 2010. ISBN 9780740779695

=== Children ===
- My Symphony. W. H. Channing and Mary Engelbreit. Andrews McMeel Publishing, 1997. ISBN 978-0-8362-3674-3
- Believe: A Christmas Treasury. Andrews and McMeel, 1998. ISBN 0-8362-6762-1.
- Baby Booky: Booky. HarperFestival, 2002. ISBN 978-0-06-008133-1
- Baby Booky: Lovey Dovey. HarperFestival, 2002. ISBN 978-0-06-008134-8
- The Night Before Christmas. Written by Clement C. Moore; Illustrations by Mary Engelbreit. HarperCollins, 2002. ISBN 0-06-008160-0
- Queen of Christmas. HarperCollins, 2003. ISBN 978-0-06-008177-5
- Queen of the Class. HarperCollins, 2004. ISBN 978-0-06-008178-2
- Queen of Hearts. HarperCollins, 2004. ISBN 0-06-008181-3
- Mary Engelbreit's Mother Goose. HarperChildren's, 2005. ISBN 978-0-06-082399-3
- Queen of Easter. HarperCollins, 2006. ISBN 0-06-008184-8
- Mary Engelbreit's Nutcracker. Harper, 2011. ISBN 978-0-06-088579-3
- Peace on Earth: A Christmas Collection. Zonderkidz, 2013. ISBN 978-0-310-74340-8
- The Blessings of Friendship Treasury. Zonderkidz, 2014. ISBN 978-0-310-74509-9
- A Night of Great Joy. Zonderkidz, 2016. ISBN 978-0-310-74354-5
- Mary Engelbreit's A Merry Little Christmas. HarperCollins, 2006. ISBN 0-06-074158-9; HarperFestival, 2019. ISBN 978-0-06-074161-7.
- Mary Engelbreit's Little Book of Love. HarperCollins, 2020. ISBN 978-0063017221.
