= Daniel Scott (writer) =

American novelist and short story writer (born 1963)

- Scott in 2010
- Born: November 17, 1963 (age 61); Milton, Massachusetts, U.S.
- Occupation: Author
- Spouse: Dennis Raverty

Website
- danielscottonline.com

Daniel Scott (born November 17, 1963) is an American novelist and short story writer best known for his discussions of marginalized characters of American society. He has also been cited as an "almost post-gay" writer in that he sometimes employs gay characters whose sexuality is not necessarily a driving force of the story. Scott has been the recipient of awards from various organizations including the Christopher Isherwood Foundation, the New York Foundation for the Arts and the MacDowell Colony. Born November 17, 1963, in Milton, Massachusetts, he currently lives in New York City.

== Books ==
His first book, Some of Us Have to Get Up in the Morning, a collection of short stories, was published in 2001. His second book, Pay This Amount, another collection, was published in 2008. His third is a novel titled Valedictory that was released in 2015. Scott's work has also been anthologized, most recently in Best Gay Stories 2016.

== Bibliography ==
- Some of Us Have to Get Up in the Morning ISBN 1-885586-21-3
- Pay This Amount ISBN 0-9674922-1-1
- Valedictory ISBN 978-0-9915622-9-9
