= Alfred DePew =

American journalist

Alfred DePew is an American-born Canadian short story writer, and journalist.

== Life ==
He grew up in St. Louis. He taught at Maine College of Art. He lived in Portland, Maine. In 2007, he moved to Vancouver. He writes for the Vancouver Observer.

== Awards ==
- 1990 Flannery O'Connor Award for Short Fiction

== Work ==
- A Wedding Song for Poorer People. Mixed Messages Press. 2014-11-15. ISBN 978-0990768005.
- Wild and Woolly: A Journal Keeper's Handbook. Dog Star Press. 2006-01-01. ISBN 978-1-929565-09-2.
- The Melancholy of Departure. University of Georgia Press. March 1992. ISBN 978-0-8203-1405-1.
