= The Southern Review =

American literary magazine

- Winter 2013 cover
- Editor: Sacha Idell, Jessica Faust
- Categories: Literary magazine
- Frequency: Quarterly
- Publisher: Louisiana State University Press
- First issue: 1935
- Website: www.thesouthernreview.org
- ISSN: 0038-4534
- OCLC: 473100598

The Southern Review is a quarterly literary magazine that was established by Robert Penn Warren in 1935 at the behest of Charles W. Pipkin and funded by Huey Long as a part of his investment in Louisiana State University. It publishes fiction, poetry, critical essays, and excerpts from novels in progress by established and emerging writers and includes reproductions of visual art. The Southern Review continues to follow Warren's articulation of the mission when he said that it gives "writers decent company between the covers, and [concentrates] editorial authority sufficiently for the journal to have its own distinctive character and quality".

== History ==
An earlier Southern Review was published in Charleston, South Carolina from 1828 to 1832. A second The Southern Review was published by Albert Taylor Bledsoe in Baltimore from 1867 to 1879.

The initial staff consisted of editor-in-chief Charles W. Pipkin, Robert Penn Warren and Cleanth Brooks as managing editors, and Albert Erskine as business manager. In 1942, after 28 issues, publishing was interrupted and restarted again in 1965. Past editors-in-chief and co-editors have been Albert R. Erskine Jr., Lewis P. Simpson, Donald E. Stanford, James Olney, Fred Hobson, Dave Smith, Bret Lott, Jeanne M. Leiby, Cara Blue Adams, and Emily Nemens. The co-editors as of August 2018 are Sacha Idell and Jessica Faust.

=== Reception ===
In 1936, shortly after the journal's founding, poetry editor Morton D. Zabel credited The Southern Review with "a competence almost unrivaled at the moment in American letters." In 1941, on the occasion of the journal's 5th anniversary, John Crowe Ransom stated "The Southern Review's five year achievement is close to the best thing in the history of American letters."

=== Timeline ===
- 1935: The Southern Review is established. The first issue includes work by Wallace Stevens, Randall Jarrell, Ford Madox Ford, Katherine Anne Porter, and Aldous Huxley.
- 1942: Publication suspended due to World War II.
- 1965: Lewis P. Simpson and Donald E. Stanford relaunch the magazine.
- 1983: James Olney joins Lewis P. Simpson as co-editor.
- 1987: Fred Hobson joins James Olney as co-editor.
- 1990: Dave Smith joins James Olney as co-editor.
- 2004: Bret Lott assumes editorship.
- 2006: The magazine wins first place for Best Journal Design in the CELJ International Awards Competition.
- 2008: Jeanne M. Leiby becomes editor
- 2011: Jessica Faust and Cara Blue Adams become co-editors.
- 2013: Emily Nemens joins Jessica Faust as co-editor.
- 2018: Sacha Idell joins Jessica Faust as co-editor.

== See also ==
- List of literary magazines
