= Jessica Treadway =

American short story writer (born 1961)

- Born: 1961 (age 64–65); Albany, New York, U.S.
- Education: State University of New York at Albany
- Occupation: short story writer
- Notable work: Please Come Back To Me, short stories, University of Georgia Press, October 2010; Absent Without Leave, a collection of stories, Delphinium Books/Simon & Schuster, 1992; And Give You Peace, a novel, Graywolf Press, 2000
- Partner: Philip Holland
- Awards: National Endowment for the Arts; Massachusetts Cultural Council.; 1993 John C. Zacharis First Book Award; 2009 Flannery O'Connor Award for Short Fiction

Jessica Treadway (born 1961 Albany, New York) is an American short story writer.

== Life ==
She was raised in Albany, New York. She graduated from the State University of New York at Albany, and from Boston University, with an MA. She worked as a reporter for United Press International. She held a fellowship at the Bunting Institute of Radcliffe College, and taught at Tufts University. She teaches at Emerson College.

Her fiction has been published in The Atlantic, Ploughshares, The Hudson Review, Glimmer Train, AGNI, Five Points.

She wrote the libretto for composer Ellen Bender’s opera after Nathaniel Hawthorne’s The Marble Faun, and served as literary co-translator of “A Crowning Experience” by Kostiantyn Moskalets in From Three Worlds: New Writing From the Ukraine. She is on the Board of Directors of PEN-New England.

She lives in Lexington, Massachusetts with her husband, Philip Holland.

== Awards ==
- National Endowment for the Arts
- Massachusetts Cultural Council.
- 1993 John C. Zacharis First Book Award
- 2009 Flannery O'Connor Award for Short Fiction

== Works ==
- Please Come Back To Me, short stories, University of Georgia Press, October 2010
- Absent Without Leave, a collection of stories. Delphinium Books/Simon & Schuster. 1992. ISBN 978-0-671-79213-8.
- And Give You Peace, a novel. Graywolf Press. 2000. ISBN 978-1-55597-315-5.

=== Anthologies ===
- The Best American Short Stories
- The O. Henry Prize Stories
- Bill Henderson, ed. (December 2003). The Pushcart Prize XXVIII: Best of the Small Presses. Pushcart Press. ISBN 978-1-888889-37-6.
