= Don Lee (author) =

American writer

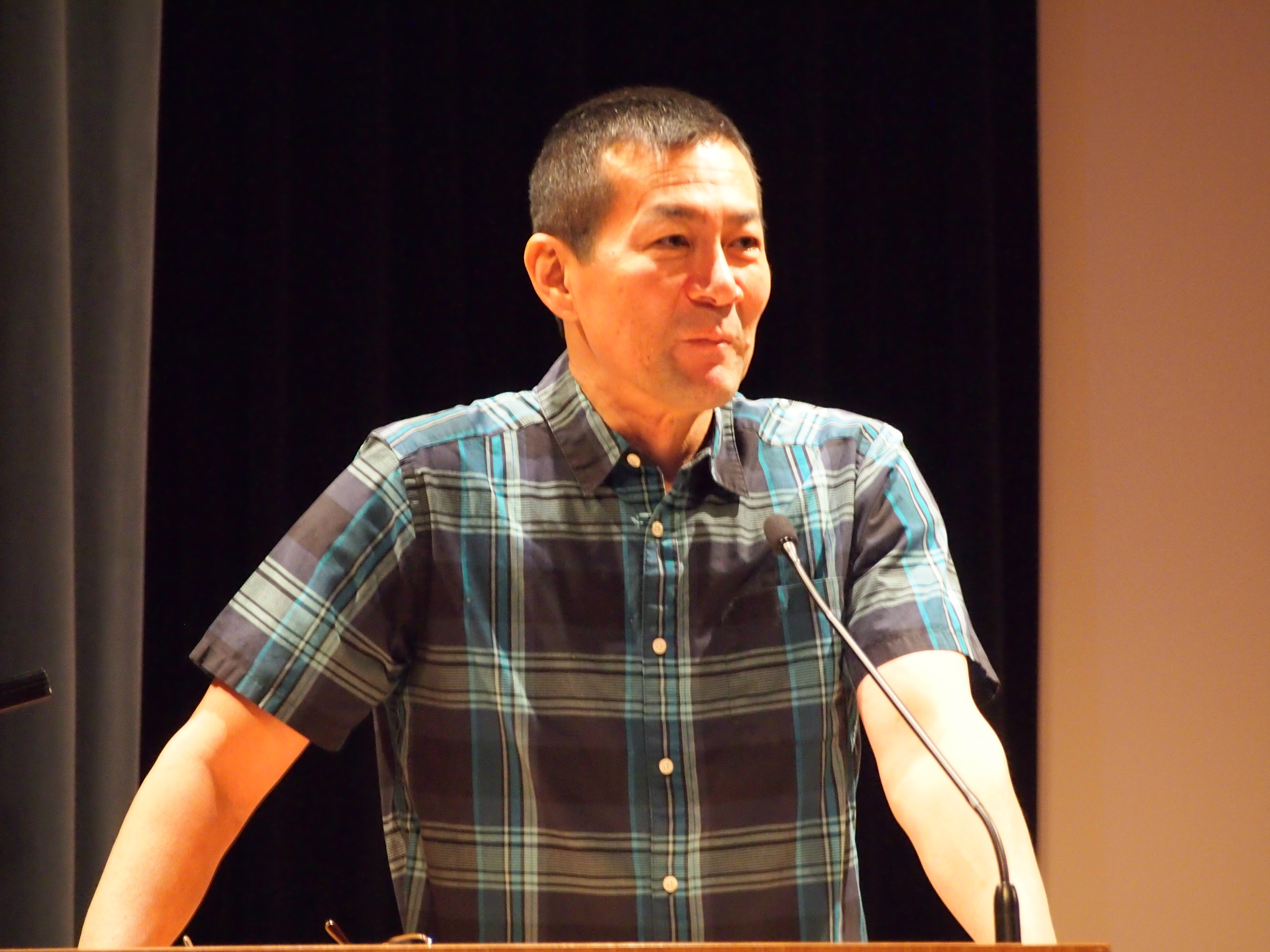
- Lee in 2017
- Born: 1959 (age 66–67)
- Education: University of California, Los Angeles (BA); Emerson College (MFA)
- Occupations: Writer, creative writing professor
- Writing career
- Period: Late 20th and early 21st century
- Genre: Literary fiction
- Notable work: Yellow
- Website: don-lee.com

Don Lee (born 1959) is an American novelist, fiction writer, literary journal editor, and creative writing professor.

The son of a State Department officer, Lee—a third-generation Korean American—spent his childhood in Tokyo (where he attended ASIJ, or the American School in Japan) and Seoul. He received his B.A. in English Literature from University of California, Los Angeles (UCLA) and his M.F.A. in Creative Writing and Literature from Emerson College.

After graduating with his M.F.A. degree, Lee taught fiction writing workshops at Emerson College for four years as an adjunct instructor, then began working full-time at the literary journal Ploughshares. He has also served as the primary editor of the literary journal Ploughshares for 17 years from 1988 to 2007. He was also an occasional writer-in-residence in Emerson's M.F.A. program and a visiting writer at other colleges and universities.

Lee's earlier work has appeared in GQ, New England Review, American Short Fiction, Kenyon Review, and Glimmer Train, with Voir Dire anthologized in Charlie Chan Is Dead 2. For his short fiction, Lee also received an O. Henry Award (for his short story "The Possible Husband") and a Pushcart Prize (for his short story "The Price of Eggs in China"). Lee has also received fellowships from the Massachusetts Cultural Council and the St. Botolph Club Foundation, and residencies from Yaddo and the Lannan Foundation. In 2007, Lee received the inaugural Fred R. Brown Literary Award for emerging novelists from the University of Pittsburgh's creative writing program.

Lee was formerly a faculty member of the Creative Writing department at Macalester College from 2007 to 2008. In the fall of 2008, Lee moved to the faculty of Western Michigan University in Kalamazoo, Michigan, where he taught both graduate and undergraduate courses as an associate professor in the graduate Creative Writing program. He is currently in the faculty of the Creative Writing program at Temple University, where he founded TINGE Magazine, an online literary journal run by graduate students. He served as the director of the M.F.A. (Master of Fine Arts) program in Creative Writing at Temple University from 2011 to 2013.

Lee has also served as an independent consultant for the literary journals Bamboo Ridge, The Georgia Review, The New England Review, Agni, and the Council of Literary Magazines and Presses (CLMP).

== Work ==
His first collection of short stories, Yellow, documents the lives of various Asian American characters living in the fictional town of Rosarita Bay. Yellow won the Sue Kaufman Prize for First Fiction from the American Academy of Arts and Letters and the "Members Choice Award" from the Asian American Writers' Workshop.

He followed that collection with his first novel, Country of Origin, which earned an American Book Award, a Mixed Media Watch Image Award for Outstanding Fiction, and an Edgar Award for Best First Novel.

In 2008, Lee finished writing his second novel, Wrack and Ruin. The book, which revisits Rosarita Bay, was published by W.W. Norton in April 2008, and was also a finalist for the Thurber Prize.

In 2012, Norton published Lee's third novel, The Collective. The novel won the 2013 Asian/Pacific American Award for Literature from the Asian Pacific American Librarians Association.

== Bibliography ==
=== Short story collection ===
- Yellow (2001)
  - Winner, Sue Kaufman Prize for First Fiction from the American Academy of Arts and Letters
  - Winner, Members Choice Award from the Asian American Writers' Workshop
- The Partition (2022)

=== Novels ===
- Country of Origin (2005)
  - Winner, Edgar Award for Best First Novel
  - Winner, American Book Award
  - Winner, Mixed Media Watch Image Award for Outstanding Fiction
- Wrack and Ruin (2008)
  - Nominee, Thurber Prize
- The Collective (2012)
  - Winner, Asian/Pacific American Award for Literature from the Asian Pacific American Librarians Association

=== Short stories ===
- "The Price of Eggs in China", The Gettysburg Review, Spring 2000
  - Winner of the Pushcart Prize in 2000
- "Voir Dire", Glimmer Train - also anthologized in Charlie Chan Is Dead 2 (2004)
- "El Niño", GQ, October 1989, Vol. 59 Issue 10, p. 224
- "The Lone Night Cantina", Ploughshares, Fall 1987
- "Casual Water", The New England Review, Vol. 17, No. 2 (1995)
- "Domo Arigato", The New England Review, Vol. 22, No. 1 (2001)
- "The Possible Husband", Bamboo Ridge, No. 79 (2001)
  - O. Henry Award Selection - See The O. Henry Prize Stories 2002 Edited by Larry Dark
- "Yellow", American Short Fiction, 1995
- "Abercrombie & Fitch", Failbetter, Spring 2004
