= Matthew Neill Null =

American writer (born 1980s)

- Born: West Virginia, United States
- Education: Iowa Writers' Workshop (MFA)
- Occupation: Writer
- Writing career
- Period: Reconstruction era, Gilded Age, Progressive Era
- Genres: Historical fiction, Realism
- Subject: Appalachian culture
- Notable works: Honey from the Lion and Allegheny Front
- Notable awards: O. Henry Prize, Pushcart Prize
- Website: matthewneillnull.com

Matthew Neill Null is an American writer, the author of the novel Honey from the Lion and the short story collection Allegheny Front. His fiction has received the O. Henry Prize and the Pushcart Prize and has been praised for its spare prose and for doing "for Appalachia what Cormac McCarthy does for the American West". He is Associate Professor of Creative Writing at Susquehanna University.

== Early life and education ==
Null was born in West Virginia. He received a Master of Fine Arts in fiction from the Iowa Writers' Workshop, after which he was a fellow with the Fine Arts Work Center in Provincetown, Massachusetts.

== Career ==
Null is an Associate Professor of Creative Writing at Susquehanna University.

Null's short stories have appeared in Ploughshares, American Short Fiction, Ecotone, Oxford American, and Electric Literature, and in the anthologies PEN /O. Henry Prize Stories, The Pushcart Prize: Best of the Small Presses, and The Best American Mystery Stories. Electric Literature described Null as "a master of understanding how people are shaped and made by the places they come from, how it affects their voice, their outlook, and their relationships."

In 2011, Null's short story "Something You Can't Live Without" won the O. Henry Prize. In 2023, Null's short story, "The Dropper," published in The Kenyon Review, won a Pushcart Prize.

=== Honey from the Lion (2015) ===
Null's debut novel, Honey from the Lion, was published by Lookout in 2015. Set in the period between the American Civil War and the turn of the 20th century, it follows reactions in a West Virginia Alleghenies community to a logging company's destruction of 10,000 acres of virgin forest, leading to calls for a union strike among the timber workers.

Foreword Reviews wrote, "Null establishes himself as a writer with a rich prose style and a flair for world building worthy of a genre novelist . . . What really makes the book work is the supporting cast and the interesting backstories they include: the shifting loyalties, the world weariness, the loss of faith in institutions."

The novel was shortlisted for the L. D. and LaVerne Harrell Clark Fiction Prize.

=== Allegheny Front (2016) ===
Null's collection of nine stories, Allegheny Front, was published by Sarabande Books in 2016. Some of the stories, including "In the Second District," "Natural Resources," and "The Slow Lean of Time," took from a range of influences among which were Isaac Babel, Primo Levi, Eudora Welty, and Henry Green.

The Rumpus compared the collection to Honey from the Lion, stating that "like the novel, Allegheny Front runs its fingers virtuosically across the keyboard of West Virginia's history, lighting on two centuries' worth of farmers and drovers, hunters and fishermen, scientists, poachers, preachers, and criminals." The review further noted how Null placed the opening short story, "Something You Can't Live Without," in the tradition of the "drummer tales" by Flannery O'Connor and William Faulkner.

The Millions called it "a severe book [...] that doesn't trouble itself to protect the reader," adding that "Matthew Neill Null gives us a near-journalistic depiction of the violence men have wrought on nature and on themselves."

In 2017, Hobart Pulp wrote:

Matthew Neill Null said that he doesn't consider himself an explainer, and maybe he isn't. Maybe an explainer isn't even what American literature needs right now . . . Null takes the reader into the depths of West Virginia — a place that has become synonymous with the white working class anger that brought us to our current political moment — and he does not flinch when it comes to presenting it honestly, now and in earlier epochs. More than any other book that I read last year, his is the one that I find myself thinking about as America slides into an increasingly disturbing status quo.

The collection was a finalist for Foreword's INDIE collection of the year.

== Awards and honors ==
- 2011: O. Henry Prize
- 2017: Joseph Brodsky Rome Prize, awarded by the American Academy of Arts and Letters
- 2023: Pushcart Prize

== Bibliography ==
=== Novel ===
- Honey from the Lion. Lookout. 2015. ISBN 978-1940596082.
- Allegheny Front. Sarabande. 2016. ISBN 9781941411254.
