= Cornelia Nixon =

American novelist

- Born: March 25, 1947 (age 78) Boston, Massachusetts, U.S.
- Occupation: Novelist; short story writer; educator
- Education: University of California, Irvine (BA); San Francisco State University (MFA); University of California, Berkeley (PhD)
- Spouse: Dean Young (m. 1983–2010) Hazard Adams (m. 2015)

Cornelia Nixon (born March 25, 1947) is an American novelist, short-story writer, and teacher. She has lived much of her mature life in the San Francisco Bay Area.

== Early years and education ==
Cornelia Nixon was born in Boston, Massachusetts, on March 25, 1947. She attended the University of California, Irvine, where she earned a BA in English with a creative writing emphasis, having been influenced by the fiction of Albert Camus in high school and that of D. H. Lawrence in college. She received an MFA from San Francisco State University and a PhD from the University of California, Berkeley.

== Career ==
Nixon taught at Indiana University, Bloomington, Indiana, from 1981 to 2000, and then joined the faculty at Mills College, Oakland, California. She retired from teaching in 2016.

Nixon wrote two unpublished novels before becoming assistant professor at Indiana University. Her first published book was Lawrence's Leadership Politics and the Turn Against Women, a critical essay that examined what Nixon saw as the change in gender power dynamics between D. H. Lawrence's The Rainbow and Women in Love, a supposed sequel The Rainbow.

In 1991, Nixon wrote Now You See It, a novel in stories. It was very favorably reviewed by Michiko Kakutani in The New York Times, by Richard Locke in The Wall Street Journal, in The Chicago Tribune, and Entertainment Weekly. In 2000, Nixon published Angels Go Naked, a collection of interrelated short stories that form a larger narrative. It was reviewed in The New York Times Book Review.

Nixon's novel Jarrettsville was released on October 1, 2009, and was reviewed unfavorably in The New York Times, as well as favorably in The Washington Post, Kirkus Reviews, Publishers Weekly, and San Francisco Magazine. It won the Michael Shaara Prize for Excellence in Civil War Fiction, awarded by the Civil War Institute at Gettysburg College. In 2017 sociologist Clayton Childress published Under the Cover: The Creation, Production, and Reception of a Novel, which used Jarrettsville as its focus in tracing a novel from inspiration through publication and then reception by reviewers and readers.

Nixon's fourth novel and fifth book, "The Use of Fame," was published by Counterpoint Press in May 2017.

Nixon has also contributed to periodicals such as the New England Review, the Iowa Review and Ploughshares.

== Personal life ==
Nixon was married to poet Dean Young from 1983 to 2010. In 2015, she married her former teacher and mentor at UC-Irvine, Hazard Adams. Dean Young died in 2022, and Hazard Adams died in 2023.

== Awards ==
- The 2024 Lascaux Review Prize for the Short Story, for "Lunch at the Blacksmith"
- The 2010 Michael Shaara Prize for Excellence in Civil War Fiction, awarded to her novel Jarrettsville
- First Prize O. Henry Award 1995
- O. Henry Award 1993
- Nelson Algren Award, Chicago Tribune (1988)
- Carl Sandburg Award in Fiction (1991)
- National Endowment for the Arts (1992)
- Pushcart Prizes in 1995 and 2003
- Carnegie Fellowship to the Mary Ingraham Bunting Institute at Radcliffe 1986–87

== Works ==
- The Use of Fame, Counterpoint 2017
- Jarrettsville: A Novel. Counterpoint. 2009. ISBN 978-1-58243-512-1.
- Angels Go Naked*: A Novel, publisher Counterpoint, Paperback released November 2010
- Angels go naked. Counterpoint Press. 2000. ISBN 978-1-58243-062-1.
- *Now you see it*: a novel. Harper Perennial. 1992. ISBN 978-0-06-097472-5.
- *Now You See It*. Little, Brown. 1991. ISBN 0-316-61170-0.
- Lawrence's leadership politics and the turn against women. University of California Press. 1986. ISBN 978-0-520-05431-8.

=== Anthologies ===
- Bill Henderson, ed. (2003). Pushcart prize XXVII: best of the small presses. Pushcart Press. ISBN 978-1-888889-35-2.
- Prize Stories 1995: The O. Henry Awards, First Prize Winner. Ed. William Abrahams, Doubleday, 1995.
- Pushcart Prize XX: Best of the Small Presses (1995). Ed. Bill Henderson. Pushcart Press.
- William Abrahams, ed. (1993). Prize Stories 1993: The O. Henry Awards. Doubleday. ISBN 978-0-385-42531-5.
- Modern American Bestsellers, Moscow (in Russian), 2002.
- The Believer Book of Writers Talking to Writers. Ed. Vendela Vida. McSweeney's Press, 2007.
