= Padraig O'Malley =

Padraig O'Malley (born 1942 in Dublin, Ireland) is an Irish international peacemaker, author, and professor. O'Malley specializes in the problems of divided societies, such as South Africa and Northern Ireland. He has written extensively on these subjects and has been actively involved in promoting dialogue among representatives of differing factions. He is currently the John Joseph Moakley Distinguished Professor of Peace and Reconciliation at the University of Massachusetts Boston.

== Early life and education ==
O'Malley was born in Dublin. He was educated at University College, Dublin, and at Yale, Tufts and Harvard universities in the United States.

== Peace activism ==
=== Northern Ireland ===
O'Malley spent 20 years involved with the conflict in Northern Ireland. Working with all the political parties to the conflict, he convened the Amherst Conference on Northern Ireland (Massachusetts, 1975), the Airlie House Conference (Virginia, 1985), and co–convened the Arniston Conference with the government of South Africa (Western Cape, 1997).

In 1992, he participated in bringing some of the South African figures to Boston, Massachusetts for a meeting with representatives of the factions in Northern Ireland. In 1996, he helped arrange a second such meeting, in Belfast, attended by South Africans Cyril Ramaphosa of the African National Congress and Roelf Meyer of the white National Party.

In 1997, the Arniston Conference (also known as The Great Indaba) convened all the key parties of The Northern Irish peace process in South Africa to meet with Nelson Mandela. Included in the meeting from Northern Ireland were Martin McGuinness, David Trimble and Peter Robinson.

"The outcome of the Indaba (the Zulu word for "gathering of the minds") was a series of historic events. Seven weeks after the conference, Sinn Féin declared a cease fire that paved the way for negotiations and ultimately the fragile Good Friday Agreement to share power, still in place today. A year later, Trimble and John Hume, leader of the Social Democratic and Labour Party, were awarded the Nobel prize for peace. And most recently, in fall 2001, the IRA mustered the courage to destroy its weapons to further the cause of peace. That stunning announcement came two weeks after Gerry Adams of Sinn Féin once again visited former president Mandela in South Africa."

O'Malley was also a member of the Opshal Commission, which authored the report "Northern Ireland: A Citizens' Inquiry" (Belfast, 1993).

=== South Africa ===
Between 1989 and 1999, O'Malley conducted 2,000 hours of interviews tracking South Africa's transition to democracy. His work is archived in written transcription and on audio tape at the Robben Island Museum/Mayibuye Archives (at the University of the Western Cape). His assiduous work of recording the different perspectives and developing attitudes within South Africa during the ten-year period had earned Nelson Mandela's highest regard. What particularly impressed Mr. Mandela was O'Malley's determination to face the greatest challenge posed once upon a time by W.B. Yeats, namely 'to hold in a single thought reality and justice'.

=== Iraq ===
In 2007, based on his philosophy that cultures in conflict are in the best position to help other cultures in conflict, O'Malley became involved in working toward reconciliation within Iraq. He helped arrange a conference at a resort in Finland, where 16 Iraqis met senior negotiators from South Africa (SA), including Cyril Ramaphosa, chief negotiator for the African National Congress (ANC) under the leadership of Nelson Mandela; Roelf Meyer, chief negotiator for South Africa's last whites-only government and Mac Maharaj, who was co. secretary of the South African negotiating process. Senior negotiators from Northern Ireland (NI), including Martin McGuinness from Sinn Féin, currently Deputy First Minister of NI, Jeffrey Donaldson from the Democratic Unionist Party (DUP).

O'Malley's role included recruiting the Iraqi participants, then roaming around Baghdad with $40,000 in cash and covertly procuring their airline tickets. The Iraqis concluded the meeting by agreeing among themselves on a statement based partly on the Mitchell Principles developed during the Northern Ireland peace process. The Boston Globe reported:

There would be two meetings, Helsinki I and Helsinki II. "The participants in what O'Malley calls "Helsinki II" are an even more senior influential group than those who drafted the Helsinki principles. They include senior members of parliament and prominent tribal leaders. Among them is the head of the Iraqi Constitutional Review Committee, Sheik Humam Hamoudi, whose participation was endorsed by the speaker of the Iraqi parliament. The ethnic representation of the 36 at the meeting roughly reflects that of the Iraqi population, with 25 percent Sunni, 25 percent Kurdish, and 50 percent Shi'ite participation."

=== The Forum for Cities in Transition ===
O'Malley founded and is the Founding Director of the Forum for Cities in Transition, which brings together representatives from divided societies around the world. "Its guiding principle is that one divided society is in the best position to help another." Annual conferences were held from 2009 to 2013 with representatives from 15 cities.

=== The Global Alliance of Muslims for Equality (GAME) ===
O'Malley is the Founding Director of GAME, an organization of Muslim youth representatives from cities across Europe. It was started with an inaugural conference on October 17, 2017, at the Kippure Estate / Glencree Centre for Peace and Reconciliation, where 48 young Muslims from 12 countries wrote a charter of rights for young Muslims. GAME's mission is "to redress the false perceptions of Islam and challenge islamophobia through public forums, communal exchanges, education and dialogue."

== Additional professional life ==
At the University of Massachusetts Boston, he is the John Joseph Moakley Professor of International Peace and Reconciliation at the John W. McCormack Graduate School of Policy Studies and a Senior Fellow in the Center for Development and Democracy. He is also a visiting professor of Political Studies at the University of the Western Cape in South Africa.

He founded and edits the New England Journal of Public Policy, a semiannual publication of the McCormack Graduate School.

He is also a frequent contributor to The Boston Globe.

O'Malley has monitored elections in South Africa, Mozambique, and the Philippines on behalf of the National Democratic Institute for International Affairs.

He has owned the Plough and Stars pub in Cambridge, Massachusetts since the early 1970s. His brother Peter O'Malley, with DeWitt Henry, started the renowned literary magazine Ploughshares there, publishing it at first, out of the back of the bar.

== Honors and Media ==
O'Malley was honored with the Peace Abbey Foundation Courage of Conscience Award at the Community Church of Boston in 2018 for playing a major role in breaking the gridlock and promoting peace in South Africa, Northern Ireland, and the Middle East.

He is the subject of the 2016 documentary, The Peacemaker.

== Bibliography ==
=== Books authored ===
- Irish Industry: Structure and Performance (as Patrick O'Malley) (1971 ISBN 978-0-7171-0526-7 and ISBN 978-0-389-04453-6
- The Uncivil Wars: Ireland Today (1983, 1990, 1997) ISBN 978-0-85640-301-9 and ISBN 978-0-8070-0223-0 - won the Christopher Ewart-Biggs Memorial Prize
- Biting at the Grave: The Irish Hunger Strikes and the Politics of Despair (1990) ISBN 978-0-85640-453-5; paperback 1991 ISBN 978-0-8070-0209-4
- Northern Ireland: Questions of Nuance (1990) ISBN 978-0-85640-454-2
- The Point of No Return: The Politics of South Africa on Election Day April 1994 (published by the National Democratic Institute for International Affairs)
- Religion and Conflict: The Case of Northern Ireland (1995)
- Shades of Difference: Mac Maharaj and the Struggle for South Africa (2007) (foreword by Nelson Mandela) ISBN 978-0-670-85233-8
- The Two-State Delusion: Israel and Palestine - A Tale of Two Narratives (2015) ISBN 978-0-670-02505-3
- Perils and Prospects of a United Ireland (2023) ISBN 978-1843518518

=== Books edited ===
- The AIDS Epidemic: Private Rights and the Public Interest (1989) ISBN 978-0-8070-0601-6
- Homelessness: New England and Beyond (1992) ISBN 978-0-87023-825-3
- Uneven Paths: Advancing Democracy in Southern Africa (1994)
- Sticks & Stones: Living With Uncertain Wars (2006) (co-edited with Paul L. Atwood and Patricia Peterson) ISBN 978-1-55849-535-7
