= Alice Elliott Dark =

American writer

Alice Elliott Dark is a writer of short stories, novels and essays. She is the author of the story collections Naked to the Waist and In the Gloaming and the novels Think of England and Fellowship Point, published by Scribner/Marysue Rucci Books in July 2022.

== Early life and education ==
She was born Alice Elliott Kirby in Philadelphia and grew up in Bryn Mawr, Pennsylvania, where she attended the Shipley School. She attended Kenyon College and the University of Pennsylvania, where she earned a bachelor's degree in Chinese studies. She started out as a poet and earned a masters of fine arts from Antioch, producing the chapbook This Is My Gun, Clyde as her thesis.

== Career ==
Dark's novel Fellowship Point (Scribner/Marysue Rucci Books) was published to critical acclaim on July 5, 2022. The novel is set primarily on Fellowship Point, a pristine coastal Maine peninsula. It tells the story of how a lifelong friendship between two women in their 80s, Agnes Lee and Polly Wister, is tested when Agnes suggests they dissolve the joint ownership of the point by the two of them and one other shareholder and donate it to a land trust to protect it from development.

Think of England, her first novel, was published by Simon & Schuster in 2002.

The short story "In the Gloaming" was published in The New Yorker in 1993 and was selected by John Updike for inclusion in the Best American Short Stories of the Century. It also was included in The Best American Short Stories 1994, as selected by Tobias Wolff. "In the Gloaming" was made into an HBO film starring Glenn Close and directed by Christopher Reeve.

Dark's short story "Watch the Animals", published in Harper's Magazine, was awarded an O. Henry Award in 2000. She has published stories in Doubletake, Five Points, Ploughshares, A Public Space, and Redbook. Her essays and reviews have appeared in publications such as The New York Times, The Washington Post, and Harper's Bazaar, and she is a frequent contributor of essays on a wide range of subjects to several anthologies.

Dark is the recipient of an NEA grant and has taught at the Writer's Voice in New York City, Bard College, Manhattanville College, Barnard College, and Rutgers University. She lives in New Jersey with her husband Larry Dark, formerly the series editor for Prize Stories: The O. Henry Awards and currently director of The Story Prize, an annual book award for short story collections. She also has a son Asher Dark.

She is an associate professor at Rutgers University-Newark.
