= Debra Spark =

American writer

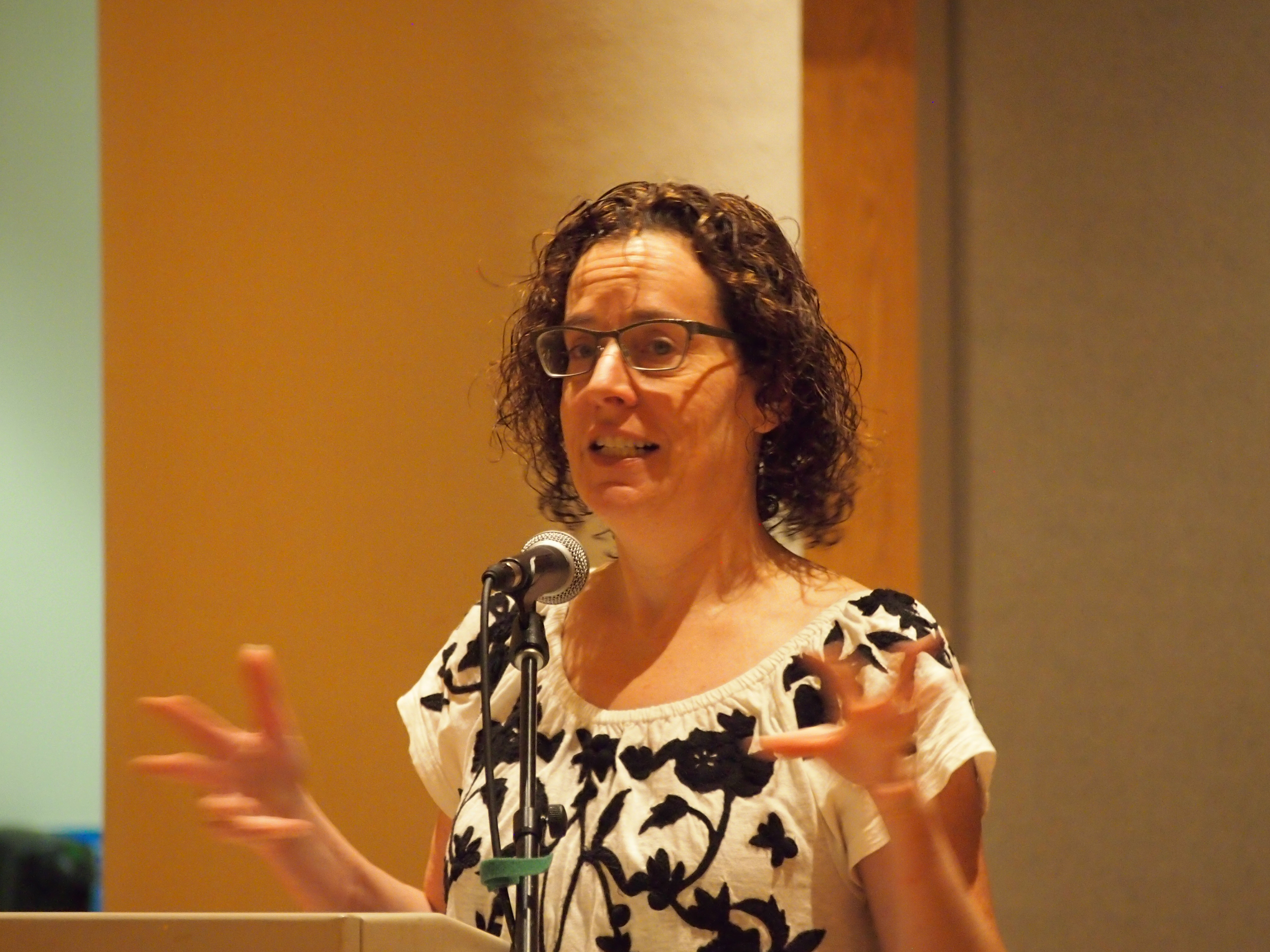
- Born: 1962 (age 63–64); Boston, Massachusetts
- Education: Yale University
- Occupation: professor
- Writing career
- Genres: novel, short story, essay
- Notable awards: John C. Zacharis First Book Award

Debra Spark (born 1962) is an American novelist, short story writer, essayist, and editor. She teaches at Colby College and at Warren Wilson College.

== Biography ==
Debra Spark was born in Boston, Massachusetts in 1962. She graduated from Yale University. Her work has appeared in AGNI, Esquire, Narrative, Ploughshares, The New York Times, Food and Wine, Yankee, Down East, The Washington Post, Maine Home + Design and The San Francisco Chronicle.

She lives with her husband and son in North Yarmouth, Maine.

== Awards ==
- 1995 John C. Zacharis First Book Award
- National Endowment for the Arts fellowship
- Bunting Institute fellowship from Radcliffe College

== Works ==
- And Then Something Happened: Essays on Fiction Writing. Engine Books. 2020. ISBN 9781938126468.
- Unknown Caller. Louisiana State University Press. 2016. ISBN 9780807164693.
- The Pretty Girl. Four Way Books. 2012. ISBN 9781935536185.
- Good for the Jews. University of Michigan Press. 2009. ISBN 978-0-472-11711-6.
- Curious Attractions: Essays on Fiction Writing. University of Michigan Press. 2005. ISBN 978-0-472-06897-5.
- "The Revived Art of the Toy Theatre", AGNI 58. 2003.
- The Ghost of Bridgetown. Graywolf Press. 2001. ISBN 978-1-55597-352-0.
- Coconuts for the Saint. HarperCollins Publishers. 1996. ISBN 978-0-380-72630-1.

=== Anthologies ===
- Julie Checkoway, ed. (2001). "The Trigger: What Gives Rise to a Story?". Creating fiction: instruction and insights from teachers of the Associated Writing Programs. Writer's Digest Books. ISBN 978-1-884910-51-7.
- Alan Kaufman, ed. (1987). The New generation: fiction for our time from America's writing programs. Anchor Press/Doubleday. ISBN 978-0-385-23952-3.
- Wesley McNair, ed. (2005). "A Short Wedding Story". Contemporary Maine fiction: an anthology of short stories. Down East Enterprise Inc. ISBN 978-0-89272-693-6.
- DeWitt Henry, ed. (2002). "Last Things". Sorrow's Company: Great Writers on Loss and Grief. Beacon Press. ISBN 978-0-8070-6237-1.

=== Editor ===
- Debra Spark, ed. (1986). 20 under 30: best stories by America's new young writers. Scribner's. ISBN 978-0-684-18640-5.
