= Hot Tamale Brass Band =

American brass band

Background information
- Origin: Boston, Massachusetts
- Genres: Brass band / Dixieland
- Years active: 1992 – present
- Label: CL10
- Members: Leader / Snare drum: Mickey Bones; Bass drum: Ted Larkin; Sousaphone: Phil Johnson; Trombones: John Faieta, Bryan MacMartin; Saxes: Scott Shetler, Gordon Beadle, Timo Shanko; Trumpets: Scott Aruda, Taylor Ho Bynum; Clarinet: Mark Chenevert
- Website: HotTamaleBrassBand.com

Hot Tamale Brass Band is a brass band that plays traditional New Orleans jazz, Dixieland, jazz funeral and funky second line music. The band is based in the Boston area and has nine full-time members, sometimes performing as small as a quintet, other times with as many as 42 members for a Disney special event.

== History ==
The Hot Tamale Brass Band was formed in 1992 after their leader, Mickey Bones, moved from New Orleans to Boston. The band took up Sunday residency for the next three years at The Plough and Stars in Cambridge, Massachusetts to build a local fan base and develop new material.

== Performances ==
The Hot Tamale Brass Band have performed in venues including the Krewe of Bacchus Mardi Gras parade in New Orleans, the Museum of Fine Arts, Boston, the Cambridge River Festival, the Somerville Theater, First Night Boston, the Berklee Performance Center. They participated in a "party crash" of the activist HONK! festival parade in 2008. The group are known for performing concerts for the Boston Red Sox at Fenway Park for every home game since the year 2000, over 800 performances.

The band occasionally dress in black suit and tie to perform a New Orleans style jazz funeral. The band needs no amplification so the mobility of the group has allowed them to perform in unusual venues including while propelled by scullers up the Charles River, and on the back of a fire truck in downtown Boston.

The band has appeared on Sesame Street, Nickelodeon, the 2005 remake of Fever Pitch by the Farrelly brothers, and were filmed for Ken Burns's Baseball-10th Inning documentary.

== Discography ==
- Live at the Shrunken Head (1999)
- Live at the Screaming Torso (2009)
- Live at the Ballpark (2010)
