= The Plough and Stars =

Bar and music venue in Cambridge, Massachusetts

Coordinates: 42°22′5.9″N 71°6′31.4″W

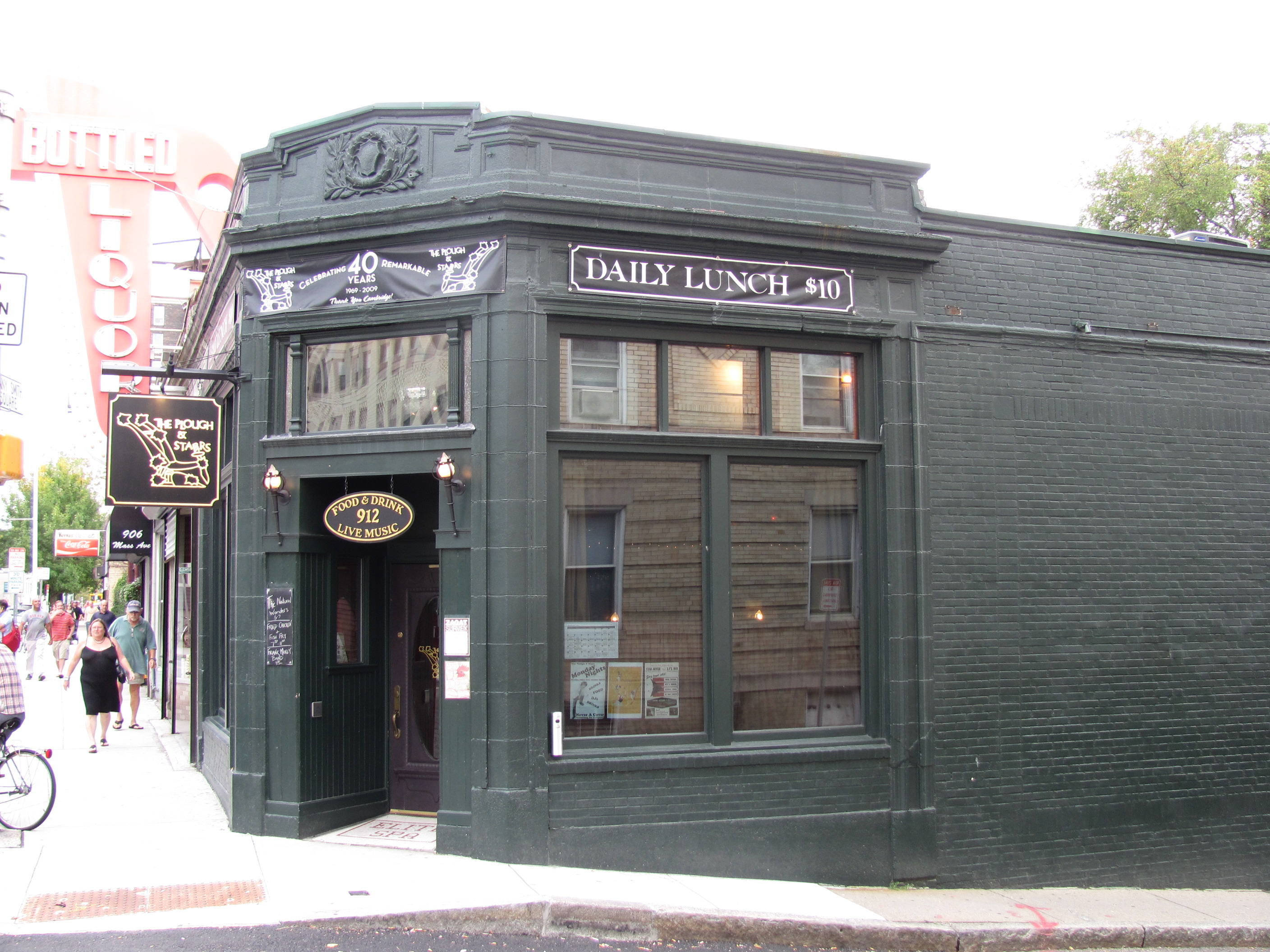
The Plough and Stars

The Plough and Stars is a bar and music venue in Cambridge, Massachusetts. It was founded in 1969 by brothers Peter and Padraig O'Malley, named after the play of the same name by Seán O'Casey. The Boston Globe and Boston Phoenix have noted its disproportionate cultural influence for its size, with a number of noted musicians, writers, and politicians frequenting the bar over the years.

== Ploughshares ==
The literary journal Ploughshares is named for the bar, where it was founded in 1971 by DeWitt Henry and former bartender/owner Peter O'Malley.

== Notable patrons ==
- Jarrett Barrios, politician and former employee
- Mickey Bones, musician
- Dana Colley, musician
- Lawrence Ferlinghetti, poet, activist, and co-founder of City Lights Booksellers & Publishers
- J. Geils Band members
- Seamus Heaney, poet
- DeWitt Henry, author and founder of Ploughshares
- John Hume, politician
- Javier Juarez, Activist
- David Mamet, writer and director
- Paul H. Patterson, scientist
- Bonnie Raitt, musician
- Kenneth Reeves, politician
- Philip Roth, author
- Mark Sandman, musician
