= Rental House =

2024 novel by Weike Wang

- Author: Weike Wang
- Language: English
- Genre: Literary fiction
- Set in: Cape Cod, Catskill Mountains
- Publisher: Riverhead Books
- Publication date: December 3, 2024
- Publication place: United States
- Pages: 224
- ISBN: 9780593545546

Rental House is a 2024 novel by Weike Wang. Released on December 3, 2024 under Riverhead Books, the novel follows a Chinese American couple, Keru and Nate, during two vacations dividing the book into two halves. The first half is set in a rented cottage on Cape Cod with the couple's families visiting and the second five years later at a rented bungalow in the Catskill Mountains. Rental House is Wang's third novel following her 2022 release, Joan Is Okay, and her 2017 debut, Chemistry.

== Background ==
Rental House is the first novel by Wang that is told in the third person and contains no protagonist. Instead, the narrative shifts between Keru and Nate. Like her other novels, this novel explores themes of American immigrants and pressures to live up to parental expectations. Her novels are characterized by the use of deadpan jokes, which are also present in this novel.

== Critical reception ==
Los Angeles Times writer Leigh Haber called the book "one of the most nuanced, astute critiques of America now I’ve read in years" and "frequently hilarious". She calls the commentary on the isolation experienced in Asian American immigration and the class disparity within the Chinese diaspora "adept". Kirkus Reviews writes that Wang is an "incisive writer with sharp psychological insight" while praising the novel's dialogue and calling the novel "subtle and powerful in its cultural critique". John Warner, writing for the Chicago Tribune, says that the author is "three for three on delivering sharp, funny, sneakily emotional stories" and that the book is "driven by Wang’s devastating deadpan wit" and is "truly a marvel". Writing for the San Francisco Chronicle, Alexis Burling praised Wang as "an eagle-eyed chronicler of the human condition" and called her discussion of societal issues in America "equally adept" as her description of the obliviousness people have with noticing their offensive behavior.

In a review for The Washington Post, Porter Shreve calls the novel "funny, deceptively keen and artful" and says that the overly staged houses gives the book a "quiet depth and sadness" with its lack of personality. In an article for The New York Times, author Alexandra Kleeman calls the structure "elegantly off-kilter" with a "disruptive quality" that "peel back the layers of the central relationship". Carol Iaciofano Aucoin of WBUR-FM writes that "no character is shrunk down to a caricature" in the novel and called the use of flashbacks "affecting" and the book "a wise and bittersweet tale". Aucoin also writes that the parents of the couple can seem "too vivid", making the couple "insubstantial".

Rhoda Feng of The Boston Globe criticized the novel's characters, calling them "ghostly vacationers who show themselves quickly out the door". She says that unlike the author's prior works, Rental House is "rarely enlivened with humor or wit" and called the use of third person narration "rote" and having a "clocklike regularity".
