= Robin Oliveira =

American historical novelist and nurse

- Born: 1954 (age 71–72); Albany, New York, U.S.
- Education: University of Montana (BA); Vermont College of Fine Arts (MFA)
- Occupation: Author

Robin Oliveira (born 1954) is an American author, former literary editor, and nurse, who is most known for her debut novel, My Name is Mary Sutter, published in 2010. Her second novel, I Always Loved You, was published by Penguin on February 4, 2014.

== Early life ==
Robin Frazier Oliveira was born in Albany, New York in 1954, and grew up in nearby Loudonville, New York, graduating Shaker High School. She earned a Bachelor of Arts in Russian from the University of Montana in 1976, and continued her study at the Pushkin House Institute of Russian Literature in Moscow. After finding this wasn't a viable career path, she studied nursing, earning a living as registered nurse specializing in critical care and bone marrow transplant, in Seattle.

== Writing ==
Oliveira worked in nursing until the birth of her children, when she left work to stay home with them, but when her youngest son entered kindergarten, she decided to try to write a book instead of returning. She went back to school to earn a Master of Fine Arts in Writing from the Vermont College of Fine Arts in 2006. She served as assistant editor at Narrative Magazine, and from 2007 through 2011 as fiction editor for the annual literary magazine upstreet.

Oliveira began writing the novel that became My Name is Mary Sutter in 2002. It tells the story of an Albany midwife trying to become a surgeon during the American Civil War. At first, Oliveira admits, the writing wasn't very good, and her writing teacher doubted it could succeed. Rewriting took years, including traveling to Washington, D.C. for extensive research at the National Archives and the Library of Congress. In 2007, while still in progress, it won the James Jones First Novel Award under the working title The Last Beautiful Day.

My Name is Mary Sutter was published in 2010 by Viking Press in the United States (ISBN 0670021679) and the Fig Tree imprint of Penguin Books in the United Kingdom in 2011 (ISBN 978-1905490684). It was widely reviewed, mostly favorably, with reviewers commenting on the detailed research and the determined heroine. It won an honorable mention for the 2010 Langum Prize for American Historical Fiction, and won the 2011 Michael Shaara Award for Excellence in Civil War Fiction.

== Personal life ==
Oliveira lives just outside Seattle, Washington, with her husband Andrew. They have a daughter, Noelle, and a son, Miles.
