= Tarbox Ramblers =

US musical group

The Tarbox Ramblers are a Boston-based roots and Americana band. The band's sound originally centered on arrangements of early twentieth-century blues, gospel and Appalachian music. It later included bandleader Michael Tarbox's original songs. The group's albums on the Rounder label include a self-titled debut and a second release, A Fix Back East. The albums feature three-part vocal harmonies, a heavy rhythm section and the interplay of slide guitar and violin.

The original line-up with Robbie Phillips (washtub bass), J. Place (harmonica), Mickey Bones (drums, washboard and bones) and Michael Tarbox was formed in Cambridge, Massachusetts, in 1994.

The mid period group consisted of Tarbox (vocalist and guitarist), Daniel Kellar (violinist), Johnny Sciascia (upright bass fiddle), and Jon Cohan (drummer and percussionist). Since 2003 Nashville based musician, Scott McEwen plays (upright bass fiddle and percussion) with the Ramblers. Rob Hulsman (drums, Nine Pound Hammer) joined in 2003 and toured and recorded with the band through 2005.

Rounder Records released The Tarbox Ramblers' eponymous debut album in 2000. In summer 2001, Robert Plant contacted the group, to secure them as his opening act for his Boston appearance, and subsequently asked them to continue touring with him. They made the BBC's list of top CDs in 2002.

Tristram Lozaw, a reviewer from the Boston Herald, described the group as follows:

"If the Rolling Stones had happened 10 years earlier, hailed from Memphis and been produced by Ike Turner, they might have sounded like The Tarbox Ramblers. The way the Ramblers lay down their backroads grit and raw hillbilly-rock jive, you're unlikely to hear a more genuine blast of sandpaper rhythm and roots."

== Equipment ==
Michael Tarbox plays a Supro Lockola solid-body electric guitar in G Tuning (DGDGBD); an Airline Town and Country solid-body electric in D (DADF#AD); and an Epiphone acoustic or Gibson L-4CES hollow-body electric guitar in Standard Tuning (EADGBE). He uses Fender Deluxe and Supro amps in combination with a Premier reverb tank.

== Discography ==
- Tarbox Ramblers, Rounder Records, 2000
- A Fix Back East, Rounder Records, 2004
- Four From The West (limited edition live set) 2006
- First Songs/Gospel Cross (limited edition early recordings) 2010
- Songs For Robert Reuter (Live EP, recorded in December 2021) 2022

== Michael Tarbox's Solo work ==
Tarbox has worked as a solo artist throughout his career, often favoring a drum-guitar duo format. In 2010 he released his first solo album, My Primitive Joy. Produced by Scott McEwen at The Fry Pharmacy Studio in Old Hickory, TN, its spare arrangements, acoustic sound and lyrical approach stand in contrast to The Tarbox Ramblers' aggressive amplified sound. A second solo album was slated for release in 2012.

Tarbox's songs have been used in the television shows Sons of Anarchy and Supernatural. They include "Ashes To Ashes," "Already Gone," "Were You There?" and "No Harm Blues."

=== Solo Discography ===
- First Songs/Gospel Cross (limited edition early recordings), 2010
- My Primitive Joy, 2010
- Works And Days, 2013
- Paler Suns (cover song collection), 2020
- Two New Songs: Hey Mr. Starlight & Change My Ways, 2021
- Tarbox Ramblers, Songs For Robert Reuter, 2022
- Kingdom Come Blues (acoustic solo recording), 2022
- Careless Love (solo electric, 3 songs, recorded live with audience), 2023
- Hail Charlie Parker (single), 2023
