= Marie Jakober =

Canadian novelist (1941–2017)

Marie Jakober (August 27, 1941 – March 26, 2017) was a Canadian novelist.

Based in Calgary, Alberta, Jakober wrote historical fiction and fantasy. Sandinista: A Novel of Nicaragua (1985) won the Writer's Guild of Alberta Novel Award in 1985. She received the 2002 Michael Shaara Award for Excellence in Civil War Fiction for her novel Only Call Us Faithful (2002). Her second Civil War novel, Sons of Liberty, won the Georges Bugnet Award for Novel at the Alberta Book Awards in 2006.

== Bibliography ==
- The Mind Gods: A Novel of the Future (London: Macmillan, 1976; Toronto: Macmillan of Canada, 1976)
- Sandinista: A Novel of Nicaragua (Vancouver: New Star, 1985)
- A People in Arms (Vancouver: New Star, 1987)
- High Kamilan: A Novel (Calgary: Gullveig, 1993; republished as Even the Stones by Edge Science Fiction & Fantasy Publishing, 2004)
- The Black Chalice (Calgary: Edge Science Fiction and Fantasy Publishing, 2000)
- Only Call Us Faithful (New York: Forge, 2002)
- Even the Stones (Calgary: Edge Science Fiction and Fantasy Publishing, 2004)
- Sons of Liberty (New York: Forge, 2005)
- The Halifax Connection (Toronto: Random House Canada, 2007)
- The Demon Left Behind (Calgary: Edge Science Fiction and Fantasy Publishing, 2011)
