= Yellow (short story collection) =

- First edition
- Author: Don Lee
- Language: English
- Subject: Asian-American life
- Published: 2001 (Norton, New York)
- Publication place: United States
- Pages: 255
- ISBN: 9780393025620
- OCLC: 45162120

Yellow is a collection of short stories written by Korean-American novelist Don Lee. It contains eight stories set in the fictional California town of Rosarita Bay in which a variety of characters examine issues of what it means to be Asian in America.

This collection includes:

- The Price of Eggs in China
- Voir Dire
- Widowers
- The Lone Night Cantina
- Casual Water
- The Possible Husband
- Domo Arigato
- Yellow

== Critical reception ==
Yellow received positive reviews in both popular and academic circles. Publishers Weekly reviewer Jeff Zaleski comments that while many stories deal with difficult subjects, "Hatred and heartbreak...are mitigated by Lee's cool yet sympathetic eye and frequently dark sense of humor." Kathleen Snodgrass of The Georgia Review finds that many of the stories are driven by a male-female dynamic "in which the men tend to fall for women determined to domesticate and socialize them." She notes that, "Most often, racial differences and tensions are subsumed under a larger question of identity, especially as one's sense of self changes in a love relationship."
