= Ladette Randolph =

American author and editor

Ladette Randolph is an American author and editor.

== Career ==
Randolph is the author of five books: three novels: Private Way, Haven’s Wake and A Sandhills Ballad, a short story collection, This is Not the Tropics, and a memoir, Leaving the Pink House. She is the editor-in-chief of the literary journal Ploughshares at Emerson College and co-owner of the manuscript consulting firm Randolph Lundine. A long-time Nebraskan, she spent her childhood in the same part of west-central Nebraska where her family lived for five generations. She now lives in Boston with her husband Noel.

== Awards ==
Randolph is the recipient of four Nebraska Book Awards, a Rona Jaffe grant, a Pushcart Prize, a Virginia Faulkner award, and a citation from Best New American Voices.

== Works ==
- Private Way. University of Nebraska Press. 2022. ISBN 978-1-4962-3119-2
- Leaving the Pink House. University of Iowa Press. 2014. ISBN 978-1609382742.
- Haven's Wake. Bison Books. 2013. ISBN 978-0-8032-4357-6.
- Sandhill Ballad. University of Nebraska Press. 2009. ISBN 978-0-8263-4685-8.
- This Is Not the Tropics. Terrace Books. 2005. ISBN 978-0-299-21510-1.

=== Editor ===
- The Big Empty. University of Nebraska Press. 2007. ISBN 978-0-8032-9011-2.
- A Different Plain. University of Nebraska Press. 2004. ISBN 978-0-8032-9002-0.
