= American Short Fiction =

Literary magazine

- Spring 2010 cover
- Editors: Rebecca Markovits; Adeena Reitberger
- Categories: Literary magazine
- Frequency: Triannual
- Publisher: American Short Fiction, Inc.
- Founder: Laura Furman
- Founded: 1991
- Country: United States
- Based in: Austin, Texas
- Website: americanshortfiction.org
- ISSN: 1051-4813

American Short Fiction is a nationally circulated literary magazine founded in 1991 and based in Austin, Texas. Issued triannually, American Short Fiction publishes short fiction, novel excerpts, an occasional novella, and strives to publish work by both established and emerging contemporary authors. The magazine seeks out stories "that dive into the wreck, that stretch the reader between recognition and surprise, that conjure a particular world with delicate expertise—stories that take a different way home."

American Short Fiction sponsors two annual short fiction contests, the Halifax Ranch Fiction Prize judged in 2018 by ZZ Packer, and the American Short(er) Fiction Prize. The magazine also sponsors a reading series in Austin as well as online workshops for fiction writers.

== History and publication ==
Founded in 1991 by editor Laura Furman, American Short Fiction was published until 1998 by the University of Texas Press in cooperation with the Texas Center for Writers and National Public Radio's "The Sound of Writing" broadcast. During its initial run, the magazine was a two-time finalist for the National Magazine Award for fiction and contributors’ work was anthologized in The Best American Short Stories, The O. Henry Prize Stories, and The Pushcart Prize: Best of the Small Presses.

The journal was purchased in 2003 by Badgerdog Literary Publishing and released the first issue of its second run in Winter 2006. Following a hiatus in 2012, the magazine reorganized under current editors Rebecca Markovits and Adeena Reitberger, and is now published by the Austin, Texas-based non-profit American Short Fiction, Inc.

The journal maintains high standards for publication. In April 2017, Bret Anthony Johnston's story, "Half of What Atlee Rouse Knows About Horses" featured in American Short Fiction's 25th Anniversary Issue, won The Sunday Times EFG Short Story Award. Two recent stories, Danielle Evans's "Richard of York Gave Battle in Vain" and Kyle McCarthy's "Ancient Rome" have been chosen to appear in The Best American Short Stories 2017. Contributions have also been anthologized in The Best American Nonrequired Reading and have appeared in Best American Fantasy.

== American Short Fiction editors ==
- 1991–1994: Laura Furman
- 1994–1998: Joseph Kruppa
- 2005–2006: Rebecca Bengal
- 2006–2009: Stacey Swann
- 2009–2012: Jill Meyers
- 2013–present: Rebecca Markovits and Adeena Reitberger

== Past contributors ==
- Joyce Carol Oates
- Lydia Davis
- Bret Anthony Johnston
- Lauren Groff
- Laura van den Berg
- Don Lee
- Dagoberto Gilb
- Dan Chaon
- Louise Erdrich
- Ann Beattie
- Charles Baxter
- Ursula K. Le Guin
- Antonya Nelson
- Nathan Englander
- Benjamin Percy
- Vendela Vida
- Desmond Hogan
- Ander Monson
- Paul Yoon
- Jess Row
- Maud Casey
- Ethan Rutherford
- Karl Taro Greenfeld
- Patrick Somerville
- Josh Weil
- Matt Bell
- Mary Kay Zuravleff
- Andrea Barrett
- Alexander Chee
- Danielle Evans
- Jennifer DuBois
- Molly Antopol
- Kirstin Valdez Quade
- Carmen Maria Machado
- Brandon Hobson
- Rebecca Makkai
- Manuel Muñoz
- Elizabeth McCracken
- Jamel Brinkley
- Dave Eggers
- Alexander Chee
- Marie-Helene Bertino
- Jonathan Escoffery

== See also ==
- List of literary magazines
