= Michael Shaara Award for Excellence in Civil War Fiction =

The Michael Shaara Award for Excellence in Civil War Fiction is an annual literary award awarded to the writer of a work of fiction related to the American Civil War. The award was started by Jeffrey ("Jeff") Shaara, (b. 1952), and named for his father, the writer of historical fiction Michael Shaara, (1928–1988), who won the 1975 Pulitzer Prize for the 1974 novel of the American Civil War, The Killer Angels, about the Battle of Gettysburg, in Gettysburg, Pennsylvania, and later made into the Ted Turner-produced movie in 1993, Gettysburg, by director Ronald Maxwell. The original novel and movie later became the inspiration for son Jeff's prequel Gods and Generals, (1996), and sequel The Last Full Measure, (1998), set of novels of which Gods and Generals was also made into a film in 2003 by Turner and Maxwell focusing on the earlier part of the war with Confederate General Thomas J. ("Stonewall") Jackson. The younger Shaara has also since written several other novels and series of historical fiction about the American Revolutionary War, Mexican–American War, World War I and World War II. He later returned to the theme of the Civil War with a set of works focusing on the western theatre of the war, (Trans-Mississippi Theatre).

The $5,000 was first awarded in 1997, at the United States Civil War Center at Louisiana State University in Baton Rouge, Louisiana. In 2004, it was moved to the Civil War Institute at Gettysburg College in Gettysburg, Pennsylvania.

== Award winners ==
- 1997: Madison Jones, Nashville 1864
- 1998: Donald McCaig, Jacob's Ladder: A Story of Virginia During the Civil War
- 1999: Robert J. Mrazek, Stonewall's Gold
- 2000: Richard Slotkin, Abe: A Novel of the Young Lincoln
- 2001: Marly Youmans, The Wolf Pit
- 2002: Marie Jakober, Only Call Us Faithful
- 2003: no award given
- 2004: Philip Lee Williams, A Distant Flame
- 2005: no award given
- 2006: E. L. Doctorow, The March
- 2007: Howard Bahr, The Judas Field
- 2008: Donald McCaig, Canaan
- 2009: Nick Taylor, Disagreement
- 2010: Cornelia Nixon, Jarrettsville
- 2011: Robin Oliveira, My Name is Mary Sutter
- 2012: Sharon Ewell Foster, The Resurrection of Nat Turner, Part One: The Witnesses
- 2013: Peter Troy, May the Road Rise Up to Meet You
- 2014: Dennis McFarland, Nostalgia
