= Weike Wang =

Chinese-American author

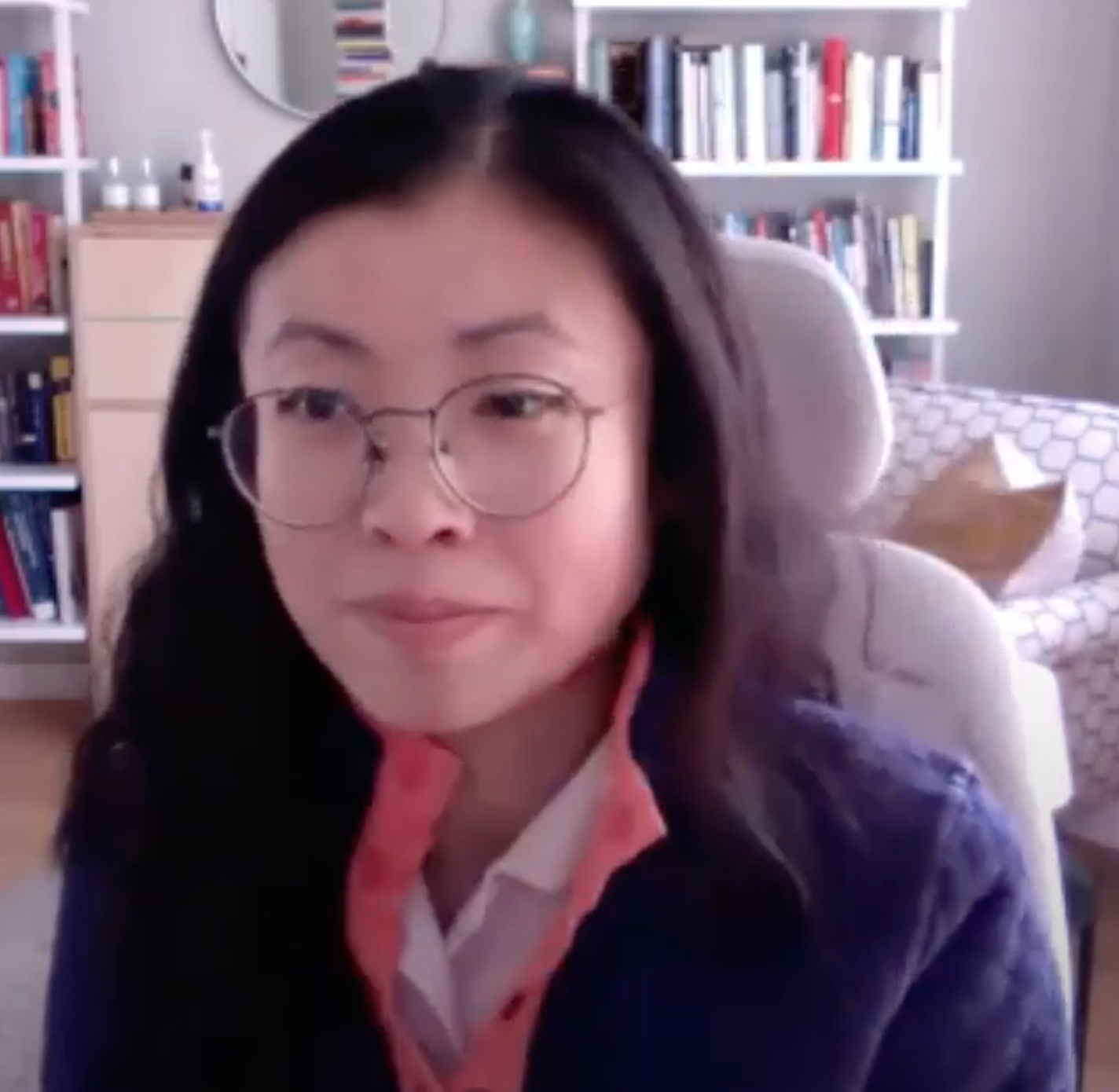
- Wang in 2021
- Born: Nanjing, China
- Education: Harvard University (BA, MSc, PhD); Boston University (MFA)
- Occupation: Writer
- Notable work: Chemistry
- Awards: PEN/Hemingway Award, Whiting Award
- Website: www.weikewangwrites.com

Weike Wang is a Chinese-American author of the novel Chemistry, which won the 2018 PEN/Hemingway Award.

Her fiction has been published in Glimmer Train, the Alaska Quarterly Review, Ploughshares, Kenyon Review, The New Yorker, and Redivider.

== Life ==
Wang was born in Nanjing, China. Her family emigrated when she was five years old. She lived in Australia and Canada before arriving in the United States with her family at age eleven. Wang once described the community in which she lived as "a very rural town, and everyone was white. I was the only Asian person in my school."

After high school, Wang attended Harvard University, where she studied chemistry for her undergraduate degree and public health for her doctorate. While she was pre-med as an undergraduate, she reconsidered going to medical school. While completing her doctorate, she also attended Boston University, where she received her MFA.

== Career ==
In 2017, Wang was selected by author Sherman Alexie for the National Book Foundation's annual 5 under 35 list. In its citation, the National Book Foundation called Wang "a brilliant new literary voice that astutely juxtaposes the elegance of science, the anxieties of finding a place in the world, and the sacrifices made for love and family." In 2018, she received a Whiting Award for Fiction, one of ten awarded each year to emerging writers.

Her 2018 short story "Omakase" was selected for inclusion in the Best American Short Stories 2019 anthology by editors Anthony Doerr and Heidi Pitlor, and in the 2019 O. Henry Prize Anthology by prize jurors Lynn Freed, Elizabeth Strout, and Lara Vapnyar.

== Writing style ==
Critics have often noted that Wang rarely names her main characters in her major works. The Chinese American protagonist of Chemistry remains nameless throughout the novel, as do her parents and everyone except for the heroine's boyfriend, Eric. Wang continued her trend of nameless characters in her short story "Omakase," which was published in The New Yorker in 2018. "I am terrible at naming characters," Wang told The New Yorker in 2018, adding that she also considers context and her characters’ lives when she decides to leave them nameless.

== Bibliography ==
=== Novels ===
- Chemistry. New York: Alfred A. Knopf. 2017. ISBN 9781524731755.
- Joan Is Okay. Random House. 2022. ISBN 9780525654834.
- Rental House. Riverhead Books. 2024. ISBN 9780593545546.

=== Short stories ===
- "Conversations with My Father". Ploughshares. 42 (2): 137–139. Summer 2016. doi:10.1353/plo.2016.0104. ISSN 0048-4474. JSTOR 44738875.
- "Omakase". The New Yorker. 94 (17): 56–63. June 18, 2018. ISSN 0028-792X.
- "Hair". Boulevard. 34 (1): 13–18. October 28, 2018. ISSN 0885-9337.
- "The Trip". The New Yorker. 95 (36): 62–67. November 18, 2019. ISSN 0028-792X.
- "The Poster". Gulf Coast. Spring 2020.
- "Flight Home". The New Yorker. 96 (8): 34–49. April 13, 2020. ISSN 0028-792X.
- "Oasis Room". Ploughshares. 47 (4): 169–183. Winter 2021–22. doi:10.1353/plo.2021.0133. ISSN 0048-4474. JSTOR 27093342.
- "Status in Flux". The New Yorker. 99 (18): 50–54. June 26, 2023. ISSN 0028-792X.
