= Madison Jones =

American novelist

- Born: March 21, 1925; Nashville, Tennessee
- Died: July 9, 2012 (aged 87); Auburn, Alabama
- Occupation: Writer
- Writing career
- Genre: Novels
- Notable awards: T. S. Eliot Award for Creative Writing
- Movement: Southern Agrarians

Madison Percy Jones (1925–2012) was a novelist born in Nashville, Tennessee. He published a dozen novels, and was considered "one of the major figures of contemporary southern letters".

== Biography ==
Madison Jones was born in Nashville, Tennessee, on March 21, 1925. He was the son of a Presbyterian businessman, and spent his early years living in suburban Nashville. When Jones was 14, his father purchased Sycamore Farm in hill country 25 miles north of the city. At 17, Jones dropped out of Vanderbilt University to become a farmer, moving to Sycamore Farm where he lived for a year and a half. He became associated with the Southern Agrarians, which proved a great influence on his later work.

After graduating from Vanderbilt in 1949 (where he studied under Donald Davidson) and getting a master's degree at the University of Florida (where he was a student of Andrew Nelson Lytle), he taught English at the University of Tennessee before accepting a creative writing position at Auburn University in 1956. He retired from Auburn in 1987, having been a longtime writer in residence.

== Literary work ==
His first novel, The Innocent (1957), was favorably reviewed by Robert Penn Warren, who praised him for his "basic seriousness of intention, and his deep, natural sense of fiction." Success came slowly; his 1967 novel An Exile (originally published in The Sewanee Review), for instance, was shopped around twice by Pat Kavanagh before André Deutsch, who had turned it down the first time, picked it up.

Allen Tate referred to him as a southern Thomas Hardy; other critics have also noted his "traditional social values and stern Puritanism." Though he is seen as a central figure in American literature, he is not well known; the first monograph on him wasn't published until 2005. He is regarded as having an "essentially religious outlook"; his later work is much darker than his earlier work, "primarily because he has seen the South losing the 'redemptive memory' which gives life meaning and substance."

He received The Sewanee Review Fellowship for 1955/56, the Rockefeller Foundation Fellowship in 1968, and the Guggenheim Fellowship in 1973. The historical novel Nashville 1864, set during the American Civil War, received the inaugural Michael Shaara Award for Excellence in Civil War Fiction in 1998. He is winner of the T. S. Eliot Award for Creative Writing.

== Bibliography ==
- The Innocent (1957)
- Forest of the Night (1960)
- A Buried Land (1963)
- An Exile (1967)
- A Cry of Absence (1971)
- Passage Through Gehenna (1978)
- Season of the Strangler (1982)
- Last Things (1989)
- To the Winds (1996)
- Nashville 1864: The Dying of the Light (1997)
- Herod's Wife (2003)
- The Adventures of Douglas Bragg (2008)
