= O. Henry Award =

Annual award for exceptional short stories

- Awarded for: Short story awards
- Country: United States
- First award: 1919; 107 years ago
- Website: http://www.randomhouse.com/anchor/ohenry/

The O. Henry Award is an annual American award given to short stories of exceptional merit. The award is named after the American short-story writer O. Henry.

The PEN/O. Henry Prize Stories is an annual collection of the year's twenty best stories published in U.S. and Canadian magazines. Along with The Best American Short Stories, the O. Henry Prize Stories is one of the two "best-known annual anthologies of short fiction."

Until 2002 there were first, second, and third prize winners and from 2003 to 2019 there were three jurors who each selected a short story of special interest or merit; the collection is called The PEN/O. Henry Prize Stories, and the original collection was called Prize Stories 1919: The O. Henry Memorial Awards.

== History and format ==
The award was first presented in 1919 and funded by the Society of Arts and Sciences.

As of 2021, the guest editor chooses twenty short stories, each an O. Henry Prize story. All stories published in an American or Canadian periodical are eligible for consideration, including stories that have been translated into English. The goal of The O. Henry Prize Stories remains to strengthen the art of the short story.

The current series editor for The O. Henry Prize Stories is Jenny Minton Quigley. Past series editors have been: Blanche Colton Williams (1919–32), Harry Hansen (1933–40), Herschel Brickell (1941–51), Paul Engle (1954–59), Mary Stegner (1960), Richard Poirier (1961–66, assisted by William Abrahams, 1964–66), William Abrahams (1967–96), Larry Dark (1997–2002) and Laura Furman (2003–2019). There were no volumes of the series in 1952 and 1953 (due to Herschel Brickell's death), 2004 and 2020.

In 2022, the series opened to African magazines.

== Partnership with PEN American Center ==
In 2009 The O. Henry Prize Stories publisher, Anchor Books, renamed the series in partnership with the PEN American Center (today PEN America), producing the first PEN/O. Henry Prize Stories collection. Proceeds from the PEN/O. Henry Prize Stories 2009 would be directed to PEN's Readers & Writers Program, which sends well-known authors to under served inner-city schools.

The selection included stories by Graham Joyce, John Burnside, Roger Nash, Manuel Muñoz, Ha Jin, Paul Theroux, Judy Troy, Nadine Gordimer, Marisa Silver, Paul Yoon, Andrew Sean Greer, and Junot Díaz, with A. S. Byatt, Tim O'Brien and Anthony Doerr – all authors of past O. Henry Prize Stories – serving as the prize jury.

In an interview for the Vintage Books and Anchor Books blog, editor Laura Furman called the collaboration with PEN a "natural partnership".

== First-prize winners (1919–2002) ==
O. Henry Award winners
Year	Author	Title	Publication	Ref.
1919	Margaret Prescott Montague	England to America	The Atlantic Monthly, September 1918	
1920	Maxwell Struthers Burt	Each in His Generation	Scribner's Magazine, July 1920	
1921	Edison Marshall	The Heart of Little Shikara	Everybody's Magazine, January 1921	
1922	Irvin S. Cobb	Snake Doctor	Cosmopolitan, November 1922	
1923	Edgar Valentine Smith	Prelude	Harper's Magazine, May 1923	
1924	Inez Haynes Irwin	The Spring Flight	McCall's, June 1924	
1925	Julian Street	Mr. Bisbee's Princess	Redbook, May 1925	
1926	Wilbur Daniel Steele	Bubbles	Harper's Magazine	
1927	Roark Bradford	Child of God	Harper's Magazine, April 1927	
1928	Walter Duranty	The Parrot	Redbook, March 1928	
1929	Dorothy Parker	Big Blonde	Bookman Magazine, February 1929	
1930	W. R. Burnett	Dressing-Up	Harper's Magazine, November 1929	
1930	William M. John	Neither Jew nor Greek	The Century Magazine, August 1929	
1931	Wilbur Daniel Steele	Can't Cross Jordan by Myself	Pictorial Review	
1932	Stephen Vincent Benét	An End to Dreams	Pictorial Review, February 1932	
1933	Marjorie Kinnan Rawlings	Gal Young Un	Harper's Magazine, June-July 1932	
1934	Louis Paul	No More Trouble for Jedwick	Esquire	
1935	Kay Boyle	The White Horses of Vienna	Harper's Magazine	
1936	James Gould Cozzens	Total Stranger	The Saturday Evening Post, February 15, 1936	
1937	Stephen Vincent Benét	The Devil and Daniel Webster	The Saturday Evening Post	
1938	Albert Maltz	The Happiest Man on Earth	Harper's Magazine	
1939	William Faulkner	Barn Burning	Harper's Magazine	
1940	Stephen Vincent Benét	Freedom's a Hard-Bought Thing	The Saturday Evening Post	
1941	Kay Boyle	Defeat	The New Yorker	
1942	Eudora Welty	The Wide Net	Harper's Magazine	
1943	Eudora Welty	Livvie is Back	The Atlantic Monthly	
1944	Irwin Shaw	Walking Wounded	The New Yorker	
1945	Walter Van Tilburg Clark	The Wind and the Snow of Winter	The Yale Review	
1946	John Mayo Goss	Bird Song	The Atlantic Monthly	
1947	John Bell Clayton	The White Circle	Harper's Magazine	
1948	Truman Capote	Shut a Final Door	The Atlantic Monthly	
1949	William Faulkner	A Courtship	The Sewanee Review	
1950	Wallace Stegner	The Blue-Winged Teal	Harper's Magazine	
1951	Harris Downey	The Hunters	Epoch	
1952	No edition			
1953	No edition			
1954	Thomas Mabry	The Indian Feather	The Sewanee Review	
1955	Jean Stafford	In the Zoo	The New Yorker	
1956	John Cheever	The Country Husband	The New Yorker	
1957	Flannery O'Connor	Greenleaf	The Kenyon Review	
1958	Martha Gellhorn	In Sickness as in Health	The Atlantic Monthly	
1959	Peter Taylor	Venus, Cupid, Folly and Time	The Kenyon Review	
1960	Lawrence Sargent Hall	The Ledge	The Hudson Review, Winter 1958–59	
1961	Tillie Olsen	Tell Me a Riddle	New World Writing	
1962	Katherine Anne Porter	Holiday	The Atlantic Monthly, December 1960	
1963	Flannery O'Connor	Everything That Rises Must Converge	New World Writing	
1964	John Cheever	The Embarkment for Cythera	The New Yorker, November 3, 1962	
1965	Flannery O'Connor	Revelation	The Sewanee Review, Spring 1964	
1966	John Updike	The Bulgarian Poetess	The New Yorker, March 13, 1965	
1967	Joyce Carol Oates	In the Region of Ice	The Atlantic Monthly, August 1966	
1968	Eudora Welty	The Demonstrators	The New Yorker, November 26, 1966	
1969	Bernard Malamud	Man in the Drawer	The Atlantic Monthly, April 1968	
1970	Robert Hemenway	The Girl Who Sang with the Beatles	The New Yorker, January 11, 1969	
1971	Florence M. Hecht	Twin Bed Bridge	The Atlantic Monthly, May 1970	
1972	John Batki	Strange-Dreaming Charlie, Cow-Eyed Charlie	The New Yorker, March 20, 1971	
1973	Joyce Carol Oates	The Dead	McCall's, July 1971	
1974	Renata Adler	Brownstone	The New Yorker, January 27, 1973	
1975	Harold Brodkey	A Story in an Almost Classical Mode	The New Yorker, September 17, 1973	
1975	Cynthia Ozick	Usurpation (Other People's Stories)	Esquire, May 1974	
1976	Harold Brodkey	His Son in His Arms, in Light, Aloft	Esquire, August 1975	
1977	Shirley Hazzard	A Long Story Short	The New Yorker, July 26, 1976	
1977	Ella Leffland	Last Courtesies	Harper's Magazine, July 1976	
1978	Woody Allen	The Kugelmass Episode	The New Yorker, May 2, 1977	
1979	Gordon Weaver	Getting Serious	The Sewanee Review, Fall 1977	
1980	Saul Bellow	A Silver Dish	The New Yorker, September 25, 1978	
1981	Cynthia Ozick	The Shawl	The New Yorker, May 26, 1980	
1982	Susan Kenney	Facing Front	Epoch, Winter 1980	
1983	Raymond Carver	A Small, Good Thing	Ploughshares	
1984	Cynthia Ozick	Rosa	The New Yorker, March 21, 1983	
1985	Stuart Dybek	Hot Ice	Antaeus	
1985	Jane Smiley	Lily	The Atlantic Monthly	
1986	Alice Walker	Kindred Spirits	Esquire, August 1985	
1987	Louise Erdrich	Fleur	Esquire, August 1986	
1987	Joyce Johnson	The Children's Wing	Harper's Magazine, July 1986	
1988	Raymond Carver	Errand	The New Yorker, June 1, 1987	
1989	Ernest J. Finney	Peacocks	The Sewanee Review, Winter 1988	
1990	Leo E. Litwak	The Eleventh Edition	TriQuarterly, Winter 1989	
1991	John Updike	A Sandstone Farmhouse	The New Yorker, June 11, 1990	
1992	Cynthia Ozick	Puttermesser Paired	The New Yorker, October 8, 1990	
1993	Thom Jones	The Pugilist at Rest	The New Yorker, December 2, 1991	
1994	Alison Baker	Better Be Ready 'Bout Half Past Eight	The Atlantic Monthly, January 1993	
1995	Cornelia Nixon	The Women Come and Go	New England Review, Spring 1994	
1996	Stephen King	The Man in the Black Suit	The New Yorker, October 31, 1994	
1997	Mary Gordon	City Life	Ploughshares	
1998	Lorrie Moore	People Like That Are the Only People Here	The New Yorker, January 27, 1997	
1999	Peter Baida	A Nurse's Story	The Gettysburg Review	
2000	John Edgar Wideman	Weight	The Callaloo Journal	
2001	Mary Swan	The Deep	The Malahat Review	
2002	Kevin Brockmeier	The Ceiling	McSweeney's	

== Juror favorites (2003–2019) ==
O. Henry Award Juror Favorites
Year	Author	Title	Publication	Ref.
2003	A. S. Byatt	The Thing in the Forest	The New Yorker, June 3, 2002	
2003	Denis Johnson	Train Dreams	The Paris Review, Summer 2002	
2004	No award			
2005	Sherman Alexie	What You Pawn I Will Redeem	The New Yorker, April 21, 2003	
2005	Ruth Prawer Jhabvala	Refuge in London	Zoetrope: All-Story, Winter 2003	
2005	Elizabeth Stuckey-French	Mudlavia	The Atlantic Monthly, September 2003	
2006	Deborah Eisenberg	Window	Tin House, Spring 2004	
2006	Edward P. Jones	Old Boys, Old Girls	The New Yorker, May 3, 2004	
2006	Alice Munro	Passion	The New Yorker, March 22, 2004	
2007	Eddie Chuculate	Galveston Bay, 1826	Manoa, Winter 2004	
2007	William Trevor	The Room	The New Yorker, May 16, 2005	
2008	Alice Munro	What Do You Want To Know For?	The American Scholar	
2008	William Trevor	Folie a Deux	The New Yorker	
2008	Alexi Zentner	Touch	Tin House	
2009	Junot Díaz	Wildwood	The New Yorker	
2009	Graham Joyce	An Ordinary Soldier of the Queen	The Paris Review	
2010	James Lasdun	Oh, Death	The Paris Review, Spring 2009	
2010	Daniyal Mueenuddin	A Spoiled Man	The New Yorker, September 15, 2008	
2010	William Trevor	The Woman of the House	The New Yorker, December 15, 2008	
2011	Lynn Freed	Sunshine	Narrative Magazine	
2011	Matthew Neill Null	Something You Can't Live Without	Oxford American	
2011	Jim Shepard	Your Fate Hurtles Down at You	Electric Literature	
2012	Yiyun Li	Kindness	A Public Space	
2012	Alice Munro	Corrie	The New Yorker	
2013	Andrea Barrett	The Particles	Tin House	
2013	Deborah Eisenberg	Your Duck Is My Duck	Fence	
2013	Kelly Link	The Summer People	Tin House	
2014	Mark Haddon	The Gun	Granta	
2014	Kristen Iskandrian	The Inheritors	Tin House	
2014	Laura van den Berg	Opa-locka	The Southern Review	
2015	Elizabeth McCracken	Birdsong from the Radio	Zoetrope: All-Story	
2015	Christopher Merkner	Cabins	Subtropics	
2015	Dina Nayeri	A Ride Out of Phrao	The Alaska Quarterly Review	
2016	Elizabeth Genovise	Irises	The Cimarron Review	
2016	Asako Serizawa	Train to Harbin	The Hudson Review	
2016	Frederic Tuten	Winter, 1965	BOMB	
2017	Michelle Huneven	Too Good to Be True	Harper's	
2017	Amit Majmudar	Secret Lives of the Detainees	The Kenyon Review	
2017	Fiona McFarlane	Buttony	The New Yorker	
2018	Jo Ann Beard	The Tomb of Wrestling	Tin House	
2018	Marjorie Celona	Counterblast	The Southern Review	
2019	Tessa Hadley	Funny Little Snake	The New Yorker	
2019	Rachel Kondo	Girl of Few Seasons	Ploughshares Solos	
2019	Weike Wang	Omakase	The New Yorker	

== Guest editor (2021–present) ==
O. Henry Award guest editors
Year	Editor	Ref.
2021	Chimamanda Ngozi Adichie	
2022	Valeria Luiselli	
2023	Lauren Groff	
2024	Amor Towles	
2025	Edward P. Jones	
2026	Tommy Orange	

== See also ==
- The Best American Short Stories
