= Richard Slotkin =

American historian

- Born: November 8, 1942 (age 83); Brooklyn, New York, U.S.
- Occupations: Cultural critic, historian, novelist

Academic background
- Education: Brooklyn College (B.A.); Brown University (Ph.D.)

Richard Sidney Slotkin (born November 8, 1942) is a cultural critic and historian. He is the Olin Professor of English and American Studies, Emeritus at Wesleyan University in Middletown, Connecticut, and, since 2010, a member of the American Academy of Arts and Sciences. He is also Fellow of the Society of American Historians. Slotkin writes novels, predominantly historical ones, alongside his historical research, and uses the process of writing the novels to clarify and refine his historical work.

== Education and career ==
Richard Sidney Slotkin was born on November 8, 1942, in Brooklyn, New York. He received a B.A. degree from Brooklyn College in 1963 and a Ph.D. in American Civilization from Brown University in 1967.

He started teaching at Wesleyan University in 1966 and helped establish the school's American studies and film studies programs. He remained at Wesleyan until his retirement in 2009.

== Awards ==
Regeneration Through Violence received the Albert J. Beveridge Award of the American Historical Association as the Best Book in American History (1973) and was a Finalist for the National Book Award in 1974. Gunfighter Nation was a National Book Award Finalist in 1993. In 1995, Slotkin received the American Studies Association's Mary C. Turpie Award for his contributions to teaching and program-building. His novel Abe: A Novel of the Young Lincoln won the 2000 Michael Shaara Award for Excellence in Civil War Fiction.

In 1976, he received an honorary Master of Arts degree in art education from Wesleyan University.

His 2024 book A Great Disorder: National Myth and the Battle for America was longlisted for the National Book Award for Nonfiction.

== Works ==
- Regeneration Through Violence: the Mythology of the American Frontier, 1600–1860 (Wesleyan University Press, 1973)
- The Crater: A Novel of the Civil War (Atheneum, 1980)
- Fatal Environment: The Myth of the Frontier in the Age of Industrialization, 1800–1890, (Atheneum, 1985)
- The Return of Henry Starr (Atheneum, 1988)
- Gunfighter Nation: Myth of the Frontier in Twentieth-Century America (Atheneum, 1992)
- Abe: A Novel of the Young Lincoln (Henry Holt and Company, 2000)
- Lost Battalions: The Great War and the Crisis of American Nationality (Henry Holt and Company, 2005)
- No Quarter: The Battle of the Crater, 1864 (Random House, 2009)
- The Long Road to Antietam: How the Civil War Became a Revolution (W. W. Norton & Company, 2012)
- Greenhorns: Stories (Leapfrog Press, 2018)
- A Great Disorder: National Myth and the Battle for America (Belknap Press, 2024)
