= Larry Dark =

American anthologist

Larry Dark has been the director of The Story Prize—a U.S. book award for short story collections—since its inception in 2004. He served as series editor of the O. Henry Awards for the 1997–2002 volumes. He has also compiled, edited, and introduced five other literary anthologies.

== Background ==
While an MFA in fiction student at Columbia University, Dark served as nonfiction editor for Columbia: A Magazine of Poetry & Prose. He hit upon the idea of asking writers to contribute something they had cut from their work or never used. The twenty pieces Dark received ran in issue 13 of the magazine in 1989 as "Cut-Outs". An editor at Ballantine Books, Betsy Lerner, approached Dark about the possibility of a book-length collection of such pieces, which became Literary Outtakes (Ballantine, 1990). The book included a foreword by Harold Bloom and work from 101 authors, including Nicholson Baker, Peter Benchley, T.C. Boyle, Annie Dillard, Allen Ginsberg, Charles Johnson, Elmore Leonard, Joyce Carol Oates, Sharon Olds, Isaac Bashevis Singer, Amy Tan, and John Updike. After that, Dark compiled, edited, and introduced three themed short story anthologies—The Literary Ghost (Atlantic Monthly Press, 1991), The Literary Lover (Viking, 1993), and The Literary Traveler (Viking, 1994)—and an additional anthology, The Story Prize: 15 Years of Great Short Fiction (Catapult, 2019).

== O. Henry Awards Series Editor ==
In 1995, Dark learned that William Abrahams, series editor for the O. Henry Awards for more than thirty years, was retiring and that the publisher, Doubleday Books, was looking for someone to take over the series. Dark interviewed and proposed adding a jury of three well-known writers to select the 1st, 2nd, and 3rd prize winning stories from among the approximately twenty stories that he would select each year. He also suggested increasing the number of magazines consulted. For the first volume he edited in 1997, Dark added a short-list of fifty other stories with brief summaries and an award for the magazine publishing the best short fiction. He also established a Web presence for the series, eventually adding a complete list of stories and authors whose work had been included in the series since its inception in 1919. Dark edited six volumes of the O. Henry Awards (1997, 1998, 1999, 2000, 2001, and 2002), collecting a total of 117 stories first published in 41 different magazines and written by 96 authors, including Kevin Brockmeier, Raymond Carver, Michael Chabon, Edwidge Danticat, Andre Dubus, Louise Erdrich, Jhumpa Lahiri, Alice Munro, Annie Proulx, George Saunders, David Foster Wallace, and John Edgar Wideman. He also produced readings to promote the books at venues such as KGB Bar, the National Arts Club, and the 92nd Street Y, featuring writers such as Sherman Alexie, Michael Cunningham, Mary Gordon, Rick Moody, Lorrie Moore, Steven Millhauser, Chaim Potok, and Mona Simpson.

== The Story Prize ==
In 2003, philanthropist Julie Lindsey approached Dark with the idea of creating an annual book award for short stories, which they launched in 2004 as The Story Prize. Each year Dark and Lindsey choose three finalists from among the collections publishers and authors submit. A panel of three judges chooses the winner. From 2005 through 2020, the three finalists appeared at The New School's Tishman Auditorium, where they read from and discussed their work with Dark before Lindsey announced the winner. In 2021, the readings and interviews were done remotely. In 2022 and 2023, the event took place at a private venue. The $20,000 top prize is among the highest in the U.S. for any annual book of fiction. In May 2012, Dark and The Story Prize also produced an event at The Center for Fiction to celebrate the stories of John Cheever to mark the centennial of the author's birth.

== Personal life ==
Dark is married to author Alice Elliott Dark, and the two have a son, born in 1991, Asher Dark.
