= Mickey Bones =

American drummer and singer-songwriter

Mickey Bones and his dog Penga

Mickey Bones is an American drummer and singer-songwriter. He has played with the Tarbox Ramblers, Bo Diddley, Morphine, The Breeders, Queen Ida, Michael Hurley, Catie Curtis, Bob Franke, Jimmy Ryan, Rick Danko, Bryan Lee, Van "Piano Man" Walls, Jill Sobule, Jim Kweskin, Birdsongs of the Mesozoic, and Steve Weber. Bones has also played in small side projects with David Lindley, Danny "Kootch" Kortchmar, and Wayne Bennett. He has led his own bands, the Boogaloo Swamis, Spitwhistle and the Hot Tamale Brass Band.

Bones has been featured with some of these musicians on record labels such as Atlantic, Shanachie, Flying Fish, Rounder, Hi-n-Dry, and Green Linnet.

Mickey Bones featured in the movie Fever Pitch and Oliver Stone's film JFK. Bones played on the soundtrack of Fever Pitch with the Hot Tamale Brass Band, and collaborated with Mark Sandman for the soundtrack of the movie Just Your Luck.
