= Laura Furman =

American author (born 1945)

- Born: Laura Furman; 1945 (age 80–81); New York City, U.S.
- Education: Bennington College
- Occupations: Novelist; writer; editor
- Spouse: Joel Warren Barna
- Children: 1

Laura Furman (born 1945) is an American author whose work has appeared in The New Yorker, Mirabella, Ploughshares, Southwest Review, Yale Review, and elsewhere.

== Biography ==
Furman was born in New York City and attended Hunter College High School and Bennington College in Bennington, Vermont. In 1978, she moved to Houston, Texas. After living in Houston, Galveston, Dallas, and Lockhart she settled in Austin with her husband, Joel Warren Barna, and their son. She now lives in Albuquerque, New Mexico.

She has written four collections of stories The Glass House, Watch Time Fly, Drinking with the Cook, The Mother Who Stayed, two novels The Shadow Line and Tuxedo Park, and a memoir Ordinary Paradise.

From 2002 - 2019, she was the series editor of The O. Henry Prize Stories, an annual collection published by Anchor Books. Furman selected the twenty winning stories.

She taught for twenty-eight years at the University of Texas at Austin, where she was Susan Taylor McDaniel Regents Professor of Creative Writing. While at UT, she founded the literary magazine American Short Fiction, which was a finalist for the National Magazine Award.

== Awards ==
- New York State Council on the Arts Fellowship
- 1982 Guggenheim Fellowship
- Dobie-Paisano Fellowship
- National Endowment for the Arts Fellowship
- Glenna Luschei Prairie Schooner Award
- Bogliasco Foundation Fellowship
- Yaddo Residencies

== Selected bibliography ==
=== Books ===
- Drinking with the Cook (story collection)
- Ordinary Paradise (memoir)
- Bookworms: Great Writers and Readers Celebrate Reading (edited with Elinore Standard)
- Tuxedo Park (novel)
- Watch Time Fly (story collection)
- The Shadow Line (novel)
- The Glass House (story collection and novella)
- The Mother Who Stayed: Stories (story collection and novella)

=== Short stories ===
- "Burning Heaven," novella, "Subtropics" (Fall 2023).
- "How I Left New York," short story, "Subtropics" (Fall/Winter 2016).
- “The Boy Who Did What He Wanted,” short story, "Epoch" (Fall 2013).
- “The Blue Birds Come Today,” short story, "The American Scholar" (Winter 2010).
- “The Eye,” short story, "Yale Review" (January 2009), 119-134.
- “A Thousand Words,” short story, "Epoch" 52, 2 (Summer 2008): 131-141.
- “Plum Creek,” "The American Scholar" 76, 2 (Spring 2007): 104-107.
- “Here It Was, November,” "Subtropics" 3 (Winter/Spring 2006-07): 106-23.
- “The Old Friend,”"Prairie Schooner" 80, 1 (Winter 2006): 131-42.
- “The Thief,” "Antioch Review" 64, 3 (Summer 2006): 538-549.
- “The Right Place for a Widow,” "Southwest Review" 88(Winter 2003): 503-513.
- “Beautiful Baby,” "Yale Review" (January 2001): 89-103.
- “Shards,” "Threepenny Review" (Fall 2000), 32-37.
- “Melville’s House,” "Southwest Review" 85(Spring 2000) 290-312.
- “The Apprentice,” "Ploughshares" 21(Fall 1995): 135-150.
- “Hagalund,” "Southwest Review" 79 (Spring/Summer 1994): 271-301.
- “The Secret Keeper,” "Southwest Review" 75 (Spring 1990): 212-233.
- “Something Called San Francisco,” "Southwest Review" 72 (Spring 1987): 168-181.
- “Tuxedo Park: Novel Excerpt,” "Cosmopolitan" 201 (October 1986): 290-291, 342-45.
- “Sunny,” "The New Yorker" 60 (28 January 1985): 29-34.
- “Buddy,” "The New Yorker" 60 (9 April 1984): 42-49.
- “Nothing Like It,”"The New Yorker" 58 (17 May 1982): 38-45.
- “Buried Treasure,” "The New Yorker" 56 (25 August 1980): 27-33.
- “The Smallest Loss,”"The New Yorker" 56 (14 April 1980): 44-52.
- “Circle Pin,” "University of Houston Forum" (Winter 1980): 19-23.
- “Sweethearts,” "The New Yorker" 55 (12 November 1979): 48-49.
- “Arlene,” "Vision" 2 (July 1979): 45-48.
- “Shazam,” "Mississippi Review" 8 (Winter/Spring 1979): 49-58.
- “For Scale,” "The New Yorker" 55 (19 March 1979): 36-37.
- “Eldorado,” "Houston City Magazine" (January 1979): 19-20 and 35.
- “Quiet With Belinda,” "Fiction" 5 (Spring 1978): 63-74.
- “Listening To Married Friends,” "Mademoiselle" 84 (February 1978): 70- 78.
- “Seesaw,” "Redbook" 148 (October 1977): 134, 250-58.
- “Real Estate,” "The New Yorker" 53 (5 September 1977): 28-32.
- “The Kindness of Strangers,” "The New Yorker" 53 (8 April 1977): 34-39.
- “Free and Clear,” "The New Yorker" 53 (7 March 1977): 28-32.
- “My Father’s Car,” "The New Yorker" 52 (8 November 1976): 44-50.
- “Last Winter,” "The New Yorker" 52 (1 March 1976): 29-36.

=== Editor ===
- Series Editor, The O.Henry Prize Stories, 2003—2019
- Co-editor, with Elinore Standard, Bookworms: Great Writers and Readers Celebrate Reading, 1997
