= Mario Alberto Zambrano =

American novelist

- Born: 1977 (age 48–49)
- Website: marioalbertozambrano.com

Mario Alberto Zambrano (born 1977) is an American novelist. His novel, Loteria, was published by Harper on July 2, 2013, and is currently in 623 libraries, according to WorldCat. It was translated into Spanish in 2014 as Lotería : la historia de unos emigrados He has received an NEA Fellowship in Literature, an Iowa Arts Fellowship, and a Princess Grace Award The Village Voice, Booklist, and School Library Journal named Loteria as a Best Book in 2013, and Diane Rehm from NPR described the novel as "beautifully illustrated." His work has been published on FiveChapters, Guernica, and The Brooklyn Rail.

Zambrano was a ballet dancer with the Hubbard Street Dance Chicago, Nederlands Dans Theater, Ballett Frankfurt, and Batsheva Dance Companies prior to his work as an author.

== Early life ==
Mario Alberto Zambrano was born in Houston, TX and attended the High School for the Performing and Visual Arts. He was awarded a 1994 Presidential Scholar Award and performed for President Bill Clinton at The White House before joining Hubbard Street Dance Chicago at seventeen years old. He was awarded a Princess Grace Award in 1995, then joined Nederlands Dans Theater in 1997. Before retiring as a professional dancer, he was a member of Ballett Frankfurt and Batsheva Dance Company. During his performing arts career, he was awarded Best Male Dancer in Ballet Tanz Magazine.

In 2009, he performed with Mikhail Baryshnikov at the Baryshnikov Arts Center in New York City.

Zambrano earned his B.A. in Liberal Arts at the New School, and his M.F.A. at the Iowa Writers' Workshop in 2013.

== Career ==
His first novel, Loteria (HarperCollins, 2013) was a finalist for the 2014 Writers' League of Texas Award, 2014 the John Gardner Fiction Award, the Texas Institute of Letters Award, and the International Latino Book Award. Loteria was chosen as a Best Book of 2013 by The Village Voice, Booklist, and School Library Journal.

He's choreographed and taught master classes in dance and creative writing at the University of Iowa, New School, Jacksonville State University, and Harvard University; has attended MacDowell Colony, Yaddo, and Hawthornden Castle in Edinburgh, Scotland.
