= DeWitt Henry =

American author and editor (born 1941)

DeWitt Henry is an American author and editor.

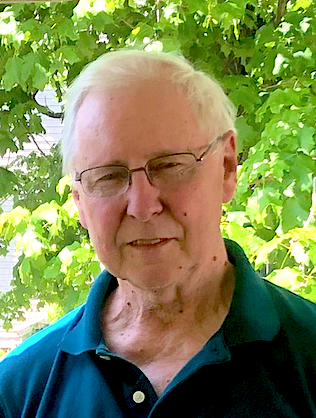
DeWitt Henry

Born in 1941 in Wayne, Pennsylvania, Henry earned his A.B. from Amherst College in 1963 and his MA and PhD from Harvard University. He is a founding editor of Ploughshares, a literary journal, and served as its editor and director from its inception in 1971 to 1995. Henry taught at Emerson College from 1983 until his retirement in 2014.

== Bibliography ==
=== Works authored ===
- Sweet Marjoram: Notes and Essays, Plume Editions/MadHat Press, 2018
- Visions of a Wayne Childhood, Create Space, 2012
- Sweet Dreams: A Family History, Hidden River Press, 2011
- Safe Suicide: Essays, Narratives, and Mediations, Red Hen Press, 2008
- The Marriage of Anna Maye Potts, University of Tennessee Press, 2001 (winner of the Peter Taylor Prize for the Novel)
- Foundlings, Poems, Artwork: Ruth Henry | ISBN 978-1953136572 | Pierian Springs Press, 2023
- Trim Reckonings, Poems | ISBN 978-1953136411 | Pierian Springs Press, 2023
- The Marriage of Anna Maye Potts,'’ 2nd Ed | ISBN 978-1953136657 | Pierian Springs Press, 2024
- Do I Dream Or Wake?, Poems | ISBN 978-1965784075 | Pierian Springs Press, 2025
- Top Cop Kills, A Novel | ISBN 978-1953136992 | Pierian Springs Press, 2025

=== Works edited ===
- Sorrow's Company: Writers on Loss and Grief, Beacon Press, 2001
- Breaking Into Print: Early Stories and Insights Into Getting Published, Beacon Press, 2000
- Fathering Daughters: Reflections by Men (with James Alan McPherson), Beacon Press 1998, pb. 1999
- Other Sides of Silence: New Fiction from Ploughshares, Faber and Faber, 1993, o.p.
- The Ploughshares Reader: New Fiction for the 80s, Pushcart Press, 1984, NAL, 1985 (winner of the Third Annual Editors Book Award)
