= Chemistry (novel) =

2017 novel by Weike Wang

- Author: Weike Wang
- Language: English
- Genre: Fiction
- Published: 2017
- Publisher: Alfred A. Knopf
- Publication place: United States
- ISBN: 9781524731755

Chemistry is a debut novel by Weike Wang, published May 23, 2017 by Knopf. The novel won the PEN/Hemingway Foundation Award in 2018.

== Reception ==
Chemistry received positive reviews from Kirkus, Entertainment Weekly, The New York Times, The Washington Post, Star Tribune, and Publishers Weekly. Library Journal and Huffington Post provided mixed reviews.

Publishers Weekly noted that Wang's "clipped, funny, painfully honest narrative voice lights up" the novel. Kirkus also applauded Wang's created voice, stating that while the unnamed narrator is "essentially unhinged, [she] is thoughtful and funny... It is her voice—distinctive and appealing—that makes this novel at once moving and amusing, never predictable." However, Huffington Post did not enjoy the narrative voice, saying, "The tight first-person can feel somewhat claustrophobic and familiar ― a cerebral depressive slowly unraveling in front of herself ― and much like the protagonist’s Ph.D. project, Chemistry doesn’t astound with its originality of concept or virtuosic language."

The Washington Post lauded Wang's use of present tense, stating that, "in conjunction with Wang's marvelous sense of timing and short, spare sections, can make the novel feel like a stand-up routine... The spacing arrives like beats for applause." The review continues, explaining that "the present tense also suggests the extent to which the past is, for this narrator, an ongoing anxiety."

Library Journal stated that while Chemistry "could have been a clever, witty novel of self-discovery," but it might have been "more effective" as "a distilled short story."

NPR, PBS NewsHour, and Minnesota Public Radio named Chemistry one of the best books of 2017. Entertainment Weekly named it one of the best debut novels, and The Washington Post named it one of fifty notable works of fiction in 2017.

Accolades for Chemistry
Year	Accolade	Result	Ref.
2018	PEN/Hemingway Foundation Award	Winner	
2018	Aspen Words Literary Prize	Longlist	
2018	National Book Foundation "5 Under 35"	Honoree	
