= Ploughshares =

American literary journal

- Spring 1988 issue
- Discipline: Literary magazine
- Language: English
- Edited by: Jenny Molberg

Publication details
- History: 1971–present
- Frequency: Quarterly

Standard abbreviations
- ISO 4: Ploughshares

Indexing
- ISSN: 0048-4474 (print); 2162-0903 (web)
- JSTOR: 00484474

Links
- Journal homepage

Ploughshares is an American literary journal established in 1971 by DeWitt Henry and Peter O'Malley in The Plough and Stars, an Irish pub in Cambridge, Massachusetts. Since 1989, Ploughshares has been based at Emerson College in Boston. Ploughshares blends the unique editorial perspectives of two guest-edited issues with two staff-edited issues each year, showcasing a variety of established and emerging writers across each issue. Guest editors have been the recipients of Nobel and Pulitzer prizes, National Book Awards, MacArthur and Guggenheim fellowships, and numerous other honors. Since August 2025, Jenny Molberg has served as Editor-in-Chief.

== History ==
In 1970 DeWitt Henry, a Harvard Ph.D. student, and Peter O'Malley, an Irish expatriate, decided to create a literary journal to fill a void they felt existed in the literary scene in Boston. Upon realizing that they and their supporters would never be able to agree on a specific editorial outlook for the magazine, the co-founders decided that the position of editor would be a rotating one. As a result, a majority of Ploughshares issues have been edited by various members of the community, giving the journal a unique and constantly changing voice.

The first issue was published in September 1971.

The magazine soon became recognized as a home for talented new writers. Some of the writers whose first or early works have appeared in Ploughshares are: Russell Banks, Ethan Canin, Raymond Carver, David Foster Wallace, John Irving, Thomas Lux, Sue Miller, Tim O'Brien, Jayne Anne Phillips, Robert Pinsky, and Mona Simpson.

In later years it has gone on to publish some of the leading voices in contemporary literature, including Stephen King, Toni Morrison, Sharon Olds, Louise Gluck, Haruki Murakami, Annie Proulx, Alice Munro, Joy Williams, Mark Strand, Jennifer Egan, and Lydia Davis and many more.

In 1988, Ploughshares became affiliated with Emerson College. In 1994, author Don Lee subsequently became Editor-in-Chief, a role he held until 2007. Nine years after becoming affiliated with Emerson, Ploughshares received the first of three large grants from the Wallace–Reader's Digest Funds. Thereafter came rapid growth, state-of-the-art computers, a new design, and aggressive marketing campaigns. The Ploughshares blog launched in 2004 and was later revamped in 2014.

In 2008, Ladette Randolph stepped into the role as Editor-in-Chief and Executive Director. During her 17 years at Ploughshares, she oversaw the full merge with Emerson, celebrated the journal's 40th anniversay with a release of digital editions of the journal and a new logo, as well as the launch of the Solos series in 2012. In February 2025, Randolph retired and longtime Poetry Editor John Skoyles was named Interim Editor-in-Chief. Later that year, Jenny Molberg was appointed Editor-in-Chief and Poetry Editor. Following her arrival, the journal welcomed Hanif Abdurrabquib as Nonfiction Editor and Paul Harding as Fiction Editor.

With a staff of full-time writers and editors, over eighty volunteer readers worldwide, an undergraduate internship program, and connections with the students and faculty of Emerson College’s Writing, Literature and Publishing Department, community lies at the heart of Ploughshares’ mission. The journal and its staff serve the local literary community through readings, events, and community outreach in Boston; in addition, Ploughshares aims to serve the broader literary community of readers and writers across the US and the global literary community, extending an effort to publish writers from around the world, especially writers of the Global South and translators.

== Journal ==
Ploughshares publishes issues on a quarterly basis. The Fall Longform and Winter issues are staff-edited and publish a mix of poetry and prose. The other two issues are guest-edited by prominent members of the literary community; Spring serves as a poetry issue while Summer serves as a prose issue.

== Solos and the Longform Issue ==
In 2012, Ploughshares launched the first series of digital-first long stories and essays. The first Solos Omnibus collected the first nine Solos in print volume and was published in 2013. In 2018, the Solos series was reimagined as the Fall Longform issue which publishes poetry and prose up to 15,000 words.^{[12]}

== The Ploughshares Blog and PS ==
In 2009, Ploughshares began publishing personal and critical essays, book reviews, and interviews on their website’s blog–updated almost daily.

The blog went on hiatus in 2023, and was relaunched in 2026 as PS: an online series that published new essays, interviews, and other work in conversation with the previous authors and content in Ploughshares’ archive.

== Books ==
Ploughshares has also published nonfiction, fiction, and poetry books.

=== 1935: A Memoir by Sam Cornish ===
1935: A Memoir is a nonfiction work written by Sam Cornish and published by Ploughshares in December 1990. Sam Cornish's 1935 is a memoir of growing up black in Baltimore during the Depression and World War II.

=== The Ploughshares Poetry Reader ===
The Ploughshares Poetry Reader celebrates the best of the poetry published in the journal's first 11 volumes, and reflects the editorial commitment to many of their writers. The book was edited by Joyce Peseroff and published in March 1987.

=== Lie Down in Darkness: A Screenplay by Richard Yates ===
Lie Down in Darkness is a screenplay by Richard Yates and edited by William Styron and published by Ploughshares in January 1983. The screenplay follows the dysfunctional Loftis family as they reflect on their lives at the funeral of Peyton, the youngest member of the family.

== Guest editors ==
Past guest editors of Ploughshares in alphabetical order.

Sherman Alexie	Cornelius Eady	Edward Hirsch	Leonard Michaels	John Skoyles	Tobias Wolff
Neil Astley	Martín Espada	Jane Hirshfield	Sue Miller	Tom Sleigh	James Wood
Russell Banks	Percival Everett	Tony Hoagland	Lorrie Moore	Tracy K. Smith	C. D. Wright
Andrea Barrett	B. H. Fairchild	Alice Hoffman	Paul Muldoon	Gary Soto	Richard Yates
Charles Baxter	Annie Finch	Fanny Howe	Antonya Nelson	Elizabeth Spires	Al Young
Amiee Bender	Nick Flynn	Marie Howe	Jay Neugeboren	David St. John	Kevin Young
Ann Beattie	Carolyn Forché	Major Jackson	Celeste Ng	Maura Stanton	
Madison Smartt Bell	Richard Ford	Gish Jen	Viet Thanh Nguyen	Gerald Stern	
Anne Bernays	Tess Gallagher	Ilya Kaminsky	Howard Norman	Mark Strand	
Frank Bidart	George Garrett	Justin Kaplan	Tim O'Brien	Elizabeth Strout	
Amy Bloom	Lorrie Goldensohn	George Kimball	Peter O'Malley	Jean Thompson	
Robert Boswell	Rigoberto Gonzalez	Bill Knott	Steward O'Nan	Christopher Tilghman	
Jamel Brinkley	Mary Gordon	Yusef Komunyakaa	Joyce Peseroff	Richard Tillinghast	
Henry Bromell	Jorie Graham	Maxine Kumin	Tom Perrotta	Colm Tóibín	
Rosellen Brown	Lauren Groff	Don Lee	Carl Phillips	Justin Torres	
Ron Carlson	David Gullette	Laila Lalami	Jayne Anne Phillips	Chase Twichell	
James Carroll	Marilyn Hacker	Victor LaValle	Robert Pinsky	Jean Valentine	
Raymond Carver	Jennifer Haigh	Philip Levine	James Randall	Laura Van Den Berg	
Lan Samantha Chang	Donald Hall	Margot Livesey	Ladette Randolph	Fred Viebahn	
Sam Cornish	Patricia Hampl	Thomas Lux	Alberto Ríos	Ellen Bryant Voigt	
David Daniel	Paul Hannigan	Rebecca Makkai	M. L. Rosenthal	Dan Wakefield	
Peter Ho Davies	Joy Harjo	Gail Mazur	Lloyd Schwartz	Derek Walcott	
Madeline DeFrees	Kathryn Harrison	Jill McCorkle	Alan Shapiro	Rosanna Warren	
Mark Doty	Stratis Haviaras	Campbell McGrath	Jim Shepard	James Welch	
Rita Dove	Terrance Hayes	Heather McHugh	Jane Shore	Ellen Wilbur	
Andre Dubus	Seamus Heaney	James Alan McPherson	Peggy Shumaker	Alan Williamson	
Stuart Dybek	DeWitt Henry	Clair Messud	Charles Simic	Eleanor Wilner	

== Cohen Awards ==
For a list of past winners, see Cohen Awards. Between 1986 and 2010, Ploughshares honored the best short story and poem published in the journal via the Cohen Awards, wholly sponsored by the journal's longtime patrons Denise and Mel Cohen. Finalists were nominated by staff editors, and the winners, each of whom received a cash prize of $600, were selected by Ploughshares' advisory editors. This award is not open for the submission of manuscripts, and has been replaced since 2011 by the Alice Hoffman Prize for Fiction.

== Alice Hoffman Prize for Fiction ==
Inaugurated in 2011, the annual Alice Hoffman Prize for Fiction honors a short story published in Ploughshares in the previous year (the Spring issue of the previous calendar year through the Winter issue of the current calendar year). The Prize is sponsored by member of the Ploughshares advisory board and longtime patron Alice Hoffman. The winner is selected by Ploughshares editors and receives a cash prize of $2,500. The announcement of the award, along with a short profile of the author, is printed in each year's Spring issue.

Previous Winners

Barbara Lock (2025)	Mario Alberto Zambrano (2019)	Elise Juska (2013)
Jen Silverman (2024)	Dantiel W. Moniz (2018)	Karl Taro Greenfeld (2012)
Molly Aitken (2023)	Victor LaVelle (2017)	Angela Pneuman (2011)
Kashona Notah (2022)	Viet Dinh (2016)	
Fei Sun (2021)	Ramona Ausubel (2015)	
Kaitlyn Greenidge (2020)	Nick Arvin (2014)	

== Ashley Leigh Bourne Prize for Fiction ==
Forthcoming in 2019, the annual Ashley Leigh Bourne Prize for Fiction honors a short story published in Ploughshares in the previous year (the Summer issue of the previous calendar year through the Spring issue of the current calendar year). The prize is sponsored by longtime patron Hunter C. Bourne III. The winner is selected by Ploughshares editors and receives a cash prize of $2,500. The announcement of the award, along with a short profile of the author, is printed in each year's Summer issue. This award is not open for the submission of manuscripts.

Previous Winners

Juliana Lamy (2026)	E.K. Ota (2023)	Kiley Reid (2020)
Ramona Ausubel (2025)	Christie Hodgen (2022)	Bell Boggs (2019)
Andre Dubus III (2024)	Vincent Yu (2021)	

== John C. Zacharis First Book Award ==
Since 1991, the John C. Zacharis First Book Award has honored the best first book published by an author who has already published work in Ploughshares. The $1,500 award, which is named after Emerson College's former president, is judged by Ploughshares editors. The announcement of the award, along with a short profile of the author, is printed in each year's Winter issue.

Previous winners

Olujunke Grace Bankole (2025)	Kaveh Akbar (2018)	Christine Sneed (2011)	Mark Turpin (2004)	Carolyn Ferrell (1997)
Estanislao Lopez (2024)	Weike Wang (2017)	Julia Story (2010)	Mailie Meloy (2003)	Kevin Young (1996)
Claire Luchette (2023)	Danez Smith (2016)	Paul Yoon (2009)	Doreen Gildroy (2002)	Debra Spark (1995)
Lara Egger (2022)	Carole Burns (2015)	Susan Hutton (2008)	Aleksandar Hemon (2001)	Tony Hoagland (1994)
Jamil Jan Kochai (2021)	Roger Reeves (2014)	Ander Monson (2007)	Dana Levin (2000)	Jessica Treadway (1993)
Jill Osier (2020)	Lysley Tenorio (2013)	Thomas Sayers Ellis (2006)	Elizabeth Gilbert (1999)	Allison Joseph (1992)
Xuan Juliana Wang (2019)	Heidy Steidlmayer (2012)	Richard McCann (2005)	David Gewanter (1998)	David Wong Louie (1991)

== John Skoyles Prize for Poetry ==
Since 2007, John Skoyles served as Ploughshares’ Poetry Editor until February 2025, when he took over as Interim Editor-in-chief before retiring later that year. During his tenure at the journal, Skoyles championed the work of emerging poets, celebrating poetry that possessed, as he put it in his Editor’s Note for the Winter 2024-25 issue, “clarity and surprise.” Skoyles edited with great care and empathy, and continues his career as a poet and writer. To celebrate his legacy at the journal, Ploughshares will award this prize to one poet each year.

== Emerging Writers' Contest ==
In the spirit of the journal's founding mission, the Ploughshares Emerging Writers' Contest recognizes work by an emerging writer in each of three genres: fiction, nonfiction, and poetry. One winner in each genre per year receives $2,000, publication in the literary journal, and a conversation with a literary agent. Ploughshares consider authors “emerging” if they haven't published or self-published a book.

Over the years, Ploughshares has helped launch the careers of great writers like Edward P. Jones, Sue Miller, Mona Simpson, Tim O'Brien, and many more.

== Honors ==
Many of past contributors to Ploughshares have received significant accolades. Since the journal's founding in 1971, stories, poems, and essays from Ploughshares have appeared over 150 times in the following award series anthologies: The Best American Poetry, The Best American Short Stories, The Best American Essays, The O. Henry Prize Stories, and The Pushcart Prize: Best of the Small Presses. Ploughshares has had more selections in The Best American Short Stories than any other literary journal in the past ten years. In the past several years, it has had more stories published in The Pushcart Prize anthology than any other publication, and the journal continues to be considered one of the most prestigious in the country.

== Events ==
Since January 2025, Ploughshares has partnered with Trident Booksellers and Cafe to host their issues' launch parties. The event typically include contributor readings, raffles, and introductions from visiting guest editors and staff editors.

Ploughshares maintains an annual presence at the Boston Book Festival, Brooklyn Book Festival, Mass Poetry Festival, and the Associate of Writers & Writing Studies (AWP) Conference.

== In Popular Culture ==
- In Danzy Senna’s novel Colored Television, the character Jane has published a piece in Ploughshares.
- Weike Wang’s novel Chemistry began as the short story “Conversations with My Father” published in the Summer 2016 issue.
- Joan Silber’s novel Mercy began as the short story under the same title published in the Winter 2024-2025 issue.
- In honor of Ploughshares’ 50th anniversary, Symphony Space presented an event on November 09, 2021 hosted by Claire Messud and James Wood with performances by Joanna Gleason, Nathan Hinton, Peter Mark Kendall, and Karen Pittman. Along with virtual introductions by Aimee Bender and Jamel Brinkley. Jane Curtin served as the guest host for the radio and podcast broadcast for this event’s episode.
- One of the protagonists in Stephen King's novel Under the Dome is said to have recently guest-edited an issue of Ploughshares.

== See also ==
- Ploughshares Guest Editors
