= Pushcart Prize =

American literary prize

The Pushcart Prize is an American literary prize published by Pushcart Press that honors the best "poetry, short fiction, essays or literary whatnot" published in the small presses over the previous year. Magazine and small book press editors are invited to submit up to six works they have featured. Since 1976, anthologies of selected works have been published on an annual basis. These initiatives are supported and staffed entirely by dedicated volunteers.

== Editors ==
The founding editors were Anaïs Nin, Buckminster Fuller, Charles Newman, Daniel Halpern, Gordon Lish, Harry Smith, Hugh Fox, Ishmael Reed, Joyce Carol Oates, Len Fulton, Leonard Randolph, Leslie Fiedler, Nona Balakian, Paul Bowles, Paul Engle, Ralph Ellison, Reynolds Price, Rhoda Schwartz, Richard Morris, Ted Wilentz, Tom Montag, Bill Henderson and William Phillips.

Many guest editors have served this collection over the years. Nominations for the prize are accepted from both on-staff contributing editors and independent small-press editors and publishers.

== Winners ==
Each edition of the Pushcart Prize includes a complete index of presses and writers reprinted in the anthology since 1976. More than 2,000 writers and 600 presses have been selected.

Among the writers and poets who have received recognition in Pushcart Prize anthologies are: Kathy Acker, Steven Barthelme, Rick Bass, Charles Baxter, Bruce Boston, Anne Carson, Raymond Carver, Joshua Clover, Junot Diaz, Andre Dubus, William H. Gass, Julian Gough, Suzanne Kamata, Seán Mac Falls, William Monahan, Paul Muldoon, Tim O'Brien, Lance Olsen, Miha Mazzini, Peter Orner, Kevin Prufer, Kay Ryan, Sheema Kalbasi, Mona Simpson, Ana Menéndez, Ladette Randolph, Kaveh Akbar, Matthew Neill Null and Wells Tower.

== Recognition ==
The Pushcart Prize anthology has earned national recognition. Kirkus Reviews praised it as "must reading for anyone interested in the present and future of America's arts and letters". Pushcart Press was awarded the 1979 Carey Thomas Prize for Publisher of the Year by Publishers Weekly.

The Pushcart Prize series was honored with the Ivan Sandrof Lifetime Achievement Award from the National Book Critics Circle in 2005, and the Poets & Writers/Barnes & Noble Writers for Writers award in 2006.
