= List of Women's Prize for Fiction winners =

Winners and shortlists for UK literary prize

Women's Prize for Fiction
- Awarded for: Best full-length novel written in English by a woman of any nationality and published in UK
- Sponsored by: Family of sponsors (2018–); Baileys (2014–2017); Private benefactors (2013); Orange (1996–2012)
- Location: United Kingdom
- Presented by: Women's Prize for Fiction
- First award: 1996
- Website: www.womensprizeforfiction.co.uk

The Women's Prize for Fiction (previously called Orange Prize for Fiction (1996–2006 & 2009–12), Orange Broadband Prize for Fiction (2007–2008) and Baileys Women's Prize for Fiction (2014–2017)) is one of the United Kingdom's most prestigious literary prizes, annually awarded to a female author of any nationality for the best original full-length novel written in English, and published in the United Kingdom in the preceding year. The prize was originally due to be launched in 1994 with the support of Mitsubishi but public controversy over the merits of the award caused the sponsorship to be withdrawn. Funding from Orange, a UK mobile network operator and Internet service provider, allowed the prize to be launched in 1996 by a committee of male and female "journalists, reviewers, agents, publishers, librarians, booksellers", including current Honorary Director Kate Mosse.

In May 2012, it was announced that Orange would be ending its sponsorship of the prize. In 2012, the award was formally known as the "Women's Prize for Fiction", and was sponsored by "private benefactors" led by Cherie Blair and writers Joanna Trollope and Elizabeth Buchan. In 2013, the new sponsor became Baileys. In January 2017, the company announced that it was the last year that they would sponsor the prize. In June 2017, the prize announced it would change its name to simply "Women's Prize for Fiction" starting in 2018, and will be supported by a family of sponsors.

The prize was established to recognise the contribution of female writers, whom Mosse believed were often overlooked in other major literary awards, and in reaction to the all-male shortlist for the 1991 Booker Prize. The winner of the prize receives £30,000, along with a bronze sculpture called the Bessie created by artist Grizel Niven, the sister of actor and writer David Niven. Typically, a longlist of nominees is announced around March each year, followed by a shortlist in June; within days the winner is announced. The winner is selected by a board of "five leading women" each year. In 2005, judges named Andrea Levy's Small Island as the "Orange of Oranges", the best novel of the preceding decade. In 2015, Chimamanda Ngozi Adichie's Half of a Yellow Sun was selected as the "Best of the Best" winner of the prize in the previous decade, as chosen by the chairs of the judging panels.

The BBC has suggested that the prize forms part of the "trinity" of UK literary prizes, along with the Booker Prize and the (now defunct) Costa Book Awards; the sales of works by the nominees of these awards are significantly boosted. Levy's 2004 winning book sold almost one million copies (in comparison to less than 600,000 for the Booker Prize winner of the same year), while sales of Helen Dunmore's A Spell of Winter quadrupled after being awarded the inaugural prize. Valerie Martin's 2003 award saw her novel sales increase tenfold after the award, and British libraries, who often support the prize with various promotions, reported success in introducing people to new authors: "48% said that they had tried new writers as a result of the promotion, and 42% said that they would try other books by the new authors they had read."

However, the fact that the prize singles out female writers is not without controversy. After the prize was founded, Auberon Waugh nicknamed it the "Lemon Prize" while Germaine Greer claimed there would soon be a prize for "writers with red hair". Winner of the 1990 Booker Prize, A. S. Byatt, called it a "sexist prize", claiming "such a prize was never needed." In 1999, the chairwoman of the judges, Lola Young, said that the British fiction they were asked to appraise fell into two categories, either "insular and parochial" or "domestic in a piddling kind of way", unlike American authors who "take small, intimate stories and set them against this vast physical and cultural landscape which is very appealing." Linda Grant suffered accusations of plagiarism following her award in 2000, while the following year, a panel of male critics produced their own shortlist and heavily criticised the genuine shortlist. Though full of praise for the winner of the 2007 prize, the chair of the judging panel Muriel Gray decried the fact that the shortlist had to be whittled down from "a lot of dross", while former editor of The Times Simon Jenkins called it "sexist". In 2008, writer Tim Lott called the award "a sexist con-trick" and said, "the Orange Prize is sexist and discriminatory, and it should be shunned".

Barbara Kingsolver is the only author to have won the prize twice, doing so in 2010 for The Lacuna and in 2023 for Demon Copperhead. Margaret Atwood has been nominated three times without a win. Hilary Mantel was shortlisted three times without winning, for Beyond Black (2005) and the first two novels in her Tudor trilogy, Wolf Hall (2009) and Bring Up The Bodies (2012), which both won the Booker Prize. The third book in the trilogy, The Mirror & the Light, was shortlisted in April 2020, a year in which the award (usually given in May) was postponed to September. Since the inaugural award to Helen Dunmore, British writers have won five times, while North American authors have secured the prize ten times.

== Recipients ==
=== 1990s ===
Women's Prize for Fiction winners and shortlisted nominees, 1996–1999
Year	Author	Title	Result	Ref.
1996	Helen Dunmore	A Spell of Winter	Winner	
1996	Julia Blackburn	The Book of Colour	Shortlist	
1996	Pagan Kennedy	Spinsters	Shortlist	
1996	Amy Tan	The Hundred Secret Senses	Shortlist	
1996	Anne Tyler	Ladder of Years	Shortlist	
1996	Marianne Wiggins	Eveless Eden	Shortlist	
1997	Anne Michaels (Note: Anne Michaels was the first non-British winner)	Fugitive Pieces	Winner	
1997	Margaret Atwood	Alias Grace	Shortlist	
1997	Deirdre Madden	One by One in the Darkness	Shortlist	
1997	Jane Mendelsohn	I Was Amelia Earhart	Shortlist	
1997	Annie Proulx	Accordion Crimes	Shortlist	
1997	Manda Scott	Hen's Teeth	Shortlist	
1998	Carol Shields	Larry's Party	Winner	
1998	Kirsten Bakis	Lives of the Monster Dogs	Shortlist	
1998	Pauline Melville	The Ventriloquist's Tale	Shortlist	
1998	Ann Patchett	The Magician's Assistant	Shortlist	
1998	Deirdre Purcell	Love Like Hate Adore	Shortlist	
1998	Anita Shreve	The Weight of Water	Shortlist	
1999	Suzanne Berne	A Crime in the Neighborhood	Winner	
1999	Julia Blackburn	The Leper's Companions	Shortlist	
1999	Marilyn Bowering	Visible Worlds	Shortlist	
1999	Jane Hamilton	The Short History of a Prince	Shortlist	
1999	Barbara Kingsolver	The Poisonwood Bible	Shortlist	
1999	Toni Morrison	Paradise	Shortlist	

=== 2000s ===
Women's Prize for Fiction winners and shortlisted nominees, 2000–2009
Year	Author	Title	Result	Ref.
2000	Linda Grant	When I Lived in Modern Times	Winner	
2000	Judy Budnitz	If I Told You Once	Shortlist	
2000	Éilís Ní Dhuibhne	The Dancers Dancing	Shortlist	
2000	Zadie Smith	White Teeth	Shortlist	
2000	Elizabeth Strout	Amy and Isabelle	Shortlist	
2000	Rebecca Wells	Divine Secrets of the Ya-Ya Sisterhood	Shortlist	
2001	Kate Grenville	The Idea of Perfection	Winner	
2001	Margaret Atwood	The Blind Assassin	Shortlist	
2001	Jill Dawson	Fred & Edie	Shortlist	
2001	Rosina Lippi	Homestead	Shortlist	
2001	Jane Smiley	Horse Heaven	Shortlist	
2001	Ali Smith	Hotel World	Shortlist	
2002	Ann Patchett	Bel Canto	Winner	
2002	Anna Burns	No Bones	Shortlist	
2002	Helen Dunmore	The Siege	Shortlist	
2002	Maggie Gee	The White Family	Shortlist	
2002	Chloe Hooper	A Child's Book of True Crime	Shortlist	
2002	Sarah Waters	Fingersmith	Shortlist	
2003	Valerie Martin	Property	Winner	
2003	Anne Donovan	Buddha Da	Shortlist	
2003	Shena Mackay	Heligoland	Shortlist	
2003	Carol Shields	Unless	Shortlist	
2003	Zadie Smith	The Autograph Man	Shortlist	
2003	Donna Tartt	The Little Friend	Shortlist	
2004	Andrea Levy	Small Island (Note: Small Island was also the Whitbread Book of the Year. In 2005, the book received the "Orange of Oranges" award.)	Winner	
2004	Chimamanda Ngozi Adichie	Purple Hibiscus	Shortlist	
2004	Margaret Atwood	Oryx and Crake	Shortlist	
2004	Shirley Hazzard	The Great Fire	Shortlist	
2004	Gillian Slovo	Ice Road	Shortlist	
2004	Rose Tremain	The Colour	Shortlist	
2005	Lionel Shriver	We Need to Talk About Kevin	Winner	
2005	Joolz Denby	Billie Morgan	Shortlist	
2005	Jane Gardam	Old Filth	Shortlist	
2005	Sheri Holman	The Mammoth Cheese	Shortlist	
2005	Marina Lewycka	A Short History of Tractors in Ukrainian	Shortlist	
2005	Maile Meloy	Liars and Saints	Shortlist	
2006	Zadie Smith	On Beauty	Winner	
2006	Nicole Krauss	The History of Love	Shortlist	
2006	Hilary Mantel	Beyond Black	Shortlist	
2006	Ali Smith	The Accidental	Shortlist	
2006	Carrie Tiffany	Everyman's Rules for Scientific Living	Shortlist	
2006	Sarah Waters	The Night Watch	Shortlist	
2007	Chimamanda Ngozi Adichie	Half of a Yellow Sun (Note: In 2015, Half of a Yellow Sun received the "Baileys of Baileys" award.)	Winner	
2007	Rachel Cusk	Arlington Park	Shortlist	
2007	Kiran Desai	The Inheritance of Loss	Shortlist	
2007	Xiaolu Guo	A Concise Chinese-English Dictionary for Lovers	Shortlist	
2007	Jane Harris	The Observations	Shortlist	
2007	Anne Tyler	Digging to America	Shortlist	
2008	Rose Tremain	The Road Home	Winner	
2008	Nancy Huston	Fault Lines	Shortlist	
2008	Sadie Jones	The Outcast	Shortlist	
2008	Charlotte Mendelson	When We Were Bad	Shortlist	
2008	Heather O'Neill	Lullabies for Little Criminals	Shortlist	
2008	Patricia Wood	Lottery	Shortlist	
2009	Marilynne Robinson	Home	Winner	
2009	Ellen Feldman	Scottsboro	Shortlist	
2009	Samantha Harvey	The Wilderness	Shortlist	
2009	Samantha Hunt	The Invention of Everything Else	Shortlist	
2009	Deirdre Madden	Molly Fox's Birthday	Shortlist	
2009	Kamila Shamsie	Burnt Shadows	Shortlist	

=== 2010s ===
Women's Prize for Fiction winners and shortlisted nominees, 2010–2019
Year	Author	Title	Result	Ref.
2010	Barbara Kingsolver	The Lacuna	Winner	
2010	Rosie Alison	The Very Thought of You	Shortlist	
2010	Attica Locke	Black Water Rising	Shortlist	
2010	Hilary Mantel	Wolf Hall	Shortlist	
2010	Lorrie Moore	A Gate at the Stairs	Shortlist	
2010	Monique Roffey	The White Woman on the Green Bicycle	Shortlist	
2011	Téa Obreht	The Tiger's Wife (Note: The Tiger's Wife is Obreht's debut novel. Aged 25 (at the time of the award), she was the youngest author to win to date.)	Winner	
2011	Emma Donoghue	Room	Shortlist	
2011	Aminatta Forna	The Memory of Love	Shortlist	
2011	Emma Henderson	Grace Williams Says it Loud	Shortlist	
2011	Nicole Krauss	Great House	Shortlist	
2011	Kathleen Winter	Annabel	Shortlist	
2012	Madeline Miller	The Song of Achilles (Note: The Song of Achilles is Miller's debut novel.)	Winner	
2012	Esi Edugyan	Half-Blood Blues	Shortlist	
2012	Anne Enright	The Forgotten Waltz	Shortlist	
2012	Georgina Harding	Painter of Silence	Shortlist	
2012	Cynthia Ozick	Foreign Bodies	Shortlist	
2012	Ann Patchett	State of Wonder	Shortlist	
2013	A. M. Homes	May We Be Forgiven	Winner	
2013	Kate Atkinson	Life After Life	Shortlist	
2013	Barbara Kingsolver	Flight Behaviour	Shortlist	
2013	Hilary Mantel	Bring Up the Bodies	Shortlist	
2013	Maria Semple	Where'd You Go, Bernadette	Shortlist	
2013	Zadie Smith	NW	Shortlist	
2014	Eimear McBride	A Girl Is a Half-formed Thing	Winner	
2014	Chimamanda Ngozi Adichie	Americanah	Shortlist	
2014	Hannah Kent	Burial Rites	Shortlist	
2014	Jhumpa Lahiri	The Lowland	Shortlist	
2014	Audrey Magee	The Undertaking	Shortlist	
2014	Donna Tartt	The Goldfinch	Shortlist	
2015	Ali Smith	How to Be Both	Winner	
2015	Rachel Cusk	Outline	Shortlist	
2015	Laline Paull	The Bees	Shortlist	
2015	Kamila Shamsie	A God in Every Stone	Shortlist	
2015	Anne Tyler	A Spool of Blue Thread	Shortlist	
2015	Sarah Waters	The Paying Guests	Shortlist	
2016	Lisa McInerney	The Glorious Heresies (Note: The Glorious Heresies is McInerney's debut novel.)	Winner	
2016	Cynthia Bond	Ruby	Shortlist	
2016	Anne Enright	The Green Road	Shortlist	
2016	Elizabeth McKenzie	The Portable Veblen	Shortlist	
2016	Hannah Rothschild	The Improbability of Love	Shortlist	
2016	Hanya Yanagihara	A Little Life	Shortlist	
2017	Naomi Alderman	The Power	Winner	
2017	Ayọ̀bámi Adébáyọ̀	Stay With Me	Shortlist	
2017	Linda Grant	The Dark Circle	Shortlist	
2017	C. E. Morgan	The Sport of Kings	Shortlist	
2017	Gwendoline Riley	First Love	Shortlist	
2017	Madeleine Thien	Do Not Say We Have Nothing	Shortlist	
2018	Kamila Shamsie	Home Fire	Winner	
2018	Elif Batuman	The Idiot	Shortlist	
2018	Imogen Hermes Gowar	The Mermaid and Mrs. Hancock	Shortlist	
2018	Jessie Greengrass	Sight	Shortlist	
2018	Meena Kandasamy	When I Hit You: Or, A Portrait of the Writer as a Young Wife	Shortlist	
2018	Jesmyn Ward	Sing, Unburied, Sing	Shortlist	
2019	Tayari Jones	An American Marriage	Winner	
2019	Pat Barker	The Silence of the Girls	Shortlist	
2019	Oyinkan Braithwaite	My Sister, the Serial Killer	Shortlist	
2019	Anna Burns	Milkman	Shortlist	
2019	Diana Evans	Ordinary People	Shortlist	
2019	Madeline Miller	Circe	Shortlist	

=== 2020s ===
Women's Prize for Fiction winners and shortlisted nominees, 2020–2029
Year	Author	Title	Result	Ref.
2020	Maggie O'Farrell	Hamnet	Winner	
2020	Angie Cruz	Dominicana	Shortlist	
2020	Bernardine Evaristo	Girl, Woman, Other	Shortlist	
2020	Natalie Haynes	A Thousand Ships	Shortlist	
2020	Hilary Mantel	The Mirror & the Light	Shortlist	
2020	Jenny Offill	Weather	Shortlist	
2021	Susanna Clarke	Piranesi	Winner	
2021	Brit Bennett	The Vanishing Half	Shortlist	
2021	Claire Fuller	Unsettled Ground	Shortlist	
2021	Yaa Gyasi	Transcendent Kingdom	Shortlist	
2021	Cherie Jones	How the One-Armed Sister Sweeps Her House	Shortlist	
2021	Patricia Lockwood	No One Is Talking About This	Shortlist	
2022	Ruth Ozeki	The Book of Form and Emptiness	Winner	
2022	Lisa Allen-Agostini	The Bread the Devil Knead	Shortlist	
2022	Louise Erdrich	The Sentence	Shortlist	
2022	Meg Mason	Sorrow and Bliss	Shortlist	
2022	Elif Shafak	The Island of Missing Trees	Shortlist	
2022	Maggie Shipstead	Great Circle	Shortlist	
2023	Barbara Kingsolver	Demon Copperhead	Winner	
2023	Jacqueline Crooks	Fire Rush	Shortlist	
2023	Louise Kennedy	Trespasses	Shortlist	
2023	Priscilla Morris	Black Butterflies	Shortlist	
2023	Maggie O'Farrell	The Marriage Portrait	Shortlist	
2023	Laline Paull	Pod	Shortlist	
2024	V. V. Ganeshananthan	Brotherless Night	Winner	
2024	Anne Enright	The Wren, The Wren	Shortlist	
2024	Kate Grenville	Restless Dolly Maunder	Shortlist	
2024	Isabella Hammad	Enter Ghost	Shortlist	
2024	Claire Kilroy	Soldier Sailor	Shortlist	
2024	Aube Rey Lescure	River East, River West (Note: River East, River West is Aube Rey Lescure's debut novel.)	Shortlist	
2025	Yael van der Wouden	The Safekeep	Winner	
2025	Aria Aber	Good Girl	Shortlist	
2025	Miranda July	All Fours	Shortlist	
2025	Sanam Mahloudji	The Persians	Shortlist	
2025	Elizabeth Strout	Tell Me Everything	Shortlist	
2025	Nussaibah Younis	Fundamentally	Shortlist	
2026	Virginia Evans	The Correspondent	Winner	
2026	Susan Choi	Flashlight	Shortlist	
2026	Addie E Citchens	Dominion	Shortlist	
2026	Marcia Hutchinson	The Mercy Step	Shortlist	
2026	Rozie Kelly	Kingfisher	Shortlist	
2026	Lily King	Heart the Lover	Shortlist	

== See also ==
- Women's Prize for Non-Fiction
- Orange Award for New Writers
- List of British literary awards
- List of years in literature
