= Unsheltered (disambiguation) =

Unsheltered may refer to:

- The state of homelessness, especially homeless people not using homeless shelters
- Unsheltered, 2018 American novel by Barbara Kingsolver
