= Small Wonder (essay collection) =

- Author: Barbara Kingsolver
- Language: English
- Genre: Essays
- Publisher: HarperCollins
- Publication date: 2002
- Publication place: United States
- Preceded by: High Tide in Tucson

Small Wonder is a collection of 23 essays on environmentalism and social justice by American novelist and biologist Barbara Kingsolver, published in 2002 by HarperCollins. It reached number 3 in the New York Times non-fiction paperback best seller list in May 2003. The cover shows two scarlet macaws, the subject of one of the essays, in flight against a tropical forest.

== Context ==
Kingsolver wrote the book in response to the 9/11 attacks, with the theme of 'reclaiming' patriotism for Americans who did not agree with the current direction of the country. The essay "And Our Flag Was Still There" was first published in the Los Angeles Times and her views such as "In my lifetime I have seen the flag waved over the sound of sabre-rattling too many times for my comfort" received an angry response from many US commentators. Some of the essays were co-written with Kingsolver's husband Steven Hopp, an ornithologist.

== Reception ==
Rosemary Canfield-Reisman noted that the book was not as well-received as her other work and that it was "labeled unpatriotic by some reviewers and naive by others."

The San Francisco Chronicle said that "Kingsolver is admirably humane and intellectually consistent. Her economy of language is a genuine asset in the often overwrought genre of expository writing. But the book, which tackles such weighty issues as the Kyoto environmental agreements and social injustice, is too self-referential to be effectively persuasive." Natasha Walter in The Guardian wrote that "although I was rooting for these essays from the first page, over and over again, just as Kingsolver was heating up the rhetoric, I would find myself turning cold". Lisa Schwarzbaum of Entertainment Weekly argued that "A reader in the wrong mood might impatiently brush away some of the flakier granola crumbs that come with the territory [but it] glows with Kingsolver's honest literary language of enchantment, and with an eye for details of the living planet that Gerard Manley Hopkins might admire." The New York Times' Laura Ciolkowski concluded that "Small Wonder has a lot to say, but its heavy-handed wisdom is unfulfilling."
