= Stop That Girl =

2005 novel by Elizabeth McKenzie

- Author: Elizabeth McKenzie
- Language: English
- Genre: Fiction
- Published: 2005 (Random House)
- Publication place: USA
- Media type: Print (Paperback)
- Pages: 207
- ISBN: 9781400062249
- OCLC: 55596349

Stop That Girl: A Novel in Short Stories is a 2005 work of fiction by American author Elizabeth McKenzie, published by Random House. Structured as nine interconnected short stories, the book follows the life of its narrator, Ann Ransom, from her early childhood to adulthood. Through Ann’s evolving perspective, the stories trace her experiences with family, love, and personal independence, forming a humorous yet deeply emotional coming-of-age narrative. The collection is recognised for its sharp prose, understated humour, and insight into the complexities of modern womanhood.

== Background ==
Stop That Girl was McKenzie’s first full-length work of fiction. Before this publication, she had written short stories for magazines including The New Yorker and The Atlantic, which influenced the episodic style of this collection. Each story captures a distinct stage in Ann Ransom’s development while collectively forming a cohesive narrative. McKenzie’s writing is noted for blending humor, emotional depth, and insight into everyday life.

== Plot summary ==
The novel begins with Ann as a perceptive eight-year-old, navigating family dynamics and observing the contradictions of the adults around her. As she grows, she faces her parents’ divorce, the eccentricities of her grandmother, and early experiences with love and disappointment. In adulthood, Ann encounters challenges in her marriage and works toward self-discovery. Across the stories, she evolves from innocence to reflection, balancing humour with vulnerability.

== Themes and style ==
The stories explore themes of identity, independence, generational tension, and resilience. McKenzie’s style combines clean, direct language with wit and subtle irony. Critics highlight her ability to reveal complex emotions through precise, understated prose. The collection examines the contradictions of personal freedom versus familial and societal expectations.

== Publication ==
Published in 2005 by Random House, the novel appeared first in hardcover and later in paperback. The book runs 207 pages and was distributed internationally. Its minimalist cover reflects the introspective and transitional nature of the stories.

== Reception ==
The New York Times in its review of Stop That Girl described McKenzie as "an accomplished humorist and a developed stylist, and she wastes no time dazzling the reader with her clean direct language, her simple but searing use of metaphor and her unflinching eye." and although finding the writing of the last two stories "cumbersome, overwrought and overdetermined" concluded that "McKenzie still feels like an original."

Stop That Girl has also been reviewed by January Magazine, Kirkus Reviews, Publishers Weekly. Booklist, Library Journal, and the School Library Journal.

== Legacy ==
The novel laid the groundwork for McKenzie’s later works, including The Portable Veblen (2016), which received critical acclaim and award nominations. Stop That Girl is often cited as an example of a short story cycle that successfully combines humor, emotional insight, and coming-of-age themes.
