= Wild Boy (novel) =

2003 novel by Jill Dawson

- First edition
- Author: Jill Dawson
- Cover artist: Matt Harris (photographs)
- Language: English
- Publisher: Sceptre
- Publication date: 2003
- Publication place: United Kingdom
- Media type: Print
- Pages: 291
- ISBN: 0-340-82296-1

Wild Boy is a 2003 novel by English author Jill Dawson and published by Sceptre. Set in Paris at the beginning of the nineteenth century, it is a fictional retelling of the story of Victor, the Wild Boy of Aveyron.

== Plot introduction ==
The novel is split into sections headed by dates in the French Republican Calendar which was in use at the time, and is in the main told by two narrative voices, Jean Marc Gaspard Itard, the doctor appointed to be the boy's tutor, and Madame Guerin to whom Itard entrusts his care. The story begins with Victor's arrival at the Deaf-Mute institute in Paris and Dr. Itard's enthusiasm that here was an opportunity to prove his theory that whatever a person's background, they could be brought into civilised society. Unfortunately, the task proves far more difficult than he anticipated...

== Inspiration ==
Inspiration for the novel came from Uta Frith's 1989 book Explaining the Enigma in which the Wild Boy of Aveynon is claimed to be the first documented autistic child. Further insights came from Dawson's personal experience with her own son who was diagnosed with Asperger's Syndrome.

== Reception ==
- Michael Newton in The Guardian is full of praise: "Jill Dawson's excellent new novel, Wild Boy, dramatises the process of that education. Its story may be familiar to some readers through François Truffaut's marvellous film, L'Enfant sauvage, but Dawson takes what is already a compelling tale and successfully fleshes it out into a convincing and highly moving book." he continues later "In the process of working out her story, Dawson deftly takes on some fascinating themes: the relationship between men and the maternal; guilt and responsibility; the possibility of our being granted a second chance in life. She revivifies a piece of history with emotional intelligence, fleshing out the few documented facts with an admirably perceptive grasp of human nature."
- Laura Baggalay writing in The Observer is also very positive, "Dawson deftly links the insularity of autism to the bloody panorama of the French Revolution still fresh in their memories: 'We had many times in our recent history seen men behave exactly as if they had no ability to imagine the needs or sensibility of another human being.'" and concludes "Wild Boy is an accomplished novel, rich with ideas and vivid characters, which is, above all, a lucid and moving exploration of the nature of autism.'
- Charlotte Moore in The Telegraph praises Dawson's depiction of autism, "Dawson is alive to the subtleties of Victor's predicament. She uses his "otherness" to expose closely guarded secrets. Itard is agitated by similarities between Victor's instincts and his own. The reader can spot a putative case of Asperger's syndrome in Itard's inability to form emotional attachments and in his pedantic pursuit of detail at the expense of the bigger picture. Madame Guerin's guilt and grief for her own son's death surface through intimate contact with Victor. Man, suggests Dawson, refuting Itard, cannot be made into something he wasn't meant to be. You can remove the wild boy from the forest, but inside he'll always be in there, always running."
