= Prodigal Summer =

Novel by Barbara Kingsolver

- First edition
- Author: Barbara Kingsolver
- Language: English
- Genre: Domestic fiction
- Publisher: Perennial HarperCollins
- Publication date: 2000
- Publication place: United States
- Media type: Print (hardback & paperback) and audio-CD
- Pages: 444
- ISBN: 0-06-095903-7
- OCLC: 48165563

Prodigal Summer (2000) is the fifth novel by American author Barbara Kingsolver. Heavily emphasizing ecological themes and her trademark interweaving plots, this novel tells three stories of love, loss and connections in rural Virginia.

== Plot summary ==
Prodigal Summer tells the story of a small town in Appalachia during a single, humid summer, when three interweaving stories of love, loss and family unfold against the backdrop of the lush wildness of Virginia mountains. The narrative follows Deanna, a solitary woman working as a park ranger; Lusa, a recently widowed entomologist at odds with her late farmer husband's tight-knit family; and Garnett, an old man who dreams of restoring the lineage of the extinct American Chestnut tree.

Kingsolver's extensive education in biology is on display in this book, laden with ecological concepts and biological facts. Her writing also exhibits her knowledge of rural Virginia, where she has lived for decades. In the acknowledgments Kingsolver thanks her Virginia friends and neighbors, as well as Fred Herbard of the American Chestnut Foundation.
