= River East, River West =

2024 novel by Aube Rey Lescure

River East, River West is Aube Rey Lescure's debut novel, published in 2024. The book tells the story of a blended family through two alternating points of view and timelines: that of Alva, a biracial teenage girl living in Shanghai in the 2000s, and Lu Fang, her Chinese stepfather whose portion of the story begins in Qingdao in the 1980s. Rey Lescure uses these dual perspectives to explore themes around identity, migration and foreignness, ambition, privilege, and the rapidly changing dynamics of life in China from the Cultural Revolution onward. River East, River West made the shortlist for the 2024 Women's Prize for Fiction, the only debut to do so that year.
