= The Bean Trees =

Novel by Barbara Kingsolver

- First edition
- Author: Barbara Kingsolver
- Language: English
- Genre: Dramatic Fiction
- Publisher: Harper & Row
- Publication date: 1988
- Publication place: United States
- Media type: Print (hardback & paperback) and audio-CD
- Pages: 232
- ISBN: 0-06-015863-8
- OCLC: 16900347
- Dewey Decimal: 813/.54 19
- LC Class: PS3561.I496 B44 1988
- Followed by: Pigs in Heaven

The Bean Trees is the first novel by American writer Barbara Kingsolver. It was published in 1988 and reissued in 1998. The novel is followed by the sequel Pigs in Heaven.

== Plot ==
Marietta "Taylor" Greer sets out to leave her home in Kentucky and travel west on a journey of self discovery. Taylor is "unconsciously retracing the Trail of Tears that led the Cherokee tribe (of which her grandmother was one) to Oklahoma." In a chance encounter, a stranger leaves a baby girl with her in Oklahoma near Cherokee territory. Taylor decides to keep caring for the child and continue traveling. Her car eventually breaks down in Tucson, Arizona.

Taylor begins a new life in Tucson while befriending Lou Ann, a woman with a young son abandoned by her husband, and Mattie, the kind owner of Jesus is Lord Used Tires. Mattie assists refugees from the southern border and Taylor befriends Estevan and Esperanza, a Guatemalan couple seeking asylum.

Taylor decides to adopt the child she was given, naming her Turtle for her tenacious nature. She encounters problems with formally granting custody due to the lack of documentation and consent from Turtle's parents. During a trip to Oklahoma for Estevan and Esperanza, the refugee couple pose as Turtle's parents (their own child died), and help Taylor forge the documentation, ensuring Turtle's future with Taylor. This is highly illegal (but likely satisfying for readers, who will generally empathize with Taylor in her desire to resolve Turtle's predicament). Taylor returns to Tucson, embracing her new home and role as mother to Turtle.

== Setting ==
The story takes place in real places in North America, including Kentucky, Oklahoma, and Arizona. It begins when the main character, Taylor, leaves her home in Pittman, Kentucky to find herself. First, her car breaks down in the middle of Oklahoma, later in Tucson, Arizona. She travels back to Oklahoma and again to Arizona because of the people she became close with throughout the novel.

Barbara Kingsolver's interest in nature is reflected in The Bean Trees, as it is full of descriptive landscapes and characters' passion towards the environment. The author uses history and biology to describe certain events or world issues related to nature.

== Characters ==
Taylor Greer, a native of Kentucky, is the protagonist and narrator of the novel. She is also known by her given name Marietta and nickname Missy. Taylor's personality is described as tough, adventurous, and independent throughout the novel.

Turtle is the three-year-old child who is left with Taylor in Oklahoma.

Lou Ann lives in Tucson and has a baby named Dwayne Ray. She is also originally from Kentucky and is Taylor's roommate.

Esperanza and Estevan are Guatemalan refugees that Taylor meets in Arizona.

Mattie is the owner of "Jesus is Lord Used Tires." She grows vegetables and beans in her garden, which is filled with tire parts. Her home is a place where undocumented immigrants stay.

== Major themes ==
The Bean Trees is a coming-of-age novel.

Barbara Kingsolver uses a nonstandard perspective to share the characters' adventures and the world they live in. The use of nonwhite mythology, anti-western sentiment, and not using the typical form of male adventure, allowed the author to explore the world where women were powerful and had a voice.

The novel shares negative traumatic experiences of the characters and people they meet, like Native Americans and Guatemalan refugees. While those scenes demonstrate qualities like sympathy and concern, they contribute to the overall spirit of the story being positive and uplifting, addressing the question: "How can growth occur in the midst of abandonment?"

The protagonist is raised by a single mother, which helps to develop themes of motherhood and nontraditional family values throughout the story, as Taylor herself becomes Turtle's single parent. The novel further explores nontraditional extended family through the relationships between the members of the community. It conveys the idea of interdependence and interaction, community's importance to each individual's life, and balance between independence and a sense of belonging. It also addresses the issue of parenthood through adoption. The novel makes reference to the issue of Native American parental rights as well.

The Bean Trees also portrays the effects of child abuse.

Themes of love and nurturing emerge from the violence and poverty that the characters face. The book conveys multiple symbolic meanings about shared motherhood, life and death, and beauty.

The underlying themes, not always recognized, include those about mockery toward the judicial system, flawed coping strategies in relation to current-day issues, and the strength of friendship.

It portrays undocumented immigration from Latin America, and the hardships experienced by refugees to the USA, as some characters facilitate immigrants' escape from political persecution. Effectively, The Bean Trees' subplot (the life of Estevan and Esperanza) serves as a critique of US foreign policy, and of the intervention of the US in the longstanding Guatemalan civil war.

== Style ==
Jack Butler wrote for the New York Times, "The Bean Trees is as richly connected as a fine poem, but reads like realism."

Kingsolver employs irony in order to emphasize the changes to Taylor's lifestyle by the end of the novel.

Symbolism is used at the beginning of the story when the main character, Taylor, changes her name while starting the journey of self-discovery. The author evokes Westward expansion through Taylor's symbolic move to the west. Kingsolver's creation of the non-male dominant world, and focus on feminism and environmentalism, communicates the case of eco-feminism.

== Reception ==
The Bean Trees was received well by critics at release, such as The Los Angeles Times stating it was the "work of a visionary". It was featured on the New York Times 1988 Notable Books of the Year list.

The novel has become a commonly assigned reading in high school literature classes since its publication.

== Criticisms ==
Despite numerous positive and uplifting attributes, this book poses a complex question - through Kingsolver's use of Taylor as a protagonist with Native American heritage (Kingsolver herself has a Cherokee ancestor), and through Taylor's illegal adoption of Turtle - as to whether "white" or ostensibly "white"/non-identifying Native Americans are better placed to raise Native American children. This concerns issues of removal of children from Native American families, communities and territories, and a possible biased assumption to the effect that Native American people may be viewed as potentially more abusive within families than "white" Americans. Arguably, while the cause of South American refugees to the USA is well championed in this novel (Kingsolver's first), the cause of Native American people and their self-determination is not clearly outlined.

The Bean Trees was removed from one school's required reading list in 2005 due to a complaint from a Church of Christ parent, saying that it contained "offensive language and adult situations", after which, a minister called it "pornography".
