= Pigs in Heaven =

1993 novel by Barbara Kingsolver

- First edition
- Author: Barbara Kingsolver
- Language: English
- Publisher: HarperCollins
- Publication date: 1993
- Publication place: United States
- Media type: Print (hardback & paperback) and audio-CD
- Pages: 343 pp
- ISBN: 0-06-016801-3
- OCLC: 27431722
- Dewey Decimal: 813/.54 20
- LC Class: PS3561.I496 P54 1993
- Preceded by: The Bean Trees

Pigs in Heaven (ISBN 9780060168018) is a 1993 novel by Barbara Kingsolver; it is the sequel to her first novel, The Bean Trees. It continues the story of Taylor Greer and Turtle, her adopted Cherokee daughter. It highlights the strong relationships between mothers and daughters, with special attention given to the customs, history, and present living situation of the Cherokee Nation in Oklahoma. It is Kingsolver's first book to appear on the New York Times Best Seller list.

In The New York Times Book Review, Karen Karbo praised Kingsolver's "extravagantly gifted narrative voice" and called the novel a "resounding achievement" In the Los Angeles Times, Antonya Nelson wrote that Kingsolver is a "gifted stylist," but that she struggles to create a believable setting for the novel.

Karbo quoted Barbara Kingsolver's interview statement about why she wrote this sequel book: "I conceived of the idea for Pigs in Heaven as I watched Native American children being adopted by outsiders. ...I had the option and the obligation to deal with the issue because the moral question was completely ignored in the first book[, The Bean Trees]."
