= Animal Dreams =

Novel by Barbara Kingsolver

- First edition
- Author: Barbara Kingsolver
- Cover artist: Lisa Desimini
- Language: English
- Publisher: HarperCollins
- Publication date: September 1990
- Publication place: United States
- Media type: Print (Paperback)
- Pages: 352 pp
- ISBN: 0-06-016350-X
- OCLC: 21232129
- Dewey Decimal: 813/.54 20
- LC Class: PS3561.I496 A86 1990

Animal Dreams is a 1990 novel by Barbara Kingsolver. A woman named Cosima "Codi" Noline returns to her hometown of Grace, Arizona to help her aging father, who is slowly losing his struggle with Alzheimer's disease. She takes a biology teacher position at the local high school and lives with her old high school friend, Emelina. Animal Dreams features Kingsolver's trademark—alternating perspectives throughout the novel. Most chapters are told from the perspective of Codi, while others are told from her father, Homer's, perspective. The book was dedicated to Ben Linder, who was killed by the Contras on April 28, 1987.

The novel features some Hispanic and Native American themes. Codi's sister, Halimeda "Hallie", moves to Nicaragua to teach local people more sustainable farming techniques. Another political theme in the novel is the small town's fight against the Black Mountain Mining Company, which pollutes the river water and nearly destroys the citizens' orchard trees, Grace's primary economic livelihood.

In addition to political themes like these, many of Kingsolver's novels also feature images and themes from biology. Animal Dreams is rich with natural imagery and the study of the created world. And, as with most Kingsolver novels, this one is laced with genial humor.

== Reception ==
Writing in the New York Times, Jane Smiley has some reservations about the novel: "Ms. Kingsolver has chosen to explore Codi's despair, and in doing so she frequently undermines the suspense and the weight of her book. First-person narration can be tricky, and Ms. Kingsolver falls into its trap: Codi comes across too often as a whiner, observant of others but invariably more concerned with her own state of mind." Smiley concludes that Kingsolver "demonstrates a special gift for the vivid evocation of landscape and of her characters' state of mind. That she leaves open spaces, that she doesn't quite integrate everything into a perfect system, is probably to her credit."

Kirkus Reviews says "Kingsolver has political conviction, a wonderful eye for the surface of things and many charming poetic conceits, but here her characters seem constructed rather than real. A promising miss."

Margaret Randall of the Los Angeles Times is positive: "As I read the last few pages of Animal Dreams, I felt a brief moment of panic. Would this book really end as it seemed it was going to? Suddenly the outcome I had hoped for unwound before my grateful eyes. Things happened as I wanted them to, as I breathed a sigh of relief. This neat wrap-up may be the single flaw in an otherwise exceptionally crafted narrative. Most important for me, however, is my conviction that Kingsolver is giving a new voice to our literature, one that fulfills its promise even as it begins its journey: four books in as many years."

== Awards ==
- Pen/USA West Fiction Award
- Edward Abbey Award for Ecofiction
- Named an American Library Association Notable Book, the Arizona Library Association Book of the Year, and a New York Times Notable Book.
