= Demon Copperhead =

2022 novel by Barbara Kingsolver

- Author: Barbara Kingsolver
- Language: English
- Publisher: Harper
- Publication date: October 18, 2022
- Publication place: United States
- Media type: Print (hardcover)
- Pages: 560
- Awards: Pulitzer Prize for Fiction; Women's Prize for Fiction; James Tait Black Memorial Prize
- ISBN: 978-0-06-325192-2

Demon Copperhead is a 2022 novel by Barbara Kingsolver. It was a co-recipient of the 2023 Pulitzer Prize for Fiction, and won the 2023 Women's Prize for Fiction. Kingsolver was inspired by the Charles Dickens novel David Copperfield. While Kingsolver's novel is similarly about a boy who experiences poverty, Demon Copperhead is set in Appalachia and explores contemporary issues. The book touches on themes of the social and economic stratification in Appalachia, child poverty in rural America, and drug addiction with a focus on the opioid crisis.

== Plot ==
Damon Fields is born to a single teenage mother in a trailer home in Lee County, in the Appalachian Mountains of Virginia. He is nicknamed "Demon Copperhead" for his red hair, dark skin and light eyes, inherited from his Melungeon father who drowned at a swimming hole called the Devil's Bathtub. Throughout the book, Demon is fascinated with the ocean and longs to see it one day. Demon spends much of his time with their neighbors, Mr. and Mrs. Peggot, who are raising their grandson Matt Peggot (nicknamed Maggot). Maggot and Demon are the same age and become best friends.

When Demon is in elementary school, his mother begins a relationship with a trucker named Stoner, who becomes abusive. One summer, the Peggots take Demon on a trip to Knoxville, where he meets and is captivated by Maggot’s aunt June and her adopted daughter Emmy. During Demon’s trip to Knoxville, his mother marries Stoner, whose behavior becomes even more abusive. She relapses into her former drug addiction and ODs. Stoner pays for her to be sent to rehab and Demon is put in short-term foster care.

His foster home is at Creaky Farms, run by Mr. Crickson who fosters another three young boys; Fast Forward, the quarterback for the Lee High School Generals football team, Swap-Out, who is mentally ill, and Tommy, who bonds with Demon over their shared love of drawing. The living conditions are squalid and Crickson forces the foster kids to assist with farm work, including tobacco harvesting. Highly popular Fast Forward holds influence over the other foster children, introducing them to drugs and pressuring them to give him money.

Demon's mom, now pregnant, overdoses on oxyContin for the second time and dies. Demon returns for the funeral and spends Christmas with the Peggots, joining them on another trip to Knoxville. June has decided to move back to Lee County due to her colleagues in Knoxville demeaning her for being a 'redneck'. Demon begs the Peggots to adopt him, but they apologize and tell him their old age makes it impossible. A heartbroken Demon leaves Creaky Farms and is sent to stay with another neglectful foster family, the McCobbs, where he largely goes hungry and is made to feel like a financial burden. He is able to save some money by working for Mr. Ghali, a Dalit immigrant from India, who runs a garbage disposal operation (and implied meth lab) out of a gas station. Demon, now in fifth grade, remains neglected at home and is mocked at school for his unkempt appearance and bad smell. The McCobbs are forced to move due to financial issues. Demon runs away to avoid another foster placement.

Neglected and hungry, Demon decides to hitchhike to Murder Valley, Tennessee, to find his paternal grandmother. He finds his grandmother Betsy Woodall, a hardy old woman who lives with her disabled brother Dick. Betsy contacts Coach Winfield, the coach of the Lee High Generals, who takes Demon in. Demon moves to Coach's mansion where he meets his daughter Agnes (nicknamed Angus after a misunderstanding) and a young man named U-Haul who assists Coach. Coach struggles with alcoholism, but recognizes Demon's potential as a football player. He starts training him as a tight end and he eventually becomes a star player for the Generals. Demon and Maggot drift apart as Maggot takes on a Goth lifestyle and is bullied for his perceived homosexuality.

Demon connects with his English teacher Lewis Armstrong. Mr. Armstrong, who is Black, emphasizes the working class population in Virginia who fought on the Union side in the American Civil War. His white wife, Annie, also a teacher, tries to nurture Demon's artistic abilities when he is identified as gifted. Demon takes a job at a farm supply store where he meets and falls in love with Dori, the daughter of the store's owner. Dori, whose mother is dead, shares that she dropped out of school to take care of her dying father. At a football game, Demon gets tackled and badly injures his knee. The team doctor puts him on oxyContin and Demon quickly gets addicted despite warnings from June. After a school dance, Dori gives Demon fentanyl that she stole from her father as they have sex. The two begin a relationship and start regularly abusing substances together.

June throws a Fourth of July party at her house. Demon discovers that Hammer Kelly, a Peggot cousin through marriage, has started dating Emmy. Demon introduces Emmy to Fast Forward at the party and they later form a relationship, devastating Kelly. Demon receives a warning from Fast Forward's former foster sister Rose Dartnell (who Fast Forward previously referred to as his potential girlfriend) about his violent tendencies, sharing he regularly tried to kill his foster siblings and left her permanently scarred in a murder attempt. Despite this, Rose loves him and wants to “fix him”. Demon tries to see the ocean by traveling east with Fast Forward, Emmy and Maggot. This trip is cancelled when Fast Forward reaches Richmond and, having completed a drug deal, turns around.

Dori's father dies, wrecking her emotionally. Demon drops out of school and moves in with Dori. They both become increasingly dependent on pain killers as they live in squalor. Emmy also becomes heavily involved in drugs and runs away with Fast Forward as June loses track of her. Rose tells Demon that Fast Forward uses his girlfriends as “bait” for drug dealers in Mexico, and that Emmy is most likely being held hostage and raped. She gives him Emmy’s bracelet (a childhood gift from Demon) as evidence. After months of searching, June finds Emmy and rescues her from an Atlanta drug den with the assistance of Demon and her brother. June sends Emmy to an expensive rehab facility. U-Haul confronts Angus in the Winfield house, telling her Coach Winfield has been embezzling funds. He threatens to expose Coach if Angus doesn’t sleep with him, revealing he has been sexually obsessed with her since she was a young child, watching her and taking her clothing. A terrified Angus calls Demon for help. Together, they manage to get the increasingly aggressive U-Haul out of the house.

Demon, still addicted to opioids, takes on and loses several minimum wage jobs but also reconnects with Tommy. Hanging out at the newspaper Tommy works for, Demon begins anonymously publishing a popular comic strip. Dori reveals that she is pregnant, and Demon tries to convince her to get sober for the baby. However, Demon comes home to find that Dori has miscarried, devastating them both. Dori's drug habit gets worse, culminating in a fatal overdose. Demon moves in with Maggot, both of them rattled over Emmy’s abuse and Dori’s death. Rose tells Demon and Maggot they can find Fast Forward by the waterfall at the Devil's Bathtub where Demon’s father died. On the way there, they pass Hammer Kelly, who is fixing a flat tire in the pouring rain. Heartbroken over Emmy, he has started doing drugs. He joins them as they head to seek justice, deciding to bring his rifle. Fast Forward, who is preparing for a reckless dive into the waterfall, fatally falls when he sees Hammer aiming the rifle at him. Hammer tries to save Fast Forward but drowns in the process.

June sponsors a grief stricken Demon to stay at a rehab center in Knoxville. Here, Demon resumes drawing and decides to make a graphic novel about the history of the Appalachian people. Maggot has gone to juvenile prison for supplying Hammer with drugs the night he died, and Tommy has moved to Pennsylvania to marry a girlfriend he met online. Demon stays in touch with Angus, now at college in Nashville, and develops feelings for her. Years pass and Annie contacts Demon about publishing his book. Demon knows that she is expecting a baby and drives to Lee County to meet her instead. After seeing that Lewis has taken Annie to the hospital to give birth, Demon visits Betsy, Dick and June. Skipping a retirement party for Coach, Demon fears the traumatic memories that returning to Lee County would surface. He asks Betsy about Angus’ love life, knowing she shares things with Betsy she doesn’t with him. Coyly, the old woman tells him to ask her himself, saying she only has one man in mind. Visiting Angus the next day, who is preparing to sell Coach's old house, Demon begins to understand they have always had feelings for each other. The book ends with Angus and Demon driving toward the ocean together, his hand tenderly touching the back of her neck.

== Characters ==
Many of the characters in the book are inspired by characters in Dickens's David Copperfield. In the following list, the Dickensian characters are parenthesised:

- Damon Fields – Also known as Demon Copperhead due to his "copper-wire hair and some version of attitude." (David Copperfield)
- "Mom" Fields – Demon's mother. Demon's birthfather (also named Damon) dies the summer before Demon is born. (Clara Copperfield)
- Murrell Stone – Also known as Stoner. Demon’s cruel stepfather. (Edward Murdstone)
- Nance Peggot – Neighbor of Demon and his mom. Nance and Mr. Peggot often watch out for Demon and provide some stability in his early years. (Clara Peggotty)
- Mr. Peggot – Nance Peggot's husband.
- Hammerhead Kelly – "Hammerhead Kelly, that was some form of Peggot-cousin add-on by marriage." (Ham Peggotty)
- Matt Peggot – Also known as Maggot. Grandson of Nance and Mr. Peggot, with whom he lives because his mother is in jail.
- June Peggot – Daughter of Nance and Mr. Peggot who has moved to Knoxville after receiving her nursing degree. (Daniel Peggotty)
- Emmy – Peggot niece who lives with her Aunt June in Knoxville. Demon and Emmy have a childhood affection. (Emily or Little Em'ly)
- Sterling Ford – Also known as Fast Forward. Demon's fellow orphan at the Creaky Farm and a star on the Lee High football team, the Generals. (James Steerforth)
- Tommy Waddell – Also known as Waddles. Demon's long-term friend and an orphan that he meets at Creaky Farm. Tommy doodles and draws skeletons, using his art to deal with stress; later, he works at a local newspaper where he and Demon create a newspaper comic strip. (Tommy Traddles)
- Sophie – Tommy's long-distance girlfriend (living in Pennsylvania) and later his wife. (Sophy)
- Mr Crickson – Also known as Creaky to the foster boys: Fast Forward, Waddles, Swap-Out and Demon. He runs a farm and takes in foster boys to do manual labor such as tobacco cutting, barn repair and tending cattle. He treats the boys just well enough for the Department of Social Services (DSS) to allow him to continue to conduct foster care. (Mr. Creakle)
- Mr and Mrs McCobb – Parents of the foster home where Demon stays after Creaky's. Demon sleeps in the laundry room, which used to be where the dog was kept, and is expected to help pay his way by helping Mr McCobb stuff envelopes; Mr McCobb eventually finds Demon a job at Golly's Market where he sorts trash for cans, bottles and other things of value. The McCobb family is perpetually out of money and takes Demon in only for the money from DSS. (Wilkins Micawber and Emma Micawber)
- Betsy Woodall – Paternal grandmother who shows up on the day of Demon's birth, wanting to take him with her. After escaping the foster system, Demon seeks her out. She finds a home for Demon with Coach Winfield and his daughter Angus. (Betsey Trotwood)
- Brother Dick – Betsy’s physically disabled brother. He writes Shakespeare quotes on a huge kite. Demon eventually takes him out in his wheelchair to fly it. (Mr. Dick)
- Coach Winfield – Demon lives with him while in high school where Winfield is the celebrated football coach of the Generals. (Mr Wickfield)
- Angus – Coach Winfield's daughter; she and Demon have a relationship that Demon eventually recognizes as something that can last. (Agnes Wickfield)
- Ryan Pyles – Also known as U-Haul. Football team equipment handler. Exhibits false humility. "The man oozed slime. He was always touching and petting his face and grimy red hair and other things that were just wrong." (Uriah Heep)
- Mr Armstrong – Middle school teacher and guidance counselor who has learned Demon's history and works to help him with school. (Dr Marcus Strong)
- Ms Annie – "Hippie" art teacher at Demon's high school who encourages his artistic abilities and encourages him in his comic strip creation. Wife of Mr Armstrong. (Annie)
- Vester Spencer – Owns the hardware and feed store where Demon works. He dies of complications of lung cancer, leaving Dori alone. (Francis Spenlow)
- Dori – Daughter of Vester Spencer whom Demon falls in love with. Both she and Demon are addicted to OxyContin and other prescription drugs. (Dora Spenlow)
- Jip – Dori's dog who plays a big role in her life and affections. (Jip)
- Rose Dartell – Fast Forward’s friend who despises Demon due to jealousy over his relationship with Fast Forward. (Miss Rosa Dartle)
- Mouse – Very small, fast-talking friend of Fast Forward. (Miss Mowcher)

== Reception ==
Ron Charles of The Washington Post praises Demon Copperhead as his "favorite novel of 2022" as it is "equal parts hilarious and heartbreaking, this is the story of an irrepressible boy nobody wants, but readers will love." Writing for The Guardian, Elizabeth Lowry contends that "while the task of modernising [Dickens's] novel is complicated by the fact that mores have shifted so radically since the mid-19th century … the ferocious critique of institutional poverty and its damaging effects on children is as pertinent as ever." In a starred review, Kirkus Reviews called the novel "An angry, powerful book seething with love and outrage for a community too often stereotyped or ignored."

However, Lorraine Berry of The Boston Globe criticizes the novel as poverty porn, arguing that,

In seeking to raise awareness of child hunger and poverty in the United States, Kingsolver turns her characters’ lives into tales of misery and the inevitability of failure. Her characters wallow in dark hollows with little light, condemned to forever repeat the horrific mistakes of previous generations. She makes the people of Appalachia into objects of pity, but in doing so, also intimates that falling into drug abuse, rejecting education, and 'clinging' to their ways are moral choices.

== Awards and honors ==
=== Awards ===
- 2023 Pulitzer Prize for Fiction, won
  - Note: Hernan Diaz's Trust also won the award. This is the first time two books shared the award in its history.
- 2023 Orwell Prize for Political Fiction, shortlist
- 2023 Women's Prize for Fiction, won
  - Note: The first author to win the prize twice; previously won in 2010 for The Lacuna.
- 2022 James Tait Black Prize for Fiction, won

=== Honors ===
- "10 Best Books of 2022" by The Washington Post
- "10 Best Books of 2022" by The New York Times.
- It is listed #61 on The New York Times' 100 Best Books of the 21st Century list
  - Note: The novel was ranked #1 in its Reader's Picks List
