= MacGregor Tells the World =

2007 novel by Elizabeth McKenzie

- Author: Elizabeth McKenzie
- Language: English
- Genre: Fiction
- Published: 2007 (Random House)
- Publication place: USA
- Media type: Print (Paperback)
- Pages: 259
- ISBN: 9781400062256
- OCLC: 74029444

MacGregor Tells the World: A Novel is a 2007 novel by Elizabeth McKenzie. It is about a young man, MacGregor West, who searches for the reasons behind his mother's untimely death.

== Reception ==
The San Francisco Chronicle calls MacGregor Tells the World "a story for romantics ... not a realist novel", and was critical of it as it "doesn't quite have room for all of its stories." The Chicago Tribune found it a "charmingly off-center first novel".

MacGregor Tells the World has also been reviewed by the School Library Journal.
