= George Marshall (environmentalist) =

British environmentalist

George Marshall (born 1964) is a British environmental campaigner, communications specialist and writer. He is the founder of Climate Outreach and is a specialist in climate communication. He is the author of Carbon Detox (2007) and Don't Even Think About It: Why Our Brains Are Wired to Ignore Climate Change (2014). He lives in mid-Wales.

== Life and work ==
=== Environmental campaigning ===
From 1988 to 2000, Marshall worked on campaigns for tropical forest conservation and defence of indigenous land rights with the Australian-based Rainforest Information Centre and The Ecologist magazine, specialising in the exposure of corruption and illegal logging in Papua New Guinea. Marshall subsequently worked as international campaigns director for the Rainforest Foundation and the director of the forests campaign for Greenpeace USA.

In 2004, he co-founded (with Richard Sexton) Climate Outreach, a UK charity that specialises in increasing public engagement in climate-change related issues. He is currently the Director of Projects at Climate Outreach and leads on a range of projects applying the latest research in climate communications.

=== Eco-renovation ===
In 2000, George Marshall took a year's sabbatical to renovate a terrace house for his family as a model low energy retrofit that reduced energy and water use by two thirds. His website on the project won a Millennium Award and led The Ecologist to list Marshall as one of their Ten Green Visionaries in 2009.

=== Research ===
Marshall has spoken and written extensively on the need to engage new audiences on climate change, especially conservatives and people of religious faith.

== Published works ==
Marshall is the author of Carbon Detox (Hamlyn Gaia, 2007) on personal action to reduce emissions. This subsequently became the basis of a stand-up one man show.

His second book, Don't Even Think About It: Why Our Brains Are Wired to Ignore Climate Change (Bloomsbury 2014), explores the underlying social and psychological obstacles to accepting climate change. The book has been widely praised and was described by the journalist George Monbiot in The Guardian as "the most important book published on climate change in the past few years".

== See also ==
- Flight Behavior
