= The Exhibitionist =

2022 book by Charlotte Mendelson

- Author: Charlotte Mendelson
- Language: English
- Publisher: Pan MacMillan
- Publication date: 2022
- Publication place: England
- Pages: 336
- ISBN: 9781529052787

The Exhibitionist is a 2022 novel by English author Charlotte Mendelson. The novel is published by Pan Macmillan. The book depicts the lives of a dysfunctional middle-class family living in London in the early 2010s. The family members have their lives insidiously controlled by the patriarch, who is an artist.

== Narrative ==
The novel opens with Ray Hanrahan, the self-centered, egotistical patriarch of the family, who is an artist with delusions of brilliance but who is past his prime. His most famous paintings were from the 1970s, however, after a long period of inactivity he is planning his first art show in decades. Ray is controlling of his family, often manipulating them to his will or imposing requirements of unconditional loyalty from them. Ray's wife Lucia, also an artist (a sculptor), had deprioritized her own art career to raise their three children and support her husband in his career. However, when Lucia's agent contacts her regarding an offer to showcase her works at the Venice Biennale, Lucia is vacillating regarding the opportunity. She has reservations regarding the art exhibit as she does not want to anger her husband. Ray is having an affair with his doctor and Lucia is also having an affair with a member of parliament, Priya, who is also married.

The narrative also delves into the lives of the couple's three adult children. Lucia's eldest son, from a previous relationship, is Patrick (nicknamed "Patch"). Patch, who is Ray's stepson, is maladjusted and unable to form personal relationships nor hold a steady job. Repressed due to his controlling stepfather, he lives on a caravan on the family property and helps with upkeep of the house. Leah, the middle daughter, is unquestionably devoted to her father and assists with his bidding. And Jess, the youngest daughter, is living with her boyfriend in Edinburgh. Jess is pregnant with their child, but she is unsure about her love to her boyfriend.

== Reception ==
The book was generally well received by critics and was longlisted for the 2022 Women's Prize for Fiction. The novel was also named by The Times as their novel of the year and was named as one of the best books of 2022 by The Guardian.

Writing for The Guardian, author Sarah Moss commends Mendelson for her portrayal of the antagonist Ray, stating: "But partly because we see him through the eyes of his lifelong victims and partly because Mendelson is unfailingly excellent at the level of the sentence, Ray is horribly convincing, sitting spider-like at the centre of his web of destruction". Also writing for The Guardian, in a positive review, author Jonathan Self states of Mendelson's prose: "Her new novel is so devoid of secondhand sentences that it's quite possible she spent all nine years since its predecessor polishing her jokes and turning phrases round until they shine". Writing for the New York Times, in a mixed review, regarding the plot, critic Alexandra Jacobs states: "All these points of view run a little amok like rivulets of paint, even as "The Exhibitionist" minutely and often brilliantly sketches the foibles of a certain creative class, much is left unresolved." Jacobs further states that Mendelson is "more interested in digging around the grubbiness of human relations than in tidying the plot". Critic Lucy Scholes, writing in the Financial Times, commended Mendelson for her nuanced portrayal of the other members of the family rather than relying on over-exposure of the antagonist.
