= Barbara Kingsolver =

American author, poet, and essayist (born 1955)

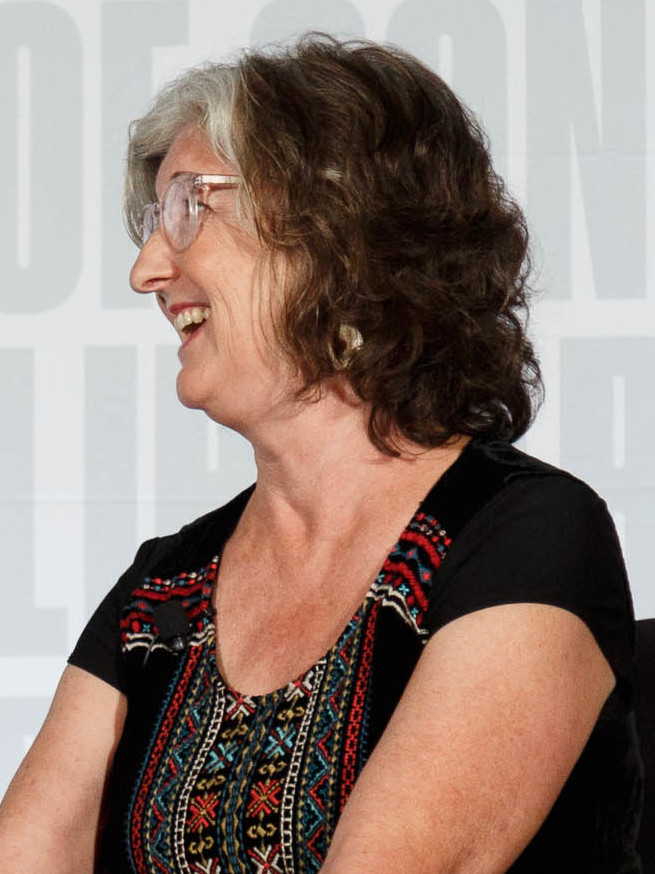
- Kingsolver at the 2019 National Book Festival
- Born: Barbara Ellen Kingsolver; April 8, 1955 (age 71); Annapolis, Maryland, U.S.
- Education: DePauw University (BA); University of Arizona (MA)
- Occupations: Novelist; poet; essayist
- Spouses: Joseph Hoffmann (1985–1992); Steven Lee Hopp (1994–present)
- Children: 2
- Writing career
- Period: 1988–present
- Genre: Historical fiction
- Subjects: Social justice, feminism, environmentalism
- Notable works: The Poisonwood Bible; Animal, Vegetable, Miracle; Flight Behavior; Demon Copperhead
- Website: www.kingsolver.com

Barbara Ellen Kingsolver (born April 8, 1955) is an American novelist, essayist, and poet. Her widely known works include The Poisonwood Bible, the tale of a missionary family in the Congo; and Animal, Vegetable, Miracle, a nonfiction account of her family's attempts to eat locally. In 2023, she was awarded the Pulitzer Prize for Fiction for the novel Demon Copperhead. Her work often focuses on topics such as social justice, biodiversity, and the interaction between humans and their communities and environments.

Kingsolver has received numerous awards, including the Dayton Literary Peace Prize's Richard C. Holbrooke Distinguished Achievement Award in 2011 and the National Humanities Medal. After winning for The Lacuna in 2010 and Demon Copperhead in 2023, Kingsolver became the first author to win the Women's Prize for Fiction twice. Since 1993, each one of her book titles has been on the New York Times Best Seller list.

Kingsolver was raised in rural Kentucky, lived briefly in the Congo in her early childhood, and as of 2024 lives in Virginia, in the Appalachia region. Kingsolver earned degrees in biology, ecology, and evolutionary biology at DePauw University and the University of Arizona, and worked as a freelance writer before she began writing novels. In 2000, the politically progressive Kingsolver established the Bellwether Prize to support "literature of social change".

== Biography ==
Kingsolver was born in 1955 in Annapolis, Maryland, the daughter of Wendell Roy Kingsolver and Virginia Lee (née Henry) Kingsolver, but grew up in Carlisle, Kentucky. When Kingsolver was seven, her father, a physician, took the family to Léopoldville, Congo (now Kinshasa, Democratic Republic of the Congo).

After graduating from high school, Kingsolver attended DePauw University in Greencastle, Indiana, on a music scholarship, studying classical piano. She changed her major to biology after realizing that "classical pianists compete for six job openings a year, and the rest of [them] get to play 'Blue Moon' in a hotel lobby".

Kingsolver was involved in activism on her campus, and took part in protests against the Vietnam War. In 1977, Kingsolver graduated Phi Beta Kappa with a Bachelor of Science, and moved to France for a year. In 1980, she enrolled in graduate school at the University of Arizona, where she earned a master's degree in ecology and evolutionary biology.

In 1985, Kingsolver married Joseph Hoffmann, and gave birth to their daughter Camille in 1987. During the first First Gulf War, she moved with her daughter to Tenerife in the Canary Islands for a year, mostly due to her frustration over America's military involvement. After returning to the United States in 1992, she separated from her husband.

In 1994, Kingsolver was awarded an honorary Doctorate of Letters from her alma mater, DePauw University. That same year, she married Steven Lee Hopp, an ornithologist, and their daughter Lily was born in 1996. In 2004, Kingsolver moved with her family to a farm in Washington County, Virginia. In 2008, she received an honorary Doctorate of Humane Letters from Duke University, where she delivered a commencement address entitled "How to Be Hopeful".

In the late 1990s, Kingsolver was a founding member of the Rock Bottom Remainders, a rock-and-roll band made up of published writers. Other band members included Amy Tan, Matt Groening, Dave Barry, and Stephen King, and they played for one week during the year. Kingsolver played the keyboard, but is no longer an active member of the band.

In a 2010 interview with The Guardian, Kingsolver said, "I never wanted to be famous, and still don't… the universe rewarded me with what I dreaded most". She said she created her own website just to compete with a plethora of fake ones "as a defense to protect my family from misinformation".

Kingsolver lives in the Appalachia area of the United States. She said in 2020 that rural America is generally regarded by artistic elites with "a profound antipathy".

== Writing career ==
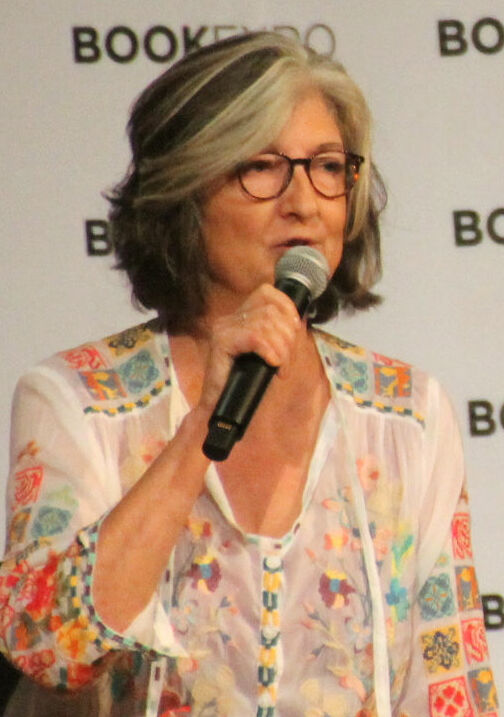
Kingsolver speaking at BookExpo America in 2018

Kingsolver began her full-time writing career in the mid-1980s as a science writer for the University of Arizona, which eventually led to freelance feature writing, including many cover stories for the local alternative weekly, the Tucson Weekly. She began her career in fiction writing after winning a short-story contest in a local Phoenix newspaper.

Kingsolver's first novel, The Bean Trees, was published in 1988, and told the story of a young woman who leaves Kentucky for Arizona, adopting an abandoned child along the way; she wrote it at night while pregnant with her first child and struggling with insomnia. Her next work of fiction, published in 1990, was Homeland and Other Stories, a collection of short stories on a variety of topics exploring various themes from the evolution of cultural and ancestral lands to the struggles of marriage.

The novel Animal Dreams was also published in 1990, followed by Pigs in Heaven, the sequel to The Bean Trees, in 1993. Every book that Kingsolver has written since Pigs in Heaven has been on The New York Times Best Seller list.

The Poisonwood Bible, published in 1998, is one of her best-known works; it chronicles the lives of the wife and daughters of a Baptist missionary on a Christian mission in Africa. Although the setting of the novel is somewhat similar to Kingsolver's own childhood in the Democratic Republic of Congo (then Zaire), the novel is not autobiographical. The novel was chosen as an Oprah's Book Club selection. The Poisonwood Bible won the National Book Prize of South Africa and was shortlisted for both the Pulitzer Prize and PEN/Faulkner Award.

Her next novel, published in 2000, was Prodigal Summer, set in southern Appalachia. In 2000, she was awarded the National Humanities Medal by the U.S. President Bill Clinton.

Kingsolver wrote a Los Angeles Times opinion piece following the U.S. bombing of Afghanistan in the wake of the September 11 attacks, which received widespread criticism for conflating innocent Afghans with the Taliban regime. She wrote, "I feel like I'm standing on a playground where the little boys are all screaming at each other, 'He started it!' and throwing rocks that keep taking out another eye, another tooth. I keep looking around for somebody's mother to come on the scene saying, 'Boys! Boys! Who started it cannot possibly be the issue here. People are getting hurt.'" By some accounts, she was "denounced as a traitor," but rebounded from these accusations and later wrote about them.

Starting in April 2005, Kingsolver and her family spent a year making every effort to eat food produced as locally as possible. Living on their farm in rural Virginia, they grew much of their own food and obtained most of the rest from their neighbors and other local farmers. Kingsolver, her husband, and her elder daughter chronicled their experiences of that year in the book Animal, Vegetable, Miracle: A Year of Food Life, published in 2007. Although exceptions were made for staple ingredients not available locally, such as coffee and olive oil, the family grew vegetables, raised livestock, made cheese, and preserved much of their harvest. Animal, Vegetable, Miracle won the 2008 James Beard Foundation Award.

Kingsolver returned to novel-writing with The Lacuna, published in 2009. Kingsolver received her first Women's Prize for Fiction for the novel in 2010. The Lacuna won the 2010 Orange Prize for Fiction. Flight Behavior was published in 2012. It explores environmental themes and highlights the potential effects of global warming on the monarch butterfly.

In 2011, Kingsolver was the first ever recipient of the Dayton Literary Peace Prize Richard C. Holbrooke Distinguished Achievement Award. The newly named award to celebrate the U.S. diplomat who played an instrumental role in negotiating the Dayton Peace Accords in 1995. In 2014, Kingsolver was awarded the Lifetime Achievement Award by the Library of Virginia. The award recognizes outstanding and long-lasting contributions to literature by a Virginian. In 2018 the Library of Virginia named her one of the Virginia Women in History.

Unsheltered was published in 2018 and follows two families in Vineland, New Jersey with one in the 1800s and the other in the aftermath of Hurricane Sandy. Her novel Demon Copperhead, inspired by David Copperfield, was published in 2022. It is set in southern Appalachia, and deals with the effects of the opioid crisis on the region's families. In 2023, Demon Copperhead received the 2023 Pulitzer Prize for Fiction alongside Hernan Diaz's Trust, the first time the award was shared in its history.

Kingsolver is also a published poet and essayist. Two of her essay collections, High Tide in Tucson (1995) and Small Wonder (2003), have been published, and an anthology of her poetry was published in 1998 under the title Another America. A second collection of poetry, entitled How to Fly (In Ten Thousand Easy Lessons) was published in 2020. Her essay "Where to Begin" appears in the anthology Knitting Yarns: Writers on Knitting (2013), published by W. W. Norton & Company. Her prose poetry also accompanied photographs by Annie Griffiths Belt in a 2002 work titled Last Stand: America's Virgin Lands.

Her major nonfiction works include her 1990 publication Holding the Line: Women in the Great Arizona Mine Strike of 1983 and 2007's Animal, Vegetable, Miracle, a description of eating locally. She has also been published as a science journalist in periodicals such as Economic Botany on topics such as desert plants and bioresources.

== Bellwether Prize ==
In 2000, Kingsolver established the Bellwether Prize for Fiction. Named for the bellwether, the literary prize supports writers whose works support positive social change. The award is given to a U.S. citizen for a previously unpublished work of fiction that addresses issues of social justice. The Bellwether Prize is awarded in even-numbered years and includes guaranteed major publication and a cash prize of US$25,000, fully funded by Kingsolver. She has stated that she wanted to create a literary prize to "encourage writers, publishers, and readers to consider how fiction engages visions of social change and human justice". In May 2011, the PEN American Center announced it would take over administration of the prize, to be known as the PEN/Bellwether Prize for Socially Engaged Fiction.

== Literary style and themes ==
Kingsolver has written novels in both the first-person and third-person narrative styles, and she frequently employs overlapping narratives.

Kingsolver often writes about places and situations with which she is familiar; many of her stories are based in places she has lived, such as Central Africa, Arizona, and Appalachia. She has stated that her novels are not autobiographical, although there are often commonalities between her life and her work. Her work is often strongly idealistic and has been called a form of activism.

Her characters are frequently written around struggles for social equality, such as the hardships faced by undocumented immigrants, the working poor, and single mothers. Other common themes in her work include the balancing of individuality with the desire to live in a community, and the interaction and conflict between humans and the ecosystems in which they live. Kingsolver has been said to use prose and engaging narratives to make historical events, such as the Congo's struggles for independence, more interesting and engaging for the average reader.

== Awards and honors ==
Work	Year & Award	Category	Result	Ref.
Pigs in Heaven	1993 Los Angeles Times Book Prize	Fiction	Won	
Pigs in Heaven	1994 Bronze Wrangler	Western Novel	Won	
The Poisonwood Bible	1999 PEN/Faulkner Award for Fiction		Shortlisted	
The Poisonwood Bible	1999 Women's Prize for Fiction		Shortlisted	
The Poisonwood Bible	1999 Pulitzer Prize for Fiction		Finalist	
The Poisonwood Bible	1999 Ippy Awards	Audio Fiction	Won	
The Poisonwood Bible	2000 Exclusive Books Boeke Prize	Judge's Award	Won	
Animal, Vegetable, Miracle	2008 Audie Awards	Narration by the Author	Finalist	
Animal, Vegetable, Miracle	2008 Library of Virginia	Virginia Literary Awards (Non-Fiction)	Nominated	
Animal, Vegetable, Miracle	2008 Common Wealth Award of Distinguished Service	Non-Fiction	Won	
Animal, Vegetable, Miracle	2008 Indies Choice Book Awards	Adult Non-Fiction	Won	
Animal, Vegetable, Miracle	2008 James Beard Foundation award	Writing on Food	Won	
Animal, Vegetable, Miracle	2008 Southern Book Prize	Non-Fiction	Won	
The Lacuna	2010 PEN/Faulkner Award for Fiction		Shortlisted	
The Lacuna	2010 Women's Prize for Fiction		Won	
The Lacuna	2010 Library of Virginia	Virginia Literary Awards (Fiction)	Won	
The Lacuna	2011 International Dublin Literary Award		Shortlisted	
Flight Behavior	2012 Goodreads Choice Awards	Fiction	Nominated	
Flight Behavior	2013 Women's Prize for Fiction		Shortlisted	
Unsheltered	2018 Goodreads Choice Awards	Historical Fiction	Nominated	
Unsheltered	2019 BookTube Prize	Fiction	Octofinalist	
How to Fly (In Ten Thousand Easy Lessons)	2020 Goodreads Choice Awards	Poetry	Nominated	
Demon Copperhead	2022 James Tait Black Memorial Prize	Fiction Award	Won	
Demon Copperhead	2022 Goodreads Choice Awards	Fiction	Nominated	
Demon Copperhead	2023 Women's Prize for Fiction		Won	
Demon Copperhead	2023 Books Are My Bag Readers' Awards	Fiction	Nominated	
Demon Copperhead	2023 Orwell Prize	Political Fiction	Shortlisted	
Demon Copperhead	2023 Library of Virginia	Virginia Literary Awards (Fiction)	Nominated	
Demon Copperhead	2023 BookTube Prize	Fiction	Gold Medal	
Demon Copperhead	2023 Pulitzer Prize for Fiction		Won	
Demon Copperhead	2024 British Book Awards	Page-turner of the Year	Nominated	

Note: Kingsolver's Women's Prize for Fiction win for Demon Copperhead made her the first person to win the award twice.

Other Awards

- Arizona Civil Liberties Union Award
- Won the National Humanities Medal in 2000.
- Won the Dayton Literary Peace Prize's "Richard C. Holbrooke Distinguished Achievement Award" in 2011.
- In 2014, won the Library of Virginia's Virginia Literary Awards' Lifetime Achievement award.
- In 2018, recognized & honored as "Virginia Women in History".
- Inducted into the American Academy of Arts and Letters for Literature in 2021.
- Received the National Book Foundation's 2024 Medal for Distinguished Contributions to American Letters (DCAL).
- In 2026, Kingsolver was awarded the John Steinbeck Award.

== Works ==
=== Fiction ===
- The Bean Trees, 1988, 1st UK edition 1989, Limited edition (200) 1992
- Homeland and Other Stories, 1989
- Animal Dreams, 1990
- Pigs in Heaven, 1993
- The Poisonwood Bible, 1998
- Prodigal Summer, 2000
- The Lacuna, 2009
- Flight Behavior, 2012
- Unsheltered, 2018
- Demon Copperhead, 2022
- Partita, 2026

=== Essays ===
- High Tide in Tucson: Essays from Now or Never, 1995, also: Limited edition (150) 1995
- Small Wonder: Essays, 2002

=== Poetry ===
- Another America, 1992
- How to Fly (In Ten Thousand Easy Lessons), 2020

=== Nonfiction ===
- Holding the Line: Women in the Great Arizona Mine Strike of 1983, 1989, ISBN 9780875461564
- Last Stand: America's Virgin Lands, 2002 (with photographer Annie Griffiths Belt) ISBN 9780792269090
- Animal, Vegetable, Miracle: A Year of Food Life, 2007 (with Steven L. Hopp and Camille Kingsolver) ISBN 9780062653055
