= Flight Behavior =

2012 novel by Barbara Kingsolver

- 1st edition cover
- Author: Barbara Kingsolver
- Language: American English
- Genre: Novel
- Publisher: HarperCollins
- Publication date: 2012
- Publication place: United States
- Pages: 600
- ISBN: 978-0-06-212427-2
- Preceded by: The Lacuna
- Followed by: Unsheltered

Flight Behavior is a 2012 novel by Barbara Kingsolver. It is her seventh novel and a New York Times bestseller.

== Plot ==
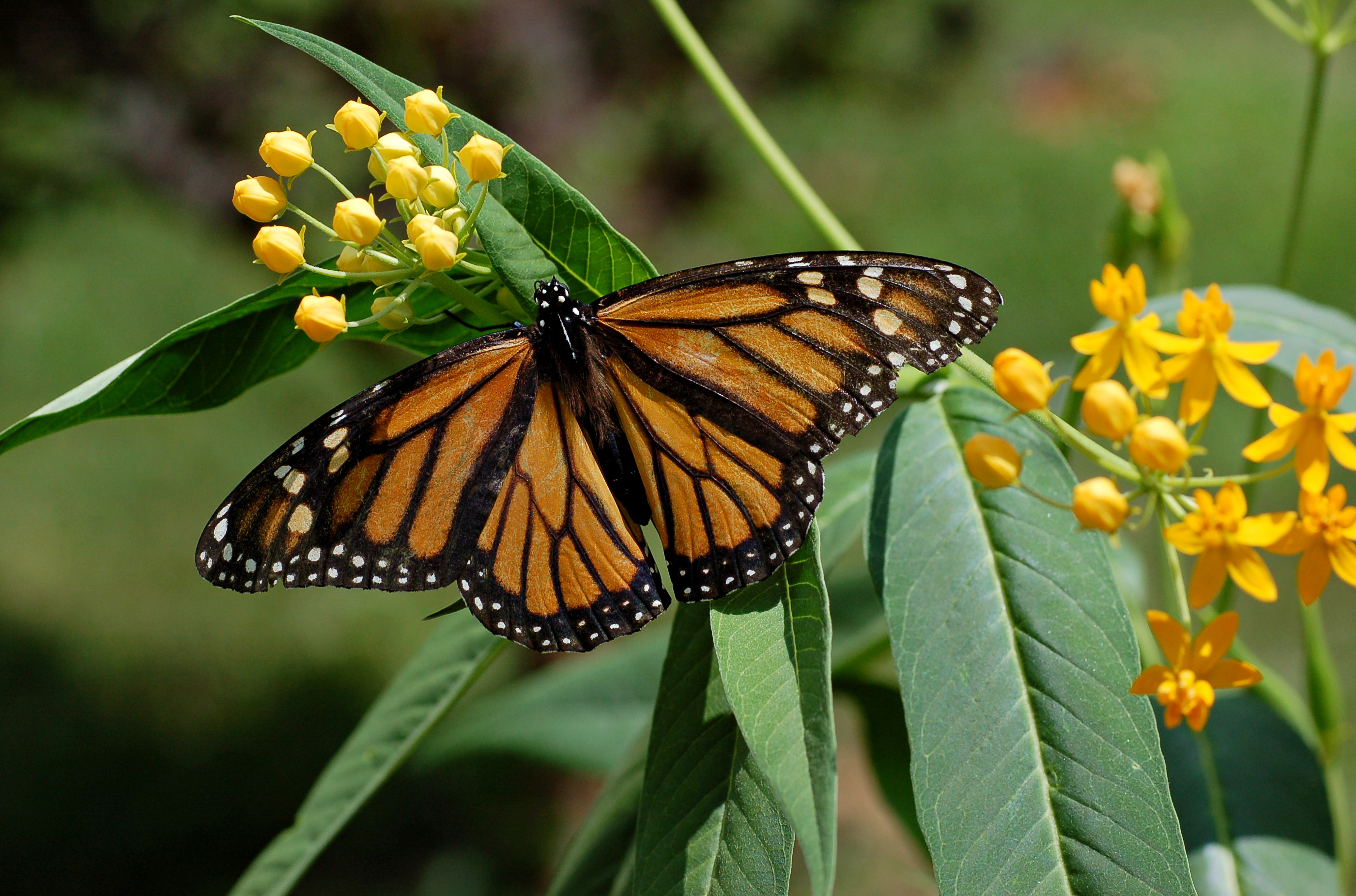
A monarch butterfly.

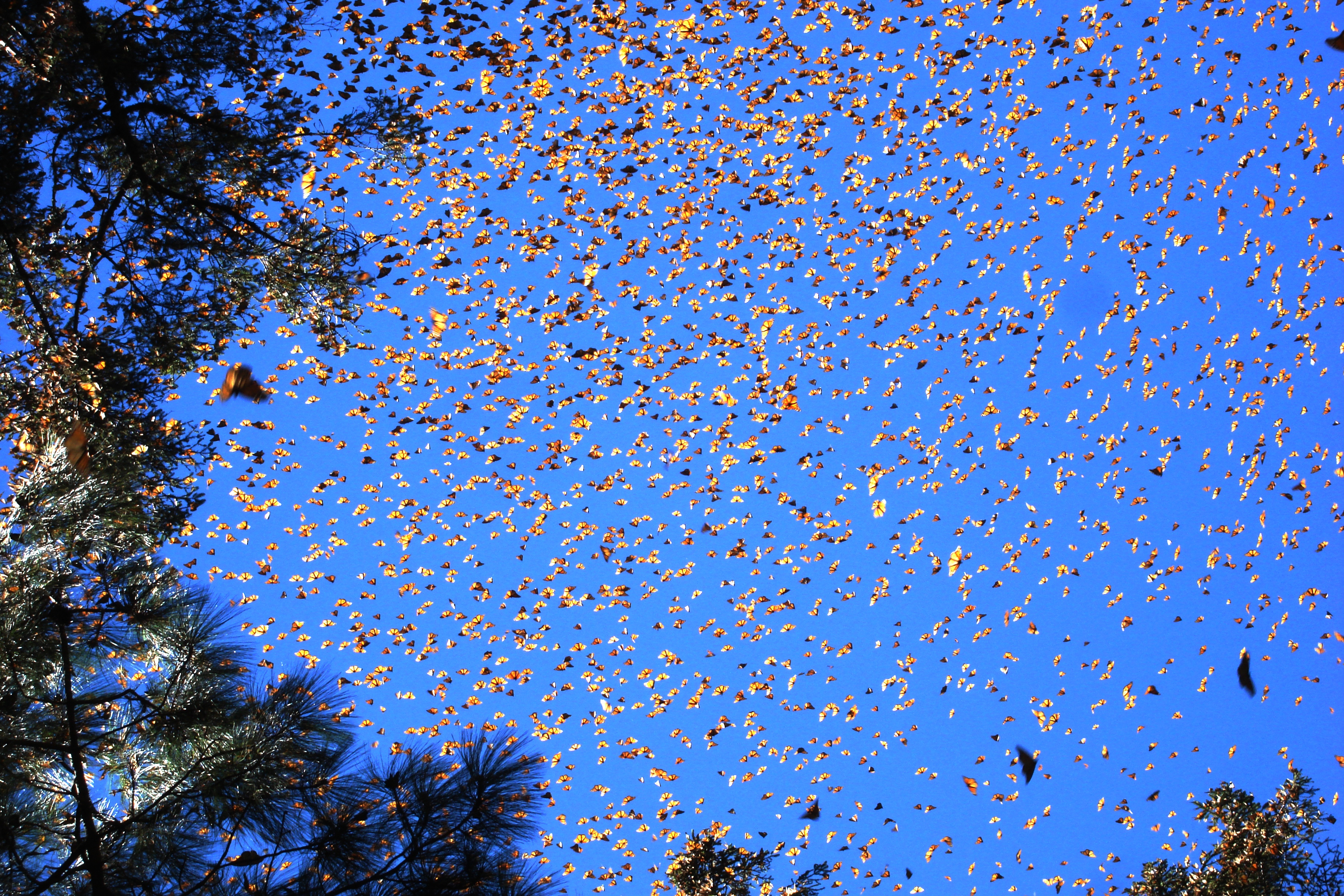
In Flight Behavior, alteration of monarch butterflies migration symbolizes a changing world.

Dellarobia Turnbow is a 28-year-old discontented housewife living with her poor family on a farm in Appalachia. On a hike to begin an affair with a telephone repairman, Turnbow finds millions of monarch butterflies in the valley behind her home.

As the news of her discovery spreads, university professor Ovid Byron arrives to study the monarchs, and warns that although they are beautiful, they are a disturbing symptom of global climate change, displaced from their established winter habitat in Mexico, and that they may not survive the harsh Tennessee winter.

== Critical reception ==
Writing in UK Sunday newspaper The Observer, Robin McKie found,

"In general, Flight Behaviour is an impressive work. It is complex, elliptical and well-observed. Dellarobia and her kin come over as solid but believable individuals, outlined with respect and balance. Even Cub, her much put-upon simpleton of a husband, and his dreadful, manipulative mother Hester, are ultimately accorded sympathy".

McKie was less impressed with Kingsolver's portrayal, "almost to the point of overkill", of the Turnbow family's poverty. "However", he added, "it is the issue of climate change that hangs, unspoken, over proceedings", and concluded by saying, "[...] Kingsolver makes her message clear. If only a few more scientists started screaming on TV and radio then we might have a chance to avoid the worst of the calamities that lie ahead".

In The Daily Telegraph, Beth Jones noted that, "Kingsolver has carved a career from examining social issues in her novels, from economic inequality to racism. In Flight Behaviour, it's the causes and consequences of climate change that form the novel's core. As lepidopterist Ovid Bryon shouts: 'For God's sake… the damn globe is catching fire and the islands are drowning. The evidence is staring [you] in the face'". Jones found that, "[...] in Flight Behaviour she once again manages to make a global crisis seem relevant through tiny domestic details", before concluding that, "The result is a compelling plot with lyrical passages and flashes of humour. Absorbing and entertaining, Flight Behaviour engages the reader in the quotidian details of Dellarobia's life, while insisting that we never forget the crumbling world beneath her, and our, feet".

Reviewing the book in The New York Times, Dominique Browning wrote of

"the intricate tapestry of Barbara Kingsolver's majestic and brave new novel", adding, "Her subject is both intimate and enormous, centered on one woman, one family, one small town no one has ever heard of — until Dellarobia stumbles into a life-altering journey of conscience. How do we live, Kingsolver asks, and with what consequences, as we hurtle toward the abyss in these times of epic planetary transformation? And make no mistake about it, the stakes are that high. Postapocalyptic times, and their singular preoccupation with survival, look easy compared with this journey to the end game. Yet we must also deal with the pinching boots of everyday life. [...] One of the gifts of a Kingsolver novel is the resplendence of her prose. She takes palpable pleasure in the craft of writing, creating images that stay with the reader long after her story is done".

== See also ==
- Climate fiction
- Don't Even Think About It
- Entomology
