= The Portable Veblen =

2016 novel by Elizabeth McKenzie

- First edition
- Author: Elizabeth McKenzie
- Language: English
- Genre: Fiction
- Published: 2016 (Penguin Press)
- Publication place: USA
- Media type: Print (Hardback)
- Pages: 430
- ISBN: 9781594206856
- OCLC: 908176081

The Portable Veblen is a 2016 novel by Elizabeth McKenzie. It is about a young woman, Veblen, and her relationships with her fiancé Paul, their families, and squirrels.

== Reception ==
The New York Times described The Portable Veblen as "a screwball comedy with a dash of mental illness; a conventional tale of family pathos; a sendup of Big Pharma; a meditation on consumption, marriage, the nature of work." and concluded that it "is a novel of such festive originality that it would be a shame to miss."

The Portable Veblen has also been reviewed by The Guardian, Library Journal, Booklist, Slate, the Los Angeles Times, The Irish Times, Kirkus Reviews. the Financial Times, the Star Tribune, and Publishers Weekly.

It was on the 2016 National Book Award longlist, and the 2016 Baileys Prize for Women's Fiction shortlist.
