= Animal, Vegetable, Miracle =

2007 non-fiction book by Barbara Kingsolver

- US hardback cover
- Author: Barbara Kingsolver
- Language: English
- Subject: Food, Industrial agriculture, Organic food, Cooking, Memoir
- Genre: Non-fiction
- Publisher: HarperCollins
- Publication date: May 1, 2007
- Publication place: United States
- Media type: Print (Paperback)
- Pages: 384 pp
- ISBN: 978-0-06-085255-9
- OCLC: 77573806
- Dewey Decimal: 641.0973 22
- LC Class: S521.5.A67 K56 2007

Animal, Vegetable, Miracle: A Year of Food Life (2007) is a non-fiction book by Barbara Kingsolver detailing her family's attempt to eat only locally grown food for an entire year.

== Description ==
The book revolves around the concept of improving the family's diet by eating only foods that her family was able to grow themselves or obtain locally (save for grains and olive oil). Kingsolver, along with her husband and daughters, start a farm in Virginia where they grow and can different varieties of tomatoes, learn about rooster husbandry, make cheese, and adjust to eating foods only when they are locally in season. The book contrasts this with the ecological costs of growing food in factory farms, transporting it thousands of miles, and adding chemical preservatives so it will not spoil.

A book excerpt in the May/June 2007 issue of Mother Jones magazine is available online. An audio recording of a May 16, 2007 discussion between Kingsolver and her husband at an hour-long bookstore presentation in Corte Madera, California is also available.

== Critical reception ==
Time magazine's Lev Grossman named it one of the Top 10 Nonfiction Books of 2007, ranking it at #7. Rick Bass wrote in The Boston Globe that "this text will fold quietly into the reader's consciousness, with affecting grace and dignity, because of its prose and sensibilities." Bass also said that "Kingsolver is no pious soapboxer, but instead explores these ideas with enthusiasm and the awe of discovery."

== See also ==
- Local food
