= Aube Rey Lescure =

French-Chinese-American writer and translator

- Occupation: Novelist
- Writing career
- Notable works: River East, River West
- Notable awards: Shortlisted for the Women's Prize for Fiction 2024
- Website: www.aubereylescure.com

Aube Rey Lescure is a French–Chinese–American writer whose debut novel River East, River West has been shortlisted for the 2024 Women's Prize for Fiction.

== Early life ==
Rey Lescure grew up in northern China, Shanghai and southern France with her French expatriate mother. Her father and Chinese family are from Liaoning province in northeastern China. She moved to the United States when she was 16. She attended Phillips Academy Andover and graduated from Yale University in 2015. She currently lives in Boston.

== Writing career ==
Rey Lescure's debut novel River East, River West was shortlisted for the 2024 Women's Prize for Fiction. It is the only debut novel on the 2024 shortlist. The novel was also shortlisted for the Maya Angelou Book Award, the Carol Shields Prize, and the Stanfords Fiction with a Sense of Place Award. In 2025, it was longlisted for the International Dublin Literary award.
