= Suzanne Berne =

American novelist

- Born: January 17, 1961 (age 65); Washington, D.C., U.S.
- Education: Georgetown Day School; Wesleyan University; Iowa Writers' Workshop
- Occupation: Novelist
- Writing career
- Notable work: A Crime in the Neighborhood (1997)
- Notable awards: Orange Prize for Fiction (1999)

Suzanne Berne (born January 17, 1961, in Washington, D.C.) is an American novelist known for her foreboding character studies involving unexpected domestic and psychological drama in bucolic suburban settings. Berne's debut novel, A Crime in the Neighborhood, won the 1999 Orange Prize for Fiction.

== Life ==
Berne attended Georgetown Day School. She was educated at Wesleyan University and the Iowa Writers' Workshop, and received a National Endowment for the Arts fellowship. Berne has taught at both Harvard University and Wellesley College. She is an associate English professor at Boston College.

Berne currently lives in Boston with her husband and two daughters.

== Career ==
Berne's debut novel, A Crime in the Neighborhood, won the Orange Prize. The novel, set in 1972, is told through the eyes of ten-year-old Marsha, and chronicles the murder of a young boy in a quiet suburb of Washington, D.C., against the backdrop of the unfolding Watergate scandal.

The Ghost at the Table explores the dramatic territory between two sisters' differing versions of their shared history.

A Perfect Arrangement tells of the complex and increasingly disturbing relationship between a normal suburban family and their exceptionally perfect nanny.

== Works ==
- Ladies, Gentlemen, Friends and Relations, University of Iowa, 1985
- A Crime in the Neighborhood: A Novel, Algonquin Books, 1997, ISBN 978-1-56512-165-2
- The Ghost at the Table, Algonquin Books, 1997, (reprint 2007, ISBN 978-1-56512-334-2)
- A Perfect Arrangement: A Novel, Algonquin Books, 2001, ISBN 978-1-56512-261-1
- Missing Lucile: Memories of the Grandmother I Never Knew, Algonquin Books of Chapel Hill, 2010, ISBN 9781565126251
- The Dogs of Littlefield. Simon & Schuster. 2016. ISBN 978-1476794242.
