= When We Were Bad =

2007 novel by Charlotte Mendelson

- Author: Charlotte Mendelson
- Language: English
- Genre: Literary fiction
- Publisher: Houghton Mifflin Harcourt
- Publication date: 13 August, 2007
- Publication place: United Kingdom
- Pages: 366
- ISBN: 978-0-618-88343-1

When We Were Bad is a novel by British author Charlotte Mendelson, published in 2007 by Houghton Mifflin Harcourt. Mendelson's third novel, it was shortlisted for the 2008 Women's Prize for Fiction.

== Summary ==
The story follows a Jewish family led by a female rabbi. Although the family appears perfect to outsiders, each family member hides a secret.

== Reception ==
When We Were Bad received mostly positive reviews from critics. Writing in The Guardian, Viv Groskop said the book was "as intelligent as it is funny" and praised the plot structure and characters.

Kirkus Reviews praised the novel's "astute, affectionately mocking prose" and "wicked but merciful intelligence".

The Jewish Book Council called the book "a good read" but said it was sometimes overwritten.

== Awards ==
In 2008, When We Were Bad was shortlisted for the Women's Prize for Fiction.
