= Cherie Jones =

Barbadian writer and attorney (born 1974)

- Born: 1974 (age 51–52)
- Education: University of the West Indies; Sheffield Hallam University; University of Exeter
- Occupations: Writer and lawyer
- Notable work: How the One-Armed Sister Sweeps Her House (2021)

Cherie Jones (born 1974) is a Barbadian writer. Her debut novel, How the One-Armed Sister Sweeps Her House, was shortlisted for the 2021 Women's Prize for Fiction.

== Biography ==
Cherie Jones was born in 1974.

She received her LLB from the University of the West Indies in 1995 and was admitted to the Bar in Barbados in 1997. She continues to work as a lawyer, in addition to her writing.

In 2015, Jones graduated from the Master of Arts writing program at Sheffield Hallam University, where she received the Archie Markham Award and the A.M. Heath Prize. She went on to complete a PhD in Creative Writing at the University of Exeter.

Jones is a single mother of four children and has spoken openly about being a survivor of domestic violence.

== Writing career ==
Jones won the Commonwealth Short Story Competition in 1999 with her story "Bride".

In 2003, she won second place in the Frank Collymore Literary Endowment Awards for unpublished manuscripts for her short story collection The Burning Bush Women & Other Stories. The collection was published in 2004 by Peepal Tree Press.

In 2016, Jones won third place in the Frank Collymore Literary Endowment Awards for her unpublished interlinked short story collection Water for the End of the World.

In 2021, Jones published her debut novel, How the One-Armed Sister Sweeps Her House. The novel is set in 1984 in the fictional town of Baxter's Beach in Barbados. The title is from a cautionary tale in which a girl disobeys her mother and has to lose her arm to escape the consequences. The main protagonist is Lala, who works as a hair-braider for tourists and is trapped in an abusive marriage to petty criminal Adan. On the night Lala gives birth, Adan is involved in the murder of a rich white tourist. The novel describes the brutal aftermath and the violent backstory of Lala and other characters. It uses multiple viewpoints, including a police detective and the murdered man's widow, and examines issues of race, inequality, and cycles of abuse and domestic violence.

The novel was the Good Morning America monthly book club pick in February 2021. It was shortlisted for the 2021 Women's Prize for Fiction and the 2022 OCM Bocas Prize for Caribbean Literature. The German translation, Wie die einarmige Schwester das Haus fegt, translated by Karen Gerwig, was shortlisted for the 2023 International Literature Award. The French translation, Et d'un seul bras la sœur balaie sa maison, translated by Jessica Shapiro, won the Prix Carbet des lycéens 2023.

Jones is currently working on her second novel.

== Works ==
- —— (2004). The Burning Bush Women & Other Stories. Peepal Tree. ISBN 9781900715584.
- —— (2021). How the One-Armed Sister Sweeps Her House. Little, Brown & Company. ISBN 9780316537001.
