= One by One in the Darkness =

1996 novel by Deidre Madden

- Author: Deirdre Madden
- Language: English
- Publisher: Faber & Faber
- Publication date: 1996
- Publication place: Northern Ireland

One by One in the Darkness is a novel by Northern Irish author Deirdre Madden, published in 1996 by Faber & Faber. The novel explores the Troubles from a Catholic Nationalist point of view. The book was shortlisted for the Women's Prize for Fiction.

== Background ==
Madden began writing the book in 1994, just before the anniversary of British troops arriving in Northern Ireland.

== Summary ==
Three Northern Irish sisters growing up in Ulster deal with political violence during the Troubles.

== Reception ==
In a retrospective review published in 2018, The Irish Times said the book was "more relevant than ever" and said it should be assigned reading in both Northern Ireland and the Republic of Ireland.

The New Hibernia Review noted the book "demonstrates the impossibility of pure forgiveness in the circumstances".

== Awards ==
One by One in the Darkness was shortlisted for the Women's Prize for Fiction in 1997. The award website said the novel "confirms Deirdre Madden’s reputation as one of Irish fiction’s most outstanding talents."
