= Lives of the Monster Dogs =

Speculative fiction novel by Kirsten Bakis

- First edition cover
- Author: Kirsten Bakis
- Language: English
- Genre: Fantasy
- Publisher: Farrar, Straus & Giroux
- Publication date: 1997
- Media type: Print
- Pages: 291
- Awards: Bram Stoker Award for Best First Novel
- ISBN: 0-374-18987-0
- OCLC: 34943262
- LC Class: PS3552.A436L58 1997
- Text: Lives of the Monster Dogs at Internet Archive
- Website: us.macmillan.com/books/9780374537142/livesofthemonsterdogs

Lives of the Monster Dogs (1997) is a novel by Kirsten Bakis first published by Farrar, Straus & Giroux. It was named a New York Times Notable Book of the year in 1997, and one of the Best Books of the Year by the Village Voice. It was shortlisted for the Orange Prize for Fiction, and won the Bram Stoker Award for Best First Novel. It has been translated into eight languages and made into a stage play.

== Reviews ==
The New York Times called it "haunting, fiercely original . . . a dazzling, unforgettable meditation on what it means to be human."

== Film ==
In 2010 it was reported that the book had been optioned for possible development as a movie.
