= Patricia Wood =

American novelist

Patricia Wood is an American novelist. Her debut novel, Lottery, was shortlisted for the 2008 Orange Prize for Fiction. In December 2014, she published another novel, Cupidity.

She was born in Seattle, Washington. Wood's father, Ray "R.J." Dahl, worked at Boeing and won $6 million in the Washington State Lottery in 1993. She has several siblings, including a twin and older sisters.

Wood began writing at age 8. She attended Shoreline High School, graduating in 1971. In 1972, she enlisted in the United States Army and served as a medical technologist. After serving in the military, Wood attended Northern Illinois University. She later earned a PhD from the University of Hawaiʻi at Mānoa. She worked as a special education teacher and taught marine science and horseback riding.

On August 2, 2007, Wood published Lottery. The book tells the story of a mildly intellectually disabled man named Peter Crandall who wins the Washington State Lottery. It was shortlisted for the 2008 Orange Prize for Fiction.

Wood currently lives with her husband, Gordon, on a sailboat in Hawaii. She has a son, Andrew.
