= High Tide in Tucson =

1995 book of essays by Barbara Kingsolver

High Tide in Tucson: Essays from Now or Never
- First edition
- Author: Barbara Kingsolver
- Publisher: Harper Collins
- Publication date: 1995

High Tide in Tucson: Essays from Now or Never is a 1995 book of 25 essays by author Barbara Kingsolver exploring ideas such as family, community, ecology and social consciousness. It is titled after the first essay, in which she realizes that a hermit crab she accidentally brought home while beachcombing in the Bahamas still times its activity to the rise and fall of the tides, even in an aquarium in Tucson, Arizona. The crab is a metaphor for a situation in her own life.
