= Emma Henderson =

British writer (born 1958)

Emma Henderson (born 1958) is a British writer. Her first novel, Grace Williams Says It Loud, was shortlisted for the 2011 Orange Prize for Fiction.

== Life ==
Henderson grew up in suburban west London. Her sister Clare Williams (born 1946) was placed in an institution in 1957, judged impossible to educate; she was also partly paralysed due to polio. Clare spent 35 years in hospitals before being released into community care, and died in 1997. This experience, and the guilt and anger it stirred in Henderson, partly inspired her novel Grace Williams Says It Loud. She studied at Somerville College, Oxford.

== Works ==
=== Grace Williams Says It Loud ===
Her 2010 novel is about a woman born in 1947 with severe disabilities and epilepsy who is incarcerated in British mental hospitals for thirty years. Although she has limited powers of speech, the novel presents her internal monologue. Events in the novel include a romance between Grace and Daniel, a male epileptic. The Independent called this relationship "tender and convincing" and the novel "superb". The Guardian called it a "sensitive and generous book", although they found the narration was sometimes too detached from the events it described.
