= Charlotte Mendelson =

English novelist and editor, born 1972

Charlotte Jane Mendelson (born 1 November 1972) is an English novelist and editor. She was placed 60th on the Independent on Sunday "Pink List 2007".

== Biography ==
Charlotte Mendelson was born on 1 November 1972 in London, England, the daughter of a barrister, Maurice Harvey Mendelson. Mendelson's family moved to Oxford when she was two, where her father taught at St John's College, Oxford. She attended Oxford High School and New College, Oxford, where she received a BA degree in Ancient and Modern History. She was an editor at Jonathan Cape in 1996–1997 and at Headline Review in 1998–2014.

Mendelson has been a visiting professor of creative writing at Royal Holloway, University of London, since 2017 and a gardening correspondent at the New Yorker since the same year. She became a Fellow of the Royal Society of Literature in 2018.

== Bibliography ==
- Love in Idleness (2001)
- Daughters of Jerusalem (2003)
- When We Were Bad (2007)
- Almost English (2013)
- Rhapsody In Green (2016)
- The Exhibitionist (2022)
- Wife (2024)

== Awards and nominations ==
- John Llewellyn Rhys Prize
- Somerset Maugham Award
- Sunday Times 'Young Writer of the Year (shortlisted)
- London Arts New London Writers’ Award
- K. Blundell Trust Award
- Le Prince Maurice Roman d’Amour Prize (shortlisted)
- Geoffrey Faber Memorial Prize (shortlisted)
- Man Booker Prize 2013 (longlisted)
- Baileys Women's Prize for Fiction 2014 (longlisted)
- Women's Prize for Fiction 2022 (longlisted for The Exhibitionist)

== Personal life ==
Mendelson lives in London. She has one son and one daughter.
