= A Crime in the Neighborhood =

1997 novel by Suzanne Berne

- First edition
- Author: Suzanne Berne
- Language: English
- Genre: Crime novel, Young Adult
- Published: 1997 (Algonquin Books)
- Pages: 285

A Crime in the Neighborhood is the debut novel by Suzanne Berne. It won the Orange Prize for Fiction in 1999. The story is told through the eyes of a ten-year-old girl, Marsha, and chronicles the murder of a young boy in a sleepy suburb of Washington, D.C. against the backdrop of the unfolding Watergate scandal in the spring and summer of 1972.

== Reception ==
Writing for The New York Times, Jacqueline Carey describes how, "Berne is good at setting these very different-sized aspects side by side -- the larger horror next to the smarmy neediness, neither one obscuring the other." Carey concludes by noting that, "certainly the specifically literary pleasures of this book are many. But I think ''A Crime in the Neighborhood'' feels familiar mainly because so much of it feels true. Although the cruelties that generations can inflict on each other may be freshly rendered here, we can all recognize them far too well." Kirkus Reviews similarly praised the author's writing style and characters: "Berne's skill with language and her talent for evoking believable, all-too-human characters add to this fascinating story of evil and fear, and the unexpected consequences they engender."
