= Deirdre Madden =

Novelist from Northern Ireland

- Born: 20 August 1960 (age 65) Toome, County Antrim, Northern Ireland
- Occupation: Novelist
- Education: St Mary's Grammar School; Trinity College Dublin (BA); University of East Anglia (MA)
- Notable awards: Rooney Prize for Irish Literature (1987); Somerset Maugham Award (1989); Windham–Campbell Literature Prize (2024)

Deirdre Madden (born 20 August 1960) is a novelist and writer of children's books from Northern Ireland. She has won the Windham–Campbell Literature Prize, the Rooney Prize for Irish Literature, and the Hennessy Literary Award and has twice been shortlisted for the Women's Prize for Fiction.

== Life and education ==
Madden was born in Toome, County Antrim. Her father was a sand merchant and her mother was a teacher. She was educated at St Mary's Grammar School in Magherafelt. She took a BA in English at Trinity College, Dublin. Her first stories were published during this time. She then took an MA in creative writing at the University of East Anglia.

She has travelled widely in Europe and has spent extended periods in both France and Italy with her husband, poet Harry Clifton.

In 1994 she was Writer-in-Residence at University College Cork, and in 1997 was a Writer Fellow at Trinity College, Dublin. She is a member of Aosdána.

== Awards and recognition ==
On 2 April 2024, Deirdre Madden was awarded the Windham–Campbell Literature Prize from Yale University, one of the world's most significant literary prizes, for the totality of her work to date.

She has won various other awards, including the 1987 Rooney Prize for Irish Literature for her novel Hidden Symptoms, a 1989 Somerset Maugham Award for writers under 35 years of age for her novel The Birds of the Innocent Wood, and the 1980 Hennessy Literary Award, later (2014) being inducted into the Hennessy Literary Awards Hall of Fame. She has been shortlisted for the Orange Prize twice: first in 1997 for her novel One by One in the Darkness then in 2009 for her novel Molly Fox's Birthday. She has been described as "a pivotal voice in Northern Irish writing, her understated yet complex fictions often touching on the religious and political turmoil of the North".

== Works ==
=== Novels ===
- Hidden Symptoms (1986)
- The Birds of the Innocent Wood (1988)
- Remembering Light and Stone (1993)
- Nothing Is Black (1994)
- One by One in the Darkness (1996)
- Authenticity (2002)
- Molly Fox's Birthday (2008)
- Time Present and Time Past (2013)

=== For children ===
- Snake's Elbows (2005)
- Thanks for Telling Me, Emily (2007)
- Jasper and the Green Marvel (2011)

=== As editor ===
- All Over Ireland: New Irish Short Stories (2015)
