= Lottery (novel) =

2007 novel by Patricia Wood

- Author: Patricia Wood
- Language: English
- Publication date: 2007
- Publication place: United States

Lottery is a 2007 novel by Patricia Wood. Her first published novel, it was shortlisted for the 2008 Orange Prize for Fiction.

== Writing and publication ==
Wood drew on personal experience: her father won $6 million from the Washington state lottery, and her brother-in-law had Down syndrome. Wood wrote the novel in 3 months, and sold it for a reported six-figure deal.

== Plot ==
The novel focuses on Perry Crandall, a man with an IQ of 76, who wins $12 million in a lottery.

== Critical reaction ==
New York Magazine compared it favorably to Forrest Gump, calling it "heartfelt and totally not corny". The Independent gave it a positive review, noting that it wouldn't be to all tastes and sometimes the central character seemed a bit too wise, but found it offered a pleasing story of an underdog's triumph. Blogcritics found it "poignant" and praised the believable depiction of its central character.

The Guardian noted other critics' comparisons to The Curious Incident of the Dog in the Night-time but found it simple-minded with the simplistic morality of pantomime.

== Film adaptation ==
In 2023, Wood sold film rights to production company 3311 Productions and producer David Permut. In April 2026, the film was announced to be in development at Searchlight Pictures. The film will star Keke Palmer and Zack Gottsagen and will be directed by Thor Freudenthal.
