= How the One-Armed Sister Sweeps Her House =

2021 novel by Cherie Jones

- Author: Cherie Jones
- Publisher: Little, Brown & Co.
- Publication date: February 2, 2021
- ISBN: 978-0-316-53698-1

How the One-Armed Sister Sweeps Her House is a 2021 novel by Barbadian attorney and writer Cherie Jones, her debut novel. Loosely based on the author’s experiences, the novel deals with generational trauma, abusive relationships, marriage, and life in Barbados. The novel follows two stories, a beautiful beach paradise, and the truth that lies beneath it all.

It was chosen for the Good Morning America monthly book club in February of 2021. It was short-listed for the 2021 Women’s Prize for Fiction.

== Plot ==
The story follows the principal character, Lala’s history and navigation of her family. The layout of the book moves back and forth between timing and the perspective of individual characters. It starts with the prologue that gives us the title of the book. Wilma tells her orphaned granddaughter, Lala, the story of how the wayward sister lost her arm due to her disobedience.

Five years later, Lala is pregnant and in an abusive marriage to her husband Adan. A carnival unicyclist, drug dealer, and thief. They live together in a beachfront shack atop concrete steps with no banister that the very pregnant Lala must carefully go up and down each day to the beach to braid the hair of tourists.

Lala’s life comes into contact with a white man, Peter Whalen, when one night he is killed by an armed robber. This is told from the perspective of Mira Whalen, Peter’s young second wife, and native islander. She got everything she wanted from her marriage to Peter. The house, the money, the man, but felt broken when she lost “what she has wanted for as long as she can remember.”.

Lala, in a painful labor, runs up the beach to one of the big summer houses that line the beach. She buzzes at the gate of the Whalen house and by some stroke of luck for lala, Adan runs out. They go to the hospital and before Lala can have the baby Adan leaves to make sure the police don’t catch him for the murder he committed just seconds before Lala interrupted.

Lala begins to raise the unnamed child they call Baby on her own as Adan stops by every once in a while when he risks coming out of hiding. He continues abusing Lala and planning more “jobs” with his right hand man, Tone.

One day, Tone stops by the house with a woman named Jacinthe. Lala is holding Baby and demands she must feed her, but Adan wants to show Jacinthe the child. After pulling Baby back and forth a bit, they both give her up at the same time causing her to fall to the ground. Lala and Adan both try to resuscitate the infant but are ultimately unsuccessful. Tone comes up with an idea that will keep Lala and Adan out of jail and shift the blame for Baby's death.

After buying a box of raisins early in the morning, Mira Whalen stumbles upon a group of people on the beach searching for a stolen baby. A rasta man, Tone, leads the effort to find the child of the woman who is sobbing on the beach asking for someone to find her infant. Eventually, he pulls a limp infant from the rocks on the beach. Mira worries about her step-children and leaves.

Wilma arrives on the beach and finds her great granddaughter, whom she never met, dead. She then goes to the police station and recounts her history, her daughter’s, and Lala’s. She talks about being tricked into marrying Carson, Carson molesting Esme resulting in Lala, and how she came to raise Lala. Sergeant Beckles listens to her story and decides he needs to find Adan and speak to him.

He goes to Adan's home and finds a grieving Lala. She answers his questions with rehearsed responses. Once he leaves she runs down to the beach to dig up a tin she hides money in, only to find that Adan had stolen the money from her. She falls asleep waiting for him to get home, thinking of killing him. He gets home and demands her money back but he refuses and simply leaves.

Adan and Tone plan to bring in weed and sell it after hiding it in the tunnels. Tone starts to reject Adan and gets silently angry at him for beating Lala. While this happens, Lala goes to Wilma’s and asks for the money to be able to bury Baby. Adan yells at her for asking for the money because he believes he should be able to pay for his own child’s funeral.

Adan beats Lala half to death. She finds Tone and he gives her a few hundred dollars to be able to leave and promises he will be back with more so they can run together. She runs into Mira Whalen and a rich doctor, Grayson, who lets her stay with him while refusing to let her go back home. Tone goes to move the weed with Adan and learns it's actually cocaine. He and Adan fight and Adan shoots a gun at Mira Whalen who ran into them. Tone runs into the tunnels and leads Adan to fall to his death.

Mira is hospitalized, Lala supposedly leaves on a plane, and Tone is arrested for the murder of Baby.

== Major characters ==
- Wilma/Carson -- Wilma and Carson are married and they had a daughter named Esme. Carson later raped Esme who got pregnant and had Lala. After Esme dies, Wilma takes in her granddaughter Lala and raises her as her own.
- Esme -- Esme is the mother of Lala and the daughter of Carson and Wilma. When she was fourteen, she was raped by Carson. She ended up pregnant and lived with an aunt until she was fifteen and had Lala. After Lala was born, Esme worked in a brothel. She later marries an older man and he ends up murdering her.
- Lala -- Lala is Wilma’s granddaughter. She works as a hair braider for tourists who visit Barbados.
- Adan -- Adan Primus is Lala’s husband, he is very physically abusive. Adan is a criminal and spends majority of the book hiding out from the police. He commits crimes from robbing places to murdering Peter Whalen.
- Baby -- Baby was Lala and Adan’s child who died after a few weeks.
- Tone -- Tone is Adan’s trusted friend and sidekick since boyhood, they go out on adventures at night together. He was first arrested for fighting someone at 15 years old and was arrested multiple times after that. Tone loves Lala even though Adan is married to Lala.
- Mira Whalen -- Mira Whalen is a young girl from Barbados who married Peter Whalen. For most of the year they live in Wimbledon, but for three months, they rent a house in Barbados. Peter is murdered during their vacation and she is left distraught and traumatized.
- Peter Whalen -- Peter Whalen is a white man who is married to Mira, and father to Beth and Sam. He is a Hedge Fund Manager from England. When vacationing with his first wife in Barbados, he meets Mira and falls in love with her. Years later, Peter is murdered by Adan. His murder and subsequent investigation are a central part of the book and connect all the characters' stories.
- Sergeant Beckles -- Sergeant Beckles is a policeman. He was on the case of the Whalen murder but was stumped on it so he reluctantly hands the case to Scotland Yard. He is left with the death of a baby. Beckles has a wife but he thinks he is in love with the Queen of Sheba.

== Style ==
In a review for The Washington Post, Hamilton Cain called the novel "a stunner", writing that Jones’s prose is “supple, often luxuriant, but the structure of her novel is even more impressive as she bobs and weaves through the aftermath of two mysterious crimes."

== Reception ==
Kirkus Reviews described the book as "compelling and terribly sad", which was echoed by Rhiannon Lucy Cosslett from The Guardian. Publishers Weekly also complimented the characters.

In 2021, How the One-Armed Sister Sweeps Her House was shortlisted for the Women’s Prize for Fiction and was selected as a Good Morning America Book Club pick.
