= Unsheltered (novel) =

2018 novel by Barbara Kingsolver

- First edition
- Author: Barbara Kingsolver
- Language: American English
- Genre: Novel
- Publisher: HarperCollins
- Publication date: 2018
- Publication place: United States
- Pages: 464
- ISBN: 978-0-06-268456-1
- OCLC: 1019922367
- Preceded by: Flight Behavior

Unsheltered is a 2018 novel by Barbara Kingsolver published by HarperCollins. It follows two families living in the same house at two separate time periods in Vineland, New Jersey. The novel alternates between the 21st century and the 19th century, using the last words of one chapter as the title of the next one. One family lived in the house in the 1800s and the other family resides in the house in the aftermath of Hurricane Sandy.

== Plot ==
Unsheltered follows two parallel narratives set in Vineland, New Jersey, in the late nineteenth century and the present day, both centered on the same deteriorating house.

Willa Knox and her husband, Iano Tavoularis, in the present-day storyline, face financial instability after losing their careers. They move into an inherited home with Iano's sick father, Nick, and their two adult children: Tig, a rebellious and independent young woman, and Zeke, who returns home with his infant son following a personal tragedy. As the family struggles with accumulating debt and uncertainty, Willa begins researching the history of the house in hopes of securing historical preservation funding to repair it.

Her research leads to the story of Thatcher Greenwood, whose life in the 1870s forms the novel's second narrative. Thatcher, a science teacher, faces professional and social conflict after attempting to teach Charles Darwin's theory of evolution in a community that rejects it. He lives in the same house with his wife Rose, her mother Aurelia, and her sister Polly, all of whom are concerned with maintaining social status despite the home's structural instability. Thatcher's views isolate him within the town, but he finds intellectual companionship in his neighbor, Mary Treat, a scientist.

Both timelines show families faced with economic hardship, social pressures, and cultural norms. As the integrity of the house declines in both time periods, the characters struggle with their uncertain futures.

== Major characters ==
21st century:

- Willa Knox – journalist
- Iano Tavoularis – PhD in political science, her husband
- Tig (Antigone) – Willa and Iano's daughter
- Zeke – Willa and Iano's son
- Nick – Iano's irascible father
- Dixie – the dog
- Helene – Zeke's girlfriend, who committed suicide
- Aldus (Dusty) – Zeke and Helene's infant son
- Athena, Lita, and Irini – Iano's sisters
- Christopher Hawk – museum curator
- Jorge – Neighbor boy, Tig's boyfriend

19th century (some modelled on real persons):

- Thatcher Greenwood – BS in Biology
- Rose – his wife
- Mary Treat – neighbor (real-life naturalist, botanist, entomologist); next-door neighbor
- Polly – Rose's sister
- Aurelia – Rose's mother
- Selma – Mary's servant girl/botany assistant
- Captain Charles K. Landis – Vineland's founder, mayor and land agent
- Professor Cutler – principal of school where Thatcher teaches; toady to Landis
- Uri Carruth – editor of rival paper
- Charybdis & Scylla – dogs of the Greenwood family

== Reception and awards ==
Writing in the New York Times, Meg Wolitzer, says this book "lures us into" this story about a house and the two different families that occupy it during two different periods of time. Ilana Masad states in her NPR review that by the end of the novel "Kingsolver doesn't give us solutions, but she reminds us to take comfort in one another when we can, and that hope is necessary even when all seems lost." Benjamin Evans' review in The Guardian notes, "Unlike the incompetent architect of the house in her latest book, Unsheltered, American novelist Barbara Kingsolver has proved herself a supreme craftsperson over the past three decades. She possesses a knack for ingenious metaphors that encapsulate the social questions at the heart of her stories."
