= Marilyn Bowering =

Canadian poet, novelist and playwright

- Born: April 13, 1949 (age 77); Winnipeg, Manitoba
- Education: University of Victoria
- Occupations: Poet, novelist and playwright

Marilyn Bowering (born April 13, 1949) is a Canadian poet, novelist and playwright. As well as several adventure novels and many books of poetry, Bowering has also scripted a number of dramatic works and a libretto.

== Personal life ==
Bowering was born in Winnipeg, Manitoba, and grew up in Victoria, British Columbia. She studied English at the University of Victoria, and graduated with a Master of Arts degree.

Bowering presently lives in Sooke, British Columbia; she is married and has one daughter.

== Career ==
In 1987, Bowering wrote a book of poetic monologues, titled Anyone Can See I Love You, which was later adapted as a radio drama. In 1998, she wrote an adventure story, Visible Worlds, which received positive reviews.

In 2012, her book of poetry, Soul Mouth, was published.

In 2013, Bowering worked with composer Gavin Bryars to create the libretto for a chamber opera, Marilyn Forever, about Marilyn Monroe.

== Awards and honours ==
- National Magazine Award for Poetry, Gold 1978
- Nominated for the 1984 Governor General's Award (The Sunday Before Winter)
- National Magazine Award for Poetry, Silver 1989
- Long Poem Prize, The Malahat Review, 1994
- Pat Lowther Award for poetry, 1997 (Autobiography)
- Nominated for the 1997 Governor General's Award (Autobiography)
- Nominated for the 1997 Dorothy Livesay Poetry Prize (Autobiography)
- Ethel Wilson Fiction Prize, 1998 (Visible Worlds)
- Short-listed for the Orange Prize, 1999 (Visible Worlds)
- Short-listed for the Dorothy Livesay Poetry Prize, 2004 (The Alchemy of Happiness)
- Short-listed for the Ethel Wilson Fiction Prize 2007 (What It Takes to Be Human)

== Publications ==
=== Novels ===
- The Visitors Have All Returned - 1979
- To All Appearances a Lady - 1989
- Visible Worlds - 1997
- Cat's Pilgrimage - 2004
- What It Takes to Be Human - 2007
- The Unfinished World - 2025

=== Poetry ===
- The Liberation of Newfoundland - 1973
- One Who Became Lost - 1976
- The Killing Room - 1977
- The Book of Glass- 1978
- Sleeping With Lambs - 1980
- Giving Back Diamonds - 1982
- The Sunday Before Winter - 1984
- Selected Poems - 1986
- Grandfather was a Soldier - 1987
- Anyone Can See I Love You - 1987
- Calling All the World - 1989
- Love As It Is - 1993
- Autobiography - 1996
- Human Bodies: Collected Poems 1987-1999 - 1999
- The Alchemy of Happiness - 2003
- Green - 2007
- Soul Mouth - 2012
- Threshold - 2015
- What Is Long Past Occurs In Full Light - 2019
- Frayed Linens - 2025

=== Other ===
- Many Voices, An anthology of contemporary Canadian Indian Poetry, co-edited with D. Day. - 1977
- In Fine Form: The Canadian Book of Form Poetry, edited by Kate Braid and Sandy Shreve - 2005
- More Richly In Earth: A Poet’s Search for Mary MacLeod - 2024

=== Drama ===
- Anyone Can See I Love You - 1988
- Hajimari-No-Hajimari, four myths of the Pacific Rim - 1986
- Temple of the Stars - 1996

=== Radio ===
- Grandfather was a Soldier - 1983
- Anyone Can See I Love You - 1986
- Laika and Folchakov, a Journey in Time and Space - 1987
- A Cold Departure, the Liaison of George Sand and Frederic Chopin -1989
