= The Bees (novel) =

2014 debut novel by Laline Paull

- Author: Laline Paull
- Language: English
- Genre: Science fiction
- Publisher: 4th Estate
- Publication date: 2014
- Publication place: United Kingdom
- Pages: 346
- ISBN: 978-0-00-755774-5

The Bees was the debut novel of British writer Laline Paull, nominated for the 2015 Baileys Women's Prize for Fiction.

== Summary ==
=== Form and setting ===
The novel opens and closes with a brief frame narrative describing the human owners of an orchard on the edge of a town, in which lies the beehive of an elderly beekeeper. Otherwise, The Bees is set within the world of this hive of honeybees. It is a third-person narrative, told from the point of view of one worker bee, Flora 717.

The world of the hive is portrayed in ways which blend human and apian ways of apprehending the world. For example, the world of the hive, most of whose inhabitants are biological sisters, is conceptualised in ways that evoke a medieval Christian nunnery, with the queen bee thought of as a divine mother-figure evoking the Virgin Mary in Roman Catholicism; the small number of male drones are conceptualised as rambunctious, ruff-wearing knights; rooms include nurseries and the Chapel of Wax; the hum of the bees in the hive is conceptualised as the Holy Chord. The bees frequently apprehend the world through scent, which the novel often describes in concrete terms (for example, "Sister Sage curled a filament of her own scent around Flora's antennae", pp. 30–31).

Hive society is divided into different kin groups with specific roles, named after flowers. For example, the Sage are priestesses, the Thistle are guardians, and the Teasel are wetnurses. Those bees who have individual personal names are also named after flowers. The kin at the bottom of the hive's social hierarchy, too despised to be named after a specific flower, are the Flora, who are viewed as ugly, smelly, unable to talk, and serve as sanitation workers, clearing the hive of debris and corpses. Bees from diverse kin may become foragers, flying away from the hive to gather food. A further social role is being a member of the "fertility police", who kill infirm or deviant bees.

A regular feature of the bees' day is "Devotion", when the Queen's scent permeates the hive, the bees hum the Holy Chord, and the sisters of the hive experience a sense of union with one another and with their Holy Mother the Queen.

=== Plot ===
The story begins with the emergence from pupation of the protagonist, Flora 717, who faces prejudice and abuse throughout the story on account of her despised status. She is, however, larger and darker than most Flora, and born able to speak. For these reasons, the fertility police plan to kill her, but a cold and rainy summer has left the hive short-handed, and the priestess Sister Sage intervenes to save the talented heroine. Sister Sage sets Flora 717 to work in the nursery, feeding royal jelly (referred to by the bees as "flow") to the larvae. There Flora witnesses the fertility police destroying eggs laid by any bee other than the Queen, as well as any bee suspected of laying those eggs. Refusing to co-operate with the fertility police, Flora is threatened with execution but again saved by Sister Sage, who sends her to work in Sanitation. In this role, Flora encounters various areas of the hive (such as the Fanning Hall, where nectar is reduced into honey) and sections of hive society (such as the drones, who are entitled, demanding, adored by the sisters, and given to sexual harassment; Flora narrowly avoids being raped). Flora's work as a corpse-bearer takes her out of the hive for the first time.

Flora takes a central role in killing an attacking wasp and is rewarded with an audience with the Queen. The Queen's ladies in waiting take Flora to the Holy Library, a hexagonal chamber the scents of whose walls contain six key chapters in the collective memory of the hive. Flora gets to read its scent panels, learning of predators outside the hive, "the Kindness" (the practice of killing infirm, deviant, or elderly bees), what the reader recognises as the robbery of honey by humans, and other phenomena which she struggles to comprehend. Flora learns that the Queen is not in good health, before being chased away by the ladies in waiting.

Hurt by her separation from the Queen and finding herself unable to participate in Devotion, Flora aspires to become a forager. Before she does, disaster strikes the foragers when they collect pollen from a field of rape that has been doused with pesticide, bringing illness and polluted food into the hive. The venerable forager Lily 500, who had signalled this food source to other foragers before the pesticide was sprayed, is unfairly killed by the fertility police, but before her death she is able to transmit her store of foraging data to Flora.

At this point, the story begins to alternate between two aspects of Flora's life. To her own surprise, Flora lays an egg, experiencing maternal affection despite knowing that it is forbidden; this is followed later in the book by a second and then a third egg. One thread of the narrative therefore concerns Flora's efforts to bring an offspring to pupation. Flora tries to enable the birth of her first offspring by sneaking the egg into the nursery. This is found and destroyed by the fertility police, and Flora witnesses another bee being killed on suspicion of laying it. Learning to make beeswax to form a cradle, she finds a hidden place in which to lay her second egg, but it is destroyed when the hive's human cultivator intrudes at the end of the season to remove honeycomb.

Shortly after laying her first egg, Flora is required to become a forager due to the poor summer, the loss of foragers to pesticide, and her acquisition of Lily 500's data. The second thread of the narrative, then, concerns Flora's foraging expeditions. She is very successful and frequently shows other foragers how to find food by performing waggle dances. Flora's foraging expeditions see her fleeing crows, escaping a trap laid by wasps, colliding with a mobile phone mast, receiving prophetic wisdom from spiders, and exploring a conservatory.

As winter closes in, the sister bees, following the instructions of the Hive Mind, slaughter those drones that have not successfully mated outside the hive and then form a winter cluster. Flora discovers that the least obnoxious drone, Sir Linden, has survived the cull, injured, and enables him to hide in the cluster and survive. The cluster is briefly disturbed by the incursion of a mouse, which the bees kill and embalm in propolis.

As winter goes on, evidence that the Queen is seriously ill grows, and as spring begins Flora identifies that the Queen is a source of sickness in the hive. The fertility police have a Thistle execute the Queen, and the hive moves into a period of internal strife. Flora lays her third egg and this time successfully hides it and brings it to pupation. Sister Sage realises that Flora has given birth, but Flora kills her, disposing of the body with the help of Sir Linden.

As the disorder in the hive grows, several "princesses" (virgin queens) are born to different kin and begin to fight to the death. A Sage princess is winning, until Flora's child, who turns out also to be a princess, emerges and kills her, to become the new Queen. Immediately afterwards, the hive faces an unstoppable attack by wasps, and Flora helps her daughter lead the colony in a swarm; her daughter mates with Sir Linden; and they find a new home, in a hollow in a beech tree. Flora's life implicitly ends at this point.

== Scientific background ==
An author's note at the end of the novel indicates that Flora's reproduction is inspired by parthenogenetic reproduction in Apis mellifera scutellata worker bees. In an interview, Paull commented:

I found out about the 1 in 10,000 rarity of the sterile female worker, who will spontaneously begin forming eggs in her body, to the consternation of certain of her sisters, who even biologists refer to as "the fertility police". These real squads of bees will search for the laying worker, hunt her down and kill her, and eat her eggs. This is real biology, and really scary to imagine. And then there's the brutal phenomenon of how the princesses will seek each other out and fight to the death until only one is left alive to rule and be queen. Life behind those beehive walls is really stranger than anything I could imagine — so I just rushed to write the story. [...] I learned that being wild in your narrative means your story flounders. So I made the decision to stick to the truth of the organism, wherever I could. And that led me to the best story I could write, because it was steeled with fact.

== Reviews ==
Reviews were published, inter alia, in The New York Times, Daily Telegraph, Sunday Times, Locus, Daily Mail, The Guardian, The Times, Vogue, Tatler, Kirkus, Washington Post, and USA Today.
