= Laline Paull =

British novelist

Laline Paull FRSL
- Born: London, UK
- Education: Hertford College, Oxford
- Occupations: Novelist, writer
- Writing career
- Genre: Fantasy
- Notable works: The Bees (2014); Pod (2022)
- Website: www.lalinepaull.com

Laline Paull FRSL is a British novelist. Her debut novel, The Bees, was nominated for the 2015 Baileys Women's Prize for Fiction. Her 2017 cli-fi novel is titled The Ice. Her 2022 novel Pod was nominated for the 2023 Women's Prize for Fiction and made the shortlist.

== Biography ==
Laline Paull was born in London, UK. She is the daughter of Indian immigrants. She won a scholarship to the University of Oxford, graduating from Hertford College in 1983 with a Bachelor of Arts (BA) in English. She also took screenwriting and theatre courses in London and Los Angeles. Paull has cited Dorothea Brande's Becoming a Writer as an influence on her work, as well as Anna Sewell's Black Beauty, which called for animal welfare, a topic Paull frequently explores.

After years of screenwriting, Paull wrote her first novel, The Bees, in 2014. The novel, which she began writing shortly after the death of a beekeeper friend, was shortlisted for the 2015 Women's Prize for Fiction. Paull's 2022 novel Pod, about a bottlenose dolphin, was longlisted for the same prize in 2023.

In 2023, Paull was elected a Fellow of the Royal Society of Literature.

== Themes ==
The natural world and environmentalism are prominent themes in Paull's work. Paull has said that writing The Bees, which explores life in a honeybee colony, her research "whirled me into the all-too-real pollinator crisis...then forced me to confront the hyper-object that lay behind it: the climate crisis", which in turn led her to write the cli-fi novel The Ice. The Pod, which is about dolphins, was inspired by an incident Paull witnessed of tourists swimming with distressed wild dolphins; she later learned that these dolphins had been displaced by an oil spill. The novel depicts overfishing, ghost gear, and cetacean harvesting.

== Bibliography ==
- 2014 — The Bees
- 2017 — The Ice
- 2022 — Pod
