= Elizabeth McKenzie =

American author and editor (born 1958)

Elizabeth McKenzie is an American author and editor. Her work has been featured in The New Yorker, The Atlantic Monthly, Best American Nonrequired Reading. She has received a Pushcart Prize, and her work has been recorded for NPR’s Selected Shorts.

== Bibliography ==
=== Novels ===
- Stop That Girl (2005) nominated for The Story Prize.
- MacGregor Tells the World (2007) was named a San Francisco Chronicle, Chicago Tribune, and Library Journal's Best Book of the year.
- The Portable Veblen (2016) was longlisted for the National Book Award, won the California Book Award Silver Medal in Fiction, and was shortlisted for the Bayley's Women's Prize.
- The Dog of the North (2023).

=== Short fiction ===
Stories

Title	Year	First published	Reprinted/collected	Notes
Savage Breast	2014	"Savage Breast". The New Yorker. Vol. 90, no. 40. December 15, 2014. pp. 60–65.		

== Editorial career ==
McKenzie started as a staff editor at the Atlantic Monthly. She is managing editor and fiction editor for the Catamaran Literary Reader, and the senior editor of the Chicago Quarterly Review.
