= The Poisonwood Bible =

1998 novel by Barbara Kingsolver

- Author: Barbara Kingsolver
- Language: English
- Genre: Literary fiction Historical fiction
- Publisher: Harper
- Publication date: 1998
- Publication place: United States
- Media type: Print (hardback & paperback) and audio-CD
- Pages: 546 (hardcover), 543 (paperback)
- ISBN: 0-06-017540-0
- OCLC: 38916924
- Dewey Decimal: 813/.54 21
- LC Class: PS3561.I496 P65 1998

The Poisonwood Bible is a 1998 novel by Barbara Kingsolver, which tells the story of a missionary family, the Prices, who in 1959 move from the U.S. state of Georgia to the village of Kilanga in the Belgian Congo, close to the Kwilu River.

The novel's title refers to Bible errata. The father of the family creates his own "misprint" of the Bible. He concludes his sermons with the Kikongo expression "Tata Jesus is bängala" with the intent of saying "Jesus is most precious". In his hurried mispronunciation, he actually says "Jesus is poisonwood".

== Plot ==
Orleanna Price, the mother of the family, narrates the introductory chapter in five of the novel's seven sections. The narrative then alternates among the four daughters. The four girls increasingly mature and develop differently as each adapts to African village life and the political turmoil that overtakes the Belgian Congo in the 1960s.

The Price family packs up their belongings for their flight to the Congo, where they are going to spend a year as the family of a missionary. However, shortly before leaving, they are informed that they are limited to 44 pounds of luggage per person. The Southern Baptist Mission League suggests they solve this problem by leaving for the airport wearing many layers of clothing, hiding household items among the layers of clothes to lighten their luggage.

The Price daughters – Rachel, Leah, Adah and Ruth May – and their mother, Orleanna, and father, Nathan, attend their first church service in the village of Kilanga, and they realize how different their culture is from that of the Congo. For example, 14-year-old Leah helps her father plant a "demonstration garden"; it immediately receives criticism from Mama Tataba, whom the family has engaged as a live-in maid, and the garden does poorly due to the inappropriate climate. Nathan tries to hold an impromptu Easter celebration in hopes of baptizing numerous people, but he is unable to carry this out, as the river along the village, where he plans to hold the baptism, is infested with crocodiles.

Leah and her twin Adah begin to spy on Eeben Axelroot, the pilot who conveyed the family to Kilanga, and Nathan tries to convince Congolese men, one by one, to convert to Christianity. Meanwhile, five-year-old Ruth May befriends the village children. She finds out about Axelroot's business with the diamonds after breaking her arm.

After Mama Tataba departs, an orphan boy named Nelson becomes the family servant. Nathan and Leah go to Leopoldville (present day Kinshasa) to witness what is going on with the independence in the Congo. Methuselah (a parrot the Prices adopted from the previous missionary) dies, and Adah finds his feathers. Ruth May becomes very sick and lies in bed for the majority of the day. Leah begins to spend a lot of time with Anatole, Kilanga's teacher, discussing topics such as justice and the Congo. Leah wants to participate in the hunt, which upsets the village elders, as it would go against their custom, but she eventually is allowed to participate and even hunts an antelope.

The girls all gather together in the morning to check out the chicken coop. Inside they find footprints and a green mamba snake. A scream and gasp is heard from Ruth May, who has been bitten by the snake. The girls watch her turn cold and blue before she dies. Orleanna becomes filled with guilt over Ruth May's death, and takes the other children away, leaving her arrogant husband to fend for himself. With Anatole's help, they eventually reach safety.

The remaining Price sisters go through many different life changes: Adah dedicates herself to getting a scientific education back home (she is hemiplegic and wants to learn more about the condition); Leah marries Anatole and they start a family together; Rachel remains perceptive but vain and distrustful of men, goes through a string of marriages, and starts a business; and Nathan dies in his unsuccessful mission: killed by a mob of Kilanga's villagers when they blame him for a crocodile attack on a boat of children.

The story ends with a final chapter from Ruth May reflecting on her sisters and mother attempting to visit her grave, but not being able to find it, and a woman telling them a place named Kilanga never existed. She watches her sisters and her mother, and has seen how they have matured; she has matured as well. Through her death, she finally is able to understand the Congolese term muntu, which describes the concept of unity and how all life is connected in some way. She understands that she is muntu, and a part of all that is around her. Ruth May only wants her mother to understand the concept and for her to move on. She asks for her mother to forgive herself and not live with the guilt anymore.

== Major characters ==
The Prices

- Orleanna Price – Nathan's wife, and the mother of their four daughters. Born in Mississippi, she is deferential to her husband, but independent-minded.
- Nathan Price – Orleanna's husband. An evangelical (Southern Baptist) minister and a World War II veteran from Georgia, determined to "save Africa for Jesus". He feels guilt for having survived the war while his comrades died.
- Rachel Price (15 at start of the novel) – the oldest Price girl; blonde and self-centered, she is obsessed with her looks and American consumer culture.
- Leah Price (14 at start of the novel) – Adah's tomboyish twin; intelligent, self-confident, competitive, and tenacious. The most outspoken of the women, Leah is prone to dogmatism and concerned with her own salvation.
- Adah Price (14 at start of the novel) – Leah's twin, hemiplegic from birth. Silent, but witty, she is brilliant in math and languages, but is envious of her twin. She is also skeptical, sarcastic, envious, and prone to self-pity. She likes to think about things backwards as well as forwards, and is fond of palindromes.
- Ruth May Price (5 at the start of the novel) – the youngest Price girl; she is playful, independent, adventurous, perceptive, and inquisitive.

Other characters

- The Underdowns – Belgian mission chiefs who welcome and send supplies to the Prices.
- Eeben Axelroot – a corrupt Afrikaner mercenary pilot.
- Anatole Ngemba – the village teacher; an orphan, his fluency in English allows him to be an interpreter for Nathan's sermons.
- Brother Fowles – a New Yorker; the Prices' predecessor on the mission. Married to Céline, a local woman.
- Mama Tataba – a village woman, formerly employed by Fowles, who works for the Prices. Best known and celebrated for her prestigious quote, 'You got to be make hills'.
- Tata Ndu – the chief of Kilanga.
- Tata Kuvudundu – the spiritual leader of the village.
- Nelson – an orphaned village boy; he is Anatole's student who works for the Prices. He is forced to sleep outside in the chicken coop.
- Methuselah – a parrot left by Brother Fowles; it is excellent at imitating human speech.

== Reception and awards ==
Writing in The New York Times, Michiko Kakutani called the book "powerful", but said the social allegories were at times "heavy-handed".

John Mullan, reviewing the book in British newspaper The Guardian, said the book was "remarkable not just for its story, but also for its narrative form".

The Poisonwood Bible was selected for Oprah's Book Club in 1999. Also that year, the book was a finalist for the Pulitzer Prize in fiction. It won the 2000 Boeke Prize.

In March 2016, the book was discussed on BBC Radio 4's A Good Read.

== Adaptations ==
In March 2019, Bond Group Entertainment – a production company launched by actress Amy Adams and her manager Stacy O'Neil – secured a first-look deal with HBO to develop a TV adaptation of Kingsolver's novel. It was planned that Adams and O’Neil would executive produce the limited series, while Anya Epstein and Kingsolver would write the screenplay.

== See also ==
- Congo Crisis
- Congo River
- Democratic Republic of the Congo
- Patrice Lumumba
