= Fred & Edie =

2000 novel by Jill Dawson

- First edition (publ. Sceptre)
- Author: Jill Dawson
- Language: English
- Publisher: Sceptre
- Publication date: 2000
- ISBN: 0-340-75166-5 (first edition)
- Dewey Decimal: 823.914
- LC Class: PR6054.A923 F74

Fred & Edie is a 2000 epistolary and semi-biographical novel by Jill Dawson. The novel is loosely based on the murder of Percy Thompson by his with Edith Thompson and, her lover Frederick Bywaters. The novel develops a sympathetic reading of Edie's understanding of the crime and subsequent incarceration as depicted in her unsent letters to Fred.

The novel was shortlisted for both the 2000 Whitbread Novel Award and the 2001 Orange Prize for Fiction, though won neither.

== Reception ==
The novel was generally well received. New Zealand Herald reviewer John McCrystal, called the novel " a dazzling novel, gripping and moving." McCrystal called Edie's characterization as " a brilliant feat of characterisation" in contrast to Fred, "he never quite comes alive". In reflecting on Dawson' career, the British Council called " Dawson's version of this tragic story is haunting and compelling, particularly as Edie realises the terrible fate that awaits her." The Orange Prize nomination called the novel a "novel of entrancing imagination, sensitivity and grace" which "creates an intimate, tantalising voice for Edie".
