= Kirsten Bakis =

American novelist (born 1967)

- Born: 1967 (age 58–59); Switzerland
- Citizenship: United States
- Education: New York University
- Occupation: Novelist

Kirsten Bakis (born 1967, Switzerland) is an American novelist.

== Early life and education ==
Bakis was raised in Westchester County, New York, and graduated from New York University in 1990. She is a recipient of a Teaching/Writing Fellowship from the Iowa Writers' Workshop, a grant from the Michener/Copernicus Society of America.

== Career ==
She has taught at Hampshire College and was a writer-in-residence at Skidmore College in Saratoga Springs, New York in 2005.

She published her first novel, Lives of the Monster Dogs, in 1997. The novel was reissued twenty years later in 2017.

Bakis wrote a novel in 2004 out of financial need, though it was not published under her name.

Lives of the Monster Dogs received mostly positive reviews. Critics praised it for its originality, while also noting some of its drawbacks as science fiction. Following the 2017 reissue, Jeff VanderMeer of The Atlantic writes, "20 years later, as it gets a much-deserved reissue, Lives of the Monster Dogs feels undeniably like a classic." Tobias Carroll of Tor.com writes in 2017, "The novel opens with a nearly perfect first line: "In the years since the monster dogs were here with us, in New York, I’ve often been asked to write something about the time I spent with them."" Sharona Lin of Guernica writes in 2020, "It’s a wild and fantastical tale with all the hallmarks of a gothic classic: there’s a mad Prussian scientist, a secretive village, an existential crisis, a pondering of what it truly means to be human."

Bakis' second novel King Nyx was released in early 2024 to mixed review. The New York Times wrote, "Bakis summons her gift for atmospheric prose in a few memorable scenes, but otherwise 'King Nyx' feels flat." Published 27 years after her first novel, one commenter wrote that King Nyx felt semi-autobiographical of Bakis' life experiences due to the many similarities between her and the novel's main character Anna. In this interview, Bakis noted that the popular reception of Lives of Monster Dogs was overwhelming, and contributed to the long hiatus between book releases.

== Personal life ==
Bakis has lived with her two children, Theo and Charlotte, in Croton-on-Hudson since 2010.

== Awards and honors ==
=== Honors ===
- Teaching/Writing Fellowship from the Iowa Writers' Workshop
- New York Times Notable Book for the year, for Lives of the Monster Dogs

=== Literary ===
Year	Title	Award	Category	Result	Ref
1997	Lives of the Monster Dogs	Bram Stoker Award	First Novel	Won	
1998	Lives of the Monster Dogs	Orange Prize for Fiction	—	Shortlisted	
2004	—	Whiting Award	Fiction	Won	

== Works ==
=== Novels ===
- —— (1997). Lives of the Monster Dogs. Farrar, Straus & Giroux. ISBN 9780446674164.
- —— (2024). King Nyx. Liveright. ISBN 9781324093534.

=== Short fiction ===
- "The Thief". Tin House (65). Fall 2015.
