= Visible Worlds =

1998 novel by Marilyn Bowering

- Author: Marilyn Bowering
- Language: English
- Genre: Adventure fiction
- Publisher: HarperFlamingo
- Publication date: August 7, 1998
- Publication place: Canada
- Pages: 294
- ISBN: 978-0-06-019148-1

Visible Worlds is a novel by Canadian author Marilyn Bowering, published in 1998 by HarperFlamingo, an imprint of HarperCollins. An adventure story, the book was shortlisted for the 1999 Women's Prize for Fiction.

== Summary ==
The narrative follows a pair of twin brothers growing up in Winnipeg. The two are separated and forced to fight on opposite sides during World War II. The book also tells the story of Fika, a Russian explorer crossing an ice cap on a journey to Canada.

== Reception ==
Visible Worlds was generally well received by critics, including a starred review from Publishers Weekly, who praised the book's characters, highlighting how they're "steeped in the Canadian virtues of stamina and decency" and "prove so compelling that few would regard the overabundance of imagery or story lines as anything but a wealth of poetic reflection on tragedy and human endurance".

Kirkus Reviews described the novel as "a narrative high-wire act, as well as a subtle meditation on chance, luck, and inevitability—for all of which war offers the perfect if drastic laboratory".

Quill & Quire said Visible Worlds was a "gripping story" but criticised the novel's hasty ending.

== Awards ==
In 1998, Visible Worlds won the Ethel Wilson Fiction Prize. The following year, it was shortlisted for the Women's Prize for Fiction.
