= Jill Dawson =

English poet and novelist

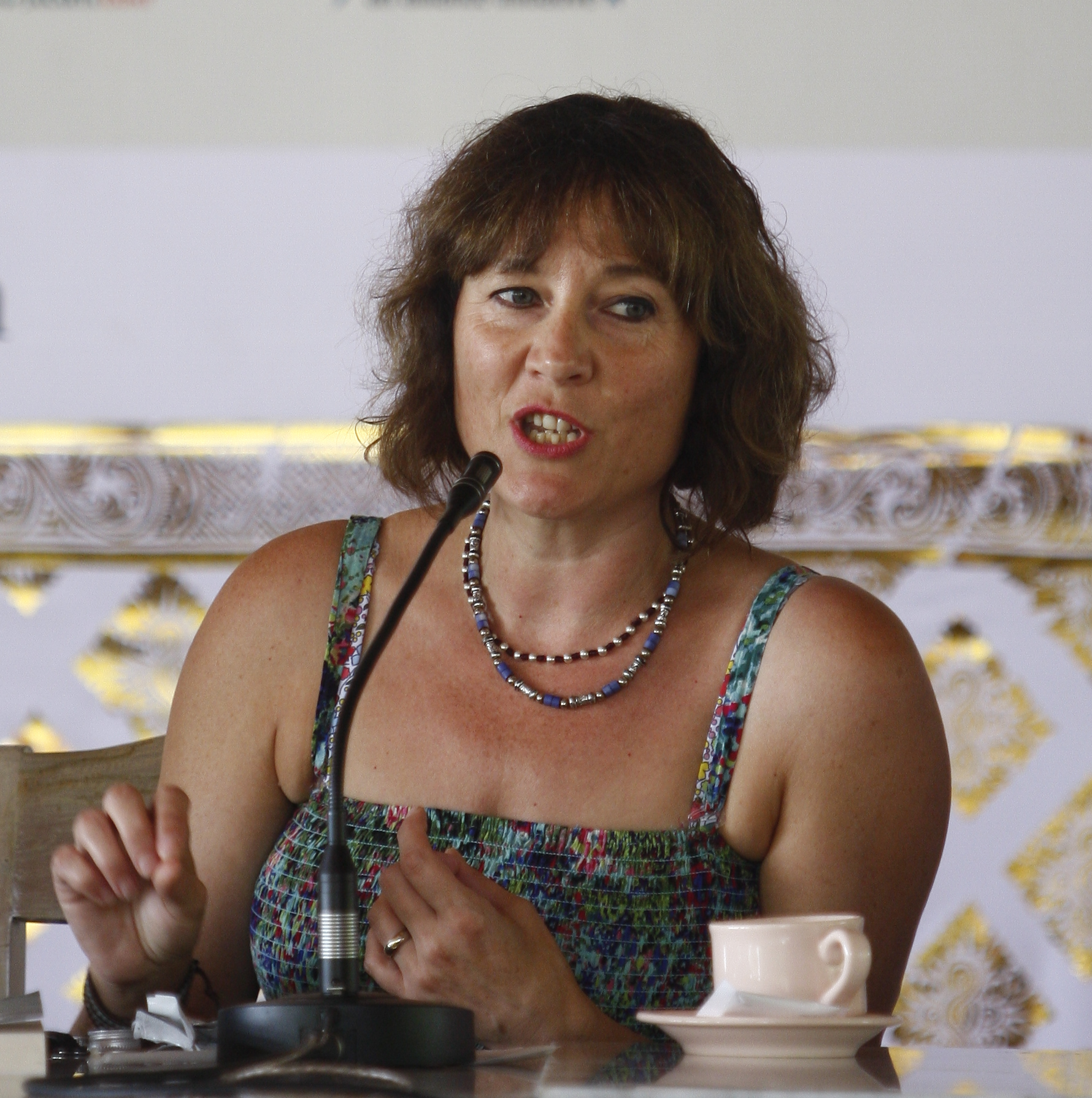
Jill Dawson on Ubud Writers & Readers Festival 2012

Jill Dawson (born 8 April 1962) is an English poet and novelist who grew up in Durham, England. She began publishing her poems in pamphlets and small magazines. Her first book, Trick of the Light, was published in 1996. She was the British Council Writing Fellow at Amherst College for 1997. She was elected a Fellow of the Royal Society of Literature in 2020. She lives in the Fens of Cambridgeshire.

== Bibliography ==
- School Tales: Stories by Young Women (editor), Women's Press, 1990, ISBN 978-0-7043-4922-3
- The Virago Book of Wicked Verse (editor), Virago Press, 1992, ISBN 978-1-85381-387-0
- White Fish with Painted Nails, Slow Dancer Press, 1990; Slow Dancer Press, 1994, ISBN 978-1-871033-26-7
- How Do I Look?, Virago Press, 1990, ISBN 9781853812224
- The Virago Book of Love Letters (editor), Virago Press, 1994, ISBN 978-1-85381-723-6
- Kisses on Paper, Faber and Faber, 1994, ISBN 978-0-571-19864-1
- Trick of the Light, Sceptre, 1997, ISBN 978-0-340-65383-8
- Magpie, Sceptre, 1998, ISBN 978-0-340-65384-5
- Wild Ways: New Stories about Women on the Road (editor with Margo Daly), Hodder & Stoughton, 1998, ISBN 978-0-340-69516-6
- Fred and Edie, Sceptre, 2000; Houghton Mifflin Harcourt, 2002, ISBN 978-0-618-19728-6
- Gas and Air: Tales of Pregnancy and Birth (editor with Margo Daly), Bloomsbury Publishing, 2002
- Wild Boy, Sceptre, 2003, ISBN 978-0-340-82296-8
- Watch Me Disappear, Sceptre, 2006, ISBN 978-0-340-82298-2
- The Great Lover Sceptre, 2009, ISBN 978-0-340-93565-1; HarperCollins, 2010, ISBN 978-0-06-192436-1
- Lucky Bunny, Sceptre, 2011, ISBN 978-0-340-93567-5
- The Crime Writer, Sceptre, 2016, ISBN 978-1444731118
- The Language of Birds, Sceptre, 2019, ISBN 978-1473654525
- The Bewitching, Sceptre, 2022, ISBN 978-1473654662

== Awards ==
Awards which Dawson has received recognition from include:

- 1984 First prize in City Limits short story competition
- 1984 First Prize in Hackney New Writers Competition (judged by Michelene Wandor)
- 1992 Eric Gregory Award for poetry
- 1995 Joint first prize Sheffield Hallam short story competition (judged by Margaret Drabble and Hanif Kureishi)
- 1995 Blue Nose Poet of the Year
- 1995 Author's Fund Award
- 1996 Kathleen Blundell Award
- 1996 London Arts Board New Writer Award for Magpie
- 2000 Short list for Whitbread Novel of the Year for Fred & Edie
- 2001 Short list for Orange Prize for Fred & Edie
- 2001 Long-list of Dublin IMPAC Award for Fred & Edie
- 2001 ScreenEast Award for Stunner screenplay.
- 2003 Arts Council England Award for Half of England (Watch Me Disappear)
- 2004 Wild Boy becomes the first ever novel to be long-listed for the British Academy Book Prize
- 2006 ScreenEast award for Watch Me Disappear screenplay.
- 2006 Watch Me Disappear long-listed for the Orange Prize
- 2006 Arts Council Award
- 2008 Arts Council Award for The Silver Banks
- 2016 East Anglian Book of the Year (Fiction) for The Crime Writer
