= The Lacuna =

2009 novel by Barbara Kingsolver

- First edition
- Author: Barbara Kingsolver
- Language: English
- Publisher: HarperCollins
- Publication date: 2009
- Publication place: United States
- ISBN: 978-0-06-085258-0
- OCLC: 313656952

The Lacuna is a 2009 novel by Barbara Kingsolver. It is Kingsolver's sixth novel, and won the 2010 Orange Prize for Fiction and the Library of Virginia Literary Award. It was shortlisted for the 2011 International Dublin Literary Award. Kingsolver won the 2010 Women's Prize for Fiction for the novel.

== Plot ==
The novel tells the story of Harrison William Shepherd beginning with his childhood in Mexico during the 1930s. His parents are separated so he lives back and forth between the United States with his father and Mexico with his mother. During his time in Mexico he works as a plaster mixer for the mural artist Diego Rivera then as a cook for both him and his artist wife Frida Kahlo, with whom Shepherd develops a lifelong friendship. While living with and working for them, he also begins working as a secretary for Leon Trotsky who is hiding there, exiled by Stalin, and witnesses his assassination.

He accompanies some of Kahlo's paintings to Washington DC where he witnesses the shootings of the Bonus Army. He then moves to Asheville, North Carolina, where he writes successful historical novels set in Mexico. However he is investigated by the House Un-American Activities Committee, and after he is vilified by the press he returns to Mexico, taking his secretary, Violet Brown, with him. He disappears while swimming off the Pacific coast and is presumed dead. However Brown, the chief beneficiary of his will, later receives a letter from Kahlo hinting that he has survived, by swimming underwater along a lava tube which emerges inland in a cenote.

He had instructed Brown to burn his diaries and letterspapers, but she secretly saves them and it is these papers that form the bulk of the novel. There are gaps, or lacunae, in the story, hence the title.
