= Pomponia Graecina =

1st century AD Roman noblewoman

Pomponia Graecina (d. 83 AD) was a noble Roman woman of the first century who was related to the Julio-Claudian dynasty. She was the wife of Aulus Plautius, the general who led the Roman conquest of Britain in 43 AD, and was renowned as one of the few people who dared to publicly mourn the death of a kinswoman (Julia Livia, granddaughter of emperor Tiberius) killed by the Imperial family. It has been speculated that she was an early Christian. She is identified by some as Saint Lucina or Lucy, honoured by the Roman Catholic Church, who would have buried the bodies of martyrs Martinian and Processus.

== Family background ==
Pomponia's background is not certain, but can be reconstructed as follows. Her father was probably Gaius Pomponius Graecinus, who was suffect consul in 16 AD and a correspondent of Ovid. Graecinus' wife was Asinia, sister of Gaius Asinius Pollio, and through her Pomponia was related to the Imperial family.

Asinia's father, Gaius Asinius Gallus, was consul in 8 BC, and her mother Vipsania, was the daughter of the general and politician Marcus Vipsanius Agrippa. By her former husband, the future emperor Tiberius, Vipsania was also the mother of Drusus the Younger. Vipsania's half-siblings, from her father's marriage to Augustus' daughter Julia, included Agrippina the Elder, mother of the emperor Caligula and Agrippina the Younger, who was the mother of Nero and wife of Claudius.

Other notable ancestors on her mother's side include the historian and senator Gaius Asinius Pollio, who was consul in 40 BC.

== Biography ==
Pomponia married Aulus Plautius (d. by 65 AD), the senator and general who led the Roman conquest of Britain in 43 AD, for which he later received a military ovation, and who governed Roman Britain until 47 AD. A younger Aulus Plautius, probably their son, was murdered by the emperor Nero, supposedly because Nero's mother Agrippina had fallen in love with him and encouraged him to bid for the throne.

In 43 AD Pomponia's relative Julia Livia, daughter of her uncle Drusus Julius Caesar, was executed on the orders of her maternal uncle, the emperor Claudius at the instigation of the empress Valeria Messalina. Pomponia spent the next forty years in open mourning in defiance of successive emperors. She escaped punishment for this, possibly as a result of her own illustrious ancestry and her husband's sterling military reputation, which gave her prestige. According to Tacitus, Pomponia lived a long, unhappy life, possibly as a result of her son's murder and the deaths of several relatives associated with the Imperial family. In 57 AD Pomponia was charged with practising a "foreign superstition", which has been taken by some to mean conversion to Christianity, although there were other regulated cults in ancient Rome. According to ancient Roman tradition, she was tried by her husband before her kinsmen, and acquitted. She died in 83 AD.

Inscriptions in the catacombs of Saint Callistus in Rome suggest that later members of Pomponia's family were indeed Christians. The archaeologist Battista de Rossi controversially identifies her with Saint Lucina, the purported donor of the part of the catacombs where the inscriptions were found, and suggests that Lucina was Pomponia's baptismal name. Saint Lucina is honoured by the Roman Catholic Church on 30 June. She is said to have visited the martyrs Martinian and Processus, the two former guards at the Mamertine Prison who had been converted in prison by their prisoner Saint Peter, and buried their bodies after their execution.

== Fictional depictions ==
Pomponia Graecina and her husband Aulus Plautius are informal adoptive parents of Ligia, the heroine of Henryk Sienkiewicz's 1895 historical novel Quo Vadis. The novel presents both Pomponia and her adoptive daughter as secret Christians, something that Plautius either does not know or chooses to ignore. In the 1951 film adaptation she was played by Nora Swinburne. In the 2001 Polish-language film adaptation, Pomponia was played by actress Danuta Stenka.

Pomponia is portrayed in When the Eagle Hunts, a historical fiction novel from the Eagle Series by Simon Scarrow. In the story, Pomponia and her two children are captured and held hostage by Druids resisting the Roman invasion of Britain, while a rescue is attempted by the series' two main characters.

Giovanni Pascoli's poem Pomponia Graecina won him the gold medal at the Certamen Hoeufftianum in 1910.

She also makes an appearance in David Wishart's Family Commitments, part of the Marcus Corvinus series.
