= The Eagle in the Sand =

2006 novel by Simon Scarrow

- First UK edition cover
- Author: Simon Scarrow
- Language: English
- Series: Eagles of the Empire
- Genre: Historical novel
- Publisher: Headline (UK)
- Publication date: 2006
- Publication place: United Kingdom
- Media type: Print (Hardback & Paperback)
- ISBN: 978-0-7553-2774-4
- Preceded by: The Eagle's Prophecy
- Followed by: Centurion

The Eagle in the Sand is a novel written by Simon Scarrow, published by Headline Book Publishing in 2006 (and published in the US as The Zealot in 2014). It is the seventh book in the Eagles of the Empire series, starting with Macro and Cato's transfer to the eastern provinces of Rome.

== Summary ==
Trouble is brewing on the eastern frontier of the Roman Empire. The troops are in deplorable state, while the corrupt behaviour of their senior officers threatens to undermine the army's control of the region. To restore the competence of the men defending a vital fort, two experienced centurions are dispatched to Judea from Rome.

On their arrival Macro and Cato discover that there is an even more serious problem to deal with. Bannus, a local tribesman, is brewing up rebellion amongst the followers of Jehoshua, who was crucified in Jerusalem some seventeen years earlier. Now Bannus is pushing the faction towards violent opposition to Rome.

As the local revolt grows in scale, Rome's long-standing enemy Parthia is poised to invade. Macro and Cato must stamp out corruption in the cohort and restore it to fighting fitness to quash Bannus - before the eastern provinces are lost to the Empire for ever...

== Characters ==
- Lucius Cornelius Macro (Centurion of the Second Illyrian)
- Quintus Licinius Cato (Centurion of the Second Illyrian)
- Scrofa (Prefect of the Second Illyrian)
- Gaius Larius Postumus (Centurion of the Second Illyrian)
- Parmenion (Centurion of the Second Illyrian)
- Proximus (Decurion of the Second Illyrian)
- Quintatus (Decurion of the Second Illyrian)
- Cassius Longinus (Governor of Syria)
- Florianus (Centurion)
- Tiberius Julius Alexander (Procurator of Syria)
- Narcissus (Imperial Secretary of Rome)
- Symeon ben Jonas (Judean Guide)
- Murad (Symeon's adopted son)
- Bannus (Rebel Leader)
- Miriam (Mother of Jehoshua, a crucified pacifist)
- Yusef (Jehoshua's son)
- Silas of Antioch (Caravan leader)
