= Centurion (novel) =

2007 novel by Simon Scarrow

- UK first edition cover
- Author: Simon Scarrow
- Language: English
- Series: Eagles of the Empire
- Genre: Historical novel
- Publisher: Headline (UK)
- Publication date: 2007
- Publication place: United Kingdom
- Media type: Print (hardback & paperback)
- ISBN: 978-0-7553-8022-0
- Preceded by: The Eagle in the Sand
- Followed by: Gladiator

Centurion is a historical fiction novel (ISBN 0755327764) written by Simon Scarrow, published by Headline Book Publishing in 2007. It is book 8 in the Eagles of the Empire series, continuing Macro and Cato's adventures in the eastern provinces of the Roman Empire that began in The Eagle in the Sand.

== Summary ==
During the 1st century AD, a force of the Parthian Empire destroys a vexillation of a Roman auxiliary cohort sent to construct a fort on the banks of the Euphrates in the Kingdom of Palmyra. The garrison is slaughtered. Meanwhile, with tensions rising between Rome and Parthia, the Legio X Fretensis, Legio III Gallica and the Legio VI Ferrata are drilling for war in Syria. Prefect Macro and Centurion Cato are drilling the Second Illyrian, an auxiliary cohort, attached to the Legio X Fretensis for the looming war.

Cato and Macro were sent to Syria by Narcissus to gather proof that the governor of Syria, Longinus was planning to use the Syrian legions to usurp the Emperor Claudius. During their time in Antioch, Crispus, a Roman legionary, murders an auxiliary leading to Crispus' execution, much to the chagrin of the legionaries. A Parthian convoy arrives, delivering the head of Centurion Castor, the soldier who commanded the Euphrates fort, and warns of Parthian intervention, should Rome continue to be seen to be annexing Palmyra. Shortly thereafter, a Roman soldier arrives at the behest of Lucius Sempronius, a Roman ambassador to Palmyra, informing Longinus that Palmyra has descended into civil war.

Artaxes, the son of Palmyran king Vabathus, has raised an army and laid siege to the Palmyran loyalists in the Royal Citadel. Fearing the Parthians will arrive before the Romans can, Longinus sends the Second Illyrian and a cohort of the Legio X Fretensis to reinforce the loyalists. Along the way, the Roman force is aided by Prince Balthus, who covets the Palmyran throne, despite not being Vabathus' first born. The Romans and Balthus' men fight their way through to the city and manage to reinforce the loyalist troops, mainly composed of Greek mercenaries. Following a banquet to celebrate the successful defence of a rebel assault, Amethus, one of Vabathus' sons is found murdered, with Balthus being the prime suspect. Meanwhile, Cato meets Sempronius' daughter, Julia, and the two fall in love after an uneasy start.

After a rebel bombardment, the loyalist food stores are all but destroyed. Cato attempts to bluff Artaxes into standing down, however before Artaxes can respond, Longinus arrives with two legions and several auxiliary units. Longinus privately reveals to Cato and Macro that they were never meant to reach Palmyra, and were meant to die in the desert, removing Narcissus' spies that had frustrated his plans. Against the advice of Cato, Longinus leads the legions into the desert, determined to destroy Artaxes and his Parthian allies. During a night attack, Longinus panics, orders a retreat and leaves the army at the mercy of the Parthian horsemen. On the suggestions of Cato, the army manages to trap the Parthians, destroying their army. Balthus orders his brother, Artaxes, killed, leaving him the sole heir to Vabathus' throne.

Back in Palmyra, it is revealed Balthus had ordered his slave, Carpex, to murder Amethus. Balthus is arrested to be put to death. With no heir to succeed the king, Sempronius reveals that the empire will annex Palmyra and absorb it into the province of Syria. Macro and Cato are released from Narcissus' employment, ending their posting in the East. Sempronius later gives Cato his consent to marry his daughter, Julia.

== Main characters ==
=== Romans ===
- Centurion Quintus Lucinius Cato - Temporarily promoted to Acting Prefect of the Second Illyrian Cohort, Macro's adjutant
- Prefect Lucinius Cornelius Macro - Prefect of the Second Illyrian Cohort
- Legate Gallus Amatius - Commanding officer of the Tenth legion
- Centurion Parmenion - Centurion of the Second Illyrian, serves as Cato's adjutant
- Centurion Castor - Centurion of the Tenth legion, killed in action when the Parthians destroy his fort
- Centurion Horatius - Centurion of the Tenth legion
- Centurion Braccus - Centurion of the Tenth legion
- Centurion Septimus - Centurion of the Tenth legion
- Centurion Porcius Cimber - Centurion of the Tenth legion
- Optio Marcus Metellus Crispus - Optio of the Tenth legion, he is put to death for murdering an auxiliary.
- Centurion Metellus - Centurion of the Second Illyrian
- Centurion Aquila - Centurion of the Second Illyrian, commander of the cohort's cavalry contingent
- Caius Menathus - Cavalryman of the Second Illyrian
- Gaius Cassius Longinus - Governor of Syria
- Lucius Sempronius - Roman ambassador, sent to Palmyra to conclude a treaty
- Julia Sempronia - Sempronius' daughter-turned-surgeon, who falls in love with Cato

=== Palmyrans ===
- King Vabathus - Sovereign of Palmyra
- Prince Amethus - First son of Vabathus. He is assassinated by Carpex, under orders from Balthus.
- Prince Balthus - Second son of Vabathus, ruthlessly coveting his father's throne. He is later put to death by Vabathus for treason.
- Prince Artaxes - Third son of Vabathus, and his favourite son. He leads the rebels against his father, and is later killed on Balthus' orders in battle.
- Thermon - The King's Chamberlain and younger brother. He was castrated under orders from the King to prevent any competition in the royal lineage.
- Krathos - A Palmyran minister who uses the easily persuaded Amethus to further his own agendas
- Demetrius - Commander of the Royal Guard
- Archaelaus - Tetrach of the Second Syntagma of the Royal Guard
- Carpex - A slave of Balthus who assassinates Amethus on his orders. Carpex is later murdered by Balthus once he exposes the prince.
- Jesmiah - A Palmyran civilian who cares for her baby brother, Ayshel

=== Parthians ===
- Metaxes - Prince and heir to the throne of Parthia, sent to warn Longinus of Parthian intervention

== Notes ==
After Eagle in the Sand, Headline Book Publishing reportedly decided not to use titles with the word "Eagle" anymore, to attract new fans.

== Reviews ==
- Review in the Coventry Telegraph, April 21 2008. Reviewed by Ted Jury
- Review at Yorkshire Evening Post, 22 March 2008. Reviewed by RC
- Review by Jill Murphy at The Bookbag
- Review at FantasticFiction.co.uk
