= Wilbur Smith Adventure Writing Prize =

- Awarded for: adventure fiction novels
- Country: United Kingdom
- Presented by: Wilbur and Niso Smith Foundation
- First award: 2016; 10 years ago
- Website: www.wilbur-niso-smithfoundation.org/index.php/prize/intro

The Wilbur Smith Adventure Writing Prize is a literary prize established by the Wilbur and Niso Smith Foundation in 2016. The main £10,000 Published Novel accolade is given to an English-language adventure fiction novel by an author of any nationality.

The prize also launched the following categories: Unpublished Manuscript, Author of Tomorrow, and New Voices.

== Main prize recipients ==
=== 2010s ===
Year	Author	Work	Result	Ref.
2016
2016	Corban Addison	The Tears of Dark Water	Winner	
2016	Roger Hobbs	Vanishing Games	Shortlist	
2016	Ben Kane	Eagles at War	Shortlist	
2016	Andy McDermott	The Revelation Code	Shortlist	
2016	Simon Scarrow	Britannia	Shortlist	
2016	Manda Scott	Into the Fire	Shortlist	
2017
2017	Stef Penney	Under a Pole Star	Winner	
2017	Frank Gardner	Crisis	Shortlist	
2017	David Gilman	The Last Horseman	Shortlist	
2017	Graham Hurley	Finisterre	Shortlist	
2017	Sara Sheridan	On Starlit Seas	Shortlist	
2017	James Swallow	Nomad	Shortlist	
2018
2018	Abir Mukherjee	A Necessary Evil	Winner	
2018	Rory Clements	Nucleus	Shortlist	
2018	Jane Harris	Sugar Money	Shortlist	
2018	Tyler Keevil	No Good Brother	Shortlist	
2018	Maggie Ritchie	Looking for Evelyn	Shortlist	
2018	James Wilde	Pendragon	Shortlist	
2019
2019	Henry Porter	Firefly	Winner	
2019	J.D. Fennell	Sleeper: The Red Storm	Shortlist	
2019	Zeyn Joukhadar	The Map of Salt and Stars	Shortlist	
2019	Craig Russell	The Devil Aspect	Shortlist	
2019	Jock Serong	Preservation	Shortlist	
2019	Holly Watt	To the Lions	Shortlist	

=== 2020s ===
Year	Author	Work	Result	Ref.
2021
2021	Rachel Joyce	Miss Benson's Beetle	Winner	
2021	Ayesha Harruna Attah	The Deep Blue Between	Shortlist	
2021	D. V. Bishop	City of Vengeance	Shortlist	
2021	Niall Edworthy	Otto Eckhart's Ordeal	Shortlist	
2021	Alex Shaw	Total Blackout	Shortlist	
2021	James Swallow	Rogue	Shortlist	
2022
2022	Giles Kristian	Where Blood Runs Cold	Winner	
2022	Chris Hadfield	The Apollo Murders	Shortlist	
2022	John Marrs	The Vacation	Shortlist	
2022	T.L. Mogford	The Plant Hunter	Shortlist	
2022	Chibundu Onuzo	Sankofa	Shortlist	
2022	Lizzie Pook	Moonlight and the Pearler's Daughter	Shortlist	
2023
2023	Emma Styles	No Country for Girls	Winner	
2023	Paddy Crewe	My Name is Yip	Shortlist	
2023	Anthony McCarten	Going Zero	Shortlist	
2023	Priscilla Morris	Black Butterflies	Shortlist	
2023	Natasha Pulley	The Half Life of Valerie K	Shortlist	
2023	Jenny Tinghui Zhang	Four Treasures of the Sky	Shortlist	
2024
2024	Francesca de Tores	Saltblood	Winner	
2024	Louis de Bernières	Light Over Liskeard	Shortlist	
2024	Chukwuebuka Ibeh	Blessings	Shortlist	
2024	C. E. McGill	Our Hideous Progeny	Shortlist	
2024	Derek B. Miller	The Curse of Houdini	Shortlist	
2024	Leo Vardiashvili	Hard by a Great Forest	Shortlist	
2025
2025	Costanza Casati	Babylonia	Winner	
2025	Nydia Hetherington	Sycorax	Shortlist	
2025	Jack Jordan	Redemption	Shortlist	
2025	Diana McCaulay	A House for Miss Pauline	Shortlist	
2025	Samantha Sotto Yambao	Water Moon	Shortlist	
2025	Nussaibah Younis	Fundamentally	Shortlist	
2026
2026	Ruthvika Rao	The Fertile Earth	Winner	
2026	Anya Bergman	The Tarot Reader of Versailles	Shortlist	
2026	Elodie Harper	Boudicca's Daughter	Shortlist	
2026	Adam Oyebanji	Esperance	Shortlist	
2026	Clare Whitfield	Poor Girls	Shortlist	
2026	Harry Whitehead	White Road	Shortlist	
