= Young Bloods (novel) =

2006 book by Simon Scarrow

- Author: Simon Scarrow
- Cover artist: Tim Byrne
- Language: English
- Series: Wellington and Napoleon Quartet
- Genre: Historical novel
- Published: 2006 (Hodder Headline)
- Publication place: United Kingdom
- Media type: Print (Hardback)
- Pages: 504 pp
- ISBN: 0-7553-2433-1
- OCLC: 64555388
- Followed by: The Generals

Young Bloods is the first volume in Simon Scarrow's Wellington and Napoleon Quartet, which narrates mostly in alternate chapters, the story of a young Anglo-Irish nobleman Arthur Wellesley and the Corsican cadet Napoleone Buonaparte.

== Plot ==
The book begins with the birth of both men in 1769 - Arthur as a weak and puny baby, a third son, to a wealthy Anglo-Irish Protestant couple; Napoleone as a healthy second son to a Corsican couple fighting the French for independence.

The story continues with the training of both youths as cadet officers, both encountering social and other difficulties thanks to their birth outside the mainland. Arthur's innate conservatism forms as a result of the Gordon riots and his realization that his Anglo-Irish Protestant lifestyle is dependent on maintaining the status quo. Napoleone, on the other hand, is even more of an outsider, a Corsican among Frenchmen, a quasi-noble among pre-revolutionary noblemen, and an impoverished young cadet among those with money to burn.

Interestingly, both men are depicted as having a brief encounter with each other in the years prior to the French Revolution wherein Wellesley is sent to observe a demonstration that Napoleone's regiment is participating in. Such an encounter did not happen in actuality, though Wellesley, fluent in French, was sent to France on several occasions in his youth as an observer.

The story ends approximately in 1796, with Arthur having been turned down by the family of his inamorata Kitty Pakenham because of his lack of prospects, and Napoleone, now called Napoleon Bonaparte, mounting a successful attack on Toulon.
