= Fire and Sword (novel) =

2009 novel by Simon Scarrow

- First edition
- Author: Simon Scarrow
- Cover artist: Tim Byrne
- Language: English
- Series: Wellington and Napoleon Quartet
- Genre: Historical novel
- Publisher: Headline Review
- Publication date: 2009
- Publication place: United Kingdom
- Media type: Print (Hardback)
- Pages: 657 pp
- ISBN: 978-0-7553-2438-5
- Preceded by: The Generals
- Followed by: The Fields of Death

Fire and Sword is the third book in Simon Scarrow's Wellington and Napoleon Quartet, which tells the story of the French Revolution and the Napoleonic Wars from the point of view of Arthur Wellesley (the future Duke of Wellington), and Napoleon Bonaparte. It was first published in 2009 by Headline Review.

== Plot ==
The book covers the time period between December 1804 and April 1809. At the start of the novel, Napoleon has recently been crowned Emperor of France, while Arthur has returned from his successful campaigns in India. The plot of the novel revolves around Napoleon's wars in central Europe, and plans for the invasion of England, foiled by the Battle of Trafalgar. Running parallel to this story, Arthur Wellesley is making a name for himself in the armies of Britain, commanding a unit of the army sent to deprive Napoleon of the Danish navy, and in the first expeditionary force sent to liberate Portugal from French rule. At the end of the novel, Napoleon's position is becoming more tenuous, with plots being hatched against him, while Arthur has begun to inflict the first defeats on the armies of Napoleon in the Iberian Peninsula.
