= The Eagle's Prey =

2004 novel by Simon Scarrow

- First UK edition cover
- Author: Simon Scarrow
- Language: English
- Series: Eagles of the Empire
- Genre: Historical novel
- Publisher: Headline (UK) & Thomas Dunne Books (USA)
- Publication date: 5 July 2004
- Publication place: United Kingdom
- Media type: Print (Hardback & Paperback)
- Pages: 480 p. (paperback edition)
- ISBN: 0-7553-0116-1
- OCLC: 58053216
- Preceded by: The Eagle and the Wolves
- Followed by: The Eagle's Prophecy

The Eagle's Prey is the fifth novel in the Eagles of the Empire series by Simon Scarrow. It was published by Headline Publishing Group in July 2004.

== Synopsis ==
This novel is set in AD 44 during the Roman invasion of Britain.

During the second year of their campaign against the British tribes, the Roman legions are under great pressure to complete their mission. However, at a crucial juncture in battle, Macro and Cato's superior, Centurion Maximius, loses his nerve after discovering an auxiliary outpost had been massacred by British raiders and leads his cohort on a revenge mission, in spite of his orders to defend a vital river crossing. Macro questions Maximius' orders, and is allowed by his superior to take his century and guard the river crossing.

Maximius gets his revenge, but is alerted to the danger of Macro's century and rushes back to the aid of his junior centurion. However, they are too late, and the cohort is driven in to a tactical retreat to avoid obliteration. This allows the Britons, including the enemy leader Caratacus, to escape. Because of this failure to halt the escape of Caratacus' army, and the subsequent delay of Claudius' triumph at Rome, an inquest, overseen by General Plautius and Narcissus, leads to the decimation of the cohort.

Cato and his fellow convicts escape their punishment and are forced to wander the British countryside, looking for a safe place to hide from their enemies, both Roman and Briton. By a twist of fate Cato finds himself in the hands of Caratacus, and gets to know him and his cause.
