= An Offer You Can't Refuse =

An Offer You Can't Refuse may refer to:

- An Offer You Can't Refuse (album), an album by A Change of Pace
- Offer You Can't Refuse, an EP by Kool G Rap
- An Offer You Can't Refuse (novel), a novel by Jill Mansell
