= Under the Eagle =

2000 novel by Simon Scarrow

- UK First edition cover
- Author: Simon Scarrow
- Language: English
- Series: Eagles of the Empire
- Genre: Historical novel
- Publisher: Headline (UK) & Thomas Dunne Books (USA)
- Publication date: 6 July 2000
- Publication place: United Kingdom
- Media type: Print (Hardback & Paperback)
- Pages: 256 pp (hardback edition) & 448 p. (paperback edition)
- ISBN: 0-7472-7282-4 (hardback edition) & ISBN 0-7472-6629-8 (paperback edition)
- OCLC: 43581022
- Followed by: The Eagle's Conquest

Under the Eagle is the first book in the Eagles of the Empire series, by Simon Scarrow and is his debut novel, introducing the characters of Quintus Licinius Cato and Lucius Cornelius Macro. It was published in 2000.

== Plot summary ==
=== Prologue ===
55 BC: During the first Roman invasion of Britain, a group of legionaries lose the army's pay chest in a marsh while retreating to their ships. Harried by the British tribes, they can only mark the location of the marsh, while their commander, Julius Caesar, swears to return one day.

=== Part One ===
AD 43: On the Rhine frontier in Germania, a new draft of recruits arrive at the base of the Second Legion. One young recruit, Cato, bears a letter from Emperor Claudius appointing him to the rank of Centurion, however, since Cato is barely seventeen, the Legion's commander, Vespasian, proposes a compromise by appointing him optio, the centurion's second-in-command. The letter also contains another message, written in code, warning the legate that someone on his staff has been implicated in Scribonianus's failed coup attempt, and the Emperor has sent an unnamed Imperial agent to identify the person.

Cato, the son of a freed slave at the Imperial Palace, is unused to the harsh life of a Roman Legion, and is resented by his fellow recruits for being promoted ahead of them. He sticks through basic training through determination, earning Centurion Macro's grudging approval.

When a Roman tax collector is mutilated by the chief of a local German town, Vespasian sends the Third Cohort, under tribune Vitellius, which includes Macro's Sixth Century. Because Macro's regular optio is laid up by an injury, he conscripts Cato to replace him. No one is expecting any trouble, but once the Cohort is inside the village, they are ambushed by a much larger force of Germans hiding in the woods. The Cohort barricades itself behind the village's walls, with no option except to hold out until they are reported overdue at the base and Vespasian arrives with reinforcements.

At Cato's suggestion, the embattled legionaries set fire to the attacking Germans' rudimentary battering ram, but the flames unfortunately spread to the gate, then the rest of the village, forcing the century to fall back from the walls. Whilst in retreat to the main village square, Macro and Cato are cut off from their comrades and the former is hit by a javelin. Ignoring Macro's command to leave him behind, Cato charges alone at the attacking Germans, driving them away with the Century's Standard (Vexillum), long enough to help Macro to his feet and drag him into a nearby building. With a combination of guile, improvisation, and sheer bravery, Cato manages to get himself, Macro and the standard through the fire and back to the Roman lines. The Germans fall back when Vespasian arrives unexpectedly early, leading reinforcements. Macro later nominates Cato for a Grass Crown, and, to their shared embarrassment, both are invited to dine at Vespasian's house after the Cohort returns to base.

Whilst recovering from his wounds, Macro asks Cato to teach him to read and write; all centurions are required to process paperwork, but Macro has, until then, been concealing his illiteracy by delegating his work to a wizened clerk, Piso.

The Legion soon receives new orders, to march into Gaul to join the force mustering for Claudius's invasion of Britain.

=== Part Two ===
While en route to the invasion force's muster point at Gesoriacum, Macro and Cato's century is detailed to escort Imperial Secretary Narcissus, but they are attacked on the road by a group of Syrian mercenaries intending to kill Narcissus. Fighting them off, the convoy successfully reaches Gesoriacum.

While trying to sneak into Vespasian's tent to meet Lavinia, Cato surprises a thief in the act of trying to burgle the legate's safe; the thief attacks Cato and receives a near-fatal wound, and gets away with a private message from Narcissus to Vespasian. Cato is unable to say anything without revealing that he was there and being suspected of the theft himself.

When the legionaries refuse to invade Britannia, Narcissus deals with the problem. On the one hand, he stages a comic performance in Gesoriacum's amphitheatre, pretending to challenge the legionaries to a fight, and provoking amused cries of "Io Saturnalia!" (a Roman festival when slaves and masters switch places for the day). On the other, he has the ringleaders secretly rounded up and executed. With the mutiny suppressed, the invasion is ready to proceed.

In private conference with Vespasian, Narcissus orders him to detail a small detachment of men to infiltrate British territory and retrieve the lost pay chest. Vespasian chooses Macro and Cato to lead the detachment. Several days after the initial landings, somewhere in the Isle of Thanet, Macro and Cato's mission is a success, but before they can return with the pay chest, Vitellius appears with a small band of mercenaries, attempting to kill them and steal the chest for himself. He is repulsed and escapes on his horse, inadvertently discovering a British force led by the warlord Togodumnus, setting up an ambush along the legion's line of march. Attempting to get back to the 2nd Legion and save his own skin, Vitellius panics and mistakes the Legion's cavalry scouts for the British, and flees in the opposite direction.

Spotting the British ambush, Cato attempts to warn the column, and while the ambush succeeds in killing a great deal of legionaries, it is fought off when the 14th Legion, whom Vitellius stumbled on and warned, arrives to reinforce them. Macro and Cato fight heroically in defense of their comrades, and Macro kills Togodumnus in single combat.

Vitellius manages to claim credit for discovering the British ambush and bringing up the 14th as reinforcement, making him a hero in the Roman camp. In private conference with Vespasian, Vitellius admits that he is Narcissus's agent inside the army, and that is how he learned of the mission to retrieve the chest, and freely admits that he decided to steal it for himself to advance his own ambitions. Yet he is confident that Vespasian can do nothing against him, since Vitellius has evidence that Vespasian's own wife, Flavia Domitillia, is the suspected traitor that Vespasian was warned about. She switched out the confidential letter from Narcissus that Vitellius's hired thief attempted to steal with a decoy, and she, not Vitellius, arranged the attempted assassination of Narcissus on the road to Gesoriacum, attempting to abort the British invasion and fatally discredit the Emperor. Stricken, Vespasian can do nothing except agree that Vitellius is, for the moment, untouchable.

Macro and Cato succeed in returning the chest to Narcissus, but they are likewise powerless to take action against Vitellius. Cato also senses from the hostility of the British captives that the Roman conquest of Britain will be much longer and more difficult than the Emperor's propaganda claims.

== Characters ==
- Quintus Licinius Cato: main protagonist, an optio, Macro's new second-in-command in the Second Legion
- Lucius Cornelius Macro: a newly promoted centurion of the Second Legion
- Narcissus: Imperial Secretary
- Vespasian: Legate of the Second Legion
- Vitellius: duplicitous tribune of the Second Legion
- Flavia Domitilla: Vespasian's wife;
- Aulus Plautius: General in overall command of the British expedition;
- Lavinia: slave girl purchased by Flavia, formerly Vitellius's mistress.
