= Rumour Has It (novel) =

2009 novel by Jill Mansell

- First edition
- Author: Jill Mansell
- Language: English
- Genre: British literature, romantic comedy
- Published: 2009 (Headline Review)
- Publication place: United Kingdom
- Media type: Print (hardcover, paperback, & e-book)
- Pages: 416 pp (paperback)
- ISBN: 978-0-7553-2819-2 (paperback)
- OCLC: 466361584
- Preceded by: An Offer You Can't Refuse
- Followed by: Jill Mansell: Take a Chance on Me

Rumour Has It is a novel by British author Jill Mansell. It spent eight weeks on The Sunday Times hardback bestseller list in 2009, and the paperback ranked third on The Sunday Times' bestseller list.

== Characters ==
- Tilly Cole
- Jack Lucas

== Publication history ==
- 2009, UK, Headline Review (ISBN 978-0-7553-2817-8), pub date 5 February 2009, hardback
- 2009, UK, Headline Review (ISBN 978-0-7553-2819-2), pub date 25 June 2009, paperback
- 2009, UK, Headline Review (ISBN 9780755353385), pub date 3 May 2009, e-book
