= Praetorian (novel) =

2011 novel by Simon Scarrow

- First UK edition cover
- Author: Simon Scarrow
- Language: English
- Series: Eagles of the Empire
- Genre: Historical novel
- Publisher: Headline (UK)
- Publication date: 10 November 2011
- Publication place: United Kingdom
- Media type: Print (hardback & paperback)
- Pages: 497
- ISBN: 978-0-7553-5377-4
- Preceded by: The Legion
- Followed by: The Blood Crows

Praetorian (2011) is the eleventh book in the Eagles of the Empire series by Simon Scarrow.

== Plot summary ==
Macro and Cato are spending their days at an inn in Ostia, awaiting orders from Emperor Claudius's secretary, Narcissus. Narcissus finally arrives and orders the duo to go undercover in the Praetorian Guard to uncover a plot to assassinate the emperor.

As instructed, the duo joins the Praetorian guard under different names and try to uncover the plot. During their operation they face their old foe, Vitellius.

They succeed in saving the emperor on more than one occasion. In the climax, it is hinted that they will return to Britain to help in the invasion there.
