= The Eagle's Prophecy =

2006 novel by Simon Scarrow

- First UK edition cover
- Author: Simon Scarrow
- Language: English
- Series: Eagles of the Empire
- Genre: Historical novel
- Publisher: Headline (UK)
- Publication date: 2006
- Publication place: United Kingdom
- Media type: Print (hardback and paperback)
- ISBN: 978-0-7553-0117-1
- Preceded by: The Eagle's Prey
- Followed by: The Eagle in the Sand

The Eagle's Prophecy is an historical novel by Simon Scarrow, published in 2006 and set in ancient Rome.

== Summary ==
During the 1st century AD, a pirate squadron under the command of Telemachus captures a Roman ship carrying a high-ranking Roman dignitary and his personal cargo, a set of scrolls. Realising the nature of the scrolls, Telemachus takes the dignitary prisoner and fires the vessel.

Meanwhile, Centurions Cato and Macro are living in Rome, awaiting reassignment to the legions after being compelled to quit the army invading Britain. Narcissus, the Emperor's secretary and spymaster, recruits Cato and Macro for a dangerous assignment. Due to the suspicious conspiratorial nature of the events surrounding the death of their previous commander, Centurion Maximius, both their lives are forfeit should they refuse.

Narcissus reassigns them to the Roman Imperial Navy, stationing them at Ravenna. Telemachus and his pirates are growing bolder and the navy is tasked with destroying them. However, the operation is merely a cover for Narcissus' real objective: the recovery of the scrolls, the nature of which is classified. During Cato and Macro's trip to Ravenna, they rescue a Greek merchant, Anobarbus, being tortured by brigands in the hills.

Upon their arrival, it is revealed Narcissus has placed Tribune - now Prefect - Vitellius in command of the operation, souring relations with the two centurions. Furthermore, there is no love lost between Macro and the Imperial Marines; he reveals to Cato that his mother had run off with a marine twenty years before, abandoning him and his father, leaving him with a burning hatred for marines ever since. Macro and Cato strike up a friendship with Centurion Minicius, an aging auxiliary veteran who acquaints them with life at sea.
