= The Eagle and the Wolves =

2003 novel by Simon Scarrow

The Eagle and The Wolves
- UK first edition cover
- Author: Simon Scarrow
- Language: English
- Series: Eagles of the Empire
- Genre: Historical novel
- Publisher: Headline (UK)
- Publication date: 2003
- Publication place: United Kingdom
- Media type: Print (hardback & paperback)
- ISBN: 978-0-7553-0113-3
- Preceded by: When the Eagle Hunts
- Followed by: The Eagle's Prey

The Eagle and The Wolves is a 2003 novel by Simon Scarrow, the fourth book in the Eagles of the Empire series where main characters Macro and Cato command two cohorts of soldiers made up of warriors and nobles from the Atrebatan kingdom. This book follows their adventures in 44 AD during the occupation of Britain by Rome and Caratacus's following rebellion.

== Plot summary ==
The book begins with the aftermath of the last book as Cato and Macro recover from their injuries in the Atrebatan capital city of Calleva. The Durotrigans are still at large raiding the Roman supply lines in Atrebatan territory. The Legate Vespasian with a small bodyguard comes to investigate the stop of the supply lines, but is caught up in a skirmish to save a caravan of supplies. The raiders are only just fended off with most of the guards killed. The Atrebatan king, Verica, demands that Vespasian leave troops to protect the kingdom. Vespasian is unable to leave troops, but instead has Centurions Macro and Cato to train local troops. The two make good progress training two cohorts of locals as Roman troops. The two cohorts are named the Wolves and the Boars, and in their first combat action, ambush a Durotrigan raiding party of some 500 men, resulting in a much-needed victory. In light of such success General Plautius is worried that arming disloyal locals would endanger his rear flank against Caracutus and sends a Tribune Quintillus with procurator powers to assess the situation.

The situation at Calleva is dangerous as the locals are questioning whether they should be aiding the British resistance instead of Rome. Internal politics run rife and an assassination attempt is made on the King, who is grievously injured in the attempt. The Boars and Wolves are called to attack a raiding party, but it is revealed to be a trap. The army routs and most of the troops are massacred before they make it back to Calleva. Only around 200-odd of the 960 men escape back into the city. Tincommius, the king's "loyal" nephew is revealed to be the would-be assassin and has set siege to the city in a power play with the Durotrigans. Cato and Macro's men are forced to abandon the walls and fall back to the royal enclosure as the enemy numbers overwhelm the loyalist army. The Legate Vespasian's relief forces soon arrive to drive the enemy from the city, only to abandon it after hearing news of Caracutus' superior flanking force. Forced into battle Vespasian's forces attempt a last stand against the British onslaught, only to be saved by the pursuing forces of General Plautius. Victory is snatched from the jaws of defeat. The novel finishes with the Atrebatan Kingdom annexed regardless and the remaining Boars and Wolves disbanded. Centurion's Macro and Cato are left with another set of medals and reinstatement to the 3rd Cohort, with Cato commanding the 6th Century.
