= The Generals (novel) =

2007 novel by Simon Scarrow

- English First Edition
- Author: Simon Scarrow
- Cover artist: Tim Byrne
- Language: English
- Series: Wellington and Napoleon Quartet
- Genre: Historical novel
- Publisher: Hodder Headline
- Publication date: 31 May 2007
- Publication place: United Kingdom
- Media type: Print (Hardback)
- Pages: 554 pp
- ISBN: 0-7553-2435-8
- OCLC: 78989335
- Preceded by: Young Bloods
- Followed by: Fire and Sword

The Generals is the second volume in Simon Scarrow's Wellington and Napoleon Quartet, which narrates mostly in alternate chapters, tells the story of Sir Arthur Wellesley (the future Duke of Wellington) and the Corsican Brigadier Napoleon Bonaparte (the future Emperor of France).

== Plot ==
In the turbulent aftermath of the French Revolution, Napoleon Bonaparte is accused of treachery and corruption. His reputation is saved by his skill in leading his men to victory in Italy and Egypt. But then he must rush home to France to restore order amidst political unrest, and to find peace or victory over the country's enemies, foremost of which is England and Arthur Wellesley (the future Duke of Wellington).

Wellesley is on the other side of the world in India where British interests are under threat. Wellesley leads vast armies against a series of powerful warlords in campaigns that will result in the creation of the Raj, the jewel in the crown of the British Empire. He returns to England a hardened veteran and more determined than ever to end France's dominion of Europe.
