= Brothers in Blood (novel) =

2014 novel by Simon Scarrow

- First UK edition cover
- Author: Simon Scarrow
- Language: English
- Series: Eagles of the Empire
- Genre: Historical novel
- Publisher: Headline Publishing Group (UK)
- Publication date: 2014
- Publication place: United Kingdom
- Media type: Print (hardback & paperback)
- Pages: 384
- ISBN: 978-0-7553-9393-0
- Preceded by: The Blood Crows
- Followed by: Britannia

Brothers in Blood is the thirteenth novel in the Eagles of the Empire series by Simon Scarrow. It was published in 2014 by Headline in the UK. This saga tells the story of the adventures of two legionaries, Cato and Macro, in the legions of the Roman Empire in the mid-1st century AD.

== Cover description ==
A messenger on the streets of Rome has been intercepted and tortured, revealing a plot to sabotage the Roman army's campaign against Caratacus, commander of Britannia's native tribes. A treacherous agent's mission is to open a second front of attack against them and eliminate the two Roman soldiers who could stand in the way. Unwarned, Cato and Macro are with the Roman army pursuing Caratacus and his men through the mountains of Britannia. Defeating Caratacus finally seems within their grasp. But the plot against the two heroes threatens not only their military goals but also their lives.
