= Fast Friends =

Fast Friends may refer to:

- Fast Friends (game show), a 1991 British game show
- Fast Friends (novel), a 1991 novel by Jill Mansell
- "Fast Friends" (Full House), a 1993 television episode
