= Don't Want to Miss a Thing =

2013 novel by Jill Mansell

Don’t Want to Miss a Thing
- First edition
- Author: Jill Mansell
- Language: English
- Genre: British literature, romantic comedy
- Published: 2013 (Headline Review)
- Publication place: United Kingdom
- Media type: Print (hardback, paperback, & e-book)
- Pages: 432 pp (paperback)
- ISBN: 978-0-7553-5589-1 (paperback)
- OCLC: 827841852
- Preceded by: Jill Mansell: A Walk in the Park
- Followed by: The Unpredictable Consequences of Love

Don’t Want to Miss a Thing is the 24th novel by British author Jill Mansell.

== Plot summary ==
This romantic comedy explores the impact of grief and unexpected parenthood.

== Characters ==
- Dexter Yates
- Molly Hayes

== Release details ==
- 2013, UK, Headline Review (ISBN 978-0-7553-5587-7), pub date 31 January 2013, hardback
- 2013, UK, Headline Review (ISBN 978-0-7553-5589-1), pub date 20 June 2013, paperback
- 2013, UK, Headline Review (ISBN 9780755355990), pub date 31 January 2013, e-book
