= The Unpredictable Consequences of Love =

2014 novel by Jill Mansell

- Headline Review paperback edition
- Author: Jill Mansell
- Language: English
- Genre: British literature, romantic comedy
- Published: 2014 (Headline Review)
- Publication place: United Kingdom
- Media type: Print (hardback, paperback, & e-book)
- Pages: 400 pp (paperback)
- ISBN: 0-755-35593-8 (paperback)
- OCLC: 862759268
- Preceded by: Don't Want to Miss a Thing

The Unpredictable Consequences of Love is the 25th novel by British author Jill Mansell.

== Plot summary ==
The Unpredictable Consequences of Love explores the intertwined lives of the residents in a fictional coastal town in Cornwall.

== Characters ==
- Sophie Wells
- Josh Strachan
- Tula Kaye
- Riley Bryant

== Release details ==
- 2014, UK, Headline Review (ISBN 0755355911), pub date 30 January 2014, hardback
- 2014, UK, Headline Review (ISBN 0755355938), pub date 5 June 2014, paperback
- 2014, UK, Headline Review (ISBN 9780755355990), pub date 30 January 2014, e-book
