= Invictus (novel) =

2016 novel by Simon Scarrow

- UK first edition cover
- Author: Simon Scarrow
- Language: English
- Series: Eagles of the Empire
- Genre: Historical novel
- Publisher: Headline (UK)
- Publication date: 17 November 2016
- Publication place: United Kingdom
- Media type: Print (hardback & paperback)
- Pages: 352
- ISBN: 978-1-4722-1335-8
- Preceded by: Britannia
- Followed by: Day of the Caesars

Invictus, published in 2016, is the fifteenth volume of the Eagles of the Empire series by Simon Scarrow.

== Cover description ==
AD 54. The soldiers of the Roman army patrol a vast Empire, enforcing imperial rule with brutal efficiency.

In Hispania, tensions have reached boiling point. Bands of rebels range over the land. A unit of the army's finest is dispatched to restore the peace. Their commander is Vitellius, a veteran of unmatched ambition.

Prefect Cato and Centurion Macro are amongst the Roman troops. Their mission is fraught with danger: on the one hand, feuding tribes, challenging terrain and an embittered populace. On the other: intrigue against the aging Emperor Claudius.

Only through strategic brilliance, unparalleled courage and the smile of good fortune can Macro and Cato hope to triumph - or even survive...
