= The Eagle's Conquest =

2001 novel by Simon Scarrow

- First edition cover
- Author: Simon Scarrow
- Language: English
- Series: Eagles of the Empire
- Genre: Historical novel
- Publisher: Headline (UK) & Thomas Dunne Books (USA)
- Publication date: 2 August 2001
- Publication place: United Kingdom
- Media type: Print (hardback & paperback)
- Pages: 256 (hardback edition) & 434 (paperback edition)
- ISBN: 0-7472-7283-2 (hardback edition) & 0-7472-6630-1 (paperback edition)
- OCLC: 59550632
- Preceded by: Under the Eagle
- Followed by: When the Eagle Hunts

The Eagle's Conquest is a 2001 novel by Simon Scarrow, about the Roman invasion of Britain in 43 AD. It is the second book in the Eagles of the Empire series.

== Plot summary ==
The book opens immediately after the events of Under the Eagle, with the troops relaxing and watching prisoners of war fight to the death in a makeshift arena. Optio Cato is bequeathed an ivory-hilted sword by the chief centurion, Bestia, who was mortally wounded in the British ambush and respected Cato for his tenacity. Meanwhile, the legate of the Second Legion, Vespasian, worries about his wife Flavia back in Rome, whom he has learned has connections to "The Liberators", a group of conspirators who want the feeble-minded Emperor Claudius out of power.

Soon afterwards the Legion moves off again, heading to the River Meadway (present-day Medway river, in Kent). As the Britons under Caratacus have heavily fortified the opposite bank, Macro and Cato are ordered to scout ahead for a ford upstream. Cato finds one, and the next day the attack goes in. The Ninth Legion, supported by artillery fire from triremes on the river, crosses and assault the enemy ramparts. After sustaining heavy losses, the attack falters, and only the Second Legion's intervention saves the day. Using the ford upstream, the legionaries are able to surprise the Britons and attack them from behind, overrunning their encampment; Cato is badly burned when he accidentally spills a cauldron of boiling water over himself. While recuperating, he strikes up a friendship with the North African surgeon, a Carthaginian called Nisus. They discover that the lead shot the British were using in their slings came from the Legion's stores, indicating there is a traitor placed high in the army command, supplying the British with arms in an attempt to undermine the campaign.

Over the next few days, the British are pushed back to the North Kent marshes, on the banks of the Tamesis river. The Second Legion is ordered to clear the southern bank in preparation for a crossing, but as twilight approaches, the Legion is scattered and lost in the marshes. Macro's unit, with Cato in tow, is ambushed by a war band; Macro holds the Britons at bay while Cato and a handful of men escape by boat. When the roll call is held, Macro is declared missing, presumed dead. Cato, in a fit of anguish, volunteers to be in the first wave of the troops crossing the river. It is a suicide mission, and he does not expect to live, but he is able to survive long enough for the second wave of Romans to reach him. Macro reappears, having survived his ordeal in the marshes, and chastises Cato for being a fool. Cato renews his friendship with Nisus the surgeon, who lets slip some of his bitterness at being a Carthaginian (one of many cultures conquered by the Romans) in the Roman army.

Meanwhile, the army has received orders to halt on the far side of the Tamesis so that Emperor Claudius can arrive and take command in person for the final assault in the British capital at Camulodunum; this is intended to boost his popularity with the populares in Rome. While waiting for the Emperor to arrive, tribune Vitellius, Macro and Cato's nemesis, is plotting to assassinate him. He enlists Nisus, playing on his Carthaginian patriotism, and uses him as a liaison with the British tribes who resist Rome. Unfortunately, while crossing the lines one night, Nisus is accidentally killed by a sentry, and Cato, who is present, takes a bandage from his body; it is covered in strange markings and Cato thinks these are worth investigating. All thought of it is put out of his mind, however, when Claudius arrives, escorted by the Praetorian Guard and elephants to overawe the Britons. He insists on taking charge in the coming battle.

Despite the Emperor's buffoonery, the final battle is won and the legions march into Camulodunum. To celebrate 'his' victory, Claudius orders a lavish banquet to be held in his honour.

Vespasian finally gets to spend some time with his wife, and Cato renews his relationship with the slave girl Lavinia. Unfortunately, she is allied with Vitellius, having consorted with him previously whilst in the ownership of Tribune Plinius. She agrees to smuggle an ornate dagger into the banquet hall, believing it to be a gift for the Emperor. Before she does this, she decides to break up with Cato, who is aware that she is cheating on him with Vitellius. While she does this, Cato is fiddling with the late Nisus's bandage, which he has in his pocket. When it is rolled up in a certain way, the markings become a coded message; Cato is only able to discover that it concerns a plot to kill the emperor before he is knocked out by Lavinia, who read on ahead and saw Vitellius' name. When he is woken by Macro, Lavinia has disappeared. The only hope of saving the Emperor is to warn Vespasian, who is at the feast, and hope he believes them. They get there in time to see Vitellius and Lavinia being presented to the emperor; while Claudius is distracted by Lavinia's charms, a supposedly loyal Briton leaps at the emperor with a dagger.

Thanks to Cato's intervention, the Emperor's bodyguards are able to catch the assassin and mortally wound him. Vitellius finishes him off before he can talk, and discreetly murders Lavinia as he leaves. A distraught Cato is taken away by Macro before he is recognised as the Emperor's saviour, and Vitellius, as in the last book, gets all the credit. He is given a position on the Emperor's staff, and leaves with Claudius for Rome, leaving the legions to pacify the last remnants of resistance. Vespasian is tasked with an independent command for the coming months; clearing the south bank of the Thames of resistance. As for Cato, he is distracted by Macro, who promises to introduce him to his latest conquest - a young Briton called Boudicca.

== Literary significance and reception ==
The Oxford Times stated, "Has all the hallmarks of Bernard Cornwell at his best."

== See also ==
- Battle of the Medway
