= The Fields of Death =

2010 novel by Simon Scarrow

- First edition
- Author: Simon Scarrow
- Cover artist: Tim Byrne
- Language: English
- Series: Wellington and Napoleon Quartet
- Genre: Historical novel
- Publisher: Headline Review
- Publication date: 24 June 2010
- Publication place: United Kingdom
- Media type: Print (hardback)
- Preceded by: Fire and Sword

The Fields of Death is the fourth and final novel in the Wellington and Napoleon Quartet by Simon Scarrow, which tells the story of the French Revolution and the Napoleonic Wars from the point of view of Sir Arthur Wellesley (the future Duke of Wellington) and Napoleon Bonaparte.

== Plot ==
The book covers the time period between April 1809 and 1815, the climax of the conflict at the Battle of Waterloo. At the start of the novel, Napoleon is facing increasing pressure as his marshals are repeatedly defeated by Arthur Wellesley, leading the allied armies of Britain and Spain. The plot of the novel revolves around Napoleon's wars in central Europe and failed invasion of Russia, as his armies rapidly lose men and their reputation for invincibility. Running parallel to this story, Arthur Wellesley is leading the allied forces to victory in the Peninsular War, before invading Southern France. The novel ends with Napoleon and Wellington finally meeting in battle at Waterloo.
