= The Gladiator (Scarrow novel) =

2009 novel by Simon Scarrow

- First UK edition cover
- Author: Simon Scarrow
- Language: English
- Series: Eagles of the Empire
- Genre: Historical novel
- Publisher: Headline (UK)
- Publication date: 2009
- Publication place: United Kingdom
- Media type: Print (hardback & paperback)
- Pages: 320
- ISBN: 978-0-7553-2778-2
- Preceded by: Centurion
- Followed by: The Legion

The Gladiator is a 2009 novel (ISBN 0-7553-2778-0) by Simon Scarrow and the ninth book in the Eagle series. It features the return of Macro and Cato, this time up against a ruthless gladiator in the Island of Crete after their ship is damaged by a tidal wave on their way to Rome.
