= Gladiator: Vengeance =

2014 book by Simon Scarrow

- Author: Simon Scarrow
- Language: English
- Series: Gladiator series
- Genre: Young Adult Fiction
- Publisher: Penguin Books (UK)
- Publication date: 2014
- Publication place: United Kingdom
- Pages: 304 pp. (paperback)
- ISBN: 978-0-14-133903-0 (paperback)
- Preceded by: Gladiator: Son of Spartacus

Gladiator: Vengeance is the fourth book in the Gladiator Series, by Simon Scarrow.

== Plot summary ==
Marcus may be free from the brutal training regime of the gladiators but he will not rest until he finds his mother. With his old friends Festus and Lupus at his side, and a letter from Caesar instructing all who cross his path to help him, he begins his journey. He is going back to the lands where he lived as a slave boy: the remote farming estate of the savage Decimus. Yet Ancient Greece is ruled by deceit and corruption. Many do not want to see Marcus succeed. Many more would rather see him dead.

== Style ==
The Gladiator series is intended for young teens and older, with a targeted age group of 11 years old and up. The story is quite clear, fast and without excessive details. The frequent action scenes are described very precisely and graphically.
