= Blessings (novel) =

2024 novel by Chukwuebuka Ibeh

- Author: Chukwuebuka Ibeh
- Publisher: Viking Books
- Publication date: 4 June 2024
- ISBN: 9780735248052

Blessings is a 2024 novel by Nigerian author Chukwuebuka Ibeh. It was published by Penguin Random House's Viking Books imprint in 2024.

== Plot summary ==
Obiefuna Is the first child of his parents. Regarded as a blessing to the family by his mother, his life changes drastically when an apprentice of his father’s comes to live with them. Aboy comes into the household and awakens in Obiefuna, feelings he never knew he had. When his father discovers them in a rather intimate situation, he sends Obiefuna off to boarding school and sends Aboy out of the house. Through whirlwinds and trials, Obiefuna discovers himself in this epic tale of self realization.

== Author ==
Chukwuebuka Ibeh was born in Port Harcourt, Nigeria, in 2000. He is currently pursuing an MFA degree at Washington University in St. Louis, Missouri. His writing, described by Chimamanda Ngozi Adichie as "so wonderfully observant...with a nostalgia for the past", has appeared in McSweeney's Quarterly Review, The New England Review of Books, Dappled Things. and Lolwe. In 2019, he was named by Electric Literature as one of the "Most Promising New Voices of Nigerian Fiction".

== Development and publication ==
Viking Books announced its acquisition of Ibeh's "miraculous" debut novel in October 2022. In May 2023, a year before the book's release, the film rights were sold to The Artists Partnership, a talent agency based in London. In that same month, Ibeh gave a TEDx Talk entitled "What Are African Values?" delivered at TEDxWUSTL in St Louis, Missouri.

== Reception ==
Blessings was positively received, including public recommendation from Zadie Smith. In The New York Times, Joshua Barone praised the novel's prose, describing it as "revelatory yet unresolved, simple yet polyphonic, hopeful yet full of heartbreak." A five-star review in The Telegraph called it "a smart literary attack on Nigeria's anti-gay laws." The Observer described the novel as a "poignant tale of a talented and sensitive Nigerian boy, Obiefuna, who is caught by his conservative father in a clinch with another young man", ultimately deeming it "an emotive, affecting debut". Buzz Magazine called it "a profound exploration of identity and acceptance." The Sunday Times called it "a moving debut about love and loneliness."

In a slightly less enthusiastic review, The Times Literary Supplement praised the book's "remarkably well-executed scenes", while saying it expected "a more compelling portrayal of the city and people of Port Harcourt".

Blessings was shortlisted for the 2024 Wilbur Smith Adventure Writing Prize. The book landed among Esquire's list of recommended books of 2024. USA Today named it among the year's "best books by Black authors".
