= Sugar Money (novel) =

2017 novel by British author Jane Harris

- First edition
- Author: Jane Harris
- Language: English
- Publisher: Faber & Faber
- Publication date: 3 Oct 2017
- Publication place: United Kingdom
- Media type: Print
- Pages: 320
- ISBN: 0571336957

Sugar Money, the third novel by British author Jane Harris, was first published by Faber and Faber in 2017 and shortlisted for several literary prizes including the Walter Scott Prize. The novel was also published in the United States by Arcade/Skyhorse, in Australia and New Zealand by Allen and Unwin and in Italy by Neri Pozza.

== Summary ==
In Martinique, 1765, brothers Emile and Lucien are charged by their French master, Father Cleophas, with a mission. They must return to Grenada, the island they once called home, and smuggle back the 42 slaves claimed by English invaders at the hospital plantation in Fort Royal. While Lucien, barely in his teens, sees the trip as a great adventure, the older and more mature Emile has grasped the dangers they will face. But with no choice other than to obey Cleophas, Emile sets out with his brother on this ‘reckless venture’ while sensing an unlikely possibility of finding his first love Celeste.

== Reception ==
Sugar Money was published in October 2017 to critical acclaim with widespread positive reviews.

Sunday Express said "Pitches you headfirst into this outstanding, heartbreaking story of siblings, slavery and the savagery of the colonial past." Siobhan Murphy of The Times said "Harris builds a lush sense of place, and the pace and tension of a rip-roaring adventure here, with derring-do and double-crossing." The Irish Times said "Through masterful detail, Harris shows the dehumanisation of the brothers and their fellow slaves ... Beautifully cadenced."

== Shortlistings ==
- Walter Scott Prize (2018)
- Wilbur Smith Adventure Writing Prize 2018
- Historical Writers' Association (HWA) Gold Crown 2018

== Publication ==
It was published in the UK by Faber and Faber, in the US by Viking Press, and in Australia/New Zealand by Allen & Unwin. It has been published in the Netherlands, Italy, Denmark, Greece, Spain, Germany, Norway, Poland, France, Portugal, Sweden and Brazil. It is due to be published in Israel, Serbia and Montenegro, Romania, Croatia, Russia, and Turkey. An audiobook version is available, narrated by the author. There is also a Danish audiobook version.
