= Fast Friends (novel) =

1991 novel by Jill Mansell

- First edition
- Author: Jill Mansell
- Language: English
- Genre: British literature, romantic comedy
- Published: 1991 (Bantam Press) & 2006 (Headline Review)
- Publication place: United Kingdom
- Media type: Print (paperback & e-book)
- Pages: 608 pp (paperback)
- ISBN: 0-755-33249-0 (paperback)
- OCLC: 70059963
- Followed by: Solo

Fast Friends is a novel by British author Jill Mansell, about three school friends reunited after several years apart.

== Background ==
Jill Mansell first had the idea for the book after reading an article in a magazine about women who had changed their lives by becoming best-selling authors. Eventually she decided to write the kind of book "I would love to read". The end result was Fast Friends.

== Plot summary ==
The story begins when housewife and mother Camilla Stewart impulsively invites her old school friends for dinner. However, Roz Vallender and Loulou Marks are no ordinary guests. Camilla soon discovers that her husband Jack has been having an affair and she decides to make some changes in her life. With a little help from her friends, Camilla finds out that life in the fast lane is a lot more fun and that the future holds plenty of surprises.

== Characters ==
- Camilla Stewart
- Roz Vallender
- Loulou Marks

== Release details ==
- 1991, UK, Bantam Press (ISBN 059302382X), pub date 14 February 1991, hardback (first edition)
- 2006, UK, Headline Review (ISBN 0755332490), pub date 4 September 2006, paperback
- 2008, UK, Headline Review (ISBN 9780755351886), pub date 10 February 2008, e-book
