= Thomas Mogford =

British author (born 1977)

Thomas Mogford (born 10 April 1977, in Oxford) is a British author known for his historical fiction, and for the Spike Sanguinetti series of crime novels. He came up with the character of Spike after reading Law as a postgraduate at City University, London, and travelling to Gibraltar to look into praticising there.

The first novel in the series, Shadow of the Rock, was shortlisted for the ITV3 Crime Thriller Awards for best debut writer. The second, Sign of the Cross, and third Hollow Mountain, were both shortlisted for the CrimeFest eDunnit Award. Writing in the Sunday Express, the critic Jake Kerridge hailed the books as 'one of the most enjoyable crime series of recent years'.

Mogford’s 2022 book, The Plant Hunter, marked a move into historical fiction. The novel is ‘a sweeping love story and white-knuckle adventure ride, set in 1867 bringing to life a period in history when real-life Indiana Jones characters risked their lives to find the exotic plants that fill our gardens today,’ according to The Bookseller. It was chosen as a ‘Best Book of the Summer’ by the Daily Telegraph, and was shortlisted for the 2022 Wilbur Smith Adventure Writing Prize.

Mogford’s latest historical novel, The Saffron Thief, was published by HarperCollins on 30 July 2026. It was a Sunday Times Historical Fiction pick for 2026, and was described by the Daily Express as a ‘thrilling heist novel’ in which ‘the pace never lets up’. The sequel will be published in the summer of 2027.

Thomas Mogford is married to the novelist and screenwriter Alison Rea and they live with their family in London.

== Bibliography ==
- Shadow of the Rock (2012)
- Sign of the Cross (2013)
- Hollow Mountain (2014)
- Sleeping Dogs (2015)
- A Thousand Cuts (2017)
- The Plant Hunter (2022)
- The Saffron Thief (2026)
