= Gladiator: Fight for Freedom =

2011 book by Simon Scarrow

- Author: Simon Scarrow
- Language: English
- Series: Gladiator series
- Genre: Young Adult Fiction
- Publisher: Penguin Books (UK); Hyperion Books (USA)
- Publication date: 3 February 2011
- Publication place: United Kingdom
- Pages: 352 pp. (paperback); 272 pp. (hardcover)
- ISBN: 978-0-14-133363-2 (paperback); ISBN 978-1-4231-5101-2 (hardcover)
- Followed by: Gladiator: Street Fighter

Gladiator: Fight for Freedom is the first book in the Gladiator Series, by Simon Scarrow and is his first book for young adults. Set in Rome in 61 BC, it tells the story of Marcus Cornelius Primus who is enslaved and becomes a gladiator.

== Plot summary ==
Marcus Cornelius Primus is a young gladiator that was a farm boy until he was kidnapped away from his mother and father, who is a retired centurion. He is sold as a slave to a gladiator school and is trying to find help and justice to stop the people that took him.

== Style ==
The Gladiator series is intended for young teens and older. The story is quite clear, fast and without excessive details. The frequent action scenes are described very precisely and graphically.
