= Britannia (novel) =

2015 novel by Simon Scarrow

- UK first edition cover
- Author: Simon Scarrow
- Language: English
- Series: Eagles of the Empire
- Genre: Historical novel
- Publisher: Headline Publishing Group (UK)
- Publication date: 19 November 2015
- Publication place: United Kingdom
- Media type: Print (hardback & paperback)
- Pages: 448
- ISBN: 978-1-4722-1331-0
- Preceded by: Brothers in Blood
- Followed by: Invictus

Britannia is the fourteenth novel in the Eagles of the Empire series by Simon Scarrow. It was published in 2015 by Headline in the UK.

== Cover description ==
Roman Britain, AD 52. The western tribes, inspired by the Druids' hatred of the Romans, prepare to make a stand. But can they match the discipline and courage of the legionaries? Wounded during a skirmish, Centurion Macro remains behind in charge of the fort as Prefect Cato leads an invasion deep into the hills. Cato's mission: to cement Rome's triumph over the natives by crushing the Druid stronghold. But with winter drawing in, the terrain is barely passable through icy rain and snowstorms. When Macro's patrols report that the natives in the vicinity of the garrison are thinning out, a terrible suspicion takes shape in the battle-scarred soldier's mind. Has the acting Governor, Legate Quintatus, underestimated the enemy, his military judgement undermined by ambition? If there is a sophisticated and deadly plan afoot, it's Cato and his men who will pay the price.
