= Jill Mansell =

British author of romantic comedy

Jill Mansell (born 15 June 1957) is a British author of romantic comedy. Her books have sold over fifteen million copies worldwide.

== Background and personal life ==
Mansell grew up in the Cotswolds and attended Sir William Romney's School in Tetbury. After working at the Burden Neurological Institute in Bristol for many years, she became a full-time writer in 1992.

She lives in Bristol with her husband.

== Writing career ==
Mansell is among the bestselling and most well-known romcom authors. She is one of the top 20 British female novelists of the 21st century (in terms of sales) and has been worth almost £14.5m to the market since 2000. In 2009, The Daily Telegraph listed her as one of the best-selling authors of the decade. Her novel Rumour Has It spent eight weeks on The Sunday Times' hardback bestseller list in 2009, and the paperback ranked third on The Sunday Times' bestseller list. An Offer You Can't Refuse was on The Sunday Times' paperback charts for five weeks in 2008. In 2008, sales of Mansell's novels in their Headline editions around the world were recorded at over four million copies. The e-book of Miranda's Big Mistake ranked eleventh on The New York Times bestseller list in 2011.

== Awards and honours ==
In 2011, Take a Chance On Me won the Romantic Novelists Association's Romantic Comedy Prize. The judges said the book has "beautifully understated humour" and is "an utter delight." In 2012, To The Moon And Back was shortlisted for the Romantic Novelists Association's Contemporary Romantic Novel award. In 2015, Mansell was presented with an Outstanding Achievement award by the RNA.

== Novels ==
- Fast Friends (1991)
- Solo (1992)
- Kiss (1993)
- Sheer Mischief (1994)
- Open House (1995)
- Two's Company (1996)
- Perfect Timing (1997)
- Head Over Heels (1998)
- Mixed Doubles (1998)
- Miranda's Big Mistake (1999)
- Good at Games (2000)
- Millie's Fling (2001)
- Nadia Knows Best (2002)
- Staying at Daisy's (2002)
- Falling for You (2003)
- The One You Really Want (2004)
- Making Your Mind Up (2006)
- Thinking of You (2007)
- An Offer You Can't Refuse (2008)
- Rumour Has It (2009)
- Take a Chance On Me (2010)
- To the Moon And Back (2011)
- A Walk in the Park (2012)
- Don't Want to Miss a Thing (2013)
- The Unpredictable Consequences of Love (2014)
- Three Amazing Things About You (2015)
- You And Me, Always (2016)
- Meet Me at Beachcomber Bay (2017)
- This Could Change Everything (2018)
- Maybe This Time (2019)
- It Started With a Secret (2020)
- And Now You're Back (2021)
- Should I Tell You? (2022)
- Promise Me (2023)
- The Wedding of the Year (2024)
- An Almost Perfect Summer (2025)
