= Priscilla Morris =

British writer

- Born: Priscilla Tania Morris; 1973 (age 52–53); Cambridge, England
- Education: University of Cambridge; University of East Anglia
- Website: priscillamorris.org

Priscilla Morris
- Education: University of East Anglia
- Occupations: Lecturer; Writer
- Writing career
- Notable work: Black Butterflies

Priscilla Tania Morris (born 1973) is an English author and lecturer. Her debut novel Black Butterflies (2023) was shortlisted for the Women's Prize for Fiction among other accolades.

== Early life and career ==
Morris was born in Cambridge to a mother from Sarajevo, Bosnia and an English/Cornish father. Growing up, she spent her summers in Sarajevo.

In 1993, relatives fleeing the siege of Sarajevo stayed at her family's home in London. Her father used a Times press pass to travel to Sarajevo and rescue his parents in law. Her great uncle, artist Dobrivoje Beljkašić, also fled the siege of Sarajevo.

Morris began her studies in Italian and Spanish at Cambridge University in 1993 before switching to Social Anthropology. After graduating, she worked as an English-language teacher in Barcelona and London and then as a legal journalist in Brighton. Morris returned to university to complete both a Master of Arts (MA) and a PhD in creative writing from the University of East Anglia. She lectured at University College London, City University of London and Kingston University. In 2019, she joined University College Dublin.

== Writing career ==
Morris' debut novel Black Butterflies is set during the siege of Sarajevo and was inspired by the experiences of Morris and her family. In 2023, it was shortlisted for the Women's Prize for Fiction, the Ondaatje Prize, the Authors' Club Best First Novel Award and the Wilbur Smith Adventure Writing Prize. In 2025 it was the runner-up for the Dayton Literary Peace Prize for fiction. It sold 5,979 copies before the 3rd of June 2023.

== Bibliography ==
- Black Butterflies (2023)
