= When the Eagle Hunts =

2002 novel by Simon Scarrow

- First edition cover
- Author: Simon Scarrow
- Language: English
- Series: Eagles of the Empire
- Genre: Historical novel
- Publisher: Headline (UK)
- Publication date: 2002
- Publication place: United Kingdom
- Media type: Print (hardback & paperback)
- ISBN: 978-0-7472-7284-7
- Preceded by: The Eagle's Conquest
- Followed by: The Eagle and the Wolves

When the Eagle Hunts is a 2002 novel by Simon Scarrow, set in 44 AD during the Roman invasion of Britain. It is the third book in the Eagles of the Empire series.

== Plot summary ==
Winter, AD 44: After a series of bloody battles, Camulodunum has fallen to the invading Roman army. While en route to join them, General Aulus Plautius's wife and children are shipwrecked in a storm, and fall into the hands of a dark sect of Druids who now demand the return of their brothers taken prisoner by the Romans.

At the same time, Durotriges tribesmen raid several towns near Camulodunum and the Second Legion under General Vespasian is sent to repel them. They stumble upon a village whose population massacred. Noticing the village has not been entirely looted, the Romans surmise that the raiders intend to return, and so lie in wait to ambush them. Afterwards, a local merchant liaison, Diomedes, secretly executes the survivors of the ambush and sets off on a vendetta to avenge his murdered family.

Centurion Macro and Optio Cato are summoned to General Plautius' tent, and tasked to infiltrate enemy territory and rescue the hostages before they are sacrificed to the Druids' dark gods. Their only assistance is two British guides, Macro's infatuation Boudica and her cousin Prasutagus, who was once a Druid and can guide them to their secret places.

After several false leads, the group raids a Druid lodge, but find only Diomedes impaled on a spit. The merchant informs them of a Druid headquarters in his dying moments. Macro attempts a daring ambush, but is wounded and unable to rescue the prisoners. Time is running out, as the Roman army is approaching their location in its continuing campaign against the Durotriges, and the Druids will execute the hostages before letting them be rescued.

Cato disguises himself as a Briton by painting his nude body with woad, then investigates a secret entry point. Finding it unguarded, he returns and leads a small band of Romans to infiltrate the stronghold and rescue Plautius's family whilst it is under siege. After desperate fighting, the General's wife and children are rescued from being burned alive, and Cato manages to kill the Head Druid but is seriously wounded with a sickle. He awakens days later in a brand-new field hospital in Calleva Atrebatum.

Despite his relief at having his family back, Plautius decides that no special commendations will be given to Macro or Cato, as they only did their duty. Vespasian convinces Plautius to allow him to reward the two officers with special phalerae, and Cato with a promotion to the rank of Centurion.

Meanwhile, Macro is disappointed when Boudica tells him that she is engaged to marry Prasutagus, and even if she was not, she is too much of a Briton to have a relationship with a Roman officer. Earlier in the novel, Macro realizes through his conversations with Boudica that even the "friendly" British tribes, such as the Iceni, are fiercely independent, and might do terrible damage if the Roman occupiers do not treat them with respect.
