= The Observations =

Book by Jane Harris

- First edition
- Author: Jane Harris
- Cover artist: Ghost (design); Jeff Cottenden (photography)
- Language: English
- Publisher: Faber & Faber
- Publication date: 6 Apr 2006
- Publication place: United Kingdom
- Media type: Print
- Pages: 432
- ISBN: 0-571-22335-4

The Observations, the debut novel by British author Jane Harris, was published in 2006 and shortlisted for the Orange Prize for Fiction in 2007. It was Waterstones book of the month and Faber & Faber's lead debut fiction title for spring 2006 (with its biggest ever initial print run for a first book).

== Summary ==
The Observations is set in Scotland in 1863 and narrated by the lively, sharp Bessy Buckley, who leaves her murky past in Glasgow and stumbles into a job as a maid at Castle Haivers, a large house outside Edinburgh.

Arabella, her mistress, encourages Bessy to write her thoughts and experiences in a journal. She also subjects Bessy to odd experiments, but Bessy goes along with them because she is flattered by the attention and quickly grows attached to her mistress.

Things change when Bessy snoops into Arabella's locked desk and discovers the book Arabella has been writing, The Observations, a study of the "habits and nature of the Domestic Class."

Bessy is incensed to read criticisms of herself in the account and also learns of Arabella's affection for one of her predecessors, a girl who died under mysterious circumstances.

Bessy concocts an act of revenge that ends up having consequences far more lasting than she ever envisioned …

== Reception ==
Kirkus Reviews says "Harris’s story, though light on plot, is rich in character, its strength deriving almost wholly from Bessy’s irrepressible and ripe narrative voice. A helter-skelter conclusion combines farce (Arabella escapes confinement and beats with a shovel the pompous cleric responsible for Nora’s downfall), tragedy (another death on the railway line) and moral improvement (Bessy’s virtues recognized), takes a few sideswipes at the publishing business and still leaves the door open for what Bessy might do next." and concludes "Rollicking and engaging. A confident, fresh, roguishly charming first work"

Catherine Taylor writing in The Independent also praises Bessy's narrative voice. "The supreme controller of this sumptuous narrative is Bessy herself, arch manipulator to the end, as she - and Harris - effortlessly show how compelling a rattling good story can be".

Joanna Briscoe, in The Guardian continues the theme, "Jane Harris has pulled off a difficult trick, showing the heart behind the tart with genuine and affecting empathy, cleverly undercutting preconceptions that the character has, at least on the surface, fulfilled. The beleaguered but spirited protagonist's emotions are suppressed, hinted at, and beautifully described in a series of stories within stories built on shifting realities as deception is met with counter-deception. Despite the easy comparisons, this is a true one-off."

== Publication ==
The Observations was published in the UK by Faber and Faber, in the US by Penguin Group, and in Australia/New Zealand by Allen & Unwin. It has been published in the Netherlands, Italy, Denmark, Greece, Spain, Germany, Norway, Poland, France, Portugal, Sweden, Brazil, Israel, Serbia and Montenegro. It is due to be published in Israel, Romania, Croatia, Russia, Turkey. An audiobook version is available, narrated by the author. There is also a Danish audiobook version.
