= An Offer You Can't Refuse (novel) =

2008 novel by Jill Mansell

An Offer You Can’t Refuse
- First edition
- Author: Jill Mansell
- Language: English
- Genre: British literature, romantic comedy
- Published: 2008 (Headline Review)
- Publication place: United Kingdom
- Media type: Print (hardcover, paperback, & e-book)
- Pages: 416 pp (paperback)
- ISBN: 0-755-32816-7
- OCLC: 244352677
- Preceded by: Jill Mansell: Thinking Of You
- Followed by: Rumour Has It

An Offer You Can’t Refuse is a novel by British author Jill Mansell. It was on The Sunday Times' paperback charts for five weeks in 2008. As of 2008, Mansell's novels in their Headline editions around the world had sold over 4 million copies.

== Characters ==
- Lola Malone
- Dougie Tennant

== Release details ==
- 2008, UK, Headline Review (ISBN 0755328167), pub date 7 February 2008, hardback
- 2008, UK, Headline Review (ISBN 9780755328161), pub date 26 June 2008, paperback
- 2008, UK, Headline Review (ISBN 9780755352012), pub date 10 February 2008, e-book
