= The Blood Crows =

2013 novel by Simon Scarrow

- First UK edition cover
- Author: Simon Scarrow
- Language: English
- Series: Eagles of the Empire
- Genre: Historical novel
- Publisher: Headline (UK)
- Publication date: 24 October 2013
- Publication place: United Kingdom
- Media type: Print (hardback & paperback)
- Pages: 400
- ISBN: 978-0-7553-5380-4
- Preceded by: Praetorian
- Followed by: Brothers in Blood

The Blood Crows, published in 2013, is the twelfth volume of the Eagles of the Empire series by Simon Scarrow. It features the return of his main characters, Macro and Cato, to Brittania, after an absence of almost ten years.

== Cover description ==
For nearly ten years, the Roman Empire has fought ceaselessly to strengthen its hold over Britannia. But opposition from native tribes led by the ruthless warrior Caratacus threatens to destroy everything. Prefect Cato and Centurion Macro are summoned by Governor Ostorius to Londinium. Tasked with leading a newly formed cavalry cohort into the heartland of Wales, they must destroy the growing resistance. But with Caratacus hatching increasingly ambitious plans and disorder threatening from within Macro and Cato's own ranks, this final test will push the soldiers to their limits. And if they do not emerge as victors, the Emperor Claudius's rule may be at stake, and the very foundations of the Roman Empire could be shattered irrevocably.
