= Gillespie and I =

2011 novel by Jane Harris

- First edition
- Author: Jane Harris
- Cover artist: Petra Börner
- Language: English
- Publisher: Faber & Faber
- Publication date: 5 May 2011
- Publication place: United Kingdom
- Media type: Print
- Pages: 528
- ISBN: 0-571-27516-8

Gillespie and I, published in 2011, is a novel by British author Jane Harris.

== Summary ==
As she sits in her Bloomsbury home in 1933, assisted by her enigmatic maid Sarah, elderly Harriet Baxter sets out to relate the story of her acquaintance, over four decades previously, with Ned Gillespie, a talented artist who never achieved the fame that she maintains he deserved.

Back in 1888, following the death of her aunt, the young, art-loving Harriet arrives in Glasgow at the time of the International Exhibition. After a chance encounter, she befriends the Gillespie family - wife Annie, daughters Sybil and Rose and mother Elspeth - and soon becomes a fixture in all of their lives. Harriet tries to support Ned's career as it comes under threat from sleazy journalism and Sybil's increasingly worrying behaviour. But then tragedy strikes – leading to a notorious criminal trial – and the promise and certainties of this world all too rapidly disintegrate into mystery and deception.

== Reception ==
The Independent newspaper voted Gillespie and I one of the 50 best reads of the summer 2011 and The Sunday Times newspaper voted it one of the top summer reads for 2011.

Daisy Goodwin in The Sunday Times has described it as, "Like a Hitchcock film, every detail is there for a reason ... It is rare to read a literary novel where the storytelling is as skilful as the writing is fine, but in Gillespie and I, Harris has pulled off the only too rare double whammy – a Booker-worthy novel that I want to read again."

Kirkus Reviews concludes "Harris writes sensitively and in rich detail, whether conjuring up a Glaswegian streetscape or the elements of one of Ned's compositions. The imbroglio that she conjures up for the Gillespies is something of a potboiler, involving white slavery, unlawful carnal knowledge and Satanism. Or perhaps not: as Harriet complains, “It is incredible what the newspapers are able to get away with printing.” The narrative holds up well to the very end, though the reader will have to have the ability to wend his or her way through the leisurely sentences appropriate to the time and place. A fine evocation of a lost era, and without a false note."

Clare Clark in The Guardian compares it with Harris' debut novel: "Gillespie and I, while less strikingly original than The Observations, has much of its pace and verve. Harris is a fine storyteller and controls the twists and turns of her plot well. Like Bessy Buckley, Harriet Baxter is an arch manipulator, and while she has none of Buckley's reckless exuberance, she shares her predecessor's acuity and has a sly and waspish wit". And continues, "Like The Observations, Gillespie and I is, at heart, a book about loneliness and obsessive love. If The Observations drew on Gothic romance and sensation fiction for its inspiration, Gillespie and I follows the tradition of Henry James, using the first-person narrator to explore questions of consciousness and perception. Harriet Baxter is an uncomfortable mixture of superiority and neediness and, while the intensity of her friendship with the Gillespies is oppressive, it is, at least at the start, impossible to fault. Harriet is not a likeable narrator but she is a compelling one.

Carol Birch in The Independent writes, "Harris plays with the reader's expectations and perspectives brilliantly...Multi-layered, dotted with dry black humour and underpinned by a haunting sense of loneliness, this skilfully plotted psychological mystery leaves a few threads dangling, all of them leading back to an old woman living in London in 1933 with two greenfinches in a cage and a mysterious servant/companion called Sarah Whittle, of whom she is afraid. Equally filled with shifting perspectives, this parallel drama draws the book to its quietly nightmarish end.

Peggy Hughes in Scotland on Sunday also praises the novel, "It's tempting to marshal clichés, for this book is a tour de force: taut, unsettling, funny, a story that holds you in its grip and makes you skip ahead but circle back again for more of the same - literary crack cocaine - but Gillespie And I transcends cliché. It has all the tension and documentary detail of Kate Summerscale's The Suspicions Of Mr Whicher; the scathing irony of Jane Austen and in Harriet Baxter a memorable heroine: part Marple, part Barbara from Notes On A Scandal, part something entirely unique, whose personality and story will continue to inhabit the mind of the reader long after all is said and done."

Anthony Cummins in The Daily Telegraph is less enamoured though: "in order to succeed, Gillespie and I must eke suspense from the nagging accumulation of discrepancies that slowly oblige you to view the narrator not as a good Samaritan but as a needy busybody. But – for this reader at least – these discrepancies provoke incredulity rather than curiosity. The phrase “as it happened” (or its variants, “as it transpired” and “it so happened”) is made to gloss over one coincidence too many. I rarely believed Ned would let Harriet into his life"..."The ending, as with any mystery, solves a few of these difficulties. All the same, one hesitates to recommend a 500-page book that can be appreciated only in retrospect."

== Shortlistings/longlistings ==
- Shortlisted for Popular Fiction Book of the Year in Galaxy National Book Awards UK 2011
- Longlisted for the Orange Prize for Fiction (now the Women's Prize) 2012

== Radio adaptation ==
Gillespie and I was adapted into a ten-part radio play in BBC Radio 4's 15 Minute Drama series.

== Publication ==
Gillespie and I was published in the UK by Faber and Faber, in the US by HarperCollins, and in Australia/New Zealand by Allen and Unwin. It was also published in Italy by Neri Pozza Editore, in The Netherlands by De Geus and in Spain by Lumen. An audiobook is available, narrated by Anna Bentinck.
