= Gladiator: Son of Spartacus =

2013 book by Simon Scarrow

- Author: Simon Scarrow
- Language: English
- Series: Gladiator series
- Genre: Young Adult Fiction
- Publisher: Penguin Books (UK); Hyperion Books (USA)
- Publication date: 7 February 2013
- Publication place: United Kingdom
- Pages: 304 pp. (paperback)/ 336 pp. (hardcover)
- ISBN: 978-0-14-133873-6 (paperback); 978-0-14-133872-9 (hardcover)
- Preceded by: Gladiator: Street Fighter
- Followed by: Gladiator: Vengeance

Gladiator: Son of Spartacus is the third book in the Gladiator Series, by Simon Scarrow.

== Plot summary ==
Marcus Cornelius Primus has been freed from slavery, and wants to find and rescue his mother. Meanwhile, his former master Caesar wants him to help defeat the rebellious slaves led by Brixus.

== Style ==
The Gladiator series is intended for young teens and older, with a targeted age group of 11 years old and up. The story is quite clear, fast and without excessive details. The frequent action scenes are described very precisely and graphically.
