= Gladiator: Street Fighter =

2012 book by Simon Scarrow

- Author: Simon Scarrow
- Language: English
- Series: Gladiator series
- Genre: Young Adult Fiction
- Publisher: Penguin Books (UK); Hyperion Books (USA)
- Publication date: 2 February 2012
- Publication place: United Kingdom
- Pages: 352 pp. (paperback/hardcover)
- ISBN: 978-0141328591 (paperback); ISBN 978-0141333649 (hardcover)
- Preceded by: Gladiator: Fight for Freedom
- Followed by: Gladiator: Son of Spartacus

Gladiator: Street Fighter is the second book in the Gladiator Series, by Simon Scarrow.

== Plot summary ==
Marcus Cornelius Primus now works for Caesar.

== Style ==
The Gladiator series is intended for young teens and older. The story is quite clear, fast and without excessive details. The frequent action scenes are described very precisely and graphically.
