= Martinian and Processus =

Christian martyrs

Saints Martinian and Processus
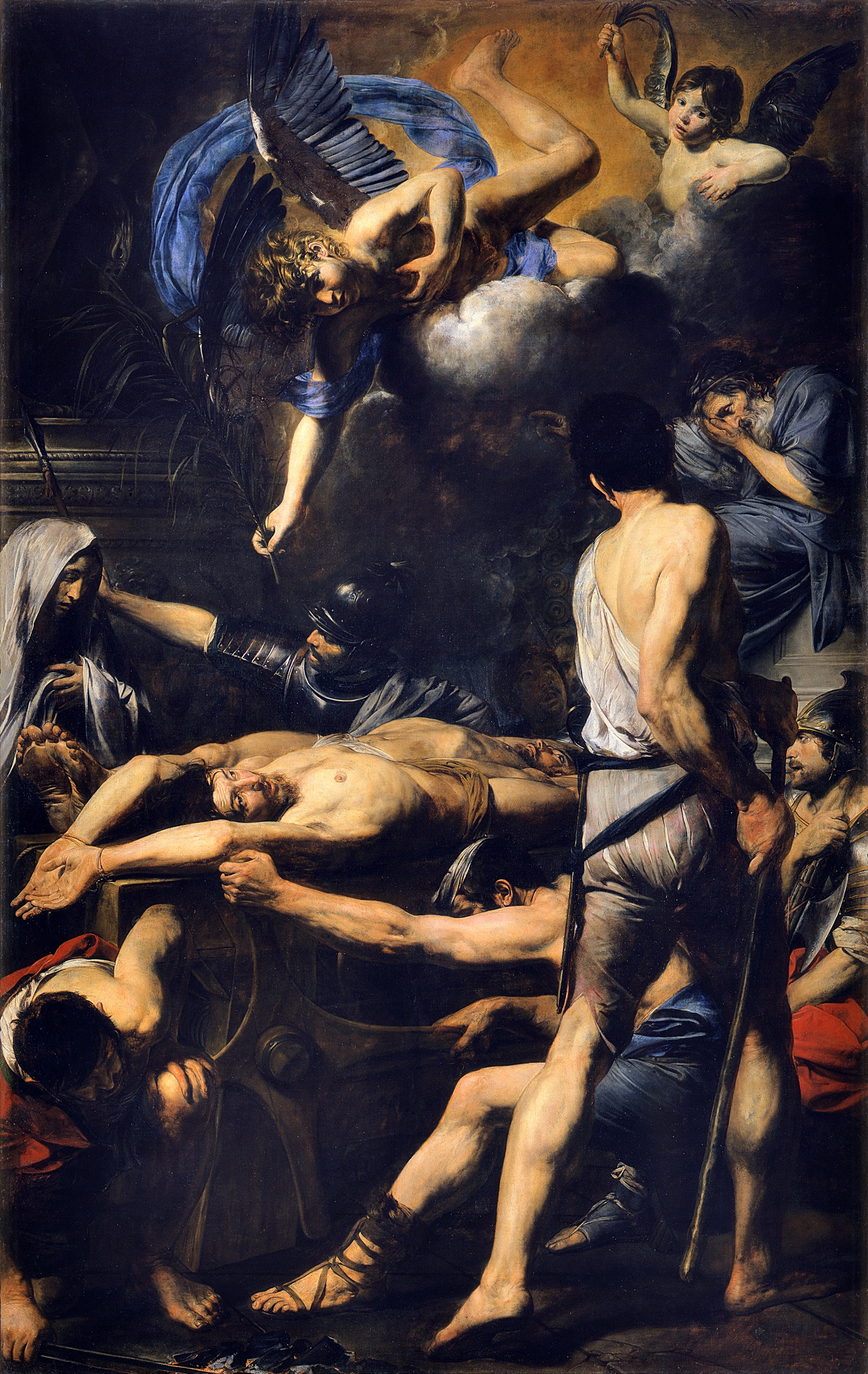
- The Martyrdom of Martinian and Processus. Valentin de Boulogne. 1629.

Martyrs
- Born: c. 30 AD
- Died: c. 67 AD; Rome
- Venerated in: Roman Catholic Church; Eastern Orthodox Church
- Major shrine: St. Peter's Basilica, Rome
- Feast: 11 April (Orthodoxy); 2 July (Both)

Martinian and Processus (Italian: Martiniano and Processo) were Christian martyrs of ancient Rome. Neither the years they lived nor the circumstances of their deaths are known. They are currently buried in St. Peter's Basilica in Rome.

== Legend ==
According to legend, Martinian and Processus were Praetorian Guard soldiers assigned as the warders of Saint Peter and Saint Paul in the Mamertine Prison. The apostles converted their jailers after a spring flowed miraculously in the prison. Peter then baptized them in the miraculous waters. By order of the emperor Nero, the guards were then arrested, tortured, and beheaded. After their martyrdom with Paul, a sympathizer called Lucina buried them in her own cemetery.

== Burial ==
All that is known about Martinian and Processus is that they were originally buried in an apostolic era cemetery along the Via Aurelia on 2 July. The Bollandist Hippolyte Delehaye and the Roman Martyrology state they were buried in some unknown year in the Cemetery of Damasus at the road's second milestone. The Martyrologium Hieronymianum gives their names under July 2. The Berne manuscript of the Martyrology also states that their burial-place was at the second milestone of the Via Aurelia, or at the catacombs of St. Agatha on the Via Aurelia. The old catalogues of the burial places of the Roman martyrs likewise mention the graves of both saints on this road.

== Veneration ==
Martinian and Processus were publicly venerated in Rome from the fourth or perhaps the third century. In the fourth century, a church was built over their tomb. At this church, Gregory the Great preached a homily on their feast day "in which he referred to the presence of their bodies, to the cures of the sick, to the harassment of perjurers, and the cure of demoniacs there." This church no longer exists.

Pope Paschal I (817–824) translated the bones of the two martyrs to a chapel in the old Basilica of St. Peter. They still rest under the altar dedicated to them in the right (south) transept of the present St. Peter's Basilica. In 1605, their relics were placed in a porphyry urn under the altar at St. Peter's, which is flanked by two antique yellow columns. The hemisphere has three roundels with scenes from the life of Paul the Apostle.

The 1969 revision of the General Roman Calendar added a feast of the First Martyrs of the Church of Rome on June 30, immediately after that of Saints Peter and Paul. It also removed the individual feast of these and other early martyrs from the general calendar of the Roman Rite. Nonetheless, Martinian and Processus remain in the Roman Martyrology, the official list of saints recognized by the Catholic Church. Thus, they may still be celebrated with their own Mass on their traditional feast day, 2 July, according to the rules in the present Roman Missal, unless in some locality an obligatory celebration is assigned to that day. Pre-1969 calendars grant these saints only a Commemoration within the Mass of the Visitation of Our Lady.

== Sources ==
- David Hugh Farmer, "The Oxford Dictionary of Saints," Oxford: Clarendon Press, 1978, p. 337.
