= Eagles of the Empire =

Series of historical novels by Simon Scarrow

- 1st edition cover of Under the Eagle, the first book in the series
- Under the Eagle (2000); The Eagle's Conquest (2001); When the Eagle Hunts (2002); The Eagle and the Wolves (2003); The Eagle's Prey (2004); The Eagle's Prophecy (2005); The Eagle in the Sand (2006); Centurion (2007); The Gladiator (2009); The Legion (2010); Praetorian (2011); The Blood Crows (2013); Brothers in Blood (2014); Britannia (2015); Invictus (2016); Day of the Caesars (2017); The Blood of Rome (2018); Traitors of Rome (2019); The Emperor's Exile (2020); The Honour of Rome (2021); Death to the Emperor (2022); Rebellion (2023); Revenge of Rome (2024); Tyrant of Rome (2025); The Sword of Rome (2026)
- Author: Simon Scarrow
- Country: United Kingdom
- Language: English
- Genre: Historical fiction
- Publisher: Headline (UK) & Thomas Dunne Books (USA)
- Published: 2000–present
- Media type: Print (hardcover and paperback), audiobook, e-book
- No. of books: 24
- Website: http://www.catoandmacro.com

Eagles of the Empire is a series of historical military fiction novels written by Simon Scarrow. The series began in July 2000 with the publication of Under the Eagle, and as of November 6, 2025 there have been 24 novels released in the series, with the 25th novel due 2026.

Eagles of the Empire takes place within the Roman Empire, beginning in AD 42 during the reign of Emperor Claudius. The books follow the lives of two officers in the Imperial Roman army, Quintus Licinius Cato and Lucius Cornelius Macro. The first book introduces Cato to the Roman army and then follows the development of the friendship and careers of the two soldiers. The series also features many historical figures and interweaves them into the fictional plots influenced by historical events. The characters Cato and Macro were additionally used in one book of the TimeRiders series, Gates of Rome (2012), where they served as supporting characters when the three protagonists travel back to Ancient Rome. Scarrow allowed his brother Alex to make use of the characters in his own novel.

== Locations ==
The first book, Under the Eagle, concerns the induction of Cato, his transition from imperial slave to optio (junior officer) and the lifelong friendship he forges with Centurion Macro.

The following four books are set in Britain, between the years AD 42 and 44 - detailing the Roman subjugation of the province alongside court intrigue that often leaves the protagonists in receipt of contempt from the Roman political class.

The sixth book, The Eagle's Prophecy, opens with the two on leave in the city of Rome and detailed to carry out a pursuit of pirates operating in the Mediterranean.

The seventh and eighth books, The Eagle in the Sand and Centurion, take place in the Roman Empire's eastern provinces, Judaea and Palmyra respectively. While returning to Rome from Palmyra, the protagonists are shipwrecked on the island of Crete in The Gladiator, which leads to them being sent to Egypt in the tenth novel, The Legion. The eleventh novel, Praetorian, is set in Rome, whilst the subsequent three books (The Blood Crows, Brothers in Blood and Britannia, all feature Macro and Cato's return to Britain.

The series, in its entirety, documents Macro and Cato's attempts to live a soldier's simple life. However their effectiveness as soldiers and Cato's former connections to the Imperial Court make this difficult. Through association with Cato, Macro also finds himself the object of the upper classes' intrigue and struggles for supremacy. The series also features Vespasian and Vitellius as supporting characters, during the formative years of their careers, and foreshadowing their future rivalry for the Imperial throne.

== Novels ==
#	Novel	Year of publication	Location	Year set	Historical significance
1	Under the Eagle	2000	Germania & Southern Britannia	AD 42 - 43	Invasion of Britannia
2	The Eagle's Conquest	2001	South East Britannia	AD 43	Battle of the Medway
3	When the Eagle Hunts	2002	South West Britannia	AD 44	Invasion of Britannia
4	The Eagle and the Wolves	2003	Southern Britannia	AD 44	Annexation of the Atrebates (Invasion of Britannia)
5	The Eagle's Prey	2004	Britannia	AD 44	Invasion of Britannia
6	The Eagle's Prophecy	2005	Rome & Ravenna/The Adriatic Sea	AD 45	
7	The Eagle in the Sand	2006	Judaea	AD 46	Influenced by the crucifixion of Jesus
8	Centurion	2008	Syria/Parthia	AD 46	Annexation of Palmyra into Syria & the Roman–Parthian Wars
9	The Gladiator	2009	Crete	AD 48 - 49	
10	The Legion	2010	Aegyptus	AD 49	
	Blood Debt	2009			
11	Praetorian	2011	Ostia & Rome	AD 51	Plots of assassination of Claudius
12	The Blood Crows	2013	Wales, Britannia	AD 51	Invasion of Britannia
13	Brothers in Blood	2014	Wales, Britannia	AD 51	Caratacus' last battle & Capture of Caratacus
14	Britannia	2015	North Wales, Britannia	AD 52	Battle of Mona (Invasion of Britannia)
15	Invictus	2016	Hispania	AD 54	Death of Claudius
16	Day of the Caesars	2017	Rome and Capri	AD 54	Nero succeeds as the 5th Roman Emperor
17	The Blood of Rome	2018	Armenia	AD 55	The Roman–Parthian Wars
18	Traitors of Rome	2019	Syria	AD 56	Invasion of Armenia; the Roman–Parthian Wars
19	The Emperor's Exile	2020	Rome & Sardinia	AD 57	
20	The Honour of Rome	2021	Britannia	AD 59	Invasion of Britannia
21	Death to the Emperor	2022	Britannia	AD 60	Boudican revolt
22	Rebellion	2023	Britannia	AD 60	Boudican revolt
23	Revenge of Rome	2024	Britannia	AD 61	Boudican revolt
24	Tyrant of Rome	2025	Rome	AD 62	
25	The Sword Rome	2026	Euxine Sea	AD 64	

== Main characters ==
=== Lucius Cornelius Macro ===
Macro, a veteran with 16 years service (as of the first novel's opening) has recently been appointed to the Centurionate. He is the epitome of a good soldier: dependable in a fight and does not question any orders given to him by a senior officer. In Under the Eagle he is the centurion of the Sixth Century, of the Fourth Cohort, of the Second Augustan Legion. By the time of The Eagle in the Sand he has risen to become the acting prefect in charge of Fort Bushir in Judaea. In The Legion Cato and Macro join a legion in Egypt, with Macro receiving a temporary promotion to Primus pilus (senior centurion).

Macro has been close friends with Cato since Cato saved his life in the first book. This bond deepens when Macro confesses that he is illiterate and asks Cato's help in learning to read, and so maintain his position as an officer.

Macro’s approximate age, based on his previous service, years traveling with Cato and his joining age as revealed in a short story at the end of Centurion (16 when he joined after killing a gang leader) is 48 at the time of the 20th book.

=== Quintus Licinius Cato ===
Cato is the son of an Imperial Freedman (former slave) in the direct service of Emperor Claudius. Having been born a slave and the property of the state, he was given an opportunity by the Emperor as a favour to Cato's late father to enlist in the legions and be given his freedom. Cato has lived a relatively luxurious life as a slave within the Imperial palace in comparison with the rank and file of the legions, and after accepting the Emperor's offer he joins the Second Augustan as Macro's Optio.

In the first novel, he is only sixteen years of age, tall and gawky, and so weak-looking that many of the officers, including Macro, place bets on how long it will be before he quits or is killed. The Emperor grants Cato an immediate commission as a Centurion, but because of his age Vespasian makes him an optio as a compromise, which causes the officers and his fellow recruits to resent him further. He is, however, extremely determined and proves the officers wrong throughout the series. Cato attains the rank of Centurion at the end of When the Eagle Hunts and during the events of Centurion he is promoted to acting prefect of the Second Illyrian. Halfway through The Gladiator Cato is promoted to the rank of tribune for his mission to Egypt, temporarily outranking Macro, but at the end of the book he is awarded a temporary rank of prefect. In The Legion Cato joins a legion in Egypt and receives a temporary promotion to Senior Tribune.

Because of his palace upbringing, Cato is well-read, often portrayed as more cerebral and forward-thinking than Macro. Macro is dismissive of this at first but eventually comes to respect Cato's talent for thinking ahead and seeing the big picture.

=== Julia Sempronia ===
First appears in Centurion. Daughter of Senator Sempronius, the Emperor's ambassador to the court of Palmyra. Both Romans are trapped in the citadel while it is under siege by an army led by one of the King's rebellious sons. Refusing to be put aside as a "helpless woman," Julia helps to nurse the casualties in the citadel's makeshift field hospital. She meets Cato there, and becomes his lover and accepts his proposal of marriage. While traveling back to Rome, she and her father are shipwrecked on Crete with Macro and Cato, where she is captured by the rebel leader Ajax, but manages to escape. Cato eventually learns of her death from an undisclosed illness in Britannia. Cato learns of Julia's unfaithfulness upon his return to Rome in Invictus, however in "Days of the Caesars" she is revealed to have been faithful by Domitia (Vespasian's wife), using her supposed infidelity as a cover to raise funds on behalf of Britannicus. However, Tribune Cristus (the man she supposedly had an affair with), gives an ambiguous answer as to whether they had an affair or not, when Cato confronts him at the end of the book, before he commits suicide.

=== Lavinia ===
Lavinia appears in the first two books and is the lover of both Cato and Vitellius. She is a slave-girl who is owned by Flavia, Vespasian's wife. In The Eagle's Conquest she betrays Cato and unwittingly helps Vitellius try to assassinate the Emperor. However, when the plot fails Vitellius kills both her and the assassin to cover himself.

=== Ajax ===
First appears in The Eagle's Prophecy as the son of the Greek pirate leader Telemachus. He is captured by Macro and Cato and gives them and Vespasian the hiding place of the pirates and is used as a bargaining counter to make Telemachus surrender and hand over the Sibylline Scrolls to Vespasian. His father is crucified and Ajax is sold into slavery. He becomes a professional Secutor gladiator and is bought by a wealthy family on Crete, used both as a fighter and a sex slave by the household's wife. Freed when a massive earthquake devastates the island in The Gladiator, he leads an army of other escaped slaves and captures Macro and Julia but is defeated by Cato and his troops. However, he escapes in the end and returns in The Legion to further defy Cato and Macro by joining forces with the Nubians. Escaping capture several times, he is finally cornered by Macro and Cato in an Egyptian marsh and devoured by a crocodile.

=== Historical figures ===
- Vespasian: Legate of the Second Legion and Macro and Cato's commander in the first five books during the Roman conquest of Britain. Vespasian also appears in The Eagle's Prophecy as the Prefect of the naval fleet. Vespasian is often fighting in the front line with his men but is consistently at odds with his tribune Vitellius who threatens him with the knowledge that Vespasian's wife Flavia is a member of the dissident group who are conspiring to overthrow the Emperor.
- Flavia Domitilla: Vespasian's wife, who, he is chagrined to learn, is a member of the "Liberators," a group of conspirators plotting Claudius's assassination; however in Day of the Caesars, the conspirators have changed their target to Nero, hoping to allow Britannicus to succeed his father. She also reveals that Julia was faithful to Cato. She kills herself when the coup fails.
- Titus: Vespasian's son, who appears as an infant in the first two novels.
- Vitellius: An imperial spy with disturbing ambition who attempts to steal Caesar's pay chest in Under the Eagle and assassinate the Emperor during The Eagle's Conquest, but is thwarted by Macro and Cato both times. In The Eagle's Prophecy he is the prefect of the naval fleet but is replaced by Vespasian who leaves him to die at one point. However Vitellius survives with the Emperor and Narcissus unaware of his attempted treason. At the end of the novel, he has also seen a snippet from the Sibylline prophecies captured from the pirates which convinces him that he is destined to become emperor.
- Narcissus: Claudius's Chief Secretary and effectively Prime Minister of the whole Empire. He recruits Macro and Cato for "special" tasks around the Empire, promising them rich rewards for success, but making it clear that their lives are of little value to him or the Empire.
- Claudius: Emperor of Rome, portrayed in The Eagle's Conquest and Praetorian as a forgetful, half-witted buffoon.
- Miriam, mother of Jehoshua, a crucified pacifist; appears in The Eagle in the Sand
- Caratacus: leader of the rebellious tribes of Britain.
- Boudicca: a young British noblewoman, with whom Macro becomes smitten in the third novel, When the Eagle Hunts.
- Agrippina the Younger: the Emperor's wife and mother of Nero; appears in Praetorian;
- Nero: Claudius's stepson; appears in Praetorian;
- Britannicus: Claudius's son; appears in Praetorian;
- Sextus Afranius Burrus: Praetorian Centurion, later prefect; appears in Praetorian;
- Gaius Ofonius Tigellinus: appears in Praetorian.
- Marcus Antonius Pallas: appears in Praetorian.
- Marcus Salvius Otho: appears in Brothers in Blood as a tribune

== Publishing history ==
#	Title	Pages	Chapters	Audio	UK Release
1	Under The Eagle	256	40	12h 5m	July 6, 2000
2	The Eagle's Conquest	434	54	13h 36m	August 2, 2001
3	When the Eagle Hunts	448	35	12h 3m	August 5, 2002
4	The Eagle and the Wolves	432	41	12h 48m	August, 2003
5	The Eagle's Prey	480	42	13h 36m	July 5, 2004
6	The Eagle's Prophecy	501	45	13h 49m	September, 2005
7	The Eagle in the Sand	516	34	11h 33m	August 7, 2006
8	Centurion	352	32	12h 27m	August 7, 2008
9	The Gladiator	384	33	13h 31m	August 6, 2009
10	The Legion	384	36	13h 19m	November 11, 2010
11	Praetorian	368	30	12h 16m	November 10, 2011
12	The Blood Crows	384	37	13h 54m	October 24, 2013
13	Brothers in Blood	384	36	13h 53m	October 9, 2014
14	Britannia	352	32	12h 10m	November 19, 2015
15	Invictus	384	32	12h 41m	November 17, 2016
16	Day of the Caesars	367	41	12h 3m	November 16, 2017
17	The Blood of Rome	480	38	13h 22m	November 15, 2018
18	Traitors of Rome	464	32	12h 47m	November 12, 2019
19	The Emperor's Exile	469	36	12h 00m	November 12, 2020
20	The Honour of Rome	448	36	12h 28m	November 11, 2021
21	Death to the Emperor	473	33	13h 34m	November 10, 2022
22	Rebellion	425	27	12h 11m	November 9, 2023
23	Revenge of Rome	429	34	12h 40m	October 24, 2024
24	Tyrant of Rome	396	33	12h 30m	November 6, 2025
25	TBC	Forthcoming			TBC
Total		10010	869	307h 16m	

=== Overview ===
Books in the Eagles of the Empire series are first published in hardcover and are later rereleased as paperback editions by Headline publishers. In the US the first six books, the last being The Eagle's Prophecy, were published by Thomas Dunne publishers (Macmillan publishers) Since 2011 and the release of Praetorian each of the books has also been released as an audiobook. The series has also been translated into several other languages. The page totals given to the right are for the UK first edition, hardcovers.

=== Sales ===
As of 12 March 2018 Scarrow has sold more than 4 million copies of the books within Eagles of the Empire in English alone.

=== Cover illustrations ===
Under the Eagle, the first in the series, has had 5 different covers, the initial cover being used only for the 1st edition hardcover. It was then updated on release of the paperback edition. On release of the second novel, The Eagle's Conquest, the third version of the cover was used. This remained until Scarrow started refraining from using 'Eagle' in the titles of the novels, with the first release after this being Centurion in 2008, resulting in another rebrand. The current branding was updated with the release of The Blood Crows in 2013.

=== Novel titles ===
The novels since Under the Eagle first being published have contained the word 'Eagle' in the title. However since the 8th book, Centurion, the author has refrained from using 'Eagle'. The reason is unknown but some speculate that it has been done in effort to make the books accessible to a wider audience, and it also explains the change in cover illustrations.

=== Future novels ===
Scarrow has also stated that whilst initially he planned to write only around ten novels in the series this has since changed to 25. Scarrow also hinted at two potential endings for Eagles of the Empire. One being Cato and Macro facing each other on opposite sides of a battle during the Year of four Emperors, AD 69 resulting in the death of one of them. The other being their retirement in AD 69 in Pompeii. This has significance due to the supporting and recurring characters through the series, Vespasian becoming Emperor at the end of that year.
