= The Legion (novel) =

2010 novel by Simon Scarrow

- First UK edition cover
- Author: Simon Scarrow
- Language: English
- Series: Eagles of the Empire
- Genre: Historical novel
- Publisher: Headline (UK)
- Publication date: 2010
- Publication place: United Kingdom
- Media type: Print (Hardback & Paperback)
- Pages: 384
- ISBN: 978-0-7553-5376-7
- Preceded by: The Gladiator
- Followed by: Praetorian

The Legion is a 2010 novel (ISBN 0-7553-5374-9) by Simon Scarrow, the tenth book in the Eagles of the Empire series, where we see the return of Macro and Cato, this time trouble is brewing in Egypt. At the start Macro and Cato are continuing their search for the rebel leader Ajax who has now retreated to Egypt. Meanwhile trouble brews between a bordering nation and the two officers must choose between revenge or saving the province.
