= Gladiator (novel series) =

Novel series by Simon Scarrow

First UK editions (Penguin Books)

Gladiator is a series of historical fiction novels for young adults by Simon Scarrow set in ancient Rome in the years before the fall of the Roman Republic. The books tell the story of Marcus Cornelius Primus, a young gladiator and street fighter caught up in the dramatic events unfolding as Rome descends into civil war and chaos.

== Titles in series ==
- Gladiator: Fight for Freedom
- Gladiator: Street Fighter
- Gladiator: Son of Spartacus
- Gladiator: Vengeance
