= Wellington and Napoleon Quartet =

Series of historical novels by Simon Scarrow

The Wellington and Napoleon Quartet is a historical fiction series of novels by British author Simon Scarrow, that is set in primarily during the time of the French Revolution and the Napoleonic Wars. The series tells the stories of Napoleon Bonaparte and Arthur Wellesley from their births to the climax of their respective military careers, the Battle of Waterloo.

The series consists of four novels: Young Bloods (2006), The Generals (2007), Fire and Sword (2009), and The Fields of Death (2010).
