= Chukwuebuka Ibeh =

Nigerian writer

- Born: 2000 (age 25–26); Port Harcourt
- Citizenship: Nigerian
- Education: Washington University in St. Louis
- Occupation: Writer Professor
- Employer: Bucknell University
- Known for: Literature
- Notable work: Blessings (novel)

Chukwuebuka Ibeh (born 2000) is a Nigerian writer of Igbo origin from Port Harcourt. His debut novel, Blessings, was published in 2024 by Penguin Random House under its Viking imprint. His work explores LGBT+ identity in Nigeria and examines the impact of the Same Sex Marriage (Prohibition) Act on the lives of queer Nigerians.

== Early life and education ==
Ibeh was born in Port Harcourt, Rivers State before moving to the United States. There, he studied and taught creative writing at Washington University in St. Louis before becoming an assistant professor at Bucknell University.

== Personal life ==
Blessings is a semi-autobiographical novel that draws on Ibeh's experiences growing up in a Christian boarding school, where he felt safer remaining closeted about his sexuality.

== Career ==
His writing has appeared in numerous publications, including McSweeney's, New England Review, and Lolwe. In 2023, he was selected as a resident artist at the Spruceton Inn Artist Residency. In 2019, he was named one of the most promising new voices in Nigerian literature by Electric Literature. Ibeh attended a writing workshop led by Chimamanda Ngozi Adichie as a young writer. In 2026, he facilitated a literature masterclass for aspiring writers in Enugu, where he shared insights on creative writing, storytelling, and the publishing process.

Ibeh began writing his debut LGBT+ novel, Blessings, on scraps of paper before later typing the manuscript into a computer. The novel took him two years to complete after he wrote the first chapter in 2020. He has cited literary figures such as Chinua Achebe, Cyprian Ekwensi, Buchi Emecheta, Chimamanda Ngozi Adichie, Raymond Carver, and Jhumpa Lahiri as important influences on his writing. In his early career, he worked as a staff writer on the Nigerian fashion and lifestyle blog BellaNaija.

In 2025, Electric Literature listed him among seven novelists in conversation with their literary ancestors, comparing Blessings to Nervous Conditions by Tsitsi Dangarembga.

== Honors and awards ==
- 2024 Wilbur Smith Prize for Blessings - Shortlist
- 2021 J.F. Powers Prize for Fiction - Runner up
- 2020 Morland Foundation Scholarship - Finalist
- 2019 Gerald Kraak Award - Finalist

== Bibliography ==
=== Novels ===
—— (2024). Blessings: A Novel. New York: Viking Press. ISBN 9780385550659.
