= Jane Harris (writer) =

British writer

Jane Harris (born 1961) is a British writer of fiction and screenplays. Her novels have been published in over 20 territories worldwide and translated into many different languages (see The Observations and Gillespie and I). Her most recent work is the novel Sugar Money which was shortlisted for several literary prizes.

Harris was nominated for the British Book Awards Newcomer of the Year (2007) and the Southbank Show/Times Breakthrough Award (2007), and was chosen as a Waterstones Author of the Future, also in 2007.

== Early life ==
Harris was born in Belfast, Northern Ireland, and spent her early childhood there before her parents moved in 1965 to Glasgow, Scotland. Upon leaving school, she studied English Literature and Drama at the University of Glasgow, then trained as an actress at the East 15 Acting School in London. At the end of the course, in order to obtain an Equity card from the actor's union, she formed a comedy trio called the Gumdrops, which was unsuccessful.

After a few years of different jobs, such as a dishwasher, a waitress, a chambermaid and an English language teacher, began writing short stories while confined to her bed in Portugal with flu.

On her return to Glasgow, several of her short stories were published in anthologies. In the early 1990s, she was a regular panelist on STV's Scottish Books program.

She went on to obtain a Master's in Creative Writing at the University of East Anglia, and then completed a PhD at the same university.

She lists her literary influences as Charles Dickens, Jane Austen, Muriel Spark, Henry James, Robert Louis Stevenson, Anne Tyler and Carol Shields.

Harris was married to film and television director Tom Shankland but the couple divorced in 2020.

== Career ==
After UEA, she completed a two-year stint as the Arts Council of Great Britain Writer-in-Residence at HM Prison Durham (1992–4). Following this, Harris worked as both a script and novel reader, and a script editor for film companies and The Literary Consultancy. She also taught creative writing for many years, principally at the University of East Anglia.

Harris's 2006 debut, The Observations, was shortlisted for the Orange Prize for Fiction 2007. It was Waterstones book of the month and Faber & Faber's lead debut fiction title for spring 2006 (with its biggest ever initial print run for a first book). It was followed in 2011 by Gillespie and I, then in 2017 by Sugar Money.

Sugar Money was shortlisted for the Walter Scott Prize, The Wilbur Smith Adventure Writing Prize and the Historical Writers Association (HWA) Gold Crown. The Sunday Express wrote: "Pitches you headfirst into this outstanding, heartbreaking story of siblings, slavery and the savagery of the colonial past." A review in The Irish Times wrote "Through masterful detail, Harris shows the dehumanisation of the brothers and their fellow slaves . . . Beautifully cadenced."

== Awards and shortlistings ==
=== The Observations ===
- Shortlisted for Saltire Society Literary Awards First Book of the Year 2006
- Waterstones Book of the Month (April 2006)
- Won the Book of the Month First Fiction Prize (2007)
- Shortlisted for the Orange Prize for Fiction (2007)
- Shortlisted for a French Prix du Premier Roman Etranger award in 2009
- Selected as one of Richard and Judy's 100 Best Books of the Decade in 2011.

=== Gillespie and I ===
- Shortlisted for Popular Fiction Book of the Year in Galaxy National Book Awards UK (2011)
- The Independent newspaper voted it one of the 50 best reads for the summer (2011)
- Longlisted for the Orange Prize for Fiction (2012)

=== Sugar Money ===
- Shortlisted for the Historical Writers Association Gold Crown Prize (2018)
- Shortlisted for the Walter Scott Prize (2018)
- Shortlisted for the Wilbur Smith Adventure Writing Prize (2018)

== Short stories ==
Her short stories have received a number of prizes including the Penguin/Observer Newspaper Short Story Award, 1993. She was awarded an Arts Council writer's grant in 2000.

Harris has been published in a wide variety of anthologies and literary magazines including New Writing 3, edited by Andrew Motion and Candice Rodd, and in several volumes of New Writing Scotland.

Her short story "Ascension" was commissioned for BBC Radio 3's The Verb. Harris read the story when it was broadcast live from the Radio Theatre at Broadcasting House on 6 May 2011.

== Screenplays ==
Harris has written a number of award-winning short films, culminating in 2000 when Bait (funded by Film4 Productions) was BAFTA-nominated. The film won the Kodak Award and Best Short at the Newport Film Festival in the US.

In 2001, Going Down (funded by Working Title Films) was also nominated for a BAFTA and won prizes for Best Drama at the BBC Short Film Festival, Best Short at the Angers Film Festival and was runner-up in the Turner Classic Movie Awards.

Harris was shortlisted in 1999 and 2000 for the BBC's Dennis Potter Awards.

== Radio ==
- "Ascension 1979", a specially commissioned short story, was read by Harris live on BBC Radio 3's The Verb in May 2011.
- The Observations was adapted by Chris Dolan and dramatised on BBC Radio 4 Woman's Hour in April 2007.
- Gillespie and I was adapted by Chris Dolan and dramatized on BBC Radio 4 in October 2013.
