= Douglas Jackson (author) =

Scottish novelist

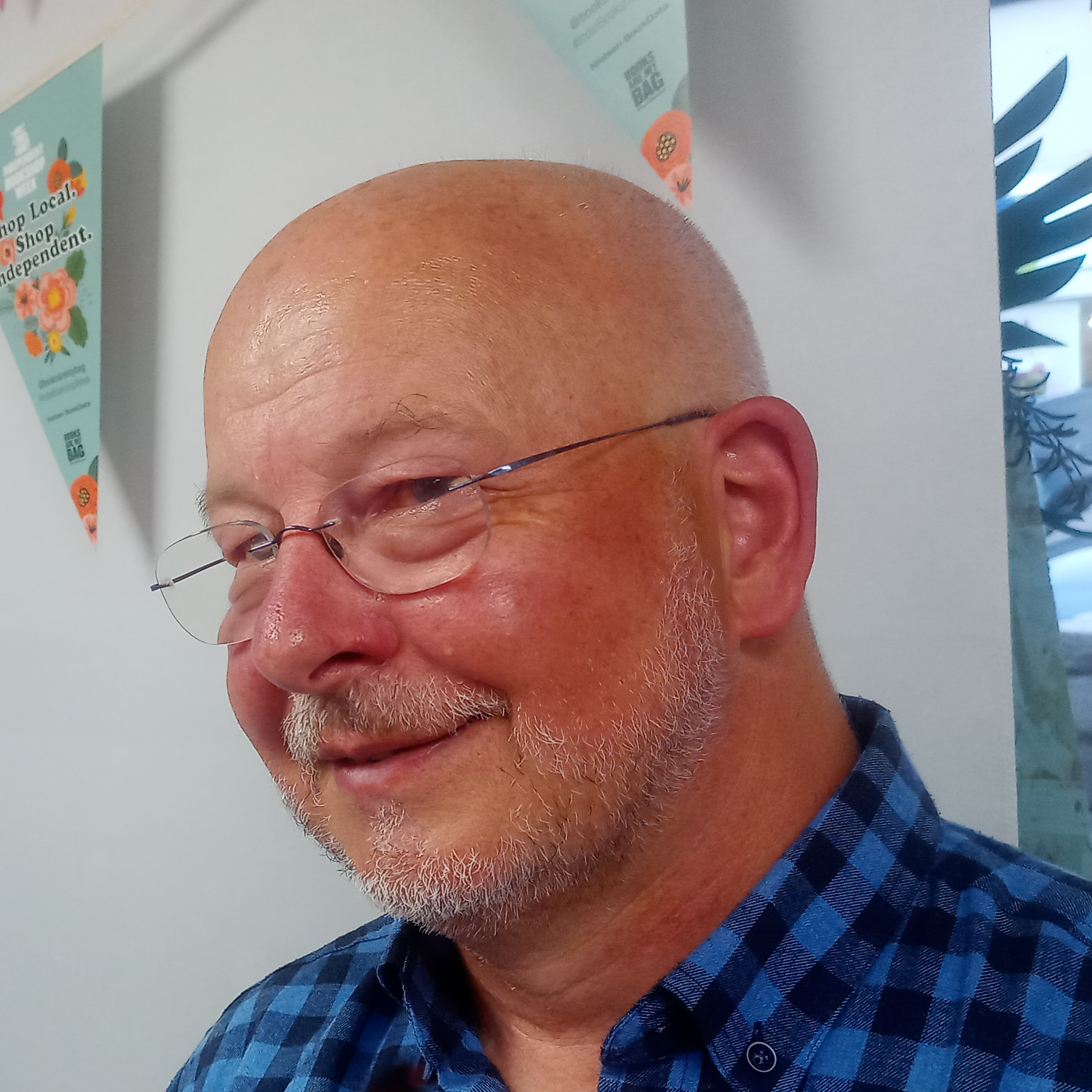
- in 2023 in Jedburgh
- Born: Jedburgh
- Occupations: Writer; novelist; historian; biographer
- Writing career
- Pen name: Douglas Jackson, James Douglas
- Genres: Non-fiction, history, novels
- Website: www.douglas-jackson.net

Douglas Jackson (born 1956) is a Scottish novelist. He is the author of various historical novels and mystery thrillers.

== Early life ==
Jackson was born in the town of Jedburgh in the Scottish Borders and now lives in Stirling. Originally a journalist by profession on local and national newspapers for 36 years, Jackson rose to become Assistant Editor of The Scotsman, before leaving in 2009 to be a full-time writer.

== Writing career ==
As of January 2015, Jackson has published twelve novels, eight under the name Douglas Jackson and four under the pen name James Douglas. Jackson's first novel was Caligula (2008), the story of a young slave and animal trainer, Rufus, who becomes keeper of the famously mad Emperor's elephant, Bersheba. Rufus and his friend, the famous gladiator, Cupido, struggle to stay alive in the complex web of plot and counter plot in Caligula's court on the Palatine Hill. This was followed in 2009 by Claudius, which continues Rufus's story as he accompanies another emperor on the invasion of Britain in 43 AD. In 2010, Hero of Rome, the first of a new series featuring the tribune Gaius Valerius Verrens, was published, followed on 18 August 2011, by Defender of Rome. The third, Avenger of Rome was published in 2012, followed by Sword of Rome (2013), Enemy of Rome (2014) and Scourge of Rome (2015). Jackson's first series, The Doomsday Testament (James Douglas), follows art recovery expert Jamie Saintclair as he tries to unravel the mystery behind his soldier grandfather's final mission of World War Two, a quest which brings him within a fingertip of the most famous painting still missing from the war, and a buried secret that could destroy the world or safeguard the future of mankind. Douglas Jackson's books are available as ebooks.

As of 2024, he wrote four books around Warsaw Chief Investigator Jan Kalisz, forced to work with German occupiers while also gathering information for Polish resistance.

== Bibliography ==
=== Rufus ===
- Caligula (2008)
- Claudius (2009)

=== Gaius Valerius Verrens ===
- Hero of Rome (2010)
- Defender of Rome (2011)
- Avenger of Rome (2012)
- Sword of Rome (2013)
- Enemy of Rome (2014)
- Scourge of Rome (2015)
- Saviour of Rome (2016)
- Glory of Rome (2017)
- Hammer of Rome (2018)

=== Marcus Flavius Victor ===
- The Wall (2022)
- The Barbarian (2023)

=== Glen Savage mystery ===
- War Games (2014)
- Brothers in Arms (2019)

=== Jan Kalisz series ===
- Blood Roses (2019)

=== Jamie Saintclaire (as James Douglas) ===
- The Doomsday Testament (2011)
- The Isis Covenant (2012)
- The Excalibur Codex (2013)
- The Samurai Inheritance (2014)
