= Simon Scarrow =

British fiction writer

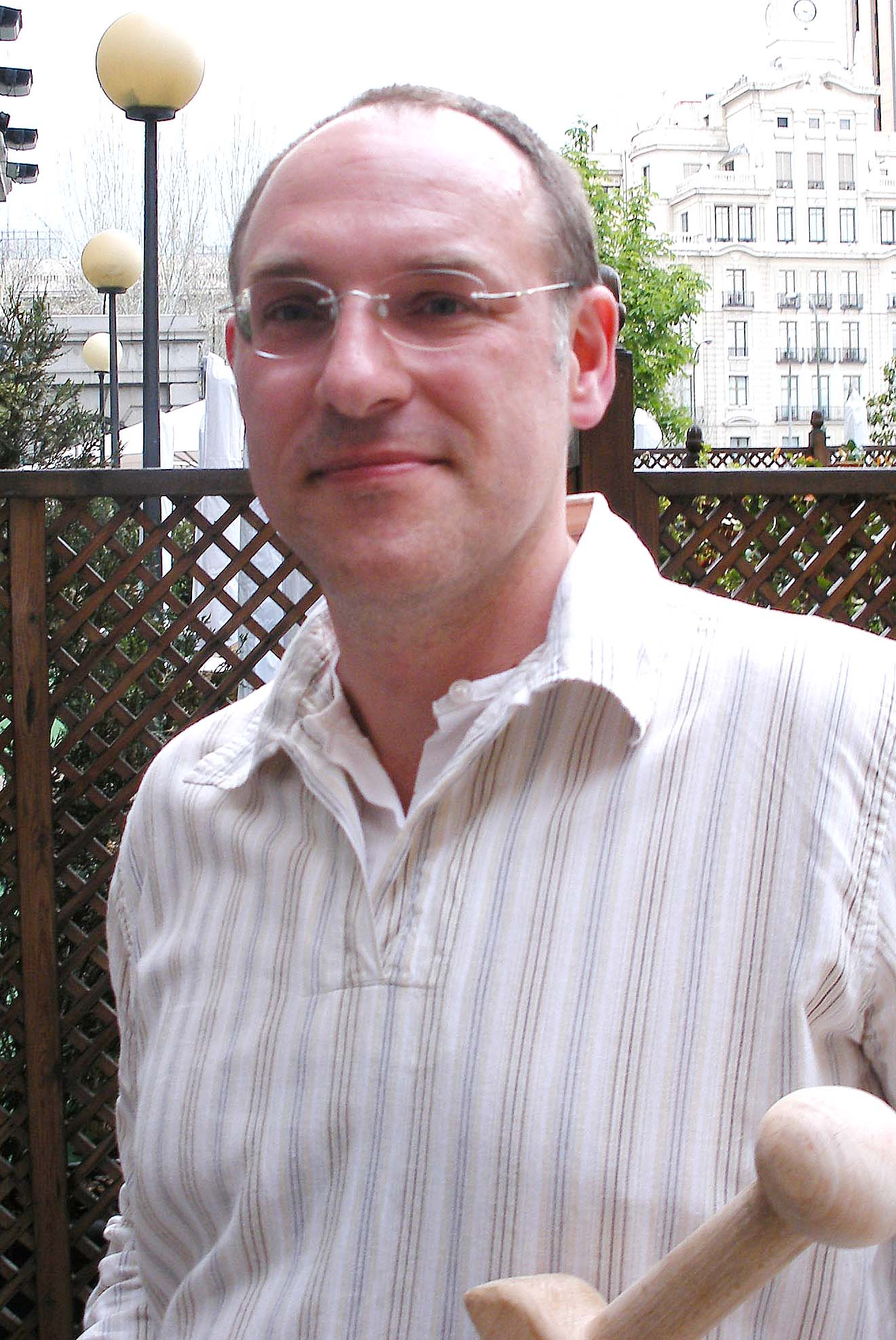
- Scarrow in 2007
- Born: 3 October 1962 (age 64) near Lagos, Nigeria
- Occupation: Novelist
- Spouse: Louise Richmond
- Children: 2 sons and one step-son
- Relatives: Alex Scarrow
- Writing career
- Genre: Historical fiction
- Notable works: Eagles of the Empire series, Revolution series
- Website: www.simonscarrow.co.uk

Simon Scarrow (born 3 October 1962) is a British writer. Scarrow completed a master's degree at the University of East Anglia after working at the Inland Revenue, and then went into teaching as a lecturer, firstly at East Norfolk Sixth Form College, then at City College Norwich.

He is best known for his Eagles of the Empire series of Roman military fiction set in the territories of the Roman Empire, covering the second invasion of Britain and the subsequent prolonged campaign undertaken by the rump of the Julio-Claudian dynasty. As of 2025, there are 23 books in the series; the latest, Tyrant of Rome, was published in 2025.

He has written another series, Revolution, focussing on Wellington and Napoleon, the first title of which, Young Bloods, was published in 2006. The second volume, The Generals, was published on 31 May 2007 and the third volume, Fire and Sword, in January 2009. The fourth and final novel of the series was published in June 2010 and is called The Fields of Death. He began publishing a new series in 2011, entitled Gladiator.

In 2021, Scarrow authored an audiovisual walking tour for the Roman Colosseum entitled Blood and Sand on the BARDEUM mobile app.

== Books ==
Asked by the Edinburgh Book Review about the inspiration behind his interest in the Roman era, Scarrow said, "Firstly, great Latin teachers – Gordon Rodway and then Reg Nash, who inspired a love of the language and more enduringly a fascination with Roman history and culture. Secondly, when I was growing up in the seventies swords and sandals epics seemed to be on the TV regularly. Not to mention the brilliant I, Claudius".

Scarrow cites the inspiration for his 'earthy' characters as being from his time in the Officer Training Corps.

=== Eagles of the Empire series ===
The Eagles of the Empire series has two main protagonists, Quintus Licinius Cato and Lucius Cornelius Macro, who are both Roman soldiers. Macro, a veteran with nearly 15 years' service (at the start of the first novel) in the Roman Army, has recently been appointed to the Centurionate. Cato is in his teens, grew up in the Imperial Palace as a slave, and at the start of the series joins the Eagles as Macro's Optio. The first book starts in 42 AD. The books cover the experiences of the two soldiers, initially as experienced centurion and new optio, in battles in Germania and the invasion of Britain by Claudius as part of the Legio II Augusta. The 6th book, The Eagle's Prophecy, has them serving as part of the Imperial Navy east of Italy. The 7th and 8th put them in Rome's eastern provinces as agents of the Emperor's secretary Tiberius Claudius Narcissus. The 9th sees them shipwrecked on the island of Crete, fighting against a full-scale uprising. The 11th is set in Rome with the leads hoping to save the emperor from the shady Liberators. The Blood Crows is set once again in Britannia. The two protagonists are faced with defeating tribal rebels.

1. Under the Eagle (2000)
2. The Eagle's Conquest (2001)
3. When the Eagle Hunts (2002)
4. The Eagle and the Wolves (2003)
5. The Eagle's Prey (2004)
6. The Eagle's Prophecy (2005)
7. The Eagle in the Sand (2006)
8. Centurion (2007)
9. The Gladiator (2009)
10. The Legion (2010)
  - Blood Debt (2009, short story)
11. Praetorian (2011)
12. The Blood Crows (2013)
13. Brothers in Blood (2014)
14. Britannia (2015)
15. Invictus (2016)
16. Day of the Caesars (2017)
17. The Blood of Rome (2018)
18. Traitors of Rome (2019)
19. The Emperor's Exile (2020)
20. The Honour of Rome (2021)
21. Death to the Emperor (2022)
22. Rebellion (2023)
23. Revenge of Rome (2024)
24. Tyrant of Rome (2025)
25. The Sword of Rome (2026)

=== Revolution series ===
The Revolution Quartet centres upon the lives of Napoleon Bonaparte and Arthur Wellesley, later the Duke of Wellington. The first book in the quartet starts in 1769, and follows the two young men through their youth and on to their military careers.

1. Young Bloods (2006)
2. The Generals (2007)
3. Fire and Sword (2009)
4. The Fields of Death (2010)

=== Gladiator series ===
The Gladiator series is aimed at the young adult audience, unlike his Eagle series.

1. Gladiator: Fight for Freedom (2011)
2. Gladiator: Street Fighter (2012)
3. Gladiator: Son of Spartacus (2013)
4. Gladiator: Vengeance (2014)

=== Roman Arena series (with T. J. Andrews) ===
Also acts as something of a prequel to the Eagle series as it features an earlier appearance of both characters Macro and Narcissus.

1. Arena (2013)
  1. Barbarian (2012)
  2. Challenger (2012)
  3. First Sword (2013)
  4. Revenge (2013)
  5. Champion (2013)

n.b. these novellas were available as e-books prior to publication of the full title.

=== Invader series (with T. J. Andrews) ===
1. Invader (2016)
  1. Death Beach (2014)
  2. Blood Enemy (2014)
  3. Dark Blade (2014)
  4. Imperial Agent (2015)
  5. Sacrifice (2015)

n.b. these novellas were available as e-books prior to publication of the full title.

=== Pirata series (with T. J. Andrews) ===
1. Pirata (2019)
  1. The Black Flag (2019)
  2. The Gates of Stone (2019)
  3. Hunters of the Sea (2019)
  4. Sea of Blood (2019)
  5. The Pirate Chief (2019)

n.b. these novellas were available as e-books prior to publication of the full title.

=== Roman Caratacus series (with T. J. Andrews) ===
1. Warrior (2022)
  1. The King in Rome (2022)
  2. The Druids' Lair (2022)
  3. Brothers of the Sword (2023)
  4. The War Prince (2023)
  5. Lord of War (2023)
  n.b. these novellas were available as e-books prior to publication of the full title.
2. Warlord of Britannia (2026)

=== Inspector Horst Schenke novels ===
Mystery thrillers set in Berlin, Nazi Germany and focusing on Criminal Inspector Horst Schenke.

- Blackout (2022) -- Berlin, December 1939
- Dead of Night (2023) -- Berlin, January 1940
- A Death in Berlin (2025) -- Berlin, May 1940

=== Stand-alone novels ===
The following are books which are either stand-alone novels or have yet to be confirmed as parts of a series.

- The Sword and the Scimitar (2012) -- covers the Great Siege of Malta
- Hearts of Stone (2015) -- covers WWII period Greek island of Lefkas
- Playing With Death with Lee Francis (2018) -- Crime story

== Writer in Residence ==
In November 2006, Scarrow was accepted to fill the post of Writer in Residence at Simon Langton Grammar School for Boys, a position he said he was "honoured to accept".

== Personal life ==
Scarrow lives in Norfolk with his wife, Louise, and their dog. He gives talks on history and writing at festivals. His leisure interests include skiing and scuba diving.
