= Tiberius Claudius Narcissus =

Roman freedman and influential member of Claudius' imperial court

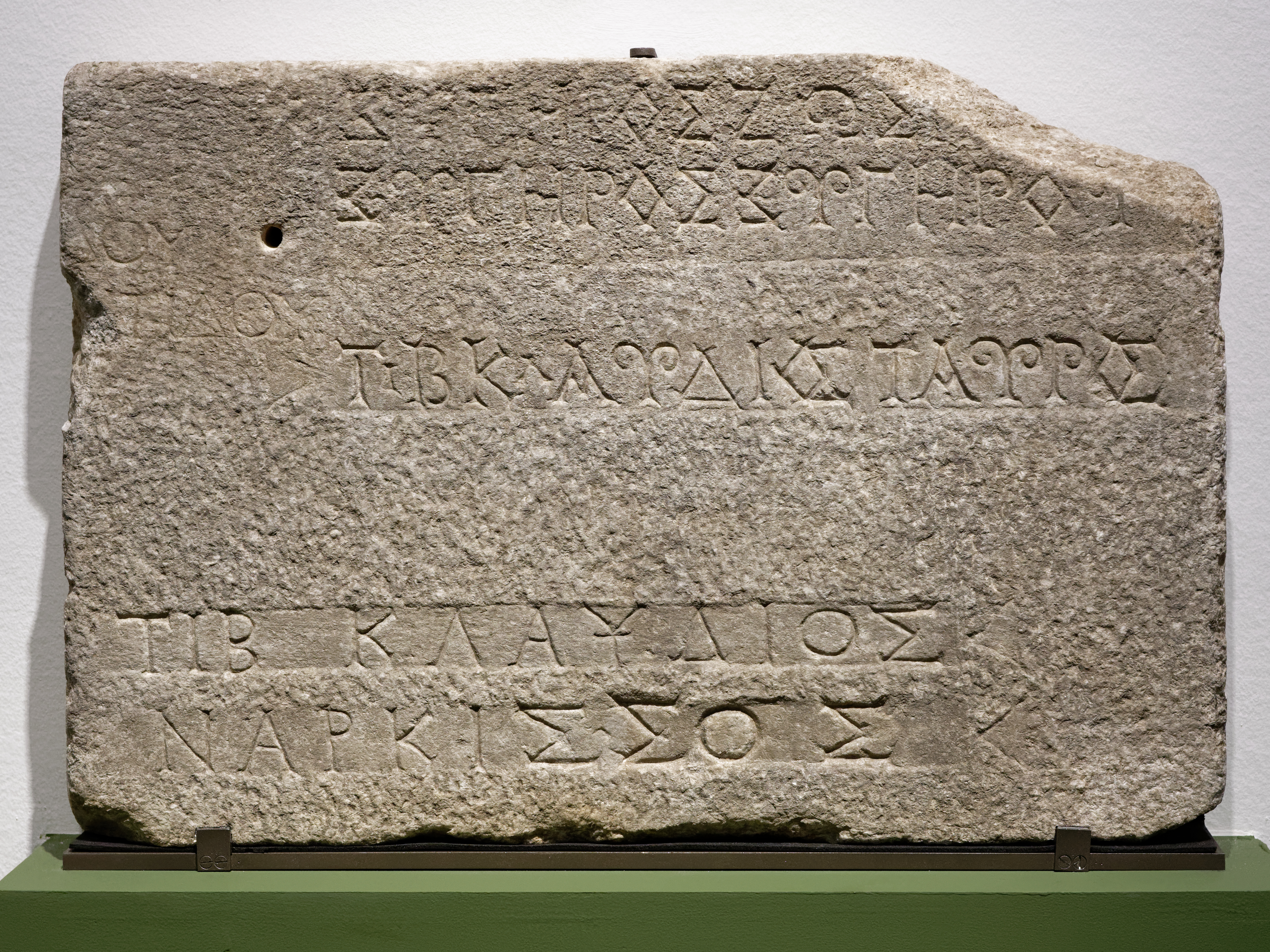
Inscription with the name of Tiberius Claudius Narcissus, c. 50 CE, from the Passage of the Theoroi in Thasos.

Tiberius Claudius Narcissus (died c. 54 AD) was one of the freedmen who formed the core of the imperial court under the Roman emperor Claudius. He is described as praepositus ab epistulis (in charge of correspondence).

== Early life ==
Narcissus was a freedman of Claudius.

== Imperial Court ==
=== 41 AD - Ab epistulis ===
In January 41, he reportedly had great influence over the emperor and amassed a great deal of money. He is said to have conspired with Claudius' third wife Valeria Messalina to manipulate him into having several men executed, although this is unproven. However, the sources admit that Narcissus, as Claudius' own former slave, was extremely loyal to the emperor, and so entrusted with more responsibility than the others.

=== 43 AD - Invasion of Britannia ===
In 43, during the preparations for the Roman conquest of Britain, he headed off a mutiny by addressing the troops. Seeing a former slave in their commander's position, they cried "Io Saturnalia!" (Saturnalia was a Roman festival when slaves and masters switched places for the day) and the mutiny ended. It was through his influence that the future emperor Vespasian was appointed legate of the Legio II Augusta in Germania.

=== 48 AD - Silius Affair ===
In 48, when Messalina married Gaius Silius, it was Narcissus who warned Claudius about Messalina, and seeing the emperor hesitate, he gave the order for her execution himself. Narcissus may have feared that Britannicus, Claudius's son with Messalina, would hold a grudge against him for this role.

When the time came for the emperor to select his fourth wife, Narcissus suggested to Claudius to remarry Aelia Paetina, the emperor's second wife. Anthony Barrett suggests that Narcissus' intention was to allow Claudius reason to pick Faustus Cornelius Sulla Felix, the husband of Claudius and Aelia's daughter Claudia Antonia, as his successor rather than the hostile Britannicus. It would also have given Claudius an adult heir, for which he was looking to shore up his position.

=== 49 AD - Agrippina the Younger ===
In 49 AD, after Claudius chose Agrippina the Younger in order to consolidate the Julio-Claudian family, and picked her son, the future Emperor Nero, to fill the role of temporary older heir, Narcissus allied with Britannicus' circle in order to secure his future.

Claudius still trusted Narcissus, and had him named praetor. He was charged with overseeing the construction of a canal to drain Fucine Lake, but Agrippina, now Claudius's fourth wife, accused him of embezzling funds from the project, possibly as punishment for his support of Britannicus. According to Tacitus, Narcissus hoped to bring down Agrippina by revealing her affair with the freedman Pallas, which would also have destroyed her son.

He supposedly told Britannicus of his plans in front of others, and was brazen in his intentions, promising to right all wrongs against him. It has been suggested that this last detail is an example of Tacitus altering facts to make Claudius a passive character in his reign. Suetonius and Dio report that, after reconciling with Britannicus, Claudius, not Narcissus, openly planned to bring Agrippina down.

=== 54 AD - Execution ===
In any case, Agrippina was suspicious of Narcissus and had him sent away to Campania, ostensibly to take advantage of the warm baths there to relieve his gout. This was probably intended to remove him as an obstacle of the assassination of Claudius and the accession of Nero. Agrippina ordered Narcissus' execution within weeks of Claudius' death in October, 54. Shortly after the announcement Narcissus returned to Rome. Just before his imprisonment and execution, he burned all Claudius' letters to prevent Nero from using their contents for nefarious ends.

=== Marriage ===
One extant funerary inscription records one Claudia Dicaeosyna as the "affectionate and frugal wife" of one Tiberius Claudius Narcissus, but whether he is identical to the emperor Claudius's freedman is uncertain. Her name suggests a Greek origin.

== As a character in literature ==
Narcissus is a character in the following works of fiction:

- In the satirical Apocolocyntosis of Seneca the Younger, written soon after Narcissus' death, the servant greets his old master Claudius in Hades and runs ahead of him through the gates of the underworld. He is scared by Cerberus, a dog-beast so unlike the little white dog Narcissus is mentioned as owning in life.
- Robert Graves' novel I, Claudius. In the TV adaptation, he is portrayed by John Cater.
- The French tragedy Britannicus, written by Racine in 1669, about the assassination of Britannicus by Nero.
- Simon Scarrow's Eagles of the Empire series of historical novels.
- Douglas Jackson's Caligula & Claudius books.

== Bibliography ==
- Alford, Henry. How to Study the New Testament: The Epistles. London: Daldy, Isbister & Co., 1877.
- Barrett, Anthony A. Agrippina: Sex, Power, and Politics in the Early Empire. London: Routledge, 1999.
- Bunson, Matthew. Encyclopedia of the Roman Empire. Infobase Publishing, 2009, ISBN 9781438110271, S. 381 (online copy, p. 381, at Google Books)
- Mason, Charles Peter. "Narcissus (2)". In William Smith (ed.). Dictionary of Greek and Roman Biography and Mythology. 2. Boston: Little, Brown & Co., 1867.
- Scullard, H. H. From the Gracchi to Nero. 5th edn. London: Routledge, 1982.
