= Headline Publishing Group =

British publishing company

- Parent company: Hachette
- Founded: 1986; 40 years ago
- Founder: Tim Hely Hutchinson
- Country of origin: United Kingdom
- Headquarters location: London, EC4
- Publication types: Books
- Imprints: Headline, Headline Feature. Headline Review, Eternal Romance, Tinder Press, Wildfire
- Official website: www.headline.co.uk

Headline Publishing Group is a British publishing brand and former company. It was founded in 1986 by Tim Hely Hutchinson. In 1993, Headline bought Hodder & Stoughton, and the company became Hodder Headline Ltd. In 1999, Hodder Headline was acquired by WH Smith. It was acquired by Hachette Livre from WH Smith in 2005.
