= Mount Carmel Academy (Louisiana) =

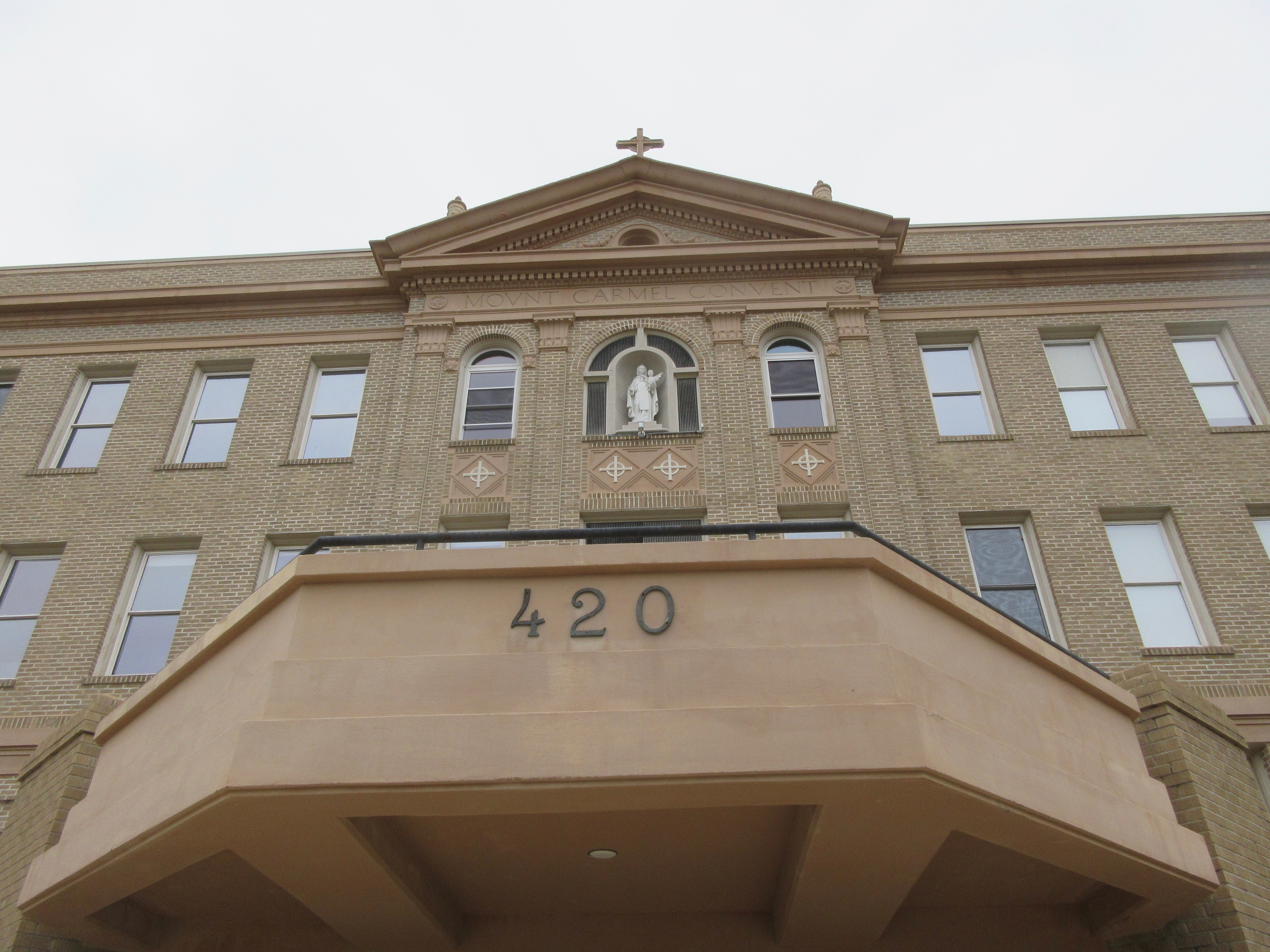

Location
- 7027 Milne Boulevard; New Orleans, Louisiana 70124; United States; 30°1′8″N 90°6′37″W

Information
- Type: Private
- Motto: Zelo zelatus sum pro Domino Deo exercituum (Latin) ("With zeal have I been zealous for the Lord God of hosts")
- Religious affiliations: Roman Catholic, Sisters of Our Lady of Mount Carmel
- Founded: 1833; 193 years ago
- President: Sr. Camille Anne Campbell, O.Carm.
- Principal: Beth Ann Simno (also Vice-President)
- Grades: 8–12
- Gender: Girls
- Average class size: 16
- Student to teacher ratio: 9:1
- Colors: Brown and white
- Athletics conference: LHSAA
- Mascot: Cub
- Nickname: Cubs
- Accreditation: Southern Association of Colleges and Schools
- Publication: Perspectives (literary magazine)
- Newspaper: Echoes of Carmel
- Yearbook: Sardonyx
- School fees: $1,600 (2023-24)
- Tuition: $10,500 (2023-24)
- Admissions Director: Jeanne Rachuba
- Athletic Director: Joe Boudoin
- Website: www.mcacubs.com

Mount Carmel Academy or Mt. Carmel is an all-girls, private, Catholic high school in the Lakeview area of New Orleans, Louisiana, United States. It is located in the Archdiocese of New Orleans. It is conducted by the Sisters of Our Lady of Mount Carmel, who have educated young ladies in New Orleans since 1833.

The campus of Mount Carmel is located in the Lakeview area in New Orleans at Allen Toussaint Boulevard, between West End Boulevard and Canal Boulevard.

Mount Carmel's sports teams are known as the "Cubs", and its school colors are brown and white. The school is accredited by the Southern Association of Colleges and Schools and the Louisiana Department of Education.

== History ==
The Sisters of Our Lady of Mount Carmel began in Tours, France, focused on a mission of educating young girls. Julie Thèrése Chevrel joined the community in 1825, and immigrated to New Orleans in 1833, and the sisters began to educate young women in Southern Louisiana.

In 1916, Mother Clare Coady built the foundation for the present-day Mount Carmel Academy by establishing accredited high school programs and requiring that sisters receive the proper professional teaching training.

Sister Mary Angela Duplantis was the first principal of the school, serving from 1926 to 1955. Sister Mary Grace Danos, who was principal from 1955 to 1980, expanded the school.

Beth Ann Simno served as vice-president and vice-principal under Sister Camille Anne for many years, and in 2014, she became the school's fourth principal. Sister Camille Anne is currently continuing as the school's president.

== Awards ==
- Recognized as a Top 50 Catholic High School in the U.S. and the only Louisiana school to receive the honor in 2005, 2006, 2010, 2011
- Mount Carmel Academy has twice been recognized by the U.S. Department of Education's Exemplary School Program as a Blue Ribbon School. It is the only school in Louisiana to be recognized twice with this honor.
- Recognized four times by the Cardinal Newman Society as being named to the Catholic Education Honor Roll as a School of Excellence.
- In 1998, Mount Carmel was one of only 12 recipients nationwide of the Catholic Schools for Tomorrow Award for Innovations in Technology, presented annually by Today's Catholic Teacher magazine.
- Mount Carmel Academy has been recognized by the U.S. Department of Education as an outstanding Safe & Drug-free school.
- Mount Carmel also was selected as a finalist in the America's Drug & Alcohol-Free School of the Year 2000 competition.
- Recipient of the Excellence in Civics Education from the Acton Society. The society also named Mount Carmel a Best Catholic High School, 2007 and 2012.
- Recognized twice nationwide by Today's Catholic Teacher: in 2012 for the national Catholic Schools for Tomorrow Award for Innovations in Technology and in 2015 for the national Innovations in Catholic Education Award for the Faculty Learning Lab
- Recipient of the Louisiana State University, Baton Rouge, Spring Testing Award for 22 consecutive years
- Recognized for maintaining 50 years of continuous accreditation from the Southern Association of Colleges and Schools Council on Accreditation and School Improvement (SACS CASI)
- Stem certified in 2020

== Athletics ==
Mount Carmel athletics competes in the LHSAA.

Sports teams:

- Fall: cross country, swimming, volleyball
- Winter: soccer, indoor track and field, basketball, powerlifting
- Spring: golf, tennis, track and field, softball, gymnastics (Division II)

Mount Carmel also offers other athletic clubs and teams including the Carmelettes dance team, rhythm dance team, Cubettes dance team, competition cheerleading, game squad cheerleading, and sailing team.

=== Championships ===
Since 1992, the athletics program has earned 121 district titles, 35 state titles, 19 state runner up titles, and 37 individual titles.

== Notable alumnae ==
- Kristen Nuss, 2024 Olympian for USA beach volleyball
- Stephanie Langhoff, film producer, known for Safety Not Guaranteed (2012), Jeff, Who Lives at Home (2011) and The Skeleton Twins (2014)
- Valerie Martin, novelist, known for Property and Mary Reilly
- Robin Mathews, makeup artist, won Academy Award for her transformative makeup in the film Dallas Buyers Club
- Barbara Menendez, vocalist and keyboards player for the rock band The Cold
- Amanda Shaw, musician, fiddle player, attended but did not graduate
- Stassi Schroeder, American television personality, podcast host, fashion blogger, and model
- Francesca Roberts, actress, known for playing "Big Bertha" in a live action movie Super Mario Bros.
- Margaret Clark, writer, known for Yellow Jack: A History of Yellow Fever (1997), By Louisiana Hands (2002), The Louisiana Irish (2005), Walking Through Rome (2013), and Respiratory Care: Cardiopulmonary Anatomy & Physiology (2020)

== Hurricane Katrina ==
Mount Carmel is located near the 17th Street Canal, and suffered extreme flood damage during Hurricane Katrina. The school remained closed for several months, but made repairs at a fast pace. It re-opened in January 2006. It was the first school in the New Orleans area that re-opened.
