= Robley Wilson =

American poet (1930–2018)

- Born: June 15, 1930; Brunswick, Maine, U.S.
- Died: August 7, 2018 (aged 88); Orlando, Florida, U.S.
- Education: University of Iowa, Bowdoin College
- Occupations: Poet, writer, editor
- Spouses: Charlotte Lehon (m. 1955–1990) Susan Hubbard (m. 1995–2018)

Robley Wilson (June 15, 1930 – August 7, 2018) was an American poet, writer, and editor. Educated at Bowdoin College, B.A., 1957; Indiana University, graduate study, 1960; University of Iowa, M.F.A., 1968. Married Charlotte Lehon, August 20, 1955 (divorced, 1990); married fiction writer Susan Hubbard in 1995; two sons: (first marriage) Stephen, Philip, two stepdaughters: Kate and Clare, and two grandchildren, Sam and Kate.

== Life ==
Wilson taught creative writing at the University of Northern Iowa from 1964 to 1996, and from 1969 to 2000 was editor of the North American Review, a university-owned magazine which twice won the National Magazine Award for Fiction administered by the American Society of Magazine Editors. The magazine was a finalist in the fiction category six times.

Wilson had been visiting writer at the University of Iowa Writers Workshop, Beloit College, Northwestern University, Pitzer College, and the University of Central Florida.

A short film, Favorites, adapted from Wilson's short story, produced and directed by Tracy Facelli, premiered at the 2017 Film Prize: Memphis; it features Jeff Boyet and Nettie Kraft in the lead roles. Another short film, based on his story "Terrible Kisses". features Saffron Burrows and Jack Davenport; it was screened in 2004 at the Rushes Short Film Festival in London's Soho district, has been seen on Sky television in the U.K., and is still available on YouTube. Wilson's screenplay Paradise was a semi-finalist in the 2005 Screenwriting Expo competition.

Co-edited with Susan Hubbard: 100% Pure Florida Fiction, an anthology of Florida short stories written since 1985 (University Press of Florida, 2000).

Co-founded literary consultancy, Blue Garage, with Susan Hubbard.

== Awards ==
- 1986 Agnes Lynch Starrett Poetry Prize
- 1983–84 Guggenheim Fellow in fiction.
- 1982 Drue Heinz Literature Prize
- 1995 Nicholl Fellow in Screenwriting
- 1991 Society of Midland Authors Award for Poetry
- 1979 Editor's Fellowship (Coordinating Council of Literary Magazines)

== Works ==
=== Poetry collections ===
- Everything Paid For. University Press of Florida. 1999. ISBN 978-0-8130-1716-7.
- A Walk Through the Human Heart. Kansas City MO: Helicon Nine "Feuiletts" Series. 1995. ISBN 978-1-884235-17-7.
- A Pleasure Tree. University of Pittsburgh Press. 1990. ISBN 978-0-8229-3635-0.
- Kingdoms of the Ordinary. University of Pittsburgh Press. 1987. ISBN 978-0-8229-3557-5.
- Returning to the Body. LaCrosse WI: Juniper Press. 1977. ISBN 978-1-55780-019-0.

=== Novels ===
- After Paradise. Pittsburgh, PA: Black Lawrence Press. 2017. ISBN 978-1625579782.
- The World Still Melting. A Thomas Dunne Book. 2005. ISBN 978-0-312-33679-0.
- Splendid Omens. St. Martin's Press. 2004. ISBN 978-0-312-32167-3.
- The Victim's Daughter. New York NY: Simon and Schuster. 1991. ISBN 978-0-671-72618-8.

=== Stories ===
- Who Will Hear Your Secrets?. Baltimore, MD: Johns Hopkins University Press. 2012. ISBN 978-1421404622.
- "Fathers". Ploughshares. Winter 1983. Archived from the original on November 15, 2007.
- The Book of Lost Fathers. Johns Hopkins University Press. 2001. ISBN 978-0-8018-6717-0.
- Terrible Kisses. New York NY: Simon & Schuster. 1989. ISBN 978-0-241-12776-6.
- Dancing for Men. University of Pittsburgh Press. 1983. ISBN 978-0-8229-3466-0.
- Living Alone [stories]. Canton NY, Fiction International, 1978
- The Pleasures of Manhood. University of Illinois Press. 1977. ISBN 978-0-252-00670-8.

=== Editor ===
- Susan Hubbard, Robley Wilson, ed. (2000). 100% Pure Florida Fiction. University Press of Florida. ISBN 978-0-8130-1752-5.
- Robley Wilson, ed. (1990). The Place That Holds Our History: The 1990 Missouri Writers' Biennial. Springfield, MO: Missouri Arts Council. ISBN 978-0912527055.
- Robley Wilson, ed. (1987). Four-Minute Fictions: 50 Short-Short Stories from The North American Review. Flagstaff AZ: Word Beat Press. ISBN 978-0912527055.
- Stephen Minot, Robley Wilson, ed. (1972). Three Stances of Modern Fiction: A Critical Anthology of the Short Story. Cambridge, MA: Winthrop Publishers, Inc. ISBN 978-0876268759.

=== Short fiction ===
- Addison. ANTAEUS 24 Winter 1976 p 28-48.
- Adieu, Marianne. SANTA MONICA REVIEW Fall 2018 (in press)
- Africa. TRIQUARTERLY 66 Spring/Summer 1986 p. 65-83. in Gibbons, Reginald, and Susan Hahn, eds., Fiction of the Eighties: A decade of stories from TriQuarterly. Evanston IL, Northwestern University, 990. p 335-53.
- An Age of Beauty and Terror. SOUTHERN CALIFORNIA ANTHOLOGY Vol. XI p. 17-26.
- Angels. ]BOULEVARD 4/5:201-18 Spring 1990.
- Animals. THE LASCAUX REVIEW 2 June 2013
- The Apple. CARLETON MISCELLANY 9:24-34 Winter 1968. In Minot, Stephen, and Wilson, Robley, Jr., Three Stances of Modern Fiction: A Critical Anthology of the Short Story. Cambridge MA, Winthrop Publishers, Inc., 1972. p. 182-91.
- Appliances. NIMROD 37:132-5 Fall/Winter 1993. AMERICA WEST AIRLINES MAGAZINE 12:106, 108, 110, 112 November 1997.
- Artists and Their Models. NORTHERN OHIO LIVE 1:22-5 Aug. 24-Sept. 6, 1981.
- Banners. \SOUTHERN CALIFORNIA ANTHOLOGY Vol. XIII (1996) p. 73-86.
- Barber. PEN Syndicated Fiction Project, 1985–86. NEWSDAY November 1985 (Published but not seen) THE VILLAGE ADVOCATE (Chapel Hill, NC) 7:7-8 February 16, 1986.
- Bears. WIGLEAF (Online: wigleaf.com), May 4, 2010.
- A Berchtesgaden Night. PIECES 1 July 1979 p. 8.
- Bloodweed (excerpt) THE LITERARIAN September 2013 California. THE IOWA REVIEW 25:23-46 Fall 1995.
- Catch and Release. SAW PALM 6:155-168 Spring 2012.
- Cat Watching [Lessons in Cats]. NIMROD 17:68-75 Fall/Winter 1972. In Fireman, Judy, ed., Cat Catalog: The Ultimate Cat Book. New York, NY, Workman Publishing Company, 1976. p 67-8. [excerpt] In Rogak, Linda A., The Quotable Cat. Chicago IL, Contemporary Books, 1992. p 108. [excerpt]
- Cats. NEW YORKER 60:24-8 January 28, 1985. VIVA (Amsterdam) 1990 No. 5. (Tr. by Mariella Snel) In Rosen, Michael J., ed., The Company of Cats. New York, NY, Doubleday, 1992. p 18-28.
- Celebrity. TWILIGHT ZONE MAGAZINE 6:42-44 April 1986.
- Children. MISSISSIPPI REVIEW 9:66 Winter-Spring 1980.
- The Climate in Florida. [See "Packing"]
- Columbus. In Van Cleve, Ryan G., and Virgil Suarez, eds., Micro: An Anthology of Really Short Stories, Lake View, NY, White Pine Press, 2001. (In press)
- Crooked. SANTA MONICA REVIEW 23:1 Spring 2011 p. 153-178.
- Crossings. MISSISSIPPI REVIEW 9:70 Winter-Spring 1980.
- The Dark. HOPKINS REVIEW4:309-328 Summer 2011.
- A Day of Splendid Omens. TRIQUARTERLY 103 Fall 1998 pp. 104–119.
- The Decline of the West. PEN Syndicated Fiction Project, 1985. NORTHWEST MAGAZINE (The Sunday Oregonian) 20:20-1 January 27, 1985. THIS WORLD (San Francisco Sunday Examiner and Chronicle, January 27, 1985 pp. 15–16. ENQUIRER MAGAZINE (Cincinnati Sunday Enquirer) April 21, 1985 p. 10-12.
- Despair. In Anderson, Donald, ed., Aftermath: A Post-Vietnam Fiction Reader. New York NY, Henry Holt & Co., 1995. pp. 171–7.
- The Demonstration. CARLETON MISCELLANY 11:40-54 Summer 1970.
- Dorothy & Her Friends. SANTA MONICA REVIE 2:79-145 Spring 1990.
- The Eventual Nuclear Destruction of Cheyenne, Wyoming. ATLANTIC 251:72-5 May 1983.
- Fashion. MISSISSIPPI REVIEW 9:68 Winter-Spring 1980. In Robinson, S. D., ed., Fast Forward: Destinations. Scarborough, Ontario, Canada, Prentice-Hall Canada, 1990. pp. 136–7.
- Fathers. PLOUGHSHARES 9/4 pp. 131–136. In Henry, DeWitt, ed., The Ploughshares Reader: New Fiction for the Eighties. Yonkers NY, The Pushcart Press, 1985. p334-9.
- Favorites. In Woodman, Allen, ed., Stories about How Things Fall Apart and What's Left When They Do. Tallahassee FL, Word Beat Press, 1985. pp. 27–32. [Preferinte]. ORIZONT [Bucharest) March 6, 1986 p. 8. (Translated into Romanian by Marcel Pop-Cornis). [As "A Sweet Memory"]. REDBOOK 174:172,174 March 1990. THE MATILDA ZIEGLER MAGAZINE FOR THE BLIND (In press). In Hemley, Robin, Turning Life into Fiction. Cincinnati, Ohio, Story Press, 1994. pp. 93–4 [Excerpt]
- A Fear of Children. ANTAEUS 38 Summer 1980 pp. 73–86. Feature Presentations. SEWANEE REVIEW 96:389-406 Summer 1988.
- Flaggers. ISAAC ASIMOV'S SCIENCE FICTION MAGAZINE 11:104-11 June 1987.
- Flies. STORY 38:54-61 Winter 1990. Forfeits. NEW WORLD WRITING , 1/2/2016.
- Happy Marriages Are All Alike. FICTION INTERNATIONAL 1:49-53 Fall 1973.
- Hard Times. EPOCH 44:180-194 1995 Series. In So the Story Goes: Twenty-Five Years of the Johns Hopkins Short Fiction Series. Baltimore MD, Johns Hopkins University Press, 2005. pp. 278–94.
- His Cheatin' Heart [See also "Pillow Talk"]. REDBOOK 163:28,31 August 1984. WOMEN'S MAGAZINE [South Africa] (Not seen)
- The Hundred Steps. PIECES 1 July 1979 p. 16. Iris. INDIANA REVIEW 8:7-13 Spring 1985.
- Land Fishers.] ANTAEUS 48 Winter 1983 p. 183-199. In Murphy, George, Jr., ed., The Editors' Choice: New American Stories, Vol. 1. New York, NY, Bantam Books, Inc., 1985. pp. 267–85.
- Lessons in Cats. [See "Cat Watching"]
- Likeness. IOWA CITY MAGAZINE June/July 1991 pp. 53–5. VIVA [Amsterdam] (In press) (Translated into Dutch by Mariella Snel.)
- Links. THE HOPKINS REVIEW n.s. 5:518-30 Fall 2012. Living Alone. In Oates, Joyce Carol, ed., Best American Short Stories of 1979. Boston MA, Houghton Mifflin Company, 1979. pp. 167–71. In Nobumori, Hiromitsu, ed., The Best American Short Stories. Tokyo, Japan, The Hokuseido Press, 1983. pp. 89–97. (Selected from J. C. Oates: The Best American Short Stories 1979, and annotated [in Japanese] by the editor).
- The Mall. In Swartwood, Robert, ed., Hint Fiction: An Anthology of Stories in 25 Words or Fewer. New York NY, W.W. Norton, 2011. p. 83.
- Menagerie. In Rubin, Gay, ed., Michigan Hot Apples 2. Bloomfield Hills MI, Hot Apples Press, 1973. p. 59-64.
- Mice. PRAIRIE SCHOONER 69:116-24 Winter 1995.
- Mothers. MINNESOTA REVIEW NS 16 Spring 1981 p. 151.
- Nam. GEORGIA REVIEW 38:369-75 Summer 1984.
- One of Our Boys. CRESSET 25:12-13 December 1961.
- On the Island. METAMORPHOSIS 1961 1:19-25 Spring 1961. In McNair, Wesley, ed. The Quotable Moose: A Contemporary Maine Reader Hanover NH, University Press of New England, 1994. pp. 196–210.
- Others. CARLETON MISCELLANY 6:4-29 Fall 1965. In Merriam, Sharan B., ed., Themes of Adulthood through Literature. New York NY, Teachers College Press Columbia University, 1983. pp. 30–51.
- Packing. SEWANEE REVIEW CXIII:501-17 Fall 2005.
- Parts Runner. SANTA MONICA REVIEW 12:116-27 Spring 2000.
- Payment in Kind. SEWANEE REVIEW 93:20-38 Winter 1985.In Norris, Gloria, ed., New American Short Stories: The Writers Select Their Own Favorites. New York NY, New American Library, 1987. p. 311-331.
- The Perfect Wife [De Perfecte Vrouw]. VIVA [Amsterdam] p 52-4 #24: 7 June-14 June 1991. (Translated into Dutch by Mariella Snel.)
- Period Piece. THE HOPKINS REVIEW 2:508-16 Fall 2009.
- Petra. SEWANEE REVIEW 94:45-57 Winter 1986.
- The Phoenix Agent. LOST MAGAZINE (www.LOSTmag.com) November 2006.
- Pillow Talk [See also "His Cheatin' Heart"]. WOMAN [Great Britain] July 6, 1985, p. 21.
- Praises. THE LAUREL REVIEW 22:77-107 Winter 1988.
- Quarters. AETHLON: The Journal of Sport Literature XXVII:2 Spring/Summer 2010. pp. 49–55.
- Quills. PRAIRIE SCHOONER 66:25-34 Summer 1992. In Rosen, Michael J., ed., The Company of Animals. New York, NY, Doubleday. 1993, pp. 198–209.
- Remembered Names. THE GETTYSBURG REVIEW 4:593-608 Winter 1997.
- Salt & Pepper. In Stiller's Pond: New Fiction from the Upper Midwest. Second edition. St. Paul MN, New Rivers Press. 1991, pp. 456–7.
- Saying Goodbye to the President. ESQUIRE 81:124, 138, 140 February 1974. In Bellamy, Joe David, ed., SuperFiction, or The American Story Transformed: An Anthology. New York NY, Vintage Books, 1975. pp. 187–94. In Lish, Gordon, ed., All Our Secrets Are the Same. New York, N.Y., W. W. Norton & Company, 1976, pp. 1–2.
- The Seasonal: Pamela. SEATTLE REVIEW 9:70-8 Spring 1986.
- Silent Partners. THE CREAM CITY REVIEW 13:182-7 Winter 1989. VIVA (Amsterdam) 1990 No. 3 (Tr. by Mariella Snel). In McNally, John, ed., High Infidelity. New York, NY, William Morrow & Company, 1997. pp. 259–65. In McNally, John, ed., High Infidelity. New York, NY, Quill Edition, William Morrow & Company, 1998. pp. 259–65.
- A Simple Elegy for Speaking and Touching. POET & CRITIC 18:44-8 Fall 1986.
- Sisters. PEN Syndicated Fiction Project, 1988. VILLAGE ADVOCATE (Chapel Hill, NC) 2:3-4 May 29, 1988. COSMOPOLITAN (England) (Not seen) (Søstre]. DET NYE (Norway) March 1990 pp. 76–8.
- Sons. THE AMERICAN VOICE 8 Fall 1987 pp. 30–42. DOWN EAST 36:120, 82-91 January 1990.
- The States. PRAIRIE SCHOONER 61:93-103 Fall 1987.
- A Stay at the Ocean. CARLETON MISCELLANY 10:39-54 Summer 1969. In Stadler, John, ed., Eco-Fiction. New York, NY, Washington Square Press, 1971. pp. 85–99. Az oceanon]. In Peter, Kuczka, ed., Galaktika 30. Budapest, Hungary, Kozmosz Konyvek szerkesztosege, 1978. pp. 4–14. (Translated into Hungarian by F. Nagy Piroska) In Fischer, Jeff, and Alison Daley Stevenson, eds., Maine Speaks: An Anthology of Maine Literature. Brunswick ME, Maine Writers and Publishers Alliance, 1989. pp. 250–261. In Thoughtful Reading. Perfection Form Co. 1989.
- Still Life. NEW WORLD WRITING , 1/2/2016.
- A Story with Sex and Violence. MINNESOTA REVIEW NS 16 Spring 1981. p. 150.
- A Sweet Memory. [See "Favorites"] The Tennis Lover. [See "Quarters"]
- Terrible Kisses. In Datlow, Ellen, and Terri Windling, eds., The Year's Best Fantasy and Horror: Third Annual Collection, New York NY, St. Martin's Press, 1990. pp. 518–23. VIVA (Amsterdam) 1990 No. 7. (Tr. Mariella Snel)
- Terrorism. NEW WORLD WRITING , 1/2/2016.
- Thief. FICTION INTERNATIONAL 12 (1980) pp. 34–6. In Shapard, Robert, and James Thomas, eds., Sudden Fiction. Layton UT, Gibbs M. Smith, Inc., 1986. pp. 168–70. In Odeldahl, Lena, and Lisa Washburn, eds., Windows 2. Solna, Sweden, Almqvist & Wiksell Läromedel AB, 1989. pp. 15–18. In Moor, Rosemary, ed., Take It from Here. London, England, Stanley Thornes (Publishers) Ltd, 1991. pp. 51–7. In Yvinec, M. & Mrs., eds., Autonomy: Méthode d'anglais Terminales. Paris, France, Hachette, 1992. Voice of America (Broadcast) [Indonesian] In Watkinson, Ellen, Lena Odeldahl & Lisa Washburn, eds., Windows: English for Secondary Comprehensive School. Oslo, Norway, NKS-Forlaget, 1991. pp. 127–30. In Expressions: Stories and Poems. Chicago IL, Contemporary Books, Inc. 1991. pp. 59–63. In Thompson, Keith, ed., To Be A Man. Los Angeles, CA, Jeremy P. Tarcher, Inc. 1992. In Adams, W. Royce, ed., Making the Grade: Student's Reading Journal. Boston MA, D.C.Heath & Co. 1992. pp. 91–6. Ibid. Second edition, 1997. pp. 92–7. In May, Charles, ed., Fiction's Many Worlds. Boston MA, D. C. Heath & Co. 1993. pp. 42–4.(excerpt) In Another Page. New York, NY, Macmillan/McGraw-Hill (Glencoe Foundations for Success [software]), 1993. TRAIN OF THOUGHT (audio magazine) (In press) In Watkinson, Ellen, Lena Odeldahl & Lisa Washburn, eds., Facts and Feelings. Oslo, Norway, NKS-Forlaget, 1994. pp. 187–190. In Plötzliche Geschichten, Fischer Verlag [paper] (published, not seen). (Dieb) In Johler, Jens, Das minimale Mißgeschick. Köln, Germany, Verlag Kiepenheuer & Witsch, 1995. pp. 34–7. (Translated into German by Eike Schonfeld) In Kaleela, Maija-Leena, et al., eds. English Update. Espoo, Finland, Weilin & Gîîs, 1994. pp. 100–101. (Dieb) FUNK UHR No. 34 (26.Aug-1.Sept 1995) p. 87. (Condensed, from the German translation by Eike Schonfeld) In Jacobi, Ilan. In Myszor, Frank, ed., Moments of Madness: 150 Years of Short Stories. Cambridge, U.K., Cambridge University Press, 1998. pp. 115–18. In Grellet, Françoise, ed., 10 Short Stories. Hachette Livre, 2000. pp. 78–86. In Wideman, John Edgar, ed. 20: The Best of the Drue Heinz Literature Prize. Pittsburgh, PA, University of Pittsburgh Press, 2001. pp. 61–4.
- The Thousand-and-Second Night. SOUTHERN CALIFORNIA ANTHOLOGY Vol. IV (1986) pp. 75–9. SOUTHERN CALIFORNIA ANTHOLOGY Vol. X (1993) pp. 150–4.
- The Three-Wish Story. BRIAR CLIFF REVIEW 5:4-6 Spring 1993.AMERICA WEST AIRLINES MAGAZINE 13:44-7 July 1998.
- The United States. FICTION INTERNATIONAL 6-7(1976) pp. 94–100. In Henderson, Bill, ed., The Pushcart Prize, III: Best of the Small Presses. Yonkers, NY, The Pushcart Press, 1978. pp. 197–207.
- Visions. COLORADO STATE REVIEW 5:14-36 Spring 1977. Visits. NEW AMERICAN WRITING #6 Spring 1990. pp. 107–11. Wasps. STORY QUARTERLY 9 Spring 1979 pp. 22–8. In Cassill, R. V., ed., The Norton Anthology of Short Fiction, 3rd edition. New York, NY, W. W. Norton & Co., 1986. pp. 1502–9. [Wespen]. VIVA (Amsterdam) p52-3,55 #31: 26 July-2 August 1991. (Translated into Dutch by Mariella Snel) In Murabito, Stephen, ed. Connections, Contexts, and Possibilities. Englewood Cliffs, N.J., Prentice-Hall, Inc. 2000. pp. 213–19. In Minott, Katherine, et al., eds. Journeys Through Our World. Boston, Mass. Pearson Custom Publishing, 2002. pp. 188–95.
- Watching. CARLETON MISCELLANY 11:2-8 Spring 1970.
- Wedding Day THE LITERARIAN (http://centerforfiction.org/magazine/) March 2011.
- Weights and Measures. THE IOWA REVIEW 14:26-29 Winter 1984. PEN Syndicated Fiction Project, 1985–86. THE VILLAGE ADVOCATE (Chapel Hill NC) 7:5 (2nd section) January 19, 1986.
- The Word. THE SUN February 2003 No. 326 p. 29. In Safransky, Sy, et al., The Mysterious Life of the Heart: Writing from The Sun About Passion, Longing, and Love, Chapel Hill, N.C., The Sun Publishing Co., 2009. pp. 257–8.
- The World Still Melting. NEW ENGLAND REVIEW Fall 1992 14:240-51 Fall 1992.
