= Lost in Translation (novel) =

1999 novel by Nicole Mones

- Author: Nicole Mones
- Publisher: Delacorte Press
- ISBN: 978-0-385-31934-8

Lost in Translation is a novel written by American author Nicole Mones, published by Bantam Dell in 1999. It is the story of an American woman trying to lose her past by living as a translator in China. The novel's accolades include the Janet Heidinger Kafka Prize, the Pacific Northwest Booksellers Association Award, and The New York Times Book Review's Notable Book and Editor's Choice.

== Summary ==
Expatriate translator Alice Mannegan spends her nights in Beijing's smoky bars, seeking fleeting encounters with Chinese men to blot out the shame of her racist father back in Texas. But when she signs on to an archaeological expedition searching for the missing bones of Peking Man in China's remote Northwest deserts, her world cracks open. As the group follows the trail of the Jesuit philosopher/paleontologist Teilhard de Chardin to close in on one of archaeology's greatest mysteries, Alice finds herself increasingly drawn to a Chinese professor who is shackled by his own painful memories. Love in all its forms–human, sexual, divine, between a nation and its history, a man and his past, a father and his daughter–drives the story to its breathtaking finish.

== Background ==
In a blog interview discussing her works, Mones described Alice, the main character, as "one of the few characters who really seemed to write herself". Mones also recalls her past working in China as an inspiration for Alice:

When I was young, I was close to a young man whose father was suspected of having committed a racially motivated murder during the Civil Rights movement in the U.S. in the early 1960s. The burden of second-hand guilt lay heavy on my friend, and he moved to Hong Kong and refused to return to America. Then, he was killed in an accident. Looking back, I think I started writing the novel a few years after his death in order to play out his story and give it an ending.

== Reception ==
=== Reviews ===
BookPage's Julie Checkoway called Lost in Translation an "ambitious debut novel" and highlighted the book's driving question: "Isn't ancestry, one's place in a personal, familial and cultural lineage, a difficult fact to ignore or erase?"

Lisa See, writing for The New York Times, discussed how Mones "used her story to talk about race and racism, especially in the ways that Chinese and Americans view each other." See noted that "while Mones seems to be exploring issues of race and taboo, her treatment of them is finally muddled. Still, her search for [...] that enigmatic place where man and woman fall in love is thought-provoking, sometimes disturbing and undeniably entertaining."

=== Awards and honors ===
The New York Times Book Review named Lost in Translation a notable book.

Awards for Lost in Translation
Year	Award	Result	Ref.
1998	Janet Heidinger Kafka Prize	Winner	
1999	Pacific Northwest Booksellers Association Award	Winner	
