= Janet Heidinger Kafka Prize =

American fiction award

- Awarded for: Best book-length work of prose fiction by an American woman
- Country: United States
- Presented by: University of Rochester
- Reward: US$7,500
- First award: 1975; 51 years ago
- Most recent recipient: Marian Crotty

Highlights
- Most awards: Mary Gordon (2)
- Website: https://rochester.edu/college/wst/kafka_prize/

The Janet Heidinger Kafka Prize is a literary award presented annually for the "best book-length work of prose fiction" by an American woman. The award has been given by the Susan B. Anthony Institute for Gender and Women's Studies and the Department of English at the University of Rochester since 1975.

Each winner is awarded $15,000.

The prize is named for a 30-year-old editor killed in an auto accident. Family, friends, and associates in the publishing industry endowed the prize as a memorial to Kafka and "the literary standards and personal ideals for which she stood".

== Winners ==
Year of work	Recipient	Title of work	Publisher
1975	Jessamyn West	The Massacre at Fall Creek	Harcourt, Brace, Jovanovich
1976	Judith Guest	Ordinary People	Viking Press
1977	Toni Morrison	Song of Solomon	Alfred A. Knopf
1978	Mary Gordon	Final Payments	Random House
1979	Barbara Chase-Riboud	Sally Hemings	Viking Press
1980	Anne Tyler	Morgan's Passing	Alfred A. Knopf
1981	Mary Gordon	The Company of Women	Random House
1982	Mary Lee Settle	The Killing Ground	Farrar, Straus and Giroux
1983	Joan Chase	During the Reign of the Queen of Persia	Harper & Row
1984	Rosellen Brown	Civil Wars	Alfred A. Knopf
1985	Ursula K. Le Guin	Always Coming Home	Harper & Row
1986	Hortense Calisher	The Bobby Soxer	Doubleday
1987	Gail Godwin	A Southern Family	William Morrow and Company
1988	Kathryn Davis	Labrador	Farrar, Straus and Giroux
1989	Marianne Wiggins	John Dollar	Harper & Row
1990	Valerie Martin	Mary Reilly	Doubleday
1990	Karen Tei Yamashita	Through the Arc of the Rain Forest	Coffee House Press
1993	Sherri Szeman	The Kommandant’s Mistress	HarperCollins
1994	Ann Patchett	Taft	Houghton Mifflin Harcourt
1995	Melissa Pritchard	The Instinct for Bliss	Zoland Books
1996	Kathleen Cambor	The Book of Mercy	Farrar, Straus and Giroux
1997	Cristina García	The Agüero Sisters	Alfred A. Knopf
1998	Nicole Mones	Lost in Translation	Dell Publishing
1999	Susan Hubbard	Blue Money	University of Missouri Press
2000	Carrie Brown	The Hatbox Baby	Workman Publishing Company
2001	Edie Meidav	The Far Field: A Novel of Ceylon	Houghton Mifflin Harcourt
2002	Joyce Hackett	Disturbance of the Inner Ear	Carroll & Graf
2003	Kate Moses	Wintering	St. Martin's Press
2004	Sarah Shun-lien Bynum	Madeleine Is Sleeping	Harcourt
2005	Jill Ciment	The Tattoo Artist	Pantheon Books
2006	Nell Freudenberger	The Dissident	Ecco Press
2007	Miranda Beverly-Whittemore	Set Me Free	Warner Books
2008	Saher Alam	The Groom to Have Been	Spiegel & Grau
2009	Isla Morley	Come Sunday	Farrar, Straus and Giroux
2010	Linda LeGarde Grover	The Dance Boots	University of Georgia Press
2011	Amy Waldman	The Submission	Farrar, Straus and Giroux
2012	Anna Keesey	Little Century	Farrar, Straus and Giroux
2013	Ru Freeman	On Sal Mal Lane	Graywolf Press
2014	Jacinda Townsend	Saint Monkey	W. W. Norton & Company
2015	Mia Alvar	In the Country	Alfred A. Knopf
2016	Elizabeth Poliner	As Close to Us as Breathing	Lee Boudreaux Books
2017	Marian Crotty	What Counts as Love	University of Iowa Press
2018	Tiffany Quay Tyson	The Past Is Never	Simon & Schuster
2019	Margaret Wilkerson Sexton	The Revisioners	Counterpoint
2020	Danielle Evans	The Office of Historical Corrections	Riverhead Books
2021	Rebecca Sacks	City of a Thousand Gates	HarperCollins
2022	Claire Stanford	Happy for You	Viking Press
2023	Ye Chun	Straw Dogs of the Universe	Catapult
2024	Claire Oshetsky	Poor Deer	Ecco

== See also ==
- List of literary awards honoring women
- List of American literary awards
