= Lara Porzak =

American fine art photographer

Lara Porzak (born April 14, 1967, in Rome, Italy) is an American fine art photographer.

== Early life and education ==
Porzak is the daughter of Pulitzer-prize nominated novelist, Marianne Wiggins. She attended Martha’s Vineyard Regional High School and received her degree from Dartmouth College. A self-proclaimed photography workshop junkie, Porzak has studied with Mary Ellen Mark, Graciela Iturbide and Christopher James amongst others.

== Career ==
Porzak works predominantly with black & white film and is acclaimed for using labour-intensive, non-digital photographic methods, often utilizing vintage cameras and lenses from the late 1800s to create her photographs. According to The Los Angeles Times, "Her photojournalistic style combines with the romantic influences of European photographers from the 1930s and ‘40s to give her work a timeless quality with a strong sense of narrative."

Porzak is "a real-deal fine art photographer" who has produced over 20 fine art photography shows and her work is part of the Getty museum's California Artist's Collection. The quality of her handmade photographs, using the gelatin silver process and tintypes has attracted many collectors throughout the world, as C Magazine so eloquently writes "If a picture is worth a thousand words, no doubt a Lara Porzak image is worth a great deal more." Her photographs have also appeared on many television shows & movies.

Porzak started her own photography business in the late 1990s as a fine art wedding photographer with a photojournalistic style. Porzak has photographed celebrity weddings including Jennifer Aniston, Drew Barrymore, Kevin Costner, Ellen DeGeneres, Mariska Hargitay, Heidi Klum, Adam Sandler, Brooke Shields, Channing Tatum and Reese Witherspoon. When asked about her wedding photography in a magazine interview Porzak is quoted as saying, “my interest in photography isn’t just so people can remember what happened, but so they can remember how they felt.”

== Published credited works (selected) ==
=== Books and magazines ===
- Foxman, Ariel (3 September 2024). "Step Inside Jennifer Garner's Cozy California Home". Architectural Digest.
- Hyman, Lizzie (25 September 2023). "Miracles Do Happen". People.
- Vreeland, Leslie (1 September 2022). "New Meets Old at Art Walk". Telluride Daily Planet.
- Berry, Lorraine (7 August 2022). "A Family's Labor of Love". Los Angeles Times.
- Wiggins, Marianne (2022). Properties of Thirst. Simon and Schuster Paperbooks. ISBN 9781416571261.
- DeVries, Annalise (1 September 2015). "Caught on Film". Fresh Style.
- Kelleher, Katy (April 2018). "Found Objects". Maine Home Design.
- "Lara Porzak: Wild Horse". Fresh Focus Photography. Leica.
- McKinnon, Kelsey. "An Artist's Perspective". C Magazine.
- McKinnon, Kelsey. "A Modern Romance, an interview with fine art film photographer, Lara Porzak". C Magazine. Fall 2015.
- Niemi, Wayne (4 May 2008). "Meet the experts". The Los Angeles Times.
- "Photographers". House and Gardens (January 2012).
- Shields, Brooke (2014). There Was a Little Girl: The Real Story of My Mother and Me. Plume. ISBN 9780147516565
- Wiggins, Marianne (2007). The Shadow Catcher. Simon and Schuster Paperbooks. ISBN 9780743265201.
- Williams-Paisley, Kimberly (2017). Where the Light Gets In: Losing My Mother Only to Find Her Again. Three Rivers Press. ISBN 9781101902974.

=== Celebrity portraits ===
- "Celebrity Circuit". CBS News.
- "Drew's Perfect Day: Drew Barrymore & Will Kopelman's wedding photography by Lara Porzak". People. 2 June 2012.
- Ellen & Portia's Wedding: Ellen DeGeneres & Portia de Rossi's wedding photography by Lara Porzak". People. 1 September 2008.
- "Reese Witherspoon's Perfect Day: Reese Witherspoon & Jim Toth's wedding photography by Lara Porzak". People. 26 March 2011.
- "Sofi Newmyer, Benjamin Schultz". New York Times. 27 August 2017.
- Stebbins, Sarah (Winter 2005). "California Dreamy: Mariska Hargitay and Peter Hermann's wedding photography by Lara Porzak". InStyle Weddings: 318–325.
- Théval, Vincent (January 2011). ""Idaho" with Jeff Martin". Photography by Lara Porzak. La Liberation Magazine.
- Vulpo, Mike. "Ellen DeGeneres Has the Sweetest Message for Portia de Rossi on Their Ninth Wedding Anniversary". E News!. 16 August 2017.
