= Nell Freudenberger =

American novelist, essayist, and short-story writer

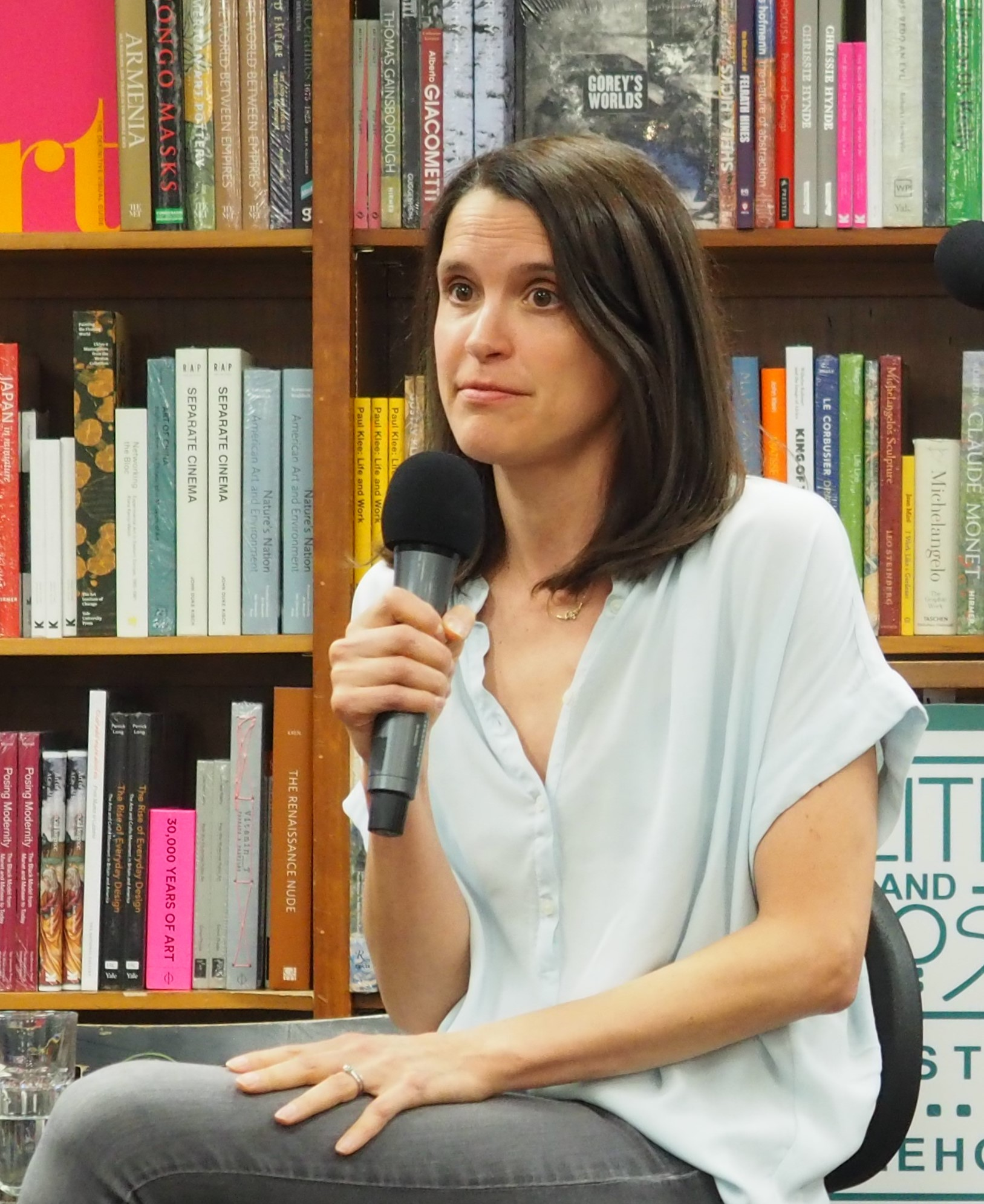
- Freudenberger in 2019
- Born: May 21, 1975 (age 51); New York City, U.S.
- Education: Harvard University (BA), New York University (MFA)
- Occupations: Novelist; short-story writer; essayist
- Writing career
- Notable awards: PEN/Malamud Award 2004 Lucky Girls; Janet Heidinger Kafka Prize 2006 The Dissident
- Website: nellfreudenberger.net

Nell Freudenberger (born April 21, 1975 in New York City) is an American novelist, essayist, and short-story writer.

== Education ==
Freudenberger graduated from Harvard University with a Bachelor of Arts and received a Master of Fine Arts from New York University.

== Career ==
=== Fiction ===
Freudenberger's fiction has appeared in Granta, The Paris Review and The New Yorker. After her collection Lucky Girls was published in 2003, she received the PEN/Malamud Award, a short story prize sponsored by PEN International. When Freudenberger's novel The Dissident appeared in 2006, she received the Janet Heidinger Kafka Prize for Fiction.

In June 2010, Freudenberger was featured along with fellow writers Chimamanda Ngozi Adichie, Karen Russell, ZZ Packer, and Gary Shteyngart in The New Yorker's "20 Under 40 Fiction" issue. Per the magazine, these authors represented "Twenty young writers who capture the inventiveness and the vitality of contemporary American fiction." The list received widespread media attention. She had a MacDowell Fellowship in 2001, 2002, and 2023.

=== Journalism ===
Freudenberger's travel writing has been published in Travel + Leisure, Salon, The New Yorker, and The Telegraph Magazine. She has written book reviews for The New York Times, The New Yorker, Vogue and The Nation.

== Personal life ==
Freudenberger is married and has two children. The family lives in Brooklyn.

== Awards ==
- 2010 The New Yorker, "20 Under 40" Fiction Issue
- 2010 Guggenheim Fellowship
- 2006 Janet Heidinger Kafka Prize for The Dissident
- 2005 Whiting Award for fiction
- 2004 PEN/Malamud Award for Lucky Girls

== Works ==
=== Books ===
- Lucky Girls: Stories. New York: Ecco. 2003. ISBN 978-0-06-008879-8.
- The Dissident. New York: Ecco. 2006. ISBN 978-0-06-075871-4.
- The Newlyweds. New York: Knopf. 2012. ISBN 978-0307268846.
- Lost and Wanted. New York: Knopf. 2019. ISBN 978-0385352680.
- The Limits. New York: Knopf. 2024-04-09. ISBN 978-0-593-44888-5.

=== Short stories and essays ===
- "The Tutor". Granta (82: Life's Like That). Summer 2003. ISBN 978-1-929001-12-5.
- "God and Me". Granta (93: God's Own Countries). Spring 2006. ISBN 978-1-929-00123-1.
- Jack, Ian (Autumn 2007). "The Virgin of Esmeraldas". Granta (99: What Happened Next). ISBN 978-1-929-00129-3.
- Freudenberger, Nell (Winter 2013). "Hover". The Paris Review. Winter 2013 (207).
- Freudenberger, Nell (August 2015). "House of Fire". Harper's. Vol. August 2015.
- Freudenberger, Nell (February 2026) "The Precipice" Harper's. Vol. 352, No. 2109, February 2026.
