= Sarah Shun-lien Bynum =

Chinese American writer (born 1972)

- Born: February 14, 1972 (age 54); Houston, Texas, United States
- Education: Brown University; Iowa Writers' Workshop
- Occupation: Writer
- Relatives: Taylor Ho Bynum (brother)
- Writing career
- Notable awards: Janet Heidinger Kafka Prize (2004); Whiting Award (2005)
- Website: www.sarahshunlienbynum.com

Sarah Shun-lien Bynum (born February 14, 1972) is an American writer, of Chinese descent. She previously taught writing and literature in the graduate MFA writing program at Otis College of Art and Design until 2015. She lives in Los Angeles, California, with her husband and daughter.

== Biography ==
Sarah Shun-lien Bynum was born on February 14, 1972, in Houston, Texas. Her brother is musician Taylor Ho Bynum.

Bynum is a graduate of Brown University and the University of Iowa Writers' Workshop.

== Career ==
Fairy tales are a common theme in many of her works. Bynum describes fairy tales by saying that "they always walk that line between wonder and darkness." Madeleine is Sleeping was published by Harcourt in 2004, was a finalist for the National Book Award, and winner of the Janet Heidinger Kafka Prize. Her short stories, including excerpts from her new novel, have appeared in The New Yorker, Tin House, Triquarterly, The Georgia Review, Alaska Quarterly Review, and in Best American Short Stories. Her second novel, Ms. Hempel Chronicles, was published in September 2008 and was a finalist for the PEN/Faulkner Award in 2009.

In a 2009 book review of Ms. Hempel Chronicles published in the Sunday book review of The New York Times, Josh Emmons notes that Bynum's "prose remains nimble and entertaining, a model of quiet control well suited to its subject" and that the "deftness with which [Ms. Hempel] observes and describes her world and its inhabitants is so engaging that for all its circumspection and regrettable lacunae, “Ms. Hempel Chronicles” works as an account of how nostalgia — both for what was and might have been — can generate a thousand mercies."

In 2010, Bynum was named one of The New Yorker's top "20 Under 40" fiction writers in which the editors note her works "offer idiosyncratic, voice-driven narratives."

In 2017, she was featured in an interview in The New Yorker on surviving adolescence and social media.

== Awards ==
- 2004: Janet Heidinger Kafka Prize for Madeleine is Sleeping
- 2005: Whiting Award for Fiction
- 2020: Finalist for The Story Prize

== Works ==
=== Books ===
- Madeleine is Sleeping. Houghton Mifflin Harcourt. 2004. ISBN 978-0-15101-059-2.
- Ms. Hempel Chronicles. Houghton Mifflin Harcourt. 2008. ISBN 978-0-15101-496-5.

=== Anthologies ===
- "Sandman". Do Me: Tales of Love and Sex from Tin house. Tin House Books. 2007. ISBN 978-0-97941-980-5.
- "The Young Wife's Tale". Fantastic Women: 18 Tales of the Surreal and the Sublime from Tin House. Tin House Books. 2011. ISBN 978-1-93563-910-7.

=== Short stories ===
- "Accomplice." The Georgia Review. Spring 2003.
- "Creep". TriQuarterly. Spring 2005 – via Questia.
- "Yurt". The New Yorker. 21 July 2008.
- "The Erlking". The New Yorker. 5 July 2010.
- "These Are Mysteries". Gulf Coast. Winter/Spring 2011.
- "Christmas, 1990". The Cincinnati Review. Winter 2011.
- "Tell Me My Name". Ploughshares. 121. Emerson College. Fall 2013.
- "The Burglar". The New Yorker. 11 April 2016.
- "Likes". The New Yorker. 9 October 2017.

=== Essays ===
- on Angela Carter's The Bloody Chamber for Amazon: Writers Under the Influence. Fall 2004.
- on Edmund White's A Boy's Own Story for A New Literary History of America. September 2009.
- on Philip Roth's Goodbye, Columbus for Ninth Letter. Spring/Summer 2010.

=== Book reviews ===
- Review of Gautam Malkani's novel Londonstani. The Washington Post. June 2006.

=== Readings ===
- Reading of "Extra" by Yiyun Li with Deborah Treisman for The New Yorker, 2017.
