= Nicole Mones =

American writer (born 1952)

Nicole Mones (born 1952) is an American novelist and food writer.

== Biography ==
As of March 2014 she has published four novels, including Lost in Translation, which appeared in 1998, A Cup of Light (2002), and The Last Chinese Chef, (2007), and in March 2014, "Night in Shanghai. Lost in Translation won the 2000 Janet Heidinger Kafka Prize awarded by the Susan B. Anthony Institute for Gender and Women's Studies and the Department of English at the University of Rochester for best work of fiction by an American woman, and also the Pacific Northwest Annual Book Award, a five-state prize. "The Last Chinese Chef" was the only American finalist for the international Kiriyama Prize and also a World Gourmand Award winner in the Chinese cookbook category, although it is a novel with no recipes. Mones' novels have been translated into at least 17 languages. She also contributes articles about Chinese cuisine to Gourmet magazine, and has written for The New York Times Magazine, The Washington Post, and The Los Angeles Times.

== Biography ==
Mones did business in China for 18 years from 1977, running a textile concern, and all four of her published novels are set mainly in China. In all of them, a love story is entwined around a detailed and accurate description of a facet of Chinese culture: in Lost in Translation, the heroine becomes involved in an archaeological expedition to find the remains of Peking Man; the action of A Cup of Light turns around a rare collection of Chinese porcelain; The Last Chinese Chef, as its name suggests, features Chinese cuisine; and Night in Shanghai is the story of African-American musicians in Shanghai during the jazz age and what happened when World War II exploded around them.

Mones currently lives in Portland, Oregon.

== Novels ==
- Lost in Translation − 1998
- A Cup of Light – 2002
- The Last Chinese Chef – 2007
- Night in Shanghai – 2014

== Non-fiction ==
- "Why Can't They See Things Like We Do?" – Los Angeles Times – May 16, 1999
- "Kitchen Warriors" – Gourmet Magazine – October 2003
- "The Road to Shangri-La" – Gourmet Magazine – June 2007
- "We're Still In Love With the Romance of the Past" – The Washington Post – July 27, 2008
- "Double Happiness" – New York Times Magazine – August 5, 2007

== Interviews ==
- NPR – Weekend Edition – May 6, 2007
- NPR – Weekend Edition – March 8, 2014
- Clear Channel – The Arik Korman Show – April 16, 2014
