= Arthur H. Cash =

American historian

Arthur Hill Cash (February 4, 1922 – December 29, 2016) was an American scholar of 18th-century English literature.

Cash is best known as the author of the definitive two-volume biography of Laurence Sterne, published between 1975 and 1986. He also wrote a popular biography of the 18th-century politician John Wilkes, who was influential in developing ideas concerning civil liberties in England and the United States. The book, titled John Wilkes: The Scandalous Father of Civil Liberty, was one of three finalists for the 2007 Pulitzer Prize for biography.

Cash taught university literature courses for forty-five years, including popular classes in the Bible and Greek and Roman literature. He retired from the State University of New York at New Paltz as one of a handful of faculty with the title of Distinguished Professor. Before that he taught at the University of Colorado, the University of New Mexico, and Colorado State University.

Cash was born in Gary, Indiana, and lived in or near Chicago for many years. Starting work as a stage actor, at the beginning of American involvement in the Second World War, he joined the 108th General Hospital unit. After the war, he enrolled at the University of Chicago on the G.I. Bill, and completed his graduate education at the University of Wisconsin–Madison and Columbia University.

He married Dorothy Moore Cash (later Romni Cash) and they had two children before their divorce. Their eldest son was killed in El Salvador in 1992. He married novelist Mary Gordon and they had two children together, now adults.
