= Marianne Wiggins =

American author (born 1947)

- Born: November 8, 1947 (age 78); Lancaster, Pennsylvania, U.S.
- Occupation: Author
- Spouses: Brian Porzak (m. 1965; div. 1970) Salman Rushdie (m. 1988; div. 1993)
- Writing career
- Genre: Fiction
- Notable works: Separate Checks (1984); John Dollar (1989); Evidence of Things Unseen (2003)
- Notable awards: Whiting Award; NEA Award; Janet Heidinger Kafka Prize

Marianne Wiggins (born November 8, 1947) is an American author. According to The Cambridge Guide to Women's Writing in English, Wiggins writes with "a bold intelligence and an ear for hidden comedy." She has won a Whiting Award, an National Endowment for the Arts award and the Janet Heidinger Kafka Prize. She was a finalist for the Pulitzer Prize in fiction in 2004 for her novel Evidence of Things Unseen.

== Biography ==
Wiggins was born on November 8, 1947, in Lancaster, Pennsylvania. She married Brian Porzak in 1965, with whom she had one daughter. The couple divorced in 1970.

Wiggins lived in London for 16 years, and for brief periods in Paris, Brussels, and Rome. In January 1988, she married novelist Salman Rushdie in London. On February 14, 1989, the Ayatollah Ruhollah Khomeini issued a Fatwa ordering Rushdie's assassination for alleged blasphemy in his book, The Satanic Verses. Although Wiggins had told Rushdie only five days prior that she wished to end their marriage, she nevertheless went into hiding along with him. In 1993, the two divorced.

In 2006, Wiggins lived in Los Angeles, California, where she had been in the English department of the University of Southern California since 2005.

"I have lived a really interesting life. I haven't lived it so I can excavate material for my writing."
"I'm a novelist. I don't have those muscles. It's not about me. It's about what I've imagined. It's the universal voice that I want to move forward. That's my natural voice.

— Marianne Wiggins, July 2006

In 2016, Wiggins suffered a stroke, leaving her unable to read or write. She regained those abilities and completed her novel Properties of Thirst over the course of several years. She was assisted by her daughter Lara Porzak.

== Awards and honors ==
- 1989: Whiting Award
- 1989: Janet Heidinger Kafka Prize for John Dollar
- 2003: Finalist for the National Book Award for Evidence of Things Unseen
- 2004: Finalist for the Pulitzer Prize for Evidence of Things Unseen

== Bibliography ==
=== Novels ===
- Babe, 1975; the story of a single mother.
- Went South, 1980.
- Separate Checks, 1984; a short-story writer recovers from a nervous breakdown.

After this book was published, Wiggins was able to support herself and her daughter from her novels.

- John Dollar, 1989; eight girls, marooned on an island.

Won the Janet Heidinger Kafka Prize for best novel written by an American woman.

- Eveless Eden, 1995; the romance between a war correspondent and a photographer.

Story suggested by then-husband Salman Rushdie.
Shortlisted for 1996 Orange Prize.

- Almost Heaven, 1998.
- Evidence of Things Unseen, 2003; the dawn of the atomic age is seen through the eyes of Fos, an amateur chemist in Kitty Hawk, North Carolina, and Opal, a glassblower's daughter.

Nominated for 2003 National Book Award.
Gold medal for 2004 Commonwealth Club Prize (fiction).
Finalist for 2004 Pulitzer Prize.

- The Shadow Catcher, 2007; a dual narrative threading early life of photographer Edward Curtis and current life of "Marianne Wiggins."
- Properties of Thirst, 2022

=== Collections ===
- Herself in Love and Other Stories, 1987.
  - "Herself in Love," Originally published in Granta 17: While Waiting for a War, August 1985.
- Bet They'll Miss Us When We're Gone, 1991.
