= Valerie Martin =

American writer (born 1948)

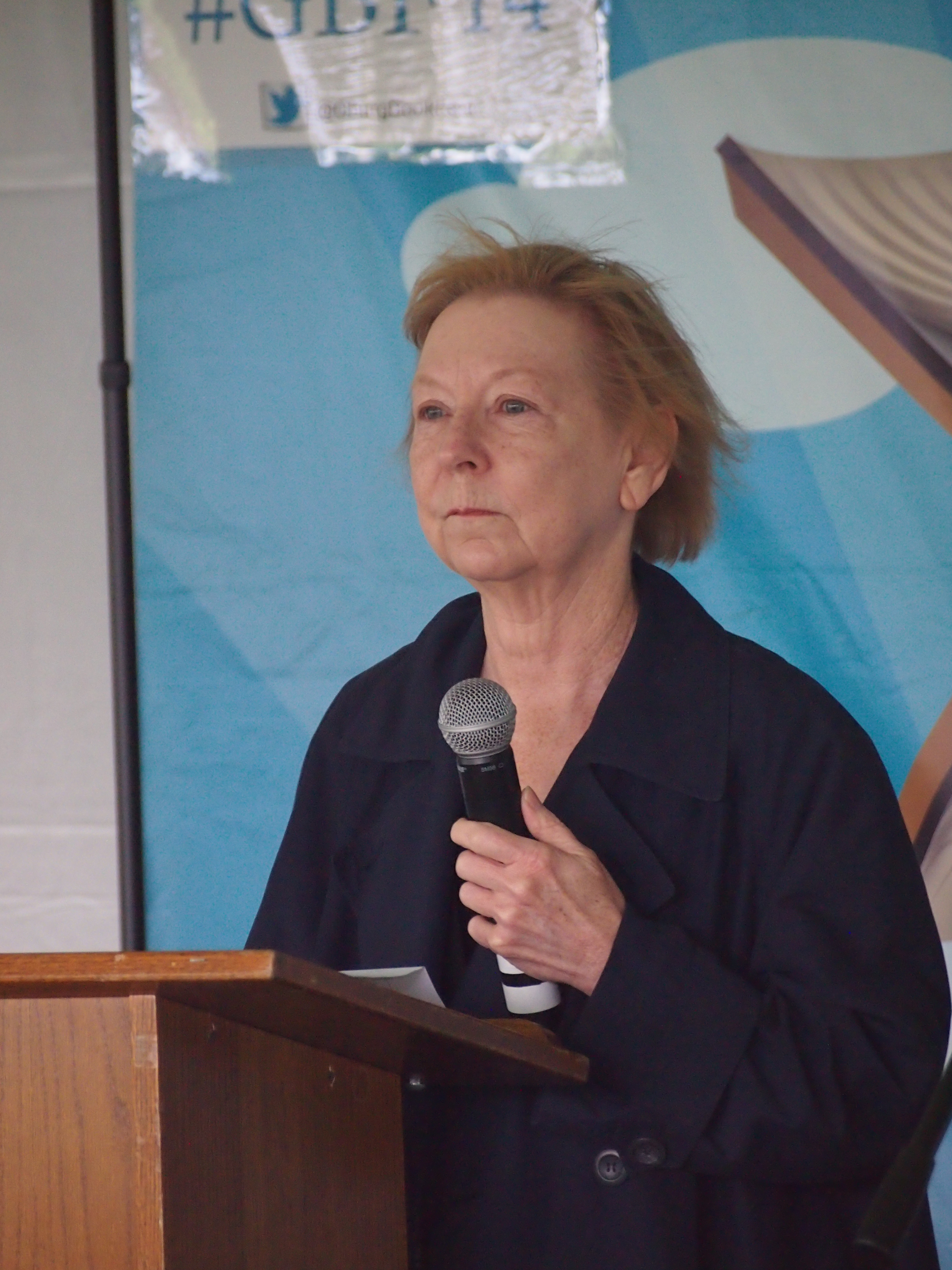
- Martin in 2014
- Born: Valerie Metcalf; March 14, 1948 (age 78); Sedalia, Missouri, U.S.
- Education: University of New Orleans (BA); University of Massachusetts (MFA)
- Occupations: Novelist, short story writer
- Spouse: Robert M. Martin (m. 1970; div. 1984)
- Children: 1
- Writing career
- Language: English
- Notable works: Property; Mary Reilly
- Notable awards: Orange Prize for Fiction; 2003 Property
- Website: valeriemartinonline.com

Valerie Martin (née Metcalf; born March 14, 1948) is an American novelist and short story writer. Her novel Property (2003) won the Orange Prize for Fiction. In 2012, The Observer named Property as one of "The 10 best historical novels".

== Early life ==
Martin was born in Sedalia, Missouri, to John Roger Metcalf and Valerie Fleischer Metcalf. Her father was a sea captain and her mother was a housewife whose family goes back several generations in New Orleans, Louisiana. She was raised in New Orleans from the age of three, attending public elementary school and a Catholic high school (Mount Carmel Academy). She earned a Bachelor of Arts degree from the University of New Orleans in 1970 and graduated from the MFA Program for Poets & Writers at the University of Massachusetts Amherst in 1974. In the 1970s, Martin took a writing course at Loyola University New Orleans taught by Southern novelist Walker Percy.

== Academic career ==
Martin has taught at multiple colleges and universities in the United States, in both visiting and tenure-track positions.

- 1978–1979: University of New Mexico, Las Cruces (visiting lecturer in creative writing)
- 1980–1984 and 1985–1986: University of New Orleans (assistant professor of English)
- 1984–1985: University of Alabama (writer-in-residence/visiting associate professor)
- 1986–1989: Mount Holyoke College (lecturer in creative writing)
- 1989–1997: University of Massachusetts Amherst (associate professor of English)
- 1998–1999: Loyola University New Orleans (visiting writer-in-residence)
- 1999 and 2002: Sarah Lawrence College (visiting writer)
- 2009–present: Mount Holyoke College (professor of English)

While at the University of Alabama, Martin lived a few blocks away from novelist Margaret Atwood and they became friends. Martin was the first person to read the completed manuscript of Atwood's The Handmaid's Tale, claiming she told Atwood that the book would make her rich. Atwood returned the favor and read some of Martin's then-unpublished works, and liked them enough to send them to editor and publisher Nan A. Talese, who has remained Martin's editor ever since.

== Writing career ==
Martin's fictional works include Set in Motion (1978), Alexandra (1979), A Recent Martyr (1987), The Consolation of Nature and Other Stories (1988), The Great Divorce (1993), Italian Fever (1999), The Unfinished Novel and Other Stories (2006), Trespass (2007), and The Confessions of Edward Day (2009). She also wrote a biography of St. Francis of Assisi titled Salvation: Scenes from the Life of St. Francis (2001).

Her 1990 novel, Mary Reilly, a retelling of The Strange Case of Dr. Jekyll and Mr. Hyde from the point of view of a servant in the doctor's house, won the Kafka Prize in 1990 and has been translated into 16 languages. It was released as a film in 1996 by Columbia TriStar Pictures, directed by Stephen Frears and starred John Malkovich as Dr. Jekyll and Julia Roberts as Mary. The short film Surface Calm (2001), directed by Michael Miley, is based on her short story of the same title from her first book, Love (1977).

With her niece, poet Lisa Martin, she has written a trilogy of children's books about cats named Anton and Cecil.

Her historical fiction novel The Ghost of the Mary Celeste, was published in 2014, and Sea Lovers: Selected Stories appeared in 2016. In a 2016 interview, Martin described how Sea Lovers: Selected Stories was greatly inspired by her fear of the sea and the increasing effects of climate change on the natural world.

Martin's 2024 historical fiction novel, Mrs. Gulliver, was published to mixed reviews. One review called the novel "irresistible", but another wrote that it "lacks the punch of Martin's earlier works".

== Personal life ==
She was married to artist Robert M. Martin from 1970 until their divorce in 1984. They had one daughter, Adrienne, born in 1975.

Martin resides in Dutchess County, New York. She lived with her partner, the translator John Cullen, and her cat named Jackson Gray. Cullen died in April 2021. She enjoys gardening.

Martin has continued to teach at the college level even though her writing career has been successful, sometimes taking breaks from the classroom in order to complete a work. She says she needs the social activity of working with young authors to balance the solitary activity that is writing. She initially writes in longhand, later transferring the text to a computer.

== Works ==
=== Novels ===
- Set in Motion (1978)
- Alexandra (1979)
- A Recent Martyr (1987)
- Mary Reilly (1990)
- The Great Divorce (1994)
- Italian Fever (1999)
- Property (2003)
- Trespass (2007)
- The Confessions of Edward Day (2009)
- The Ghost of the Mary Celeste (2014)
- I Give It To You (2020)
- Mrs. Gulliver (2024)

=== Collections ===
- Love: Short Stories (1977)
- The Consolation of Nature, and Other Stories (1988)
- The Unfinished Novel and Other Stories (2006)
- Sea Lovers (2015)

=== Anthologies ===
- "Nemesis" in A Darker Shade of Noir: New Stories of Body Horror by Women Writers (2023)

=== Non-fiction ===
- Salvation: Scenes from the Life of St. Francis (2001)

=== Children's ===
- Anton and Cecil: Cats at Sea (2013)
- Anton and Cecil: Cats on Track (2015)
- Anton and Cecil: Cats Aloft (2016)

== Awards and honors ==
- Louisiana Endowment for the Arts grant (1983)
- Kafka Prize (1990)
- National Education Association award (1990)
- World Fantasy Best Novel nominee (1991): Mary Reilly
- Nebula Best Novel nominee (1991): Mary Reilly
- Orange Broadband Prize for Fiction Best Book winner (2003): Property
- Louisiana Writer Award (2010)
- Guggenheim Fellowship (2011)
