= Edie Meidav =

American novelist

- Born: 1967 (age 58–59); Toronto, Ontario, Canada
- Alma mater: Yale University (BA); Mills College at Northeastern University (MFA)
- Writing career
- Genres: novels, short story
- Notable awards: Janet Heidinger Kafka Prize

Edie Meidav (born 1967) is an American novelist.

== Life ==
She graduated with a B.A. in English/Studio Art at Yale University, and received an M.F.A. at Mills College while studying with Robert Hass. In high school, she attended the College Preparatory School in Oakland, California.

Her works include Kingdom of the Young, a collection of fiction with a nonfiction coda; Lola, California, a novel concerning death penalty, motherhood, female friendship, and the cultural aftermath of 1960s idealism; Crawl Space, a novel written in the voice of a Vichy criminal reckoning with the commodification of wartime memory; The Far Field: A Novel of Ceylon, set in Sri Lanka and concerning the effects of the Western gaze on the East.

Her fiction, poetry, and criticism have appeared in Writing on Air (MIT Press), On Globalization (MIT Press), Now Write! Fiction Writing Exercises from Today's Best Teachers and Writers (Penguin, 2006), and other anthologies, and in Lithub, The Millions, Village Voice, Conjunctions, The American Voice, Ms., The Kenyon Review, The Chattahoochee Review.

The former director of the MFA in Writing and Consciousness, New College of California, San Francisco, she also taught at Lang College New School for Social Research, New York City. A former writer-in-residence at Bard College, in upstate New York, she is now part of the faculty in the MFA at the University of Massachusetts at Amherst. She is on Twitter at lolacalifornia, and on Instagram as meidav. She has two daughters.

== Awards ==
- Fulbright Awards in Sri Lanka and Cyprus
- Howard Fellowship
- Lannan Literary Fellowship (2007)
- Bard Fiction Prize (2005). (2006– )
- Janet Heidinger Kafka Prize for best novel by an American Woman 2001
- Los Angeles Times Best Books of 2001
- Los Angeles Times Best Book of 2006

== Works ==
- Meidav, Edie (2001). The Far Field: A Novel of Ceylon. Houghton Mifflin. ISBN 978-0-618-21916-2. (reprint Harcourt, 2002, ISBN 978-0-618-21916-2 )
- Meidav, Edie (2005). Crawl Space. Farrar, Straus and Giroux. ISBN 978-0-374-13075-6. (reprint Macmillan, 2006, ISBN 978-0-312-42575-3)
- Meidav, Edie (2011). Lola California. Farrar, Straus and Giroux. ISBN 978-0-374-70887-0.
- Meidav, Edie (2017). Kingdom of the Young. Sarabande Books. ISBN 978-1941411414
- Meidav, Edie (2022). Another Love Discourse. MIT Press. ISBN 978-1949597202

=== Criticism ===
- "The Truth in Rented Rooms". The Village Voice. January 19, 1999. Archived from the original on November 7, 2012.

== Reviews ==
Edie Meidav is a student of human bewilderment. In her first novel—about an American called Henry Gould trying to establish a utopian community in the British colony of Ceylon—she's woven the blundering figure of a holy fool into a bristling tapestry of local life. The Far Field is historical fiction without a shred of nostalgia, and even its sometimes predictable plot is finally justified by Meidav's scarifying emotional honesty and visceral sense of place.

But while Meidav's lens is panoramic, she manages to keep her focus human in scale, providing her readers with a virtual novelistic treatise on the colonial experience, articulated in the accumulated tiny, believable details of her characters' daily lives.
