= Eveless Eden =

1995 novel by Marianne Wiggins

- Author: Marianne Wiggins
- Language: English
- Publisher: HarperCollins
- Publication date: October 11, 1995
- Publication place: USA
- Pages: 337

Eveless Eden is a novel by American author Marianne Wiggins, published in 1995 by HarperCollins. The story follows two journalists who fall in love while covering a story in Africa.

== Summary ==
The novel is set in 1986, following the fall of the Berlin Wall. It follows a love triangle between a journalist, a photojournalist, and Romania's minister of trade.

== Reception ==
Eveless Eden received mostly positive reviews. The New York Times praised the novel, saying it was "a work of some genius". The Irish Times said "a great many journalists would give their eye teeth, if they had any, to have written this novel". Publishers Weekly reviewed that the book had "formidable intelligence and momentum." But Kirkus Reviews wrote that the novel's themes were unconvincing.

== Awards ==
Eveless Eden was shortlisted for the Women's Prize for Fiction in 1996.
