= Mary Gordon (writer) =

American writer and scholar

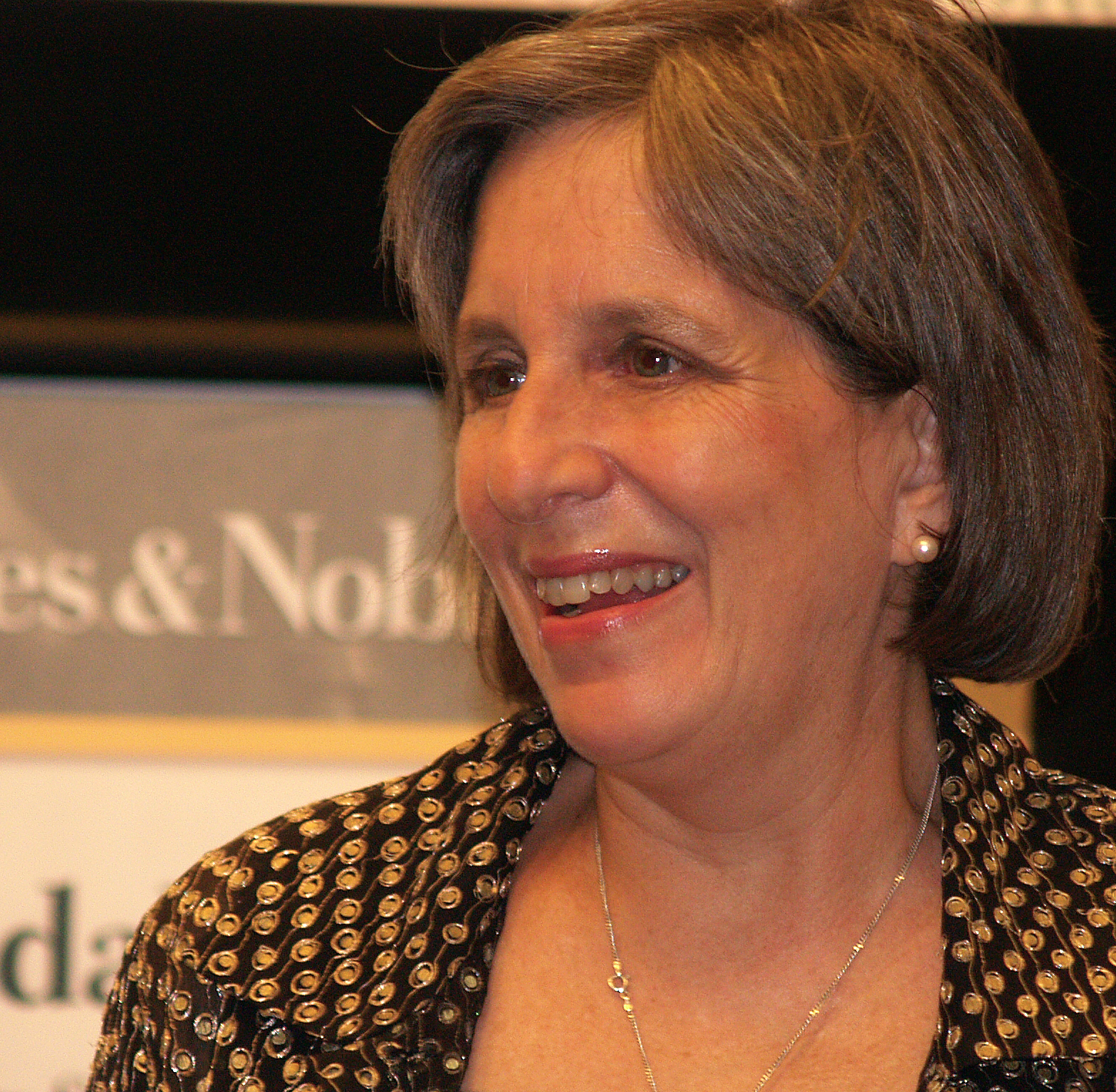
- Born: December 8, 1949 (age 76); Far Rockaway, New York, U.S.
- Education: Barnard College (BA); Syracuse University (MA)
- Occupation: Writer
- Spouse: Arthur H. Cash
- Writing career
- Notable work: The Company of Women

Mary Catherine Gordon (born December 8, 1949) is an American writer from Queens and Valley Stream, New York. She is the McIntosh Professor of English at Barnard College. She is best known for her novels, memoirs and literary criticism. In 2008, she was named Official State Author of New York.

== Early life and education ==
Mary Gordon was born in Far Rockaway, New York, to Anna (Gagliano) Gordon, an Irish-Italian Catholic mother, and David Gordon, who was also Catholic. Her father died in 1957 when she was young. She strongly identified with him and his love for writing and culture, and continued to learn his myths.

After being widowed, her mother Anna moved from Queens with Mary to live with her own mother, who was Irish Catholic, in Valley Stream, a nearby Nassau County suburb. Anna worked as a secretary to support the three of them. Gordon was reared and educated as Catholic, immersed in a largely Irish Catholic neighborhood. She attended Holy Name of Mary School in Valley Stream and The Mary Louis Academy for high school in Jamaica, New York.

Although her mother and her family wanted Gordon to go to a Catholic college, she pursued attending Barnard College and was awarded a scholarship there. She was the first graduate from her high school to go to an Ivy League school; she received her A.B. in 1971. She pursued graduate work, completing an M.A. in English at Syracuse University in 1973.

Gordon published her first novel, Final Payments, in 1978. It became a New York Times bestseller and received a literary prize. She continued to write. It was not until she was in her 40s that Gordon learned very different information about her father. He was born into a Jewish family in Vilna, Lithuania and named Israel. They immigrated to Lorain, Ohio when he was six. He had converted to Catholicism as a young man in 1937, before his marriage to her mother.

After his conversion, her father published some anti-Semitic and right-wing journalism. Gordon's search for information and attempt to reconcile her discoveries with the memory of her beloved father became the basis of her memoir, The Shadow Man: A Daughter's Search for Her Father (1996).

== Career ==
Gordon lived in New Paltz, New York, for a time during the 1980s with her second husband Arthur Cash, a professor of English at the State University of New York at New Paltz. He was a Pulitzer Prize finalist for biography (2007) and was Distinguished Professor of English Emeritus at the time of his death in 2016. They have two adult children, Anna and David.

Gordon currently resides in New York City, where she is McIntosh Professor of English at Barnard College, and in Hope Valley, Rhode Island. Novelist Galaxy Craze has said of Gordon as a teacher at Barnard, "She loves to read; she would read us passages in class and start crying, she's so moved by really good writing. And she was the only good writing teacher at Barnard, so I just kept taking her class over and over. She taught me so much."

Gordon published her first novel, Final Payments, in 1978. In 1981, she wrote the foreword to the Harvest edition of Virginia Woolf's A Room of One's Own.

In 1984, she was one of 97 theologians and religious persons who signed A Catholic Statement on Pluralism and Abortion, calling for religious pluralism and discussion within the Catholic Church regarding the Church's position on abortion.

== Literary works ==
=== Novels ===
- Final Payments (1978) ISBN 0-394-42793-9
- The Company of Women (1981) ISBN 0-394-50508-5
- Men and Angels (1985) ISBN 0-394-52403-9
- The Other Side (1989) ISBN 0-670-82566-2
- Spending (1998) ISBN 0-684-85204-7
- Pearl (2005) ISBN 0-375-42315-X
- The Love of My Youth (2011) ISBN 0-307-37742-3
- There Your Heart Lies (2017) ISBN 0-307-90794-5
- Payback (2020) ISBN 1-524-74922-2

=== Novellas and short story collections ===
- The Rest of Life: Three Novellas (1994) ISBN 0-14-014907-4
- Temporary Shelter (1987) ISBN 0-394-55520-1
- The Stories of Mary Gordon (2006) ISBN 0-375-42316-8 (collects Temporary Shelter and 22 previously uncollected stories)
- The Liar's Wife (2014) ISBN 978-0-307-37743-2

=== Non-fiction ===
- Memoirs
  - The Shadow Man: A Daughter's Search For Her Father (1996) ISBN 0-679-74931-4
  - Seeing Through Places: Reflections on Geography and Identity (2000) ISBN 0-684-86255-7
  - Circling My Mother: A Memoir (2007) ISBN 0-375-42456-3
- Essays
  - Good Boys and Dead Girls, and Other Essays (1991) ISBN 0-670-82567-0
- Religion
  - Reading Jesus (2009) ISBN 0-375-42457-1
  - On Thomas Merton (2018) ISBN 978-1-6118-0337-2
- Biography
  - Joan of Arc (2000) ISBN 0-670-88537-1
  - On Merton. Shambhala Publications. 2019. ISBN 978-1-6118-0337-2. Archived from the original on August 8, 2019.

== Prizes and awards ==
She won the Janet Heidinger Kafka Prize in 1978 for her debut novel, Final Payments, and in 1981 for her second novel, The Company of Women.

In 1993, Gordon received a Guggenheim Fellowship. Her other awards include a Lila Wallace–Reader's Digest Writers' Award, an O. Henry Award, and Academy Award for Literature from the American Academy of Arts and Letters.

The Stories of Mary Gordon won The Story Prize in 2007. In March 2008, Governor Eliot Spitzer named Mary Gordon the official New York State Author and gave her the Edith Wharton Citation of Merit for Fiction. In 2010 she was inducted as a member of the inaugural class of the New York Writers Hall of Fame.
