= Alexandria Constantinova Szeman =

American novelist (born 1956)

- Born: Cheryl Lynn Clemans; June 18, 1956 (age 70); Dayton, Ohio, U.S.
- Education: Wright State University (BA, MA); University of Cincinnati (PhD)
- Occupation: Author
- Parent(s): James Lee Clemans; Patricia Eileen Donovan Clemans
- Writing career
- Pen name: Sherri Szeman

Alexandria Constantinova Szeman (born Cheryl Lynn Clemans; 18 June 1956) is an American author of literary fiction (novels and short stories), poetry, true crime, memoir, and nonfiction. Her poetry and first three books were originally published under the pseudonym Sherri Szeman.

== Early life ==
Alexandria Constantinova Szeman was born Cheryl Lynn Clemans to Patricia Eileen Donovan Clemans and James Lee Clemans, in Dayton, Ohio. She was adopted by her stepfather Edward Anthony Szeman in 1971 at the age of 15. At that time, Szeman changed her name to Sherri. In 2005, Szeman changed her name to Alexandria Constantinova Szeman.

== Education ==
Szeman graduated with a Bachelor of Arts in English Literature, minor in Art History, from Wright State University in 1978, and a Master's of Art in English Literature, with concentrations in Linguistics, and in History of the English Language, from Wright State University in 1980. She earned a Ph.D. in Comparative and World Literature and Creative Writing from the University of Cincinnati in 1986.

== Teaching career ==
In 1985, she was hired at Central State University (Wilberforce OH), an Historically Black University or College (HBCU). She was a Professor of English and World Literature, Creative Writing, and Professional & Technical Writing at Central State until 1999, when she became a Professor of Creative Writing, World Literature, and Technical Writing at Clark State Community College (Springfield OH).

== Writing career ==
Szeman began her writing career as a poet, and her work was widely published in university journals and literary magazines. Her dissertation was a collection of original poetry, with all the poems published or accepted for publication before her defense. She has published novels, short stories, essays, and other genres.

== The Kommandant's Mistress ==
Her first novel, The Kommandant's Mistress, was published by HarperCollins in 1993, and by HarperPerennial in 1994. The novel was widely critically acclaimed. It was reviewed in the New York Times Book Review and chosen as a Notable Book. It was awarded the University of Rochester's Janet Heidinger Kafka Prize for "the outstanding book of prose fiction by an American woman," and The Talmadge McKinney Award for Excellence in Research (Central State University, 1994). The Kommandant's Mistress received a starred review in Publishers Weekly, indicating a "book of outstanding merit." Favorable reviews appeared in The New Yorker, USA Today, Glamour, Newsday, Kirkus Reviews, Library Journal, and The San Francisco Chronicle. The novel was sold to publishers in France (Albin Michel), Spain and Latin America (Seix Barrel), Russia, Japan, Norway, Sweden, Denmark, Latvia, and Lithuania.

== Awards ==
- Honorable Mention, Unrhymed Poetry, Writer's Digest National Writing Competition, 1980
- Elliston Poetry Prize, Grand Prize, University of Cincinnati, 1983
- Elliston Poetry Prize, 1st Prize, University of Cincinnati, 1984
- Elliston Poetry Prize, 2nd Prize, University of Cincinnati, 1985
- Michigan State University's The Centennial Review Michael Miller Award for Poetry, "Penelope to Ulysses," 1985
- Honorable Mention, Chester H. Jones Poetry Foundation National Poetry Competition, 1985
- Isabel and Mary Neff Fellowship for Creative Writing, College of Arts and Sciences, University of Cincinnati, 1985-1986
- Janet Heidinger Kafka Prize, The Kommandant's Mistress, University of Rochester, 1994
- Third Prize, Seven Deadly Sins Contest, Story Magazine, 1995
- Grand Prize Naked, with Glasses. UKA [United Kingdom Authors] Press International Writing Competition, 2007

== Published books ==
=== as Alexandria Constantinova Szeman ===
- The Kommandant's Mistress 2012 (Revised and Updated, 20th Anniversary Edition)
- Only with the Heart 2012 (Revised and Expanded, Legally and Medically Updated, 12th Anniversary Edition)
- Where Lightning Strikes: Poems on The Holocaust 2012
- Love in the Time of Dinosaurs 2012
- Naked, with Glasses 2013
- M is for Munchers: The Serial Killers Next Door 2014
- Love is a Many Zombied Thing 2015

=== as Sherri Szeman ===
- The Kommandant's Mistress 1993 (1st edition) This novel won the Janet Heidinger Kafka Prize in 1993, which has been awarded annually since 1975.
- The Kommandant's Mistress 2000 (2nd edition, includes Verdi opera translations)
- Only with the Heart 2000
- Mastering Point of View 2001
