= Mary Reilly (film) =

1996 film by Stephen Frears

- Theatrical release poster
- Directed by: Stephen Frears
- Written by: Christopher Hampton
- Based on: Mary Reilly by Valerie Martin
- Produced by: Norma Heyman; Ned Tanen; Nancy Graham Tanen
- Starring: Julia Roberts; John Malkovich; George Cole; Michael Gambon; Glenn Close
- Cinematography: Philippe Rousselot
- Edited by: Lesley Walker
- Music by: George Fenton
- Production company: TriStar Pictures
- Distributed by: Sony Pictures Releasing
- Release date: February 23, 1996 (United States)
- Running time: 108 minutes
- Country: United States
- Language: English
- Budget: $47 million
- Box office: $12.9 million

Mary Reilly is a 1996 American Gothic horror film directed by Stephen Frears and starring Julia Roberts and John Malkovich. It was written by Christopher Hampton and adapted from the 1990 novel of the same name by Valerie Martin (itself inspired by Robert Louis Stevenson's 1886 novella Strange Case of Dr Jekyll and Mr Hyde).

It reunited director Frears, screenwriter Hampton, and actors Malkovich and Glenn Close, who were involved in the Oscar-winning Dangerous Liaisons (1988).

Mary Reilly was theatrically released by Sony Pictures Releasing on February 23, 1996 to poor reviews. It was a box office bomb, making just $12.9 million against its $47 million budget.

== Plot summary ==
Mary Reilly comes to work as a maid in the household of Dr. Henry Jekyll. She and Jekyll develop a rapport and he begins to call on her for assistance, to the consternation of his butler, Poole. Jekyll is fascinated by scars Mary bears on her hand and neck, which she reluctantly allows him to examine, explaining they are from a childhood incident where her abusive father locked her in a cupboard with live rats. The staff begin to notice the doctor throwing himself into his work at odd hours, culminating in his announcement that he has hired an assistant, Edward Hyde, who is to be given full run of the household.

One night, waking from a nightmare, Mary sees Hyde leaving the house, follows him, and witnesses him paying off—with a cheque signed by Jekyll—the family of a young girl he has savagely beaten. Hyde later approaches her in the Doctor's library, crudely propositioning her and making taunting references to her relationship with her father. Mary is equally fascinated and repulsed by him.

On an errand to deliver a letter from Jekyll to Mrs. Faraday, a madam, Mary learns that a bloody mess at the whorehouse was caused by Mr. Hyde. Mrs. Faraday arrives at Jekyll's home, insists on seeing him and demands more money for her continued silence. While watering the garden, Mary notices the lights in the laboratory go out and, investigating, discovers a small pool of blood on the theater table. She leaves, not noticing Hyde disposing of Mrs. Faraday's severed head.

Mary returns home to plan her mother's funeral. As she returns to Jekyll's house, Hyde grabs her in the alley and forces her into an embrace; he is being pursued by the police. He tells her that he supposes she won't see him again before kissing her and disappearing. Eventually the police question Mary about the murder of Sir Danvers Carew, a friend of Jekyll's and a Member of Parliament, and she denies having seen Hyde that day. Jekyll later warns Mary that she should not have lied to the police. In any case, because the public killing of Carew cannot be "easily swept under the carpet", Hyde must leave London; that is why, Jekyll explains, he has bribed and made Hyde swear to disappear forever.

Days later, Mary is surprised to discover Hyde in the doctor's bed. When she tries to raise the alarm, he stops her and explains that, as a cure for depression, Jekyll injects himself with a serum that transforms him into Hyde, who later injects the "antidote" to resume being Jekyll. Hyde says he now has the ability to appear without the aid of the serum, and tries to persuade her to have sex with him. Mary is shocked, finding all of this hard to believe; he lets her go before turning himself back into Jekyll.

Jekyll sends Poole to a chemist's to analyze an impure drug and recreate it, telling him that it is a matter of life and death. Jekyll then asks Mary to prepare a room for him in his laboratory, where he plans to spend most of his time. Poole returns, having not been able to retrieve a satisfactory sample of the drug. Mary visits the laboratory, where she hears Jekyll sobbing, but quietly retreats.

Mary packs to leave during the night, but on her way out, she decides to visit the lab. There Hyde attacks her and holds a knife to her throat, but he cannot bring himself to kill her. He then injects himself with the antidote, and Mary is forced to witness the horrific transformation of one man into the other. Jekyll reveals that Hyde has mixed a poison with the antidote, and then dies in Mary's arms. In the morning, Jekyll, although dead, has transformed into Hyde one last time, as Mary walks into the fog.

== Cast ==
- Julia Roberts as Mary Reilly
  - Sasha Hanau as young Mary Reilly
- John Malkovich as Dr. Henry Jekyll / Edward Hyde
- Michael Sheen as Bradshaw
- George Cole as Mr. Poole
- Kathy Staff as Mrs. Kent
- Bronagh Gallagher as Annie
- Glenn Close as Mrs. Faraday
- Michael Gambon as Mr. Reilly
- Linda Bassett as Mrs. Reilly
- Henry Goodman as Haffinger
- Ciarán Hinds as Sir Danvers Carew
- Tim Barlow as the Vicar
- Stephen Boxer as the Inspector
- Bob Mason as the Policeman
- Isabella Marsh as Screaming Girl
- Richard Leaf and Wendy Nottingham as Screaming Girl's parents
- Ellie Crockett, Robbi Stevens, Kadamba Simmons, Evelyn Doggart, Pui Fan Lee, Mimi Potworowska, Samantha Hones and Julia Hagen as Farraday Girls

== Production ==
Producers Jon Peters and Peter Guber acquired the film rights to Mary Reilly in 1989, and optioned them for Warner Bros. with Roman Polanski as director. When Guber became CEO of Sony Pictures Entertainment later that year, he moved Mary Reilly to Sony's sister company, TriStar Pictures, where Tim Burton was approached to direct with Denise Di Novi to produce in 1991. Christopher Hampton was hired to write the screenplay, and Burton signed on as director in January 1993, after he approved Hampton's rewrite.

Burton intended to start filming in January 1994 with Winona Ryder in the leading role, after he completed filming Ed Wood. However, Burton dropped out in May 1993 over his anger against Guber for putting Ed Wood in turnaround. Stephen Frears was TriStar's first choice to replace Burton, and Di Novi was fired and replaced with Ned Tanen. Daniel Day-Lewis was TriStar's first choice for the role of Dr. Jekyll and Uma Thurman for the role of Mary.

Principal photography was reported to begin in the spring of 1994. The script would undergo as many as 25 drafts and Frears shot three different potential endings. Frears wanted to go with a more ambiguous ending, but the studio and test audiences reacted to this version negatively as they saw it as too "downbeat". TriStar then hired a different editor to edit Frears' cut, but when test audiences' reactions did not improve with this newer version, they reverted back to Frears' original cut.

== Release ==
=== Box office ===
After multiple delays and changes to its release date, the film premiered on 23 February 1996 in the United States. Reports of alleged production delays and animosity between the actors helped fuel poor word-of-mouth preceding the film's release. Domestically, the film earned $5.7 million. As international markets released it throughout the spring and summer of 1996, it would take in only an additional $6.6 million. Ultimately, the film grossed just $12.3 million worldwide on a reported budget of $40 million. Audiences surveyed by CinemaScore gave the film a grade of C on a scale of A+ to F.

Of the film's poor commercial performance, an unnamed source close to the production said TriStar allowed the film to become "too big, too expensive, too Hollywood", and once the production began attracting major talent, "a dark little film turned into a dark, big film that was unlikely to justify its cost."

=== Home media ===
The film was released on VHS on August 27, 1996, Laserdisc on October 8, 1996, and DVD on September 12, 2000 by Columbia TriStar Home Video. The film was released on Blu-ray on October 3, 2017 by Mill Creek Entertainment.

== Reception ==
=== Critical response ===
Mary Reilly holds a 26% approval rating on Rotten Tomatoes, based on 43 reviews, with an average rating of 4.3/10. The website's critical consensus states: "Mary Reilly looks good and has its moments but overall, the movie borders on boredom." On Metacritic, the film has a score of 44 based on 22 critics' reviews, indicating "mixed or average reviews". Criticisms expressed the film lacked suspense and chemistry between its leads. David Ansen of Newsweek wrote, "Overtly Freudian (not for nothing is Mary first seen bearing a squirming eel into the kitchen), the movie wants to explore the dark alleys of Victorian sexuality, with Jekyll as Superego and Hyde as Id, and Mary caught in the middle, confronting her primal horror. This isn't dumb, but it plays out as academically as it sounds, without a shred of true terror and with only the most muted sexual charge." Entertainment Weekly's Owen Gleiberman commented, "Instead of tapping the theatrical heart of the material, Frears and Hampton reduce the three major characters to drawing-room stiffs who sit around explaining their passion instead of acting on it."

Janet Maslin of The New York Times observed, "Clearly Ms. Roberts has the makings of a serious actress and the wherewithal to become one, but Mary Reilly offers a vehicle that is unrelievedly grim. The greatest demands placed on her here are sustaining a brogue and pronouncing 'laboratory' with the emphasis on the second syllable."

Gene Siskel and Roger Ebert were some of the few critics who could muster praise for the film, collectively giving it two thumbs up. In his written review, Ebert awarded it three out of four stars, feeling the story "is in some ways more faithful to the spirit of Robert Louis Stevenson's original story than any of the earlier films based on it, because it's true to the underlying horror. This film is not about makeup or special effects, or Hyde turning into the Wolf Man. It's about a powerless young woman who feels sympathy for one side of a man's nature, and horror of the other". On their syndicated review series Siskel & Ebert, Siskel described the film as "a touching love story in a marvelous production". He compared it favorably to Frears' Prick Up Your Ears, feeling both films showed the director's affinity for the marginal characters in society. He went on to say that “he sees [Mary Reilly] as a marginal character … and also [Dr. Jekyll], who has to hide his passion".

Multiple critics said Roberts and Malkovich were "miscast". Ebert disagreed with these stances, deeming the performances "subtle and well-controlled", noting Malkovich in particular as "quiet but simmering with anger".

Roberts was nominated for Worst Actress by the Razzie Awards, and Frears was nominated for Worst Director. Both "lost" to Demi Moore and Andrew Bergman, respectively, for Striptease. The Stinkers also nominated Roberts for Worst Actress; she "lost" to Whoopi Goldberg in a one-woman three-way-tie for Eddie, Bogus, and Theodore Rex. The film was also entered in the 46th Berlin International Film Festival.

Critic David Thomson, in his 2008 book Have You Seen...?: A Personal Introduction to 1,000 Films, states that "this is the best version of the Jekyll and Hyde story ever put on screen — and it is a wonderful movie". After wryly acknowledging the "Razzie" awards, he comments that "I can see how this was less than commercial, but the neglect of the film by real critics is shocking". He further praises Hampton's script as "a great piece of work", Roberts' performance as "commit[ed]", "remarkable and delicate", director Frears' "intelligence" and the "brilliant art direction".
