= Italian Fever =

1999 mystery novel by Valerie Martin

- First edition cover
- Author: Valerie Martin
- Publisher: Alfred A. Knopf
- Publication date: July 1, 1999
- ISBN: 0-375-40542-9

Italian Fever is 1999 mystery novel by Valerie Martin.

== Plot summary ==
Part romance and part mystery, it tells the story of New Yorker Lucy Stark, who travels to Tuscany to wind up the affairs of her late boss – a writer named DV, who has died after falling down a well while staying at a remote villa. Lucy's job begins as a grim task, but a series of events and revelations during her stay in Italy start to provide her with an insight into DV, and ultimately help her to gain a greater understanding of herself.

Lucy Stark is the assistant to DV, a bestselling writer who dies under suspicious circumstances while staying in Tuscany, Italy. Lucy travels to Italy to investigate his death, looking into whether he was murdered or if his final, unfinished ghost story was connected to a real-world threat. During her investigation, she also becomes romantically involved with a married local man named Massimo.
