= The Company of Women (Gordon novel) =

1981 novel by Mary Gordon

The Company of Women (1981) is a novel by American author Mary Gordon. It is a coming-of-age story that details the sheltered upbringing of a well-educated Catholic girl named Felicitas, and how her values are challenged and altered by the turbulence of the 1960s protest movement. The book earned Gordon a second Janet Heidinger Kafka Prize. It was published by Random House.

== Plot ==
Father Cyprian is a Catholic priest whose parishioners include five women. These five form a circle of friendship. Among them is a child, Felicitas Maria Taylor, a serious-minded girl with no use for boys, dating, or fun. Rather, she dreams of the day she can become a great writer like Jane Austen. Felicitas develops as a composite of the older women.
