= Susan Hubbard =

American novelist

- Born: New York
- Occupations: Writer, professor
- Website: Susan Hubbard website

Susan Hubbard is an American fiction writer and professor emerita at the University of Central Florida. She has written seven books of fiction, and is a winner of the Associated Writing Program Prize for Short Fiction and the Janet Heidinger Kafka Prize for best prose book of the year by an American woman.

== Biography ==
She has co-edited a fiction anthology, 100% Pure Florida Fiction (University Press of Florida) and has written more than 30 short stories published in nationally and internationally circulated journals, including Ploughshares, TriQuarterly, and Mississippi Review. Her writing has been published in more than fifteen countries, including Australia, England, France, Germany, the Netherlands, Indonesia, Italy, Portugal, Spain, and Taiwan, and has been taught across America and in the United Kingdom.

Hubbard has also received teaching awards from Syracuse University, Cornell University, and the South Atlantic Administrators of Departments of English. She has been a Writer in Residence at Georgia College & State University, Milledgeville, GA; Armstrong Atlantic State University, Savannah, GA; Pitzer College, Claremont, CA; and The National Writer's Voice, Tampa. She has been a guest at Yaddo, the Djerassi Resident Artists Project, Virginia Center for Creative Arts, and Cill Rialaig. She has given more than 100 public readings and addresses on the craft of writing.

She is a native of upstate New York.

== Bibliography ==
=== The Society Of S ===
- The Society of S. Simon and Schuster. 2008. ISBN 978-1-4165-3458-7.
- The Year of Disappearances. Simon and Schuster. 2009. ISBN 978-1-4165-5271-0.
- The Season of Risks. Simon and Schuster. 2010. ISBN 978-1-4391-8342-7.

=== Various ===
- Walking on Ice. University of Missouri Press. 1990. ISBN 978-0-8262-0752-4. "Susan Hubbard."
- Blue Money. University of Missouri Press. 1999. ISBN 978-0-8262-1210-8. "Susan Hubbard."
- Lisa Maria's Guide for the Perplexed. Red Dress Ink, 2004. ISBN 978-0-373-25061-5
- Lisa Maria Takes Off. Red Dress Ink, 2005. ISBN 978-0-373-89517-5

=== Editor ===
- Susan Hubbard; Robley Wilson, eds. (2000). 100% pure Florida fiction: an anthology. University Press of Florida. ISBN 978-0-8130-1753-2.
