= Property (novel) =

2003 novel by Valerie Martin

- First edition cover
- Author: Valerie Martin
- Publisher: Doubleday
- Publication date: February 2003
- ISBN: 0-385-50408-X

Property is a 2003 novel by American writer Valerie Martin. In 2003, it won the Orange Prize, and in 2012, The Observer named Property as one of "The 10 best historical novels".

== Plot summary ==
The book is set on a sugar plantation near New Orleans in 1828, and tells the story of Manon Gaudet, the wife of the plantation's owner, and Sarah, the slave Manon was given as a wedding present and who she has brought with her from the city. The story is centred on Manon and her resentment of Sarah. Sarah is not only Manon's slave, but also her husband's sex slave. The private drama of the estate is played out against the backdrop of civil unrest and slave rebellion.

== Critical analyses ==
- Tim A. Ryan, "Mammy and Scarlett Done Gone: Complications of the Contemporary Novel of Slavery, 1986-2003." Calls and Responses: The American Novel of Slavery Since Gone with the Wind. Baton Rouge: Louisiana State UP, 2008: 149–84.
