= Ru Freeman =

Sri Lankan born writer and activist

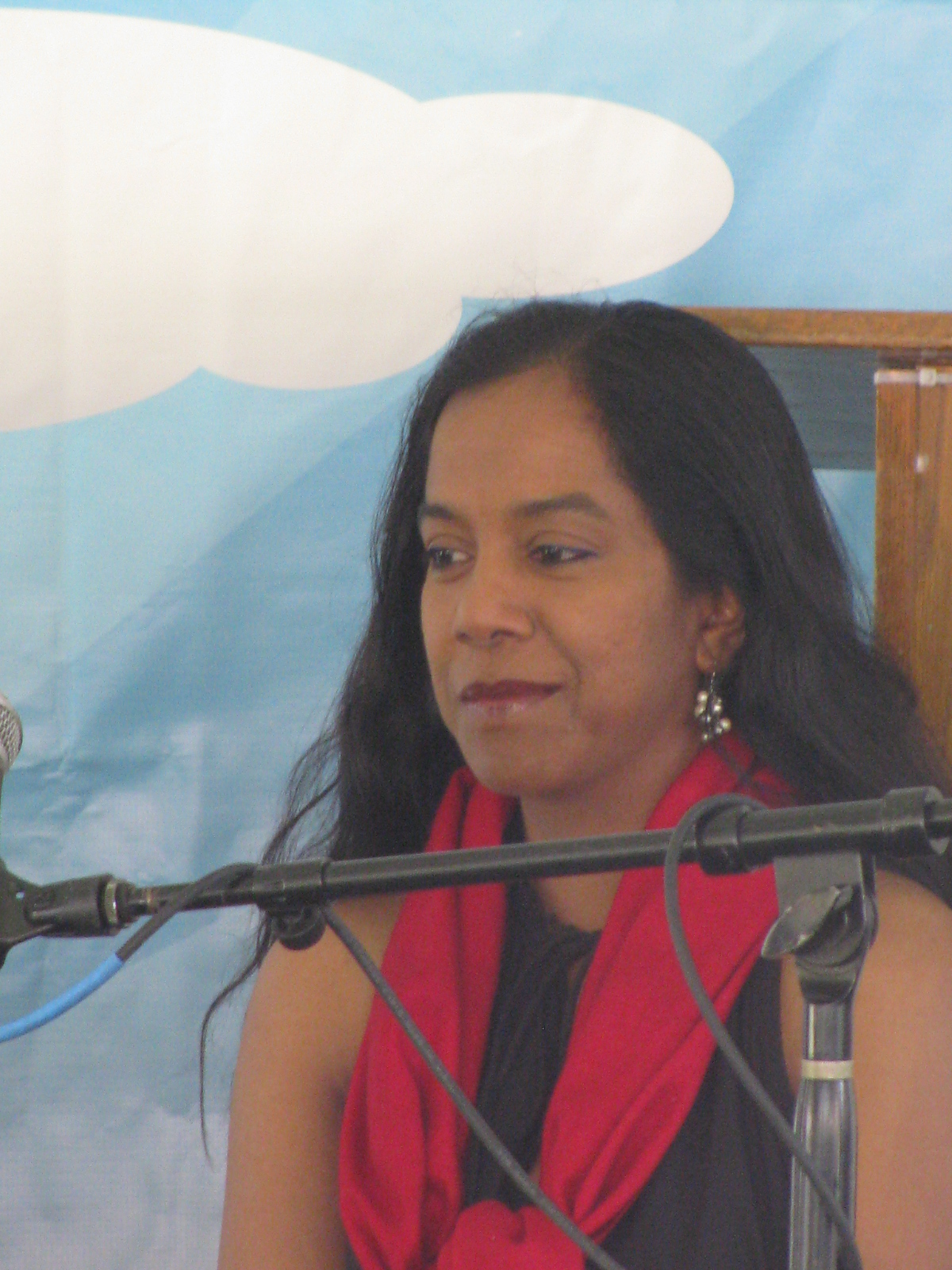
- Born: Colombo, Sri Lanka
- Citizenship: Sri Lankan and American
- Education: Murdoch University
- Alma mater: Bates College; University of Colombo
- Occupation: Writer
- Relatives: Arjuna Seneviratne, Malinda Seneviratne (Brothers) Gamini Seneviratne (Father) Ingrain Seneviratne (mother, dec.)
- Writing career
- Language: Sinhala, English, French
- Genres: Prose, Poetry, Journalism
- Website: rufreeman.com

Ru Freeman is a Sri Lankan born writer and activist whose creative and political work has appeared internationally, including in the UK Guardian, The Boston Globe, and the New York Times. She is the author of the novels A Disobedient Girl (Atria/Simon & Schuster, 2009), and On Sal Mal Lane (Graywolf Press), a NYT Editor’s Choice Book. Both novels have been translated into multiple languages including Italian, French, Turkish, Dutch, and Chinese. She is editor of the anthology, Extraordinary Rendition: (American) Writers on Palestine (OR Books, 2015 and Interlink, 2016), a collection of the voices of 65 American poets and writers speaking about America’s dis/engagement with Palestine, and co-editor of the anthology, Indivisible: Global Leaders on Shared Security (Interlink, 2019). She holds a graduate degree in labor studies, researching female migrant labor in the countries of Kuwait, the U.A.E, and the Kingdom of Saudi Arabia, and has worked at the Institute for Policy Studies in Washington, DC, in the South Asia office of the American Federation of Labor-Congress of Industrial Organizations (AFL/CIO), and the American Friends Service Committee in their humanitarian and disaster relief programs. She is a contributing editorial board member of the Asian American Literary Review, and a fellow of the Bread Loaf Writer’s Conference, Yaddo, Hedgebrook, the Virginia Center for the Creative Arts and the Lannan Foundation. She is the 2014 winner of the Janet Heidinger Kafka Prize for Fiction by an American Woman. She writes for the Huffington Post on books and politics.

== Life ==
Ru Freeman was born in Colombo. She studied at Murdoch University and graduated from Bates College with a BA, and from the University of Colombo.

Her work has appeared in Huffington Post, Guernica, Story Quarterly, VQR, Crab Orchard Review, Narrative, World Literature Today, Post Road, Confessions: Fact or Fiction?.

In 2009, Freeman attacked the Indian novelist Arundhati Roy for her views on the Sri Lankan civil conflict and stated that the government of Mahinda Rajapaksa was "doing its best to assist the civilians who have lived for the past 25 years under the LTTE", a Tamil separatist group known as the Tamil Tigers. According to Meenakshi Ganguly, Deputy Asia Director of Human Rights Watch, "thousands of civilians who emerged from the conflict zone were detained in camps where the security forces committed torture, rape and enforced disappearances . . . Rajapaksa pursued policies hostile to ethnic and religious minorities, and repressed those seeking justice for abuses committed during the civil war."

She teaches at Columbia University.

== Works ==
- A Disobedient Girl: A Novel. Simon and Schuster. 21 July 2009. ISBN 978-1-4391-0195-7.
- On Sal Mal Lane. House of Anansi Press Incorporated. 29 April 2013. ISBN 978-1-77089-356-6.
