= Mary Reilly (novel) =

1990 novel by Valerie Martin

- First edition
- Author: Valerie Martin
- Language: English
- Publisher: Doubleday
- Publication date: 1990
- Publication place: United Kingdom
- Media type: Print (Hardcover & Paperback)
- Pages: 263
- ISBN: 0-385-24968-3
- OCLC: 20220341
- Dewey Decimal: 813/.54 20
- LC Class: PS3563.A7295 M37 1990

Mary Reilly is a 1990 parallel novel by American writer Valerie Martin. It is inspired by Robert Louis Stevenson's classic 1886 novella Strange Case of Dr. Jekyll and Mr. Hyde. It was nominated for the Nebula Award for Best Novel in 1990 and the World Fantasy Award for Best Novel in 1991. Martin's novel was the basis for the 1996 film of the same name starring Julia Roberts in the title role.

== Plot introduction ==
The novel is about a young girl working at the home of Dr. Henry Jekyll who falls in love with her master. Jekyll's "assistant", Edward Hyde, is generally considered her nemesis. Mary Reilly adds more details and substance to the original book, Strange Case of Dr. Jekyll and Mr. Hyde, by telling the story from the unique perspective of the housemaid, Mary Reilly.

== Reception ==
John Crowley in The New York Times called it "an achievement - creativity skating exhilaratingly on thin ice" and wrote that Martin's "treatment of his story actually succeeds in ways Stevenson himself could not have brought off and might well have admired." Kirkus Reviews wrote: "Weakened slightly by a Hyde who rampages mostly off-page, lessening his monstrousness--here's a rare novel where a bit more explicit violence might have proved more rather than less artful--but wholly captivating both in its detailed re-creation of Victorian upstairs/downstairs life and the slums beyond, and in its wise measuring of Mary's soul." Judith Freeman of the Los Angeles Times wrote that the novel "deserves to become a companion of its inspiration" as both novels "fit together like two hands whose fingers are intertwined." Freeman further wrote that the "amazing skill of Valerie Martin is how she takes details from Stevenson’s story and recasts them on the page: She fills in the blanks; she tells you the “other” side."
