= List of novellas =

Novellas are works of prose fiction longer than a short story but shorter than a novel. Several novellas have been recognized as among the best examples of the literary form. Publishers and literary award societies typically consider a novella's word count to be between 17,000 and 40,000 words.

== Major novellas ==
Certain novellas have been recognized as some of the best examples of the literary form, through their appearance on multiple best-of lists.

Author	Title	Published	References
Albert Camus	The Stranger	1942	
Truman Capote	Breakfast at Tiffany's	1958	
Joseph Conrad	Heart of Darkness	1899	
Charles Dickens	A Christmas Carol	1843	
Ernest Hemingway	The Old Man and the Sea	1952	
Franz Kafka	The Metamorphosis	1915	
Richard Matheson	I Am Legend	1954	
Herman Melville	Billy Budd	1924	
George Orwell	Animal Farm	1945	
Philip Roth	Goodbye, Columbus	1959	
John Steinbeck	Of Mice and Men	1937	
Robert Louis Stevenson	Strange Case of Dr Jekyll and Mr Hyde	1886	
Edith Wharton	Ethan Frome	1911	

== Other notable novellas ==
Additionally, several novellas have been included on at least one best-of list.

Author	Title	Published	Reference
Julian Barnes	The Sense of an Ending	2011	
Saul Bellow	Seize the Day	1956	
Kate Chopin	The Awakening	1899	"Novellas by women, about women".
Paulo Coelho	The Alchemist	1988	
Maryse Condé	I, Tituba: Black Witch of Salem	1986	
Don DeLillo	Pafko at the Wall	2001	
Fyodor Dostoyevsky	The Gambler	1867	
Joseph von Eichendorff	Memoirs of a Good-for-Nothing	1826	
George Eliot	Silas Marner	1861	
Nora Ephron	Heartburn	1983	
Penelope Fitzgerald	The Bookshop	1978	
Gabriel García Márquez	Chronicle of a Death Foretold	1981	
Gabriel García Márquez	No One Writes to the Colonel	1961	
Graham Greene	The Tenth Man	1985	
M. K. Indira	Phaniyamma	1977	
Shirley Jackson	We Have Always Lived in the Castle	1962	
Henry James	The Aspern Papers	1888	
Henry James	Daisy Miller	1879	
Henry James	The Turn of the Screw	1898	
Tove Jansson	The Summer Book	1972	
Sarah Orne Jewett	The Country of the Pointed Firs	1896	
James Joyce	The Dead	1914	
Daniel Keyes	Flowers for Algernon	1959	
Stephen King	Rita Hayworth and Shawshank Redemption	1982	
Andrew Krivak	The Sojourn	2011	
Nella Larsen	Passing	1929	
Nella Larsen	Quicksand	1928	
Doris Lessing	The Fifth Child	1988	
Janet Lewis	The Wife of Martin Guerre	1941	
Johannes Linnankoski	The Fugitives	1908	
Penelope Lively	The Photograph	2003	
H.P. Lovecraft	The Shadow Over Innsmouth	1931	
H.P. Lovecraft	At the Mountains of Madness	1931	
David Malouf	Fly Away Peter	1982	
Thomas Mann	Death in Venice	1912	
Steve Martin	Shopgirl	2000	
Valerie Martin	Property	2003	
Carson McCullers	The Member of the Wedding	1946	
Herman Melville	Bartleby, the Scrivener	1853	
Iris Murdoch	Something Special	1957	
Joyce Carol Oates	Black Water	1992	
Yōko Ogawa	The Housekeeper and the Professor	2003	
Stewart O'Nan	Last Night at the Lobster	2007	
Charles Portis	True Grit	1968	
Annie Proulx	Brokeback Mountain	1997	
Thomas Pynchon	The Crying of Lot 49	1966	
Jean Rhys	Wide Sargasso Sea	1966	
Francoise Sagan	Bonjour, Tristesse	1954	
Aleksandr Solzhenitsyn	One Day in the Life of Ivan Denisovich	1962	
Muriel Spark	The Prime of Miss Jean Brodie	1961	
John Steinbeck	The Pearl	1947	
Leo Tolstoy	The Death of Ivan Ilyich	1886	
Justin Torres	We the Animals	2011	
Voltaire	Candide	1759	
Velma Wallis	Two Old Women	1993	
H. G. Wells	The Time Machine	1895	
Edith Wharton	Bunner Sisters	1916	
Edith Wharton	Madame de Treymes	1907	
Banana Yoshimoto	Kitchen	1988	
