= Bird Girl and the Man Who Followed the Sun =

1996 novel by Velma Wallis

- First edition
- Author: Velma Wallis
- Language: English
- Genre: novel
- Publisher: Epicenter Press, Kenmore, WA
- Publication date: 1996
- Publication place: United States
- ISBN: 0-945397-34-8
- Preceded by: Two Old Women (1993)
- Followed by: Raising Ourselves: A Gwich'in Coming of Age Story from the Yukon River (2002)

Bird Girl and the Man Who Followed the Sun is a 1996 novel by Velma Wallis. It describes the lives of two Gwich'in Athabaskans, Daagoo and Bird Girl, who each defy the rules of their culture and strike out on their own.

== Plot summary ==
Jutthunvaa' is called Bird Girl. She and Daagoo (Snow grouse) are members of two different clans of the people of the Gwich'in, belonging to the Athabaskan tribes. The two young people want to be free. So both sets out, each for itself, through the country. Their parents disapprove of such useless, inappropriate trips. Once Bird Girl and Daagoo meet in the back country. From this point their paths diverge.

With reluctance, Daagoo goes with the hunters of his clan on a caribou hunt. After the hunt, the wandering Daagoo finds all hunters to whom also his father counts murdered. The murderers are, to Daagoo's view, invaders from the north - Inupiat, called by the Gwich'in Ch'eekwais (Inuit). Daagoo reflects and hurries to the rest of his clan, who are still alive. He leads the women, old men and children out of danger. Daagoo practices hunting with the boys in the new camp. When the clan's survival is finally secured, Daagoo has realized his dream. He leaves the icy regions of his home and moves southward to the Land of the Sun.

Meanwhile, the parents of Bird Girl want to marry her off. Defiantly, she escapes because she wants to prevent the dreaded pregnancy. Bird Girl would like to fight through on her own initiative. Bird Girl finds a faraway cave and puts away winter provisions—only there is no caribou meat. Bird Girl goes on a caribou hunt. Bird Girl is overpowered by a Ch'eekwai man, whose father was killed by Gwich'in, and is kidnapped northwards. As a slave, Bird Girl must bend to the will of her torturer and becomes pregnant. The newborn child, a boy, is taken away from her and is raised by a young Ch'eekwai woman. The three brothers of Bird Girl never give up the search for their sister in the following polar summers. During one of their expeditions in the north they are murdered by Ch'eekwais. When the murderers play football with the heads of the beaten brothers for all the world to see, it is the last straw. Bird Girl takes revenge. At night she plugs the smoke holes of the Ch'eekwai dwellings, and all the sleeping Ch'eekwai suffocate, even her own son. This had turned away from the mother. Bird Girl moves home.

Meanwhile, Daagoo has found a woman in the southern Land of the Sun and they have children together. However, Daagoo must experience the murder of all his children. In the end, Daagoo leaves the Land of the Sun and returns to his clan. When Daagoo's and Bird Girl's clan want to get together, both central figures of the novel also find each other again.

"...the author interweaves two classic Athabaskan legends set in ancient central Alaska. This is the story of two rebels who break the strict taboos of their communal culture in their quests for freedom and adventure."

== Bibliography ==
- Bird Girl and the Man Who Followed the Sun: An Athabaskan Indian Legend from Alaska. Alaska Book Adventures. 1996. ISBN 978-0-945397-34-2.
- Velma Wallis: Das Vogelmädchen und der Mann, der der Sonne folgte. Roman. Aus dem Amerikanischen von Angelika Naujokat. 221 pp. München, Zürich 1997, ISBN 3-453-35005-7

== Note ==
This article is based on the corresponding article in the German Wikipedia from 2007-11-8.
