= New Mexico State University Albuquerque Center =

College Campus

Coordinates: 35°8′6.8″N 106°31′12.6″W

New Mexico State University Albuquerque Center is a satellite learning center of New Mexico State University located in Albuquerque, New Mexico. The satellite location provides outreach programs and academic services to prospect, current, and alumni students of NMSU within the Albuquerque area and Northern New Mexico. It offers the Master of Social Work, Master of Public Health, and NMSU's distance education programs at the main campus in Las Cruces. The learning center also provides computer labs, meeting and conference spaces, proctored exams, and academic and community assistance for NMSU students. The current site of NMSU's Albuquerque Center is shared with Central New Mexico Community College's Montoya Campus, which has a transfer agreement for CNM's associate degree graduates to complete their bachelor's degree at NMSU Las Cruces.
