= Western States Book Award =

Western States Book Award honored notable works of fiction, creative nonfiction, poetry, and translation written and published in the Western United States. The award was given annually from 1984 until 2002. Lifetime-achievement awards were also presented.

== Winners ==
=== Fiction ===
- 1984: The iguana killer: twelve stories of the heart by Alberto Rios
- 1986: My amputations: a novel by Clarence Major
- 1988: Sailing to Corinth: stories by Irene Wanner
- 1990: The devil in Texas (El Diablo en Texas) by Aristeo Brito
- 1992: Little altars everywhere: a novel by Rebecca Wells
- 1993: The hedge, the ribbon: a novel by Carol Orlock
- 1994: MotherTongue by Demetria Martinez
- 1996: A killing in New Town by Kate Horsley
- 1998: The flower in the skull by Kathleen Alcalá
- 1999: The blossom festival by Lawrence Coates
- 1999: Men on the moon: collected short stories by Simon Ortiz
- 2000: Straight white male by Gerald Haslam
- 2001: The road builder by Nicholas Hershenow

=== Poetry ===
- 1984: In all the rooms of the yellow house by Nancy Mairs
- 1984: New as a wave: a retrospective, 1937-1983 by Eve Triem
- 1986: Time and the white tigress by Mary Barnard
- 1988: Desire: selected poems, 1963-1987 by David Bromige
- 1990: New poems, 1980-88 by John Haines
- 1992: My name is William Tell: poems by William Stafford
- 1993: August zero by Jane Miller
- 1994: The fever of being by Luis Alberto Urrea
- 1995: My town by David Lee
- 1996: Flying over Sonny Liston: poems by Gary Short
- 1998: Four-year-old-girl by Mei-Mei Berssenbrugge
- 1999: Communion by Primus St. John
- 2000: The brink by Peter Sears
- 2001: Bitters by Rebecca Seiferle
- 2001: Cool, calm, & collected: poems 1960-2000 by Carolyn Kizer

=== Creative nonfiction ===
- 1984: A heaven in the eye by Clyde Rice
- 1986: The seventh dragon: the riddle of equal temperament by Anita Sullivan
  (citation for merit) Having everything right: essays of place by Kim R. Stafford
- 1988: Mayordomo: chronicle of an acequia in northern New Mexico by Stanley Crawford
- 1990: The telling distance: conversations with the American desert by Bruce Berger
- 1992: Going back to Bisbee by Richard Shelton
  (citation for merit) Fruit fields in my blood: Okie migrants in the West by Toby F. Sonneman
- 1993: Two old women: an Alaska legend of betrayal, courage, and survival by Velma Wallis
- 1994: Iron house: stories from the yard by Jerome Washington
- 1995: Borneo log: the struggle for Sarawak's forests by William Bevis
- 1995: Downcanyon: a naturalist explores the Colorado River through the Grand Canyon by Ann Haymond Zwinger
- 1996: Wisdom sits in places: language and landscape among the Western Apache by Keith Basso
- 1998: Chokecherry places: essays from the high plains by Merrill Gilfillan
- 1999: Salt dreams: land & water in low-down California by William Debuys
- 2000: In these hills by Ralph Beer
- 2001: My story as told by water: confessions, Druidic rants, reflections, bird-watchings, fish-stalkings, visions, songs and prayers refracting light, from living rivers, in the age of the industrial dark by David James Duncan

=== Translation ===
- 2000: The collected songs of Cold Mountain by Hanshan; translated from the Chinese by Red Pine
- 2001: The silk dragon: translations from the Chinese translated by Arthur Sze

=== Lifetime Achievement ===
- 1984: Eve Triem in poetry
- 1990: John Hainesin poetry
- 1992: William Stafford in poetry
- 1999: Simon Ortiz in fiction
- 2001: Carolyn Kizer in poetry

== See also ==
- Western States Arts Federation
