= Bataan Military Academy =

High school in New Mexico (2007–2016)

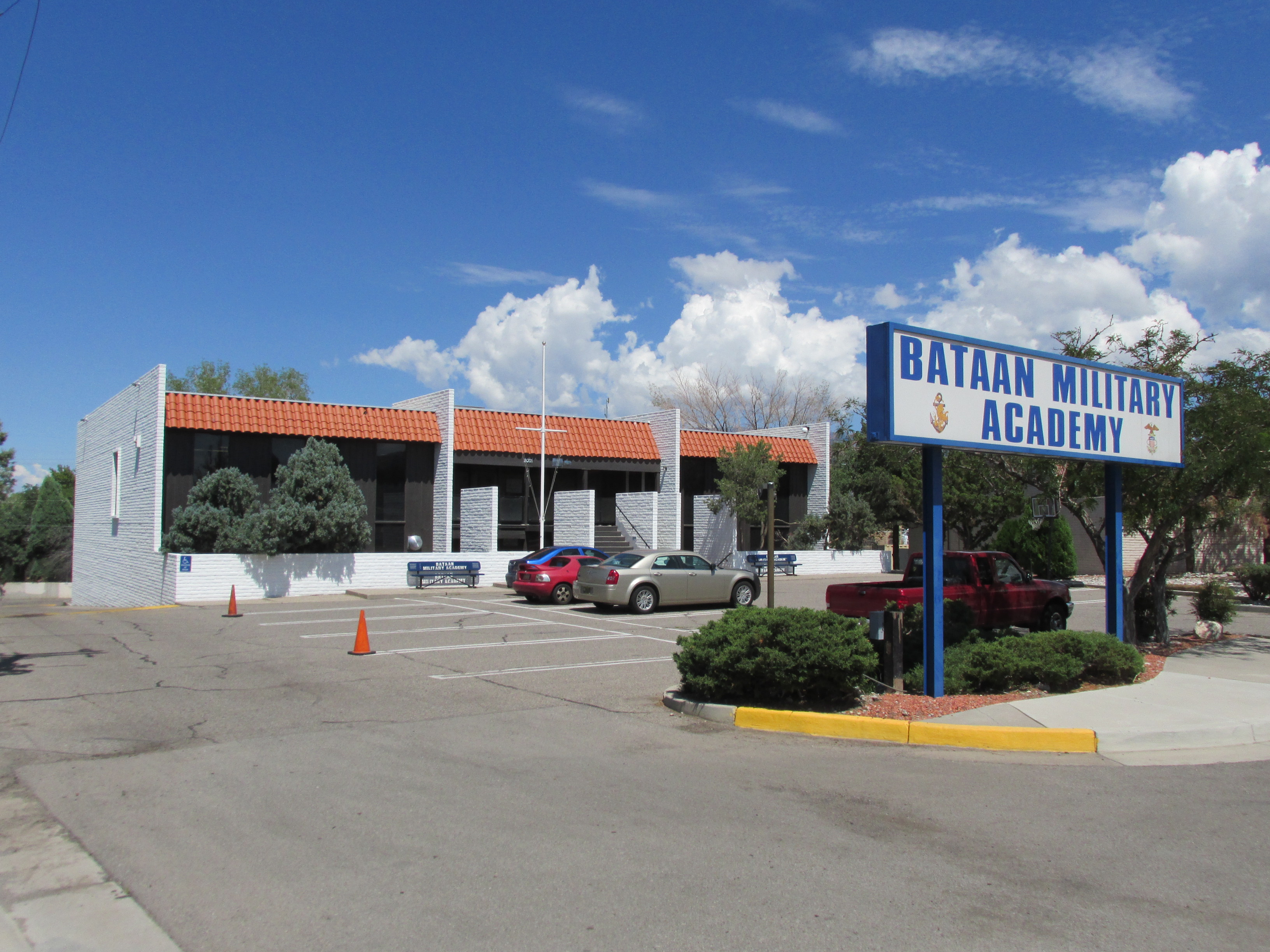
- Bataan Military Academy

Location
- McLeod Road NE; Albuquerque, New Mexico 87109; United States
- 35.092489°N 106.557448°W

Information
- School type: Public Charter School
- Motto: Honor, Courage, Commitment
- Established: 2006
- Founder: Mark L. Hendricks, William Barker
- Principal: Jan Zink
- Staff: 20 teachers
- Grades: 9-12
- Gender: Co-ed
- Enrollment: c. 140 cadets
- Average class size: 23-25
- Colors: Navy blue and gold
- Athletics: basketball, volleyball
- Mascot: Mythological Sea Lion
- Newspaper: Captain's Log
- Website: bataanmilitaryacademy.org

Bataan Military Academy was a tuition-free, co-ed, college-prep public day high school. All cadets were members of the Navy Junior Reserve Officers Corps, the U.S. Navy's youth organization. Bataan opened at the beginning of the 2007–2008 school year with freshmen and sophomores. The school closed at the end of the 2015–2016 school year due to declining enrolment.

The academy was named to commemorate the soldiers and sailors who surrendered to Japanese forces on Luzon in 1942. During a forced removal to a POW camp, some 70,000 of these American and Philippine soldiers died during what later became known as the Bataan Death March. In remembrance of these brave men (many of whom were from New Mexico's 200th Coastal Artillery) BMA Cadets participate in the annual 26 mile Bataan Death March Memorial Marathon held at the U.S. Army White Sands Missile Range near Las Cruces, New Mexico.

== Campus ==
The campus was located in Albuquerque, NM.

== Students ==
Students were selected via an interview with the principal and NSI. Courses included standard high-school curriculum.

Through the IDEAL New Mexico program, an online high school curriculum, Cadets were able to take additional courses, such as advanced mathematics and AP classes.

During the 2009–2010 school year, all incoming New Mexico high school freshmen were required to attend at least one advanced placement or dual-credit course during their high-school years. BMA worked with Central New Mexico Community College and the University of New Mexico to satisfy that goal.

=== Naval Science ===
U.S. Naval Science was a unique course offered by BMA. The course included military history, traditions, uniform regulations, basic military regulations, military-related career exploration, how to identify and report sexual harassment, the military's no drug/alcohol policies, and an emphasis on building leadership skills. The cadet rank system was based on an individual’s time in service and completion of course work available through U.S. Naval Science classes.

=== Physical Training ===
Bataan Cadets were required to engage in physical training every Wednesday according to the U. S. Navy's physical training standards.

=== Ethics ===
The U.S. Navy's standards of ‘Honor, Courage and Commitment’ were taught and implemented in Academy relationships. Ethics and morals were instilled every day through military drills and a military environment.

BMA followed an Honor Code which stated, “Cadets do not lie, cheat or steal, and will not tolerate those who do.”

== Extra-Curricular Activities ==
The school offered a variety of extra-curricular activities, including athletic and academic pursuits.

=== Mascot: Heraldic Sea Lion ===
As World War II began, a U.S. submarine happened to be docked on the Philippine Island of Luzon. On the third day after the events at Pearl Harbor, Japanese air forces bombed the submarine. Several U.S. sailors died as most were on shore. Later, Japanese ground forces invaded the island and eventually captured American and Filipino troops leading to the events of the Death March. After the war and the return to the U.S., survivors of the Bataan Death March formed an organization named the Battling Bastards of Bataan. They selected the heraldry symbol of a sea lion to represent the organization. Dating to the year 400 AD, the sea lion represented the men who fought to protect the coastal waters. Bataan Military Academy proudly presented the sea lion as its mascot. Former Navy artist Jim Pearson of Albuquerque was commissioned to create a contemporary version of the sea lion. It is his conceptual version that was used by the academy.

== Military Life ==
As cadets did not live at the academy, discipline was reinforced by adult instructors and senior cadets due to a belief that guidance was crucial to cadet growth.

=== Military Organization ===
Cadets were organized into platoons consisting of their naval science classes. Platoon structure was as follows: Platoon Commander, Platoon Leading Petty Officer, Platoon Yeoman, Squad Leaders (1-4).

Battalion Command was as follows: Commanding Officer, Executive Officer, Administrative Officer, Operations Officer, Supply Officer, Safety Officer, Morale/Welfare/Recreation Officer, Training Officer, Public Affairs Officer, Command Chief.

== NJROTC ==
The School used the Uniforms and the rank structure of the NJROTC program. The rank structure was as follows: E-1 Seaman Recruit E-2 Seaman Apprentice E-3 Seaman E-4 Petty Officer Third Class E-5 Petty Officer Second Class E-6 Petty Officer First Class E-7 Chief Petty Officer E-8 Senior Chief Petty Officer E-9 Master Chief Petty Officer O-1 Ensign O-2 Lieutenant Junior Grade O-3 Lieutenant O-4 Lieutenant Commander O-5 Commander

== Related Pages ==
- United States Naval Academy
- Bataan Death March
