= Mike Burns (American football) =

American football player (born 1954)

No. 28, 29
- Position: Defensive back

Personal information
- Born: April 6, 1954 (age 72); Oakland, California, U.S.
- Listed height: 6 ft 0 in (1.83 m)
- Listed weight: 181 lb (82 kg)

Career information
- High school: El Cerrito) (El Cerrito, California)
- College: Contra Costa (1973–1974); USC (1975–1976)
- NFL draft: 1977: 6th round, 141st overall pick

Career history
- San Francisco 49ers (1977); Detroit Lions (1978); BC Lions (1981)*
- * Offseason or practice squad member only

Awards and highlights
- National champion (1974)
- Stats at Pro Football Reference

Michael Wayne Burns (born April 6, 1954) is an American former professional football defensive back who played two seasons in the National Football League (NFL) with the San Francisco 49ers and Detroit Lions. He was selected by the 49ers in the sixth round of the 1977 NFL draft. He played college football at Contra Costa College and the University of Southern California.

== Early life and college ==
Michael Wayne Burns was born on April 6, 1954, in Oakland, California. He attended El Cerrito High School in El Cerrito, California.

Burns first played college football at Contra Costa College from 1973 to 1974. He was then a two-year letterman for the USC Trojans of the University of Southern California from 1975 to 1976. He made one interception his senior year in 1976. The 1974 Trojans were Coaches Poll national champions.

== Professional career ==
Burns was selected by the San Francisco 49ers in the sixth round, with the 141st overall pick, of the 1977 NFL draft. He played in all 14 games for the 49ers during his rookie year in 1977. He was waived on August 22, 1978.

Burns was claimed off waivers by the Detroit Lions on August 25, 1978. He was waived on August 29 but re-signed on September 6, 1978. He appeared in 15 games, starting 11, during the 1978 season, recording one interception and one fumble recovery. Burns was released on August 21, 1979.

Burns signed with the BC Lions of the Canadian Football League in 1981 but was later released.
