= Mike Ariey =

American football player (born 1964)

No. 76
- Position: Offensive tackle

Personal information
- Born: March 12, 1964 (age 62); Bakersfield, California, U.S.
- Listed height: 6 ft 5 in (1.96 m)
- Listed weight: 295 lb (134 kg)

Career information
- High school: Garces Memorial (California)
- College: San Diego State
- NFL draft: 1987: undrafted

Career history
- New York Giants (1987)*; (1988); Green Bay Packers (1989)
- * Offseason or practice squad member only

Career NFL statistics
- Games played: 1
- Stats at Pro Football Reference

Michael August Ariey (March 12, 1964) is an American former offensive tackle in the National Football League. Ariey attended Garces Memorial High School in his hometown of Bakersfield, California, before playing at the collegiate level at San Diego State University. In the NFL, he played with Green Bay Packers, appearing in 1 game during the 1989 NFL season. That year he suffered a knee injury in May 1989, during the team's offseason minicamp. He was suspended at the beginning of the season for steroid use.
