= Joe Hernandez (American football) =

American football player (1940–2021)

No. 35, 22, 80, 11, 16
- Position: Wide receiver

Personal information
- Born: February 9, 1940; Bakersfield, California, U.S.
- Died: December 7, 2021 (aged 81); Bakersfield, California, U.S.
- Listed height: 6 ft 2 in (1.88 m)
- Listed weight: 180 lb (82 kg)

Career information
- High school: Garces Memorial (Bakersfield)
- College: New Mexico Military Institute (1958); Bakersfield CC (1959); Arizona (1960–1961)
- NFL draft: 1962: 2nd round, 15th overall pick
- AFL draft: 1962: 5th round, 33rd overall pick

Career history
- Toronto Argonauts (1962); Edmonton Eskimos (1963); Washington Redskins (1964); Atlanta Falcons (1966)*; Edmonton Eskimos (1966–1970)
- * Offseason or practice squad member only

Awards and highlights
- 2× CFL Western All-Star (1967, 1970)

Career NFL statistics
- Receptions: 1
- Receiving yards: 18
- Return yards: 68
- Stats at Pro Football Reference

Joe Hernandez (February 9, 1940 – December 7, 2021) was an American football wide receiver who played in the National Football League (NFL) for the Washington Redskins and the Canadian Football League (CFL) for the Edmonton Eskimos.

== Playing career ==
Hernandez graduated from Garces Memorial High School in Bakersfield, California before playing college football for the University of Arizona. was drafted in the second round of the 1962 NFL draft. He was also selected in the fifth round of the 1962 AFL draft by the Oakland Raiders.

Upon his return to the Edmonton Eskimos, he switched to playing defensive back and was a two time all-star (1967 and 1970.)

== Personal life and death ==
Hernandez was of Mexican descent. He died from COVID-19 on December 7, 2021, at the age of 81.
