= Straight White Male =

2000 novel by Gerald Haslam

- Author: Gerald Haslam
- Language: English
- Genre: Fiction
- Published: 2000
- Publication place: United States

Straight White Male, a novel by California writer Gerald Haslam, won the Western States Arts Federation Book Award for Fiction and the Foreword Magazine Book of the Year Award in 2000.

== Plot ==
The story of a middle-aged couple caring for the husband's aging, ailing parents and their own children, while troubled by a past with which they have never come to terms.
