= Gerald Haslam =

American writer (1937–2021)

- Born: March 18, 1937; Bakersfield, California, U.S.
- Died: April 13, 2021 (aged 84); Petaluma, California, U.S.
- Education: Garces Memorial High School
- Alma mater: Bakersfield College; San Francisco State University; The Union Graduate School
- Occupation: Author
- Spouse: Janice E. Pettichord
- Children: 5

Gerald William Haslam (March 18, 1937 – April 13, 2021) was an author focused on rural and small towns in California's Great Central Valley including its poor and working-class people of all colors. A native of Oildale, California, Haslam has received numerous literary awards.

== Early life and education ==
Haslam was born in Bakersfield, California in 1937. The son of an oil worker, he grew up in nearby Oildale where Merle Haggard was a neighbor. He attended Garces Memorial High School before working as a farm field hand, a store clerk and an oil field roustabout and roughneck. He served in the U.S. Army from 1958 through 1960. He attended Bakersfield College 1955–57, 1960–61, then married Janice Eileen Pettichord in 1961. He later attended San Francisco State University, where he earned a B.A. in 1963 and an M.A. in 1965. Haslam also attended, and gave great credit to, Washington State University, 1965 and 1966. He completed a Ph.D. from The Union Graduate School (Cincinnati, OH), in 1980. He played college football, ran track and boxed in the Golden Gloves.

== Career ==
Haslam was a professor of English at Sonoma State University (SSU) from 1967 to 1997. After becoming a professor emeritus, he occasionally taught for the Oscher Lifelong Learning program (Sonoma State University). He taught part time at the Fromm Institute for Lifelong Learning at the University of San Francisco from 2001 to 2015.

Concurrent with his teaching at SSU, Haslam published numerous articles and stories in national and regional magazines. He was a columnist for the San Francisco Chronicle's Sunday magazine and was a Contributing Writer for the Los Angeles Times Sunday magazine, and continued to be an op-ed contributor to the Sacramento Bee. Haslam also served as a commentator for KQED-FM's "The California Report." His writing is widely anthologized.

== Personal life ==
Haslam's wife, Janice Eileen Haslam, has edited all his books and co-authored three of them. They resided in Penngrove, California. They are the parents of Fred Haslam, lead developer of Sim City 2000; of "Anomalies" website developer Garth Haslam; and of magazine editor Alexandra Russell, who has been her father's partner on two books. His other two children—research biologist Simone Haslam Sawyer and Carlos Haslam, a vivarium manager -— are not involved in writing or publishing. He was also survived by 14 grandchildren.

According to Russell, Haslam died of prostate cancer at Petaluma Valley Hospital in Petaluma on April 13, 2021, aged 84, which was confirmed by an article in The Press Democrat. Haslam wrote his own obituary, which was discovered shortly after his death.

== Literary awards ==
- 2016 Eric Hoffer Legacy Fiction Award (from US Review of Books) for Grace Period
- 2016 Eric Hoffer Culture Award, Honorable Mention, (from US Review of Books) for Leon Patterson: A California Story
- 2013 Award of Merit (from the American Association for State and Local History) for In Thought and Action
- 2013 S. I. Hayakawa Book Prize (from the Institute of General Semantics) for In Thought and Action
- 2006 Josephine Miles Award (from PEN Oakland) for Haslam's Valley
- 2005 Delbert and Edith Wylder Award (from the Western Literature Association)
- 2004 Certificate of Commendation (from the California Arts Council)
- 2001 Western States Book Award (fiction) for Straight White Male
- 2001 Silver Medal (from FOREWORD magazine) for Straight White Male
- 2001 Carey McWilliams Award (from the California Studies Association)
- 2001 Certificate of Commendation (from the American Association for State and Local History) for Workin' Man Blues
- 2000 Ralph J. Gleason Award (from Rolling Stone, BMI and NYU) for Workin' Man Blues
- 1999 Distinguished Achievement Award (from the Western Literature Association)
- 1994 Commonwealth Club Silver Medal for The Great Central Valley: California's Heartland
- 1994 Award of Merit (from the American Association for State and Local History) for The Great Central Valley: California's Heartland
- 1994 Bay Area Book Reviewers' Award for The Great Central Valley: California's Heartland
- 1993 Benjamin Franklin Award (from Publishers' Marketing Association) for Many Californias: Literature from the Golden State
- 1990 Josephine Miles Award (from PEN Oakland) for That Constant Coyote
- 1989 Creative Writing Fellowship (from the California Arts Council)
- 1988 Honorable Mention, SPUR Short Fiction Award (from Western Writers of America) for "The Estero"
- 1985 Bernard Ashton Raborg Award (from AMELIA magazine) for "William Saroyan and the Critics"
- 1983 Special Mention, Pushcart Prize (for "The Man Who Cultivated Fire")
- 1971 Honorable Mention, Joseph Henry Jackson Award (for "Okies")
- 1969 Arizona Quarterly Award (for "The Subtle Thread")

== Works ==
=== Fiction ===
- Okies: Selected Stories (1st edition, 1973, New West Publications, 2nd ed, 1974; 3rd ed, Peregrine-Smith, 1975)
- Masks: A Novel (Old Adobe Press, 1976)
- The Wages of Sin: Collected Stories (Duck Down Press/ Windriver Books, 1980)
- Hawk Flights: Visions of the West (Seven Buffaloes Press, 1983)
- Snapshots: Glimpses of the Other California (Devil Mountain Books, 1985)
- The Man Who Cultivated Fire (Capra Press, 1987)
- That Constant Coyote: California Stories (Univ. of Nevada Press, 1990)
- Condor Dreams & Other Fictions (Univ.of Nevada Press, 1994)
- The Great Tejon Club Jubilee (Devil Mountain Books, 1996)
- Manuel and the Madman (Thwack! Pow! Productions, 2000)
- Straight White Male (Univ. of Nevada Press, 2000)
- Haslam's Valley (Heyday Books, 2005)
- Grace Period (Univ. of Nevada Press, 2006)

=== Non-Fiction ===
- The Language of the Oil Fields (Old Adobe Press, 1972)
- Voices of a Place: Social and Literary Essays from the Other California (Devil Mountain Books, 1987)
- Coming of Age in California (Devil Mountain Books 1990; second, expanded edition, 2000)
- The Other California (Capra Press, 1990; second, expanded edition, Univ. of Nevada Press, 1994)
- The Great Central Valley: California's Heartland (with photographers Stephen Johnson & Robert Dawson; Univ. of California Press, 1993)
- Workin' Man Blues: Country Music in California (With Alexandra Haslam Russell & Richard Chon, Univ. of California Press, 1999)
- In Thought and Action: The Enigmatic Life of S. I. Hayakawa (with Janice E. Haslam; Univ. of Nebraska Press, 2011)
- Leon Patterson: A California Story (with Janice E. Haslam, Devil Mountain Books, 2014)

=== Anthologies edited ===
- (ed.) Forgotten Pages of American Literature (Houghton-Mifflin, 1970)
- (ed.) Western Writing (University of New Mexico Press, 1974)
- (ed. with James D. Houston) California Heartland: Writing from the Great Central Valley (Capra Press, 1978)
- (ed. with J. Golden Taylor, et al.) Literary History of the American West (Texas Christian University Press, 1987)
- (ed.) Many Californias: Literature from the Golden State (University of Nevada Press, 1992; second edition, 1999)
- (ed. with Alexandra R. Haslam) Where Coyotes Howl and Wind Blows Free: Growing Up in the West (Univ of Nevada Press, 1995)
- (ed.) Jack London's Golden State: Selected California Writings (Heyday Books, 1999)

=== Booklets and Monographs ===
- William Eastlake (Steck-Vaughn Southwest Writers' Series, 1970)
- (ed.) Afro-American Oral Literature (Harper & Row, 1974)
- Jack Schaefer (Boise State University Western Writers' Series, 1976)
- Voices of a Place: The Great Central Valley (California Academy of Sciences, 1986)
- Lawrence Clark Powell (Boise State University Western Writers' Series, 1992)
- (with Stephen Glasser) Out of the Slush Pile (Poets & Writers Inc., 1993)
- The Horned Toad (Thwack! Pow! Productions, 1995)
- An Instructor's Guide to Where Coyotes Howl and Wind Blows Free (Univ. of Nevada Press, 1996)
- Gerald Haslam in Conversation with Jonah Raskin (Sonoma County Literary Arts Guild, 2006)

== Sources ==
- Breiger, Marek., "Haslam's Oildale, Our California," California English, 28:4 (September/October, 1992)
- Dunn, Geoffrey, "Central Valley Boys," San Francisco Review of Books, 16:1 (Summer, 1991)
- Houston, James D., "Gerald Haslam's The Other California," California History, LXXII:3 (Fall 1993)
- Locklin, Gerald, "The Emergence of Gerald Haslam," Small Press Review April, 1989
- Locklin, Gerald. "Gerald Haslam," Dictionary of Literary Biography, Number 99 (1989)
- Locklin, Gerald. "Gerald Haslam," Updating the Literary West, Texas Christian University Press, 1997
- Locklin, Gerald. Gerald Haslam, Western Writers Series, Boise, ID., No.77 (1989)
- Locklin, Gerald & Charles Stetler, "Interview with Gerald Haslam," Home Planet News, 4:3 (Fall 1983)
- Maloney, Mary Grace, Central Valley Mythology: The Works of Gerald Haslam, Honors Humanities Thesis, Stanford University, 1985
- Peck, David, "Gerald Haslam, the Heartland's Voice," The Californians, Jan-Feb 1988
- Penna, Christina, "Heartland," California English 23:2 (March–April 1987)
- Ronald, Ann, "Gerald Haslam and Ann Ronald: A Conversation," Western American Literature, XXX:3 (August 1987)
- Siegel, Mark, "Contemporary Trends in Western American Fiction," A Literary History of the American West (Fort Worth: Texas Christian University Press, 1978
- Speer, Laurel, "Harry and Gerry." Small Press Review, June, 1988
- Starr, Kevin, "Six Californias and the Central Valley," State Librarian's Weekly Column (online), May 19, 1995
- Weeks, Jonina, A Contemporary Western Writer, Gerald Haslam: His Means to a New West and the World, Sonoma State University Master's Thesis, 1988
- Wylder, Delbert, "Recent Western Fiction," Journal of the West, January 1988
