= El Cerrito High School =

Public high school in El Cerrito, California

Location
- 540 Ashbury Avenue; El Cerrito, California; United States; 37°54′31″N 122°17′43″W

Information
- Type: Public high school
- Established: 1941
- School district: West Contra Costa Unified School District
- Principal: Stacy Wayne
- Teaching staff: 60.81 FTEs
- Grades: 9th–12th
- Enrollment: 1,460 (2024–2025)
- Student to teacher ratio: 24.01
- Colors: Green and white
- Mascot: Gauchos (Gauchos in Spanish)
- Website: ecgauchos.wccusd.net

El Cerrito High School is a four-year public high school in the West Contra Costa Unified School District. It is located on Ashbury Avenue in El Cerrito, California, United States and serves students from El Cerrito, a portion of eastern Richmond (east of Interstate 80 and south of San Pablo Dam Road) and the unincorporated communities of East Richmond Heights and Kensington.

As of the 2023–24 school year, the school had an enrollment of 1,476 students and 66.0 classroom teachers (on an FTE basis), for a student–teacher ratio of 22.36:1. There were 480 students (32.5% of enrollment) eligible for free lunch and 104 (7% of students) eligible for reduced-cost lunch.

== Overview ==
The original main school building was built in the late 1930s as a WPA project. The school opened to students on January 6, 1941.

Student population quickly outgrew the facilities, and the campus became a collection of small, outlying buildings. As concerns grew over the building's safety and structural stability, plans were made for more integrated buildings. In the summer of 2005, demolition of the old campus began. By 2007, the campus had been demolished, and the terrain was leveled in preparation for reconstruction. During the reconstruction, all classes were held in temporary buildings located south of the campus on the former baseball field. The new campus opened on January 5, 2009.

El Cerrito's student body is 35.6% African-American, 23.7% Hispanic, 17.2% Asian, 16.7% Caucasian, and 2.5% Filipino. Many of these students are actually mixed race, making El Cerrito a very diverse high school. Half of students come from families with a low enough income to qualify for free or reduced price lunches under the National School Lunch Act. Many students come from the neighboring city of Richmond, which is also served by the West Contra Costa Unified School District.

=== Art programs ===
==== Bands ====
The Gaucho Band may have become the first high-school band to be nationally televised when they stood in for Ohio State University Marching Band at their game against Berkeley at Memorial Stadium on October 3, 1953. The Gauchos then adapted and adopted Ohio's fight song, "Across the Field," as "Down the Field."

== Notable alumni ==
=== Athletics ===
- Dwain Anderson, MLB infielder, Oakland Athletics 1971–1972, St. Louis Cardinals 1972–1973, San Diego Padres 1973, Cleveland Indians 1974
- Aaron Banks, NFL offensive guard, San Francisco 49ers 2021–present
- Jerry Bell, NFL tight end, Tampa Bay Buccaneers 1982–1987
- Ernie Broglio, MLB pitcher, St. Louis Cardinals 1959–1964, Chicago Cubs 1964–1966
- Mike Burns, NFL player
- Les Cain, MLB pitcher, Detroit Tigers 1968, 1970–1972
- John Flavin, MLB pitcher, Chicago Cubs 1964
- Drew Gooden, NBA power forward/center, Washington Wizards 2002–2016
- Cornell Green, NFL defensive back, Dallas Cowboys 1962–1974
- Pumpsie Green, MLB infielder, Boston Red Sox 1959–1962, New York Mets 1963
- Mario Hollands, MLB pitcher, Philadelphia Phillies 2014–2017
- Roddy Lee, Olympic athlete
- Kamil Loud, NFL wide receiver/kick returner, Buffalo Bills 1998–1999
- Mike McGrath, PBA bowler, 1965–1975
- Jamir Miller, NFL linebacker, Arizona Cardinals 1994–1998, Cleveland Browns 1999–2002
- Bob Newman, football player
- Adarius Pickett, football player
- Chris Roberson, MLB outfielder, Philadelphia Phillies 2006–2007
- Terrell Roberts, NFL player
- Harvey Salem, NFL offensive tackle 1983–1992
- Todd Spencer, NFL running back, Pittsburgh Steelers 1984–1985, San Diego Chargers 1987
- John Thomas, NFL player 1958–1967
- Lamont Thompson, NFL defensive safety 2002–2007

=== Entertainment ===
- Paul Baloff, former vocalist of Exodus
- Monica Bill Barnes, dancer and choreographer
- Stephen Bradley, touring member of the band No Doubt; music producer
- Doug Clifford, member of the band Creedence Clearwater Revival
- Lawrence Coates, novelist
- Stu Cook, member of the band Creedence Clearwater Revival
- John Fogerty, member of the band Creedence Clearwater Revival
- Cynthia Gouw, TV news host, model and actress; class of 1981
- Michael Jeffries, singer, Tower of Power
- Phil Lesh, musician, of the Grateful Dead
- Larry Lynch, drummer best known for his work with The Greg Kihn Band
- Maria Remenyi, former Miss USA
- Adam Sessler, host of G4's X-Play
- Justin Tipping, film director
- Gail Tsukiyama, novelist
- Mark Whitaker, former band manager of Exodus; produced albums for Exodus and Metallica
- Steve Wright, bassist best known for his work with The Greg Kihn Band

=== Business ===
- Martin Eberhard, founder of Tesla Motors
- Byron Lars, fashion designer

=== Academia ===
- Amy Chua, law professor at Yale Law School, author of Battle Hymn of the Tiger Mother
- Lawrence Coates, professor at Bowling Green State University
