= Bob McCaffrey =

American football player (born 1952)

No. 58
- Position: Center

Personal information
- Born: April 16, 1952 (age 74); Bakersfield, California, U.S.
- Listed height: 6 ft 2 in (1.88 m)
- Listed weight: 245 lb (111 kg)

Career information
- High school: Garces Memorial (CA)
- College: USC
- NFL draft: 1975: 16th round, 400th overall pick

Career history
- Green Bay Packers (1975)

Awards and highlights
- 2× National champion (1972, 1974); Second-team All-Pac-8 (1973)

Career NFL statistics
- Games played: 11
- Games started: 3
- Stats at Pro Football Reference

Robert Alan McCaffrey (born April 16, 1952) is a former National Football League (NFL) center who had a notable career while a student athlete on the University of Southern California (USC) Trojans football team.

After playing football at Garces Memorial High School in Bakersfield, California, McCaffrey played football at the University of Southern California where he lettered three seasons, 1972–74. The Trojans won national championships and played in the Rose Bowl in 1972 and 1974. He was honored as USC's Lineman of the Year in 1974 and junior varsity MVP in 1971. He played in the 1975 Chicago Charities College All-Star Game where a team of star college seniors played the Super Bowl IX champion Pittsburgh Steelers, losing 21–14. He graduated from USC in 1975.

== Professional career ==
McCaffrey was drafted 400th overall in the 16th round by the Green Bay Packers in the 1975 NFL draft. He played one season before retiring.

== Personal ==
The son of McCaffrey and wife Karen, Brent McCaffrey, played football for USC as a left tackle, lettering for three seasons (1998–2000).

== After football ==
McCaffrey joined his father-in-law, John Bonadelle, and became real estate developer in Fresno, California. He now heads The McCaffrey Group and is on the board of directors of the Building Industry Association of Fresno/Madera Counties, having previously served as chairman of the board.
