= Demetria Martinez =

American poet

- Born: July 10, 1960 (age 66)
- Education: Woodrow Wilson School of Public and International Affairs (BA)
- Occupations: Activist; poet; novelist

Demetria Martinez (born July 10, 1960) is an American activist, poet, and novelist.

== Early life ==
She was born on July 10, 1960, where she was raised by her grandmother in Albuquerque, New Mexico. She is a graduate of Princeton University with BA from the Woodrow Wilson School of Public and International Affairs.

In 1988, Martinez was charged with conspiracy for allegedly transporting two Salvadoran women refugees into the United States; she was working as a freelance reporter covering religion and the Sanctuary Movement at the time. She was later acquitted of the charges. During the trial, prosecutors used Martinez's poem "Nativity, For Two Salvadoran Women" in an attempt to build a case against her, a decision Martinez has called a "major error."

== Career ==
Martinez worked as a religion reporter for the Albuquerque Journal in August 1986.

She has been an editor for the National Catholic Review in Tucson, Arizona, since 1990, and teaches in the annual William Joiner Center for the Study of War and Social Consequences at the University of Massachusetts Boston.

== Activism ==
Martinez has been associated with the Sanctuary Movement and with Enlace Comunitario, an Albuquerque-based organization that serves immigrant families experiencing domestic violence.

== Awards ==
- International Latino Book Award for best biography (2006): Confessions of a Berlitz-Tape Chicana (University of Oklahoma Press, 2005)
- Western States Book Award for fiction: Mother Tongue (Ballintine, 1994)
- Thirteenth Annual Chicano Literary Arts Contest (first prize: poem): "Turning" (Bilingual Press Review, 1989)
- American Book Award (2013)

== Published works ==
- Martinez, Demetria; Sherman, Susan (2025). Poetry in Dangerous Times: Two Women, Two Worlds. Abiquiú, NM: Casa Urraca Press. ISBN 9781956375336.
- Three Times a Woman: Chicana Poetry (includes the poem "Turning"), Bilingual Press/Review (Tempe, AZ), 1989 ISBN 978-0916950910
- MotherTongue, Bilingual Press/Editorial Bilingue (Tempe, AZ), 1994, translated into Spanish by Ana Maria de la Fuente and published as Lengua madre, Seix Barral (Barcelona, Spain), 1996 ISBN 978-0345416568
- Breathing between the Lines: Poems, University of Arizona Press (Tucson, AZ), 1997 ISBN 978-0816517985
- The Devil's Workshop, University of Arizona Press (Tucson, AZ), 2002 ISBN 978-0816521975
- Confessions of a Berlitz-Tape Chicana (Chicana and Chicano Visions of the Americas series) ISBN 978-0806137223
- The Block Captain's Daughter (Chicana and Chicano Visions of the Americas series) ISBN 978-0806142913
