= Garces Memorial High School =

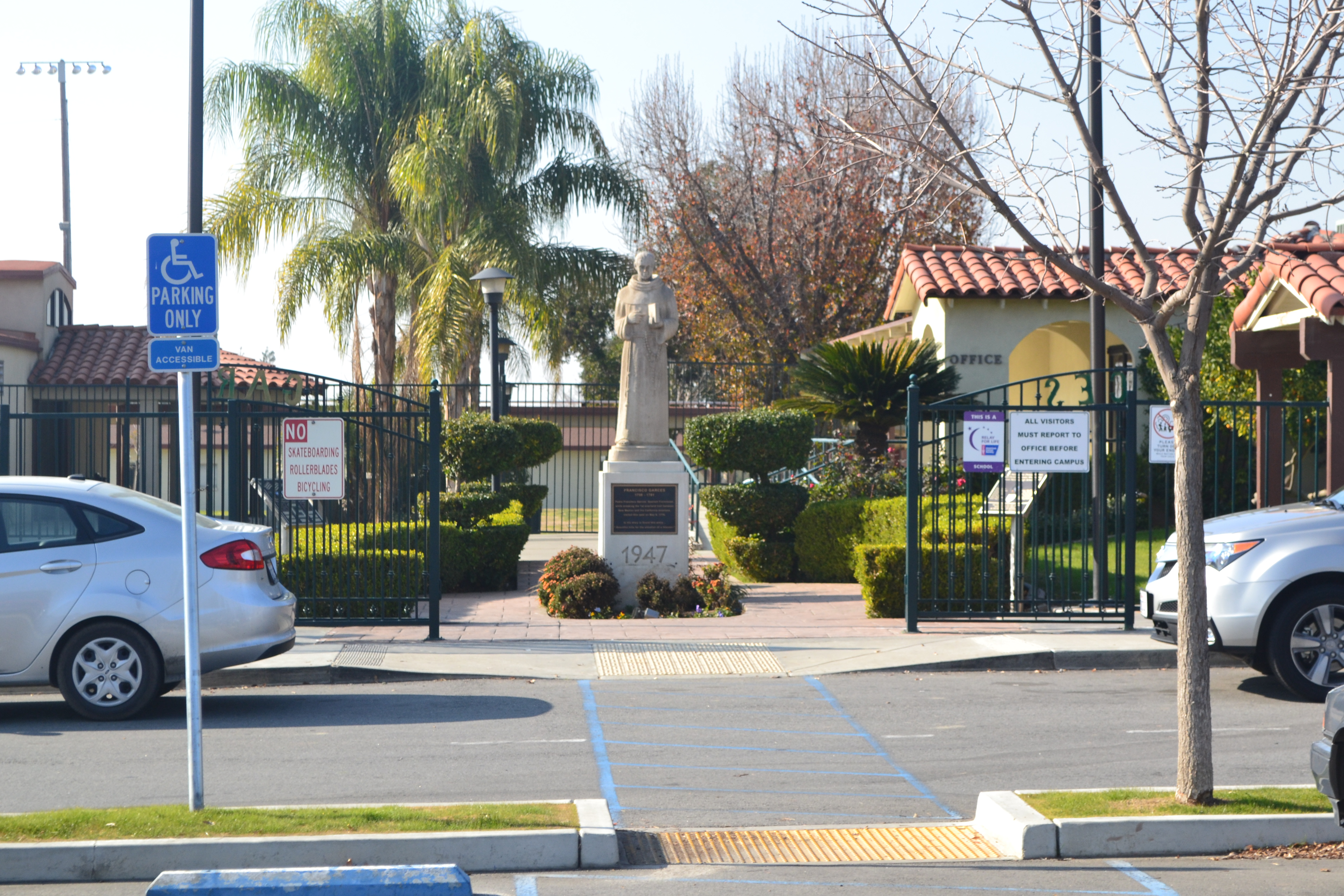

Location
- 2800 Loma Linda Drive; Bakersfield, California 93305; United States; 35°24′0″N 118°59′58″W

Information
- Type: Private, Coeducational
- Religious affiliation: Catholic
- Established: 1947
- Oversight: Diocese of Fresno
- Principal: Noel Leon
- Grades: 9-12
- Average class size: 26
- Campus size: 32 acres (130,000 m^{2})
- Colors: Green, white and gold
- Athletics: Baseball, Basketball, Cross Country, American football, Golf, Soccer, Softball, Swimming, Track & Field, Tennis, Volleyball, Diving, Water Polo, Wrestling
- Athletics conference: CIF Central Section; South Yosemite River League
- Mascot: Rams
- Nickname: Rams
- Rivals: San Joaquin Memorial High School, Bakersfield High School, Bakersfield Christian High School, Tehachapi High School, Stockdale High School
- Accreditation: Western Association of Schools and Colleges
- Yearbook: El Padre
- Tuition: $8,985 for Catholics, $9,285 for non-Catholics
- Website: www.garces.org

Garces Memorial High School, commonly shortened to Garces High School, is a Catholic high school in Bakersfield, California.

The school offers college prep, honors, and Advanced Placement (AP) courses in many subjects. As a Catholic institution, the high school requires theology classes for all four years. Electives include art, yearbook, intro to broadcasting and many others to choose from.

Garces has one of the most successful sports programs in the history of the CIF-Central Section. The Garces sports teams, nicknamed the "Rams," compete in CIF Central Section. Most of the teams are placed in either Division 1 or Division 2. However, some of the sport teams are placed in lower divisions for playoffs. The school has won 120 valley championships, ranking it fourth all-time in the Central Section. On a particular note, the football team has won ten valley titles: 1953, 1971, 1985, 1986, 1987, 1988, 1996, 2002, 2006 and 2012. They were runners-up in 1968, 1969, 1991, 1995, 1999, 2011 and 2013.

Clubs and activities include mock trial, the theater company, Key Club, Ag Club and CLC. Formal and casual galas make up a major part of Garces's fundraising efforts. With help from the students, parents, alumni and the Garces community, numerous items are donated and auctioned off at these events.

== History ==
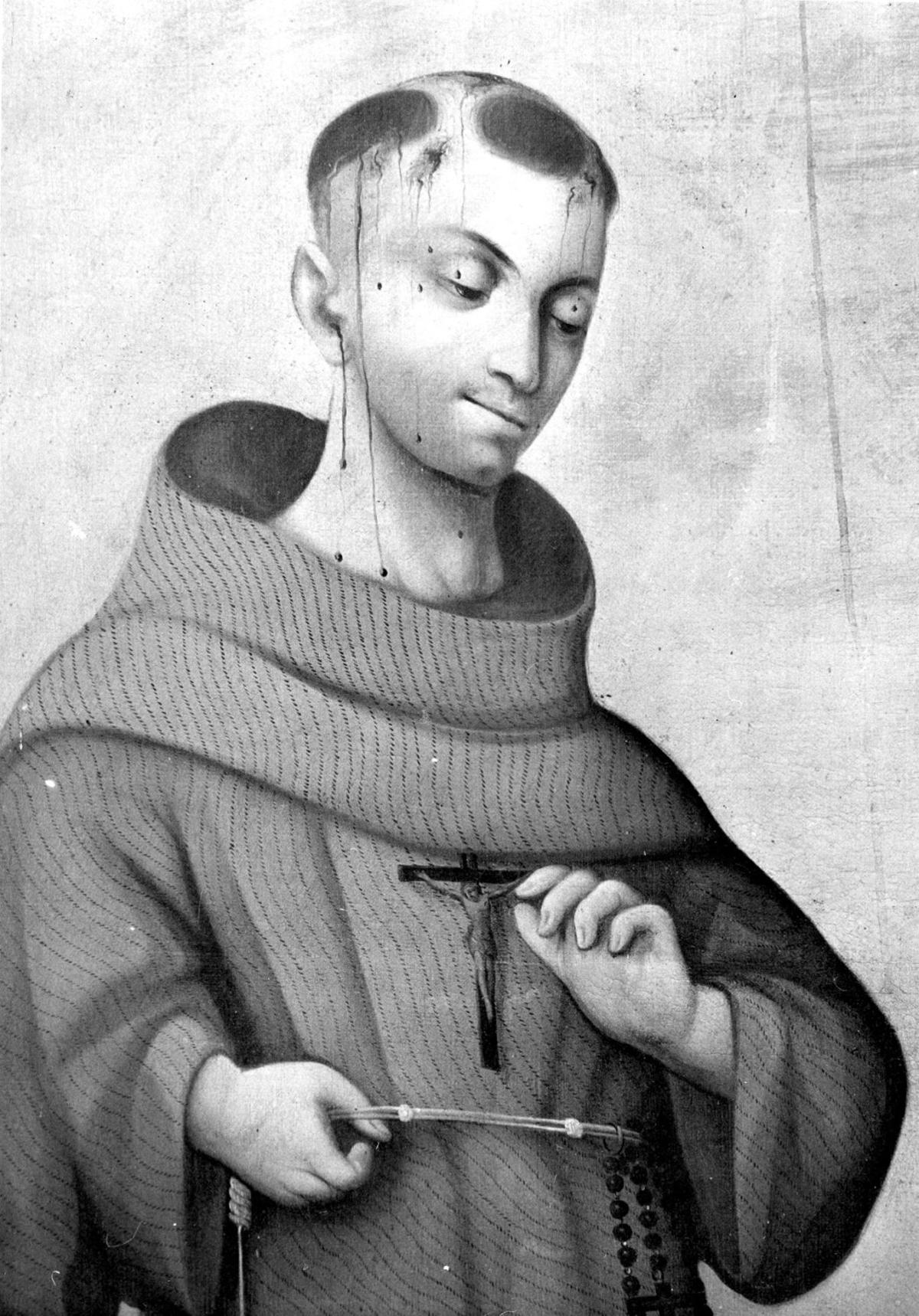
Garces Memorial High School is named after Spanish priest Francisco Garcés, who arrived in the Bakersfield area in 1776.

Founded in 1947, the school is named after Father Francisco Garcés, a Spanish Franciscan friar and missionary who explored much of the southwestern part of North America, including what is now the Bakersfield region. The school is located near the terminus of the Panorama (aka China Grade) Bluffs, on the exact site that Garces wrote would make a perfect place for a mission for the local Indian populace in his exploration of the Rio Bravo de San Felipe, now known as the Kern River. This site overlooks central Bakersfield atop a bluff that was once the delta of the Kern River.

In the early years, the Dominican Sisters' Congregation of St. Thomas Aquinas taught the girls and handled the school's administration and the Brothers of the Christian Schools (Christian Brothers) taught the boys. The Christian Brothers, due to financial issues within their order, withdrew from the school in 1971 and the school became fully co-educational. In 1978 the administration of the school was taken over by the laity and is currently overseen by the Fresno Diocesan Office of Education, who also oversees Garces' main rival, San Joaquin Memorial High School of Fresno.

In 2007, Garces celebrated its 60th anniversary.

On June 14, 2008, Principal Robert Garcia died from pneumonia at age 58, three years into his tenure.

In the fall of that year, Garces became the first high school in Bakersfield to have a boys and girls water polo team.

In 2011, Garces built a swimming pool on campus, making it the only high school in Bakersfield to have such a facility. It is used by the water polo and swim/dive teams. Tennis courts were later constructed.

In 2013, Garces High School became the first Kern County school to implement a 1:1 iPad program. Garces underwent many changes in the 2014–2015 school year. They added a girls and boys wrestling team, which came as a result of much support from the Garces community. They moved into the challenging Southwest Yosemite League. This was a testament to the hard work and dedication which student-athletes have demonstrated as well as the success of the sports teams.

New facilities on campus include the music/band building and a wing of the campus transformed for use by the wrestling team and dance classes. Recent upgrades to existing facilities include the weight room and football field.

== Notable alumni ==
- Mike Ariey, former Green Bay Packers lineman
- Frank Bidart, poet
- Gerald Haslam, author
- Joe Hernandez, former Washington Redskins & Edmonton Eskimos pro-football player
- Patrick Lencioni, author
- Bob McCaffrey, former Green Bay Packers center
- Justin Meyer, winemaker (Silver Oak Cellars)
- Greg Robinson, former defensive coordinator, Michigan; former head coach, Syracuse; former two-time Super Bowl-winning defensive coordinator of Denver Broncos
- Ken Ruettgers, former Green Bay Packers lineman
- Robert Swift, former Seattle SuperSonics & Oklahoma City Thunder pro-basketball player (Did not graduate from Garces)
