= Stanley Crawford =

American writer and farmer (1937–2024)

- Born: 1937
- Died: January 25, 2024 (aged 86); Dixon, New Mexico, U.S.
- Education: University of Chicago; University of Paris
- Occupations: Writer; farmer
- Writing career
- Notable awards: Western States Book Award (1988)

Stanley Crawford (1937 – January 25, 2024) was an American writer and farmer. His nine novels include, among others, Travel Notes (1967), The Log of the S.S. The Mrs Unguentine (1972), Some Instructions (1978), and Petroleum Man (2005). His nonfiction works include A Garlic Testament (1992), a biography of life on his farm in Dixon, New Mexico. Mayordomo: Chronicle of an Acequia in Northern New Mexico (1988) was the winner of the 1988 Western States Book Award for Creative Non-fiction.

== Life and career ==
Crawford was born in 1937 and grew up in a suburb of San Diego. He was educated at the University of Chicago and the Sorbonne in Paris. He met his Australian wife Rose Mary, a former reporter and publicist, in Crete in 1967 after he sold the film rights to his novel Gascoyne for $35,000 and had moved to the Island to write. They left Crete to spend six months in Ireland, during which their son Adam was born.

The couple moved from San Francisco to Dixon, New Mexico in 1969, where they owned El Bosque, a garlic farm. Their daughter Kate was born around that time. Crawford served for a time as the President of the Santa Fe Area Farmers' Market.

Crawford died of cancer in Dixon on January 25, 2024, at the age of 86.

== Works ==
- Crawford, Stanley (1966). Gascoyne. New York: Putnam. OCLC 1395235.
  - Reissued by Penguin, 2005. ISBN 978-1468307962.
- Crawford, Stanley (1968). Travel Notes (from here—to there). Simon & Schuster. OCLC 437091.
  - Reissued by Calamari Press, 2014. ISBN 978-1-940853-02-4.
- Crawford, Stanley (1972). The Log of the S.S. The Mrs Unguentine. Dalkey Archive Press. ISBN 1564785122.
- Crawford, Stanley (1978). Some Instructions. Dalkey Archive Press. ISBN 0916583155.
- Crawford, Stanley (1988). Mayordomo: Chronicle of an Acequia in Northern New Mexico. University of New Mexico Press. ISBN 0826309992.
  - Reissued by University of New Mexico Press, 1993. ISBN 0826314457.
- Crawford, Stanley (1998). A Garlic Testament: Seasons on a Small New Mexico Farm. University of New Mexico Press. ISBN 0826325319.
- Crawford, Stanley (2003). The River in Winter: New and Selected Essays. University of New Mexico Press. ISBN 978-0826328571.
- Crawford, Stanley (2005). Petroleum Man. Penguin. ISBN 978-1468307979.
- Crawford, Stanley (2015). Seed. Fiction Collective. ISBN 978-1573661836.
- Crawford, Stanley (2016). Intimacy. Fiction Collective. ISBN 978-1573660549.
- Crawford, Stanley (2017). Village: a novel. Leaf Storm Press. ISBN 978-1945652950.
- Crawford, Stanley (2019). The Garlic Papers: A Small Garlic Farm in the Age of Global Vampires. Leaf Storm Press. ISBN 978-1945652059
