= Monica Bill Barnes =

Monica Bill Barnes is an American dancer and choreographer best known for her works placed in public spaces.

== Early life ==
Barnes grew up in El Cerrito, California, near Berkeley. Her parents let her choose her middle name; she ended up going with Bill, her grandfather's name, over Snow White. In eighth grade, she wrote a narrative in which she would someday live in New York City involved in theater. Growing up she saw the The Alvin Ailey School during their annual appearances at the Zellerbach Hall on UC Berleley campus. She aspired to be that kind of dancer but later decided that was not the sort of dance for her.

== Education ==
Barnes is a graduate of El Cerrito High School where she studied dance under Jacqueline Burgess. She earned a B.A. in Philosophy from the University of California at San Diego and an MFA from New York University Tisch School of the Arts.

== Professional career ==
Barnes moved to New York in 1995 after graduating from UCSD. In 1997, she founded Monica Bill Barnes & Company. They began with "a suitcase of costumes and a collection of solos that could be performed anywhere."

After meeting Robbie Saenz de Viteri through a collaboration with Ira Glass titled "Three Acts, Two Dancers, One Radio Host", he joined the company. This is when they adopted the motto "Bringing dance where it doesn't belong." One critic described their anywhere-placed dance as satisfying "a very human voyeuristic impulse."

In addition to shows in over thirty cities across America and in other nations, she has choreographed for others, including the film Little Women.

In 2025, she was awarded a Guggenheim Fellowship in Choreography.
