= Bruce Berger =

American writer (1938–2021)

Bruce Nicolas Berger (August 21, 1938 – February 10, 2021) was an American nonfiction writer, poet and pianist. He was best known for a series of books exploring the intersections of nature and culture in desert environments. Berger's book The Telling Distance: Conversations with the American Desert won the 1990 Western States Book Award and the Colorado Book Award.

== Life and education ==
Berger was born in Evanston, Illinois, and grew up in the suburban Chicago village of Kenilworth. He was the only child of Nancy Lander and Robert Oscar Berger, an accountant and Kenilworth's mayor. After public school he attended The Lawrenceville School. He graduated from Yale University in 1961 with a B.A. in English. Berger did graduate work at the University of California, Berkeley, but did not pursue a doctorate.

== Career in music ==
Berger played piano professionally for three years in Spain, which was the source of his memoir The End of the Sherry.

== Essays, articles, and poetry ==
Berger's articles and essays were published in a number of literary quarterlies. For three years he was a contributing editor at American Airlines' magazine, American Way, and collaborated with photographer Miguel Ángel de la Cueva.

Berger published a poetry collection, Facing the Music. He was a three-time winner of the Colorado Authors' League Award for Poetry.

== Environmental interests ==
Berger was actively involved in environmental issues and wildlife preservation for the Southern Utah Wilderness Alliance, The Sierra Club, and The Glen Canyon Institute. For twenty years he was a board member of Niparajá, A. C. in Mexico.

== Berger Cabin ==
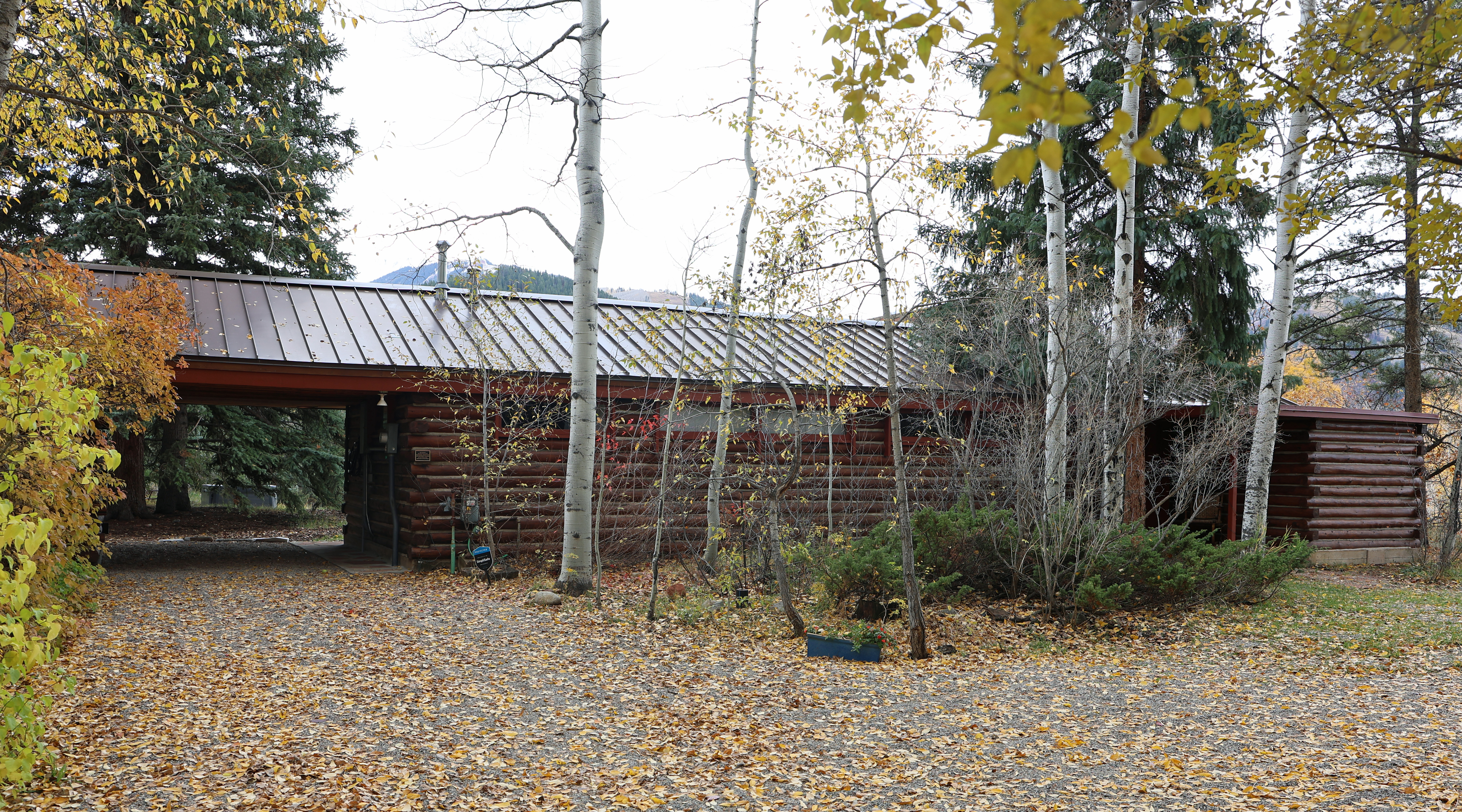
Berger Cabin

Berger's residence, known as the Berger Cabin, was added to the National Register of Historic Places in 2025. The Modernist, log-cabin style house was designed by architect Fritz Benedict and built in 1947. The property is at 835 West Main Street in Aspen, Colorado. Berger owned the house for 53 years.

== Awards and honors ==
- 2017: The first foreigner to be inducted into the state writers’ association of Baja California Sur, Escritores Sudcalifornianos, A. C.
- 2016: The Karen Chamberlain Lifetime Achievement Award in Poetry at the Headwaters Poetry Festival in Gunnison, Colorado.
- 2014: IPPY Award (silver medal) for The End of the Sherry
- 2012: Solas Award Grand Prize Bronze for "The Mysterious Fast Mumble" from Travelers' Tales, published in The Best Travel Writing of 2012
- 2006: ForeWord Magazine Silver Award for Book of the Year in the Nature category for Oasis of Stone: Visions of Baja California Sur, with photographs by Miguel Ãngel de la Cueva
- 2013: Colorado Authors’ League Award for Specialty Writing for Oasis of Stone: Visions of Baja California Sur
- 1990: The Western States Book Award for Creative Nonfiction for The Telling Distance: Conversations with the American Desert

== Publications ==
- Hangin' On: Gordon Snidow Portrays the Cowboy Heritage; Northland Press, 1980
- Notes of a Half-Aspenite; Ashley & Associates, 1987
- A Dazzle of Hummingbirds; Blake Publishing, 1989
- The Telling Distance: Conversations with the American Desert; Breitenbush Books, 1990; Anchor /Doubleday, 1991; The University of Arizona Press, 1997
- There Was A River; The University of Arizona Press, 1994
- Facing the Music (poetry); Confluence Press, 1995, (revised and reissued by Conundrum Books, 2015)
- Almost an Island; The University of Arizona Press, 1998
- Sierra, Sea and Desert: El Vizcaíno; Agrupación Sierra Madre, 1998
- Music in the Mountains; Johnson Books, 2001
- The Complete Half-Aspenite; WHO Press, 2005
- Oasis of Stone: Visions of Baja California Sur, in collaboration with photographer Miguel Ángel de la Cueva, Sunbelt Books, 2006
- La Giganta y Guadalupe, with co-author Exequiel Ezcurra and photographer Miguel Ángel de la Cueva, Niparajá, A. C., 2010
- The End of the Sherry, Aquitas Books, 2014
- A Desert Harvest: New and Selected Essays, Farrar, Straus and Giroux, 2019
