= Lawrence Coates =

American novelist

- Born: September 7, 1956 (age 69); Berkeley, California, U.S.
- Occupations: Writer, professor
- Writing career
- Notable awards: National Endowment for the Arts fellowship in Fiction, Western States Book Award for Fiction, The Donald Barthelme Prize - Gulf Coast (magazine) for Short Prose
- Website: www.lawrencecoates.com

Lawrence Coates is a novelist and former director of Bowling Green University's Master of Fine Arts program in creative writing.

Coates was educated at El Cerrito High School, University of California, Santa Cruz and University of Utah. He has also taught at Lycée Charlemagne and Southern Utah University.

== Novels ==
- The Blossom Festival (1999)
- The Master of Monterey: A Novel (2003)
- The Garden of the World (2012)
- The Goodbye House (2015)
- Camp Olvido (2015)
