= Keith H. Basso =

American anthropologist (1940–2013)

- Born: March 15, 1940; Asheville, North Carolina
- Died: August 4, 2013 (aged 73); Phoenix, Arizona
- Education: Harvard University (B.A., 1962), Stanford University (Ph.D., 1967)
- Known for: Study of language and place names of Western Apache
- Spouse: Gayle Potter-Basso
- Awards: Victor Turner Prize for Ethnographic Writing, 1997
- Scientific career
- Fields: Anthropology, Linguistics, Native American studies, Linguistic anthropology
- Workplaces: University of New Mexico, University of Arizona, Yale University
- Thesis: Heavy with Hatred: An Ethnographic Study of Western Apache Witchcraft (1967)

Keith Hamilton Basso (March 15, 1940 – August 4, 2013) was an American cultural and linguistic anthropologist noted for his study of the Western Apaches, specifically those from the community of Cibecue, Arizona. Basso was professor emeritus of anthropology at the University of New Mexico and earlier taught at the University of Arizona and Yale University.

== Early life ==
On 15 March 1940, Basso was born in Asheville, North Carolina to Etolia Simmons and Hamilton Basso. His mother, Etolia was a teacher. His father, Hamilton, was a novelist, essayist, and editor, notably of The New Yorker. They both had roots in New Orleans. He moved with his parents to Connecticut when his father took a position as a staff writer for the New Yorker. At Connecticut, he engaged in fly fishing during the day and moved around his father's literary circle in the evenings.

Early on, Basso was interested in reading literature and writing. His early inclination to anthropology started with Clyde Kluckhohn's classes at Harvard University where he completed his undergraduate studies in 1962 with magna cum laude honours. During these years, he spent the summer of 1959 in Arizona and began his "passion for horses, history, and the language and lives of White Mountain Apaches". He received his PhD in anthropology from Stanford University in 1967.

== Teaching ==
In 1967, he started teaching at the University of Arizona. Thereafter, in 1982, he moved to Yale University. He joined the University of New Mexico (UNM) in 1988, and served as Regents Professor, followed by Distinguished Professor of Anthropology. At UNM, he taught one semester each year and spent the rest of his time living and working on his ranch in Heber-Overgaard, Arizona. He retired at UNM in 2006.

== Research and writing ==
A classic contribution to ethnopoetics and the ethnography of speaking, Basso's 1979 book Portraits of the Whiteman examines complex cultural and political significance of jokes as a form of verbal art.

Basso was awarded the Victor Turner Prize for Ethnographic Writing in 1997 for his ethnography, Wisdom Sits in Places: Landscape and Language Among the Western Apache. The work was also the 1996 Western States Book Award Winner in Creative Nonfiction. In this ethnography, Basso expressed his hope that anthropologists will spend more time investigating how places and spaces are perceived and experienced; for human relationships to geographical places are rich, deeply felt, and profoundly telling.

== Awards ==
- 2001. SAR J. I. Staley Prize for Wisdom Sits in Places (1996).
- 1997. Victor Turner Prize for Ethnographic Writing for Wisdom Sits in Places (1996).
- 1996. Western States Book Award for Creative Nonfiction for Wisdom Sits in Places (1996).

== Personal life ==
Basso was married to Gayle Potter. In his 1988 article "Speaking with Names", he acknowledged her as 'partner in fieldwork as in everything else, whose steady encouragement, graceful acumen, and sheer good sense helped immeasurably in moving things.'

Basso died from cancer on August 4, 2013, at the age of 73, in Phoenix, Arizona.

== Works ==
=== Select bibliography ===
- Heavy with Hatred: An Ethnographic Study of Western Apache Witchcraft (Ph.D. thesis, Stanford University, 1967)
- Western Apache Witchcraft (1969)
- The Cibecue Apache (1970, 1986)
- Apachean Culture History and Ethnology, ed. Basso, Keith H, and Opler, Morris E. (1971)
- Goodwin, Greenville (compiler) (1971). Basso, Keith H (ed.). Western Apache Raiding and Warfare. Tucson, Arizona: University of Arizona Press. ISBN 0816502978. LCCN 73-142255.
- Meaning in Anthropology, ed. Basso, Keith H, and Selby, Henry A. (1976)
- Portraits of 'the Whiteman': Linguistic Play and Cultural Symbols among the Western Apache (1979)
- Western Apache Language and Culture: Essays in Linguistic Anthropology (1992)
- Wisdom Sits in Places: Landscape and Language among the Western Apache (1996)
- Senses of Place, ed. Keith H. Basso and Steven Feld (1996)
- Don’t Let the Sun Step Over You: A White Mountain Apache Family Life, 1860–1975 (2004), an oral history with Eva Tulene Watt
