= Dorielle Caimi =

American artist

- Born: 1985 (age 40–41)
- Education: Central New Mexico Community College (AA); Cornish College of the Arts (BFA)
- Known for: Painting

Dorielle Caimi (born 1985) is an American artist living and working in Santa Fe, New Mexico. She uses oil painting to depict figuration, vivid colors, and symbolism as reclamation and recompilation of societal ideas regarding women. Her work prioritizes the female gaze and personal experience.

== Education ==
Caimi began her formal drawing and painting studies at Central New Mexico Community College (2002–2004). After her high school graduation, she studied fine art at Susquehanna University, the University of New Mexico, and the Cornish College of the Arts, where she graduated with a BFA in 2010.

== Career ==
After earning her bachelor's degree, Caimi worked privately in Albuquerque, New Mexico for four years to create her first body of work, eleven paintings of the "modern, unretouched woman" which debuted at Gusford L.A. Caimi utilizes live models, her imagination, composite images, and sometimes her own body to create her paintings, juxtaposing contemporary and classical representations of female nudes by highlighting aspects not often portrayed in mainstream modern society such as tan lines, imperfections of the flesh, and poor posture. Caimi initially painted nude figures in order to avoid placing them in a specific era with fashion trends; later her nudes became a way of observing the raw human form and psyches without sexualizing them.

=== Awards and museum collections ===
Her works have been acquired by Miami University Art Museum and the Muskegon Museum of Art permanent collection.

In 2015 she was awarded the $10,000 William and Dorothy Yeck Award for work that "visually responds to painting in the 21st century" juried by LACMA's Franklin Sirmans, and in 2019 she was selected as one of ten finalists for the Bennett Prize For Women Figurative Realists.

== Selected exhibitions ==
Caimi has been actively exhibiting since 2010. Her most recent solo exhibition include Fleeting Epochs at Modern Eden Gallery, San Francisco, CA in 2018, Criticism in Times of Creation at Hiestand Gallery, Miami University, Oxford, OH in 2015-16, and Complex Candy at Gusford Gallery in Los Angeles, CA in 2014.
