= David Lee (poet) =

American poet (born 1944)

- Born: 1944 (age 81–82); Post, Texas, U.S.
- Education: Colorado State University; Utah State University (PhD)
- Occupation: Poet
- Writing career
- Notable awards: Western States Book Award (1995)

David Lee (born 1944) is an American poet and the first poet laureate of the state of Utah. His 1999 collection News From Down to the Café was nominated for the Pulitzer Prize for Poetry and, in 2001, he was a finalist for the position of United States Poet Laureate. He has been acclaimed by the Utah Endowment for the Humanities as one of the twelve greatest writers to ever emerge from the state. A former farmer, he is the subject of the PBS documentary The Pig Poet. His poems have appeared widely in publications including Poetry, Ploughshares, The Missouri Review, Narrative Magazine, and JuxtaProse Literary Magazine. He has been cited as an influence on writers such as Lance Larsen and Bonnie Jo Campbell.

== Life ==
Lee was born in Post, Texas and graduated from Colorado State University and took his PhD at Utah State University, for a current biography see Samara Press and Lee's most recent book, Rusty Barbed Wire. He published his first book of poetry, The Porcine Legacy, in 1974. Prior to his writing career he explored careers as a seminary student, pig farmer, and boxer. He was also the last white athlete to play on a Negro league baseball team, and the only one to do so after the dissolution of the Texas Blue Stars. Lee earned his PhD with a concentration in the poetry of John Milton and taught at Southern Utah University for three decades, where he served as Chairman of the Department of Language and Literature.

== Awards and honors ==
Lee served as Utah's inaugural poet laureate from 1997 to 2002 and later received the Utah Governor’s Award for lifetime achievement in the arts. He is the recipient of the Mountains & Plains Booksellers Award in Poetry and the Western States Book Award in Poetry. In 1999, his collection News From Down to the Café was nominated for the Pulitzer Prize for Poetry. In 2001, he was selected as a finalist for the position of United States Poet Laureate. His book So Quietly the Earth was among the 25 books chosen for the New York Public Library's 2004 "Books to Remember" list.

== Selected works ==
=== Poetry ===
- Porcine Legacy (Copper Canyon Press, 1974)
- Driving and Drinking. Copper Canyon Press. 1979. ISBN 978-1-55659-208-9.
- Shadow Weaver (Brooding Heron Press, 1984)
- The Porcine Canticles. Copper Canyon Press. 1984. ISBN 978-1-55659-209-6. (reprint 2004)
- Day’s Work (Copper Canyon Press, 1990)
- Paragonah Canyon (Brooding Heron Press, 1990)
- My Town (Copper Canyon Press, 1995)
- Covenants (with William Kloefkorn) (Spoon River Poetry Press, 1996)
- Wayburne Pig (Brooding Heron Press, 1997)
- The Fish (Wood Works Press, 1997)
- Twenty-one Gun Salute (Grey Spider Press, 1999)
- David Lee: A listener's Guide (Copper Canyon Press, 1999)
- A Legacy of Shadow: Selected Poems. Copper Canyon Press. 1999. ISBN 978-1-55659-097-9.
- News from Down to the Café: New Poems. Copper Canyon Press. 1999. ISBN 978-1-55659-132-7.
- Incident at Thompson Slough (Wood Works Press, 2002)
- So Quietly the Earth (Copper Canyon Press, 2004)
- Rusty Barbed Wire: Selected Poems (Samara Press, 2022)
