= Velma Wallis =

American novelist

- Born: 1960 (age 65–66); Near Fort Yukon, Alaska
- Occupation: Novelist
- Known for: Author of Two Old Women
- Children: 4

Velma May Wallis (born 1960) is an American writer of Gwich'in Athabascan Indian descent. Her books have been translated into 17 languages.

== Early life ==
Wallis was born and raised in a remote Alaskan village near Fort Yukon, approximately 200 km (120 mi) northeast of Fairbanks. This location can be accessed only by riverboat, airplane, snowmobile or dogsled.

== Personal life ==
Wallis, who has three daughters and a son, now divides her time between Fairbanks and Fort Yukon.

== Awards ==
- 2023 Gratitude Award, from the Women Who Dared.
- 2003 American Book Award, for Raising Ourselves: A Gwich'in Coming of Age Story from the Yukon territory River
- 1993 Western States Book Award

== Bibliography ==
- Two Old Women: An Alaskan Legend Of Betrayal, Courage And Survival. Epicenter Press. 1993. ISBN 978-0-7043-4424-2.
- Bird Girl and the Man Who Followed the Sun. Epicenter Press. 1996. ISBN 978-0-945397-34-2.
- Raising Ourselves: A Gwich'in Coming of Age Story from the Yukon River. Epicenter Press. 2003. ISBN 978-0-9724944-7-2.
