= Kate Horsley =

American historical fiction writer

- Born: Kate Parker; 1952 (age 73–74); Richmond, Virginia, U.S.

Academic background
- Education: University of New Mexico (PhD)

Academic work
- Discipline: English
- Sub-discipline: Fiction; Historical fiction Western fiction
- Institutions: Central New Mexico Community College

Kate Horsley (born 1952) is the pen name of Kate Parker, an American author of numerous works of historical fiction, three of which are rooted in the Old West. Parker is also a professor of English at Central New Mexico Community College in Albuquerque. Much of her work has been influenced by Zen after reading material by Alan Watts.

== Early life and education ==
Parker was born in Richmond, Virginia in 1952, the youngest of five children. As a teenager, Parker became active in the Civil rights movement and anti-Vietnam war activism. While writing her master's thesis, Parker relocated to the Laguna Pueblo to work with writer Leslie Marmon Silko. After completing her degree, she remained in New Mexico and earned a PhD in American studies from the University of New Mexico.

== Career ==
She published a collection of short works entitled "X&O." She won the Kenneth Patchen Award for Innovative Fiction for the novel "Between the Legs," which was published in the fall of 2015. Previously, she won the Western States Arts Award for Fiction and the New Mexico Press Women's Award for Fiction.

== Works ==
- "Crazy Woman" (1992)
- A Killing in New Town (1996)
- Confessions of a Pagan Nun (2002)
- The Changeling of Finnistuath (2003)
- Careless Love: Or the Land of Promise (2003)
- Black Elk in Paris (2007)

== Personal life ==
Married three times, she had a son by her second husband. Her son was hit by a car and killed on April 9, 2000.
