= Two Old Women =

Novel by Velma Wallis

Two Old Women: An Alaskan Legend Of Betrayal, Courage And Survival
- First edition
- Author: Velma Wallis
- Language: English
- Genre: novel
- Publisher: Epicenter Press, Fairbanks/Seattle
- Publication date: 1993
- Publication place: United States
- ISBN: 978-0-7043-4424-2
- Followed by: Bird Girl and the Man Who Followed the Sun (1996)

Two Old Women: An Alaskan Legend Of Betrayal, Courage And Survival is a 1993 novel by Velma Wallis, set in northeastern Alaska.

== Plot summary ==
Long before the Europeans came, nomads roamed the polar region of Alaska in constant search for game. The people of the Gwich'in, who belong to the Athabaska tribes, wander the areas around the Yukon River, the Porcupine River, the Tanana River and their tributaries.

Because of a lack of food and an upcoming harsh winter, one of these Gwich'in nomad groups decides to leave behind two old women in the snow-covered wilderness: 75-year-old Sa' and 80-year-old Ch'idzigyaak. Before moving on, Ch'idzigyaak's daughter gives them an untanned moose's skin, or babiche. As another familial gesture, Ch'idzigyaak's grandson hides his osseous hatchet, which is the symbol of his manhood, for the two women. The tribe leaves. Left by themselves, the two women at first sit silently. In their desperation, however, they decide it is better to die trying to survive than to not try at all. Sa' succeeds in killing a squirrel using the hatchet as a weapon. The two women boil the meat and drink the broth. They then go on to set rabbit traps and in the middle of the night wake to animal noises: they find two rabbits in their traps. The women decide to move on to hunt better game. In order to cross the snow, they make themselves snowshoes. Eventually, they reach a river where their tribe had fished successfully in the warmer season. On each night of their journey of several days, the women dig a snow shelter protected by animal hides. They save the embers of their campfires to start a new fire the next evening. In this way, the fire never goes out. In the mornings, the two old women complain about their pains in the joints. Finally they reach their familiar river and set up a winter camp there. However, they hide inland from The People, another tribe, for fear of cannibalism. Fortunately, the two old women succeed in building up a generous supply of food made up of smoked muskrats and beavers. In the summer, they catch large amounts of fish and manage to dry and store them away.

Next winter, the tribe returns to the area where the two women were left. The leader concludes that the two women must have survived because there is no sign of them. He believes that if they can find the women, the tribe might be able to muster a new sense of survival, for his people are starving after having had little hunting luck all through winter. The leader sends off Daagoo, a tracker, and a few young warriors to locate the women. The weak group staggers away. But Daagoo picks up the scent of smoke, and before long they track down the women's camp. The two women at first do not trust the small group but Daagoo gives both of them his word: the men want peace with the two women. Sa' and Ch'idzigyaak hesitate for a long time. In the end they sense that Daagoo is honest. They submit to his request for they had been in fact very lonely, missing their home tribe a lot. However, they do not admit this right away. In spite of their deep mistrust, their hearts grow soft again. So in the end the two old women deliver rations of food to their own people. Ch'idzigyaak's grandson makes an effort to visit them in the camp, but the daughter is still ashamed and does not visit for a while. In the end, however, the daughter finally visits the mother.

From then on the Gwich'in never leave their elderly behind.

== Awards ==
- Winner, Western States Book Award, Creative nonfiction, 1993

== Editions ==
- Velma Wallis (November 5, 2013). Two Old Women: An Alaska Legend of Betrayal, Courage and Survival. Harper Perennial. ISBN 978-0-06-224499-4. (reprint 2004)
- Velma Wallis: Two Old Women: An Alaskan Legend Of Betrayal, Courage And Survival, The Women's Press Ltd, (UK), 2000, 160 p., ISBN 978-0-7043-4424-2, ISBN 0-7043-4424-6
- Velma Wallis: Zwei alte Frauen. Eine Legende von Verrat und Tapferkeit, translated into German by Christel Dormagen 129 p. Munich 1994, ISBN 3-492-24034-8.
- Velma Wallis: Las dos ancianas, Ediciones B., Barcelona 1996. Translated into Spanish by Javier Alfaya.
- Velma Wallis: To kvinder - en Alaska-legende om forræderi, mod og overlevelse. Danish, ISBN 87-557-1906-6

== Note ==
This article is based on the corresponding article in the German Wikipedia from 2007-9-30.
