= Central New Mexico Community College =

College in Albuquerque, New Mexico, US

Coordinates: 35°04′26″N 106°37′35″W

- Type: Public community college
- Established: 1964
- Academic affiliations: Space-grant
- President: Tracy Hartzler
- Faculty: 328 full-time; 653 part-time
- Students: 22,278
- Location: Albuquerque, New Mexico, United States
- Campus: Urban, 303.93 acres
- Colors: Blue and Yellow
- Mascot: Sol the Suncat
- Website: www.cnm.edu

Central New Mexico Community College (CNM), formerly Technical Vocational Institute (TVI), is a public community college based in Albuquerque, New Mexico. Founded in 1964, CNM offers associate degrees, professional certificates, and training options.

CNM has the largest undergraduate student enrollment in the state and is located across several campuses and training sites in the Albuquerque metropolitan area. As of Fall 2018, CNM had 21,398 students and 18,000 individuals enrolled in non-credit workforce training, industry testing for credentials/licensures and adult basic education.

== History ==
Following authorization by the New Mexico Legislature in 1963, CNM (then TVI) was approved by district voters in 1964 to provide adults with skills to gain employment and succeed. The college opened on July 1, 1965, at the site of where its Main Campus stands.

TVI was accredited by the North Central Association of Colleges and Schools in 1978 and given degree-granting power by the State Legislature in 1986, at which point TVI became a community college. In 2006, TVI changed its name to Central New Mexico Community College.

Today, CNM is the largest higher education institution in New Mexico based on enrollment. The college has many transfer articulation agreements with four-year institutions around the state, including the University of New Mexico.

== Governance and funding ==
CNM's Governing Board consists of seven members elected to four-year terms from districts within the overall College district. The Governing Board is responsible for policies that govern all phases of the educational programs at the college.

CNM funding comes from a property tax levy in the college's service district, as well as appropriations by the New Mexico Legislature.

== Campuses and facilities ==
CNM has five campuses in Albuquerque and one campus location in Rio Rancho. Main, Montoya and Rio Rancho campuses have libraries; Westside, South Valley and Advanced Technology Center (ATC) campuses have Learning Commons.

- Main Campus: Located near downtown Albuquerque, Main Campus has over 15 buildings with classrooms and offices covering 75 acres. The campus opened in 1965.
- Montoya Campus: Representing CNM in Albuquerque's Northeast Heights neighborhood, the Joseph M. Montoya Campus covers 43 acres. The campus opened in 1979.
- South Valley Campus: An integral part of the South Valley community, the South Valley Campus was opened in 1995 partially at the request of South Valley residents. The campus is set on eight acres.
- Westside Campus: Located 22 miles from the Main Campus on 108 acres, the Westside campus has students from the Rio Rancho, Taylor Ranch, Paradise Hills and Ventana Ranch communities. The campus opened in 2003.
- ATC: Located in Albuquerque's Northeast Heights on 21 acres, the ATC is 80,000 square feet of laboratory and classroom space for the Applied Technologies programs.
- Rio Rancho Campus: Opened in 2010, the Rio Rancho campus was made possible after voters approved expanding CNM's taxing district in 2007. It covers 40 acres.
- In addition to these campuses, CNM Ingenuity's WORKforce Training Center (NE Heights), STEMulus Center (downtown) and FUSE Makerspace (downtown) locations in Albuquerque house these CNM Ingenuity programs.

== Academics ==
CNM offers associate degrees and certificates in more than 90 fields of study over its seven schools:

- School of Business, Hospitality & Technology
- School of Education
- School of Health, Wellness & Public Safety
- School of Liberal Arts
- School of Mathematics, Science & Engineering
- School of Nursing & Patient Support
- School of Skilled Trades & Arts

CNM also provides distance learning and dual credit opportunities.

== Community education and development ==
CNM Ingenuity Inc. is a non-profit corporation created by Central New Mexico Community College (CNM) under the New Mexico Research Park Act in 2014. CNM Ingenuity Inc. promotes the public welfare through economic development via its programs, partnerships and initiatives that meet workforce needs.

Programs and initiatives under CNM Ingenuity include:

- Deep Dive Coding
- FUSE Makerspace
- WORKforce Training
- IGNITE Community Accelerator

== Student life ==
There are over 20 CNM student-run clubs and organizations, including LGBTQ+ at CNM, Improv Club, HackerSpace and Speech and Debate.

The Executive Council of Students (ECOS) represents student issues to administration, faculty and staff. ECOS also develops policies that affect the student body, promotes student leadership and works on scholarship funding through state and local legislative structures.

== Environmental recognition ==
CNM was accorded a STARS Silver rating in October 2016 for sustainability efforts involving operations, academics, engagement, planning, administration and innovation.

The following construction/renovations have also been LEED certified:

New Construction

- 2011: Rio Rancho Campus (RR), LEED Gold
- 2012: The Student Resource Center (SRC), LEED Silver
- 2016: Westside I Building (WSI), LEED Silver
- 2021: Education Collaborative (EC), LEED Silver
- 2021: Marketplace @ CNM, LEED Silver

Major Renovations

- 2013: Jeannette Stromberg Hall (JS), LEED Gold
- 2014: Tom Wiley Hall (TW), LEED Silver
- 2016: Robert P. Matteucci Hall (RPM), LEED Gold
- 2016: Laboratory (L) Building, LEED Gold
- 2017: Ted F. Martinez (TM) Building, LEED Silver
- 2019: Smith Brasher Hall (SB) Building, LEED Gold
- 2019: Richard Barr (RB) Building, LEED Gold
- 2021: Max Salazar Hall (MS), LEED Platinum

Interior Design & Construction

- 2013: Advanced Technology Center (ATC), LEED Gold
- 2017: South Valley I (SVI), LEED Silver

== Notable people ==
=== Alumni ===
- Dorielle Caimi, painter
- Derrick Lente, member of the New Mexico House of Representatives
- Patrick M. Brenner, political commentator

=== Faculty ===
- Mark Rudd, activist and mathematics instructor
- Kate Horsley, author and English professor
