= Sky-Walk =

1798 novel by Charles Brockden Brown

Sky-Walk (alternatively Sky Walk, Skywalk, etc.) is the first completed novel by Charles Brockden Brown. It was started in 1797 and completed by March 1798, when an “Excerpt” was published in The Weekly Magazine of Original Essays, Fugitive Pieces, and Interesting Intelligence. The novel was subsequently lost, though Brown's later novel Edgar Huntly takes up the same themes as Sky-Walk, most notably, that of sleepwalking. Like Brown's other novels, Sky-Walk is an example of the American Gothic novel.

== Publication and reception ==
On March 17, 1798, an advertisement appeared in The Weekly Magazine for the novel entitled Sky-Walk, or, The Man Unknown to Himself: An American Tale. This advertisement, signed “Speratus”, introduces both the novel and the author as new and revolutionary, remarking that the author “does not rest his hopes upon the indulgence due to the unripeness of his age, and limitedness of his experience”. It also assures the reader that the novel is, at least in part, “a picture of truth. Facts have supplied the foundation of the whole”. Using newspaper stories and other real life events to draw upon for his novels was a well-known device of Brown's, such as in the case of Wieland, though the authenticity of this claim in the case of either Sky-Walk or Edgar Huntly is in doubt, as the newspaper which Brown claims to have read the inspirational story in does not appear to have been available to him.

The advertisement espouses similar conceptions of the moral obligation of literature to that which Brockden Brown also maintained, criticizing popular literature as “deficient” in its lack of “views into human nature and all the subtleties of reasoning”. The cognomen “Speratus” was popular among contributors to periodicals and was one that Charles Brockden Brown used himself. This knowledge gives scholars reason to believe that the advertisement was written by Brown, and most tend to attribute the comments made in the advertisement to Brown rather than to the unknown Speratus.

The excerpt itself was published the following week, on March 24, 1798, by James Watters, the printer who owned The Weekly Magazine. Watters died of yellow fever and Sky-Walk was left with executors who refused to finish printing it due to the unreliability of its success, as Brown was a new author. The executors also set the price of the manuscript (or what was finished of it) too high for Brown to repurchase, and it was thus lost.

Sky-Walk was circulated among Brockden Brown's friends, and William Dunlap and Elihu Hubbard Smith each responded to the novel in their diaries in April 1798. From their commentary it could be gathered that Sky-Walk contained elements of somnambulism, or sleepwalking, and featured the landscape of Delaware, though whether or not it included mention of the Lenni Lenape tribe (a major concern in Edgar Huntly) remains in contention

Following the publication of the extract, a correspondent wrote to the magazine inquiring after the title of the novel. The respondent explained that, “‘Sky-Walk’ represented ‘a popular corruption of ‘Ski Wakee,’ or Big Spring”, the Native American name of the Delaware setting that Brown uses in the novel. This response may indicate that Brown had at least started to develop a concern for the Lenni Lenape tribe in Sky-Walk, though it may not have been as major of a theme as it became in Edgar Huntly. The only reference found for ‘Ski Wakee’ was from the Algonquian language, and the meaning was “fresh or new earth or ground”. It is likely that both the correspondent and respondent were Charles Brockden Brown himself, having signed the query “A.Z.”, initials he used in other publications by The Weekly Magazine around the same time. This tendency to self-promote under different cognomens supports the theory that Speratus, too, was Brockden Brown.

== Excerpt ==
Sky-Walk is told from the first-person perspective of an unnamed narrator. It opens with the narrator relating his unhappy circumstances being in a position of obligation to his patroness. The narrator then explains that while he had been traveling, he had formed an acquaintance with an Irish merchant just recently out of apprenticeship in Bourdeaux. The Irishman, later named Annesley by the narrator, is married and has two children, and quickly realizes his dream of ending his profession with enough income to return to Ireland and support his family. Annesley then leaves for Ireland, to purchase an estate while his family remained in Bourdeaux. The narrator awaits his return, though upon Annesley's arrival, his friend immediately disappears, and the narrator reflects on this mysterious behavior.

Not long after, the narrator visits a prison to investigate a claim of debt against a tenant of Mrs. Courtney (presumably, the narrator's patroness). While at the prison, the narrator finds Annesley in a similar situation to the tenant. Annesley and his father had taken up joint security for a debt, from which the debtor flees, and with the death of his father, Annesley alone is held responsible for the debt. Though Annesley had enough income to pay off this debt and purchase the estate he hoped for, the creditor purposefully misled Annesley into believing the debtor had paid and Annesley was without obligation. Annesley was arrested as soon as he arrived back in Ireland, and his belongings, which included the fortune he had amassed, were stolen.

The narrator takes it upon himself then to go to the creditor and make an appeal. The creditor, realizing that Annesley's poverty meant he would likely never be paid, becomes enraged and decides to punish Annesley to the full extent of the law. The narrator, disgusted with the creditor, attempts to locate Annesley's stolen property, but to no avail, and his own income is insufficient to assist his friend. The narrator's patroness discovers the narrator's distress and pays off the debt while also transferring an estate to Annesley. The excerpt ends here.

== Comparison to Edgar Huntly ==
The notes of Brown's friends William Dunlap and Elihu Smith provide some insight into Sky-Walk, particularly the text's relationship to Edgar Huntly, Brown's later novel published in 1799, over ten years after the completion and subsequent loss of Sky-Walk. Dunlap's commentary on the differences between Sky-Walk and Edgar Huntly notes that while the latter includes important plot points regarding the Delaware tribe, Sky-Walk focused primarily on sleepwalking, though the setting in Norwalk remained the same. Smith's thoughts on the novel confirm that the concept of sleepwalking seems to be the major focal point of Sky-Walk. Why Brown added the element of Native American hostility in the succeeding novel is unclear, but Brown is known for his desire to produce literature that was wholly "American", and thus replaced many of the Gothic elements found in European literature with new devices that would reflect the American "experience, values, and language".

The prologue to Edgar Huntly includes what would seem to be an extract from the Vienna Gazette of June 14, 1784. The extract tells of a woman shot dead by a chronic sleepwalker who had performed the deed while sleeping, "entirely unknown to himself". This phrase is the subtitle to Sky-Walk and it could be supposed that this article, if indeed it existed, was the basis for that novel as well. Though Brown did indeed draw on real-life instances for his novels, such as the James Yates murders and the Yellow Fever endemic, in the case of Sky-Walk or Edgar Huntly, the authenticity of this article is held in doubt. It appears that the journal he claimed to have found the article in was not in operation in 1784 and no one has yet uncovered any mention of a similar sleepwalking incident in other journals of this time.

== Themes ==
The notes of Brown's friends and the published extract are the only evidence remaining of Sky-Walk's intended content. Brown had taken up the idea of sleepwalking as a source of psychological horror but his concerns with the recently revolutionized America are also apparent in both Sky-Walk and Edgar Huntly.

=== Sleepwalking ===
The notes of William Dunlap and Elihu Smith corroborate that Sky-Walk had focused on somnambulism as its major theme, though the published extract does not hint at this. Brown's interest in sleepwalking as a way to uncover the state of mind is evident from his later use of it in Edgar Huntly and the short story "Somnambulis. A fragment", written before Edgar Huntly though not published until 1805.

The Gothic horror of sleepwalking lies in the sleepwalker's inability to control himself and his actions, as well as the aspect of the unknown. What happens while the sleepwalker is asleep is unknown to him when he is awake, and this device allows Brown to build up the mystery and horror in his novel. Sleepwalking also expresses a dual nature. The actions of the man asleep and the man awake are entirely opposite.

=== Revolution ===
Charles Brockden Brown lived through the American Revolutionary War, and his concerns for America and its recently revolutionized ideals are apparent in many of his works. Brown's parents were pacifist Quakers, and his father was exiled to Virginia in 1777, during the British occupation of Philadelphia. Brockden Brown was later sent to the Friends' Latin School in Philadelphia to study under Robert Proud, also a Quaker and an opponent of the war. Brown's parents wanted him to become a lawyer, but Brown was very troubled by the idea of justice that the new America appeared to represent, particularly the "precedence that financial gain claimed over morality and justice". This concern is apparent in Sky-Walk, when the narrator struggles with the creditor to release Annesley from prison. Brown's concerns with freedom and revolution are also indicative in the narrator's dissatisfaction with his patroness.

The setting from the extract of Sky-Walk is Ireland (it must be assumed from the emphasis of a Delaware setting in the notes of Dunlap and Smith that the narrator later moves to Delaware). Ireland, at this time, was associated with radicalism. In Edgar Huntly it is Clithero who is the Irish exile, in Sky-Walk it appears to be the character of Annesley. Some scholars have asserted that the device of sleepwalking is in itself an allegory of post-revolutionary America, citing that Brown's sleepwalkers share similarities to the "political representative as a 'puppet' of the people'" and those who are "'monstrously' independent of his constituents' intentions".

== Bibliography ==
- Brown, Charles Brockden. Edgar Huntly, or, Memoirs of a sleep-walker. Ed. Sydney J. Krause and S.W. Reid. The Kent State University Press, 1984. ISBN 0-87338-342-7.
