= 1799 in literature =

This article contains information about the literary events and publications of 1799.

== Events ==
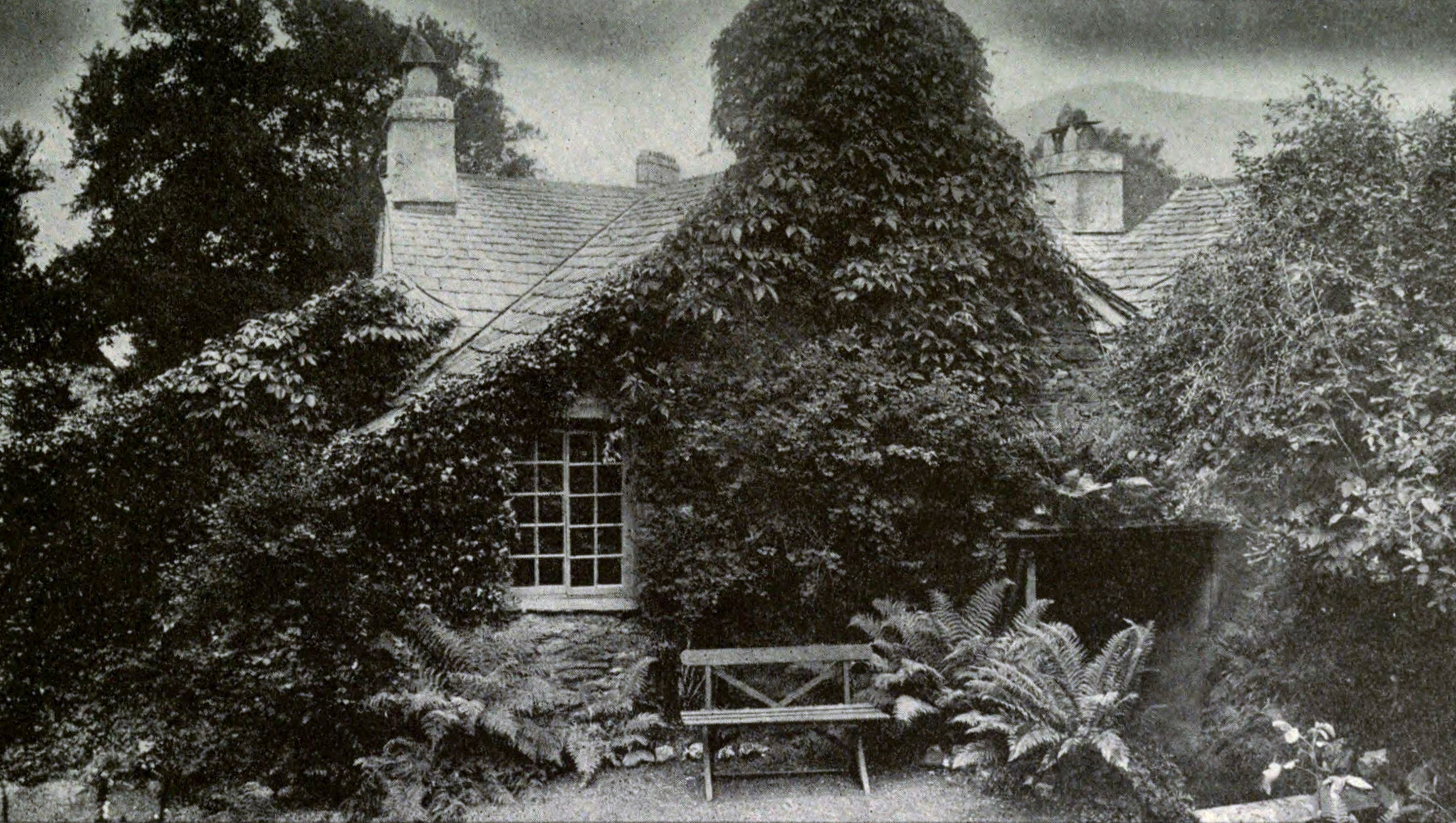
Dove Cottage

- Premières of the second and third parts of Friedrich Schiller's dramatic trilogy Wallenstein are performed at the Weimarer Hoftheater under Johann Wolfgang von Goethe:
  - January 30 – Die Piccolomini.
  - April 20 – Wallensteins Tod (Wallenstein's Death) as Wallenstein.
- April 13 – John Lamb dies. He was the father of both Charles and Mary Lamb. Charles becomes his sister's legal guardian.
- May 8 – The Religious Tract Society is established as an evangelical publisher in Paternoster Row, London; it continues as The Lutterworth Press into the 21st century.
- December 20 – William Wordsworth and his sister Dorothy first take up residence at Dove Cottage, Grasmere. William completes the first version of The Prelude during the year.
- unknown dates
  - A new edition of Edward Young's Night Thoughts is illustrated by Thomas Stothard.
  - The Monthly Magazine and American Review starts publication in the United States, edited by Charles Brockden Brown.

== New books ==
=== Fiction ===
- Anonymous – Village Orphan
- Charles Brockden Brown
  - Arthur Mervyn
  - Edgar Huntly
  - Ormond
- Thomas Campbell – The Pleasures of Hope
- T. J. Horsley Curties – Ethelwina, Or The House of Fitz-Auburne
- Elizabeth Gunning – The Gipsey Countess
- Mary Hays – The Victim of Prejudice
- Friedrich Hölderlin – Hyperion, vol. 2
- William Henry Ireland – The Abbess
- Jane West – A Tale of the Times
- Mary Julia Young – The East Indian

=== Children ===
- François Guillaume Ducray-Duminil – Les Cinquante Francs de Jeannette (Jeanette's Fifty Francs)
- Edward Augustus Kendall
  - The Crested Wren. A Tale
  - The Canary Bird. A moral fiction interspersed with poetry
- Dorothy Kilner (as M. Pelham) – Rational Brutes, or Talking Animals

=== Drama ===
- Thomas John Dibdin
  - The Birth Day
  - Five Thousand a Year
- William Dunlap – The Italian Father
- Joseph George Holman – The Votary of Wealth
- Elizabeth Inchbald – The Wise Man of the East
- Kamesuke – Picture Book of the Taiko (kabuki)
- Matthew Lewis – The East Indian
- Edward Morris – The Secret
- Frederick Reynolds – Management
- Friedrich von Schiller – Wallensteins Tod
- Richard Brinsley Sheridan – Pizarro
- Oscar Wegelin – The Natural Daughter
- Thomas Sedgwick Whalley – The Castle of Montval

=== Non-fiction ===
- Hannah Adams – A Summary History of New-England
- Hannah More – Strictures on the Modern System of Female Education
- Lady Charlotte Murray – The British Garden
- Philip Yorke – The Royal Tribes of Wales

== Births ==
- January 31 – Rodolphe Töpffer, Swiss teacher, author, and artist (died 1846)
- February 4
  - Almeida Garrett, Portuguese writer (died 1854)
  - Thomas Kibble Hervey, Scottish-born poet and critic (died 1859)
- March – Dorothea Tieck, German translator (died 1841)
- March 12 – Mary Howitt, English writer, poet and translator (died 1888)
- March 13 – Maria Dorothea Dunckel, Swedish poet, translator and dramatist (died 1878)
- March 20 – Karl August Nicander, Swedish poet (died 1839)
- April 17 – Eliza Acton, English poet and cookery writer (died 1859)
- May 13 – Catherine Gore, English author (died 1861)
- May 20 – Honoré de Balzac, French novelist (died 1850)
- May 23 – Thomas Hood, English poet (died 1845)
- June 6 – Aleksandr Pushkin, Russian dramatist and poet (died 1837)
- October 9 – Louisa Stuart Costello Irish writer on travel and history (died 1870)
- November 29 – Amos Bronson Alcott, American writer, philosopher, and reformer (died 1888)
- December 30 – John Moultrie, English poet and hymnist (died 1874)
- unknown date – Rallou Karatza, Greek Wallachian translator and theatrical promoter (died 1870)

== Deaths ==
- February 19 – Jean-Charles de Borda, French engineer and memoirist (born 1733)
- February 24 – Georg Christoph Lichtenberg, German satirist (born 1742)
- April 24 – William Seward, English man of letters (born 1747)
- May 18 – Pierre Beaumarchais, French dramatist (born 1732)
- August 30 – Eleonora Fonseca Pimentel, Italian poet and revolutionary (executed, born 1751)
- December 31 – Jean-François Marmontel, French historian, writer (born 1723)
