= 1859 in literature =

This article contains information about the literary events and publications of 1859.

== Events ==
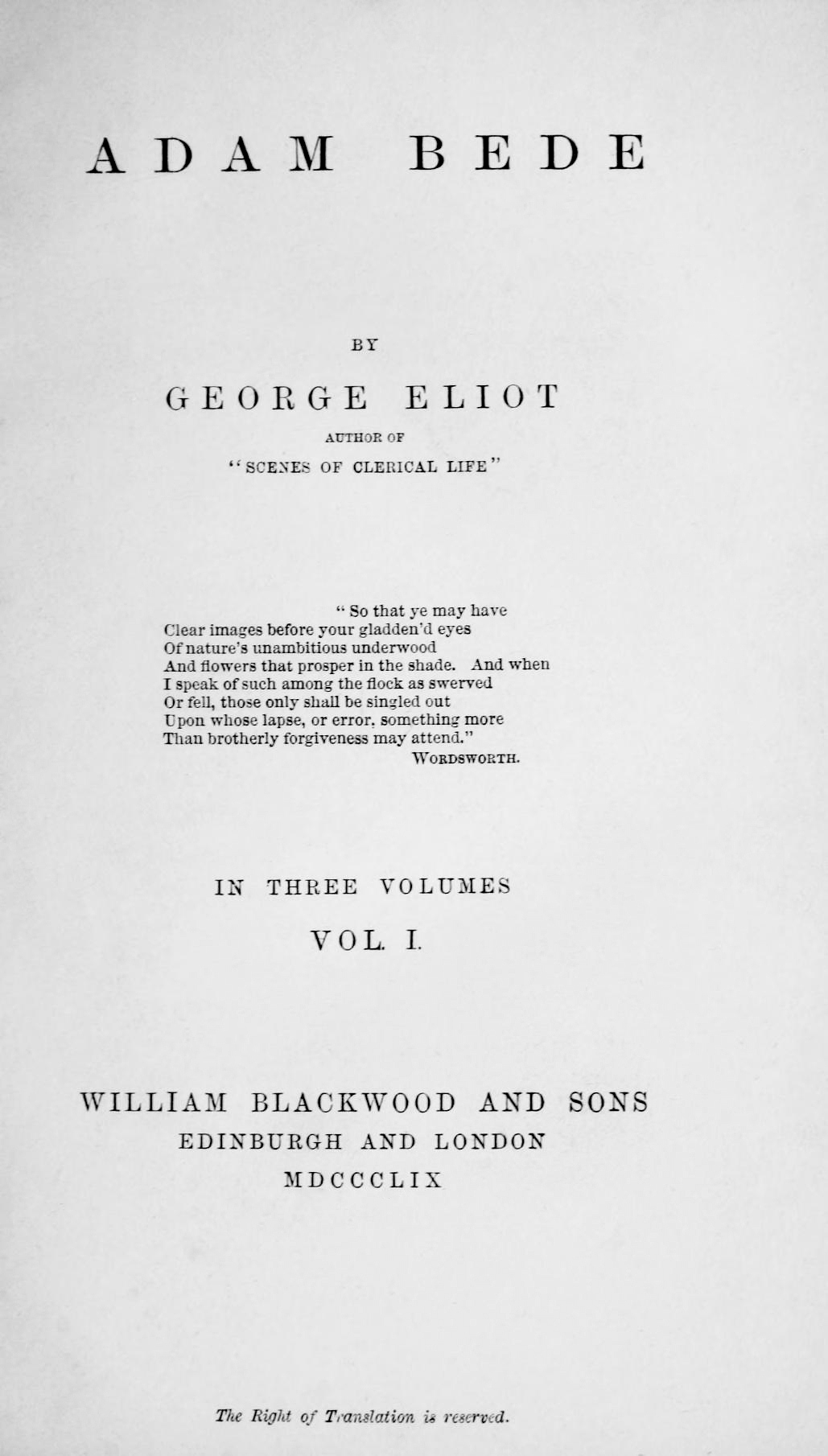
1st ed.

- c. January – Tidskrift för hemmet (Home Review), the first women's magazine in the Nordic countries, is founded by Sophie Leijonhufvud and Rosalie Olivecrona in Stockholm (Sweden).
- February 1 – George Eliot's Adam Bede, her first full-length novel, is published by John Blackwood in the United Kingdom. Contemporary reviews are largely positive, describing it as "of the highest class". and "first-rate"; However, it is also accused of being "vile outpourings of a lewd woman's mind" and circulating libraries refuse to stock it or will supply it only under the counter.
- February 4 – German scholar Constantin von Tischendorf identifies portions of the mid-4th century Codex Sinaiticus (an uncial manuscript of the Greek Bible) at Saint Catherine's Monastery on Mount Sinai in the Khedivate of Egypt and arranges for its presentation to his patron, Tsar Alexander II of Russia at Saint Petersburg.
- April 30 – Charles Dickens's weekly magazine All the Year Round is published for the first time in London, succeeding Household Words and containing the first serial installment of his historical novel A Tale of Two Cities.
- June–July – Frances Harper's "The Two Offers", the first English-language short story by an African American author, is published in the first volume of The Anglo-African Magazine (New York).
- September – Twenty three-year-old Isabella Beeton's Mrs Beeton's Book of Household Management begins publication as a partwork supplement to The Englishwoman's Domestic Magazine, published by her husband Samuel Orchart Beeton in London.
- November 26 – Wilkie Collins's The Woman in White, an early example of mystery fiction, begins serialisation in All the Year Round.
- unknown date – The first translation of Adam Mickiewicz's Polish epic poem Pan Tadeusz (1834) into another language, Belarusian, is made by the writer and dramatist Vintsent Dunin-Martsinkyevich, in Vilnius, but pressure from the authorities of the ruling Russian Empire means he is able to publish only the first two chapters.

== New books ==
=== Fiction ===
- Ana Luísa de Azevedo Castro – D. Narcisa de Villar
- George Webbe Dasent – Popular Tales from the Norse (translation from Peter Christen Asbjørnsen and Jørgen Moe's collection Norske folkeeventyr)
- Charles Dickens – A Tale of Two Cities
- Fyodor Dostoevsky – The Village of Stepanchikovo («Село Степанчиково и его обитатели», Selo Stepanchikovo i evo obitateli)
- George Eliot
  - Adam Bede
  - The Lifted Veil
- Augusta Jane Evans – Beulah
- Ivan Goncharov – Oblomov («Обломов»)
- Mary Jane Holmes – Dora Deane
- Charles Lever – Davenport Dunn: A Man of our Day
- Hector Malot – Les Amants (The Lovers)
- George Meredith – The Ordeal of Richard Feverel
- John Neal — True Womanhood: A Tale
- Viktor Rydberg – Den siste Atenaren (The Last Athenian)
- George Sand
  - Elle et lui
  - L'Homme de neige
  - Jean de la Roche
  - Narcisse
- Harriet Beecher Stowe – The Minister's Wooing
- Leo Tolstoy – Family Happiness («Семейное счастье», Semeynoye Schast'ye; published in Russkiy vestnik)
- Ivan Turgenev – Home of the Gentry («Дворянское гнездо», Dvorjanskoe gnezdo; published in Sovremennik, January)
- Harriet E. Wilson – Our Nig: Sketches from the Life of a Free Black

=== Children and young people ===
- R. M. Ballantyne – The World of Ice

=== Drama ===
- Dion Boucicault – The Octoroon
- Dinabandhu Mitra – Nil Darpan
- Alexander Ostrovsky – The Storm («Гроза»)
- Watts Phillips – The Dead Heart
- Aleksey Pisemsky – A Bitter Fate («Горькая судьбина», Gorkaya sudbina)

=== Poetry ===
- Edward Fitzgerald – The Rubáiyát of Omar Khayyám
- Alfred Tennyson – Idylls of the King
- Victor Hugo – La Légende des siècles, first series

=== Non-fiction ===
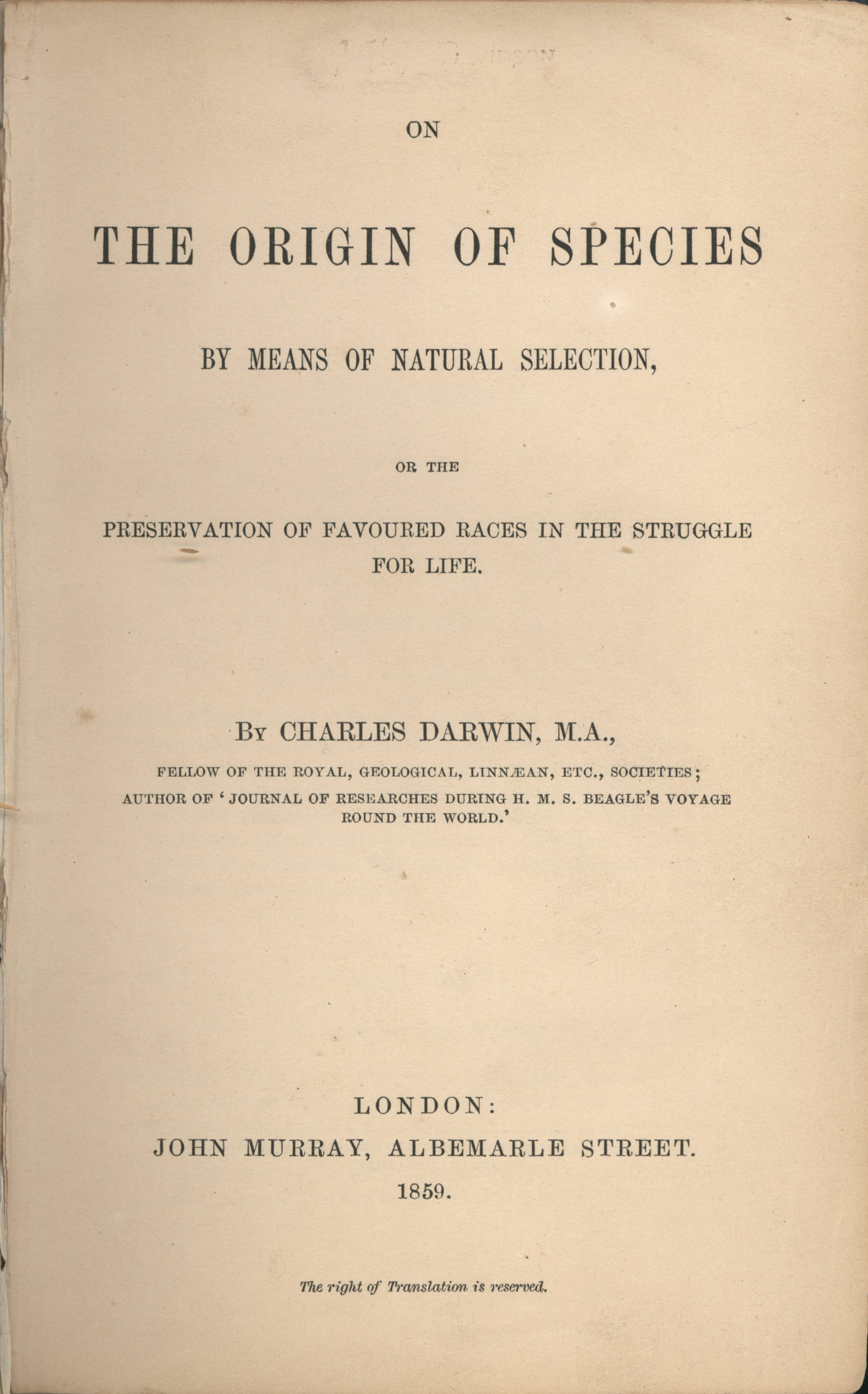
1st ed.

- Charles Darwin – On the Origin of Species
- William Henry Harvey – Phycologia Australica
- Washington Irving – The Life of George Washington, Volume 5
- Søren Kierkegaard (died 1855) – The Point of View of My Work as an Author (first full publication)
- Karl Marx – Preface to A Contribution to the Critique of Political Economy
- John Stuart Mill – On Liberty
- Samuel Smiles – Self-Help
- Robert Vaughan – Revolutions in English History (3 vols, completed 1863)

== Births ==
- January 29 – Ethel Hillyer Harris, American author (died 1931)
- March 8 – Kenneth Grahame, Scottish-born children's author (died 1932)
- March 16 – Jennie M. Bingham, American author (died 1933)
- March 26 – A. E. Housman, English poet (died 1936)
- May 1 – Alexandru Philippide, Romanian linguist and polemicist (died 1933)
- May 2 – Jerome K. Jerome, English humorous writer (died 1927)
- May 6 – Willem Kloos, Dutch poet and critic (died 1938)
- May 22
  - Arthur Conan Doyle, Scottish-born physician and prolific writer (died 1930)
  - Tsubouchi Shōyō (Tsubouchi Yūzō, 坪内 雄蔵), Japanese writer (died 1935)
- June 8 — Mary Cholmondeley, English writer (died 1925)
- June 10 — Jacques Perk, Dutch poet (died 1881)
- July 8 — Annie S. Swan, Scottish novelist (died 1943)
- July 13 — Marion Manville Pope, American poet and author of juvenile literature (died 1930)
- August 4 – Knut Hamsun, Norwegian Nobel Prize–winning author (died 1952)
- August 8 – Henry Gauthier-Villars, French writer (died 1931)
- September 6 – Frank H. Spearman, American writer (d. 1937)
- September 24 – S. R. Crockett, Scottish novelist (died 1914)
- September 26 – Irving Bacheller, American journalist and writer (died 1950)
- October 3 – Dumitru Theodor Neculuță, Romanian poet (died 1904)
- October 18 – Henri Bergson, French philosopher and winner of the 1927 Nobel Prize in Literature (died 1941)
- November 2 – Augusta Peaux, Dutch poet (died 1944)
- November 23 – Clara H. Hazelrigg, American author, educator and reformer (died 1937)
- December 5 – Sidney Lee (Solomon Lee), English biographer (died 1926)
- December 15 – L. L. Zamenhof, Russo-Polish initiator of Esperanto (died 1917)
- December 24 – Olive E. Dana, American author (died 1904)

== Deaths ==
- January 20 – Bettina von Arnim, German novelist (born 1785)
- January 21 – Henry Hallam, English historian (born 1777)
- January 28 – William H. Prescott, American historian (born 1796)
- February 13 – Eliza Acton, English cookery writer and poet (born 1799)
- February 27 – Thomas Kibble Hervey, Scottish-born poet and critic (born 1799)
- April 14 – Lady Morgan, Irish novelist (born c. 1781)
- April 16 – Alexis de Tocqueville, French historian and political author (tuberculosis, born 1805)
- April 29 – Dionysius Lardner, Irish scientific writer (born 1793)
- July 23 – Marceline Desbordes-Valmore, French poet (born 1786)
- September 2 – Delia Bacon, American playwright and Shakespeare scholar (born 1811)
- September 27 – Marițica Bibescu, Wallachian poet and literary patron (cancer, born 1815)
- October 4 – Karl Baedeker, German guidebook publisher (born 1801)
- November 7 – Auguste Hilarion, French politician and writer (born 1769)
- November 16 – William Spalding, Scottish writer and scholar (born 1809)
- November 20 – Mountstuart Elphinstone, Scottish historian (born 1779)
- November 28 – Washington Irving, American fiction writer, biographer and historian (born 1783)
- December 1 – John Austin, English legal philosopher (born 1790 in literature)
- December 8 – Thomas de Quincey, English essayist (born 1785)
- December 16 – Wilhelm Grimm, German collector of folk tales (born 1786)
- December 28 – Thomas Babington Macaulay, English-born poet, historian and politician (heart attack; born 1800)
