= James Yates murders =

1781 familicide in New York, U.S.

The James Yates murders occurred in 1781, when James Yates brutally murdered his wife and his four children in New York, later claiming that a voice instructed him to do so.

== History ==
In late December 1781 and in the first months of 1782, a few newspapers ran articles making reference to the James Yates Murders. Although most of these articles provided only a few lines, they serve as lasting evidence of the crime.

James Yates was born in West-Chester County. A source from The Pennsylvania Packet claimed to have spoken to various neighbors, all of whom described Yates as someone they would never have expected to commit such an atrocity. Before the incident, he had appeared as healthy and sane. Yates had been a member of the religious community, the Society of Shakers.

On the night of the murders, he "was tempted to this horrid deed by the spirit". This temptation resulted in the murder of his four children and his wife. Three out of the four children were murdered in the house, while his wife, with the youngest child on top of her, were found on the nearby road. Mrs. Yates was likely attempting to escape. Yates's weapon of choice was believed to be a club. Not only was a club found in the road alongside his wife and child, but his victims had wounds to the head. Many of Yates's animals were also killed, such as his cattle, a dog and two horses.

The following morning, Yates went to his parents' house, and his neighbors reported that he was nude. He disclosed to his parents what he had done, but they did not belive him until arriving at their son's home and discovering the bodies themselves. Yates was confused and seemed to be in a state of madness as he claimed at first that the bodies were not those of his family and felt that his now deceased wife was an Indian. He also professed that his actions were acceptable and appeared to have little regret. His brother was present that day and was able to control his brother, so Yates was not restrained. He was eventually imprisoned in Albany.

== An Account of a Murder Committed by Mr. J---- Y----, upon His Family ==
Little was published in the papers regarding the murder in the years following the tragedy. "An Account of a Murder Committed by Mr. J---- Y----, upon His Family, in December, A.D. 1781" was posted in the newspaper fifteen years after the murders. The authenticity to the story is often questioned due to the detailed information and suspicious time frame. The full account was presented in the New-York Weekly Magazine in two parts, the first on July 20 of 1796 and the second on July 27 of 1796. This account was written to the editor by someone named "ANNA", who states that she received the information from a woman that knew James Yates. Before relating a very detailed first-person narrative of the murders, the woman acknowledges that James Yates was not incredibly wealthy, yet his family was respected.

This account claims that on the night of the murders, the Yates family had some community members over for a religious get-together. His sister stayed longer than most guests that night. Yates was his usual self and was described as being particularly loving toward his wife. She had a desire to go to New Hampshire, so he intended to take her there the next morning. His sister then left, and Yates and his wife continued to read the Bible together. His wife held their infant, his oldest child sat nearby, and the two other children were asleep.

Yates saw a light, and a Spirit appeared that told him to rid himself of his idols. Yates began his night of destruction by throwing the Bible into the fire. Grabbing his axe, he went out to the family's sleigh and hacked it to ruins, only to do the same to the family's animals. The account claims that Yates once again heard the voice telling him, "You have more idols, look at your wife and children". He proceeded to his children's room and followed the voice's instructions by throwing his two sons against the wall and fireplace, resulting in their deaths. Noticing that his wife and remaining children had fled, he grabbed the axe and searched for them outdoors. He noticed his wife running in the direction of her parents' house, but he was able to hit her with the axe, causing her to drop their baby. The baby's life came to an end as Yates threw her against a fence.

His wife was injured and seeing her in agony caused Yates to come to his senses. He began to lovingly embrace his wife, but the voice haunted him once more. He grabbed a stake from the fence, repeatedly struck his wife and then placed the dead infant on top of her. Soon after, Yates found his last child in the barn, attempting to hide. He brought her over to where her mother and sister lay and instructed her to dance around the bodies as he debated killing her. He eventually took an axe to her forehead.

After ridding himself of the last of his idols, he reflected on his actions and realized that consequences such as prison or even death would follow. He pondered placing the bodies in the house, lighting his house on fire, and blaming Indians, but he decided against lying as he had a "good motive for [his] actions". Yates appeared at his sister's house early in the morning, and she took notice of the blood on his hands. He was in a crazed state and tried to grab a knife. She not only was able to resist him, but she tied him down and ran to her brother's house. The neighbors were informed of the situation, and Yates was taken to Tomhanick. A religious man, referred to as "Mr. W", attempted to counsel Yates while at Tomhanick, but he "[refused] to confess his error". Next, Yates stayed with a woman named "Mrs. B". He disclosed the events of that night to her but still felt that the directions from the Spirit were meant to be followed. Yates was eventually imprisoned at Albany. It is said that he escaped two times.

== Connection to Wieland ==
Charles Brockden Brown's gothic novel, Wieland, is believed to be based on the James Yates Murders. Theodore Wieland, like James Yates, heard voices advising him to murder his family. Within Wieland's Advertisement, Charles Brockden Brown declares, "most readers will probably recollect an authentic case, remarkably similar to that of Wieland". This statement appears to refer to the James Yates murders that, at the time, had been mentioned in publications such as New York Weekly Magazine, Philadelphia Minerva, and the Salem Gazette and served as a way to authenticate the story in Wieland.
