= Memoirs of Carwin the Biloquist =

Memoirs of Carwin, the Biloquist (1803–1805) is a story fragment written by Charles Brockden Brown and published over a period of two years in monthly installments of Brown's Literary Magazine. Brown never completed his story, and it has always remained unfinished, and unresolved. Carwin is technically the sequel to Brown's previous work, Wieland; or the Transformation, because Brown wrote it five years afterwards; however, the events in Carwin occur prior to the plot established in Wieland. Memoirs of Carwin, the Biloquist follows the life of a young man by the name of Carwin as he realizes his biloquial, or ventriloquist, talents. Carwin develops this ability to perfection, being able to manipulate his own voice to sound like any person he wants.

== Plot summary ==
Memoirs of Carwin, the Biloquist begins with Carwin as a young boy, about 14 years old, living on a farm with his father and brother in Pennsylvania. Carwin is different from his family because he wants to have an education, especially through the means of reading books. His father, however, discourages this and wishes for Carwin to have a simple agrarian life. In rebellion, Carwin continuously sneaks into the woods at night to read in the moonlight. During one of these escapes, Carwin is inspired to become a biloquist after hearing his echo. After several nights of practice, Carwin has the “power to impersonate” different people.

Soon after, Carwin discovers an aunt in Philadelphia who wishes to sponsor his education, but his father refuses to send him to her. To convince his father, Carwin decides to sneak into his bedroom at night, impersonate the voice of his dead mother, and have her tell father to let Carwin go to Philadelphia. This is the first time Carwin wants to use his voice talents to benefit himself, but before he can execute this plan, a barn on the farm lights ablaze, disrupting his father's sleep. After this event, the father decides to give Carwin permission to stay with his aunt.

In Philadelphia, Carwin receives a good education, but struggles after the death of his aunt. He is left alone, because his aunt left everything in her possession to a faithful servant. For a second time, Carwin decides to use his ventriloquism, this time scheming to imitate the voice of his dead aunt to convince the servant that he is the rightful heir. Again, however, he fails in his plan. At this time, a mysterious upper-class man named Ludloe decides to take Carwin into his tutelage. Carwin begins to idolize Ludloe for his gentry and his supreme education. Ludloe invites Carwin to travel to Europe with him, and Carwin, having nowhere else to go, willingly agrees. Throughout this relationship, Carwin never confides his biloquial abilities to Ludloe. Mysteriously enough, Carwin discovers that Ludloe is a member of a secret society, and immediately his curiosity is piqued. Carwin wants to know more about the society, but Ludloe agrees that in time, Carwin may join the society, in the meantime sending Carwin throughout Europe to increase his education. Additionally, Ludloe suggests marriage for Carwin as a step closer to entrance into the society. Mrs. Benington, a recent widow, is the suggested wife for Carwin, because with marriage he would acquire all her assets. After this, Ludloe claims that he will speak to Carwin about the secret society.

At the end of this story fragment, Ludloe requests to speak with Carwin. He demands Carwin tell him about his life with complete honesty, arguing that the only way to completely trust him is to know everything about him. Carwin decides to tell the truth; however, selectively leaving out his biloquial talents. After this conversation, Ludloe admits that he knows much about Carwin's past, especially regarding the mysterious murder of a woman in Toledo that Carwin was acquainted with. The story ends abruptly here with no conclusion. The reader only knows that Carwin's character reappears later in his life in Wieland; or The Transformation.

== Themes ==
Evert Jan van Leeuwen has argued that Memoirs of Carwin the Biloquist is anti-patriarchal.

Hsuan L. Hsu has argued that Memoirs of Carwin the Biloquist has undertones of democratic expansionism.

== Gothic style ==
Memoirs of Carwin the Biloquist is listed as a part of the Gothic literary tradition.

== Composition and Publishing History ==
Brown began his story in 1798, halted his writing, and continued again in 1803. From November 1803 until March 1805, Memoirs of Carwin, the Biloquist, or Carwin for short, was released in monthly installments in Brown's Literary Magazine. Brown never completed his story, and it has always remained unfinished, and unresolved.

Carwin is technically the sequel to Brown's previous work, Wieland; or the Transformation, because Brown wrote it five years afterwards; however, the events in Carwin occur prior to the plot established in Wieland. The common connection to the two novels is the character Carwin and his mysterious biloquial abilities. Carwin attempts to develop the history and background of Carwin prior to his appearance in Wieland as a way of clarifying some of the uncertainty that surrounds Carwin throughout Wieland.

== Reception ==
Critics have various opinions regarding the incomplete work, ranging from disappointment that such a great piece of work is left open ended, to Brown having deserted his work. A friend of Brown, William Dunlap claimed that Carwin helped to clear up the mystery left in Wieland and that readers "will regret that [Brown] did not finish a work so replete with novelty and interest". In opposition to this point of view, Carwin is often seen as unhelpful in that it failed to "untangle" any mystery, leaving absolutely no "closure and resolution" for those that read the story. Carwin seems to end so abruptly that it could not possibly provide any satisfaction, rather creates more confusion regarding the character of Carwin. The idea that he may or may not have been involved in a murder of a woman in Toledo only increases the amount of curiosity swirling around Carwin's past. This sudden and unexpected end can suggest that Brown "lost his first conception of his plot and motif" as well as his "enthusiasm", and he "gave up his struggle" as he "abandoned" his story in 1805. This idea of abandonment of the text is also interpreted as a loss of interest or that Brown stopped writing because "his responsibilities turned his attention to other duties". To give up one piece to do other things suggests a lack of interest or even a failure to feel as though it could ever be complete.
