= D. Narcisa de Villar =

1859 novel

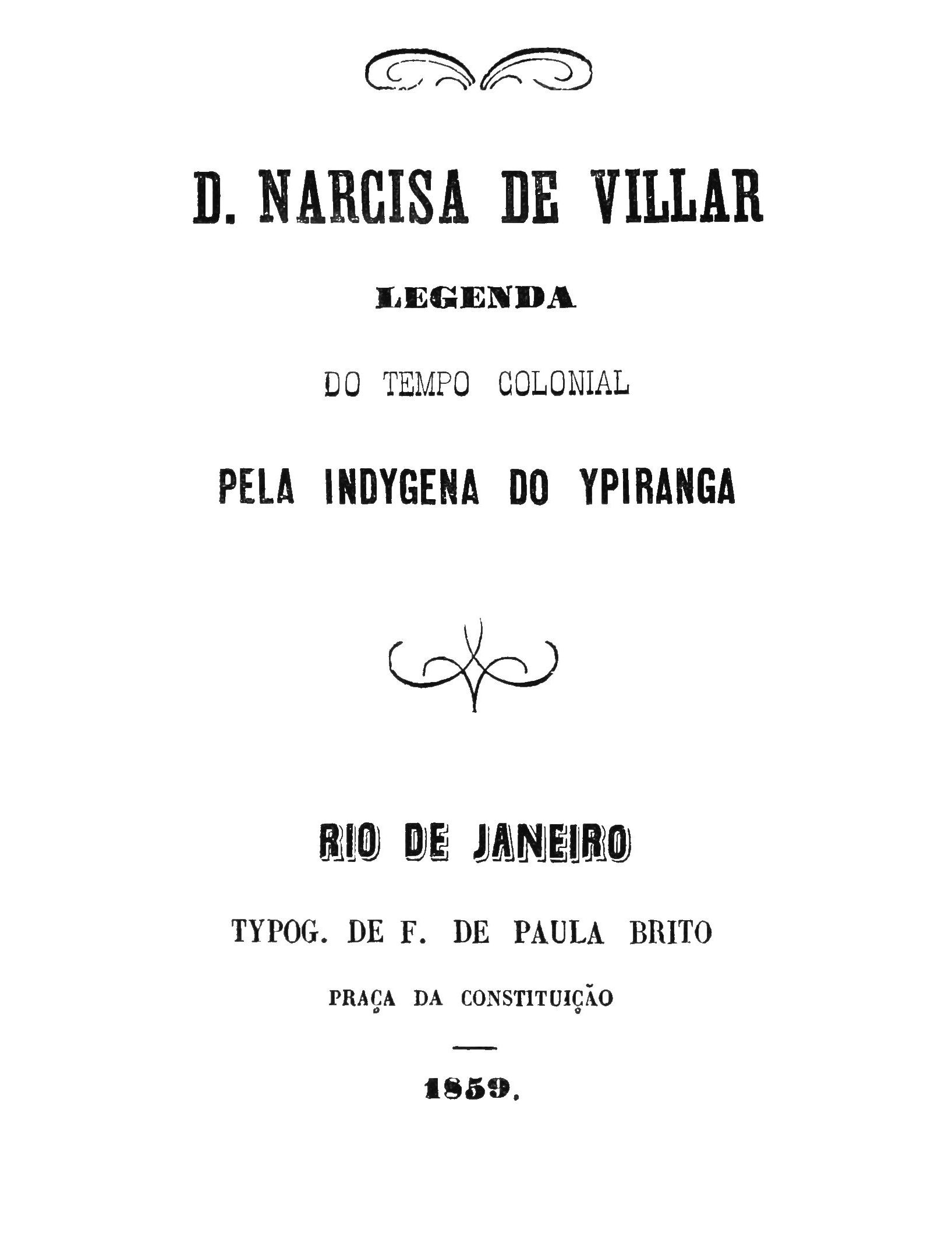
- Author: Ana Luísa de Azevedo Castro
- Language: Portuguese
- Genre: Indianist romance
- Published: 1859
- Publisher: Tipografia de Francisco de Paula Brito
- Publication place: Brazil
- ISBN: 9788586501210 (5th edition)
- OCLC: 8106607279
- LC Class: PQ9697.A1 D6

D. Narcisa de Villar: Legenda do tempo colonial (Portuguese for 'Mrs. Narcisa de Villar: A Story of Colonial Times') is a novel by Ana Luísa de Azevedo Castro, first published as a book in 1859. Castro published it pseudonymously as Indígena do Ipiranga (Portuguese for 'Ipirangan Indigenous Person'). Before its release as a novel, the work was serialized in A marmota, a newspaper published in the state of Rio de Janeiro.

The novel concerns the star-crossed romance between a Portuguese girl and Indigenous boy in colonial Brazil. Matthews describes the work as Indianist; Andreta and Alós note, similarly, that the work evinces a preference for the Indigenous peoples in Brazil over conquistadors. De Alencar argues that it represents a precursor to modernism in Brazilian literature. Wasserman compares it to the French novels Paul et Virginie (1788) and Atala (1801), as well as to the works of Brazilian writer José de Alencar such as O Guarani (1857)—although she notes that, unlike O Guarani, D. Narcisa de Villar does not "complicate moral matters" by describing Indigenous people in negative terms or Portuguese colonialists in positive terms.

== Sources ==
- de Alencar, João Nilson P. (2008). "Entre o fóssil e o fluido na literatura do século XIX: D. Narcisa de Villar". Olhares e Trilhas (in Portuguese). 9 (9): 63–71.
- Andreta, Bárbara Loureiro; Alós, Anselmo Peres (15 June 2014). "A representação feminina em D. Narcisa de Villar, de Ana Luísa de Azevedo Castro". Confluenze (in Portuguese). 6: 99–110. doi:10.6092/ISSN.2036-0967/4445.
- Wasserman, Renata Ruth Mautner (2007). Central at the Margin: Five Brazilian Women Writers. Lewisburg, Pennsylvania: Bucknell University Press. ISBN 978-0-8387-5872-4. OCLC 1148217438.
