= Clara Howard =

1801 novel by Charles Brockden Brown

- Author: Charles Brockden Brown
- Language: English
- Publication date: 1801

Clara Howard was the second-to-last novel published by Charles Brockden Brown. First published in 1801, the novel is both an epistolary novel and a novel of manners which diverges, alongside the novel Jane Talbot from earlier novels by Brown which were more intense and radical Gothic fiction.

Critic Paul Worthington calls these novels a natural progression of Brown's quest for a perfect novel form, despite their divergence in themes. While other critics where extremely negative about this change.

== Form and genre ==
The novel, as an epistolary novel, largely includes letters between Clara and her lover Philip. Critic Marin Samual Vilas, writing in 1904, noted that the epistolary form creates the greatest weaknesses of the novel.

== Themes ==
The novel focuses on how Clara's individuality becomes subsumed by social norms and expectations. In this context, "Love, like any other concern, must submit to reason", and even reason.

== Reception ==
Writing in 1904, critic and biographer Martin Samual Vilas called the novel "exceedly simple", full of "sickly sentamentalism", and evidence that "Experience in works of fiction did not add to Brown's ability in writing them."
