= Ormond; or, the Secret Witness =

1799 novel by Charles Brockden Brown

Ormond; Or, The Secret Witness is a 1799 political and social novel by American writer Charles Brockden Brown. The novel focuses on the ways in which individuals change in reaction to their social environments. The novel follows a female protagonist Constantia and her relationship with the mysterious Ormond. The novel thoroughly explores Republicanism in the United States and the republican values common to the early American nation.
