= Arthur Mervyn =

1799 novel by Charles Brockden Brown

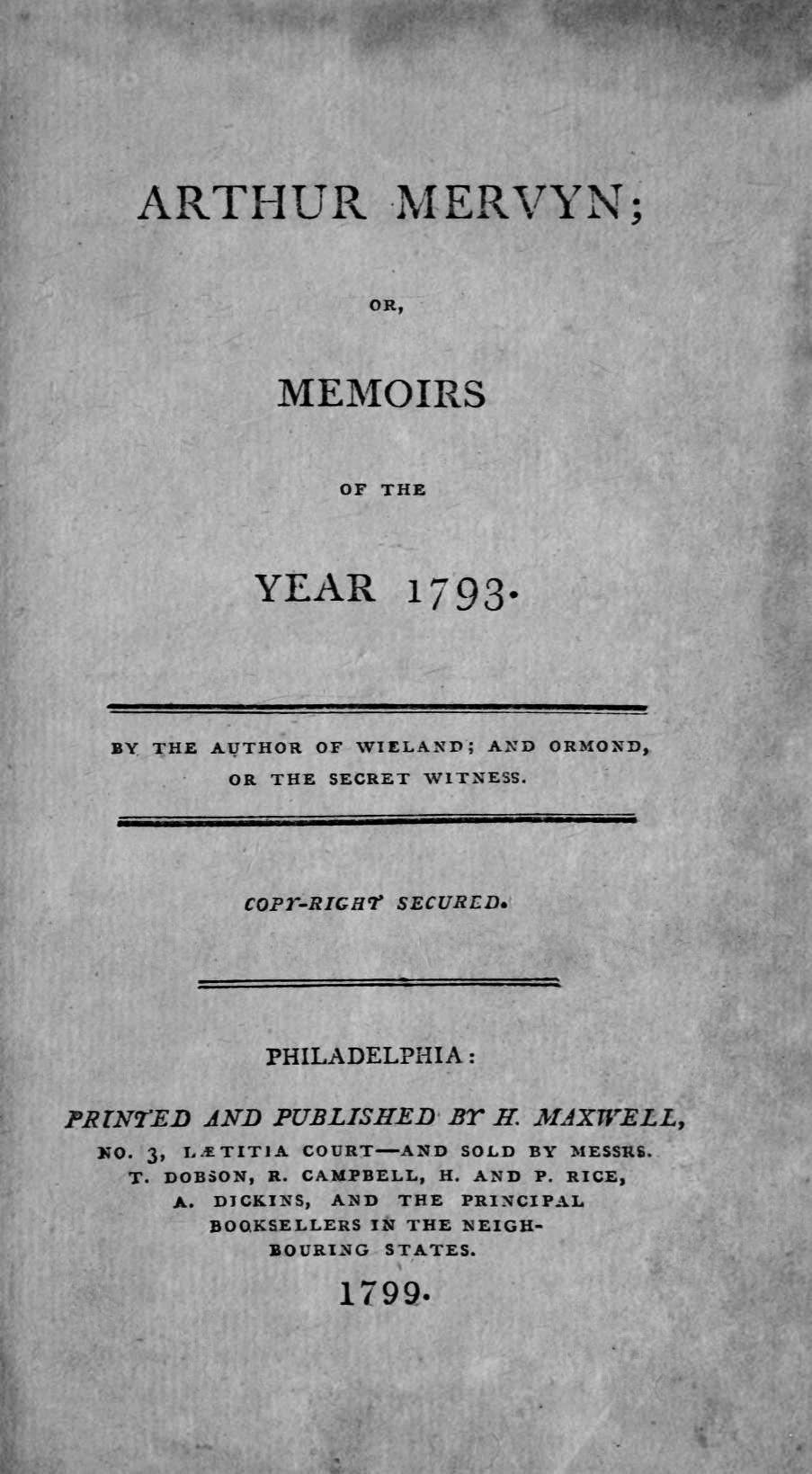
- First edition title page
- Author: Charles Brockden Brown
- Language: English
- Genre: Gothic novel
- Publisher: H. Maxwell & Co.
- Publication date: 1799
- Publication place: United States
- Media type: Print (Hardback)
- Pages: vi, 224 pp

Arthur Mervyn is a novel written by Charles Brockden Brown. Published in 1799, Arthur Mervyn, one of Brown's more popular novels, represents Brown's dark, gothic style and subject matter, and is recognized as one of the most influential works of American and Philadelphia Gothic literature. It started earlier as a serial in Philadelphia's Weekly Magazine of Original Essays, Fugitive Pieces, and Interesting Intelligence, but it was discontinued because the magazine's other writers were not keen on the feature and the editor of the magazine died from yellow fever. Hence, Brown decided to issue the book himself. The novel also includes the yellow fever epidemic in Philadelphia between August–October 1793 as an important plot element.

== Plot summary ==
Dr Stevens meets Arthur Mervyn, who has yellow fever, and invites Mervyn to stay with him until he recovers. Once Mervyn is better, Dr Stevens's friend Mr Wortley recognises Mervyn and reacts with displeasure. Mervyn begins to recount his history in an effort to clear his name in the eyes of Dr. Stevens. This takes up most of the book.

Mervyn was brought up on a farm in Philadelphia. His father married again and Mervyn did not get on with his stepmother, so left for the city. He loses his money on the way and starts begging in the city. He is locked in a dark room by someone he meets, Wallace, but escapes. He then meets Welbeck, a thief and a forger, who wants Mervyn to work for him, but Mervyn escapes and is helped by Susan Hadwin. In return, he helps Wallace whom he had met earlier and who is Susan's fiancé and has yellow fever. As a result, Mervyn is infected. This takes the story to the point where Mervyn is rescued by Dr Stevens.

After he gets better, Mervyn insists on returning to Susan Hadwin's farm to make sure everyone is safe. He doesn't return for weeks. Eventually he summons Dr Stevens to the debtors' prison to tend to Welbeck, who is ill there. Before Welbeck dies, he gives Mervyn about 40,000 pounds.

Following this, Mervyn tells Dr Stevens what happened at the Hadwin farm. On getting there, he discovered that almost everyone except Eliza and Susan has died of yellow fever. Susan dies the same day. Mervyn tries to house Eliza at a neighbor's farm, but the neighbor refuses. They almost die in freezing weather but are saved by Mr Curling, who takes Eliza in temporarily. Her uncle, Philip Hadwin, refuses to give Eliza her inheritance. At this point, Mervyn returns to the city to help Clemenza Lodi, whom he had met when she was pregnant by Welbeck. He finds her living with her dying baby in the house of Mrs Villars, a prostitute. He meets a young widow in the same house, Achsa Fielding, who had no idea her friends were prostitutes. Mrs Fielding is of Portuguese-Jewish-British heritage. She has been described as "the first American Jew to appear in American fiction".

Mervyn "rescues" Eliza from boredom by taking her to live with Mrs Fielding. He realizes that he is in love with Mrs Fielding, and stares up at her window at night. She is frightened but recognizes him. The next day they admit their feelings to each other and agree to marry. Mervyn becomes an apprentice to Dr. Stevens.

== Reception ==
The novel generally received mixed reviews. Some scholars have argued that Mervyn's character inhabits the grey area between hero and villain, or that he lacks "the force of will to be either". Emory Elliott, an American academic, describes the new edited novel as providing a "reliable text constructed within the intellectual, cultural, political, and religious context of a society". Many of Brown's works are related to revolution, but political revolution only makes up a small part of the novel, which focuses more on psychological development.

== Development ==
The sequel, Arthur Mervyn; or; Memoirs of the Year 1793. Second Part, was released in 1800 and is now very rare, with only a few collectors succeeding in obtaining both volumes. The novel has also influenced other American Gothic authors such as Edgar Allan Poe, in writing The Masque of the Red Death, published in 1842.
