= Confluenze =

- Discipline: Latin American studies
- Language: Italian, Portuguese, Spanish
- Edited by: Giovanni Gentile G. Marchetti; Roberto Vecchi

Publication details
- History: 2009-present
- Publisher: University of Bologna (Italy)
- Frequency: Biannual
- Open access: Yes
- License: Creative Commons Attribution 3.0 Unported License

Standard abbreviations
- ISO 4: Confluenze

Indexing
- ISSN: 2036-0967
- OCLC no.: 664621153

Links
- Journal homepage; Online access; Online archive

Confluenze - Rivista di studi iberomericani is a peer-reviewed open access academic journal established in 2009. It is published by the Department of Foreign Languages and Literatures (section of Iberian Studies) of the University of Bologna. It covers Ibero-American studies in the humanities and social sciences. The journal is published in Spanish, Italian and Portuguese, and it is diffused especially in Italy and Latin America.

In 2012, the journal acquired class A status in the evaluation lists published by the "National Agency for the Evaluation of Universities and Research Institutes".

It is maintained by AlmaDL, digital library of the University of Bologna.

== Abstracting and indexing ==
The journal is abstracted and indexed by LatinIndex and Modern Language Association, as well as other databases.
