= Alexander Wilcocks =

American lawyer

Alexander Wilcocks (1741—1801) was born in Philadelphia. He was a lawyer and a supporter the American Revolutionary War.

After his 1761 graduation from the College of Philadelphia (now the University of Pennsylvania) he became a lawyer. He married Mary, the daughter of Pennsylvania Chief Justice Benjamin Chew.

Wilcocks supported the American Revolution as a member of Philadelphia's committee of safety. After the Revolution, he served as recorder of Philadelphia from 1789 to 1791. Wilcocks was elected a member of the American Philosophical Society in 1768 and served as a University of Pennsylvania trustee from 1779 until his death in 1801. He is buried at Saint Peter's Episcopal Church, in Philadelphia.
