= Edgar Huntly =

1799 gothic novel by Charles Brockden Brown

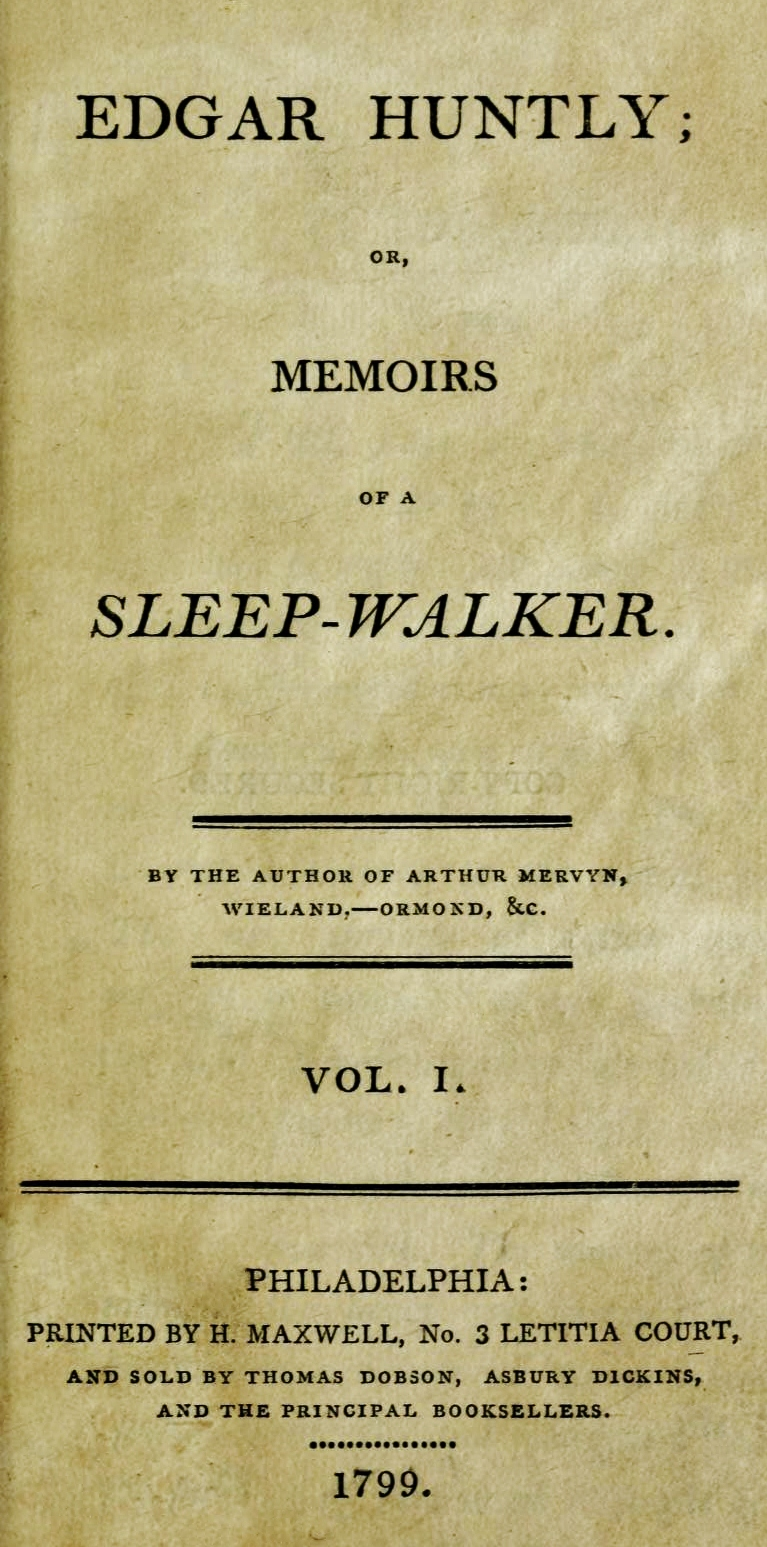
- First edition title page
- Author: Charles Brockden Brown
- Language: English
- Genre: Gothic novel
- Publisher: H. Maxwell
- Publication date: 1799
- Publication place: United States

Edgar Huntly, Or, Memoirs of a Sleepwalker is a 1799 Gothic novel set in rural Pennsylvania in 1787 by the American author Charles Brockden Brown. The novel was published by Hugh Maxwell. It is considered an example of early American gothic literature, with themes such as wilderness anxiety, the supernatural, darkness, and irrational thought and fear.

== Plot summary ==
In 1787, Edgar Huntly, a young man who lives with his uncle and sisters (his only remaining family) on a farm outside Philadelphia, is determined to learn who murdered his friend Waldegrave. Walking near the elm tree under which Waldegrave was killed late one night, Huntly sees Clithero, a servant from a neighboring farm, half-dressed, digging in the ground and weeping loudly. Huntly concludes that Clithero may be the murderer. He also concludes that Clithero is sleepwalking. Huntly decides to follow Clithero when he sleep walks. Clithero leads Huntly through rough countryside, but all this following doesn't lead to Huntly learning much about the murder. Eventually, Huntly confronts Clithero when they are both awake and demands that he confess. Clithero does confess, but not to Waldegrave's murder. Instead he tells a complicated story about his life in Ireland, where he believes he was responsible for the death of a woman who was his patron, after which he fled to Pennsylvania. Clithero claims to know nothing about Waldegrave's murder.

One night, soon after Huntly goes to sleep in his own bed, he wakes up in a completely dark place made of rock, which he eventually determines is a cave. He is hungry, thirsty, and feels as though he's been beaten. He is attacked by a panther, which he manages to kill and then drinks some of its blood and eats some of its flesh. Looking for his way out of the cave, he finds that some Lenni Lenape, an Indian tribe, are holding a white girl prisoner at the mouth of the cave. Edgar kills the guard and rescues the girl. In their flight, he kills more Indians, who seem to have begun a war. By the end of the novel, Edgar learns (among other things) that he himself has been sleepwalking, that Clithero was indeed not involved in Waldegrave's murder, that Waldegrave was murdered by a Lenni Lenape Indian, perhaps one he himself had killed, and that he and his fiancée are both destined to inherit nothing.

== Themes ==
=== Sleepwalking ===
In the novel, both Clithero and Huntly are sleepwalkers, although at the beginning of the book Huntly does not realize it. Sleepwalking is prevalent in the story, and Brown uses this device to drive the plot of the novel. For example, Huntly first notices Clithero while Clithero is sleepwalking near the Elm tree. This is what leads Huntly to investigate into Clithero's activities further, and why Huntly accuses Clithero of killing Waldegrave. It is while Huntly is following a sleep-walking Clithero that he first comes to the cave, which plays a major role in the plot. The entire second half of the novel revolves around the travelings of Huntly as he tries to return home; this occurs because Huntly wakes up in the bottom of a cave which he entered into by sleep-walking. Waldegrave's papers also mysteriously disappear, but later the reader learns that they were misplaced by Huntly during the night. Because Huntly was sleepwalking while he did this, he has no recollection of the events and the missing papers are therefore a great concern to him. At the end of the novel, Huntly no longer has troubles with sleepwalking.

=== Morality and truth ===
According to Scott Bradfield, "Brown's notion of truth is so deeply private, so radically democratic, it never firmly or fully establishes itself anywhere or in any one person. All people stand equal in their judgment of the truth, because no permanent, instantly accessible field of knowledge exists to which they can submit." This idea can be found in this novel, especially in Clithero and Huntly. In Clithero's tale, for example, he goes to kill his caretaker Mrs. Lorimer, because he killed her brother. In Clithero's mind, he reasons that Mrs. Lorimer would be better off dead then learning about the death of her brother, especially because she herself said that she could not live with the knowledge of his death. Clithero therefore thinks that what he is doing is an act of mercy instead of murder. When Huntly first hears this tale, he is moved by compassion and also twists his reasoning and logic to come to that conclusion. However, at the end of the novel, when Clithero goes out in search for Mrs. Lorimer again, Huntly realizes his mistake.

Huntly also has many moral dilemmas in this novel. In the last half of the novel, when he is called upon to kill Indians, he says that "My aversion to bloodshed was not to be subdued but by the direst necessity." Those dire circumstances occur, and soon Huntly has killed three Indians, to which he remarks, "Three beings, full of energy and heroism, endowed with minds strenuous and lofty, poured out their lives before me. I was the instrument of their destruction. This scene of carnage and blood was laid by me. To this havock and horror was I led by such rapid footsteps!" Huntly mourns the fact that he had to take human life, however, later in the book he learns that one of the Indians he had slain might have been responsible for killing Waldegrave, and this knowledge comforts his conscience. Huntly's justification of killing is similar to Rodion Romanovich Raskolnikov's justification in Crime and Punishment. They both see their actions as fulfilling a higher and more noble purpose. In this novel there seems to be no value for human life, especially Indian life.

=== The Gothic ===
In his preface, Brown claims that he will not use the same means as previous authors to create the Gothic feel. That is, he will not use "puerile superstition and exploded manners; Gothic castles and chimeras." However, as one continues to read through the book they soon find that Brown didn't completely live up to his promise. Brown creates the Gothic feel of the novel in order to create suspense. He does this through scenery and setting, mysterious characters, hidden secrets, and so forth. For example, the cave, which is a key element of the novel, is described as being completely dark. Not only that, but there are various paths within the cave that one can take, making the cave mysterious as well. Another example is the character Arthur Wiatte. His motives are to destroy and tear down. One might say he shows signs of having the Imp of the Perverse, which is when one does evil simply because it is evil.

Coincidence also occurs frequently. In one instance, Huntly is trying to open an enigmatic wooden box. While this would be impossible to most people, Huntly is able to open it because he just so happens to be a wooden box maker. Another time, the path in the cave that Huntly takes leads right up to where Clithero is hiding. Many of the characters that were in Clithero's tale also happened to be known by Huntly, for example, Sarsefield. Huntly barely escapes death multiple times. Once, a log bridging a large chasm allows Huntly to escape a panther, and falls just as the panther is crossing over, saving Huntly's life. Another time Huntly manages to somehow escape being shot at repeatedly by jumping into a nearby river. These instances add to the suspense of the novel, as well as its Gothic tone.

Edgar Huntly's Gothic devices nevertheless had an important influence on John Neal, who considered Brown his literary father. Brown's Americanized Gothic device of an ancient "haunted elm" was advanced in Neal's 1822 Gothic novel Logan (1822).

== Major characters ==
- Edgar Huntly--The protagonist of the story. His immediate family was killed by Indians when he was younger, and so now he currently lives with his uncle and two sisters on a farm outside of Philadelphia. He is betrothed to Mary Waldegrave. He is a wooden box-maker. He is also a sleep-walker, but does not realize it until later on in the novel.
- Waldegrave--Huntly's friend. He is dead at the beginning of the novel, and the plot begins with an attempt to find his murderer. He had many philosophical ponderings, which he often wrote down. The papers are now in the possession of Huntly. At the end of the novel the reader learns that it was an Indian that killed Waldegrave.
- Mary Waldegrave--She is Waldegrave's sister. The majority of the novel is a long letter written by Huntly to Mary. After the passing of Waldegrave, Mary inherits his belongings and money.
- Weymouth--He is friends with Waldegrave. He appears once in the novel to inform Huntly that according to Waldegrave, Waldegrave's inheritance was to go to him (Weymouth.)
- Clithero--A sleep-walker. He is also a tortured soul, due to the fact that he killed his care-taker's brother and then tried to kill his care-taker. Huntly at first blames him for the death of Waldegrave, but later changes his mind. After relating the story of his past to Huntly, Clithero runs off to live in the wilderness. He is later found by Huntly, who gives him food, and manages to survive the forest. At the end of the novel, after hearing that his care-taker is alive, flees to New York to go after her. His full name is Clithero Edny.
- Mrs. Lorimer--Clithero's care-taker. She is described as a very charitable person. Because of her love for her brother, she claims that if he were to die she would as well. Upon hearing about the death of her brother, she faints, causing Clithero to believe she is dead. Her first name is Euphemia.
- Arthur Wiatte--Mrs. Lorimer's brother. An evil character. He is killed in an alley by Clithero while attempting to rob him.
- Sarsefield--Mrs. Lorimer's lover. He is thought to be dead for a time until he makes an amazing reappearance, and soon befriends Clithero. He spends time in America, and even meets and becomes friends with Huntly there. After the Indian attack, he meets and talks with Huntly, explaining the specific details of the Indian attacks and reveals that Huntly sleepwalks. At the end of the novel he has married Mrs. Lorimer.
