= Charles Brockden Brown =

American novelist, historian and editor

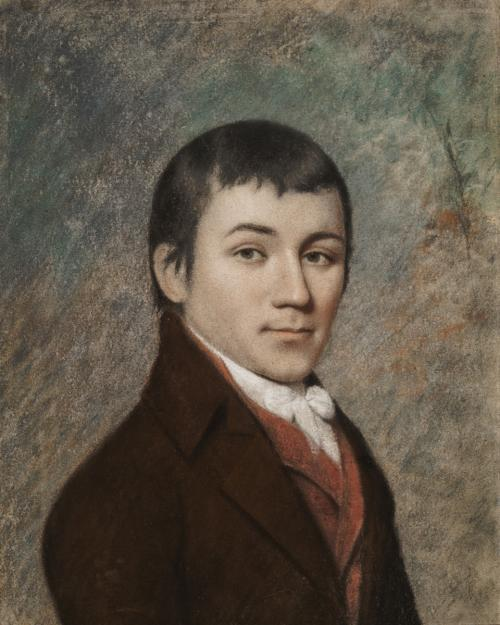
- Portrait by James Sharples (c. 1798)
- Born: January 17, 1771; Philadelphia, Province of Pennsylvania, British America
- Died: February 22, 1810 (aged 39); Philadelphia, Pennsylvania, U.S.
- Occupations: Novelist; historian; editor
- Writing career
- Genre: Gothic fiction
- Notable works: Wieland (1798); Edgar Huntly (1799); Arthur Mervyn (1799)

Signature
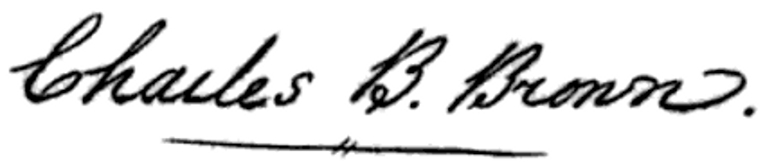

Charles Brockden Brown (January 17, 1771 – February 22, 1810) was an American novelist, historian, and editor of the Early National period.

Brown is regarded by some scholars as the most important American novelist before James Fenimore Cooper. Although Brown was not the first American novelist, as some early criticism claimed, the breadth and complexity of his achievement as a writer in multiple genres (novels, short stories, essays and periodical writings, poetry, historiography, and reviews) makes him a crucial figure in literature of the early republic. His best-known works include Wieland and Edgar Huntly, both of which display his characteristic interest in Gothic themes. He has been referred to as the "Father of the American Novel."

== Biography ==
=== Early life ===
Brown was born on January 17, 1771, the fourth of five brothers and six surviving siblings in a Philadelphia Quaker merchant family. His father Elijah Brown, originally from Chester County, Pennsylvania, just southwest of Philadelphia, had a variable career primarily as a land-conveyancer or real estate agent. The two oldest brothers, Joseph and James, and youngest brother Elijah, Jr., were import-export merchants and bought shares in re-export ventures as early as the 1780s. Brown became a reluctant partner of their short-lived family firm, James Brown & Co., from late 1800 to the firm's dissolution in 1806. The third brother, Armitt, was a clerk in the early 1790s for the Treasury Department and at the Bank of Pennsylvania (for a time Armitt was a clerk with Alexander Hamilton), and later participated in the brothers' import-export firm. The family's mercantile background and experiences in the global trade and trade conflicts of the Revolutionary era are relevant to Brown's writings insofar as he often explored issues connected to the period's culture of commerce and the role that commerce plays in the historical transition from 18th-century civic republicanism to 19th-century laissez-faire liberalism and capitalism.

Brown's family intended for him to become a lawyer. After six years in Philadelphia at the law office of Alexander Wilcocks, he ended his law studies in 1793. He became one of a group of young, New York-based intellectuals who helped begin his literary career. The New York group included a number of young male professionals who called themselves the Friendly Club (including Dr. Elihu Hubbard Smith, Brown's closest friend during this period, and William Dunlap), along with female friends and relatives who were interested in companionship and cultural-political conversation.

During most of the 1790s, Brown developed his literary ambitions in projects that often remained incomplete (for example the so-called "Henrietta Letters," transcribed in the Clark biography) and frequently used his correspondence with friends as a laboratory for narrative experiments. His first publications appeared during the late 1780s (e.g. "The Rhapsodist" essay series from 1789), but he published little during this period. By 1798, however, these formative years gave way to a period of novel-writing during which Brown published his best known work. These novels and the rest of Brown's career were informed by the progressive ideas he used and developed from the period's British radical-democratic writers, most notably Mary Wollstonecraft, William Godwin, Thomas Holcroft, and Robert Bage. Brown was influenced by these writers and in turn exerted an influence on them and their younger students, for example, in Godwin's later novels, or in the work of Percy Bysshe Shelley and Mary Shelley, who reread Brown as she wrote her novels Frankenstein; or, The Modern Prometheus (1818) and The Last Man (1826). The former was, according to his friend Peacock, heavily influenced in ‘the formation of his character’ from the depicted characters in Brown's novels.

=== Novels ===
Between 1798 and late 1801, Brown published the Wollstonecraftian-feminist dialog Alcuin (1798) and seven subsequent novels. An additional novel was written, but was lost by a series of mishaps and never saw publication.

In addition to his novels, Brown also worked as an editor. Along with his friends in New York, he published and wrote many short articles and reviews for The Monthly Magazine and American Review from April 1799 to December 1800, as well as its short-lived successor, The American Review and Literary Journal (1801–1802). Finally, besides these two New York periodicals, Brown also published numerous pieces of fiction, including the only surviving fragment of his first novel Sky-Walk, in the Philadelphia-based Weekly Magazine of Original Essays, Fugitive Pieces, and Interesting Intelligence (1798–1799).

Brown's novels are often characterized simply as Gothic fiction, although the model he develops is far from the Gothic romance mode of writers such as Ann Radcliffe. Brown's novels combine several Revolutionary-era fiction subgenres with other types of late-Enlightenment scientific and medical knowledge. Most notably, they develop the British radical-democratic models of Wollstonecraft, Godwin, and Holcroft and combine these with elements of German "Schauerromantik" Gothic from Friedrich Schiller, the enlightened sentimental fictions of Jean-Jacques Rousseau or Laurence Sterne, women's domestic novels by writers such as Fanny Burney or Hannah Webster Foster, and other genres such as the captivity narrative. Brown builds plots around particular motifs such as sleepwalking and religious mania, drawing on Enlightenment-era medical writings by people such as Erasmus Darwin.

Of the seven novels extant, the first four to be published in book form (Wieland, Ormond, Edgar Huntly, and Arthur Mervyn) have received the lion's share of commentary and attention. Because of their sensational violence, dramatic intensity, and intellectual complexity, these four novels are often referred to as the "Gothic" or "Godwinian" novels. Stephen Calvert, which appeared only in serialized form and in the posthumous 1815 biography, remained little-read until the end of the 20th century, but is notable as the first U.S. novel to thematize same-sex sexuality. Clara Howard and Jane Talbot have been regarded sometimes as relatively conventional works distinct from the earlier novels because they have classic epistolary form and concern domestic issues that seem very different from the violence and sensationalism of the first four novels. Recent scholarship (since the 1980s), however, has largely revised this view and emphasizes the continuities and overall coherence of all seven novels understood as a loosely unified ensemble.

=== Later life and writings ===
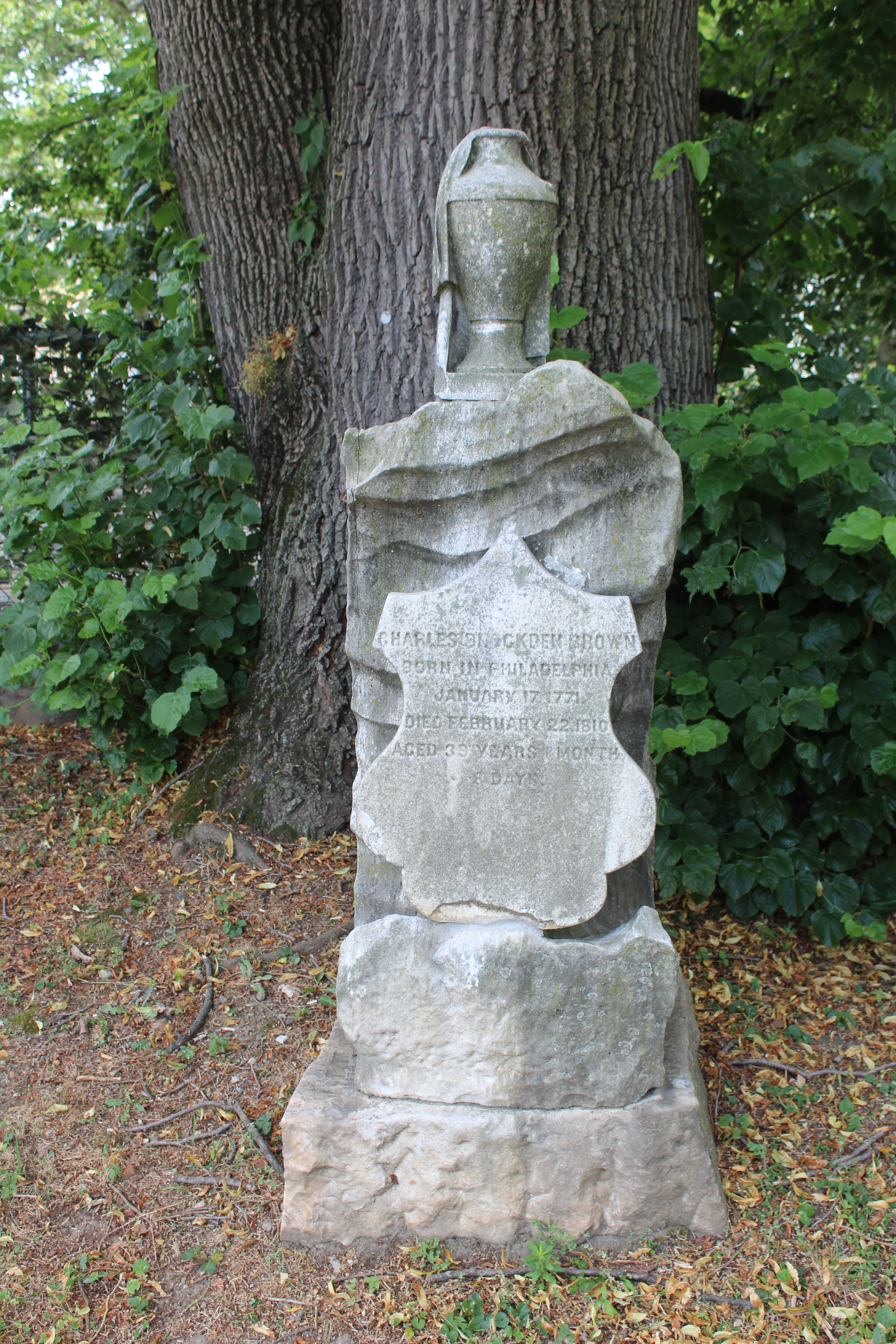
Charles Brockden Brown cenotaph in Laurel Hill Cemetery

After 1801 Brown continued to publish prolifically. He authored several important political pamphlets arguing for the acquisition of the Louisiana Territory and against the Embargo Act of 1807. He edited and was primary contributor to two more magazines: The Literary Magazine and American Register (1803–1806), a miscellany on cultural and other topics (from geography and medicine to history and aesthetics) and The American Register and General Repository of History, Politics, and Science (1807–09). The latter is notable for the book-length "Annals of Europe and America," Brown's contemporary historical narrative of Napoleonic geopolitics. Brown continued to write fiction and experiment with other literary genres during this period, notably in the Historical Sketches, a group of historical fictions that were written between 1803 and 1807 but published only posthumously. These late experimental narratives show Brown exploring the interface of fiction and history at the end of the Revolutionary era, at a moment that both follows the great Enlightenment historians (e.g., David Hume, William Robertson, Edward Gibbon) and prefigures the emergence of the 19th-century historical romance form in writers like Walter Scott or James Fenimore Cooper. He also published miscellaneous pieces in other Philadelphia newspapers and magazines of the 19th century including the Aurora and, in 1809, the Port-Folio.

In addition to these pamphlets, magazines, and historical narratives, it is notable that Brown maintained his contacts with reformist and progressive individuals and institutions in 19th-century Philadelphia. Although it was never completed, Brown planned from 1803 to 1806, with close friend Thomas Pym Cope, to publish a "History of Slavery" using the records of the Pennsylvania Abolition Society. Benjamin Rush recommended Brown in 1803 as an ideal author for a history of penal reform in Philadelphia. Brown maintained a well-informed interest in these sorts of reformist institutions and since the early 1790s had regularly visited new, pioneering hospitals and prisons (such as Philadelphia's Walnut Street Prison or Pennsylvania Hospital) with friends from his New York circle. In addition, he contracted to publish a major introduction to geography during his last years, but the manuscript is now lost. Politically, Brown has been an enigma, but more recent scholarship considers Brown as having, for instance, few or no associations with a Federalist political agenda and instead divorcing himself from the ideology of America as an exemplary nation, and desiring "political justice" on both sides of the Atlantic.

Brown died of tuberculosis in Philadelphia on February 22, 1810, at the age of 39. He was interred at the Arch Street Friends Meeting House Burial Ground in Philadelphia. A cenotaph was placed in his honor at Laurel Hill Cemetery in Philadelphia.

== Reception history and critical reputation ==
Although Brown's writings did not achieve immediate commercial success, he was republished in both the U.S. and England throughout the Romantic era and developed a widespread and influential reputation as a "writer's writer." New editions of his works were published and reviewed widely in North America and England during the 1820s, for example, when Brown's novels were also published in combined editions with those of Schiller and Mary Shelley. His novels were the first American novels translated into other European languages: Ormond was published in German (where it was attributed to Godwin) in 1803, and a French version of Wieland appeared in 1808. An abridged version of William Dunlap's posthumous 1815 biography of him was also reprinted in England in 1822. The most important group of writers influenced by Brown during this period was the Godwin-Shelley circle mentioned above, but Brown was read and recommended by many other major British writers of this era, notably William Hazlitt, Thomas Love Peacock, John Keats, and Walter Scott. Among American writers, John Neal, Margaret Fuller, Edgar Allan Poe, Nathaniel Hawthorne, Henry Wadsworth Longfellow, and John Greenleaf Whittier were notable in regarding Brown as a particularly influential and significant predecessor. Neal in American Writers (1824–1825) contended that only Brown, himself, and James Kirke Paulding, had written anything that could be called authentically American literature. Philadelphia novelist and journalist George Lippard included a dedication to Brown in his 1845 bestseller The Quaker City, or The Monks of Monk Hall.

The contemporary era of interest in Brown begins with the publication of a modern scholarly edition of Brown's novels, the six-volume Kent State "Bicentennial Edition" that was organized by Sydney J. Krause and S. W. Reid and appeared from 1977 to 1987. During the same period, new but still incomplete attempts to publish a selection of non-novelistic writings were initiated by German scholar Alfred Weber. Since the 1980s, new scholarship on both Brown and the early national period, accompanied by new mass market editions of Brown's novels and increasing efforts to understand Brown's entire career, has transformed the understanding of Brown's writing and its place in American cultural history. Brown was regarded as a somewhat secondary novelist by scholars in the Cold War era who focused on normative aesthetic criteria and tended to ignore the wide scope of his writings, and their referential impact, but more recent and historically oriented scholarship has established Brown as a leading writer and intellectual of the late Enlightenment and early Republic. At the beginning of the 21st century, Brown is widely acknowledged as a key figure in American literary history whose writings provide insight into the major ideological, intellectual, and artistic struggles and transformations of the Atlantic revolutionary era, even if not as aesthetically rewarding as core works of the traditional American literary canon. Joyce Carol Oates calls Brown "the first American novelist of substance". A Charles Brockden Brown Society, founded in 2000, has regular conferences on the work of Brown and his contemporaries.

In 2009, The Library of America selected Brown's short story "Somnambulism: A Fragment" for inclusion in its two-century retrospective of American Fantastic Tales, edited by Peter Straub. The Library also published Wieland, Arthur Mervyn and Edgar Huntly as "Three Gothic Novels" in a separate volume (first published in 1998), edited by Sydney J. Krause. The Library also included Brown's poem, "Monody, On the death of Gen. George Washington", in its volume of American poetry of the seventeenth and eighteenth centuries.

The Charles Brockden Brown Electronic Archive and Scholarly Edition contains up-to-date scholarship on Brown's life and writing as does The Oxford Handbook of Charles Brockden Brown (2019).

== Brown's novels ==
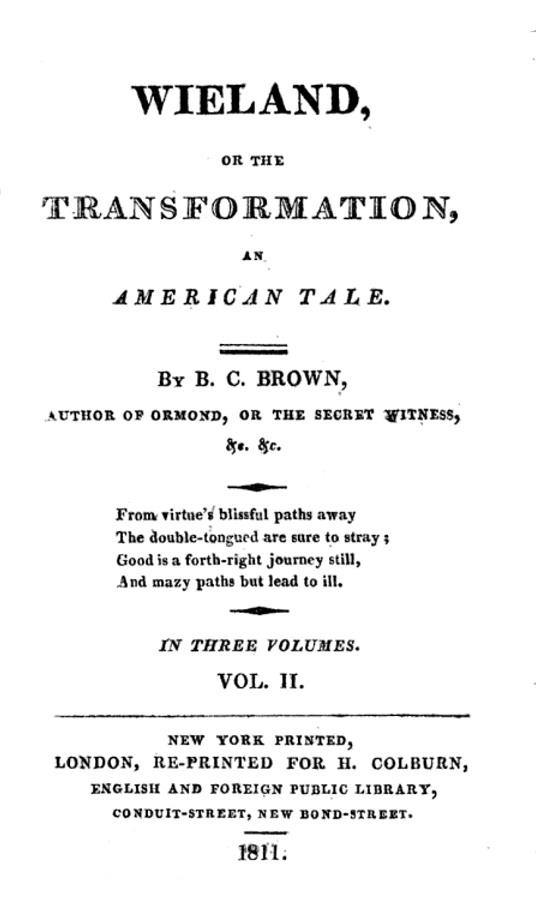
1811 reprint edition of Wieland; or, the Transformation

- Sky-Walk; or, The Man Unknown to Himself (completed by March 1798 and partially typeset, but subsequently lost and never published)
- Wieland; or, the Transformation (September 1798)
- Ormond; or, the Secret Witness (January 1799)
- a) Arthur Mervyn; or, Memoirs of the Year 1793 (May 1799)
- Edgar Huntly; or, Memoirs of a Sleep-Walker (August 1799)
- Memoirs of Stephen Calvert (serialized from June 1799 to June 1800)
- b) Arthur Mervyn; or, Memoirs of the Year 1793, Second Part (September 1800)
- Clara Howard; In a Series of Letters (June 1801)
- Jane Talbot; A Novel (December 1801)
- Memoirs of Carwin the Biloquist (1803-1805, unfinished)

== See also ==
- List of Minerva Press authors
- Minerva Press
