= Wieland (novel) =

1798 novel by Charles Brockden Brown

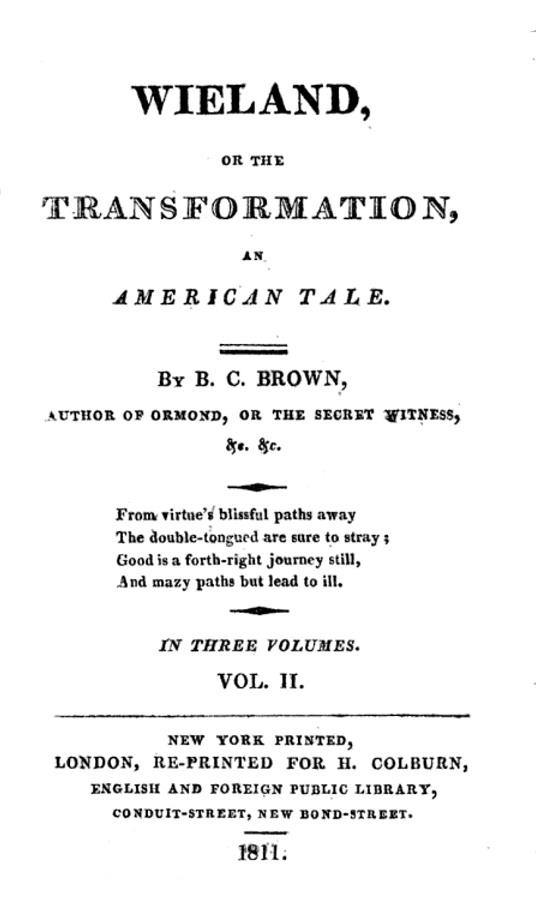
- 1811 reprint of Wieland
- Author: Charles Brockden Brown
- Language: English
- Genre: Gothic novel
- Publisher: H. Caritat
- Publication date: 1798
- Publication place: United States
- Media type: Print (hardback)
- Pages: 298

Wieland: or, The Transformation: An American Tale, usually simply called Wieland, is the first major work by Charles Brockden Brown. First published in 1798, it distinguishes the true beginning of his career as a writer. Wieland is sometimes considered the first American Gothic novel. Wieland is often categorized under several sub-genres including, but not limited to, gothic fiction, horror fiction, psychological fiction and epistolary fiction. Major themes include religious fanaticism, sensationalist psychology, and voice and perception.

== Main characters ==
- Clara Wieland is the narrator of the story, and the sister of Theodore Wieland. She is an intellectual, and has strong character. She is secretly in love with Henry Pleyel.
- Theodore Wieland hears voices of other people, and believes these voices tell him to kill his family.
- Catharine Wieland (née Pleyel) is Theodore's wife, and childhood friend of Clara.
- Henry Pleyel is Catharine's brother, and Clara's friend. He is extremely practical and continually attempts to understand the mysterious voices empirically.
- Carwin is a mysterious stranger who appears at the Wielands' house. He is a biloquist – able to speak in different voices – and the source of many of the disembodied voices heard by Theodore.

== Plot summary ==
Set sometime between the French and Indian War and the American Revolutionary War (1754–83), Wieland details the horrible events that befall Clara Wieland and her brother Theodore's family. Clara and Theodore's father was a German immigrant who founded his own religion; he came to America just before the American Revolution with the goal of evangelizing the indigenous people. When he fails at this task, he believes he has also failed his deity. One night, as he worships in his bare, secluded temple, he seems to spontaneously combust, after which his health rapidly deteriorates and he dies. His children inherit his property, which is divided equally between them. Theodore marries their childhood friend, Catharine Pleyel, and they have four children.

Clara and Theodore live in houses on adjoining property, leading lives of leisure in companionship with Catharine and her brother, Henry Pleyel. The story centers on several seemingly supernatural experiences that occur to members of the family. The first incident involves Theodore hearing a disembodied voice that warns him of potential danger. While the others are initially skeptical of his story, Henry and Clara have similar experiences soon afterward, which brings credibility to each of their stories. When the mysterious Carwin appears on the scene, he suggests that the voices may be caused by human mimicry.

Clara is secretly in love with Pleyel, and makes a plan to tell him so; however, her chance is ruined. When she returns home, she finds Carwin hiding in her closet. He admits he had been planning to rape Clara, but believing her to be under the protection of a supernatural force, leaves her.

The next morning, Pleyel accuses Clara of having an affair with Carwin. He leaves quickly, without giving Clara enough time to defend herself. She decides to go to see Pleyel, to tell him he is mistaken, but he does not seem to believe her. On her way home, Clara stops to visit her friend Mrs. Baynton, where Clara finds waiting for her a letter from Carwin, asking to see her.

At Theodore's house, Clara finds that everyone seems to be asleep, so she continues on to her own home, where she is to meet with Carwin. When she arrives, there are strange noises and lights, and she sees a glimpse of Carwin's face. In her room, she finds a strange letter from Carwin, and Catharine in her bed – dead. Shocked, she sits in her room until Theodore arrives and threatens Clara. When he hears voices outside, he leaves Clara unharmed. Clara learns that Theodore's children and Louisa Conway have also been killed.

Clara falls ill; later, she is able to read the murderer's testimony. The killer is her brother, Theodore. He claims to have been acting under divine orders. Clara is sure that Carwin is the source of Theodore's madness.

Carwin reveals to Clara that he is a biloquist. He was the cause of most of the voices, but he claims that he did not tell Theodore to commit the murders. Wieland, having escaped from prison, arrives at Clara's house and tries to kill her. Carwin uses his ability to tell Theodore to stop. He says that Theodore should not have listened to the voices, and Theodore suddenly comes to his senses. He kills himself, full of remorse for what he has done.

Clara refuses to leave her house, until it burns down one day. She then goes to Europe with her uncle, and eventually marries Pleyel. Clara feels she has finally recovered from the tragic events, enough to write them down. As for Carwin, he has become a farmer in the countryside.

== Major themes ==
=== Religious fanaticism ===
A theme of Wieland is the criticism of religious fanaticism. The religious fanaticism of both Theodore and his father demonstrates the subjectivity of the human experience. Even more, it suggests that "godliness can corrupt, and absolute godliness can corrupt absolutely." That the horrors that befall the Wieland family come from the direct result of religious enthusiasm indicates Brown's dislike for extreme religious sentiment. Indeed, it is often suggested that Wieland is an attack on Puritanism (though it is also often thought of as a historical allegory, or even one that explores the writing process itself).

=== Sensationalist psychology ===
Wieland calls into question the sensationalist psychology of the time. The plot is based on the psychological ideology of the time, which was solely based on sensory inputs. While the action is based on this kind of psychology, Brown did not necessarily accept the doctrine without criticism. In fact, he calls into question its validity: the characters are trying to find the truth that is disguised by appearance, and the action – especially Carwin's ventriloquism – shows how difficult it is to find truth simply through sensory evidence. What Brown is concerned with is how the mind can be corrupted by unaccountable and dark impulses.

=== Voice and perception ===
The ability of Carwin to divorce a voice from its body via ventriloquism, or "biloquism" (meaning double-speech) as it is referred to in the text, draws attention to the problem of over-reliance on the senses. There is a distinction between "liberating voice from the body" and the listener's "(mis)recognition of the voice’s originating body." The latter is what ventriloquism does in the text; a voice, in the character's minds, has to be imparted from a bodily source. If no source is apparent, they assign it one. Subjectivity is put into question.

For example, Clara is shunned by Pleyel when he believes he heard Clara and Carwin speaking at night in the summer home. When his other senses were deprived, he relied only on the incomplete information of his hearing. The otherwise rationalistic character mistook "prejudice, emotion, and false logic for reason" when faced with a choice between believing Clara's account or the disembodied voices.

== Reception ==
Many modern critics fault Wieland for its gimmickry, and late-eighteenth century critics scorned it as well. The use of spontaneous combustion especially has been pointed at as a contrived element. In Brown's time, critics harshly faulted Brown for using ventriloquism as the device that drove the plot of the novel. Critics today have also disdained the ventriloquism in Wieland. In Brown's time, critics considered the work to be unsophisticated because of its dependence on the conventions of Gothic novels and novels of seduction.

Despite its weaknesses, Wieland is thought to be one of the first significant novels published by an American, and it is most certainly Brown's most successful work. Joyce Carol Oates describes Wieland as "a nightmare expression of the fulfillment of repressed desire, anticipating Edgar Allan Poe's similarly claustrophobic tales of the grotesque." It was very influential in the later development of the Gothic genre by such writers as Edgar Allan Poe, Mary Shelley and, most especially, George Lippard. In particular, it provided an influence to Logan (1822) by John Neal, who considered Brown his literary father.

== In popular culture ==
A film adaptation of the novel was released in the United States on 5 February 2024, starring Emily Lapisardi as Clara Wieland and Christian Peterson as Theodore Wieland. It was directed by Cody Knotts and adapted to screenplay by both Lapisardi and Knotts. Other cast members include Mike Markoff as Carwin and Georgie Raiola as Henry Pleyel.

Wieland is the basis of Sara Silgar's novel Vantage Point. In this modern retelling, Clara is a young woman recovering from an acute eating disorder, while her brother, Teddy, is running for the United States Senate. The outside force haunting the main characters is deepfake technology, rather than otherworldly voices; after doctored videos of the Wielands engaging in sexual intercourse emerge online, Clara begins experiencing strange visions, while Teddy becomes increasingly cruel and paranoid as he attempts to contain the videos' political fallout.

== See also ==
- Memoirs of Carwin the Biloquist
