= American Gothic Tales =

1996 anthology of short fiction

First edition Cover art: Albert Pinkham Ryder, The Race Track (Death on a Pale Horse), c.1896 - c.1908

American Gothic Tales is an anthology of "gothic" American short fiction. Edited and with an Introduction by Joyce Carol Oates, it was published by Plume in 1996. It features contributions by Washington Irving, Nathaniel Hawthorne, Edgar Allan Poe, Stephen King, Anne Rice and others, and includes over 40 stories.

== Contents ==
- Introduction
- Charles Brockden Brown: Wieland; or, the Transformation
- Washington Irving: "The Legend of Sleepy Hollow"
- Nathaniel Hawthorne: "The Man of Adamant" and "Young Goodman Brown"
- Herman Melville: "The Tartarus of Maids"
- Edgar Allan Poe: "The Black Cat"
- Charlotte Perkins Gilman: "The Yellow Wallpaper"
- Henry James: "The Romance of Certain Old Clothes"
- Ambrose Bierce: "The Damned Thing"
- Edith Wharton: "Afterward"
- Gertrude Atherton: "The Striding Place"
- Sherwood Anderson: "Death in the Woods"
- H. P. Lovecraft: "The Outsider"
- William Faulkner: "A Rose for Emily"
- August Derleth: "The Lonesome Place"
- E. B. White: "The Door"
- Shirley Jackson: "The Lovely House"
- Paul Bowles: "Allal"
- Isaac Bashevis Singer: "The Reencounter"
- William Goyen: "In the Icebound Hothouse"
- John Cheever: "The Enormous Radio"
- Ray Bradbury: "The Veldt"
- W. S. Merwin: "The Dachau Shoe", "The Approved", "Spiders I Have Known", "Postcards from the Maginot Line"
- Sylvia Plath: "Johnny Panic and the Bible of Dreams"
- Robert Coover: "In Bed One Night"
- Ursula K. Le Guin: "Schrodinger's Cat"
- E. L. Doctorow: "The Waterworks"
- Harlan Ellison: "Shattered Like a Glass Goblin"
- Don DeLillo: "Human Moments in World War III"
- John L'Heureux: "The Anatomy of Desire"
- Raymond Carver: "Little Things"
- Joyce Carol Oates: "The Temple"
- Anne Rice: "Freniere"
- Peter Straub: "A Short Guide to the City"
- Steven Millhauser: "In the Penny Arcade"
- Stephen King: "The Reach"
- Charles R. Johnson: "Exchange Value"
- John Crowley: "Snow"
- Thomas Ligotti: "The Last Feast of Harlequin"
- Breece D'J Pancake: "Time and Again"
- Lisa Tuttle: "Replacements"
- Melissa Pritchard: "Spirit Seizures"
- Nancy Etchemendy: "Cat in Glass"
- Bruce McAllister: "The Girl Who Loved Animals"
- Kathe Koja and Barry N. Malzberg: "Ursus Triad, Later"
- Katherine Dunn: "The Nuclear Family: His Talk, Her Teeth"
- Nicholson Baker: "Subsoil"
