= The Anatomy of Desire =

- Short story by John L'Heureux
- Country: United States
- Language: English
- Genre: American Gothic

Publication
- Publication type: Collection
- Media type: print
- Publication date: 1981

"The Anatomy of Desire" is a short story by American writer John L'Heureux, first published in his book Desires, in 1981. It can also be read in American Gothic Tales edited by Joyce Carol Oates and Sudden Fiction edited by Robert Shapard. It is the story of a man with an unwavering need for more than just love: he wants to possess and be possessed. Determined to do so, he goes to an extreme only to learn there can only be desire: "He walked around on his skinned feet, leaving bloody footprints up and down the corridors, looking for someone to love him."

== Plot summary ==
The story of Hanley is told in third-person narrative. An event which forever changes his life is explained in detail. Hanley was the unfortunate soldier that had been caught by the enemy while sleeping. The general was very fond of Hanley when he was brought to him. He felt that Hanley could be his own son, but nevertheless, he still had to perform his duty. In the morning it was time for Hanley to be punished. He would serve as an example of what happened to infiltrators. The enemy proceeded in flaying Hanley's skin, sparing his face and genitals as the general had requested. His skin was then hung on the barbed wire and he was left for dead.

When morning arrived, the enemy had retreated and Hanley was rescued and then sent to the veteran's hospital. This was a lonely time for Hanley. No one wanted to be near him, except if they were obligated, because of his condition. Here Hanley met the nurse called the saint. She was a loving woman who when asked by Hanley if she would love him, agreed. Hanley eventually revealed he did not just want her to love him; he wanted to be possessed by her. The saint would tell Hanley how handsome he was, how much she needed him, and how she could not live without him. This went on for quite some time, but it was not enough for Hanley. "I am in love and I am loved, Why isn't this enough?" Hanley wanted to be surrounded by the saint; to be enclosed by her. That night they had sex, but it still was not enough for Hanley. During this time, Hanley was receiving letters from the general. He felt remorse for what he did to Hanley, but still explained he had to do his duty. In the final letter, the general revealed he could no longer endure it and that he was possessed by Hanley.

One day Hanley finally realized what he wanted and told the saint that he wanted her skin. The saint allowed him to do so only slightly shivering from the cold blade of the knife. Surprisingly, the saint felt satisfied about it. He spared her face and genitals as were his. After a week went by and the skin had dried, Hanley put on the skin. He walked the corridors and left no bloody trails. "Thank you" he told the saint, "It is my heart's desire fulfilled. I am inside you. I am possessed by you." When he looked into the saint's loving eyes, he finally realized what had occurred. He could never truly be possessed, he could only desire the feeling. "He plucked at his empty skin, and wept."
