= Time and Again =

Time and Again may refer to:

== Literature ==
- Time and Again (Finney novel), a novel by Jack Finney
- "Time and Again" (short story), a 1977 short story by Breece D'J Pancake
- Time and Again, a Korean series by JiUn Yun, serialized in Yen Plus
- Time and Again (Simak novel), a novel by Clifford D. Simak

== Other media ==
- Time and Again (TV series), an American retrospective series
- "Time and Again" (Star Trek: Voyager), an episode of the TV series Star Trek: Voyager
- "Time and Again" (Ms. Marvel), a 2022 episode of the TV series Ms. Marvel
- "Time and Again", a song by a-ha from Lifelines
- Time and Again (Kim Boyce album), 1988
- Time and Again (Mulgrew Miller album), 1991
- Time and Again (Eliane Elias album), 2024

== See also ==
- Time Again (disambiguation)
- Time and Time Again (disambiguation)
