= The 13 Most Terrifying Horror Stories =

List of horror stories

The 13 Most Terrifying Horror Stories by R.S. Hadji, is a list of horror (short) stories that was published in Rod Serling's The Twilight Zone Magazine in the July-August 1983 edition.

== The list ==
Number	Author	Title
1	Gertrude Atherton	“The Striding Place”
2	E. F. Benson	“Negotium Perambulans”
3	Algernon Blackwood	“The Willows”
4	Ray Bradbury	“The Jar”
5	Ramsey Campbell	“In the Bag”
6	F. Marion Crawford	“The Upper Berth”
7	Lafcadio Hearn	“Mujina”
8	Robert E. Howard	“Pigeons from Hell”
9	M.R. James	“The Ash Tree”
10	David Keller	“The Thing in the Cellar”
11	Henry Kuttner	“The Graveyard Rats”
12	H. P. Lovecraft	“The Haunter of the Dark”
13	H. Russell Wakefield	“The Frontier Guards”
