= Time and Time Again =

Time and Time Again may refer to:

== Music ==
- "Time and Time Again" (song), a 2002 single by Papa Roach
- Time and Time Again (album), a 2006 album by Paul Motian
- "Time and Time Again", a song by Chronic Future from the album Lines in My Face
- "Time and Time Again", a song by Counting Crows from the album August and Everything After
- "Time and Time Again", a song by Dusty Springfield from the album White Heat
- "Time and Time Again", a song by The Monkees from the album Missing Links
- "Time and Time Again", a song by The Smithereens from the album Especially for You
- "Time and Time Again", a song in the mod Portal Stories: Mel

== Other ==
- Time and Time Again, a 1994 novel by Dennis Danvers
- Time and Time Again, a 2014 novel by Ben Elton
- Time and Time Again, a 1953 novel by James Hilton
- "Time and Time Again", a short story by H. Beam Piper
- Time & Time Again, a 1984 role-playing game
- "Time and Time Again" (My Hero), a 2003 television episode

== See also ==
- Time and Again (disambiguation)
- Time Again (disambiguation)
