= Afterward =

Short story by Edith Wharton

"Afterward" is a short story by American writer Edith Wharton. It was first published in the 1910 edition of The Century Magazine. and later reprinted in her books The Collected Short Stories of Edith Wharton and Tales of Men and Ghosts (1910). It is an ironic ghost story involving greed and retribution where a ghost comes for one of the protagonists long after having been wronged in a business transaction.

== Summary ==
=== Part I ===
Mary, the narrator, recalls a conversation that she and her husband, Ned Boyne, had with their cousin Alida Stair six months earlier. The conversation centered on their search for a house in a southern or southwestern county in England. Alida suggested Lyng in Dorsetshire, after they had turned down several more suitable suggestions. Lyng is old, isolated, and in disrepair and they are attracted to it because of the “charm of having been for centuries a deep dim reservoir of life.” They only wanted the house if it was haunted. Legend has it that the inhabitants of Lyng do not know they have encountered the ghost until long afterward. Mary reflected on the legend with a new “perception of its significance” because of her husband's disappearance.

The Boynes were nouveau riche because of a business deal made by Ned and were looking for a place to pursue their dream of a life of leisure. They wanted to sit “in the thick December dusk, by just such a wide-hooded fireplace, under just such black oak rafters, with the sense that beyond the mullioned panes the downs were darkened to a deeper solitude.”

Mary recalls that her husband seemed withdrawn and worried earlier in the month but she did not question him about it and he did not reveal why he was upset. As she is reflecting on that day, she recalls an event two months prior, in October, where she had accidentally come across a hidden stairwell that led to a flat ledge on the roof. She remembers that she and Ned climbed the stairs to take in the view and that as they were reveling in the beautiful landscape, a stranger approached. Mary remembers noticing that Ned became perplexed and suddenly fled. At the time of the incident, Mary gave it no more thought because there were various tradesmen coming and going each day working on the house and Ned redirected Mary's concern with a trip to Meldon Steep. Now, however, she recalls the anxiety that was evident on Ned's face.

=== Part II ===
Mary recalls a day, earlier in December, where she noticed a figure coming up the walk. She thought it was the ghost but it turned out to be her husband (a bit of foreshadowing). She remembers being determined to find out what was bothering Ned and intentionally asking him while they were sitting in the library if he had seen the ghost yet. He replied that he had not. She remembers noticing a change in his demeanor as he opened his mail that evening. He seemed to be relieved of whatever burden he was carrying. She recalls feeling relieved at the change until she opened her mail. Someone sent her a newspaper clipping about the suit that a man named Elwell brought against Ned concerning the Blue Star Mine business deal. When Mary questioned Ned about it, he diffused her queries with “I thought that kind of thing bored you” and he told her the suit had been withdrawn, but he did not reveal why. Mary remembers feeling a stab of guilt at not taking an interest in her husband's business affairs.

=== Part III ===
She remembers waking up the next day, feeling refreshed at the change in Ned. She reasoned that she did not have to know about his affairs because she trusted him implicitly and decided to work on her garden. She recalls that a stranger approached and inquired about her husband so she directed him to the library to find Ned. She did not give the encounter much thought until later that day after she learns that Ned left with the stranger. She recalls feeling very uneasy with each passing hour because Ned did not return. She remembers going into the library to search for clues to his absence and finding a cryptic note that reads: “My dear Parvis, I have just received your letter announcing Elwell’s death, and while I suppose there is now no further risk of trouble, it might be safer –.“ Mary disregarded the note at the time but continued to search for clues. She remembers the dread she felt when she realized that Ned left with the stranger.

=== Part IV ===
Mary recalls the widespread search by the authorities for Ned. She remembers searching and finding the note to Parvis again and contacting him. He did not have any information to impart. Mary remembers feeling the gradual acceptance of her situation, she became “domesticated with the Horror, accepting its perpetual presence as one of the fixed conditions of life.” She remembers reasoning that “no one would ever know” what happened to Ned but that “the house knew." Mary recalls thinking that the house was “mute accomplice” in Ned's disappearance.

=== Part V ===
Mary recalls Parvis’ visit and his explanation of the events at the Blue Star Mine. She finally learns about the bad business deal that destroyed Elwell's life and puts the events together when she sees a picture of Elwell. The legend has come true and she realizes that the ghost of Lyng had appeared and taken Ned away.

== Analysis ==
The story is divided into five parts and is displayed as an exploration of the memories of the central character with several instances of foreshadowing. The dynamic plot starts at the end and bounces back and forth throughout time within a six-month period. An unnamed narrator in third person limited omniscience point of view tells the story. There are several conflicts throughout the story, both internal and external, which include: woman against self, woman against another, woman against society, man against self, man against another, man against society.

The setting is on old house named Lyng in Dorsetshire, England. The house is in disrepair and the location is remote. The narrator alludes to darkness and history throughout the story, which contributes to the dark and secretive atmosphere.

The focus of the narration is on the central character, Mary Boyne. She is happy to know nothing of her husband Ned's business affairs until he goes missing. Her mood transforms from happy to worried and then sad by the end of the story. Ned is a secretive businessman who earns his wealth in the U.S. and moves with his wife to England. His mood transforms from happy to forlorn in a matter of three months. The secrets that he keeps from Mary are his downfall.

There is irony in the story. The irony is that the couple brought the ghost with them. The ghost appears to the house's inhabitants but they do not realize it until long after the damage is done. The Boynes bought the house because of the ghost and the ghost took Ned away, in effect wrecking their idyllic life.

== Adaptations ==
“Afterward” is the fourth episode of the short film DVD series Shades of Darkness – Six Mysterious Tales of the Paranormal. The plot retells the story making Mary and Ned Boyne a young newlywed couple who buy a house in the south of England that is haunted and they regret it.

There is an audio book version of “Afterward” available on Librivox. Each chapter is read and recorded by volunteers across America.

The story has also been adapted for the radio and broadcast on BBC Radio 4 Extra.

== Sources ==
- Oates, Joyce Carol, American Gothic Tales, (Plume, December 1996)
- Lloyd-Smith, Alan, American Gothic Fiction, (Continuum, 2004)
