= In the Icebound Hothouse =

1985 short story by William Goyen

"In the Icebound Hothouse" is a short story by American writer William Goyen, originally published in 1985. It is included in the anthology American Gothic Tales edited by Joyce Carol Oates.

== Plot summary ==
The story features a poet who seems to be growing mad and nearing insanity. In detention, he is writing down the testimony that he has been unable or unwilling to give orally to the police. The story that emerges from his convoluted narration is that of his obsession with a hothouse situated on an unnamed university campus, encased in ice due to a cold snap. Day after day, the poet observed both the wonderfully lush hothouse and, in contrast, the drunken demeanor of the nurseryman. The poet requested admittance to the hothouse but was repeatedly denied, leading him to fantasize about vandalizing the place. On one of the poet's visits, a figure suddenly falls from the biology lab rising above the hothouse. It smashes through the frozen glass of the hothouse, and the resulting blast of air opens the door. The man goes in and finds a naked girl dead on the nursery floor. The nurseryman, after a few moments, jumps on the body and latches onto it in a frenzy. After a period of stupor, the poet approaches to find that the nurseryman is also dead. Inexplicably even to himself, the poet then grabs a gardening spade and stabs the nurseryman through the heart, although he then renounces to take the man's heart out of his chest. The poet is found sitting mutely by the dead nurseryman and girl, a sophomore at the university.
