= The Striding Place =

1896 short story by Gertrude Atherton

- Short story by Gertrude Atherton

Text available at Wikisource
- Original title: The Twins
- Country: United States
- Language: English

Publication
- Published in: The Speaker
- Media type: Print (magazine)
- Publication date: June 20th, 1896

"The Striding Place" is a short story by American writer Gertrude Atherton. The story was first published in The Speaker on June 20th, 1896 under the title "The Twins." After improving the story, Atherton renamed and republished it in The Bell in the Fog and Other Stories in 1905.

== Summary ==
The story is set on a night sometime in August, in West Riding of Yorkshire, England, in the woods and moors near the (possibly fictional) March Abbey. The exact time period is unclear, but it is likely set at some point close to when the story was written in the late nineteenth century. The main character is a man named Weigall who is searching for his close friend, Wyatt Gifford, who'd gone missing two nights prior during an otherwise mundane hunting trip. Weigall knows Gifford as an “incorrigible practical joker,” and is almost convinced that the man's disappearance is part of his latest prank. Nonetheless, Weigall is concerned for Gifford, and ends up searching the forest for him after the rest of his hunting party retired for the night.

While walking through the woods, Weigall recalls a philosophical conversation between himself and Gifford about the nature of souls and their connection to one's physical body, particularly after death. Eventually, he comes upon a section of the River Wharfe known as the Strid. Seeing this particularly deadly stretch of water disquiets him, and he resolves to leave, until he sees a hand reaching out for help from the river.

As Weigall struggles to pull the person out of the Strid’s currents, he realizes that it is Gifford he is attempting to rescue, and pulls with renewed determination until the man comes free, floating downriver to a still pool. When Weigall wades in, hoping to retrieve and revive his friend, he instead discovers that his body no longer has a face.

== Setting: the Strid ==
The eponymous striding place, the Strid, is a real part of the River Wharfe that has maintained a historically deadly reputation, though some stories of the deaths attributed to the river are unverified or folkloric. It is a narrow and very deep stretch that reaches depths of 65 meters in some places, with currents known for pulling people too far down to escape, drowning them quickly. The story alludes to the idea that people often fall in by attempting to jump across the river’s narrower sections, which is also reflected in William Wordsworth's 1815 poem, The Force of Prayer, and has carried through to modern coverage of the river. This popular idea comes partially from the Strid’s name itself, which is linked to “the possibility of striding across the channel” etymologically.

== Reception ==
The story was included in The Twilight Zone Magazine's list "The 13 Most Terrifying Horror Stories" by R. S. Hadji in 1983. It has 173 ratings on Goodreads, with an average of 2.90 out of 5 stars.

== Sources ==
- Oates, Joyce Carol American Gothic Tales New York City: Plume, 1996
