= Exchange Value =

- Short story by Charles R. Johnson
- Country: United States
- Language: English
- Genre: Horror

Publication
- Publication type: Collection
- Media type: Print
- Publication date: 1981

"Exchange Value" (1981) is a short story by American writer Charles R. Johnson. Set in Chicago, where Johnson himself lived for a time, this story addresses the corrupting power of money and wealth, and the problem of "hoarding", which is accumulating food, money, and other things for future use, as two brothers steal from a deceased woman, whose outward signs of poverty and begging belied her true nature: a rich, yet cheap, woman who hid her wealth away.

== Plot summary ==
Loftis and "Cooter" are two young brothers living in a Chicago apartment, who although do not generally take a part of criminal activity, set out to rob their next door neighbor Miss Elnora Bailey. Bailey, who only leaves her apartment at night to ask for food handouts, is a West Indian woman with all the appearances of a beggar. Having not seen Bailey for several days, and seeing her mailbox full, Loftis and Cooter assumed she had left the neighborhood, and would therefore be an easy mark for burglary.

Upon breaking into her house from her side window, the brothers first have to bypass several surprising booby traps: boxes of glass set beside the window. Entering Bailey's kitchen and apartment, the brothers are greeted by the smell of putrid garbage, roaches, dirty dishes, and aluminum coffee cans filled with fecal matter as Bailey's toilet had stopped working. Cooter feels disgusted at the setting, and stops when he smells an even more putrid stench; Loftis continues further into the apartment, and discovers, to the brother's surprise and excitement, a literal treasure hoard of money, stocks, alcohol, and more. In addition to the easily transported items like money was a nearly complete "Model A Ford," two pianos, multiple sections of a deceased tree, and trash.

Cooter immediately has misgivings about both the hoard, and the fact that he and his brother are about to take it, that there was something that just was not right. Loftis takes Cooter into Bailey's bedroom where they find Bailey dead and decaying in her bed, grotesquely being consumed by maggots and a single rat. Cooter faints, and Loftis drags him back to the living room, discovering a newspaper clipping beside Bailey's bed that shows the brothers how Bailey had earned her wealth. Working for an old rich family for over twenty years, Bailey had been willed their entire estate upon their death, and had been rich and wealthy for longer than both Cooter and Loftis had been alive.

Although Cooter still expresses misgivings about stealing the hoard of wealth from a woman who chose not to spend any of it, Loftis insists, and eventually they tote Bailey's goods back into their apartment. Totally in cash there was almost 900,000 dollars, in addition to bank books, and other odds and ends which the brothers could exchange for even more money. Cooter feels excited at the new future this property gives him and his brother, how they are set for life.

Cooter takes off and purchases a fine leather jacket and suit immediately, and explores the city in celebration as Loftis unusually stays home, appearing thoughtful. Upon returning home, Cooter is forced to enter through an unusual set of booby traps, much like the ones Bailey had set up in her apartment, and is beaten and scolded by Loftis for spending some of the money the two have stolen. Loftis additionally had taken trash into their apartment, and takes off for work, even though the two have stolen almost 900,000 dollars in cash. After Loftis leaves for work, Cooter watches as Miss Bailey’s death is discovered by their landlord, and watches as they depart with her corpse.

Loftis does not come home at the normal time he would from work, and actually does not come home for several days. As the days pass, the home of the brothers falls into similar disrepair that Bailey’s did, their toilet stops working, and they run out of their own food. With fear of discovery, they cannot call a repairman to fix the toilet, and Cooter fears using Bailey’s food, so he is forced to resort to begging, at the same place that Bailey had to beg for food. Finally, four days after Loftis left for work, he returns home, with a haunted look, stumbling into his bedroom. Walking after him, Cooter finds him asleep, his face haunted. Beside his bedstand Cooter finds a single penny wrapped in a newspaper with the words "Found while walking down Devon Avenue." Haunted, Cooter considers to himself that Loftis, and indirectly, himself, are mirroring Bailey’s actions before her death; so caught up by the possibilities of what their newfound wealth can bring, they refuse to spend it, not wanting to give up any of their newly found hope, their newly found future. However, by refusing to sacrifice any of the money to pursue that future, they sacrifice the "future" they have been craving and desiring.

== Sources ==
- American Gothic Tales. Edited by Joyce Carol Oates, New York: Plume, 1996
- American Gothic Fiction: An Introduction by Alan Lloyd Smith, Continuum, 2004
- Charles Johnson's Fiction by William R. Nash, University of Illinois Press, Chicago, 2003
