= Bruce McAllister =

American author

- McAllister at Worldcon 2026
- Born: 1946 (age 79–80); Baltimore, Maryland
- Occupation: Author
- Writing career
- Genres: Science fiction, poetry, non-fiction

Bruce McAllister (born 1946) is an American author of fantasy, science fiction, poetry, and non-fiction. He is known primarily for his short fiction. Over the years his short stories have been published in the major fantasy and science fiction magazines, theme anthologies, college readers, and "year's best" anthologies, including Best American Short Stories 2007, guest-edited by Stephen King.

== Biography ==
McAllister was born in Baltimore, Maryland in 1946. The son of a "peripatetic Navy family," his career-Navy-officer "Pearl-Harbor-survivor father and an underdog-championing anthropologist mother" raised Bruce and his younger brother, Jack, in Washington, D.C., Florida, California, and Italy. McAllister wrote, "The theme of the Outsider, the Other, the Alien in the larger sense, runs through almost all of my fiction. That came from being in a military family, from having a sense of being an outsider..."

He wrote to Dublin-based interviewer Bob Neilson, "When I was 4½ I shook hands with natty-dresser US President Harry Truman on a laid-back avenue in Key West, Florida. I had no idea who the guy was, but my momma raised me right. I wanted to be courteous, and he offered, so I shook his hand. ...[A] week after the hand-shake we dropped over to see Mrs. Hemingway, who lived in a little beach house with palms and banana trees and who, though we didn't know her, was hospitable."

He told Neilson that as a child he had a sea-shell collection of more than 2000 specimens. This interest appears in his fiction, notably in two 2010 stories, "Heart of Hearts" and "The Courtship of the Queen."

McAllister also told Neilson that "One of my ancestors was a guy named John Thomson. Immigrated from Scotland to Ireland, then the US in the 1700s. Wore his kilt till the day he died, outlived five wives, had fifteen children. Maybe the right stuff for a frontier, a New World, but I've always been horrified by the thought of having to live with someone like him. The domestic, family side of Braveheart?" The family story was that their lineage on his father's side went "back to Robert the Bruce, supposedly, and laterally to Ben Franklin, or so they said...along with a Captain McAllister of the Confederate Army." McAllister also thought that his mother "was probably part Native American."

Another influential childhood memory was this: "As far as our father's world went, we had, on the Navy base where we lived in San Diego, the bathyscaphe submersible in our back yard (literally we would have played on it if we could have gotten a decent grip); a year later it would make the deepest dive in the Pacific ever made, with Jacques Piccard and a Navy diver and a civilian scientist—all of them diving legends if not then, then later)." (Neilson commented in his essay about McAllister, "You can see where the themes of 'the alien' and 'the natural world'—the behavioral sciences and the biological sciences—came from in this guy's fiction.")

Literary archivist and agent Sarah Funke Butler describes an enterprise McAllister undertook when he was 16:

Bruce McAllister sent a four-question mimeographed survey to 150 well-known authors of literary, commercial, and science fiction. Did they consciously plant symbols in their work? he asked. Who noticed symbols appearing from their subconscious, and who saw them arrive in their text, unbidden, created in the minds of their readers? When this happened, did the authors mind? ... Confident, if not downright cocky, he thought the surveys could settle a conflict with his English teacher by proving that symbols weren't lying beneath the texts they read like buried treasure awaiting discovery.
His project involved substantial labor—this before the Internet, before e-mail—but was not impossible: many authors and their representatives were listed in the Twentieth-Century American Literature series found in the local library. More impressive is that seventy-five writers replied—most of them in earnest. Sixty-five of those responses survive (McAllister lost ten to "a kleptomaniacal friend"). Answers ranged from the secretarial blow-off to a thick packet of single-spaced typescript in reply.

When Butler interviewed McAllister decades later, he remarked, "The conclusion I came to was that nobody had asked them. New Criticism was about the scholars and the text; writers were cut out of the equation. Scholars would talk about symbolism in writing, but no one had asked the writers."

McAllister attended middle school and art school in Italy. He received degrees in English and writing from Claremont McKenna College and the University of California, Irvine.

He taught literature and writing at the University of Redlands in southern California for twenty-four years. There, he helped establish and direct the Creative Writing Program, directed both the Professional Writing track of that program and its Communications Internship program, received various teaching and service awards, and was Edith R. White Distinguished Professor of Literature and Writing from 1990 to 1995. Later, he started the company McAllister Coaching, helping writers of books and screenplays with their manuscripts.

He lives in Orange, California with his wife, choreographer and Orange Coast College teacher, Amelie Hunter. He has three children from a previous marriage: Annie, Ben, and Liz.

== Reception ==
Publishers Weekly wrote, "McAllister's first novel is a stunning tour de force... Masterful interior monologues that yield eerie, tingling tension make this terrifying novel one of the most memorable chronicles of the Vietnam war." Library Journal's reviewer said, "The training and the mission are suffused with madness, and the physical horrors are matched with mental ones. Throughout the narrative are interspersed transcripts of interviews, memos, etc. The apocalyptic ending does strain the willing suspension of disbelief. Still, the story is fascinating, very well told, and likely to appeal to readers of Vietnam War fiction and nonfiction."

In a review of The Year's Best Science Fiction Twenty-Fourth Annual Collection, Ernest Lilley described the famous story "Kin": "a twelve-year-old boy is in the act... his 'partner' is an alien assassin he tries to hire to stop the government from killing his unborn sister. There are a lot of interesting bits in this story, and some nice nuance in the actions and ideas. As Gardner points out in his intro, McAllister may not be prolific in his output, but what he does offer us [is] excellent work."

Bob Blough reviewed the short story "Blue Fire" for Tangent Online, the review magazine for short stories of science fiction and fantasy:

should be one of the most talked about stories of the year. It is flat-out brilliant. Bruce McAllister has created an entire alternate world in "Blue Fire." The alternate world is one in which vampires are real and fight against the Catholic Church for supremacy... The story takes place in the 1500s and the time of Pope Boniface XII – a child Pope elected at 8 years of age — who is about to die after 70 years of his reign as Pope, but who has one more story to tell. The story he relates is about a visit from "the youngest drinker" while he was still a child, but early in his time as Pope. The alternate universe is dazzling, but what sets this story above so many others is the true, honest, Christ-like character of the young Pope and how he deals with a boy who has been taken by the vampires. An excellent story with honest characters; it's a beautiful work.

SF Site reviewed the story "Heart of Hearts," "another of Bruce McAllister's ongoing series of fantasies about a teenaged American boy in an Italian village." Rich Horton wrote, "It's a bittersweet story, beautifully written, sensitively characterized."

Blough also reviewed "Stamps" for Tangent: "one of the very few SF stories I can think of which uses stamp collecting as an integral part of the story (Norstrilia by Cordwainer Smith is another one). But if anyone can pull it off it is Bruce McAllister. 'Stamps' is told in a minor key and concerns itself with aliens coming to Earth during the Cuban missile crisis in order to avert nuclear war. The narrator is T'Phu'Bleem, one of ten Arcturians on the planet to save and eventually reveal themselves to the world. He begins collecting postage stamps to understand these earthlings: "These stamps were like a puzzle, one that could explain how human beings actually thought and felt... If he didn't try to figure that puzzle out for the sake of the human race and the Ten Galactic Principles, who would?" It is a pleasant story that lingers in the mind as an unusual way of describing first contact."

After reading "The Messenger," Rena Hawkins wrote, "Tim's father is dying and the question that tears at him the most is whether his wife, Tim's mother, actually loved him. To answer his father's question and hopefully bring him some peace, Tim travels back in time to meet his parents and see for himself. A short, poignant story about whether you can ever be sure where love is concerned."

== Awards ==
- National Endowment for the Arts creative writing fellowship (for "Dream Baby") 1991
- Third Place, Very Short Fiction Contest, Glimmer Train, 2005 (“White Heron”)
- Finalist, Fall Story Contest, Narrative, 2015 (“The Painting of It)
- Finalist, Hugo Award 1988, Novelette Category, (“Dream Baby”)
- Finalist, Hugo Award 2007, Short Story Category (“Kin”)
- Nominee, Nebula Award 1987, Novelette Category (“Dream Baby”)
- Finalist, Shirley Jackson Award 2012, Novelette Category (“The Crying Child”)
- Honorable Mention, Fiction Open 2013, Glimmer Train (“Stealing God”)
- Honorable Mention, Very Short Fiction Contest 2015, Glimmer Train (“Beautiful Day”)

== Bibliography ==
=== Novels ===
- Humanity Prime (Ace Books, 1971; Wildside Press, 2008, ISBN 978-1-4344-0163-2) ("When Man's emerging star-empire met that of the savage Cromanths, the alien hordes began a war of extinction against humankind" —from Publisher's description) (Ace SF Special, Series 1)
- Dream Baby (Tor/St. Martin's, 1989, ISBN 0-312-93197-2) ("The acclaimed visionary chronicle of the nightmare that was Vietnam. Army nurse Mary Damico can see the future. She knows which soldiers will die on the battlefields. Col. John Bucannon, commander of the CIA's secret psychic warfare project, wants to exploit her dark gift, regardless of the apocalyptic carnage his experiment will unleash." —from Publisher's description)
- The Village Sang to the Sea: A Memoir of Magic (Aeon Press, Dublin, Ireland, 2013. ISBN 978-0953478-49-1) (“During the Cold War a 13-year-old American boy, Brad Lattimer, moves with his family to a fishing village in Northern Italy. It is no ordinary village. Brad is welcomed like a long-lost cousin. This village wants Brad to become something other than a boy—something that can never leave it—something it can have as its own forever.” –from the Publisher's description)

=== Short fiction ===
Collections

- The Girl Who Loved Animals and Other Stories (Golden Gryphon Press, 2007; ISBN 978-1-930846-49-4). “From his first professional story written when he was 16, "The Faces Outside," to his most critically acclaimed work, the novelette Dream Baby, a finalist for both the Hugo and Nebula awards, these 17 stories showcase the author's five decades of science fiction writing. The book also features story notes that reveal each story's origin as well as the influences-both literary and human-on the author's life and writing career.” –from Publisher’s description. Introduction by Harry Harrison; afterword by Barry N. Malzberg. McAllister included mini-essays for each story.

Anthologies edited

- McAllister, Bruce, ed. (1980). Their immortal hearts : three visions of time. West Coast Poetry Review.
  - "Cold War orphans" by Michael Bishop
  - "Le croix (The cross)" by Barry N. Malzberg
  - "Their immortal hearts" by Bruce McAllister

Stories

- McAllister, Bruce (October 2015). "My father's crab". Analog Science Fiction and Fact. 135 (10): 64–69.
- "The Faces Outside" (1963) - McAllister's first short story, published when he was a sixteen-year-old San Diego high school student, was originally published in the magazine If, July 1963, having been selected by Frederik Pohl. His debut story impressed many; it was selected for The 9th Annual of the Year's Best SF, 1964, by Judith Merril, and Isaac Asimov Presents The Great SF Stories 25 (1963), edited by Isaac Asimov and Martin H. Greenberg (ISBN 0-88677-518-3).
- "And So Say All of Us" (1969) - originally published in If, September 1969. Subsequently, chosen for World's Best Science Fiction: 1970, ed. Terry Carr, Donald A. Wollheim, ISBN 0-575-00590-4.
- "World of the Wars" (1971) - originally published in Mars, We Love You: Tales of Mars, Men and Martians, ed. Jane Hipolito, Willis E. McNelly, ISBN 0-515-03086-4.
- "Ecce Femina!" (1972) - originally published in The Magazine of Fantasy and Science Fiction, February 1972. Anthologized in Above the Human Landscape: A Social Science Fiction Anthology, 1972, ed. Willis E. McNelly, Leon Stover, ISBN 0-87620-003-X.
- "When the Fathers Go" (1982) - originally published in Universe 12, 1982, ed. Terry Carr, ISBN 0-385-17923-5. Anthologized in The Best Science Fiction of the Year 12, 1983, ed. Terry Carr, ISBN 0-671-46680-1 and Alien Sex, 1990, ed. Ellen Datlow, ISBN 0-525-24863-3, among others.
- "Dream Baby" (1987) - originally published in In the Field of Fire, 1987, ed. Jack Dann, Jeanne Van Buren Dann, ISBN 0-312-93008-9, then in Asimov's Science Fiction, October, 1987. Frequently anthologized, as in To Sleep, Perchance to Dream... Nightmare, 1993, ed. Martin H. Greenberg, Robert Weinberg, Stefan R. Dziemianowicz, ISBN 0-88029-903-7. Nominated for the Hugo Award for Best Novelette and Nebula Award for Best Novelette; recipient of a National Endowment for the Arts Creative Writing Fellowship.
- "The Girl Who Loved Animals" (1988) - originally published in Omni, May 1988. Anthologized in American Gothic Tales., among others
- "Cottage" (1993) - originally published in Christmas Forever, 1993, ed. David G. Hartwell, ISBN 0-312-85576-1. Reprinted in The Year's Best Fantasy and Horror: Seventh Annual Collection, 1994, ed. Ellen Datlow, Terri Windling, ISBN 0-312-11103-7.
- "Southpaw" (1993) - originally published in Asimov's Science Fiction, August 1993. Reprinted in Roads Not Taken: Tales of Alternate History, 1998, ed. Gardner Dozois, Stanley Schmidt, ISBN 0-345-42194-9.
- "The Seventh Daughter" (2004) - First published in The Magazine of Fantasy and Science Fiction, April, 2004. Chosen for Year's Best Fantasy 5, 2005, ed. David G. Hartwell, Kathryn Cramer, ISBN 0-06-077605-6.
- "Kin" (2006) - originally published in Asimov's Science Fiction, February 2006. Nominated for the Hugo Award for Best Short Story. Anthologized in Alien Contact, 2012, ed. Marty Halpern, ISBN 978-1-59780-281-9, among others.
- "Ombra" (2006) - in the magazine Glimmer Train Stories #57, Winter, 2006.
- "The Boy in Zaquitos" (2006) - originally published in The Magazine of Fantasy & Science Fiction, January 2006. Reprinted in The Best American Short Stories.
- "Poison" (2007) - First published in Asimov's Science Fiction, January 2007. Chosen for Year's Best Fantasy 8, 2008, ed. David G. Hartwell, Kathryn Cramer, ISBN 1-892391-76-7.
- "Game" - Flash Fiction Online, May, 2008 - http://www.flashfictiononline.com/f20080501-game-bruce-mcallister.html
- "Hit" (2008) - originally published in Aeon Thirteen, 2008, ed. Marti McKenna, Bridget McKenna. Anthologized in By Blood We Live, 2009, ed. John Joseph Adams, ISBN 978-1-59780-156-0, and The Urban Fantasy Anthology, 2011, ed. Peter S. Beagle, Joe R. Lansdale, ISBN 978-1-61696-018-6.
- "Blue Fire" (2010) - The Magazine of Fantasy and Science Fiction, Mar-April, 2010
- "Heart of Hearts" - Albedo One #38, May, 2010
- "The Courtship of the Queen" (2010) - Illustration by Eric Fortune. http://www.tor.com/stories/2010/05/the-courtship-of-the-queen
- "Sun and Stone" (2010) - in Image: A Journal of the Arts & Religion.
- "The Messenger" (2011) - Asimov's Science Fiction, July 2011
- "Stamps" (2012) - Asimov's Science Fiction, August 2012

== Other sources ==
- Bourquin, David Ray. The Work Of Bruce Mcallister: An Annotated Bibliography & Guide. San Bernardino, Calif.: Borgo Press, 1985. (ISBN 089370489X (pbk.); ISBN 0893703893 (hardcover))
- Lohr, Michael. "California Daydreaming: An Interview With Bruce McAllister." Aeon Seven, May, 2006 (Scorpius Digital Publishing, ISBN 1-931386-77-3).
