= Black Oxen =

1923 film by Frank Lloyd

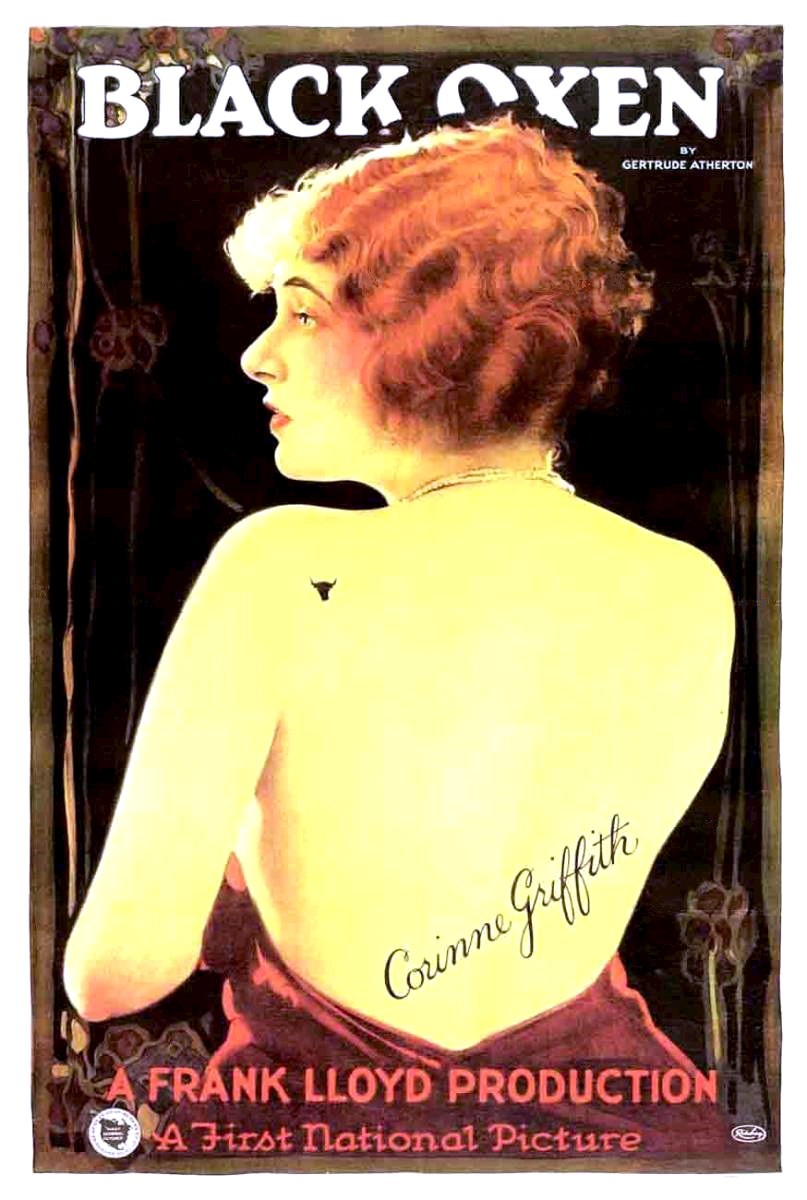
- Directed by: Frank Lloyd
- Written by: Frank Lloyd; Mary O'Hara
- Based on: Black Oxen by Gertrude Atherton
- Produced by: Frank Lloyd
- Starring: Corinne Griffith; Conway Tearle; Clara Bow
- Cinematography: Norbert Brodine
- Edited by: Edward M. Roskam
- Distributed by: Associated First National Pictures
- Release date: December 29, 1923
- Running time: 80 minutes
- Country: United States
- Language: Silent (English intertitles)

Black Oxen

Black Oxen is a 1923 American silent fantasy / romantic drama film starring Corinne Griffith, Conway Tearle, and Clara Bow. Directed by Frank Lloyd, the film is based on the controversial best-selling 1923 novel of the same name by Gertrude Atherton.

Described as "subtle science fiction", the film takes its title from William Butler Yeats: "The years like great Black Oxen tread the world." It was produced by Frank Lloyd Productions and distributed by First National Pictures. A special Photoplay Edition of the novel was published by A. L. Burt Company, New York, illustrated with four stills from the film.

== Plot ==
As described in a film magazine review, having submitted to a medical treatment which restores her youth and beauty using a rejuvenating glandular treatment and X-ray surgery, Madame Zatianny, formerly Mary Ogden of New York City, leaves Austria for the United States. Young playwright Lee Clavering meets the rejuvenated Mary and, taken by her perfect poise and serene beauty, falls in love with her. Janet Oglethorpe, an animated and precocious flapper, is also in love with Lee but he has not yet taken notice of her. Mary and Lee make plans to marry. One of Madame's former lovers, Prince Rohenhauer, arrives and convinces her of the folly of this match. In a final meeting, she makes a break with Clavering and returns to Austria. In the end, Lee discovers happiness with Janet as they ride away in a taxicab.

== Cast ==
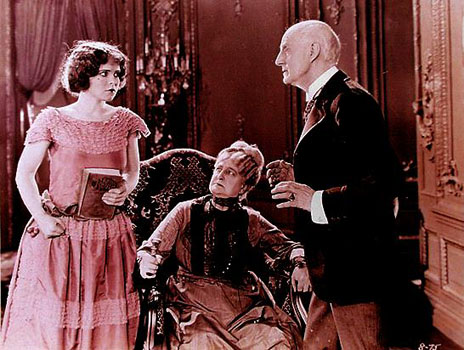
Clara Bow as Janet Oglethorpe, the flapper in Black Oxen, holding a copy of Flaming Youth. With Kate Lester and Tom Ricketts

- Corinne Griffith as Madame Zatianny / Mary Ogden
- Conway Tearle as Lee Clavering
- Clara Bow as Janet Oglethorpe
- Tom Ricketts as Charles Dinwiddie
- Carmelita Geraghty as Anna Goodrich
- Tom Guise as Judge Gavin Trent
- Alan Hale as Prince Rohenhauer
- Kate Lester as Jane Oglethorpe
- Harry Mestayer as James Oglethorpe
- Claire McDowell as Agnes Trevor
- Lincoln Stedman as Donnie Ferris
- Ione Atkinson as Flapper
- Mila Constantin as Flapper
- Fred Gamble as Oglethorpe Butler
- Otto Lederer as Austrian Advisor
- Clarissa Selwynne as Gora Dwight
- Eric Mayne as Chancellor
- Otto Nelson as Dr. Steinach
- Hortense O'Brien as Flapper
- Wilhelm von Brincken as Aide to Prince Rohenhauer (uncredited)
- Percy Williams as Ogden Butler

== Advertisement of the film ==
In 1923 motion picture industry magazine promotions, Corinne Griffith was used to advertise the movie because she was a known star and considered one of the most beautiful actresses in cinema. Publications also used the W. B. Yeats couplet, "The years like Great Black Oxen tread the world // And God the herdsman goads them on behind." This is quoted on the title page of the novel in its first edition and at the opening of the film.

== Preservation ==
The George Eastman Museum retains a print of the film which is incomplete, comprising the first seven reels, but not the eighth. In 2010, it undertook restoration of the 35mm print, funded by The National Film Preservation Fund. The Gosfilmofond Russian State Archive also holds an incomplete copy, consisting of all reels with the exception of Reel 2. The New York Public Library has a 16mm print available in three film reels. A 60-minute version mastered by eBay retailer Buyers’ Gallery Video is available on DVD. No complete version of the film is currently commercially available.

Out of 58 films that star Corinne Griffith, Black Oxen is one of approximately ten that are available for viewing.
