= The Girl Who Loved Animals =

- Short story by Bruce McAllister
- Country: United States
- Language: English
- Genres: Horror fiction, Gothic Literature

Publication
- Published in: Omni
- Media type: Print
- Publication date: May 1988

"The Girl Who Loved Animals" is a short story by American writer Bruce McAllister. This particular work of short fiction was originally published in Omni in May 1988. It was included in the anthology American Gothic Tales in 1996 along. The story describes a future where primates are extinct and young impressionable women are targeted for an experimental procedures to impregnate them with a primate embryo, in an effort to bring back the species.

== Plot ==
Set in the near future and narrated by Jo, a Victim Rights Advocate, the story begins as Jo arrives at the high-tech thirty-three million dollar holding cell where Lissy Tomer is being held. Jo is there to interview the twenty-one-year-old woman who was beaten up by her abusive husband. The holding cell is state of the art with CCTV, microwave eyes, pressure mats, blast doors, laser blinds, eight different kinds of gas, and Vulcan mini cannons from the Helipad three floors above.

Lissy has a history. She was abused as a child by both parents and has fared no better in marriage. Due to her I.Q score of an eighty-four, Lissy is classified as a Collins psycho-type class three dependent with a Vulnerability Rating of a nine-point six, and with all factors considered, County classifies her as protected.

Lissy is pale and skinny, with bloody nose and clothing. But being abused is not the only reason she’s there. Lissy is seven months pregnant; something that her felony restraining option on the marital bond should have helped with. But it's not a normal pregnancy, she has been impregnated with the embryo of an animal.

Jo soon finds out that a man had approached Lissy in the park and that he had noticed how she liked to watch the squirrels in the trees. He was nice and they talked about how she loved animals. The man was a lawyer, and had offered her a lot of money: nine thousand to be exact. But it wasn’t about the money, he had promised she could see and visit the ape when it was born.

The broker represented a species resurrection group; he calls himself a resource advisor because it sounds better. His job was to find woman of childbearing age, in good health, without any drug problems. Lissy was one of ten woman he found who would agree to carry a baby ape. The apes had been extinct for over thirty years, victims of inbred depression, petechial hemorrhages, cirrhosis, and renal failure.

Jo takes a special interest in Lissy, possibly because of her own failure as a mother. Jo has a young daughter who, after a failed sex change operation, turns to drugs. Jo can't help her, or won't, and her daughter wants to hurt her for it.

She is a "walljacker," one of the four-hundred-thousand who cope with an unhappy life by hooking themselves up to a wall jack. In the past, Jo has always been able to shut off the circuit breaker when she finds her, but now her daughter has rigged it so Jo cannot shut it off. She has wired it so no one can turn it off, or death will come to both of them. All she can do for her now is to prolong her life with an I.V, but even then she has two months tops.

After the public outcry it’s decided that the baby ape must be aborted, but Jo finds herself torn and so she works a deal. The broker Group and County agreed on an arrangement, Lissy would have her baby, but would have a post-partum wipe to erase her memory, new I.D, and a fund set up to take care of her afterwards. Her new name is Mary McLoughlin.

A year later as the story comes to a close, Mary is standing in front of the primate exhibit, looking at Cleo, the baby ape, at the San Diego zoo. That is when Mary senses that the baby ape staring at her knows her, but she can’t really remember how that would be possible. Jo shares her last thoughts about Mary (Lissy). Jo has filed for guardianship and if all goes well Lissy will be moving back to L.A with her.
