= Kin (short story) =

- Short story by Bruce McAllister
- Country: United States
- Language: English
- Genre(s): Science fiction

Publication
- Published in: Isaac Asimov's Science Fiction Magazine
- Publication type: magazine
- Publication date: February 2006

"Kin" is a science fiction short story by American writer Bruce McAllister, originally published in the February 2006 issue of the Isaac Asimov's Science Fiction Magazine.

"Kin" was nominated for the 2007 Hugo Award for Best Short Story.

== Plot summary ==
The story is about a small boy named Kim, in a futuristic United States, who the readers find out is talking to an Alien and discussing Kim's desire to have a man killed. It then proceeds to describe the Alien as a race known as the "Antalou" who hail from another planet, likewise noting that interplanetary travel is possible in this story/future. The Antalou was described as an awful creature, with a long neck, and talons, along with a tremendous skull and immense eyes.
