= Atherton House =

Historic house in California, United States

- U.S. National Register of Historic Places
- California Historical Landmark
- San Francisco Designated Landmark
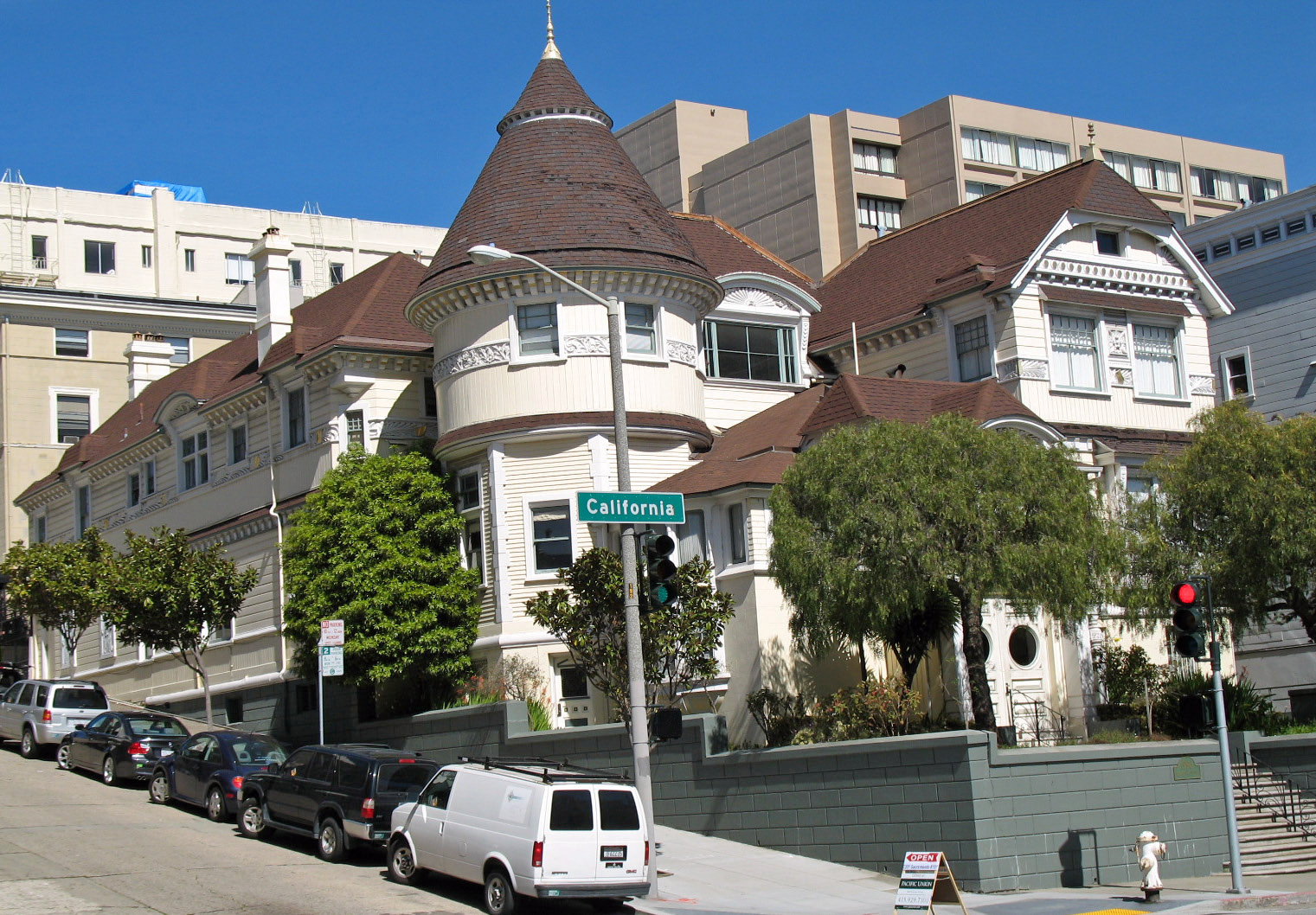

- Location within San Francisco County Location within California Location within the United States
- Location: 1990 California St., San Francisco, California
- Coordinates: 37°47′24.3″N 122°25′37.6″W
- Area: 0.2 acres (0.081 ha)
- Built: 1881
- Architectural style: Stick/Eastlake, Queen Anne
- NRHP reference No.: 79000527
- CHISL No.: N745
- SFDL No.: 70

Significant dates
- Added to NRHP: January 31, 1979
- Designated CHISL: January 31, 1979
- Designated SFDL: February 19, 1975

The Atherton House, also known as the Faxon Atherton Mansion, is a historic building in San Francisco, California, United States. The style of the house, a blend of Queen Anne and Stick-Eastlake, has been described as both "eclectic" and "bizarre".

== Architecture ==
The house was built in 1881–1882 in the Queen Anne style with horizontal lines, a clipped gable, and a short tower. The architect is thought to have been John Marquis, but it has also been attributed to the Moore Brothers, who are depicted in other accounts as the initial builders.

== History ==
It was constructed for Dominga de Goñi Atherton (1823–1890) after the death of her husband Faxon Atherton. She was the mother-in-law of novelist Gertrude Atherton, who wrote about the house in her memoirs. Newspaper articles about the house when the housewarming was held in 1882 described it as picturesque, but appearing to be a relic of an earlier time. The reporter also noted that the height of the rooms created a claustrophobic effect on visitors. Possibly in answer to the comments, Dominga hired Charles Lee Tilden to improve the house.

After Dominga Atherton's death in 1890, the mansion was sold to Edgar Mills, brother of Darius Ogden Mills of the Bank of California, and in 1900 was renumbered from 1950 to 1990 California St. In 1908 it was purchased by George Chauncey Boardman, a real-estate magnate and president of San Francisco Fire Insurance, whose house had been destroyed in the 1906 earthquake and fire. His widow and other family members lived there until 1923, when it was bought by Charles J. Rousseau, an architect, who subdivided it into 13 apartments. His widow Carrie lived there with fifty cats until her death in 1974. As of 2008 it was still subdivided.
