= The Angel Esmeralda =

2011 collection of short stories by Don DeLillo

- First edition
- Author: Don DeLillo
- Language: English
- Genre: Short stories
- Publisher: Scribner
- Publication date: November 2011
- Publication place: United States
- Media type: Print

The Angel Esmeralda: Nine Stories is a collection of short stories by Don DeLillo. The nine stories are printed in chronological order and were written between 1979 and 2011. It is DeLillo's only such collection.

== Contents ==
Story	Originally published in	Date
"Creation"	Antaeus	Spring 1979
"Human Moments in World War III"	Esquire	July 1983
"The Runner"	Harper's	September 1988
"The Ivory Acrobat"	Granta	Autumn 1988
"The Angel Esmeralda"	Esquire	May 1994
"Baader-Meinhof"	The New Yorker	April 1, 2002
"Midnight in Dostoevsky"	The New Yorker	November 30, 2009
"Hammer and Sickle"	Harper's	December 2010
"The Starveling"	Granta	Autumn 2011

== Reception ==
The Guardian described the stories as "masterfully designed" and "great art." Writing in The New Yorker, Martin Amis said: "These nine pieces add up to something considerable, and form a vital addition to the corpus." The New York Times called the stories "excellent" and said "DeLillo packs fertile ruminations and potent consolation into each of these rich, dense, concentrated stories." The Daily Telegraph called the stories "robustly brilliant."

== Awards ==
- Finalist, 2011 The Story Prize
- Finalist, 2012 PEN/Faulkner Award for Fiction
