= Melissa Pritchard =

American writer

- Born: Melissa Brown
- Education: Brown University

Melissa Pritchard (née Brown) is an American short story writer, novelist, essayist, and journalist.

== Life ==
Melissa Brown was born on December 12, 1948, in San Mateo, California. She grew up in San Mateo, Burlingame and Menlo Park and attended the Convent of the Sacred Heart High School in Atherton, California. Her parents are Clarence John Brown, Jr., and Helen Lorraine Reilly Brown; she has one sibling, Penny Lee Byrd. She graduated in 1970 from the University of California, Santa Barbara, with a B.A. in Comparative Religions and in 1995, received an M.F.A. from Vermont College. Her first marriage of five years was to Daniel Hachez, musician and luthier, her second of eleven years to Mark Pritchard, father of her two daughters, Noelle Katarina Pritchard (b. 1977) and Caitlin Skye Pritchard (b. 1982). She began to write fiction in Evanston, Illinois, and her first book, Spirit Seizures, published by the University of Georgia Press in 1987, received the Flannery O’Connor Award and the Carl Sandburg Award. Stories from that collection received an O. Henry Prize Stories Award (“A Private Landscape,”) the James D. Phelan Award and an honorary citation from the PEN/Nelson Algren Award. She raised her daughters in Evanston, Illinois, Taos, New Mexico, and Tempe, Arizona, where she currently teaches at Arizona State University.

== Awards and honors ==
- 1980, 1981, 1983, 1986, 1988 Illinois Arts Council Awards for Fiction
- 1982 National Endowment for the Arts Fellowship
- 1982 James D. Phelan Award, San Francisco Foundation, judge Robert Pinsky
- 1984 Prize Stories: The O.Henry Awards, “A Private Landscape”
- 1987 Flannery O'Connor Award for Short Fiction, Spirit Seizures
- 1987 New York Times Notable Book of the Year, Spirit Seizures
- 1987 PEN/Nelson Algren Award, honorary citation, finalist, judge Stanley Elkin
- 1988 Carl Sandburg Literary Award, Spirit Seizures
- 1988 D.H. Lawrence Fellowship, finalist
- 1988 Great Lakes Colleges New Writers Award, finalist
- 1991 The Best of the West, “Hallie: How Love is Found, When the Heart is Lost”
- 1995 The Claudia Ortese Memorial Lecture Prize, University of Florence, Italy
- 1995 New York Times Editor’s Choice, The Instinct for Bliss
- 1996 PEN/West Award Finalist, The Instinct for Bliss
- 1996 The Janet Heidinger Kafka Prize, University of Rochester, The Instinct for Bliss
- 1996 The Pushcart Prize, “The Instinct for Bliss”
- 1998 Barnes and Noble Discover Great New Writers Award for Selene of the Spirits
- 1998 Howard Foundation Fellowship, Brown University
- 2000 Prize Stories: The O. Henry Award, “Salve Regina”
- 2001 The Pushcart Prize, “Funktionslust”
- 2002 NPR Summer Reading List, Disappearing Ingenue
- 2004 Best Books of 2004, Chicago Tribune, Late Bloomer
- 2004 Southwestern Books of the Year, Late Bloomer
- 2007 Spirit of Mater Award, first annual alumna award, Sacred Heart Preparatory Academy (formerly Convent of the Sacred Heart)
- 2008 Hawthornden International Fellowship, Midlothian, Scotland
- 2010 Advisory Board Member, Afghan Women's Writing Project and Founder, The Ashton Goodman Fund
- 2011 Bogliasco International Fellowship, Liguria, Italy
- 2011 Faculty Achievement Award for Defining Edge Research in Performance and Art Works, Arizona State University
- 2012 Fondation Ledig-Rowohlt Fellowship, Lavigny/Lausanne, Switzerland
- 2013 Founders' Day Faculty Teaching Award, Arizona State University
- 2014 Virginia G. Piper Center for Creative Writing Faculty Development Grant
- 2014 The Atlantic Journalism Award, “100 Fantastic Pieces of Journalism,” for “Still, God Helps You: Memories of a Sudanese Child Slave”
- 2014 Finalist, Katherine Schneider Journalism Award for Excellence in Reporting on a Disability, for “Still God Helps You: Memories of a Sudanese Child Slave"

== Works ==
=== Novels ===
- Phoenix (NY: Cane Hill Press, 1991). ISBN 978-0-943433-08-0
- Selene of the Spirits (NJ: Ontario Review Press, 1998), Barnes and Noble Discover Great Writers Award, 1998. ISBN 978-0-86538-094-3
- Late Bloomer (NY: Doubleday, 2004), starred review, Publishers Weekly; Best Books of 2004, Chicago Tribune; Southwestern Books of the Year, 2004; "Best of 2004," Florida Sun Sentinel. ISBN 978-0-385-72192-9
- Palmerino (NY: Bellevue Literary Press, 2014). ISBN 978-1934137680

=== Short story collections ===
- Spirit Seizures (GA: University of Georgia Press, 1987), The Flannery O’Connor and Carl Sandburg Awards, New York Times Notable Book. ISBN 978-0-8203-0959-0. Re-published in paperback, University of Georgia Press, 2011
- The Instinct for Bliss (MA: Zoland Books, 1995), The Janet Heidinger Kafka Prize, New York Times Editor’s Choice. ISBN 978-0-944072-79-0
- Disappearing Ingenue: The Misadventures of Eleanor Stoddard (NY: Doubleday, 2002), NPR Annual Summer Reading List Selection, 2002. ISBN 978-0-385-50303-7
- The Odditorium (NY: Bellevue Literary Press, 2012), O, The Oprah Magazine “Title to Pick Up Now” & Oprah.com Book of the Week, San Francisco Chronicle Best Book of the Year, Library Journal Best Stories Collection of the Year. ISBN 978-1934137376

=== Biography ===
- Devotedly Virginia: The Life of Virginia Galvin Piper (AZ: Piper Charitable Trust, 2008)

=== Essay Collection ===
- A Solemn Pleasure: The Art of the Essay (NY: Bellevue Literary Press, May 2015)

=== Literary Journal ===
- The American Story: Best of Story Quarterly, co-editors Diane Williams and Anne Brashler (NY: Cane Hill Press, 1990)

=== Select Essays ===
- “The Lost Boys: From Sudan to Phoenix,” feature article, MetroAZ Magazine, Leigh Flayton, editor, Summer 2004
- “A Solemn Pleasure,” Conjunctions Magazine 51, David Shields, editor, Fall 2008
- “A Women’s Garden, Sown in Blood,” The Collagist, Matt Bell, editor, November 2009
- “Finding Ashton, A Soldier’s Story,” O, The Oprah Magazine, Tenth Anniversary Issue, May 2010
- “My, Dachshund, My Dear,” O, The Oprah Magazine, July 2011
- “Doxology,” The Gettysburg Review, Peter Stitt, editor, 2012
- "Still God Helps You: Memories of a Sudanese Child Slave," The Wilson Quarterly, July 2013

=== Select Anthologies (as contributor) ===
- “A Private Landscape,” Prize Stories: The O.Henry Awards, William Abrahams, editor (NY: Random House, 1984)
- “Hallie,” Best of the West 4 (NY: W.W. Norton, 1991)
- “Spirit Seizures,” The Literary Ghost: Great Contemporary Ghost Stories, Larry Dark, editor, (NY: Atlantic Monthly Press, 1991)
- “La Bete,” The Flannery O’Connor Award: Selected Stories, Charles East, editor (GA: University of Georgia Press, 1992)
- “A Graven Space,” The Faraway Nearby: Georgia O'Keeffe as Icon, Radcliffe Biography Series, Christopher Merrill and Ellen Bradbury, editors (MA: Addison Wesley Publishing, 1992)
- “El Ojito del Muerto,” Walking the Twilight, Women Writers of the Southwest (AZ: Northland Publishing, 1994)
- “The Instinct for Bliss,” Pushcart Prize XX, Bill Henderson, editor (NY: Pushcart Press), 1995. ISBN 978-0-916366-96-4
- “Eating for Theodora,” Walking the Twilight II, Women Writers of the Southwest (AZ: Northland Publishing, 1996)
- “The Instinct for Bliss,” Mothers: Twenty Stories of Contemporary Motherhood, Katrina Kenison, editor (NY: Farrar Straus and Giroux, 1996, paperback 1997). ISBN 978-0-374-21375-6
- “Spirit Seizures,” American Gothic Tales, Joyce Carol Oates, editor (NY: Dutton Signet, 1996)
- “Salve Regina,” Prize Stories: The O.Henry Awards, Larry Dark, editor (NY: Random House, 2000)
- “The Instinct for Bliss,” The Prentice Hall Anthology of Women’s Literature (NY: Prentice Hall, 2000)
- “Funktionslust,” Pushcart Prize XXVI, Larry Henderson, editor (NY: Pushcart Press, 2002)
- “Desirelessness,” Desire: Women Write about Wanting, Lisa Solod, editor (NY: Seal Press, 2007)
- “A Solemn Pleasure,” The Inevitable, Contemporary Writers Confront Death, Bradford Morrow and David Shields, editors (NY: W.W. Norton, 2010)

=== In Translation ===
Spirit Seizures:

- Ataques Espirituales (Barcelona, Spain: Alcor, 1990)
- Un Paesaggio Solo Mio (Rome, Italy: Theoria, 1992)

“Sweet Feed”:

- “Nutrimento Prezioso,” Da Costa a Costa: 12 racconti americani di oggi, editor Mario Materassi (Bari, Italy: Palomar Press, 2004)

Phoenix:

- Phoenix, La Vigna Nascosta series, Mario Materassi, editor (Bari, Italy: Palomar Press, 2007)

=== Select Keynotes ===
- “From Vision to Re-vision,” Santa Fe Writer’s Conference, Santa Fe, New Mexico, 1992
- “The Ethics of Fiction,” The Claudia Ortese Memorial Lecture, University of Florence, Florence, Italy, 1995
- “In the Spirit of Mater,” Alumna Award speech, Sacred Heart Preparatory Academy (formerly Convent of the Sacred Heart,) Atherton, California, 2007
- “The Oblivion of Beauty: Women in Panjshir Province, Afghanistan,” Prague Summer Writers Program, Prague, Czech Republic, 2010
- “The Rose: A Hero’s Journey,” Commandant’s Speaker Series, Air Force Institute of Technology, Dayton, Ohio, 2010
- “The Contemporary American Writer: Curator, Witness, Diviner,” Annual Interdisciplinary Seminar on American Studies, Centro di Studi Americani, Rome, Italy, 2011
- “Violet del Palmerino” Seminar, L’Associazione Culturale Il Palmerino, British Institute of Florence, the French Institute of Florence, and Villa il Palmerino, Florence, Italy, 2012
- “The Rose: A Hero’s Journey,” Women in Leadership: Unlocking the Power of Women to Change the World, Womanity Summit, Tempe, Arizona, 2013

=== Humanitarian Work and Related Awards ===
- Workshop Leader, The Daywalka Foundation, Kalam:MarginsWrite poetry workshops with adolescents rescued from human trafficking, Calcutta, India, 2006, 2007, 2009
- “Spirit of Mater” first annual alumna award, Sacred Heart Preparatory School, Atherton, California, (formerly Convent of the Sacred Heart) 2007
- Director, Outreach Project, MFA program, Arizona State University, Phoenix Children’s Hospital, Phoenix, Arizona, 2008
- Mission Participant, Women for World Health, Cuenca Military Hospital, service award from Rotary International, Cuenca, Ecuador, 2008
- Workshop Leader, STOP, poetry and art workshop with adolescents rescued from human trafficking, Delhi, India, 2009
- Advisory Board Member, The Afghan Women’s Writing Project, 2010–present
- Founder, The Ashton Goodman Fund, The Afghan Women’s Writing Project, 2010
- “In My Dreams,” sex trafficking public awareness presentation and choral performance by mezzo-soprano Melissa Walker Glenn, PhD, Orangewood Presbyterian Church, Phoenix, Arizona, February 2011
- Director, “Out of Silence,” staged reading of Afghan women’s writing by ASU MFA students, Project Humanities, Tempe, Arizona, May 2011
- Faculty Achievement Award for Defining Edge Research in Performance and Art Works, Arizona State University, 2011
- Founders' Day Faculty Teaching Award, Arizona State University, 2012
