= An Honorable Profession =

Book by John L'Heureux

- An Honorable Profession book cover
- Author: John L'Heureux
- Language: English
- Genre: Novel
- Published: 1991
- Publication place: United States

An Honorable Profession is a 1991 novel by John L'Heureux and his thirteenth book.

== Plot ==
Miles Bannon is a popular high-school English teacher in Boston who enjoys the respect of his students. His mother is dying. He is in a relationship with Margaret but is plagued by a deep insecurity about his sexual orientation, both in his untoward feelings for boys at school and his gay leanings. He has a one-night stand with Robert, a man whose boyfriend is a student at Miles's school.

Billy Mack, a boy who has been sexually assaulted by a group of older students, develops a crush on Miles, who fails to discourage it. Billy's father Jack, a police officer, accuses his son of behavior that encouraged his abusers, and this further depresses Billy.

Miles rejects the boy's advances, and Billy runs off, committing suicide two hours later in his bedroom. Billy leaves an unfinished suicide note addressed not to his parents, but to Miles. Jack Mack is determined to pin the blame on someone outside the family and makes allegations against Miles.

Miles confronts his own nature as he faces the opprobrium of his colleagues and the homophobia of the local community and media.

== Reception ==
It was a 1991 New York Times Notable Book, described as "… a risky combination: a thriller, a philosophical, melodramatic novel of sexual possession, a satire of small-town mores in New England."
