= The Reencounter =

"The Reencounter" is a short story by American writer Isaac Bashevis Singer. It was published in The Atlantic's on July 1, 1979. The story takes place in New York City and deals with death and the idea of an afterlife.

== Plot summary ==
The story begins with Dr. Max Greitzer waking to the sound of his telephone. The voice on the other line tells him that a woman he'd dated previously, Liza Nestling, had died and that the funeral was to be held at eleven.

It had been twelve years since the two had broken up. They had a thirteen-year love affair full of many misunderstandings and complications. After the breakup, the two never spoke to one another again.

Dr. Greitzer heads to the funeral parlor and is told by the receptionist that he is too early. He asks if he may see the body, and he is escorted to the room. As he studied the body, a woman who resembled Liza entered the room. Thinking she must be Liza's sister, Dr. Greitzer makes nothing of it. Eventually the two strike up a conversation. The woman tells Max that she'd seen his obituary in the newspapers. It is then revealed that both Liza and Max are dead. They then banter between Max and Liza about the nature of death, the thought of their afterlife and of immortality.
