= Breece D'J Pancake =

American short story writer

- Born: June 29, 1952; Milton, West Virginia, U.S.
- Died: April 8, 1979 (aged 26); Charlottesville, Virginia, U.S.
- Education: Marshall University; University of Virginia
- Occupation: Short story writer

Breece Dexter John Pancake (June 29, 1952 – April 8, 1979) was an American short story writer, called "one of the greatest authors you've never heard of" in an article on his work in Study Breaks. Pancake was a native of West Virginia. Several of his short stories were published in The Atlantic Monthly and other periodicals during his lifetime.

Pancake died from suicide in 1979 on Palm Sunday. He was 26.

== Biography ==
=== Early life and education (1952–1974) ===
Breece Dexter John Pancake was born and raised in Milton, West Virginia. As the youngest child of Clarence "Wicker" and Helen Frazier Pancake, Breece had two sisters. Later, he seems to have drawn inspiration from Milton—with its plateau of farms outside the city of Huntington—for the fictionalized settings of his stories.

During his early years, Pancake often listened to conversations between older men and women and also spent time eating at soup kitchens with the homeless—all of which influenced his writing.

Pancake briefly attended West Virginia Wesleyan College in Buckhannon before transferring to Marshall University in Huntington, where he completed a bachelor's degree in English education in 1974. After graduation, he spent time in the western United States, primarily visiting his sister in Santa Fe.

=== Later education ===
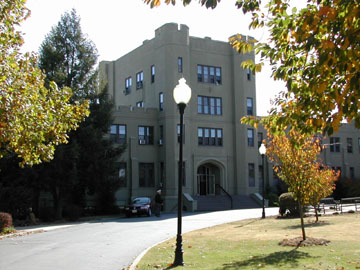
Fork Union, where Pancake worked

As a graduate student, he studied at the University of Virginia's creative writing program under John Casey, who became his godfather after his conversion to Catholicism and later organized his unfinished works for publication, and James Alan McPherson. Pancake also worked as an English teacher at two Virginia military academies, Fork Union and Staunton.

Pancake experienced a sense of alienation at the University of Virginia, feeling that faculty and staff looked down on him, despite the institution's proximity to his native state. Still, he remained a gregarious person, who befriended everyone he could. But his dependence on alcohol increasingly isolated him, likely contributing to his depressive state.

== Personal life ==
Pancake was an avid outdoorsman, who enjoyed hunting, fishing, and camping. He was also a devout fan of folk singer Phil Ochs, who had attended Staunton Military Academy prior to Pancake's teaching there.

The writer's unusual middle name, "D'J," originated in 1977, when The Atlantic Monthly misprinted his middle initials (D.J., for Dexter John) in the byline for his short story Trilobites. Pancake decided not to correct it. Dexter had been his given middle name, and John was the name he added after converting to Catholicism in his mid-20s.

== Suicide ==
On the outskirts of Charlottesville, Virginia, Pancake died in 1979 from a self-inflicted gunshot wound. He was buried in Milton, West Virginia.

His motives are still unclear, and some family members maintained the death was accidental. Others speculated that ongoing grief related to the deaths of his father from multiple sclerosis and of close friend Matthew Heard in a car accident (occurring three weeks apart, on September, 8 and 29, respectively) may have influenced his decision to end his own life.

According to Ruel Foster in his 1999 review of Thomas E. Douglass's A Room Forever: The Life, Work, and Writings of Breece D'J Pancake, "One cannot consider Pancake's work without probing his tragic death. Douglass points out that, in hindsight, there were many indications of Pancake's suicidal longings," such as the act of giving away many personal items, including his guns, with the exception of the Savage over-under shotgun he used to end his life.

Sam Sacks of The Wall Street Journal described Pancake's death as "A Voice Stilled Too Soon" and called his suicide a "tragic mistake," insisting that it resulted from a particularly bad night, rather than inevitable circumstances. Sacks concluded this argument by proclaiming that Pancake's stories, his legacy, are "heartbreaking not for their potential, but for their perfection."

Mike Murphy in American Myth: The Short, Beautiful Myth of Breece D'J Pancake, wrote that the late author "has become a semi-mythical figure of American Literature, a hillbilly Hemingway for those few—heavy on writers and academicians—who do know him. Parts of the myth he created for himself are through the way he lived his life and the foggy circumstances surrounding his death. The rest of the myth we've created ourselves around the legacy of his extraordinary writing."

Pancake's papers are held at the West Virginia & Regional History Center, the West Virginia University Libraries at West Virginia University and the Albert and Shirley Small Special Collections Library at the University of Virginia.

== Writing ==
Pancake published six short stories in his lifetime, most in The Atlantic. These stories were collected in The Stories of Breece D'J Pancake (1983). The volume was reprinted in 2002 with a new afterword by Andre Dubus III.

=== Style ===
"His ambition was not primarily literary: he was struggling to define for himself an entire way of life, an all-embracing code of values that would allow him to live outside his home valley in Milton, West Virginia," pointed out Alan McPherson, according to Gower in The Stories (and Life) of Breece D'J Pancake. The late writer's vivid, compact style has been compared to that of Ernest Hemingway. Gower describes Pancake's characters as "piercing, beautiful, and even haunting" and his stories as possessing a rare universality that stems from his use of "un-universal characters."

According to Foster, "All of Pancake's stories have a dreamlike quality—they don't explain themselves and they are never unequivocal; readers must make their own interpretations. His canvas is littered with the old broken-down autos, the detritus of an industrial age—all symbols of blight and sterility."

=== Content ===
Most of Pancake's stories are set in rural West Virginia and revolve around characters and naturalistic settings, many adapted from his own past. Even during his lifetime, his writing drew acclaim from both readers and critics. The Atlantic's editor recalled receiving letters that "drifted in for months – asking for more stories—inquiring for collected stories, or simply expressing admiration and gratitude ... in 30-something years at The Atlantic, I cannot recall a response to a new author like the response to this one."

In the New Yorker, Jon Michaud called Pancake's host of hard-working characters facing increasingly dire economic circumstances "both immediately recognizable and pertinent to the present moment," potently conveying the cultural destruction in the wake of industrialization.

The Cleveland Review of Books said Pancake's "letters reveal a complex figure who loved his home and family, was dedicated to his craft, and was restlessly uncomfortable when not writing, revising, hunting, or fishing." His writing is often considered part of the southern “grit lit” movement that includes writers Harry Crews, Barry Hannah, and Larry Brown.

=== Influences ===
Among the writers who claim Pancake as a strong influence are Chuck Palahniuk, author of Fight Club and Andre Dubus III, author of House of Sand and Fog. After Pancake's death, author Kurt Vonnegut wrote in a letter to John Casey, "I give you my word of honor that he is merely the best writer, the most sincere writer I've ever read. What I suspect is that it hurt too much, was no fun at all to be that good. You and I will never know."

The song "River Towns," from Dire Straits' front man Mark Knopfler's 2015 studio album Tracker, was inspired by Pancake's "A Room Forever," the story of a tugboat mate spending New Year's Eve in an eight-dollar-a-night hotel room where he drinks cheap whiskey out of the bottle and eventually ends up with a teen-aged prostitute.

== Publications ==
Title	Publication	Collected in
"Keeper of the Flame"	Milton High School newspaper, 1968	-
"The Mark"	Rivanna (February 25, 1976)	The Stories of Breece D'J Pancake
"Hollow"	The Declaration (September 30, 1976)	The Stories of Breece D'J Pancake
"The Way It Has to Be" aka "Cowboys and Girls"	The Declaration (October 21, 1976)	The Stories of Breece D'J Pancake
"Trilobites"	The Atlantic (December 1977)	The Stories of Breece D'J Pancake
"In the Dry"	The Atlantic (August 1978)	The Stories of Breece D'J Pancake
"Time and Again"	Nightwork (September 1978)	The Stories of Breece D'J Pancake
"The Honored Dead"	The Atlantic (January 1981)	The Stories of Breece D'J Pancake
"A Room Forever"	Antaeus (December 1981)	The Stories of Breece D'J Pancake
"Fox Hunters"	The Stories of Breece D'J Pancake (1983)	The Stories of Breece D'J Pancake
"The Scrapper"	The Stories of Breece D'J Pancake (1983)	The Stories of Breece D'J Pancake
"The Salvation of Me"	The Stories of Breece D'J Pancake (1983)	The Stories of Breece D'J Pancake
"First Day of Winter"	The Stories of Breece D'J Pancake (1983)	The Stories of Breece D'J Pancake
"Rat Boy"	Appalachian Journal 19.1 (Fall 1991)	-

== Awards and honors ==
- Governor's Fellowship in Fiction Writing from University of Virginia 1976
- Jefferson Society Fiction Award from University of Virginia 1977
- Hoyns Fellowship for Fiction Writing from University of Virginia 1978
- West Virginia Library Association Annual Book Award 1983 (posthumous)
