= Time Again (disambiguation) =

Time Again is a punk rock band.

Time Again may also refer to:

- Time Again (Claire Voyant album), 2000
- Time Again (David Sanborn album), 2003
- Time Again... Amy Grant Live, an album by Amy Grant

== See also ==
- Christmas Time Again
- Construction Time Again
- Killing Time Again
- "Time Again and World"
- Time and Again (disambiguation)
