= Time and Again (short story) =

"Time and Again" is a short story by American writer Breece D'J Pancake, first published in 1977. This American Gothic tale tells the story of an aging murderer, a farmer who feeds the bodies of his victims to his hogs. The short story appears in Pancake's only book, The Stories of Breece D'J Pancake (1983). It can also be found in the anthology American Gothic Tales, edited by Joyce Carol Oates. The story was based on “The Mad Butcher” of Fayette County, WV, an unsolved string of murders in the Ansted, WV area from 1962–64.

== Plot summary ==
The story opens with a nameless narrator who tells the gothic tale in first-person narrative. The narrator lets the reader know that he was once again called out to work, by Mr. Weeks, but when he leaves the old house he left the kitchen light burning just in case his boy returns. As the man walks out of the house towards his snowplow, the hogs that he owns start to squeal because they believe it is feeding time. Then he brushes the snow off of his plow and begins describing the inside to the reader. Once he has the plow warmed up and ready to go he heads to the mountain road to start plowing and salting the icy roads.

The narrator talks of how he wishes he did not work anymore and how he was getting too old to do it. He wants to stop work to watch his hogs grow old and die. Next, the narrator goes on to talk about how Mr. Weeks brags of what a good job he does plowing the roads. While the narrator plows one side of the road, Mr. Weeks plows the other so they will honk to each other as they pass on another. The two are not good friends; they are just coworkers, and the narrator has only ever seen Mr. Weeks on his snowplow.

On this night, as he is plowing down the road, he spots a hitchhiker. The man stops to let him in and they begin to talk. As the hitchhiker continues in conversation the man thinks to himself that he talks a lot like his boy used to. Then the man sees the lights of Mr. Weeks' snowplow and tells the boy to hide because he could get in trouble for picking up hitchhikers. After that, the two converse about how a lot of hitchhikers get killed up by the mountain road. The boy tells him that bones have been found in a duffel bag. A soldier and a disabled man are among those killed. The boy thinks it is "creepy."

Now the man has reached the spot where he has to turn around, and the boy has to get out. Before he gets out the man asks the boy to look under his seat for a flashlight. As the boy is looking the narrator says to himself that he is too tired and he does not want to clean the seat. The reason for this would be because he was going to kill him while he was looking away, but the boy is very lucky on this night.

== Sources ==
- Lloyd-Smith, Alan (2004). American Gothic Fiction. New York: Continuum.
- Oates, Joyce Carol (1996). American Gothic Tales. New York: Plume.
