= Subsoil (short story) =

"SUBSOIL"
- Short story by Nicholson Baker
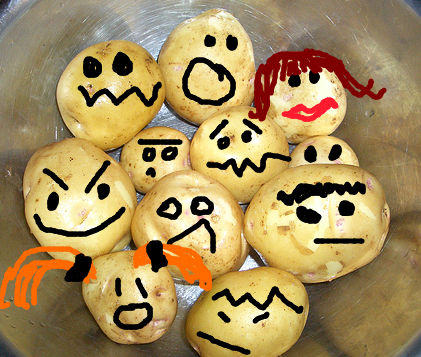
- Country: United States
- Language: English
- Genre: Gothic fiction short story

Publication
- Published in: The New Yorker
- Publication type: Newspaper
- Media type: Print
- Publication date: June 27, 1994

"Subsoil" is a short story by American writer Nicholson Baker, which first appeared in The New Yorker periodical on June 27, 1994.

The story is about a man who meets his doom after being assaulted by attacking, sprouting potatoes that lure agriculturalists into their sleepy Krebs Cycle.

== Plot summary ==
Nyle T. Milner, an overly meticulous agricultural historian, is busy researching and working on a book about the early harrow. While visiting the Museum of the Tractor, located in Harvey, New York, for the fourth time, he asks the curator, Bill Fipton, for new recommendations of accommodations. Bill offers up "The Taits" in stating that they make an "interesting" soup. After he arrives at their house, Nyle explores his room and comes across a Mr. Potato Head Kit. When he opens the box, he is surprised and disgusted to find a very old but real potato with all the facial features still punctured into it. The mummified potato disturbs him.

Following his encounter with the potato, Nyle makes his way down from his room for dinner. He learns that the menu is leek and potato soup; however, he is the only one eating it. After some time, he mentions the Mr. Potato Head Kit he had found earlier and states how it had startled him. After dinner, Mrs. Tait leads Nyle into the kitchen, revealing to him dozens of potatoes of all shapes and sizes and mentioning that they only use "aged" ones. Nyle leaves the Taits downstairs and proceeds to his room. While trying to fall asleep he wondered why Mrs. Tait left a cabinet door open.

In the night, Nyle wakes up to venture back downstairs to the kitchen and close the bothersome cabinet, though when he gets to the door of the bedroom, he notices a sprout coming through the keyhole. He opens the door and notices a dozen or more potato sprouts coming up the stairs toward him. Nyle goes back inside his room and tries to blockade the door. The potatoes are coming after him. Nyle attempts to escape by climbing through his closet into the attic; however, the dead Mr. Potato Head's spuds' spawn veer toward Nyle's face, causing him to fall. The potatoes begin to insert themselves into his body, planting themselves in any available orifice. Nyle's body is consumed by potato sprouts.

After some time, Nyle wakes up in a very dark place, thinking potato thoughts. A child selects him from among other tubers, and he is whisked away from the cabinet he has been in to be played with. The child pushes the Mr. Potato Head features into Nyle, but tires and puts him into the box. Many years later, a man opens the box and is frightened by the mummified potato, which ultimately signals a renewed cycle of potato growth.

== Sources ==
- Saltzman, Arthur. "American Novelists Since World War II". Dictionary of Literary Biography. 227 (Sixth series).
- Walkenbach, John (September 3, 2008), Nicholson Baker Fan Page, archived from the original on August 30, 2009
