= Human Moments in World War III =

"Human Moments in WWIII" is a science fiction short story by American writer Don DeLillo, originally published in a 1983 issue of Esquire Magazine and later incorporated into his published short story collection The Angel Esmeralda. It revolves around two astronauts, whose interactions are described while orbiting above an Earth torn apart by armed conflicts (hence the title) of ambiguous origin.

== Plot summary ==
The narrative follows a first-person narrator and his companion, Vollmer, as they orbit above a war-torn Earth. Their mission involves collecting information and monitoring enemy satellites for Colorado Command. The narrator reflects on the changes that occur in individuals who spend extended periods in space, including himself and Vollmer. They discuss their personal effects and daily routines on the mission, contrasting them with the routines back home on Earth. While inspecting potential laser activity in an orbital section called "Dolores," the narrator becomes increasingly irritated by Vollmer's voice and his tendency to avoid deep conversations. The war has been ongoing for only three weeks, and both the narrator and Vollmer share a sense of dissatisfaction and fatigue with the conflict. The narrator fears that Vollmer's convictions about society and their situation align too closely with his own, and he chooses not to share his thoughts openly.

During their mission, they receive a faint signal that interrupts their communications. The narrator insists that he hears a voice, but Colorado Command dismisses it as selective noise. Later, Vollmer also hears voices through the signal, recognizing them as radio signals from decades earlier. This discovery fascinates Vollmer, but it further intensifies the narrator's frustration and fear of Vollmer's 'human' insights. As they observe the Earth's landmasses below, Vollmer appreciates the power of science in naming the features of the world, triggering the narrator's anxieties about Vollmer's non-scientific wonderment.

The narrator, lacking specific knowledge and degrees, grows increasingly frustrated when Vollmer indulges in awe and happiness instead of adhering to routine checks. The narrator reflects on the destructive power of laser technology, considering it a manifestation of humanity's fear of the overwhelming power of light. As they prepare to fire the laser, thoughts of devastation and horror on Earth occupy the narrator's mind. He finds satisfaction in his structured life but feels ashamed of the pleasure derived from it.

Vollmer asks the narrator if he has ever experienced a sense of well-being so powerful that it led to arrogance and superiority over others. The narrator silently admits to such feelings. They continue their mission over the Missouri River and Minnesota, Vollmer's home state. Vollmer's excitement and nostalgia bring forth more 'human moments' for the narrator. They listen to old radio programs through ghost signals as they prepare for a quantum burn.

The narrator realizes that war has replaced everyday life and eliminated the space for human moments. Vollmer's changing outlook makes the narrator wonder if humans are alone in the universe and if the meaning of existence is determined by each generation's attitude. Vollmer's patience with Colorado Command wanes, and the narrator grows increasingly irritated with him. Vollmer becomes withdrawn and non-verbal, finding satisfaction and fulfillment in observing Earth. The story ends with Vollmer's statement, "It's just so interesting... the colors and all," echoing in the narrator's mind.
