= John L'Heureux =

American author (1934–2019)

John Clarke L'Heureux (October 26, 1934 – April 22, 2019) was an American author. L'Heureux was the author of such works of fiction as The Miracle, Having Everything, The Shrine at Altamira, Comedians, An Honorable Profession, and A Woman Run Mad. A former Jesuit priest (he left the order in 1971) and contributing editor to The Atlantic Monthly, he taught at Georgetown, Tufts, Harvard, and was a professor of English at Stanford University since 1973.

== Early years ==
John Clarke L'Heureux was born in South Hadley, Massachusetts, on 26 October 1934; his parents were Wilfred and Mildred L'Heureux. After two years at the College of the Holy Cross in Worcester, Massachusetts, he entered the Society of Jesus (the Jesuits) at the age of nineteen and began his path to ordination as a priest in 1956. During these years, he published several books of poetry and a journal, Picnic in Babylon: A Jesuit Priest's Journal, 1963-1967 (1967), which chronicled his final years of seminary study. The latter part of L'Heureux's life as a Jesuit coincided with the upheaval the Roman Catholic Church experienced in the wake of the Second Vatican Council (1962–1965), which was convened to "open the church's windows" more widely to the complicated aspirations of the modern world. The turbulence that accompanied engagement with the world proved to be both exhilarating and disruptive for an entire generation of priests and nuns. L'Heureux's career as a priest, which included time as a graduate student in English at Harvard and a stint as a staff editor at The Atlantic Monthly, was fairly conventional for an unconventional time. He earned degrees from Weston College (BA), Boston College (MA), Woodstock College (STL), and Harvard University (MA).

== Writing career ==
L'Heureux left the priesthood and was laicized in 1971; that year he also married Joan Polston, the dedicatee of most of his subsequent books. He wrote in Picnic in Babylon, "I became a Jesuit, paradoxically, on the grounds of coldest reason: I felt God wanted me to, I could, and therefore I should. So I did." He explained some of the reasons behind his leaving the priesthood to The National Catholic Reporter (NCR) in an article published on 11 May 1990 to coincide with the release of his short-story collection Comedians.

L'Heureux published three collections of poetry before he began to write fiction. His poem "from St. Ignatius Loyola, Founder of the Jesuits: His Autobiography [with directions for reading]" (in No Place for Hiding, 1971) bridged verse and narrative prose. L'Heureux said later in an unpublished interview that he "never looked back. It became more satisfying to explore consciousnesses different from one's own." His short fiction began appearing in The New Yorker, The Atlantic Monthly, Harper's, Esquire, and several literary journals, and has been included in Prize Stories: The O. Henry Awards and The Best American Short Stories.

== Death and final works ==
L'Heureux died April 22, 2019, in Palo Alto, California, by suicide because he lived with Parkinson's disease. https://stanfordmag.org/contents/novelist-and-writing-mentor He was 84. His final essay, "John L'Heureux on Death and Dignity," was published in The New Yorker the following April 29, with the announcement that a new collection of his stories, The Heart is a Full-Wild Beast, and his last novel, The Beggar's Pawn, would be published in 2020.

== Works ==
=== Novels ===
- Tight White Collar (1972)
- The Clang Birds (1972)
- Jessica Fayer (1976)
- A Woman Run Mad (1988)
- An Honorable Profession (1991)
- The Shrine at Altamira (1992)
- The Handmaid of Desire (1996)
- Having Everything (1999)
- The Miracle (2002)
- The Medici Boy (2013)
- The Beggar’s Pawn (2020)

=== Short stories ===
- Family Affairs (1974)
- Desires (1981)
- Comedians (1990)
- The Heart Is a Full-Wild Beast: New and Selected Stories (2020)

=== Poetry ===
- Quick as Dandelions (1964)
- Rubrics for a Revolution (1967)
- One Eye and a Measuring Rod (1968)
- No Place for Hiding (1971)

=== Other books ===
- Picnic in Babylon: A Jesuit Priest’s Journal (1967)
- Conversations with John L'Heureux (2011) https://web.stanford.edu/group/cslipublications/cslipublications/site/9781575866017.shtml
