= Gertrude Atherton =

American author (1857–1948)

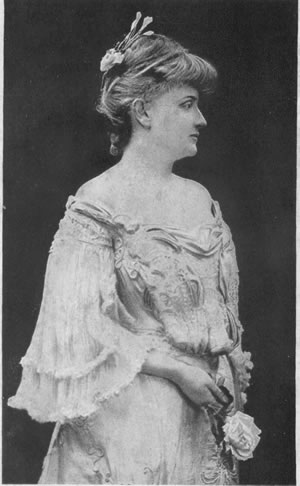
- Atherton in a 1905 publication
- Born: Gertrude Franklin Horn; October 30, 1857; San Francisco, California, U.S.
- Died: June 14, 1948 (aged 90); San Francisco, California, U.S.
- Education: D. Litt., Mills College; LL.D., University of California
- Occupations: Novelist and short story writer
- Spouse: George H. B. Atherton (m. 1876; died 1887)
- Writing career
- Pen name: Asmodeus, Frank Lin
- Notable awards: International Academy of Letters and Sciences of Italy (Gold Medal); Legion of Honor honorary member, 1925; American Academy of Arts and Letters, 1938

Gertrude Franklin Horn Atherton (October 30, 1857 – June 14, 1948) was an American writer. Many of her novels are set in her home state of California. Her bestselling novel Black Oxen (1923) was made into a silent movie of the same name. In addition to novels, she wrote short stories, essays, and articles for magazines and newspapers on such issues as feminism, politics, and war.

== Early life and education ==
Gertrude Franklin Horn was born on October 30, 1857, in San Francisco, California, to Thomas Ludovich Horn and his wife, Gertrude Franklin. Her father had become a prominent citizen in San Francisco as a tobacco merchant, although he originally hailed from Stonington, Connecticut. Her mother was from New Orleans. Her parents separated in 1860 when she was two years old, and she was raised by her maternal grandfather, Stephen Franklin, a devout Presbyterian and a relative of Benjamin Franklin. Grandfather Franklin insisted she be well read, and this influenced her greatly. She attended St. Mary's Hall high school in Benicia, California, and, briefly, the Sayre School in Lexington, Kentucky.

Gertrude moved back to California to live with her grandfather and mother after her aunt refused to house her any longer because of her rebelliousness. There she met George H.B. Atherton, son of Faxon Atherton, who was courting her mother. He became more interested in daughter Gertrude, and after she accepted his sixth proposal, they eloped on February 15, 1876. She lived with him and his domineering Chilean mother. Gertrude found life in the Atherton mansion in San Francisco and on their Fair Oaks estate, now Atherton, California, stifling. Disappointed with the marriage, she began to develop an independent life. Two tragedies changed her life dramatically: Her son George died of diphtheria, and her husband died at sea. She was left alone with their daughter Muriel and needed to support herself. Her mother in law agreed to raise Muriel and give her the inheritance that would have gone to George.

Atherton later told an interviewer that the books that had influenced her the most were Hippolyte Taine's "History of English Literature" and the books of Herbert Spencer.

== Career ==
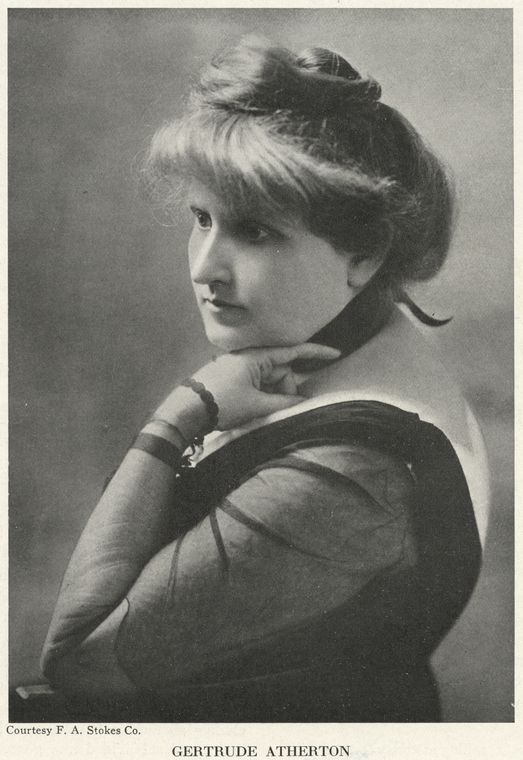
Atherton early in her career

Atherton's first publication was "The Randolphs of Redwood: A Romance", serialized in The Argonaut in March 1882 under the pseudonym Asmodeus. When she revealed to her family that she was the author, she was ostracized. In 1888, she left for New York, leaving Muriel with her grandmother. She traveled to London, and eventually returned to California. Atherton's first novel, What Dreams May Come, was published in 1888 under the pseudonym Frank Lin.

In 1889, Atherton went to Paris at the invitation of her sister-in-law Alejandra Rathbone (married to Major Jared Lawrence Rathbone). That year, she heard from British publisher G. Routledge and Sons that they would publish her first two books. William Sharp wrote in The Spectator praising her fiction and would later invite Atherton to stay with him and his wife, Elizabeth, in South Hampstead.

In London, Atherton had the opportunity through Jane Wilde to meet her son, Oscar Wilde. She recalled in her memoir Adventures of a Novelist (1932) that she made an excuse to avoid the meeting because she thought he was physically repulsive. In an 1899 article for London's Bookman, Atherton wrote of Wilde's style and associated it with "the decadence, the loss of virility that must follow over-civilization."

Also in London, she met a young Winston Churchill, who said that he liked her novels. She soon learned that Churchill was disappointed that she did not return the compliment; she was not aware of his writing.

Atherton returned to California in 1890 following the death of her grandfather, Franklin, and her mother-in-law Dominga Atherton, and she resumed care of Muriel. In 1891, while writing a weekly column for The San Francisco Examiner, she met Ambrose Bierce, with whom she carried on a taunting, tumultuous friendship.

When Kate Field remarked on California writers' neglect of the picturesque and romantic old Spanish life of the state, Atherton explored the history and culture of Spanish California in Monterey, San Juan Bautista, Los Angeles, San Luis Obispo, and Santa Barbara. She became a member of the Pacific Coast Women's Press Association.

Atherton wrote The Doomswoman in 1892, and it was published in Lippincott's Monthly Magazine before being published in book form in 1893. The story (set in the 1840s) focuses on Chonita Moncada y Iturbi and her love of Diego Estenega (modeled after Mariano Guadalupe Vallejo), as he dreams of modernizing California, retaining its Mexican character without sacrificing American economic vigor. Chonita is Catholic, and her faith stands in the way of Diego's political ambitions. The dramatic climax peaks when Diego kills Chonita's brother, Reynaldo, and she is forced to choose between her cultural loyalty or her love for Diego. The plot of the novel closely resembles that of Romeo and Juliet. The book was successful with critics, some comparing it to Helen Hunt Jackson's Ramona. Atherton was not pleased with this comparison because Jackson was not from California. However, she was satisfied when Bierce said of The Doomswoman that it was "in its class... superior to any that any Californian has done".

In 1892, Atherton left for New York. There she wrote for the New York World. She also wrote letters to Bierce, confiding her loneliness, her dismay at the necessity to do freelance writing (in particular for the New York World), and her dislike of eastern literary circles. Her distaste came from their belittlement of the Western United States and its authors and the fact they did not accept Bierce's work. While in New York, she published another California novel, Before the Gringo Came (1894).

Atherton next wrote Patience Sparhawk and Her Times, A Novel (1897), but it proved to be too controversial for publication. Its rejection encouraged her to leave for London. In 1898, John Lane of The Bodley Head agreed to publish it, but not for two years. She continued to write, writing book reviews for Oliver Fry's Vanity Fair, and even completed a book-length version of "The Randolphs of Redwood" (retitled A Daughter of the Vine, 1899) while staying in Haworth. Max Pemberton asked her to write a 10,000 word essay for a series he was editing for Cassells Pocket Library, which she wrote as A Whirl Asunder (1895).

Once Patience Sparhawk and Her Times, A Novel was published, William Robertson Nicoll gave a review of it in the April 12, 1897 edition of The Bookman that said it was "crude" in its portrayal of a clever young woman with burning interest in life and identified it as a protest against the tame American novel. In the May 15 issue of The New York Times, the reviewer said that Atherton had "incontestable" ability and a "very original talent" while noting that the book offered a series of "fleshy" episodes in Patience's life that may scare a sensitive reader. It was banned from the San Francisco Mechanics' Institute, and the San Francisco Call review said it represented Atherton's departure from her proper literary goal of treating early California themes romantically.

In 1898, Atherton completed The Californians, her first novel set in the post-Spanish era. Critics received this much more positively than Patience, and a review in The Spectator (October 1, 1898) said it "was by far more convincing and attractive in delineating California manners and morals.... The novel fairly establishes her claim to be considered as one of the most vivid and entertaining interpreters of the complex characters of emancipated American womanhood." The November 8 Bookman said it was her "most ambitious work," which has "a feeling of surety that only the consciousness of knowing one's ground can convey."

Atherton traveled to Rouen and wrote American Wives and English Husbands (1898), set in contemporary time. In this novel, she contrasts English and American men, American and English cultures, and comments on the relationships between men and women. She also completed The Valiant Runaways (1898), an adventure novel for boys that dealt with the Spanish Mexican attempt to civilize California. In 1899, she returned to the United States.

Atherton's novel Senator North (1900) was based on Maine's senator Eugene Hale.

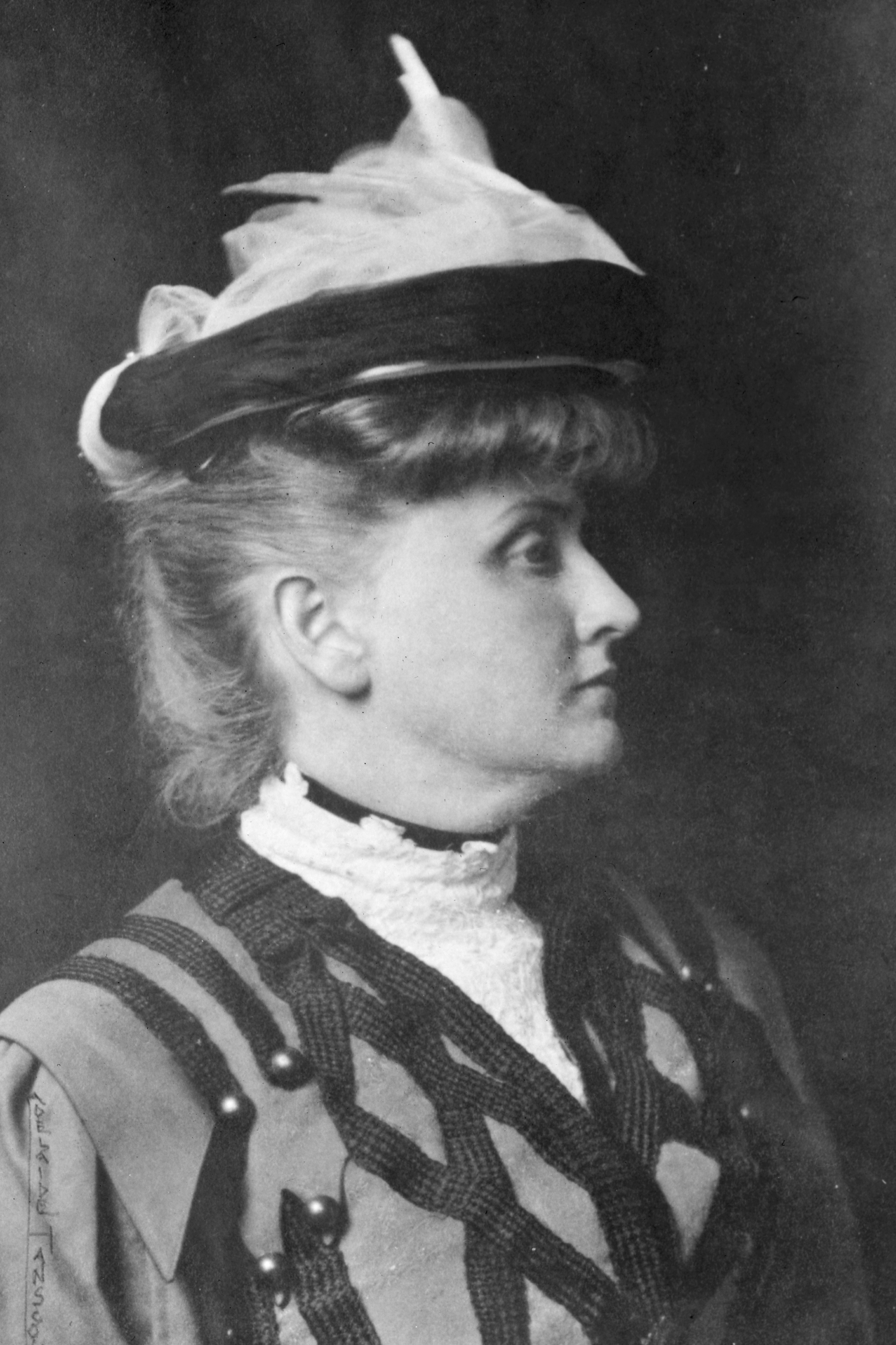
Gertrude Atherton, ca. 1904

In a May 1904 article, Why Is American Literature Bourgeois? in the North American Review, Atherton critiqued William Dean Howells for the "littleism" or "thin" realism of his fiction. Some say that Atherton's novel, Julia France and Her Times (1912), has a strong feminist subtext, with the titular heroine being a woman needing to earn a living wage. However, its view of gender issues is nuanced: she mentioned "the happy fate of the American woman, who 'had things all her own way,' and to whom man was a slave." (p. 124). She also points out that the Pankhursts' militant brand of suffragism was strongly hated "by the National Union of Woman's Suffrage Societies, and by Society in general." (p. 298).

Atherton is best remembered for her California Series, several novels and short stories dealing with the social history of California. The series includes The Splendid, Idle Forties (1902); The Conqueror (1902), which is a fictionalized biography of Alexander Hamilton; and her sensational, semi-autobiographical novel Black Oxen (1923), about an aging woman who miraculously becomes young again after glandular therapy. The novel names the areas of a woman's power as youth and vitality, examines the social expectations surrounding them, then prompts women to avoid these conventions. The latter was adapted into the film Black Oxen in 1923. Atherton's earlier novel Mrs. Balfame (1916) was also adapted to film, as Mrs. Balfame in 1917. Atherton's The Immortal Marriage (1927) and The Jealous Gods (1928) are historical novels set in Ancient Greece.

Atherton wrote several stories of supernatural horror, including the ghost stories "Death and the Woman", "Crowned with One Crest", "The Foghorn", and the often anthologized "The Striding Place". "The Foghorn", written in 1933, is a psychological horror story that has been compared to "The Yellow Wallpaper". W. Somerset Maugham called it a powerful story in a 1943 publication of his Great Modern Reading.

== Style and themes ==
Atherton was an early feminist well acquainted with the plight of women. She knew "the pain of sexual repression, knew the cost of strength required to escape it (strength some women do not have to spend), knew its scars—the scars that made her wary of emotional commitment and relegated her, despite her professional triumphs and her surpassing benefit to women, to largely an observer role in human relations. She knew the full cost of the destructive battle of the sexes, and urged that it end at last with true sexual equality." Her novels often feature strong heroines who pursue independent lives, undoubtedly a reaction to her stifling married life.

Atherton was often compared to contemporary authors such as Henry James and Edith Wharton (James himself assessed Atherton's work and said she had reduced the typical man/woman relationship to a personality clash).

Atherton presided in her last years over the San Francisco branch of PEN. As her biographer Emily Wortis Leider notes in California's Daughter, however, "under her domination it became little more than a social club that might have been called Friends of Atherton and (Senator) Phelan". A strong advocate of social reform, and the grande dame of California literature, she yet remained a strong force in the promotion of a California cultural identity. She was a personal friend of Senator James Duval Phelan and his nephew, the philanthropist Noel Sullivan, and often was a guest at Phelan's estate, Villa Montalvo. Among her celebrity friends was travel writer Richard Halliburton, who shared her interest in artists' rights, and whose disappearance at sea she lamented. Though she could be offensively assertive with her acerbic wit, notes Gerry Max, she crusaded with determination for many of the key intellectual freedom issues of her day, especially those involving women's rights, and remained, throughout a long creative life, a true friend to writers. In his autobiographical novel, Kenneth Rexroth speaks of her kindness to him and his wife when they arrived in San Francisco in the late 1920s.

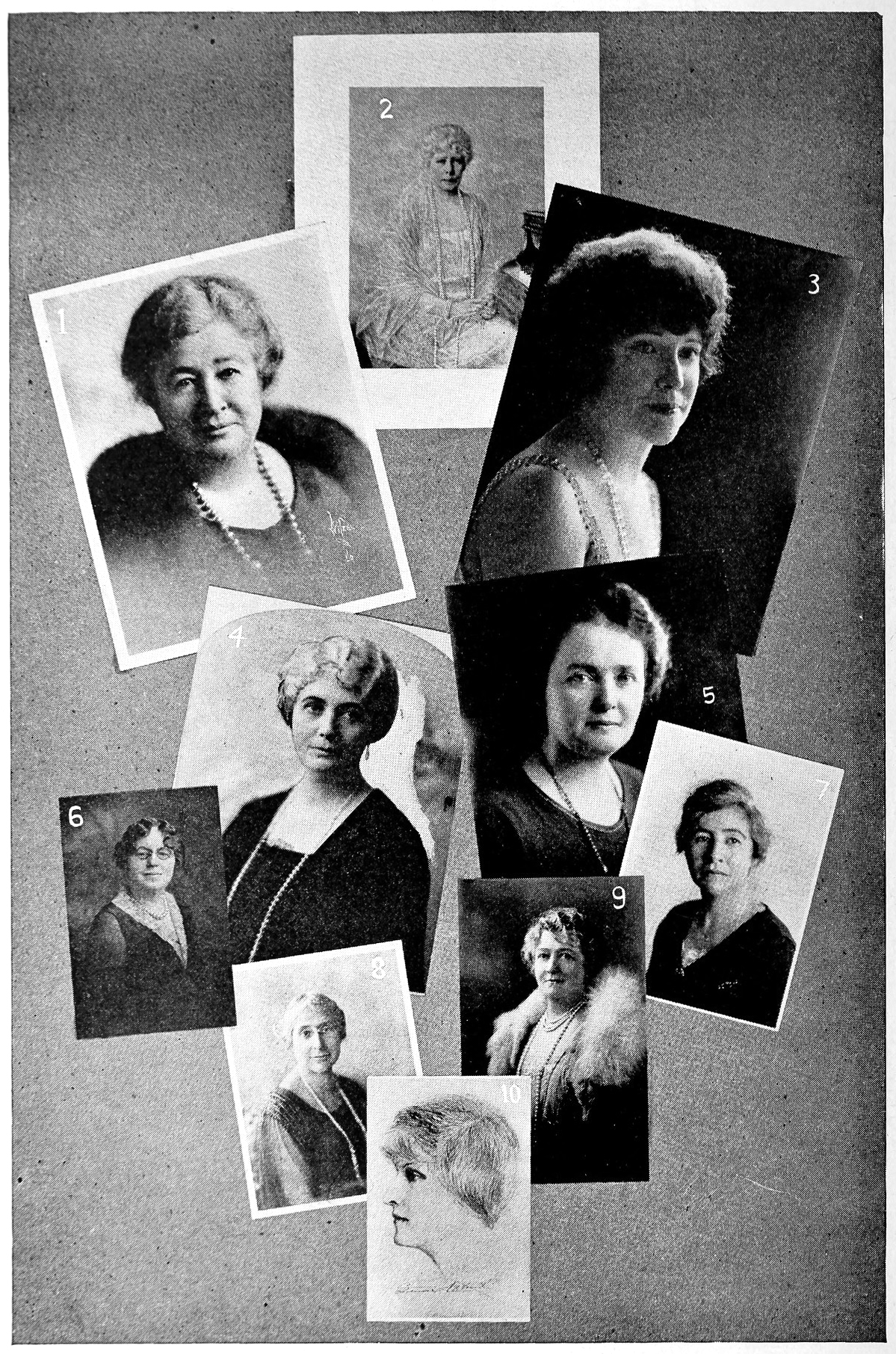
Mariana Bertola, Carrie Jacobs-Bond, May Showler Groves, Minna McGauley, Maud Wilde, Jeanette Lawrence, Miriam Van Waters, Mrs. David Starr Jordan, Annie Florence Brown, Gertrude Atherton

Charlotte S. McClure in a Dictionary of Literary Biography essay said that Atherton "redefined women's potential and presented a psychological drama of a woman's quest for identity and for a life purpose and happiness within and beyond her procreative function". She also said that Patience Sparhawk was Atherton's "first significant novel". In an 1898 essay in Bookman, a critic stated:

"the amazing and memorable Patience Sparhawk may perhaps be referred to as the first foreshadowing of the good work that [Atherton] has done since. It seems to have been also generally conceded that no matter what the subject chanced to be . . . nothing from her pen would be commonplace or dull. [But] that startling performance [in Patience Sparhawk] introduced her to a different audience, one much larger and more seriously interested than she had had before."

Carl van Vechten said of Atherton in a Nation article: "Usually (not always, to be sure), the work of Mrs. Wharton seems to me to be scrupulous, clever and uninspiring, while that of Mrs. Atherton is often careless, sprawling, but inspired. Mrs. Wharton, with some difficulty, it would appear, has learned to write; Mrs. Atherton was born with a facility for telling stories."

In an essay for Bookman, Frederic Taber Cooper stated that in Senator North, the character Harriet "is practically a white woman but for a scarcely perceptible blueness at the base of her fingernails, this character of Harriet is perhaps the best bit of feminine analysis that Mrs. Atherton ever did."

== Political views ==
Atherton was a suffragist who did not believe in the use of militancy to further the cause. In 1917 she wrote a letter to the editor of the New York Times to express her support for suffrage while voicing her opposition to militancy.

Atherton also advocated white supremacy. Atherton's novel Senator North describes a marriage between a "passing" woman of mixed white and African-American ancestry and a white man, which ends in tragedy. Senator North was intended by Atherton as a warning against interracial marriages. In a 1922 The Bookman article, "The Alpine School of Fiction", Atherton praised the book The Passing of the Great Race by Madison Grant, describing it as a "remarkable work, with its warning of tremendous import to civilization". Atherton claimed that American civilization had been created by the "Nordic" or "Anglo-Saxon" race, and that this was now threatened by an influx of "Alpine" and "Mediterranean" immigrants, who Atherton regarded as inferior to Nordics. Atherton argued that "The old Nordic-American stock is being rapidly bred out by the refuse of Europe." Atherton cited works such as Main Street by Sinclair Lewis and Three Soldiers by John Dos Passos as signs of a decline in American literature brought about by the rejection of "Nordic" themes. Atherton's views on race were praised by Thomas Dixon Jr., but strongly criticized by both H. L. Mencken and Horace Kallen.

Following the Russian Revolution, Atherton developed a hostility to Communism. In 1919, Atherton wrote an article for The New York Times, (entitled "Time as a cure for Bolshevism") which condemned both the Russian Soviet Federative Socialist Republic and the Americans who sympathized with it. When asked by the League of American Writers which side she supported in the Spanish Civil War, she stated that she supported the Spanish Nationalists-the only author of the 418 the League surveyed who did. In the League pamphlet Writers Take Sides (collecting the authors' responses), Atherton stated that although she disliked both fascism and communism, she considered communism the greater evil and added, "Although I have no love for Franco, I hope he will mop up the Communists, and send home, with tails between legs, all those gullible Americans who enlisted to save Spanish 'Democracy'". Atherton attended the Democratic National Convention in 1928. In a poll carried out by the Saturday Review of Literature asking writers which Presidential candidate they endorsed in the 1940 election, Atherton was among the writers who endorsed Wendell Willkie.

== Legacy ==
Atherton's autobiography, Adventures of a Novelist (New York: Horace Liveright, 1932), is an account of her life and the people she knew, including Ambrose Bierce and James Phelan. It includes historical reminiscences of San Francisco in the late 19th and early 20th centuries.

She is buried in Cypress Lawn cemetery in Colma, California. In 2009, The Library of America selected Atherton's story "The Striding Place" for inclusion in its two-century retrospective of American Fantastic Tales.

== Selected works ==
=== Literature ===
- What Dreams May Come (1888), as Frank Lin
- Hermia Suydam (1889)
- Los Cerritos, a Romance of the Modern Times (1890)
- A Question of Time (1891)
- The Doomswoman (1893)
- Before the Gringo Came (1894), revised and enlarged as The Splendid Idle Forties: Stories of Old California (1902)
- A Whirl Asunder (1895)
- His Fortunate Grace (1897)
- Patience Sparhawk and Her Times (1897)
- American Wives and English Husbands (1898)
- The Californians (1898)
- The Valiant Runaways (1898)
- A Daughter of the Vine (1899)
- Senator North (1900)
- The Aristocrats (1901)
- The Conqueror, Being the True and Romantic Story of Alexander Hamilton (1902)
- "The Splendid Idle Forties, Stories of Old California" (1902)
- Heart of Hyacinth (1903)
- Mrs. Pendleton's Four-in-Hand (1903)
- Rulers of Kings (1904)
- The Bell in the Fog, and Other Stories (1905)
- The Travelling Thirds (1905)
- Rezanov (1906)
- Ancestors (1907)
- The Gorgeous Isle (1908)
- Tower of Ivory (1910)
- Julia France and Her Times (1912)
- Perch of the Devil (1914)
- California, An Intimate History (1914), revised and enlarged in 1927 and 1971
- Life in the War Zone (1916)
- Mrs. Belfame (1916)
- The Living Present (1917) – Book I: French Women in Wartime; Book II: Feminism in Peace and War
- The White Morning: a Novel of the Power of the German Women in Wartime (1918)
- The Avalanche: A Mystery Story (1919)
- Transplanted (1919)
- The Sisters-in-Law: A Novel of Our Times (1921)
- Sleeping Fires (1922)
- Black Oxen (1923)
- The Crystal Cup (1925)
- The Immortal Marriage (1927)
- The Jealous Gods, A Processional Novel of the Fifth Century B.C. (Concerning One Alcibiades) (1928)
- Dido: Queen of Hearts (1929)
- The Sophisticates (1931)
- Adventures of a Novelist (1932)
- The Story of an Elephant Named Fritz and Teofilo Barla an Italian Cook (1934)
- The Foghorn: Stories (1934)
- California: An Intimate History (1936)
- Golden Peacock (1936)
- Rezánov and Doña Concha (1937)
- Can Women Be Gentlemen? (1938)
- The House of Lee (1940)
- The Horn of Life (1942)
- The Conqueror (1943)
- Golden Gate Country (1945, American Folkways series)
- My San Francisco (1946)

=== Plays ===
- Julia France (1912)

=== Films ===
- The Panther Woman (1918), based on her novel Patience Sparhawk and Her Times
- The Avalanche (1929), based on The Avalanche: A Mystery Story
- Out of the Storm (1920), based on her novel Tower of Ivory
- Don't Neglect Your Wife (1921), screenwriter
- Black Oxen (1924), based on her novel of the same name
- The Crystal Cup (1927), based on her novel of the same name
- Perch of the Devil (1927), based on her novel of the same name

=== Other contributions ===
- The Spinners' Book of Fiction (wrote: Concha Arguëllo, Sister Dominica)(1907), made to help out her friend Ina Coolbrith
- What Is a Book? (1935)
- The Lot, Photoplay, June 1921, p. 92.
