= The Best American Short Stories 1963 =

1963 short story anthology

- Editor: Martha Foley
- Language: English
- Series: The Best American Short Stories
- Publisher: Houghton Mifflin Harcourt
- Media type: Print
- ISBN: 9789997371423
- Preceded by: The Best American Short Stories 1962
- Followed by: The Best American Short Stories 1964

The Best American Short Stories 1963 is a volume in The Best American Short Stories series edited by Martha Foley. The volume was published by Houghton Mifflin Harcourt.

== Background ==
The series is considered one of the "best-known annual anthologies of short fiction" and has anthologized more than 2,000 short stories, including works by some of the most famous writers in contemporary American literature.

In particular, the Willa Cather Review wrote that The Best American Short Stories series "became a repository of values" for creative writing programs, college libraries, and literary magazines. The Los Angeles Times, reflecting on the hundred-year anniversary of the series, noted that it eventually became an "institution" itself, often being taught in classrooms.

== Short stories included ==
Author	Story	Source
U. S. Andersen	"Turn Ever So Quickly"	The Saturday Evening Post
H. W. Blattner	"Sound of a Drunken Drummer"	The Hudson Review
John Stewart Carter	"The Keyhole Eye"	The Kenyon Review
John Cheever	"A Vision of the World"	The New Yorker
Cecil Dawkins	"A Simple Case"	Southwest Review
George Dickerson	"Chico"	Phoenix
May Dikeman	"The Sound of Young Laughter"	The Atlantic Monthly
Stanley Elkin	"I Look Out for Ed Wolfe"	Esquire
Dave Godfrey	"Newfoundland Night"	Tamarack Review
William J. J. Gordon	"The Pures"	The Atlantic Monthly
John Hermann	"Aunt Mary"	Perspective
Katinka Loeser	"Beggarman, Rich Man, or Thief"	McCall's
St. Clair McKelway	"The Fireflies"	The New Yorker
Ursule Molinaro	"The Insufficient Rope"	Prism
Joyce Carol Oates	"The Fine White Mist of Winter"	The Literary Review
R. C. Phelan	"Birds, Clouds, Frogs"	Redhook
Mordecai Richler	"Some Grist for Mervyn's Mill"	The Kenyon Review
William Saroyan	"What a World, Said the Bicycle Rider"	The Saturday Evening Post
Babette Sassoon	"The Betrayal"	New World Writing (New American Library)
Irwin Shaw	"Noises in the City"	Playboy
Peter Taylor	"At the Drugstore"	The Sewanee Review
Niccolò Tucci	"The Desert in the Oasis"	The New Yorker
Jessamyn West	"The Picnickers"	The Kenyon Review
