= The Best American Short Stories 1959 =

1959 short story anthology

- Editor: Martha Foley
- Language: English
- Series: The Best American Short Stories
- Publisher: Houghton Mifflin Harcourt
- Media type: Print
- ISBN: 978-9997371256
- Preceded by: The Best American Short Stories 1958
- Followed by: The Best American Short Stories 1960

The Best American Short Stories 1959 is a volume in The Best American Short Stories series edited by Martha Foley. The volume was published by Houghton Mifflin Harcourt.

== Background ==
The series is considered one of the "best-known annual anthologies of short fiction" and has anthologized more than 2,000 short stories, including works by some of the most famous writers in contemporary American literature.

In particular, the Willa Cather Review wrote that The Best American Short Stories series "became a repository of values" for creative writing programs, college libraries, and literary magazines. The Los Angeles Times, reflecting on the hundred-year anniversary of the series, noted that it eventually became an "institution" itself, often being taught in classrooms.

== Short stories included ==
Author	Story	Source
John Barry	"Jawaharlal and the Three Cadavers"	The Western Review
Sallie Bingham	"Winter Term"	Mademoiselle
Frank Butler	"Amid A Place of Stone"	The Hudson Review
John Cheever	"The Bella Lingua"	The New Yorker
Robert M. Coates	"Getaway"	The New Yorker
Charles G. Finney	"The Iowan’s Curse"	Harper's Magazine
William H. Gass	"Mrs. Mean"	Accent
"Hugh Geeslin, Jr. "	"A Day In The Life of the Boss"	The Georgia Review
Herbert Gold	"Love and Like"	The Hudson Review
Frank Holwerda	"In A Tropical Minor Key"	Accent
Bernard Malamud	"The Last Mohican"	Partisan Review
Howard Nemerov	"A Secret Society"	The Virginia Quarterly Review
Leo Rosten	"The Guy in Ward 4"	Harper's Magazine
Philip Roth	"The Conversion of the Jews"	The Paris Review
Anne Sayre	"A Birthday Present"	The Colorado Quarterly
Harvey Swados	"The Man in the Toolhouse"	The Western Review
Peter Taylor	"Venus, Cupid, Folly and Time"	The Kenyon Review
John Updike	"A Gift From the City"	The New Yorker
Thomas Williams	"The Buck in Trotevale’s"	Esquire
Ethel Wilson	"The Window"	The Tamarack Review
