= The Best American Short Stories 1955 =

1955 short story anthology

- Editor: Martha Foley
- Language: English
- Series: The Best American Short Stories
- Publisher: Houghton Mifflin Harcourt
- Media type: Print
- ISBN: 978-9997371614
- Preceded by: The Best American Short Stories 1954
- Followed by: The Best American Short Stories 1956

The Best American Short Stories 1955 is a volume in The Best American Short Stories series edited by Martha Foley. The volume was published by Houghton Mifflin Harcourt.

== Background ==
The series is considered one of the "best-known annual anthologies of short fiction" and has anthologized more than 2,000 short stories, including works by some of the most famous writers in contemporary American literature.

In particular, the Willa Cather Review wrote that The Best American Short Stories series "became a repository of values" for creative writing programs, college libraries, and literary magazines. The Los Angeles Times, reflecting on the hundred-year anniversary of the series, noted that it eventually became an "institution" itself, often being taught in classrooms.

== Short stories included ==
Author	Story	Source
Robert O. Bowen	"A Matter of Price"	Prairie Schooner
Nancy Cardozo	"The Excursionists"	Mademoiselle
Nancy G. Chaikin	"Bachelor of Arts"	The University of Kansas City Review
John Cheever	"The Country Husband"	The New Yorker
Evan S. Connell Jr.	"The Fisherman From Chihuahua"	The Paris Review
Joe Coogan	"The Decline And Fall of Augie Sheean"	The Ladies' Home Journal
Daniel Curley	"The Day of the Equinox"	New Mexico Quarterly
William Eastlake	"Little Joe"	Accent
George P. Elliot	"Brother Quintillan and Dick The Chemist"	Western Review
Mac Hyman	"The Hundredth Centennial"	The Paris Review
Oliver La Farge	"The Resting Place"	The New Yorker
Bernard Malamud	"The Magic Barrel"	Partisan Review
Judith Merril	"Dead Center"	Fantasy & Science Fiction
Elizabeth H. Middleton	"Portrait of My Son As A Young Man"	The University of Kansas City Review
Marvin Mudrick	"The Professor and the Poet"	Shenandoah
Howard Nemerov	"Yore"	The Hudson Review
Flannery O'Connor	"A Circle In The Fire"	The Kenyon Review
Irwin Shaw	"Tip On A Dead Jockey"	The New Yorker
Wallace Stegner	"Maiden In A Tower"	Harper's Magazine
David Stuart	"Bird Man"	Botteghe Oscure
Harvey Swados	"Herman's Day"	New World Writing
Mark Van Doren	"I Got a Friend"	The University of Kansas City Review
George Vukelich	"The Scale Room"	The Atlantic Monthly
Eudora Welty	"Going To Naples"	Harper's Bazaar
