= The Best American Short Stories 1966 =

1966 short story anthology

- Editor: Martha Foley
- Language: English
- Series: The Best American Short Stories
- Publisher: Houghton Mifflin Harcourt
- Media type: Print
- ISBN: 978-9997371492
- Preceded by: The Best American Short Stories 1965
- Followed by: The Best American Short Stories 1967

The Best American Short Stories 1966 is a volume in The Best American Short Stories series edited by Martha Foley. The volume was published by Houghton Mifflin Harcourt.

== Background ==
The series is considered one of the "best-known annual anthologies of short fiction" and has anthologized more than 2,000 short stories, including works by some of the most famous writers in contemporary American literature.

In particular, the Willa Cather Review wrote that The Best American Short Stories series "became a repository of values" for creative writing programs, college libraries, and literary magazines. The Los Angeles Times, reflecting on the hundred-year anniversary of the series, noted that it eventually became an "institution" itself, often being taught in classrooms.

== Short stories included ==
Author	Story	Source	
1966	Jack Cady	"The Burning"	The Atlantic Monthly
1966	George Dickerson	"A Mussel Named Ecclesiastes"	Rogue
1966	Harris Downey	"The Vicar-General and the Wide Night"	The Southern Review
1966	David Ely	"The Academy"	Playboy
1966	William Faulkner	"Mr. Acarius "	The Saturday Evening Post
1966	Shirley Ann Grau	"The Beach Party"	Redbook
1966	Mary Hedin	"Places We Lost"	McCall’s Magazine
1966	Hugh Hood	"Getting to Williamstown"	The Tamarack Review
1966	Shirley Jackson	"The Bus"	The Saturday Evening Post
1966	Josephine Jacobsen	"On the Island"	The Kenyon Review
1966	Henry Kreisel	"The Broken Globe"	The Literary Review
1966	Mary Lavin	"One Summer"	The New Yorker
1966	Curt Leviant	"Mourning Call"	The Quarterly Review of Literature
1966	William Maxwell	"Further Tales About Men and Women"	The New Yorker
1966	Flannery O'Connor	"Parker's Back"	Esquire
1966	Walter S. Terry	"The Bottomless Well"	The Georgia Review
1966	Dan Wakefield	"Autumn Full of Apples"	Redbook
1966	Joseph Whitehill	"One Night for Several Samurai"	The Hudson Review
1966	Herbert Wilner	"Dovisch in the Wilderness"	The Saturday Evening Post
