= The Best American Short Stories 1961 =

1961 short story anthology

- Editor: Martha Foley
- Language: English
- Series: The Best American Short Stories
- Publisher: Houghton Mifflin Harcourt
- Media type: Print
- ISBN: 9789997371331
- Preceded by: The Best American Short Stories 1960
- Followed by: The Best American Short Stories 1962

The Best American Short Stories 1961 is a volume in The Best American Short Stories series edited by Martha Foley. The volume was published by Houghton Mifflin Harcourt.

== Background ==
The series is considered one of the "best-known annual anthologies of short fiction" and has anthologized more than 2,000 short stories, including works by some of the most famous writers in contemporary American literature.

In particular, the Willa Cather Review wrote that The Best American Short Stories series "became a repository of values" for creative writing programs, college libraries, and literary magazines. The Los Angeles Times, reflecting on the hundred-year anniversary of the series, noted that it eventually became an "institution" itself, often being taught in classrooms.

== Short stories included ==
Author	Story	Source
James Baldwin	"This Morning, This Evening, So Soon"	The Atlantic Monthly
John Barry	"The Listener"	New World Writing (New American Library)
Alfred Chester	"Berceuse"	Esquire
W. H. Gass	"The Love and Sorrow of Henry Pimber"	Accent
Ivan Gold	"The Nickel Misery of George Washington Carver Brown"	Esquire
William Goyen	"A Tale of Inheritance"	Southwest Review
Mark Harris	"The Self-Made Brain Surgeon"	The Noble Savage
Kaatje Hurlbut	"The Vestibule"	The Literary Review
Theodore Jacobs	"A Girl for Walter"	Mutiny
Mary Lavin	"The Yellow Beret"	The New Yorker
Jack Ludwig	"Confusions"	The Tamarack Review
Willard Marsh	"Mexican Hayride"	Esquire
St. Clair McKelway	"First Marriage"	The New Yorker
Jeannie Olive	"Society"	The University of Kansas City Review
Tillie Olsen	"Tell Me a Riddle"	New World Writing (New American Library)
William Peden	"Night in Funland"	New Mexico Quarterly
Thomas Pynchon	"Entropy"	The Kenyon Review
Samuel Sandmel	"The Colleagues of Mr. Chips"	Prairie Schooner
Peter Taylor	"Miss Leonora When Last Seen"	The New Yorker
Ellington White	"The Perils of Flight"	The Georgia Review
