= The Best American Short Stories 1964 =

1964 short story anthology

- Editor: Martha Foley
- Language: English
- Series: The Best American Short Stories
- Publisher: Houghton Mifflin Harcourt
- Media type: Print
- ISBN: 978-0395076880
- Preceded by: The Best American Short Stories 1963
- Followed by: The Best American Short Stories 1965

The Best American Short Stories 1964 is a volume in The Best American Short Stories series edited by Martha Foley. The volume was published by Houghton Mifflin Harcourt.

== Background ==
The series is considered one of the "best-known annual anthologies of short fiction" and has anthologized more than 2,000 short stories, including works by some of the most famous writers in contemporary American literature.

In particular, the Willa Cather Review wrote that The Best American Short Stories series "became a repository of values" for creative writing programs, college libraries, and literary magazines. The Los Angeles Times, reflecting on the hundred-year anniversary of the series, noted that it eventually became an "institution" itself, often being taught in classrooms.

== Short stories included ==
Author	Story	Source
Frieda Arkin	"The Broomstick on the Porch"	The Kenyon Review
Richard G. Brown	"Mr. Iscariot"	The Literary Review
John Stewart Carter	"To a Tenor Dying Old"	The Kenyon Review
Daniel Curley	"A Story of Love, Etc."	Epoch
May Dikeman	"The Woman Across the Street"	The Atlantic Monthly
William Eastlake	"A Long Day's Dying"	Virginia Quarterly Review
William Goyen	"Figure Over the Town"	The Saturday Evening Post
Paul Horgan	"Black Snowflakes"	The Saturday Evening Post
William Humphrey	"The Pump"	Esquire
Shirley Jackson	"Birthday Party"	Vogue
Edith Konecky	"The Power"	The Massachusetts Review
Kimon Lolos	"Mule No. 095"	The Carleton Miscellany
Bernard Malamud	"The German Refugee"	The Saturday Evening Post
Carson McCullers	"Sucker"	The Saturday Evening Post
Virginia Moriconi	"Simple Arithmetic"	The Transatlantic Review
Joyce Carol Oates	"Upon the Sweeping Flood"	Southwest Review
Reynolds Price	"The Names and Faces of Heroes"	Shenandoah
Vera Randal	"Waiting for Jim"	The Colorado Quarterly
Harvey Swados	"A Story for Teddy"	The Saturday Evening Post
Robert Penn Warren	"Have You Seen Sukie?"	The Virginia Quarterly Review
