= The Best American Short Stories 1952 =

1952 short story anthology

- Editor: Martha Foley
- Language: English
- Series: The Best American Short Stories
- Publisher: Houghton Mifflin Harcourt
- Media type: Print
- ISBN: 978-9997371546
- Preceded by: The Best American Short Stories 1951
- Followed by: The Best American Short Stories 1953

The Best American Short Stories 1952 is a volume in The Best American Short Stories series edited by Martha Foley. The volume was published by Houghton Mifflin Harcourt.

== Background ==
The series is considered one of the "best-known annual anthologies of short fiction" and has anthologized more than 2,000 short stories, including works by some of the most famous writers in contemporary American literature.

In particular, the Willa Cather Review wrote that The Best American Short Stories series "became a repository of values" for creative writing programs, college libraries, and literary magazines. The Los Angeles Times, reflecting on the hundred-year anniversary of the series, noted that it eventually became an "institution" itself, often being taught in classrooms.

== Short stories included ==
| Author | Story | Source |
|---|---|---|
| Bill Berge | "That Lovely Green Boat" | Furioso |
| Robert O. Bowen | "The Other River" | Western Review |
| Kay Boyle | "The Lost" | Tomorrow |
| Ray Bradbury | "The Other Foot" | New-Story |
| Hortense Calisher | "A Wreath For Miss Totten" | Mademoiselle |
| Nancy Cardozo | "The Unborn Ghosts" | The New Yorker |
| Nancy G. Chaikin | "The Climate of the Family" | Mademoiselle |
| Ann Chidester | "Wood Smoke" | Harper's Bazaar |
| Charles Edward Eaton | "The Motion Of Forgetfulness Is Slow" | Epoch |
| George P. Elliot | "Children of Ruth" | The Hudson Review |
| Elizabeth Enright | "The First Face" | The New Yorker |
| Hugh Garner | "The Conversion of Willie Heaps" | The Northern Review |
| Martha Gellhorn | "Weekend At Grimsby" | The Atlantic Monthly |
| Emilie Glen | "Always Good For A Belly Laugh" | Prairie Schooner |
| Nancy Hale | "Brahmin Beachhead" | Town and Country |
| Philip Horton | "What's In A Corner" | New Mexico Quarterly |
| Susan Kuehn | "The Searchers " | Harper's Magazine |
| Bethel Laurence | "The Call" | Today's Woman |
| Frank Rooney | "Cyclists' Raid" | Harper's Magazine |
| William Saroyan | "Palo" | Tomorrow |
| Stuart Schulberg | "I'm Really Fine" | New-Story |
| Jean Stafford | "The Healthiest Girl In Town" | The New Yorker |
| Wallace Stegner | "The Traveler" | Harper's Magazine |
| James Still | "A Ride On The Short Dog" | The Atlantic Monthly |
| Harvey Swados | "The Letters" | The Hudson Review |
| Mark Van Doren | "Nobody Say A Word" | Harper's Magazine |
| Daniel Waldron | "Evensong" | New-Story |
| Christine Weston | "Loud Sing Cuckoo" | Mademoiselle |
| Hisaye Yamamoto | "Yoneko's Earthquake" | Furioso |
