= The Best American Short Stories 1965 =

1965 short story anthology

- Editor: Martha Foley
- Language: English
- Series: The Best American Short Stories
- Publisher: Houghton Mifflin Harcourt
- Media type: Print
- ISBN: 978-9997371454
- Preceded by: The Best American Short Stories 1964
- Followed by: The Best American Short Stories 1966

The Best American Short Stories 1965 is a volume in The Best American Short Stories series edited by Martha Foley. The volume was published by Houghton Mifflin Harcourt.

== Background ==
The series is considered one of the "best-known annual anthologies of short fiction" and has anthologized more than 2,000 short stories, including works by some of the most famous writers in contemporary American literature.

In particular, the Willa Cather Review wrote that The Best American Short Stories series "became a repository of values" for creative writing programs, college libraries, and literary magazines. The Los Angeles Times, reflecting on the hundred-year anniversary of the series, noted that it eventually became an "institution" itself, often being taught in classrooms.

== Short stories included ==
Author	Story	Source
L.J. Amster	"Center of Gravity"	The Saturday Evening Post
Daniel De Paola	"The Returning"	Prairie Schooner
Stanley Elkin	"The Transient"	The Saturday Evening Post
Jack Gilchrist	"Opening Day"	The Georgia Review
James W. Groshong	"The Gesture"	The Antioch Review
Martin J. Hamer	"Sarah"	The Atlantic Monthly
Maureen Howard	"Sherry"	The Hudson Review
Donald Hutter	"A Family Man"	The Saturday Evening Post
Henia Karmel-Wolfe	"The Month of His Birthday"	Mademoiselle
Mary Lavin	"Heart of Gold"	The New Yorker
Dennis Lynds	"A Blue Blonde in the Sky over Pennsylvania"	The Hudson Review
Frederic Morton	"The Guest"	The Hudson Review
Jay Neugeboren	"The Application"	The Transatlantic Review
Joyce Carol Oates	"First Views of the Enemy"	Prairie Schooner
Leonard Wallace Robinson	"The Practice of about Art"	The Saturday Evening Post
Isaac Bashevis Singer	"A Sacrifice"	Harper's Magazine
Abraham Rothberg	"Pluto is the Furthest Planet"	The Yale Review
Robert Somerlott	"Eskimo Pies"	The Atlantic Monthly
Elizabeth Spencer	"The Visit"	Prairie Schooner
Jean Stafford	"The Tea Time of Stouthearted Ladies"	The Kenyon Review
Gerald Stein	"For I Have Wept"	The Saturday Evening Post
Peter Taylor	"There"	The Kenyon Review
Lee Yu-Hwa	"The Last Rite"	The Literary Review
