= The Best American Short Stories 1958 =

1958 short story anthology

- Editor: Martha Foley
- Language: English
- Series: The Best American Short Stories
- Publisher: Houghton Mifflin Harcourt
- Media type: Print
- ISBN: 978-9997371676
- Preceded by: The Best American Short Stories 1957
- Followed by: The Best American Short Stories 1959

The Best American Short Stories 1958 is a volume in The Best American Short Stories series edited by Martha Foley. The volume was published by Houghton Mifflin Harcourt.

== Background ==
The series is considered one of the "best-known annual anthologies of short fiction" and has anthologized more than 2,000 short stories, including works by some of the most famous writers in contemporary American literature.

In particular, the Willa Cather Review wrote that The Best American Short Stories series "became a repository of values" for creative writing programs, college libraries, and literary magazines. The Los Angeles Times, reflecting on the hundred-year anniversary of the series, noted that it eventually became an "institution" itself, often being taught in classrooms.

== Short stories included ==
Author	Story	Source
James Agee	"The Waiting"	The New Yorker
James Baldwin	"Sonny’s Blues"	Partisan Review
Paul Bowles	"The Frozen Fields"	Harper's Bazaar
Ray Bradbury	"The Day It Rained Forever"	Harper's Magazine
George Bradshaw	"The Picture Wouldn’t Fit In The Stove'"	Vogue
Alfred Chester	"As I Was Going Up the Stair"	The Sewanee Review
Shirley Ann Grau	"Hunter’s Home"	Mademoiselle
Pati Hill	"Ben"	The Paris Review
Robie Macauley	"Legend of Two Swimmers"	The Kenyon Review
Jean McCord	"Somewhere Out of Nowhere"	Quixote
Howard Nemerov	"A Delayed Hearing"	The Kenyon Review
Flannery O'Connor	"A View of the Woods"	Partisan Review
Anthony Ostroff	"La Bataille Des Fleurs "	The Kenyon Review
Dorothy Parker	"The Banquet Of Crow"	The New Yorker
Ralph Robin	"Mr. Pruitt"	Prairie Schooner
Jean Stafford	"A Reasonable Facsimile"	The New Yorker
Harvey Swados	"Joe, The Vanishing American"	The Hudson Review
Richard Thurman	"Not Another Word"	The New Yorker
Bob Van Scoyk	"Home From Camp"	Ellery Queen's Mystery Magazine
Robin White	"House of Many Rooms"	Harper's Magazine
Richard Wright	"Big, Black, Good Man"	Esquire
