= The Best American Short Stories 1957 =

1957 short story anthology

- Title page for The Best American Short Stories 1957
- Editor: Martha Foley
- Language: English
- Series: The Best American Short Stories
- Publisher: Houghton Mifflin Harcourt
- Media type: Print
- ISBN: 978-9997371652
- Preceded by: The Best American Short Stories 1956
- Followed by: The Best American Short Stories 1958

The Best American Short Stories 1957 is a volume in The Best American Short Stories series edited by Martha Foley. The volume was published by Houghton Mifflin Harcourt.

== Background ==
The series is considered one of the "best-known annual anthologies of short fiction" and has anthologized more than 2,000 short stories, including works by some of the most famous writers in contemporary American literature.

In particular, the Willa Cather Review wrote that The Best American Short Stories series "became a repository of values" for creative writing programs, college libraries, and literary magazines. The Los Angeles Times, reflecting on the hundred-year anniversary of the series, noted that it eventually became an "institution" itself, often being taught in classrooms.

== Short stories included ==
Author	Story	Source
Nelson Algren	"Beasts of the Wild"	New World Writing
Gina Berriault	"Around the Dear Ruin"	The Paris Review
Doris Betts	"The Proud and Virtuous"	Mademoiselle
Frank Butler	"To The Wilderness I Wander"	The Hudson Review
Wyatt Rainey Blassingame	"Man’s Courage"	Harper's Magazine
Walter Clemons	"The Dark Roots of the Rose"	Harper's Bazaar
Evan S. Connell Jr.	"Arcturus"	Western Review
Harris Downey	"The Song"	Prairie Schooner
William Eastlake	"The Unhappy Hunting Grounds"	The Hudson Review
Nancy Hale	"A Summer’s Long Dream"	The New Yorker
John Langdon	"The Blue Serge Suit"	The Paris Review
Thomas Mabry	"Lula Borrow"	The Sewanee Review
Winona McClintic	"A Heart of Furious Fancies"	The Atlantic Monthly
Tillie Olsen	"I Stand Here Ironing"	The Pacific Spectator
Anthony Robinson	"The Farlow Express"	Prairie Schooner
Rosanne Smith Robinson	"The Impossible He"	Quixote
John Campbell Smith	"Run, Run Away, Brother"	The Yale Review
Henrietta Weigel	"Saturday Is A Poor Man’s Port"	Quixote
Gordon Woodward	"Escape to the City"	Maclean’s Magazine
