= The Best American Short Stories 1967 =

1967 short story anthology

- Editor: Martha Foley
- Language: English
- Series: The Best American Short Stories
- Publisher: Houghton Mifflin Harcourt
- Media type: Print
- ISBN: 978-9997371539
- Preceded by: The Best American Short Stories 1966
- Followed by: The Best American Short Stories 1968

The Best American Short Stories 1967 is a volume in The Best American Short Stories series edited by Martha Foley. The volume was published by Houghton Mifflin Harcourt.

== Background ==
The series is considered one of the "best-known annual anthologies of short fiction" and has anthologized more than 2,000 short stories, including works by some of the most famous writers in contemporary American literature.

In particular, the Willa Cather Review wrote that The Best American Short Stories series "became a repository of values" for creative writing programs, college libraries, and literary magazines. The Los Angeles Times, reflecting on the hundred-year anniversary of the series, noted that it eventually became an "institution" itself, often being taught in classrooms.

== Short stories included ==
Author	Story	Source
Ethan Ayer	"The Promise of Heat"	The New Yorker
George Blake	"A Place Not on the Map"	The Literary Review
Kay Boyle	"The Wild Horses"	The Saturday Evening Post
Raymond Carver	"Will You Please Be Quiet, Please?"	December
H. E. Francis	"One of the Boys"	The Southwest Review
MacDonald Harris	"Trepleff "	Harper's Magazine
Robert Hazel	"White Anglo-Saxon Protestant"	The Hudson Review
Hugh Allyn Hunt	"Acme Rooms and Sweet Majorie Russell"	The Transatlantic Review
Lawrence Lee	"The Heroic Journey"	The Michigan Quarterly Review
Arthur Miller	"Search for a Future"	The Saturday Evening Post
Brian Moore	"The Apartment Hunter"	The Tamarack Review
Berry Morgan	"Andrew"	The New Yorker
Joyce Carol Oates	"Where Are You Going, Where Have You Been??"	Epoch
Donald Radcliffe	"Song of the Simidor"	The Literary Review
Henry Roth	"The Surveyor"	The New Yorker
David Rubin	"Longing For America"	The Virginia Quarterly Review
Jesse Stuart	"The Accident"	The Saturday Evening Post
Carol Sturm	"The Kid Who Fractioned"	Prairie Schooner
Robert Travers	"The Big Brown Trout"	Argosy
William Wiser	"House of the Blues"	The Kenyon Review
