= The Best American Short Stories 1960 =

1960 short story anthology

- Editor: Martha Foley
- Language: English
- Series: The Best American Short Stories
- Publisher: Houghton Mifflin Harcourt
- Media type: Print
- ISBN: 978-9997371287
- Preceded by: The Best American Short Stories 1959
- Followed by: The Best American Short Stories 1961

The Best American Short Stories 1960 is a volume in The Best American Short Stories series edited by Martha Foley. The volume was published by Houghton Mifflin Harcourt.

== Background ==
The series is considered one of the "best-known annual anthologies of short fiction" and has anthologized more than 2,000 short stories, including works by some of the most famous writers in contemporary American literature.

In particular, the Willa Cather Review wrote that The Best American Short Stories series "became a repository of values" for creative writing programs, college libraries, and literary magazines. The Los Angeles Times, reflecting on the hundred-year anniversary of the series, noted that it eventually became an "institution" itself, often being taught in classrooms.

== Short stories included ==
Author	Story	Source
Sanora Babb	"The Santa Ana"	The Saturday Evening Post
Stanley Ellin	"The Day of the Bullet"	Ellery Queen's Mystery Magazine
George P. Elliot	"Words Words Words"	The Hudson Review
Howard Fast	"The Man Who Looked Like Jesus"	Esquire
Mavis Gallant	"August"	The New Yorker
George Garrett	"An Evening Performance"	Mademoiselle
John Graves	"The Last Running"	The Atlantic Monthly
Lawrence Sargent Hall	"The Ledge"	The Hudson Review
Elizabeth Hardwick	"The Purchase"	The New Yorker
Lachlan MacDonald	"The Hunter"	Coastlines
Bernard Malamud	"The Maid's Shoes"	Partisan Review
Arthur Miller	"I Don't Need You Anymore"	Esquire
Howard Nemerov	"Unbelievable Characters"	Esquire
Phyllis Roberts	"Hero"	The Virginia Quarterly Review
Philip Roth	"Defender of the Faith"	The New Yorker
Theodore Sturgeon	"The Man Who Lost the Sea"	The Magazine of Fantasy & Science Fiction
Harvey Swados	"A Glance in the Mirror"	The Hudson Review
Peter Taylor	"Who Was Jesse's Friend and Protector?"	The Kenyon Review
Elisabeth Larsh Young	"Counterclockwise"	Quixote
