= The Best American Short Stories 1950 =

1950 short story anthology

- Editor: Martha Foley
- Language: English
- Series: The Best American Short Stories
- Publisher: Houghton Mifflin Harcourt
- Media type: Print
- ISBN: 978-9997371478
- Preceded by: The Best American Short Stories 1949
- Followed by: The Best American Short Stories 1951

The Best American Short Stories 1950 is a volume in The Best American Short Stories series edited by Martha Foley. The volume was published by Houghton Mifflin Harcourt.

== Background ==
The series is considered one of the "best-known annual anthologies of short fiction" and has anthologized more than 2,000 short stories, including works by some of the most famous writers in contemporary American literature.

In particular, the Willa Cather Review wrote that The Best American Short Stories series "became a repository of values" for creative writing programs, college libraries, and literary magazines. The Los Angeles Times, reflecting on the hundred-year anniversary of the series, noted that it eventually became an "institution" itself, often being taught in classrooms.

== Short stories included ==
Author	Story	Source
Charles Angoff	"Where Did Yesterday Go?"	The University of Kansas City Review
James Aswell	"Shadow of Evil"	Today's Woman
Sanora Babb	"The Wild Flower"	The Kansas Magazine
Warren Beck	"Edge of Doom"	The Virginia Quarterly Review
Saul Bellow	"A Sermon By Doctor Pep"	Partisan Review
Peggy Bennett	"Death Under Hawthornes"	Harper's Bazaar
Paul Bowles	"Pastor Dowe At Tacate"	Mademoiselle
Robert Christopher	"Jishin"	The Yale Review
George P. Elliot	"The NRACP"	The Hudson Review
Leslie A. Fiedler	"The Fear of Innocence"	Partisan Review
Ralph Gustafon	"The Pigeon"	The Northern Review
Marianne Hauser	"The Mouse"	The Tiger's Eye
Josephine W. Johnson	"The Author"	The Virginia Quarterly Review
Ralph Kaplan	"The Artist"	Harper's Magazine
Sylvan Karchmer	"Hail, Brother And Farewell"	Epoch
Speed Lamkin	"Comes A Day"	Mademoiselle
Victoria Lincoln	"The Glass Wall"	Good Housekeeping
Howard Maier	"The World Outside"	Harper's Magazine
Esther McCoy	"The Cape"	Harper's Bazaar
Edward Newhouse	"My Brother's Second Funeral"	The New Yorker
Hoke Norris	"Take Her Up Tenderly"	Prairie Schooner
Glidden Parker	"Bright And Morning"	The Kenyon Review
Clay Putman	"The Old Acrobat and the Ruined City"	Tomorrow
Abraham Rothberg	"Not With Our Fathers"	The University of Kansas City Review
Ramona Stewart	"The Promise"	The American Mercury
James Still	"A Master Time"	The Atlantic Monthly
Joan Strong	"The Hired Man"	American Letters
Peter Taylor	"A Wife of Nashville"	The New Yorker
