= The Best American Short Stories 1968 =

1968 short story anthology

- Editor: Martha Foley
- Language: English
- Series: The Best American Short Stories
- Publisher: Houghton Mifflin Harcourt
- Media type: Print
- ISBN: 978-0395076927
- Preceded by: The Best American Short Stories 1967
- Followed by: The Best American Short Stories 1969

The Best American Short Stories 1968 is a volume in The Best American Short Stories series edited by Martha Foley. The volume was published by Houghton Mifflin Harcourt.

== Background ==
The series is considered one of the "best-known annual anthologies of short fiction" and has anthologized more than 2,000 short stories, including works by some of the most famous writers in contemporary American literature.

In particular, the Willa Cather Review wrote that The Best American Short Stories series "became a repository of values" for creative writing programs, college libraries, and literary magazines. The Los Angeles Times, reflecting on the hundred-year anniversary of the series, noted that it eventually became an "institution" itself, often being taught in classrooms.

== Short stories included ==
Author	Story	Source
James Baldwin	"Tell Me How Long the Trains Been Gone"	McCall’s Magazine
John Deck	"Greased Samba"	The Atlantic
James T. Farrell	"An American Student in Paris"	The Southern Review
George H. Freitag	"An Old Man and His Hat"	Harper's Magazine
Herb Gardner	"Who Is Harry Kellerman and Why Is He Saying Those Terrible Things About Me?"	The Saturday Evening Post
William H. Gass	"In the Heart of the Heart of the Country"	The New American Review
Mary Ladd Gavell	"The Rotifer"	Psychiatry
Donald Gropman	"The Heart of This or That Man"	The Literary Review
William Harrison	"The Snooker Shark"	The Saturday Evening Post
Judith Higgins	"The Only People"	The Atlantic
Helen Hudson	"The Tenant"	The Virginia Quarterly Review
Leo E. Litwak	"In Shock"	Partisan Review
Richard McKenna	"The Sons of Martha"	Harper's Magazine
William Moseley	"The Preacher and Margery Scott"	The Virginia Quarterly Review
Joanna Ostrow	"Celtic Twilight"	The New Yorker
Nancy Huddleston Packer	"Early Morning, Lonely Ride"	The Southwest Review
John Phillips	"Bleat Blodgette"	The Paris Review
Lawrence P. Spingarn	"The Ambassador"	The Southern Humanities Review
Winston Weathers	"The Games That We Played"	The Georgia Review
Janet Bruce Winn	"Dried Rose Petals in a Silver Bowl"	Evidence
