= The Best American Short Stories 1956 =

1956 short story anthology

- Editor: Martha Foley
- Language: English
- Series: The Best American Short Stories
- Publisher: Houghton Mifflin Harcourt
- Media type: Print
- ISBN: 978-9997371638
- Preceded by: The Best American Short Stories 1955
- Followed by: The Best American Short Stories 1957

The Best American Short Stories 1956 is a volume in The Best American Short Stories series edited by Martha Foley. The volume was published by Houghton Mifflin Harcourt.

== Background ==
The series is considered one of the "best-known annual anthologies of short fiction" and has anthologized more than 2,000 short stories, including works by some of the most famous writers in contemporary American literature.

In particular, the Willa Cather Review wrote that The Best American Short Stories series "became a repository of values" for creative writing programs, college libraries, and literary magazines. The Los Angeles Times, reflecting on the hundred-year anniversary of the series, noted that it eventually became an "institution" itself, often being taught in classrooms.

== Short stories included ==
Author	Story	Source
Roger Angell	"In An Early Winter"	The New Yorker
Morris Brown	"The Snow Owl"	Quixote
George R. Clay	"We’re All Guests"	New World Writing
Robert M. Coates	"In A Foreign City"	The New Yorker
Wesley Ford Davis	"The Undertow"	The Pacific Spectator
Ward Dorrance	"The Devil on a Hot Afternoon"	The Sewanee Review
Harris Downey	"The Hobo"	The Virginia Quarterly Review
William Eastlake	"The Quiet Chimneys"	Harper's Magazine
George P. Elliot	"Is He Dead?"	Epoch
Arthur Granit	"Free The Canaries From Their Cages"	Commentary
Marjorie Anaïs Housepian	"How Levon Dai Was Surrendered To The Edemuses"	The Paris Review
Shirley Jackson	"One Ordinary Day, With Peanuts"	Fantasy and Science Fiction
Jack Kerouac	"The Mexican Girl"	The Paris Review
Flannery O'Connor	"Greenleaf"	The Kenyon Review
Nathaniel LaMar	"Creole Love Song"	The Atlantic Monthly
Augusta Wallace Lyons	"The First Flower"	New Campus Writing
Ruth Branning Molloy	"Twenty Below, At The End of a Lane"	Mademoiselle
Flannery O'Connor	"The Artificial Nigger"	The Kenyon Review
Philip Roth	"The Contest For Aaron Gold"	Epoch
John Shepley	"The Machine"	Quixote
Christine Weston	"Four Annas"	The Virginia Quarterly Review
Samuel Yellen	"Reginald Pomfret Skelton"	The Antioch Review
