= The Best American Short Stories 1953 =

1953 short story anthology

- Editor: Martha Foley
- Language: English
- Series: The Best American Short Stories
- Publisher: Houghton Mifflin Harcourt
- Media type: Print
- ISBN: 978-9997371560
- Preceded by: The Best American Short Stories 1952
- Followed by: The Best American Short Stories 1954

The Best American Short Stories 1953 is a volume in The Best American Short Stories series edited by Martha Foley. The volume was published by Houghton Mifflin Harcourt.

== Background ==
The series is considered one of the "best-known annual anthologies of short fiction" and has anthologized more than 2,000 short stories, including works by some of the most famous writers in contemporary American literature.

In particular, the Willa Cather Review wrote that The Best American Short Stories series "became a repository of values" for creative writing programs, college libraries, and literary magazines. The Los Angeles Times, reflecting on the hundred-year anniversary of the series, noted that it eventually became an "institution" itself, often being taught in classrooms.

== Short stories included ==
Author	Story	Source
James Agee	"A Mother's Tale"	Harper's Bazaar
James Ballard	"A Mountain Summer"	The Hopkins Review
Stephen Becker	"The Town Mouse"	Harper's Magazine
Joseph Carroll	"At Mrs. Farrelly's"	The Atlantic Monthly
R.V. Cassill	"The Life of the Sleeping Beauty"	Accent
Robert M. Coates	"The Need"	The New Yorker
Mary Deasy	"Morning Sun"	The Virginia Quarterly Review
Harris Downey	"Crispin's Way"	Epoch
Osborn Duke	"Struttin' With Some Barbecue"	New World Writing
George P. Elliot	"FAQ'"	The Hudson Review
Wingate Froscher	"A Death in the Family"	Epoch
Vahan Krikorian Gregory	"Athens, Greece, 1942"	The Armenian Review
James B. Hall	"A Spot in History"	Epoch
Charles Tenney Jackson	"The Buffalo Wallow"	The Atlantic Monthly
Roberts Jackson	"Fly Away Home"	Accent
Madison P. Jones, Jr.	"Dog Days"	Perspective
Willard Marsh	"Beachhead in Bohemia"	Southwest Review
Elizabeth Marshall	"The Hill People"	Mademoiselle
Felix Noland	"The Whipping"	McCall's
Constance Pendergast	"The Picnic"	Perspective
Ken Purdy	"Change of Plan"	The Atlantic Monthly
Clay Putman	"Our Vegetable Love"	Furioso
Roger Shattuck	"Workout On The River"	Harper's Magazine
Henry Schultz	"Oreste"	New Mexico Quarterly
Stanley Sultan	"The Fugue Of The Fig Tree"	The Kenyon Review
Mark Van Doren	"Still, Still So"	Park East, the Magazine of New York
Donald Wesley	"A Week of Roses"	The Hopkins Review
Christine Weston	"The Forest of the Night"	The New Yorker
Tennessee Williams	"Three Players of A Summer Game"	The New Yorker
Simon Wincelberg	"The Conqueror"	Harper's Bazaar
