= The Best American Short Stories 1954 =

1954 short story anthology

- Editor: Martha Foley
- Language: English
- Series: The Best American Short Stories
- Publisher: Houghton Mifflin Harcourt
- Media type: Print
- ISBN: 978-9997371591
- Preceded by: The Best American Short Stories 1953
- Followed by: The Best American Short Stories 1955

The Best American Short Stories 1954 is a volume in The Best American Short Stories series edited by Martha Foley. The volume was published by Houghton Mifflin Harcourt.

== Background ==
The series is considered one of the "best-known annual anthologies of short fiction" and has anthologized more than 2,000 short stories, including works by some of the most famous writers in contemporary American literature.

In particular, the Willa Cather Review wrote that The Best American Short Stories series "became a repository of values" for creative writing programs, college libraries, and literary magazines. The Los Angeles Times, reflecting on the hundred-year anniversary of the series, noted that it eventually became an "institution" itself, often being taught in classrooms.

== Short stories included ==
Author	Story	Source
Geoffrey Bush	"A Great Reckoning In a Little Room"	The Atlantic Monthly
Richard Clay	"A Beautiful Night For Orion"	The Hudson Review
Benjamin Demott	"The Sense That In The Scene Delights"	Partisan Review
Ward Dorrance	"A Stop on the Way to Texas"	The Atlantic Monthly
Legarde S. Doughty	"The Firebird"	Prairie Schooner
Elizabeth Enright	"Apple Seed and Apple Thorn"	Mademoiselle
Steve Frazee	"My Brother Down There"	Ellery Queen Mystery Magazine
Ivan Gold	"A Change of Air"	New World Writing
Priscilla Heath	"Farewell, Sweet Love"	Western Review
Anne Herbert	"The House On The Esplanade"	Queen's Quarterly
Frank Holwerda	"Char On Raven's Bench"	Accent
Randall Jarrell	"Gertrude and Sidney"	The Sewanee Review
Almet Jenks	"No Way Down"	The Saturday Evening Post
George Loveridge	"The Latter End"	The Yale Review
Frances Gray Patton	"The Game"	The New Yorker
Robert Payne	"The Red Mountain"	Harper's Magazine
Rosanne Smith Robinson	"The Mango Tree"	Harper's Bazaar
Irwin Shaw	"In The French Style"	The New Yorker
Jean Stafford	"The Shorn Lamb"	The New Yorker
Kathrine Taylor	"The Pale Green Fishes"	Woman's Day
B. Traven	"The Third Guest"	Fantastic
Christine Weston	"The Man In Gray"	The Virginia Quarterly Review
Ira Wolfert	"The Indomitable Blue"	Esquire
Vurrell Yentzen	"The Rock"	Quarto
