= The Best American Short Stories 1987 =

1991 short story collection

- Editor: Shannon Ravenel and Ann Beattie
- Language: English
- Series: The Best American Short Stories
- Published: 1987
- Publisher: Houghton Mifflin Harcourt
- Media type: Print (hardback & paperback)
- Pages: 334
- ISBN: 0395413419
- Preceded by: The Best American Short Stories 1986
- Followed by: The Best American Short Stories 1988

First edition (publ. Houghton Mifflin)

The Best American Short Stories 1987, a volume in The Best American Short Stories series, was edited by guest editor Ann Beattie with Shannon Ravenel.

== Short stories included ==
Author	Story	Source
Susan Sontag	"The Way We Live Now"	The New Yorker
John Updike	"The Afterlife"	The New Yorker
Craig Nova	"The Prince"	Esquire
Elizabeth Tallent	"Favor"	The New Yorker
Mavis Gallant	"Kingdom Come"	The New Yorker
Sue Miller	"The Lover of Women"	Mademoiselle
Madison Smartt Bell	"The Lie Detector"	The Crescent Review
Alice Munro	"Circle of Prayer"	The Paris Review
Lee K. Abbott	"Dreams of Distant Lives"	Harper's
Ralph Lombreglia	"Men under Water"	The Atlantic
Raymond Carver	"Boxes"	The New Yorker
Bharati Mukherjee	"The Tenant"	The Literary Review
Joy Williams	"The Blue Men"	Esquire
Kent Haruf	"Private Debts / Public Holdings"	Grand Street
Charles Baxter	"How I Found My Brother"	Indiana Review
Tobias Wolff	"The Other Miller"	The Atlantic
Robert Taylor, Jr.	"Lady of Spain"	The Hudson Review
Daniel Stern	"The Interpretation of Dreams by Sigmund Freud: A Story"	The Ontario Review
Ron Carlson	"Milk"	The North American Review
Tim O'Brien	"The Things They Carried	Esquire
