= The Best American Short Stories 1962 =

1962 short story anthology

- Editor: Martha Foley
- Language: English
- Series: The Best American Short Stories
- Publisher: Houghton Mifflin Harcourt
- Media type: Print
- ISBN: 978-9997371379
- Preceded by: The Best American Short Stories 1961
- Followed by: The Best American Short Stories 1963

The Best American Short Stories 1962 is a volume in The Best American Short Stories series edited by Martha Foley. The volume was published by Houghton Mifflin Harcourt.

== Background ==
The series is considered one of the "best-known annual anthologies of short fiction" and has anthologized more than 2,000 short stories, including works by some of the most famous writers in contemporary American literature.

In particular, the Willa Cather Review wrote that The Best American Short Stories series "became a repository of values" for creative writing programs, college libraries, and literary magazines. The Los Angeles Times, reflecting on the hundred-year anniversary of the series, noted that it eventually became an "institution" itself, often being taught in classrooms.

== Short stories included ==
Author	Story	Source
Frieda Arkin	"The Light of the Sea"	The Colorado Quarterly
Wayson S. Choy	"The Sound of Waves"	PRISM international
Edward Dahlberg	"Because I Was Flesh"	Prairie Schooner
Borden Deal	"Antaeus"	Southwest Review
Stanley Elkin	"Criers and Kibbitzers, Kibbitzers and Criers"	Perspective
Seymour Epstein	"Wheat Closed Higher, Cotton Was Mixed"	Redbook
George Garrett	"The Old Army Game"	The Sewanee Review
William H. Gass	"The Pedersen Kid"	MSS
Sister Mary Gilbert	"The Model Chapel"	The Virginia Quarterly Review
Donald Hall	"A Day on Ragged"	The New Yorker
Henia Karmel-Wolfe	"The Last Day"	The Reporter
Mary Lavin	"In the Middle of the Fields"	The New Yorker
Jack Thomas Leahy	"Hanging Hair"	Kenyon Review
Ben Maddow	"To Hell the Rabbis"	Kenyon Review
Miriam McKenzie	"Déjà Vu"	New World Writing
Arthur Miller	"The Prophecy"	Esquire
E. Lucas Myers	"The Vindication of Dr. Nestor"	The Sewanee Review
Flannery O'Connor	"Everything That Rises Must Converge"	New World Writing
Thalia Selz	"The Education of a Queen"	Partisan Review
Irwin Shaw	"Love on a Dark Street"	Esquire
John Updike	"Pigeon Feathers"	The New Yorker
