= The Best American Short Stories 1945 =

1945 short story anthology

- Editor: Martha Foley
- Language: English
- Series: The Best American Short Stories
- Publisher: Houghton Mifflin Harcourt
- Media type: Print
- ISBN: 978-9997371317
- Preceded by: The Best American Short Stories 1944
- Followed by: The Best American Short Stories 1946

The Best American Short Stories 1945 is a volume in The Best American Short Stories series edited by Martha Foley. The volume was published by Houghton Mifflin Harcourt.

== Background ==
The series is considered one of the "best-known annual anthologies of short fiction" and has anthologized more than 2,000 short stories, including works by some of the most famous writers in contemporary American literature.

In particular, the Willa Cather Review wrote that The Best American Short Stories series "became a repository of values" for creative writing programs, college libraries, and literary magazines. The Los Angeles Times, reflecting on the hundred-year anniversary of the series, noted that it eventually became an "institution" itself, often being taught in classrooms.

== Short stories included ==
| Author | Story | Source |
|---|---|---|
| Nelson Algren | "How the Devil Came Down Division Street" | Harper's Bazaar |
| Warren Beck | "The First Fish" | Story |
| Louis Bromfield | "Crime Passionnel" | The New Yorker |
| Carlos Bulosan | "My Brother Osong's Career in Politics" | The New Yorker |
| Mary Deasy | "Harvest" | The American Mercury |
| Edward Fenton | "Burial in the Dessert" | Harper's Bazaar |
| Morton Fineman | "The Light of the Morning" | Mademoiselle |
| Bill Gerry | "Understand What I Mean?" | Yale Review |
| Brendan Gill | "The Test" | Good Housekeeping |
| Richard Hagopian | "Be Heavy" | Atlantic Monthly |
| Emily Hahn | "It Never Happened" | The New Yorker |
| W. G. Hardy | "The Czech Dog" | Tomorrow |
| Josephine Johnson | "Fever Flower" | Harper's Bazaar |
| Robert McLaughlin | "Poor Everybody" | The New Yorker |
| John McNulty | "Don't Scrub Off These Names" | The New Yorker |
| Warren Miller | "The Animal's Fair" | Harper's Bazaar |
| George Panetta | "Papa, Mama and Economics" | Mademoiselle |
| Joseph Stanley Pennell | "On the Way to Somewhere Else" | Harper's Bazaar |
| Ruth Portugal | "Call a Solemn Assembly" | Harper's Bazaar |
| Theodore Pratt | "The Owl That Kept Winking" | Esquire |
| Isaac Rosenfeld | "The Hand That Fed Me" | Partisan Review |
| Donna Rowell | "A War Marriage" | Story |
| Gladys Schmitt | "The Mourners" | Harper's Bazaar |
| Irwin Shaw | "Gunner's Passage" | The New Yorker |
| Jean Stafford | "The Wedding: Beacon Hill" | Harper's Bazaar |
| Ruby Pickens Tartt | "Alabama Sketches" | Southwest Review |
| Peter Taylor | "Rain in the Heart" | The Sewanee Review |
| Robert Penn Warren | "Cass Mastern's Wedding Ring" | Partisan Review |
| Jessamyn West | "First Day Finish" | Atlantic Monthly |
| Leane Zugsmith | "This is a Love Story" | The New Yorker |
| William Zukerman | "A Ship to Tarshish" | Prairie Schooner |
