= The Best American Short Stories 1951 =

1951 short story anthology

- Editor: Martha Foley
- Language: English
- Series: The Best American Short Stories
- Publisher: Houghton Mifflin Harcourt
- Media type: Print
- ISBN: 978-9997371515
- Preceded by: The Best American Short Stories 1950
- Followed by: The Best American Short Stories 1952

The Best American Short Stories 1951 is a volume in The Best American Short Stories series edited by Martha Foley. The volume was published by Houghton Mifflin Harcourt.

== Background ==
The series is considered one of the "best-known annual anthologies of short fiction" and has anthologized more than 2,000 short stories, including works by some of the most famous writers in contemporary American literature.

In particular, the Willa Cather Review wrote that The Best American Short Stories series "became a repository of values" for creative writing programs, college libraries, and literary magazines. The Los Angeles Times, reflecting on the hundred-year anniversary of the series, noted that it eventually became an "institution" itself, often being taught in classrooms.

== Short stories included ==
Author	Story	Source
Roger Angell	"Flight Through the Dark"	The New Yorker
Nathan Asch	"Inland, Western Sea"	The New Yorker
Peggy Bennett	"A Fugitive From the Mind"	Mademoiselle
Mary Bolte	"The End of the Depression"	Harper's Bazaar
Hortense Calisher	"In Greenwich There Are Many Grevelled Walks"	The New Yorker
Leonard Casper	"Sense of Direction"	Southwest Review
R.V. Cassill	"Larchmoor Is Not The World"	Furioso
John Cheever	"The Season of Divorce"	The New Yorker
Harris Downey	"The Hunters"	Epoch
Elizabeth Enright	"The Temperate Zone"	The Virginia Quarterly Review
J. Carol Goodman	"The Kingdom of Gordon"	Mademoiselle
Ethel Edison Gordon	"The Value of the Dollar"	Charm
William Goyen	"Her Breath Upon The Windowpane"	Harper's Magazine
Shirley Jackson	"The Summer People"	Charm
Josephine W. Johnson	"The Mother's Story"	Good Housekeeping
Ilona Karmel	"Fru Holm"	Mademoiselle
Oliver La Farge	"Old Century's River"	The Atlantic Monthly
George Lanning	"Old Turkey Neck"	Tomorrow
Ethel G. Lewis	"Portrait"	Epoch
Dorothy Livesay	"The Glass House"	The Northern Review
Robie Macauley	"The Wishbone"	The Sewanee Review
Bernard Malamud	"The Prison"	Commentary
Esther Patt	"The Butcherbirds"	The American Mercury
J.F. Powers	"Death of a Favorite"	The New Yorker
Paul Rader	"The Tabby Cat"	Quarto
Jean Stafford	"The Nemesis"	The New Yorker
Ray B. West, Jr.	"The Last of the Grizzly Bears"	Epoch
Tennessee Williams	"The Resemblance Between A Violin Case and a Coffin"	Flair
