= The Best American Short Stories 1985 =

1985 short story collection

- Editor: Gail Godwin and Shannon Ravenel
- Language: English
- Series: The Best American Short Stories
- Genre: Anthology
- Published: October 1985
- Publisher: Houghton Mifflin Harcourt
- Media type: Print (hardback & paperback)
- Pages: 320
- ISBN: 978-0395390580
- Preceded by: The Best American Short Stories 1984
- Followed by: The Best American Short Stories 1986

The Best American Short Stories 1985, a volume in The Best American Short Stories series, was edited by Shannon Ravenel and by guest editor Gail Godwin. The volume was published by Houghton Mifflin Harcourt.

== Background ==
The series is considered one of the two "best-known annual anthologies of short fiction" and has anthologized more than 2,000 short stories, including works by some of the most famous writers in contemporary American literature, curated by well-known guest editors since 1915. In particular, the Willa Cather Review wrote that The Best American Short Stories series "became a repository of values" for creative writing programs and literary magazines, specifically with considerable "influence" in college libraries, short fiction courses, and fiction workshops.

== Critical reception ==
Kirkus Reviews stated that "nothing dramatically robs you of breath in this year's selection" but noted the prestige of the names included in this year's line-up. They particularly liked "Sarah Cole: A Type of Love Story" by Russell Banks as the "Best of the realism" and lauded Michael Bishop's "Dog Lives" as the "most artful" of the "academic fiction."

Amy Hempel, writing for Los Angeles Times, found some entries weak, such as E. L. Doctorow, Joyce Carol Oates, and Banks' stories, while lauding Beth Nugent's "City of Boys" and Sharon Sheehe Stark's "The Johnstown Polka."

== Short stories included ==
Author	Story	Source
Russell Banks	"Sarah Cole: A Type of Love Story"	The Missouri Review
Michael Bishop	"Dogs' Lives"	The Missouri Review
Ethan Canin	"Emperor of the Air"	The Atlantic Monthly
E. L. Doctorow	"The Leather Man"	The Paris Review
Margaret Edwards	"Roses"	Virginia Quarterly Review
Starkey Flythe	"Walking, Walking"	Northwest Review
H. E. Francis	"The Sudden Trees"	Prairie Schooner
Bev Jafek	"You've Come a Long Way, Mickey Mouse"	Columbia
John L'Heureux	"Clothing"	Tendril
Peter Meinke	"The Piano Tuner"	Atlantic Monthly
Wright Morris	"Fellow-Creatures"	The New Yorker
Bharati Mukherjee	"Angela"	Mother Jones
Beth Nugent	"City of Boys"	North American Review
Joyce Carol Oates	"Raven's Wing"	Esquire
Norman Rush	"Instruments of Seduction"	The Paris Review
Deborah Seabrooke	"Secrets"	Virginia Quarterly Review
Marjorie Sandor	"The Gittel"	The Georgia Review
Jane Smiley	"Lily"	The Atlantic Monthly
Sharon Sheehe Stark	"The Johnstown Polka"	West Branch
Joy Williams	"The Skater"	Esquire
