= The Best American Short Stories 1946 =

1946 short story anthology

- Editor: Martha Foley
- Language: English
- Series: The Best American Short Stories
- Publisher: Houghton Mifflin Harcourt
- Media type: Print
- ISBN: 978-9997371355
- Preceded by: The Best American Short Stories 1945
- Followed by: The Best American Short Stories 1947

The Best American Short Stories 1946 is a volume in The Best American Short Stories series edited by Martha Foley. The volume was published by Houghton Mifflin Harcourt.

== Background ==
The series is considered one of the "best-known annual anthologies of short fiction" and has anthologized more than 2,000 short stories, including works by some of the most famous writers in contemporary American literature.

In particular, the Willa Cather Review wrote that The Best American Short Stories series "became a repository of values" for creative writing programs, college libraries, and literary magazines. The Los Angeles Times, reflecting on the hundred-year anniversary of the series, noted that it eventually became an "institution" itself, often being taught in classrooms.

== Short stories included ==
Author	Story	Source
Charles Angoff	"Jerry"	Prairie Schooner
Warren Beck	"Out of Line"	Yale Review
John Berryman	"The Lovers"	Kenyon Review
Ray Bradbury	"The Big Black and White Game"	American Mercury
Bessie Breuer	"Bury Your Own Dead"	Harper's Bazaar
T. K. Brown III	"The Valley of the Shadow"	Esquire
W. R. Burnett	"The Ivory Tower"	Good Housekeeping
Walter Van Tilburg Clark	"The Wind and the Snow of Winter"	Yale Review
Laurence Critchell	"Flesh and Blood"	Atlantic Monthly
Mary Deasy	"A Sense of Danger"	Harper's Magazine
Samuel Elkin	"In a Military Manner"	Harper's Magazine
Elaine Gottlieb	"The Norm"	Kenyon Review
Elizabeth Hardwick	"The Mysteries of Eleusis"	Partisan Review
Josephine W. Johnson	"Story Without End"	Virginia Quarterly Review
Ben Hur Lampman	"Old Bill Bent to Drink"	Atlantic Monthly
Meyer Liben	"The Caller"	Accent
A. J. Liebling	"Run, Run, Run, Run"	The New Yorker
W. O. Mitchell	"The Owl and the Bens"	Atlantic Monthly
Vladimir Nabokov	"Time and Ebb"	Atlantic Monthly
Ann Petry	"Like a Winding Sheet"	The Crisis
Wentzle Ruml III	"For a Beautiful Relationship"	Kenyon Review
Gladys Schmitt	"The King's Daughter"	Story
Irwin Stark	"The Bridge"	The Antioch Review
James Stern	"The Woman Who Was Loved"	Harper's Bazaar
James Still	"Mrs. Razor"	Atlantic Monthly
Peter Taylor	"The Scout Master"	Partisan Review
Lionel Trilling	"The Other Margaret"	Partisan Review
Henrietta Weigel	"Love Affair"	Kenyon Review
Jessamyn West	"The Singing Lesson"	Harper's Magazine
Glennyth Woods	"Death in a Cathedral"	Twice A Year
