= The Best American Short Stories 1943 =

1943 short story anthology

- Editor: Martha Foley
- Language: English
- Series: The Best American Short Stories
- Publisher: Houghton Mifflin Harcourt
- Media type: Print
- ISBN: 9789997371249
- Preceded by: The Best American Short Stories 1942
- Followed by: The Best American Short Stories 1944

The Best American Short Stories 1943 is a volume in The Best American Short Stories series edited by Martha Foley. The volume was published by Houghton Mifflin Harcourt.

== Background ==
The series is considered one of the "best-known annual anthologies of short fiction" and has anthologized more than 2,000 short stories, including works by some of the most famous writers in contemporary American literature.

In particular, the Willa Cather Review wrote that The Best American Short Stories series "became a repository of values" for creative writing programs, college libraries, and literary magazines. The Los Angeles Times, reflecting on the hundred-year anniversary of the series, noted that it eventually became an "institution" itself, often being taught in classrooms.

== Short stories included ==
Author	Story	Source
Vicki Baum	"This Healthy Life"	Story
Warren Beck	"Boundary Line"	Rocky Mountain Review
Kay Boyle	"Frenchman's Ship"	The Saturday Evening Post
John Cheever	"The Pleasures of Solitude"	The New Yorker
Guido D'Agostino	"The Dream of Angelo Zara"	Story
Murray Dyer	"Samuel Blane"	Harper's Magazine
William Faulkner	"The Bear"	The Saturday Evening Post
Rachel Field	"Beginning of Wisdom"	American Magazine
Vardis Fisher	"A Partnership With Death"	Rocky Mountain Review
Grace Flandrau	"What Do You See, Dear Enid?"	The New Yorker
Robert Gibbons	"Time's End"	Atlantic Monthly
Peter Gray	"Threnody for Stelios"	Virginia Quarterly Review
Nancy Hale	"Who Lived and Died Believing"	Harper's Bazaar
Paul Horgan	"The Peach Stone"	Yale Review
Laurette MacDuffie Knight	"The Enchanted"	Story
Clara Laidlaw	"The Little Black Boys"	Atlantic Monthly
Mary Lavin	"Love Is For Lovers"	Harper's Bazaar
Edita Morris	"Young Man in an Astrakhan Cap"	Harper's Bazaar
William Saroyan	"Knife-Like, Flower-Like, Like Nothing At All in the World"	Harper's Bazaar
Delmore Schwartz	"An Argument in 1934"	The Kenyon Review
Irwin Shaw	"Preach on the Dusty Roads"	The New Yorker
Margaret Shedd	"My Public"	Harper's Bazaar
Wallace Stegner	"Chip Off the Old Block"	Virginia Quarterly Review
Alison Stuart	"Death and My Uncle Felix"	Mademoiselle
Jesse Stuart	"Dawn of Remembered Spring"	Harper's Bazaar
Richard Sullivan	"The Women"	Accent
James Thurber	"The Catbird Seat"	The New Yorker
Jessie Treichler	"Homecoming"	The Antioch Review
Jerome Weidman	"Philadelphia Express"	The New Yorker
Eudora Welty	"Asphodel"	Yale Review
