= The Best American Short Stories 1944 =

1944 short story anthology

- Editor: Martha Foley
- Language: English
- Series: The Best American Short Stories
- Publisher: Houghton Mifflin Harcourt
- Media type: Print
- ISBN: 9789997371270
- Preceded by: The Best American Short Stories 1943
- Followed by: The Best American Short Stories 1945

The Best American Short Stories 1944 is a volume in The Best American Short Stories series edited by Martha Foley. The volume was published by Houghton Mifflin Harcourt.

== Background ==
The series is considered one of the "best-known annual anthologies of short fiction" and has anthologized more than 2,000 short stories, including works by some of the most famous writers in contemporary American literature.

In particular, the Willa Cather Review wrote that The Best American Short Stories series "became a repository of values" for creative writing programs, college libraries, and literary magazines. The Los Angeles Times, reflecting on the hundred-year anniversary of the series, noted that it eventually became an "institution" itself, often being taught in classrooms.

== Short stories included ==
Author	Story	Source
Sidney A. Alexander	"The White Boat"	Accent
William E. Barrett	"Señor Payroll"	Southwest Review
Saul Bellow	"Notes of a Dangling Man"	Partisan Review
Dorothy Canfield	"The Knot Hole"	Yale Review
Elizabeth Eastman	"Like a Field Mouse over the Heart"	Harper's Bazaar
Helen Eustis	"The Good Days and the Bad"	Story
William Fifield	"The Fishermen of Patzcuaro"	Story
Berry Fleming	"Strike Up a Stirring Music"	Yale Review
Hazel Hawthorne	"More like a Coffin"	The New Yorker
Noel Houston	"A Local Skirmish"	The New Yorker
Shirley Jackson	"Come Dance with Me in Ireland"	The New Yorker
Josephine W. Johnson	"The Rented Room"	Harper's Bazaar
H. J. Kaplan	"The Mohammedans"	Partisan Review
Eyre De Lanux	"The S.S. Libertad"	Tomorrow
William March	"The Female of the Fruit Fly"	Mademoiselle
Carson McCullers	"The Ballad of the Sad Café"	Harper's Bazaar
Astrid Meighan	"Shoe the Horse and Shoe the Mare"	The New Yorker
Mary Mian	"Exiles from the Creuse"	The New Yorker
Edita Morris	"Heart of Marzipan"	Mademoiselle
Vladimir Nabokov	"'That in Aleppo Once. . .'"	Atlantic Monthly
Ruth Portugal	"Neither Here nor There"	Harper's Bazaar
J. F. Powers	"Lions, Harts, Leaping Does"	Accent
Gladys Schmitt	"All Souls'"	Collier's
Irwin Shaw	"The Veterans Reflect"	Accent
George Stiles	"A Return"	Kenyon Review
Leon Z. Surmelian	"My Russian Cap"	The New Mexico Quarterly Review
Lionel Trilling	"Of This Time, of That Place"	Partisan Review
Elizabeth Warner	"An Afternoon"	The New Yorker
Jessamyn West	"The Illumination"	Harper's Bazaar
Emmanuel Winters	"God's Agents Have Beards"	Harper's Bazaar
