= The Best American Short Stories 1988 =

1991 short story collection

- Editor: Shannon Ravenel and Mark Helprin
- Language: English
- Series: The Best American Short Stories
- Published: 1988
- Publisher: Houghton Mifflin Harcourt
- Media type: Print (hardback & paperback)
- ISBN: 0395442575
- Preceded by: The Best American Short Stories 1987
- Followed by: The Best American Short Stories 1989

The Best American Short Stories 1988, a volume in The Best American Short Stories series, was edited by Shannon Ravenel and by guest editor Mark Helprin. In announcing the publication of this annual edition, Publishers Weekly noted that it is an "at times inspired anthology which draws from small and big-gun literary magazines in equal measures [and] is heralded by a sonorous, sagacious introduction..." while the reviewer at Kirkus Reviews described Mark Helprin's introduction as a "John-Gardneresque screed."

== Short stories included ==
Author	Story	Source
Rick Bass	"Cats and Students, Bubbles and Abysses"	Carolina Quarterly
Richard Bausch	"Police Dreams"	The Atlantic
Will Blythe	"The Taming Power of the Small"	Epoch
Raymond Carver	"Errand"	The New Yorker
Richard Currey	"Waiting for Trains"	North American Review
Louise Erdrich	"Snares"	Harper's Magazine
Mavis Gallant	"Dédé"	The New Yorker
C. S. Godshalk	"Wonderland"	The Iowa Review
E. S. Goldman	"Way to the Dump"	The Atlantic
Lucy Honig	"No Friends, All Strangers"	The Agni Review
Gish Jen	"The Water-Faucet Vision"	Nimrod
Hilding Johnson	"Victoria"	StoryQuarterly
Brian Kiteley	"Still Life with Insects"	Fiction
Robert Lacy	"The Natural Father"	Crazyhorse
Ralph Lombreglia	"Inn Essence"	The Atlantic
Edith Milton	"Entrechat"	The Kenyon Review
Marjorie Sandor	"Still Life"	The Georgia Review
Robert Stone	"Helping"	The New Yorker
Mary Ann Taylor-Hall	"Banana Boats"	The Paris Review
Tobias Wolff	"Smorgasbord"	Esquire
