= Sharon Sheehe Stark =

American novelist (1941-2023)

- Born: Sharon Sheehe; December 19, 1941; Altoona, Pennsylvania, U.S.
- Died: November 25, 2023 (aged 81); Kutztown, Pennsylvania, U.S.
- Occupations: Novelist; short story writer
- Spouses: Howard Stark (m. 1960, divorced) William Bascom (died 2018)
- Children: 2
- Writing career
- Genre: Fiction
- Notable awards: Guggenheim Fellowship (1987)

Sharon Alean Sheehe Stark (December 29, 1941 – November 25, 2023) was an American novelist and short story writer. After her children left for college, she began regularly writing, publishing short stories in several magazines and anthologies, including the 1983 and 1985 editions of The Best American Short Stories. In 1987, she published the novel A Wrestling Season and received a Guggenheim Fellowship for a second novel.

== Biography ==
Sharon Alean Sheehe was born on December 29, 1941, in Altoona, Pennsylvania. She was the daughter of glass artist Lillian (née Kukovitz) and Joseph Sheehe. After graduating from Bishop McCort High School in 1959, she attended the University of Pittsburgh from 1959 until 1960.

In 1966, Stark sold a story to Ave Maria, but did not invest fully into writing until her children left to study at college. Her short stories "Best Quality Glass Company, New York" and "The Johnstown Polka" appeared in The Best American Short Stories 1983 and 1985, respectively. In 1985, she published a short story collection titled The Dealers' Yard and Other Stories. In 1987, she published her debut novel A Wrestling Season. That same year, she was awarded a Guggenheim Fellowship in fiction; at the time, she planned to finance her second novel for the book, as well as a computer with a word processor and a trip to Ireland for research. She also published short stories in numerous magazines and literary journals such as The Antioch Review, The Cimarron Review, Playgirl, Prairie Schooner, and Yankee.

Stark was a 1984 Bread Loaf Writers' Conference Fellow, before working there as a staff associate in 1987. In 1985, she joined the Norwich University faculty as a member of the Vermont College MFA program. She was also the writer-in-residence at Swarthmore College during their Spring 1986 semester. She was also a 1986 National Endowment for the Arts Fellow.

In addition to her writing career, Stark also worked as an antique textile dealer, selling in antique markets and eBay. She also owned a collection of textiles, with several as old as the 18th-century, and including bed coverings and quilts. In 1985, Stark appeared in a three-generation art exhibit at the Community Arts Center of Cambria County, with her mother present.

She married Howard Stark (a lawyer based in Allentown) on September 3, 1960; they had two children before divorcing. Her second husband was William Bascom, an Allentown bookseller and antiques dealer; they were married from 2010 until his death in 2018. She had two siblings. She lived in Lenhartsville, Pennsylvania, before moving to nearby Kutztown.

Stark died on November 25, 2023, at her Kutztown home, following a battle with Parkinson’s disease.

== Works ==
- The Dealers' Yard and Other Stories (1985) (Note: Reviews of this book:)
- A Wrestling Season (1987) (Note: Reviews of this book:)
