= The Best American Short Stories 1969 =

1969 short story anthology

- Editor: Martha Foley
- Language: English
- Series: The Best American Short Stories
- Publisher: Houghton Mifflin Harcourt
- Media type: Print
- ISBN: 978-9997371584
- Preceded by: The Best American Short Stories 1968
- Followed by: The Best American Short Stories 1970

The Best American Short Stories 1969 is a volume in The Best American Short Stories series edited by Martha Foley. The volume was published by Houghton Mifflin Harcourt.

== Background ==
The series is considered one of the "best-known annual anthologies of short fiction" and has anthologized more than 2,000 short stories, including works by some of the most famous writers in contemporary American literature.

In particular, the Willa Cather Review wrote that The Best American Short Stories series "became a repository of values" for creative writing programs, college libraries, and literary magazines. The Los Angeles Times, reflecting on the hundred-year anniversary of the series, noted that it eventually became an "institution" itself, often being taught in classrooms.

== Short stories included ==
| Author | Story | Source |
|---|---|---|
| Maeve Brennan | "The Eldest Child" | The New Yorker |
| Jack Cady | "Play Like I'm Sheriff" | Twigs |
| Mark Costello | "Murphy's Xmas" | The Transatlantic Review |
| John Bart Gerald | "Walking Wounded" | Harper's Magazine |
| Mary Gray Hughes | "The Foreigner in the Blood" | Esquire |
| Norma Klein | "The Boy in the Green Hat" | Prairie Schooner |
| Mary Lavin | "Happiness" | The New Yorker |
| Alistair MacLeod | "The Boat" | The Massachusetts Review |
| David Madden | "The Day the Flowers Came" | Playboy |
| Bernard Malamud | "Pictures of Fidelman" | The Atlantic |
| Matthew W. McGreggor | "Porkchops with Whiskey and Ice Cream" | The Virginia Quarterly Review |
| James Alan McPherson | "Gold Coast" | The Atlantic |
| John R. Milton | "The Inheritance of Emmy One Horse" | The South Dakota Review |
| Joyce Carol Oates | "By The River" | December |
| Nancy Pelletier Pansing | "The Visitation" | Intro #1 |
| Sylvia Plath | "Johnny Panic and the Bible of Dreams" | The Atlantic |
| Miriam Rugel | "Paper Poppy" | Kenyon Review |
| Margaret Shipley | "The Tea Bowl of Ninsei Nomura " | The Denver Quarterly |
| Isaac Bashevis Singer | "The Colony" | Commentary |
| Joyce Madelon Winslow | "Benjamen Burning" | Intro #1 |
