= The Best American Short Stories 1942 =

1942 short story anthology

- Editor: Martha Foley
- Language: English
- Series: The Best American Short Stories
- Publisher: Houghton Mifflin Harcourt
- Media type: Print
- ISBN: 978-9997371195
- Preceded by: The Best American Short Stories 1941
- Followed by: The Best American Short Stories 1943

The Best American Short Stories 1942 is a volume in The Best American Short Stories series edited by Martha Foley. The volume was published by Houghton Mifflin Harcourt.

== Background ==
The series is considered one of the "best-known annual anthologies of short fiction" and has anthologized more than 2,000 short stories, including works by some of the most famous writers in contemporary American literature.

In particular, the Willa Cather Review wrote that The Best American Short Stories series "became a repository of values" for creative writing programs, college libraries, and literary magazines. The Los Angeles Times, reflecting on the hundred-year anniversary of the series, noted that it eventually became an "institution" itself, often being taught in classrooms.

== Short stories included ==
Author	Story	Source
Nelson Algren	"Biceps"	The Southern Review
Ludwig Bemelmans	"The Valet of the Splendide"	The New Yorker
Sally Benson	"5135 Kensington: August, 1903"	The New Yorker
Kay Boyle	"Nothing Ever Breaks Except the Heart"	The New Yorker
Jack Y. Bryan	"For Each of Us"	American Prefaces
Walter Van Tilburg Clark	"The Portable Phonograph"	Yale Review
David Cornel DeJong	"That Frozen Hour"	Harper's Bazaar
Boyce Eakin	"Prairies"	The New Mexico Quarterly Review
Morton Fineman	"Tell Him I Waited"	Story
Robert Gibbons	"A Loaf of Bread"	The New Republic
Nancy Hale	"Those Are As Brothers"	Mademoiselle
MacKinlay Kantor	"That Greek Dog"	Saturday Evening Post
Eric Knight	"Sam Small's Better Half"	Story
Mary Medearis	"Death of a Country Doctor"	Story
Edita Morris	"Caput Mortuum"	Harper's Bazaar
Mary O' Hara	"My Friend Flicka"	Story
Margaret Rhodes Peattie	"The Green Village"	Saturday Evening Post
William Saroyan	"The Hummingbird That Lived Through Winter"	Harper's Bazaar
Michael Seide	"Sacrifice of Isaac"	American Prefaces
Budd Wilson Schulberg	"The Real Viennese Schmalz"	Esquire
Irwin Shaw	"Search Through the Streets of the City"	The New Yorker
Wallace Stegner	"In the Twilight"	Mademoiselle
John Steinbeck	"How Edith McGillcuddy Met R. L. Stevenson"	Harper's Magazine
Jesse Stuart	"The Storm"	The Household Magazine
Peter Taylor	"The Fancy Woman"	The Southern Review
Dorothy Thomas	"My Pigeon Pair"	Harper's Magazine
James Thurber	"You Could Look It Up"	Saturday Evening Post
Joan Vatsek	"The Bees"	Story
Mary Lavin	"At Sallygap"	Atlantic Monthly
Marjorie Worthington	"Hunger"	Harper's Bazaar
