= Cecil Dawkins =

American author (1927–2019)

Cecil Dawkins (October 2, 1927 - May 11, 2019) was an American author who wrote primarily fiction.

== Early life ==
Dawkins was born October 2, 1927, in Birmingham, Alabama, where she grew to adulthood. After graduating from the University of Alabama with a B.A. in English in 1950, where she was a member of the Zeta Tau Alpha women's fraternity. She then studied at Stanford University, where she earned her M.A. degree in English literature in 1953. Her second year at Stanford she was awarded the Stanford University Creative Writing Fellowship, (now the Wallace Stegner Fellowship), 1952–1953.

== Career ==
She has held the following academic positions:

- Writer in Residence, Stephens College, 1973–1979.
- Guest faculty, Sarah Lawrence College, 1979–1981.
- Distinguished Visiting Writer, University of Hawaiʻi at Mānoa, 1991.
- Calloway/O'Connor Chair Professor, Georgia College, Milledgeville, Georgia, 1996–1997.

The Quiet Enemy, a collection of Dawkins' short stories, was published by Athenaeum in 1963 and was concurrently published by Andre Deutsch in London. One story in that collection appeared in a Martha Foley Best American Short Stories of 1963 collection and also won an award in Southwest Review and the John H. McGinnis Award for the Best Story in Two Years. Individual stories from this collection had first appeared in the Paris Review, the Georgia Review, and the Sewanee Review. The Quiet Enemy was reissued in the Penguin Contemporary American Fiction series, and again, in 1996, by the Georgia University Press.

During 1966–67, a play in two acts by Dawkins, The Displaced Person, based on the stories of Flannery O'Connor "with her knowledge and input," was produced in New York City by the American Place Theater. Dawkins regularly corresponded with O'Connor. A large number of O'Connor's letters to Dawkins are published in Letters of Flannery O'Connor: The Habit of Being, edited by Sally Fitzgerald.

In 1971, Harper and Row published Dawkins' first novel, The Live Goat, winner of the Harper-Saxton Fellowship. Her second novel, Charleyhorse, published by Viking in 1985, was reissued by Penguin in 1986 and again by Allison in 1989.

Dawkins also wrote a series of mystery novels set in New Mexico, published by Fawcett: The Santa Fe Rembrandt, 1993; Clay Dancers, 1994; Rare Earth, 1995; and Turtle Truths, 1997.

In 2002 Dawkins compiled a biography of Frances Martin, aka Frances Minerva Nunnery, from Martin's tape-recorded reminiscences, called A Woman of the Century, Frances Minerva Nunnery (1898-1997): Her Story in Her Own Memorable Voice as Told to Cecil Dawkins (University of New Mexico Press, 2002), with a Foreword by Max Evans and a Preface and an Afterword by Dawkins.

Dawkins has additionally been awarded the following:

- Guggenheim Fellowship, 1966, with an extension for 1967.
- National Endowment for the Arts Grant, 1976–1977.
