= The Best American Short Stories 1983 =

1983 book

- Editor: Shannon Ravenel and Anne Tyler
- Language: English
- Series: The Best American Short Stories
- Publisher: Houghton Mifflin Harcourt
- Media type: Print (hardback & paperback)
- ISBN: 978-0395348444
- Preceded by: The Best American Short Stories 1982
- Followed by: The Best American Short Stories 1984

The Best American Short Stories 1983, a volume in The Best American Short Stories series, was edited by Shannon Ravenel and by guest editor Anne Tyler. The volume was published by Houghton Mifflin Harcourt.

== Background ==
The series is considered one of the "best-known annual anthologies of short fiction" and has anthologized more than 2,000 short stories, including works by some of the most famous writers in contemporary American literature, curated by well-known guest editors since 1915. Specifically, Amy Hempel considered it and the O. Henry Award's prize anthology to compile "the best short fiction published in American and Canadian magazines during the preceding year."

In particular, the Willa Cather Review wrote that The Best American Short Stories series "became a repository of values" for creative writing programs and literary magazines, specifically with considerable "influence" in college libraries, short fiction courses, and fiction workshops.

== Critical reception ==
Kirkus Reviews called Anne Tyler's curation less impressive and idiosyncratic than previous guest editors but called the book "Still—one of the better post-Foley anthologies, with few risks and few inspired moments, but also with few pretensions or embarrassments."

== Short stories included ==
Author	Story	Source
Bill Barich	"Hard to Be Good"	The New Yorker
Carol Bly	"The Dignity of Life"	Ploughshares
James Bond	"A Change of Season"	Epoch
Raymond Carver	"Where I'm Calling From"	The New Yorker
Carolyn Chute	"“Ollie, Oh...”"	Ploughshares
Laurie Colwin	"My Mistress"	Playboy
Joseph Epstein	"The Count and the Princess"	The Hudson Review
Louise Erdrich	"Scales"	The North American Review
Ursula K. Le Guin	"The Professor's Houses"	The New Yorker
Ursula K. Le Guin	"Sur (A Summary Report of the Yelcho Expedition to the Antarctic, 1909-10)"	The New Yorker
Bobbie Ann Mason	"Graveyard Day"	Ascent
Wright Morris	"Victrola"	The New Yorker
Guy Vanderhaeghe	"Reunion"	Saturday Night
Sharon Sheehe Stark	"Best Quality Glass Company, New York"	Prairie Schooner
Robert Taylor, Jr.	"Colorado"	The Ohio Review
Marian Thurm	"Starlight"	The New Yorker
John Updike	"Deaths of Distant Friends"	The New Yorker
Julie Schumacher	"Reunion"	California Quarterly
Diane Vreuls	"Beebee "	Shenandoah
Larry Woiwode	"Firstborn"	The New Yorker
