= The Best American Short Stories 1984 =

1984 book

- Editor: John Updike (guest editor), Shannon Ravenel (series editor)
- Language: English
- Series: The Best American Short Stories
- Genre: Short fiction anthology
- Published: 1984
- Publisher: Houghton Mifflin
- Publication place: United States
- Media type: Print (hardcover & paperback)
- ISBN: 978-0-395-35413-1
- Preceded by: The Best American Short Stories 1983
- Followed by: The Best American Short Stories 1985

The Best American Short Stories 1984 is a volume in the long-running The Best American Short Stories anthology series. The 1984 edition was edited by series editor Shannon Ravenel and guest editor John Updike. It was published by Houghton Mifflin in 1984.

The volume features a selection of notable short fiction published in American periodicals during the preceding year, chosen for their literary merit and variety of voice and style.

== Background ==
The series is regarded as one of the best-known annual anthologies of short fiction in the United States. Since its inception in 1915, The Best American Short Stories has anthologized more than 2,000 short stories, featuring works by many of the most prominent voices in contemporary American literature. Each annual volume is curated by a notable guest editor in collaboration with the series editor.

Writer Amy Hempel has recognized The Best American Short Stories, along with the O. Henry Award anthology, as among the most authoritative collections of "the best short fiction published in American and Canadian magazines during the preceding year."

According to the Willa Cather Review, the series "became a repository of values" for creative writing programs and literary journals, exerting significant influence in college libraries, short fiction courses, and fiction workshops.

== Critical reception ==
Kirkus Reviews praised John Updike as "the most satisfying guest editor" of the series to date, noting that his "personal taste never leads to the inclusion of second-rate, graceless work."

Writing for The New York Times, author John L'Heureux described the anthology as a collection of "20 solid stories, selected by John Updike. Each provides a good read, a few are truly stunning, and—best of all—they come prefaced by Mr. Updike's lucid and informative introduction."

== Short stories included ==
Author	Story	Source
Lee K. Abbott	"The Final Proof of Fate and Circumstance"	The Georgia Review
Madison Smartt Bell	"The Naked Lady"	The Crescent Review
Dianne Benedict	"Unknown Feathers"	MSS
Paul Bowles	"In The Red Room"	Antaeus
Mary Ward Brown	"The Cure"	Ascent
Rick DeMarinis	"Gent"	CutBank
Andre Dubus	"A Father's Story"	Black Warrior Review
Mavis Gallant	"Lena"	The New Yorker
Mary Hood	"Inexorable Progress"	The Georgia Review
Donald Justice	"The Artificial Moonlight"	Antaeus
Stephen Kirk	"Morrison's Reaction"	Greensboro Review
Susan Minot	"Thorofare"	The New Yorker
Wright Morris	"Glimpse Into Another Country"	The New Yorker
Joyce Carol Oates	"Nairobi"	The Paris Review
Cynthia Ozick	"Rosa"	The New Yorker
Lowry Pei	"The Cold Room"	Stories
Jonathan Penner	"Things To Be Thrown Away"	The Yale Review
Norman Rush	"Bruns "	The New Yorker
James Salter	"Foreign Shores"	Esquire
Jeanne Schinto	"Caddies' Day"	Greensboro Review
