= Anthony Robinson (novelist) =

American writer (1931–2026)

- Born: 1931
- Died: October 27 (aged 95); New Paltz, New York, U.S.
- Education: Phillips Academy; Columbia University (BA, MA)
- Occupations: Novelist; short story writer
- Spouse(s): Mary (died 1976) Tatiana Padwa (m. 1998)
- Children: 2
- Parent: Henry Morton Robinson (father)
- Website: www.arobinson.net

Anthony Robinson (1931–October 27, 2026) was an American novelist and short story writer. He was professor emeritus of English and the director of the creative writing program at the State University of New York at New Paltz.

== Early life and education ==
The son of novelist Henry Morton Robinson, Anthony Robinson grew up in the Maverick Artists Colony in Woodstock, New York.

He graduated from Phillips Academy Andover in 1949 and Columbia University cum laude in 1953 where Mark Van Doren and George Nobbe encouraged him to pursue a career in writing. At Columbia, he was a member of the Alpha Delta Phi literary society. He later received his Master of Arts in English from Columbia in 1960.

== Career ==
Robinson served on active duty in the United States Navy Reserve from 1953 to 1956 in the final days of the Korean War, ultimately attaining the rank of lieutenant. A story he wrote aboard ship, “The Farlow Express,” was published in Prairie Schooner in 1956 and was later included in The Best American Short Stories 1957.

His first novel, A Departure From the Rules, the fictional story of the worst peacetime disaster in the history of the United States Navy, drew on his Navy experience, and was cited by critics for its "extraordinary skill." He then turned his attention to the moral issues of contemporary society in The Easy Way, praised for its "insights into the legal profession." His work Home Again, Home Again, drew on his experience in the Maverick Artists Colony, "for which the author has a visible attachment." His 1991 novel, The Member-Guest, has been described as "the consummate golf novel."

He joined the New Paltz faculty in 1964 and remained there until his retirement in 2000. He spent the academic year of 1971–1972 teaching at the University of Paris at Vincennes.

== Personal life ==
His first marriage ended in 1976 with the death of his wife, Mary. He remarried in 1998, to artist Tatiana Padwa, a childhood friend from Woodstock. He had two children, Jennifer and Henry, from his first marriage.

Robinson died in his sleep at his home in New Paltz, New York on October 27, 2026. He was 95.

== Bibliography ==
=== Books ===
- A Departure from the Rules (novel; Putnam, 1960)
- The Easy Way (novel; Simon & Schuster, 1963)
- Home Again, Home Again (novel; William Morrow, 1969)
- The Whole Truth (novel; Donald I. Fine, 1990)
- The Member-Guest (novel; Donald I. Fine, 1991)
- The American Golfer (novel; CreateSpace, 2010)
- The Floodplain (novel; Codhill Press, 2011)
- Father of the Man (novel; CreateSpace, 2018)

=== Short stories ===
- My Finnegan (1949)
- The Lesson (1961)
- The Dirt Machine (1964)
- Navy Buttons (1965)
- A Turn In The Match (1982)
- New Water ( collection of twelve short stories; CreateSpace, 2013) - includes previously published short stories
  - The Farlow Express (1956)
  - Zerk the Jerk (1985)
  - The Three-Mile Run (2007)
