= The Best American Short Stories 1989 =

1990 short story collection

- Editor: Shannon Ravenel and Margaret Atwood
- Language: English
- Series: The Best American Short Stories
- Published: 1989
- Publisher: Houghton Mifflin Harcourt
- Media type: Print (hardback & paperback)
- ISBN: 0395470978
- Preceded by: The Best American Short Stories 1988
- Followed by: The Best American Short Stories 1990

The Best American Short Stories 1989, a volume in The Best American Short Stories series, was edited by Shannon Ravenel and by guest editor Margaret Atwood.

In her introductory essay titled "Reading Blind" guest editor Margaret Atwood writes:

I’ve spoken of "the voice of the story," which has become a sort of catchall phrase; but by it I intend something more specific: a speaking voice, like the singing voice in music, that moves not across space, across the page, but through time. Surely every written story is, in the final analysis, a score for voice. Those little black marks on the page mean nothing without their re-translation into sound.(xiv)

At the conclusion of her essay outlining how she made her selections she state "From listening to the stories of others, we learn to tell our own." (xxiii)

== Reception ==
A review appearing in Kirkus Reviews states that "(n)ovelist Atwood writes a mild, conventional introduction to her choices for this year's Best, which themselves are mostly mild and conventional stories" and praises three selections for standing out from the others, which are judged to be "less than stellar and often quite predictable in angle and attack" although two of those short stories "weigh in with strong works of voice". In the Publishers Weekly review it was noted that "this anthology is, for the most part, unusually compelling. Atwood and series editor Ravenel's 20 selections achieve momentum via a variety of approaches." In a review for The New York Times Nona Balakian writes that "what lends a family likeness to most of the 20 writers in this volume is their preference for the aural tradition. It proves a refreshing change from a tired minimalism that has prevailed."

== Short stories included ==
Author	Story	Source
Charles Baxter	"Fenstad's Mother"	The Atlantic
Madison Smartt Bell	"Customs of the Country"	Harper's Magazine
Robert Boswell	"Living to Be a Hundred"	The Iowa Review
Blanche McCrary Boyd	"The Black Hand Girl"	Voice Literary Supplement
Larry Brown	"Kubuku Rides (This Is It)"	Greensboro Review
Frederick Busch	"Ralph the Duck"	The Quarterly
Michael Cunningham	"White Angel"	The New Yorker
Rick DeMarinis	"The Flowers of Boredom"	The Antioch Review
Harriet Doerr	"Edie: A Life"	Epoch
Mavis Gallant	"The Concert Party"	The New Yorker
Douglas Glover	"Why I Decide to Kill Myself and Other Jokes"	Translation
Barbara Gowdy	"Disneyland"	North American Review
Linda Hogan	"Aunt Moon's Young Man"	The Missouri Review
David Wong Louie	"Displacement"	Ploughshares
Bharati Mukherjee	"The Management of Grief"	Fiction Network
Alice Munro	"Meneseteung"	The New Yorker
Dale Ray Phillips	"What Men Love For"	The Atlantic
Mark Richard	"Strays"	Esquire
Arthur Robinson	"The Boy on the Train"	The New Yorker
M. T. Sharif	"The Letter Writer"	The AGNI Review
