= Castle Keep =

1969 film by Sydney Pollack

- Directed by: Sydney Pollack
- Written by: Daniel Taradash; David Rayfiel
- Based on: Castle Keep (1965 novel) by William Eastlake
- Produced by: John Calley; Martin Ransohoff
- Starring: Burt Lancaster; Patrick O'Neal; Jean-Pierre Aumont; Bruce Dern; Peter Falk
- Narrated by: Al Freeman Jr.
- Cinematography: Henri Decaë
- Edited by: Malcolm Cooke
- Music by: Michel Legrand
- Color process: Technicolor
- Production companies: Filmways Pictures; Avala Film
- Distributed by: Columbia Pictures
- Release date: July 23, 1969
- Running time: 107 minutes
- Countries: United States, Yugoslavia
- Language: English
- Budget: $8 million
- Box office: $1.8 million (US/ Canada rentals)

Castle Keep is a 1969 American war comedy-drama film combining surrealism with tragic realism. It was directed by Sydney Pollack, and starred Burt Lancaster, Patrick O'Neal, Jean-Pierre Aumont, Bruce Dern and Peter Falk. The film appeared in the summer of 1969, a few months before the premiere of Pollack's smash hit They Shoot Horses, Don't They?

The film is based on the novel of the same name by William Eastlake published in 1965, and according to New York Times critic Vincent Canby “accomplishes the dubious feat of being both anti and pro war at the same time”. Eastlake enlisted in the United States Army in 1942. He served in the Infantry for four and a half years, and was wounded while leading a platoon during the Battle of the Bulge.

== Plot ==
The film opens with images of ancient European artworks being blown to pieces amidst the sounds of war and dissonant screams. As the narrator begins his tale of "eight American soldiers" the scene abruptly jumps back in time to a few weeks earlier.

In December 1944 a ragtag group of American soldiers is travelling to the rear for rest. The one-eyed Major Abraham Falconer (Burt Lancaster) leads the group, which includes Sergeant Rossi (Peter Falk), art expert Captain Beckman (Patrick O'Neal), and the narrator, African-American Private Allistair Benjamin (Al Freeman Jr.). They take shelter in a 10th Century Belgian castle, the Maldorais, which contains many priceless and irreplaceable art treasures.

Falconer begins a love affair with the young Countess (Astrid Heeren) only to find she isn't the Count's niece but his wife. The Count of Maldorais, Henri Tixier (Jean-Pierre Aumont), admits his impotence to Falconer, and hopes the Major will impregnate the Countess so his line may continue. Beckman argues with Falconer about the valuable ancient art works in the castle and his own unrequited attraction for the Countess, who seems to symbolize the beauty of the European art he studied before the war. Beckman inventories the art as he moves it into storage beneath the castle. The enlisted men seek their own pleasures at the psychedelic "Reine Rouge" (Red Queen) brothel in the nearby town, run by a mystic madam. Sergeant Rossi, a baker in peacetime, falls in love with a baker's widow and goes AWOL to live peacefully in the village boulangerie. Corporal Clearboy falls in love with a Volkswagen Beetle, his affection bordering on paraphilia.

The Americans enjoy their respite, surrounded by unattainable luxury, but are slowly overcome by foreboding. One soldier has a sense of eternal recurrence, feeling a sense he's "been here before". A feeling of inevitability of what will eventually transpire overcomes them, and the cynical Major Falconer predicts the Germans will attack the thin American positions in the Ardennes with the castle being a strategic point in the Germans' advance towards the crossroads of Bastogne. German star shell signals over the town of St. Croix prove him correct.

A band of zealous, hymn-singing conscientious objectors led by Lieutenant Billy Byron Bix (Bruce Dern) attempts to evangelize the town and are driven away by Sergeant Rossi. While horseback riding with the Count, the Major discovers a German reconnaissance patrol led by an officer who was a previous lover of the Countess while billeted at the castle. The Count is disquieted and impressed by Falconer's ruthless efficiency when he kills the entire patrol. A German reconnaissance plane is shot down by Beckman and Lieutenant Amberjack and Sergeant Rossi have a strange encounter with a German skirmisher.

Falconer refuses to abandon the castle despite the signs of a major German advance and prepares defensive positions. Captain Beckman and the Count are horrified, believing the decision will lead to the castle's destruction. Falconer sends his unit into town to delay the enemy advance and attempts to rally shell shocked American troops retreating from the advancing front. He forces Lieutenant Bix's group at gunpoint to lead the dazed survivors in a bizarre Pied Piper-esque procession to the castle, but they are all killed by artillery fire.

The ladies of the "Reine Rouge", with training by Falconer, ambush German tanks with Molotov cocktails. The Americans inflict heavy losses on the Germans with scrounged heavy weapons, and Lieutenant Amberjack and Private Elk man a captured German tank, but the defenders are outnumbered and outgunned, and are forced to retreat to the castle. Falconer discovers the Count has fled to the German lines. Beckman concludes the Count has betrayed them and will lead the Germans into the underground storage tunnels and take the castle without destroying it. Falconer orders Beckman to demolish the tunnel when the Germans enter. Beckman complies as the Countess looks on, despite the valuable works of art stored there. The Germans gun down the Count, believing he deliberately led them into a trap.

The Germans attack through a rose garden and attempt to cross the moat with a fire truck, but Falconer orders the moat filled with gasoline and set ablaze. The Americans are killed one by one as much the castle and its treasures are obliterated by artillery. The narrator, quoting from Private Benjamin's book, explains the Americans all survived the battle, at odds with the on screen deaths of everyone but Benjamin.

Falconer and Beckman, both wounded, put aside their differences and man a .50 caliber machine gun pointed across the castle roof. Benjamin escapes with the pregnant Countess through an underground tunnel leading away from the Germans. Falconer reflects on the Countess and all the men who have died because of him as he guns down advancing Germans. A shell explodes on his position and the screen fades to white. The film finishes where it began, echoing the theme of eternal recurrence, with more long shots of the undemolished Maldorais as it once stood, as well as a voice-over of Private Benjamin's narration from the very beginning, and then the final credits roll.

== Cast ==
- Burt Lancaster as Major Abraham Falconer
- Patrick O'Neal as Captain Lionel Beckman
- Jean-Pierre Aumont as the Count of Maldorais
- Peter Falk as Sergeant Rossi
- Astrid Heeren as the Countess Therese
- Scott Wilson as Corporal Clearboy
- Tony Bill as Lieutenant Amberjack
- Al Freeman Jr. as Private Allistair Piersall Benjamin
- James Patterson as Elk
- Bruce Dern as Lieutenant Billy Byron Bix
- Michael Conrad as Sergeant DeVaca
- Caterina Boratto as Red Queen
- Olga Bisera as the Baker's Wife

== Production ==
The film's castle scenes were shot in Kamenica Park of Sremska Kamenica, while the street scenes were shot in Podgrađe of Petrovaradin, all in the city of Novi Sad, Yugoslavia (modern day Serbia). Sydney Pollack recalled that Burt Lancaster first wished him to direct the film in 1966; and that the castle, which was made of styrofoam, was inspired by Walt Disney and dreams. It later burned down in a fire.

== Release ==
The film opened at the Loew's State II and Loew's Orpheum theatres in New York City on July 23, 1969, grossing $94,000 in its first week.

== Reception ==
John Russell Taylor of The Times wrote in his review of the film, "Castle Keep is a curious and, on balance, rather appealing mixture of eccentricity and cliché."

== See also ==
- List of American films of 1969
