= Curtis Harnack =

American writer

Curtis Arthur Harnack (June 27, 1927 – July 5, 2013) was an American writer.

== Early life ==
Born June 27, 1927, Harnack grew up on a family farm in Remsen, Iowa. He studied English at Grinnell College before completing a master's degree at Columbia University. He began a career in teaching, initially at his alma mater Grinnell College, and then at Sarah Lawrence College in New York. During this time, he was also involved in the University of Iowa Writers' Workshop.

== Career ==
He was involved with the artists' community Yaddo in Saratoga Springs, New York, serving as the community's president between 1971 and 1987. His works include the novels The Work of an Ancient Hand (1960) and Limits of the Land (1979), and the memoirs We Have All Gone Away (1973) and The Attic (1993).

== Personal life ==
Harnack was married to writer Hortense Calisher. He died at his home in Manhattan on July 5, 2013.
