= The Best American Short Stories 1986 =

1986 short story collection

The Best American Short Stories 1988
- Editor: Shannon Ravenel and Raymond Carver
- Language: English
- Series: The Best American Short Stories
- Published: 1986
- Publisher: Houghton Mifflin Harcourt
- Media type: Print (hardback & paperback)
- Pages: 325
- ISBN: 0395383986
- Preceded by: The Best American Short Stories 1985
- Followed by: The Best American Short Stories 1987

The Best American Short Stories 1986, a volume in The Best American Short Stories series, was edited by guest editor Raymond Carver with Shannon Ravenel.

== Reception ==
The Kirkus Reviews’ reviewer of Carver’s anthology expressed disappointment in this year’s edition and concluded that there were only two "standout exceptions to the general fog, though—and their work should be looked for with real curiosity in the future. But, otherwise, tired nags ran this course, on the whole."

Short story writer and creative writing instructor K. L. Cook credits this anthology with his discovery and later acquaintance with Charles Baxter, one of the contributors, as well as his life-long addition to many other short story writers he first read in this volume. In a review of the collection and selected entries for the Florida Flambeau, Robyn Allers notes that not only does the volume contain some "real gems", but also "more important to short story fans, collections like this one … introduce readers to new writers who haven’t yet achieved the recognition that accompanies frequent publication in the mass-market glossies like The New Yorker, Esquire and The Atlantic." In The Boston Phoenix reviewer Tim Appelo noted that "It’s heartening to see up-and-comers crowd out big names, because it makes the collection fresher. These writers are young and hungry, and most of their work hits the spot."

== Short stories included ==
| Author | Story | Source |
|---|---|---|
| Donald Barthelme | "Basil from Her Garden" | The New Yorker |
| Charles Baxter | "Gryphon" | Epoch |
| Ann Beattie | "Janus" | The New Yorker |
| James Lee Burke | "The Convict" | The Kenyon Review |
| Ethan Canin | "Star Food" | Chicago |
| Frank Conroy | "Gossip" | Esquire |
| Richard Ford | "Communist" | Antaeus |
| Tess Gallagher | "Bad Company" | Ploughshares |
| Amy Hempel | "Today Will Be a Quiet Day" | The Missouri Review |
| David Michael Kaplan | "Doe Season" | The Atlantic |
| David Lipsky | "Three Thousand Dollars" | The New Yorker |
| Thomas McGuane | "Sportsmen" | Playboy |
| Christopher McIlroy | "All My Relations" | TriQuarterly |
| Alice Munro | "Monsieur les Deux Chapeaux" | Grand Street |
| Jessica Neely | "Skin Angels" | New England Review and Bread Loaf Quarterly |
| Kent Nelson | "Invisible Life" | The Virginia Quarterly Review |
| Grace Paley | "Telling" | Mother Jones |
| Mona Simpson | "Lawns" | The Iowa Review |
| Joy Williams | "Health" | Tendril |
| Tobias Wolff | "The Rich Brother" | Vanity Fair |
