= Alfred Chester =

American writer (1928–1971)

Alfred Chester (September 7, 1928 – August 1, 1971) was an American writer known for his provocative, experimental work, including the novels Jamie Is My Heart's Desire and The Exquisite Corpse and the short story collection Behold Goliath.

== Early life ==
Chester was born in Flatbush in Brooklyn, New York. X-rays used to treat childhood illness left him bald, and he wore a wig, which though noticeable was not something that people felt comfortable mentioning. He was educated at Orthodox Jewish yeshiva. He attended New York University where he met fellow writers Cynthia Ozick (who later wrote about him in her book Fame & Folly), Sol Yurick and Edward Field (who wrote "The Man Who Would Marry Susan Sontag" which has many chapters dedicated to the biography and literary career of Alfred Chester).

== Career ==
He attended graduate school at Columbia University but dropped out. He lived in France for most of the 1950s as an openly gay man. In 1952 his essay "Silence in Heaven" was published in Marguerite Caetani's literary review Botteghe oscure. (Caetani was the U.S.-born wife of an Italian nobleman.) Chester wrote a pornographic novel, Chariot of Flesh, for Olympia Press, using the pseudonym Malcolm Nesbit.

His first collection of short stories, Here Be Dragons, was published in 1955. His novel Jamie Is My Heart's Desire was initially published in a French translation, then in an English edition by the British publisher André Deutsch, and only later appeared in the United States. With Caetani's support, he received a Guggenheim Fellowship in 1957. His short story "As I Was Going Up the Stair" was included in Best American Short Stories.

Starting in 1959, his short fiction was published in magazines such as The New Yorker, Esquire, and Transatlantic Review. His often virulent literary criticism appeared in the New York Review of Books, Partisan Review, and Commentary. He returned to the United States and met Susan Sontag through Harriet Sohmers and María Irene Fornés.

Chester moved to Morocco in 1963. His short story collection Behold Goliath was published in 1964, and his novel The Exquisite Corpse was published in 1967. He associated with Paul Bowles and Jane Bowles while in Morocco, but eventually fell out with both of them.

== Later life ==
Increasingly, his behavior was made erratic by a combination of mental illness and drug use. It is uncertain if he was ever formally diagnosed, but based on his symptoms, he is believed to have suffered from paranoid schizophrenia, the first symptoms of which he displayed in 1958 at age 30 at the MacDowell Artists Colony in New Hampshire. He died of a drug overdose in Israel in 1971. His later writing was published posthumously in collections such as Looking for Genet.

== Works ==
=== Novels ===
- Chariot of Flesh (1955, as Malcolm Nesbit)
- Jamie Is My Heart’s Desire (1956)
- The Exquisite Corpse (1967)

=== Short fiction collections ===
- Here Be Dragons (1955)
- Behold Goliath (1964)
- Head of a Sad Angel: Stories 1953-1966 (1990)

=== Other collections ===
- Looking for Genet: Literary Essays & Reviews (1992)
- Voyage to Destruction: The Moroccan Letters of Alfred Chester (2022)

=== Short stories ===
Title	Publication	Collected in
"A Dance for Dead Lovers"	Merlin 1 (Spring 1952)	Here Be Dragons
"Here Be Dragons"	The Paris Review 4 (Winter 1953)	Here Be Dragons
"Rapunzel, Rapunzel"	Botteghe Oscure 12 (1953)	Here Be Dragons
"The Head of a Sad Angel"	Botteghe Oscure 14 (Autumn 1954)	Here Be Dragons
"As I Was Going Up the Stair"	The Sewanee Review (April–June 1957)	Behold Goliath
"A War on Salamis"	The New Yorker (April 25, 1959)	Head of a Sad Angel: Stories 1953-1966
"Cradle Song" aka "Berceuse"	Esquire (May 1960)	Behold Goliath
"Ismael"	The Transatlantic Review 7 (Fall 1961)	Behold Goliath
"Beds and Boards"	The New Yorker (March 10, 1962)	Behold Goliath
"Behold Goliath"	Provincetown Review 4 (1961)	Behold Goliath
"In Praise of Vespasian"	Second Coming 1.2 (July 1961)	Behold Goliath
"Two Fables"	"The Victory": Evergreen Review 18 (May–June 1961) "The Frog": The Transatlantic Review 11 (Winter 1962)	Behold Goliath
"From the Phoenix to the Unnameable, Impossibly Beautiful Wild Bird"	Behold Goliath (1964)	Behold Goliath
"Glory Hole"	Evergreen Review 35 (March 1965)	Head of a Sad Angel: Stories 1953-1966
"The Foot"	New American Review 9 (April 1970)	Head of a Sad Angel: Stories 1953-1966
"Safari"	New American Review 15 (1972)	Head of a Sad Angel: Stories 1953-1966
