= Beth Nugent =

American writer and academic

Beth Nugent (born c. 1958) is an American writer and academic.

She received her BA from Connecticut College in 1978, and her MFA from the University of Iowa in 1982.

Nugent has published two books: City of Boys (1992), a collection of short stories, and Live Girls (1996), a novel.

Since 1998, she has been an associate professor in the writing program at the School of the Art Institute of Chicago.
