= The Best American Short Stories =

Short story collections

- 1978 edition
- Language: English
- Series: The Best American Short Stories

The Best American Short Stories (BASS) is a yearly anthology that is part of The Best American Series published by Houghton Mifflin Harcourt. Since 1915, Best American Short Stories has anthologized more than 2,000 short stories, including works by some of the most famous writers in contemporary American literature. Along with the O. Henry Awards, Best American Short Stories is one of the two "best-known annual anthologies of short fiction."

== 1915-1941: Origin and early history under Edward O'Brien ==
The series began in 1915, when Edward O'Brien edited his selection of the previous year's stories. This first edition was serialized in a magazine; however, it caught the attention of the publishing company Small, Maynard & Company, which published subsequent editions until 1926, when the title was transferred to Dodd, Mead and Company.

The time appeared to be a propitious one for such a collection. The most popular magazines of the day featured short fiction prominently and frequently; the best authors were well-known and well-paid. More importantly, there was a nascent movement toward higher standards and greater experimentation among certain American writers. O'Brien capitalized on this moment. He was deeply and vocally skeptical of the value of commercial short fiction, which tended to the formulaic and sentimental; he insisted, in introduction after introduction, on the need for a consciously literary development of the short story. He used his selections to reinforce this call. Over the years of his editorship, he drew attention to two generations of American authors, from Sherwood Anderson and Edna Ferber to Richard Wright and Irwin Shaw. Perhaps the most significant instance of O'Brien's instincts involves Ernest Hemingway; O'Brien anthologized that author's "My Old Man" when it had not even been published yet, and was, moreover, instrumental in finding an American publisher for In Our Time. (He also dedicated the 1923 edition to the young author, while misspelling his name “Hemenway.”) O'Brien was known to work indefatigably: he claimed to read around 8,000 stories a year, and his editions contained lengthy tabulations of stories and magazines, ranked on a scale of three stars (representing O'Brien's notion of their "literary permanence").

Though the series attained a degree of fame and popularity, it was never universally accepted. Fans of the period's popular fiction often found his selections precious or willfully obscure. On the other hand, many critics who accepted "literary" fiction objected to O'Brien's occasionally strident and pedantic tone. After his death, for instance, The New Yorker compared him to the recently deceased editor of the Social Register, suggesting that they shared a form of snobbery.

== 1941-1978: Editorship of Martha Foley ==
O'Brien died of a heart attack in London in 1941. He was replaced as editor of the series by Martha Foley, founder and former editor of Story magazine. O'Brien, who had once called Story one of the most important events in literary history since the publication of Lyrical Ballads, presumably would have approved the choice. Foley edited the publication, at first alone and then with the assistance of her son, David Burnett, until 1977. These years witnessed both the ascendancy and eclipse of the type of short story favored by O'Brien: writers as diverse as John Cheever, Bernard Malamud, Joyce Carol Oates, and Tillie Olsen offered sharply observed, generally realistic stories that eschewed trite conventions. At the same time, Foley evinced some degree of awareness of the new currents in fiction. Donald Barthelme, for instance, was chosen for The School in 1976. Foley also attended to the rise of so-called minority literature, dedicating the 1975 volume to Leslie Marmon Silko, although it has been argued that the series was less perceptive in this area than it might have been.

== Since 1978 ==
After Foley's death, the publisher—by that time, Houghton Mifflin—elected to take the series in a new direction. Under the guidance of a series editor (Shannon Ravenel 1978–1990, Katrina Kenison 1991–2006, Heidi Pitlor 2007–2024, Nicole A. Lamy 2025–), a different writer of reputation would select the contents and introduce the volume each year. The editor would choose the best twenty stories from 120 stories recommended by the series editor. This format has been followed since, although the guest editor has occasionally gone beyond what the series editor recommended (e.g., John Gardner in 1982).

In 2002, Houghton-Mifflin made the series part of its broader Best American series.

== The Best American Short Stories of the Century; 100 Years of The Best American Short Stories ==
In 2000, John Updike selected 22 unabridged stories from the first 84 annual volumes of The Best American Short Stories, and the result is The Best American Short Stories of the Century. The expanded CD audio edition includes a new story from The Best American Short Stories 1999 to round out the century. In 2015, Lorrie Moore served as the guest editor for a centennial anthology from the series, 100 Years of The Best American Short Stories.

== Critical reception ==
The Best American Short Stories series "became a repository of values" with relation to university creative writing programs and literary magazines, and has "exerted influence" in college libraries, short fiction courses, and fiction workshops.

Many of the individual volumes of the series have been highly praised while The Best American Short Stories of the Century, which reprinted stories from volumes published during the 20th century, was called a "spectacular tapestry of fictional achievement."

It has also been noted that the individual volumes provide a running judgement of tastes regarding short stories across the decades. As critic Richard Eder wrote in The New York Times in 1999, "Instead of a strictly contemporary judgment we have a running one: These were the stories that judges in the 1930's, 40's and 50's chose. We get a sense of how we and our writers have changed. And we avoid the deadly ahistorical numbness of ourselves talking to ourselves.

== Guest editors ==
=== 1978–1989 ===
- 1978: Ted Solotaroff
- 1979: Joyce Carol Oates
- 1980: Stanley Elkin
- 1981: Hortense Calisher
- 1982: John Gardner
- 1983: Anne Tyler
- 1984: John Updike
- 1985: Gail Godwin
- 1986: Raymond Carver
- 1987: Ann Beattie
- 1988: Mark Helprin
- 1989: Margaret Atwood

=== 1990–1999 ===
- 1990: Richard Ford
- 1991: Alice Adams
- 1992: Robert Stone
- 1993: Louise Erdrich
- 1994: Tobias Wolff
- 1995: Jane Smiley
- 1996: John Edgar Wideman
- 1997: Annie Proulx
- 1998: Garrison Keillor
- 1999: Amy Tan

=== 2000–2009 ===
- 2000: E. L. Doctorow
- 2001: Barbara Kingsolver
- 2002: Sue Miller
- 2003: Walter Mosley
- 2004: Lorrie Moore
- 2005: Michael Chabon
- 2006: Ann Patchett
- 2007: Stephen King
- 2008: Salman Rushdie
- 2009: Alice Sebold

=== 2010–2019 ===
- 2010: Richard Russo
- 2011: Geraldine Brooks
- 2012: Tom Perrotta
- 2013: Elizabeth Strout
- 2014: Jennifer Egan
- 2015: T. C. Boyle
- 2016: Junot Díaz
- 2017: Meg Wolitzer
- 2018: Roxane Gay
- 2019: Anthony Doerr

=== 2020–present ===
- 2020: Curtis Sittenfeld
- 2021: Jesmyn Ward
- 2022: Andrew Sean Greer
- 2023: Min Jin Lee
- 2024: Lauren Groff
- 2025: Celeste Ng
- 2026: Viet Thanh Nguyen

== Anthologies ==
=== 1940s ===
- The Best American Short Stories 1942
- The Best American Short Stories 1943
- The Best American Short Stories 1944
- The Best American Short Stories 1945
- The Best American Short Stories 1946
- The Best American Short Stories 1947
- The Best American Short Stories 1948
- The Best American Short Stories 1949

=== 1950s ===
- The Best American Short Stories 1950
- The Best American Short Stories 1951
- The Best American Short Stories 1952
- The Best American Short Stories 1953
- The Best American Short Stories 1954
- The Best American Short Stories 1955
- The Best American Short Stories 1956
- The Best American Short Stories 1957
- The Best American Short Stories 1958
- The Best American Short Stories 1959

=== 1960s ===
- The Best American Short Stories 1960
- The Best American Short Stories 1961
- The Best American Short Stories 1962
- The Best American Short Stories 1963
- The Best American Short Stories 1964
- The Best American Short Stories 1965
- The Best American Short Stories 1966
- The Best American Short Stories 1967
- The Best American Short Stories 1968
- The Best American Short Stories 1969

=== 1970s ===
- The Best American Short Stories 1970
- The Best American Short Stories 1971
- The Best American Short Stories 1972
- The Best American Short Stories 1973
- The Best American Short Stories 1974
- The Best American Short Stories 1975
- The Best American Short Stories 1976
- The Best American Short Stories 1977
- The Best American Short Stories 1978
- The Best American Short Stories 1979

=== 1980s ===
- The Best American Short Stories 1980
- The Best American Short Stories 1981
- The Best American Short Stories 1982
- The Best American Short Stories 1983
- The Best American Short Stories 1984
- The Best American Short Stories 1985
- The Best American Short Stories 1986
- The Best American Short Stories 1987
- The Best American Short Stories 1988
- The Best American Short Stories 1989

=== 1990s ===
- The Best American Short Stories 1990
- The Best American Short Stories 1991
- The Best American Short Stories 1992
- The Best American Short Stories 1993
- The Best American Short Stories 1994
- The Best American Short Stories 1995
- The Best American Short Stories 1996
- The Best American Short Stories 1997
- The Best American Short Stories 1998
- The Best American Short Stories 1999

=== 2000s ===
- The Best American Short Stories 2000
- The Best American Short Stories 2001
- The Best American Short Stories 2002
- The Best American Short Stories 2003
- The Best American Short Stories 2004
- The Best American Short Stories 2005
- The Best American Short Stories 2006
- The Best American Short Stories 2007
- The Best American Short Stories 2008
- The Best American Short Stories 2009

=== 2010s ===
- The Best American Short Stories 2010
- The Best American Short Stories 2011
- The Best American Short Stories 2012
- The Best American Short Stories 2013
- The Best American Short Stories 2014
- The Best American Short Stories 2015
- The Best American Short Stories 2016
- The Best American Short Stories 2017
- The Best American Short Stories 2018
- The Best American Short Stories 2019

=== 2020s ===
- The Best American Short Stories 2020
- The Best American Short Stories 2021
- The Best American Short Stories 2022
- The Best American Short Stories 2023
- The Best American Short Stories 2024

== See also ==
- O. Henry Award
