= Hortense Calisher =

American novelist (1911–2009)

- Born: December 20, 1911; New York City, U.S.
- Died: January 13, 2009 (aged 97); New York City, U.S.
- Education: Barnard College
- Occupation: Novelist
- Writing career
- Pen name: Jack Fenno
- Period: 1951–2004

Hortense Calisher (December 20, 1911 – January 13, 2009) was an American writer of fiction and the second female president of the American Academy of Arts and Letters.

== Life and career ==
=== Background ===
Born in New York City, and a graduate of Hunter College High School (1928) and Barnard College (1932), Calisher was the daughter of a young German Jewish immigrant mother and a somewhat older Jewish father from Virginia whose family she described as "volcanic to meditative to fruitfully dull and bound to produce someone interested in character, society, and time".

In 1972, she was a part of the Ms. magazine campaign: “We Have Had Abortions.” The campaign called for an end to "archaic laws" limiting reproductive freedom and encouraged women to share their stories and take action.

=== Writing style ===
Calisher involved her closely investigated, penetrating characters in complicated plotlines that unfold with shocks and surprises in allusive, nuanced language with a distinctively elegiac voice, sometimes compared with Eudora Welty, Charles Dickens, Jane Austen, and Henry James. Critics generally considered Calisher a type of neo-realist and often both condemned and praised her for her extensive explorations of characters and their social worlds. Her writing was at odds with the prevailing minimalism typical of fiction writing in the 1970s and 1980s that employed a spartan, nonromantic style without undue expressionism.

The New York Times opined that her "unpredictable turns of phrase, intellectually challenging fictional situations and complex plots captivated and puzzled readers for a half-century. Failure and isolation were themes that ran through her 23 novels and short-story collections: failure of love, marriage, communication, identity. She explored the isolation within families that cannot be avoided yet cannot be faced, isolation imposed by wounds inflicted even in the happiest of households, wounds that shape events for generations. But her peers seemed most intrigued by her distinctive way of telling a story, her filigreed sentences and bold stylistic excursions... Throughout her career as a novelist, opinion tended to split evenly among critics who found her prose style and approach to narrative better suited to short stories [and those who] were mesmerized by her idiosyncratic language and imaginative daring."

=== Honors and awards ===
Calisher became the second female president of the American Academy of Arts and Letters in 1987. From 1986 to 1987 she was president of PEN America, the writers' association.

She was a finalist for the National Book Award three times, won O. Henry Awards (for "The Night Club in the Woods" and other works) and the 1986 Janet Heidinger Kafka Prize (for The Bobby Soxer), and was awarded Guggenheim Fellowships in 1952 and 1955. She was elected a Fellow of the American Academy of Arts and Sciences in 1997.

== Death ==
Calisher died on January 13, 2009, aged 97, in Manhattan. She was survived by her husband, Curtis Harnack, and her son, Peter Heffelfinger, from her first marriage to Heaton Bennet Heffelfinger. Calisher was predeceased by her daughter, Bennet Heffelfinger.

== Bibliography ==
=== Fiction ===
- In the Absence of Angels (short stories 1951)
- False Entry (novel 1961)
- Tale for the Mirror (novella and short stories 1962)
- Textures of Life (novel 1963)
- Extreme Magic (novella and short stories 1964)
- Journal from Ellipsia (novel 1965)
- The Railway Police and The Last Trolley Ride (novellas 1966)
- The New Yorkers (novel 1969)
- Queenie (novel 1971)
- Standard Dreaming (novel 1972)
- Eagle Eye (novel 1973)
- The Collected Stories of Hortense Calisher (1975, revised 1984)
- On Keeping Women (novel 1977)
- Mysteries of Motion (novel 1983)
- Saratoga, Hot (novella and short stories 1985)
- The Bobby-Soxer (novel 1986)
- Age (novel 1987)
- The Small Bang (novel under the pseudonym of Jack Fenno 1992)
- In the Palace of the Movie King (novel 1993)
- In the Slammer with Carol Smith (novel 1997)
- The Novellas of Hortense Calisher (1997)
- Sunday Jews (novel 2003)

=== Non-fiction ===
- Herself (autobiography, 1972)
- Kissing Cousins: A Memory (memoir, 1988)
- Tattoo for a Slave (memoir, 2004)

=== Short stories and novellas ===
Title	Publication	Collected in
"The Middle Drawer"	The New Yorker (July 10, 1948)	In the Absence of Angels
"Point of Departure"	Harper's Bazaar (September 1948)	In the Absence of Angels
"The Pool of Narcissus"	The New Yorker (September 25, 1948)	In the Absence of Angels
"A Box of Ginger"	The New Yorker (October 16, 1948)	In the Absence of Angels
"One of the Chosen"	Harper's Magazine (December 1948)	In the Absence of Angels
"The Watchers"	The New Yorker (March 26, 1949)	In the Absence of Angels
"The Woman Who Was Everybody"	Mademoiselle (February 1950)	In the Absence of Angels
"In Greenwich There Are Many Graveled Walks"	The New Yorker (August 12, 1950)	In the Absence of Angels
"Old Stock"	The New Yorker (September 30, 1950)	In the Absence of Angels
"Heartburn"	New American Mercury (January 1951)	In the Absence of Angels
"In the Absence of Angels"	The New Yorker (April 21, 1951)	In the Absence of Angels
"A Wreath for Miss Totten"	Mademoiselle (July 1951)	In the Absence of Angels
"Night Riders of Northville"	Harper's Magazine (September 1951)	In the Absence of Angels
"Letitia, Emeritus"	In the Absence of Angels (November 1951)	In the Absence of Angels
"The Sound of Waiting"	In the Absence of Angels (November 1951)	In the Absence of Angels
"The Hollow Boy"	Harper's Magazine (October 1952)	Tale for the Mirror
"The Seacoast of Bohemia"	Charm (October 1952)	Tale for the Mirror
"Saturday Night"	Discovery #1, ed. Vance Bourjaily (February 1953)	Tale for the Mirror
"So Many Rings to the Show"	The New Yorker (May 16, 1953)	Tale for the Mirror
"The Coreopsis Kid"	Charm (July 1953)	Tale for the Mirror
"The Rabbi's Daughter"	Charm (1953)	Extreme Magic
"A Christmas Carillon"	Harper's Magazine (December 1953)	Extreme Magic
"If You Don't Want to Live I Can't Help You"	Mademoiselle (October 1954)	Extreme Magic
"The Night Club in the Woods"	Discovery #5 (March 1955)	Tale for the Mirror
"Tale for the Mirror"	Harper's Bazaar (May 1955)	Tale for the Mirror
"Il Plœ:r Dã Mõ Kœ:r"	The New Yorker (September 8, 1956)	Extreme Magic
"Time, Gentlemen!"	Harper's Bazaar (December 1956)	Tale for the Mirror
"Two Colonials"	Harper's Bazaar (April 1957)	Extreme Magic
"What a Thing, to Keep a Wolf in a Cage!"	Mademoiselle (April 1957)	Tale for the Mirror
"The Rehabilitation of Ginevra Leake"	New World Writing #12 (November 1957)	Tale for the Mirror
"Songs My Mother Taught Me" a.k.a. "The Geste Courteous"	Harper's Bazaar (January 1959)	Extreme Magic
"Mrs. Fay Dines on Zebra"	Ladies' Home Journal (October 1960)	Tale for the Mirror
"May-ry"	The Reporter (March 30, 1961)	Tale for the Mirror
"The Scream on Fifty-Seventh Street"	Harper's Bazaar (September 1962)	Tale for the Mirror
"Little Did I Know"	Saturday Evening Post (June 8, 1963)	Extreme Magic
"The Gulf Between"	Gentlemen's Quarterly (1964)	Extreme Magic
"Extreme Magic"	Extreme Magic (April 1964)	Extreme Magic
"Gargantua"	Harper's Bazaar (February 1965)	Saratoga, Hot
"The Railway Police"	The Railway Police and the Last Trolley Ride (May 1966)	The Railway Police and the Last Trolley Ride
"The Last Trolley Ride"	The Railway Police and the Last Trolley Ride (May 1966)	The Railway Police and the Last Trolley Ride
"Fathers and Satyrs"	Evergreen Review (December 1966)	-
"The Summer Rebellion" a.k.a. "A Summer Psychosis"	Harper's Bazaar (September 1967)	The Collected Stories of Hortense Calisher
"Real Impudence"	Saratoga, Hot (May 1985)	Saratoga, Hot
"The Library"	Saratoga, Hot (May 1985)	Saratoga, Hot
"The Sound Track"	Saratoga, Hot (May 1985)	Saratoga, Hot
"The Passenger"	Saratoga, Hot (May 1985)	Saratoga, Hot
"The Tenth Child"	Saratoga, Hot (May 1985)	Saratoga, Hot
"Survival Techniques"	Saratoga, Hot (May 1985)	Saratoga, Hot
"Saratoga, Hot"	Saratoga, Hot (May 1985)	Saratoga, Hot
"The Gig"	Confrontation (Fall 1986)	-
"The Eversham's Willie"	Southwest Review (Summer 1987)	-
"The Man Who Spat Silver"	Confrontation (Summer 1989)	-
"The Nature of the Madhouse"	Story (Spring 1990)	-
"What Country Is This?"	American Short Fiction #1 (Spring 1991)	-
"The Iron Butterflies"	Southwest Review (1992)	-
"Blind Eye, Wrong Foot"	American Short Fiction #10 (Summer 1993)	-
"Women Men Don't Talk About"	The Novellas of Hortense Calisher (January 1998)	The Novellas of Hortense Calisher
