= William Eastlake =

American novelist

- Born: July 14, 1917; Brooklyn, New York
- Died: June 1, 1997 (aged 79); Bisbee, Arizona
- Occupations: Writer; novelist; film director; screenwriter
- Writing career
- Genre: Fiction

William Eastlake (July 14, 1917 in Brooklyn, New York – June 1, 1997 Bisbee, Arizona) was an American writer. His Checkerboard Trilogy, consisting of the works Go in Beauty (1956), The Bronc People (1958), and Portrait of an Artist with Twenty-Six Horses (1963) was included by literary critic Larry McCaffery in his list of the 20th Century's Greatest Hits: 100 English-Language Books of Fiction.

== Life ==
Eastlake was born of British parents in Brooklyn, and grew up in Caldwell, New Jersey. As an infant he and his older brother Gordon were sent to Bonnie Brae, an Episcopal boarding school in nearby Liberty Corners, New Jersey, which he called Prettyfields, which he features in his 1969 novel The Bamboo Bed.

In the early 1940s, he worked at the Stanley Rose Bookstore in Los Angeles, California, which was a literary hangout for writers Nathanael West, Clifford Odets, Theodore Dreiser, William Saroyan, John Steinbeck et al. He also worked as a reporter, covering the story of a lynching in Mississippi, where he visited writer William Faulkner. In 1943 he married painter Martha Simpson (1898–1984).

In 1942, Eastlake joined the U.S. Army, and was stationed at Camp MacArthur and Camp Ord in California, followed by Camp White in Oregon. After the Pearl Harbor Attack, all Japanese draftees in the U.S. Army were sent to Camp Ord, where Eastlake was given the job of "looking after them", writing "I never knew a more pro-American, patriotic group than those Japanese-American soldiers." Eastlake would obligingly take photographs of them to send to their relatives "in the euphemistic 'relocation' camps." Eventually the troops were placed into a separate combat unit and sent off to war. "They fought and died with the best of them while their parents languished in concentration camps," Eastlake wrote. His frustration and anger over this experience are portrayed in his first novel Ishimoto's Land, which remains unpublished. "The publishers told me it was too early for a book about this American tragedy. The public is not ready for it yet."

Later Eastlake was transferred to a reinforcement company in England, where his job was "to process and instruct" newly arrived troops, including acclimatizing them to British customs. His unit then landed at Omaha Beach, after which he fought in France and Belgium, and was a platoon leader when wounded in the right shoulder in the 1944 Battle of the Bulge, receiving a steel plate that hampered movement of his arm. Though he was awarded the Bronze Star for his service, he repeatedly declined to talk about it; companion Marilyn Hill explained that he was embarrassed by the fact that it wasn't enemy fire that wounded him, but his own gun that had misfired, blasting shrapnel into his shoulder.

After the war ended, Eastlake accepted an invitation to join an army buddy in Switzerland and start a small literary magazine. Unfortunately, the backer withdrew support after only one issue, so the Eastlakes moved to Paris, where Martha had lived once before as an art student. The literary magazine Essai contains Eastlake's first published story, Ishimoto's Land.

In 1955 he bought a 400-acre ranch in the Jemez Mountains near Cuba, New Mexico, which became a mecca for writers Julian Huxley, Edward Abbey, Robert Creeley et al.

Eastlake's 1965 book Castle Keep, about U.S. soldiers trying to defend a Belgian castle filled with art treasures during the 1944 Battle of the Bulge was made into the 1969 movie Castle Keep, directed by Sydney Pollack, starring Burt Lancaster, Patrick O'Neal, Jean-Pierre Aumont, Bruce Dern, and Peter Falk.

== Works ==
=== Novels ===
- Go in Beauty (Harper & Brothers, 1956)
- The Bronc People (Harcourt, Brace, 1958)
- Portrait of an Artist with Twenty-Six Horses (Simon & Schuster, 1963)
- Castle Keep (Simon & Schuster, 1965)
- The Bamboo Bed (Simon & Schuster, 1969)
- Dancers in the Scalp House (Viking, 1975)
- The Long, Naked Descent into Boston (Viking, 1977)

=== Short works ===
- A Child's Garden of Verses for the Revolution (Grove, 1970)
- Jack Armstrong in Tangier, and Other Escapes (Bamberger, 1984)
- Prettyfields: A Work in Progress (Capra, 1987)

=== Collections ===
- 3 by Eastlake (Simon & Schuster, 1970)
- Lyric of the Circle Heart: The Bowman Family Trilogy (Dalkey Archive, 1996)
