= Warren Beck =

American politician

Warren Harris Beck

Member of the Alabama House of Representatives from the 87th district
- In office November 6, 2002 – February 24, 2010
- Preceded by: Riley Seibenhener
- Succeeded by: Donnie Chesteen

Personal details
- Born: May 2, 1944 Geneva, Alabama
- Died: February 24, 2010 (aged 65) Montgomery, Alabama
- Party: Republican

Warren Harris Beck (May 2, 1944 – February 24, 2010) was an American politician who served in the Alabama House of Representatives from the 87th district from 2002 to until his death in 2010.

He died on February 24, 2010, in Montgomery, Alabama at age 65.
