= Tamarack Review =

Literary magazine

The Tamarack Review was a Canadian literary magazine, published from 1956 to 1982. Established and edited by Robert Weaver, other figures associated with the magazine's editorial staff included Anne Wilkinson, William Toye and John Robert Colombo. In addition, Ivon Maclean Owen was among the founding editors. During the early years of the magazine, there was also an editorial advisory board made up of F.R. Scott, A.J.M. Smith, James Reaney, Alan Crawley, and George Woodcock. The magazine was published on a quarterly basis and had its headquarters in Toronto.

Tamarack Review published literature in a wide variety of genres, including fiction, poetry, travel memoirs, autobiography, literary criticism and drama. However, the magazine also covered the best examples of contemporary poetry.

In 1962, an anthology of work collected from the Tamarack Review was published, entitled The First Five Years. In the introduction, Robert Fulford gives a good picture of the role of the magazine in the early years. He claims that the founders of the magazine represented what was then Toronto's literary establishment. Their careers—one poet, three publishing-house editors, one academic, and one CBC program organizer—give an apt sense of what the literary establishment of the time was like. He continues:

We can assume that one of their purposes in starting the magazine was to stop talking almost exclusively to each other and begin addressing a somewhat larger world. Six years later it might seem, on the surface, that in this respect the Tamarack is a failure. It has never sold more than twelve hundred copies, and (except in some small, peculiar circles) has not become a fashionable magazine for coffee-table display. Nor is it profitable; editors, in fact, have had to make up its deficit out of their own pockets, and the Canada Council's steady assistance has now become almost a necessity of survival. But these facts are deceptive. The Tamarack has won, over the years, an influence that is, as they say, out of all proportion to its circulation. Poets send it their best poems, fiction writers offer it their best stories, critics labour for it with glad heart. Publishers read it, and so do magazine editors, and so do many of the most eminent citizens of the country. Only a contributor can know how true this is: one article I wrote for the Tamarack four years ago has been mentioned to me more often, and discussed more widely, than many piece I have written for publications which have a thousand times as many readers. Tamarack readers, I have learned, read carefully and remember well.

Notable writers whose early work was published in Tamarack include Timothy Findley, Hugh Hood, Alice Munro, Jay Macpherson and Mordecai Richler.
