= Harvey Swados =

American novelist

- Born: October 28, 1920; Buffalo, New York, US
- Died: December 11, 1972 (aged 52); Chesterfield, Massachusetts, US
- Occupation: Novelist
- Relatives: Richard Hofstadter (brother-in-law)
- Writing career
- Period: 20th century
- Genre: Naturalism
- Subject: Contemporary life

Harvey Swados (October 28, 1920 – December 11, 1972) was an American social critic and author of novels, short stories, essays and journalism.

== Family and early life ==
Born in Buffalo, New York, Harvey Swados was the son of Aaron Meyer Swados, a physician, and Rebecca (Bluestone) Swados, a musician and artist whose father was a pioneer Zionist. Both parents' backgrounds were European Jewish. Almost uniformly, uncles, aunts and cousins on both sides of his family were degreed professionals—doctors, dentists, lawyers—but Swados aspired from an early age to a writer's life.

Simultaneous with an upper-middle-class upbringing, Swados developed an acute awareness of his social surroundings. During his childhood and early adolescent years in Buffalo during the Great Depression, he often witnessed his father treating unemployed patients without charging a fee. In 1936, at the age of 15, Swados enrolled at the University of Michigan at Ann Arbor, where he won a Hopwood Award for creative writing.

"His career really began with the publication, in Contemporary, the literary quarterly at the University of Michigan, of a short story, 'The Amateurs.' Written when Swados was just 16, 'The Amateurs' was reprinted in The Best Short Stories of 1938, where it appeared alongside stories by Robert Penn Warren, John Steinbeck, Eudora Welty, John Cheever and Mark Schorer."

Strongly influenced by the political and social convictions of his sister Felice Swados (who had many discussions at the Hunter Colony run by Margaret Lefranc), and while still an undergraduate, Swados also initiated during this period what was to become a lengthy relationship with the anti-Stalinist American Left and, by the late 1930s, had affiliated himself with the Leon Trotsky–inspired and Max Shachtman–led Workers Party (U.S.), whose adherents included novelist James T. Farrell and democratic socialist theorist, literary critic and social historian Irving Howe.

Following his university graduation in 1940, Swados returned to Buffalo, where he worked as a riveter at defense contractor Bell Aircraft, passed through a brief first marriage and, following his sister, moved to New York City, where he took another factory job at the bustling Brewster Aviation plant in Long Island City, just across the East River from Manhattan. A graduate of Smith College in Northampton, Massachusetts, Felice had married American historian Richard Hofstadter in 1936 and was working as an editor at Time magazine by 1940. House of Fury, a novel by Felice Swados, was published in 1941.

Though he had already begun distancing himself from the Trotskyist organization by the beginning of the 1940s, Swados remained committed to principles of democratic socialism—exclusive of any party structure—and thought of himself as an independent radical for the rest of his life. "Despite his own drift away from the revolutionary expectations of his youth, much that would remain central to Swados's worldview was formed in these politically charged years of factory employment in the early 1940s." Experiences and friendships with the political group's adherents "he would later describe in Standing Fast, his 1970 novel that sympathetically recorded the exhilaration and despair of his political generation as it moved from the radical hopes of the late 1930s to a kind of acquiescent liberalism in the 1950s and 1960s."

== World War II and after ==
Serving as a radio operator, Swados joined the United States Merchant Marine in 1943. "His wartime service took him to the Mediterranean, the Caribbean, the North Atlantic, the South Pacific and to various ports of call on five continents." Those peripatetic experiences formed the basis for his first novel, The Unknown Constellations. Dissatisfied with its reception among friends and colleagues whose opinions he valued, and unable to place it with a publisher at that time, Swados set the work aside shortly after its creation in the 1940s. Its posthumous publication by the University of Illinois Press in 1995 served as a revelation into the concerns and social issues that were later to engage him throughout his working life.

After giving birth to her son Dan in 1943, Felice died of cancer in 1945 at age 29. Apart from the profound impact her death had on him, Swados, driven by his deep love for Felice and for her idealism, was more than ever determined to make his way as a writer.

In 1946, as he continued to launch his writing career, Swados married Bette Beller, with whom he had three children—son Marco in 1947, daughter Felice in 1949, who was named after Swados's late sister, and son Robin in 1953. During this period, Swados worked in several public relations jobs often having to do with fundraising initiatives on behalf of the nascent State of Israel. He found the office work frustrating, though, drawing as it did on many of the working hours and on many of the skills Swados wished to apply toward his own writing.

By the early 1950s, Swados and his family had moved from Brooklyn Heights to Greenwich Village in Manhattan, finally buying a home in then-rural Rockland County, New York, 25 miles north of New York City. On the commuter train between Rockland and Weehawken, New Jersey, on his way to and from his midtown Manhattan office job, Swados often did his own work, assembling his thoughts and writing his first published novel, Out Went the Candle, which was released in 1955.

== From the 1950s to the 1970s ==
Beginning in the mid-1950s, Swados's Rockland County life with Bette and his children was marked by renewed and burgeoning friendships with fellow residents from the arts and the professions. Perhaps the most profound of Swados's personal and professional relationships, though, was with his West Nyack, New York, neighbor, the sociologist, writer and Columbia University professor C. Wright Mills, whom Swados had met through Richard Hofstadter. Mills and Swados not only worked side by side on construction projects at one another's homes, but critiqued—sometimes passionately—one another's works in progress. Multi-hour discussions on politics and contemporary American culture characterized their relationship; the two frequently disagreed politically, most notably on the nature of the Castro revolution in Cuba. Their mutual friend, writer Dan Wakefield, observed that Swados's short stories "dramatized concerns such as Mills addressed in White Collar, like the threat to individual freedom from new technology and corporate conformity. . . . More than any other writer I knew, C. Wright Mills's friend and neighbor Harvey Swados embodied the search to live and do his work in a commercial world and maintain his commitment as an artist."

Beginning in the late 1950s, in addition to his literary and journalistic work, Swados began teaching at Sarah Lawrence College in Bronxville, New York, where writer Grace Paley was among his colleagues.

The family's residency in Rockland was punctuated by sojourns to the South of France and the Midwest and West Coast of the United States. Through the generosity of Rockland County friends who owned a modest villa there, Swados and his family resided, from 1955 to 1956, in the medieval Cote D'Azur village of Cagnes-sur-Mer, midway between Cannes and Nice. The semitropical setting became a much-loved second home to Swados—one to which he and his family returned for three one-year periods between the mid-1950s and the late 1960s. Returning to Rockland County from France in 1956, and unwilling to return to his marketing and public relations paychecks, Swados opted for a job at the newly constructed Ford Motor Company assembly plant in Mahwah, New Jersey. His experiences there formed the basis of his 1957 book of related short stories, On the Line.

In his introduction to the University of Illinois Press edition of On the Line, Nelson Lichtenstein wrote, "When Swados showed up at the Mahwah plant in February 1956, the personnel man was glad to see that he had had some blue collar work experience, but he also found his job application strangely full of blank spots. When asked what he had been doing, Swados dodged: 'Writing novels in the South of France.' This little joke seemed to satisfy, so he was promptly assigned to the assembly line as a metal finisher, the same job he had mastered in the early 1940s when working in Buffalo." Several years later, Lichtenstein wrote, Swados recounted his thoughts about having returned to the factory floor, rather than to an office, to earn a living. Before a U.S. Department of Labor seminar on Manpower Policy and Program, Swados commented, "Good Lord, here they are! I have forgotten all about them. They have been here all these years, making all of these things, and here I am with them, but now I know what it is all about." As he worked a night shift at Ford, Swados also spent days working on On the Line. In an enthusiastic letter to his friends Stuart and Barbara Schulberg, whom Swados and his wife had met in Cagnes-sur-Mer, he wrote, "I think when [the stories] are all done they will give an inkling of what has happened to the American dream. Even their titles are good!"

In 1957, Swados and his family decamped for a year to Iowa City, Iowa, where Swados was a faculty member at Paul Engle's Iowa Writers' Workshop, and where his colleagues included Vance Bourjaily and Herbert Gold. Several years later, beginning in 1960, Swados and his family spent a year in San Francisco, when he accepted an appointment to join the English faculty at San Francisco State University. There, his English Department colleagues included S. I. Hayakawa, who several years later was to become the university's controversial president.

In Rockland and elsewhere, while Swados's work on his novels and short stories formed the core of his creative life during the late 1950s and throughout the 1960s, he and his wife also spent many months abroad—in the Middle East, in Africa and in Central Europe—where Swados developed and filed stories, reviews and articles for publications ranging from The New Leader and Dissent to Esquire; from The Nation and New Politics to Playboy and The New York Times.

As examples of Swados's voluminous journalism, two pieces written for The New York Times Sunday Magazine in many ways typify his wide-ranging social curiosity. In an article published on November 13, 1966, "When Black and White Live Together," Swados presented the integrated community of Rochdale Village, in the New York City borough of Queens, as a paradigm of American brotherhood, idealism and economic self-interest. (Although the Rochdale example was short-lived, its history has been documented by former resident, author and editor Peter Eisenstadt.) In an article published on April 23, 1967, Swados profiled the maverick and unpredictable CBS News executive Fred Friendly.

In 1967, reporting on the Nigerian Civil War as a member of a delegation of American civilians, he visited the secessionist state of Biafra. There, he met and formed a lasting friendship with the writer Chinua Achebe, who later was to become Swados's colleague at the University of Massachusetts Amherst. That same year, Swados also reported from Jerusalem for The New York Times on the aftermath of the Six-Day War. In 1968, as a private citizen, he visited Czechoslovakia, with Bette and Robin, to familiarize himself with individuals who had participated in the political liberalization of the Prague Spring. Swados feared for his family's safety, though. He was strongly urged by members of the reformist Alexander Dubček government to depart the country, which the family was indeed forced to do, mere hours before the arrival of invading Russian troops.

== Final years and summary ==
In 1970, Swados and his wife left Rockland County behind, buying an old Colonial home in the village of Chesterfield, Massachusetts. He had decided to accept an appointment as Professor in the Department of English at the University of Massachusetts Amherst. In what was to be one of the final public acts of his political life, Swados traveled to Washington, D.C., in 1972 and volunteered his writing services to the presidential campaign of George McGovern and his running mate Sargent Shriver. Swados was putting the finishing touches on his final published work, the novel Celebration, when he was stricken by a cerebral aneurysm. His death occurred on December 11, 1972.

In a 1973 memorial tribute, the critic Hilton Kramer lauded his friend's "attention to all those aspects of our history and our feelings that our stylish literature, then in the high tide of its so-called radical phase, had either conveniently forgotten or never knew."

At the University of Massachusetts Amherst opening celebration in 1979, on the occasion of the deposit of the Harvey Swados papers in the university archives, Irving Howe said of his late colleague, "He is a writer free of public postures, indifferent to literary fads and totally devoted to perfection of his craft."

In her preface to the New York Review Books edition of Nights in the Gardens Of Brooklyn, Swados's friend and former Sarah Lawrence College office neighbor Grace Paley wrote: "Harvey was interested in good or almost good women and men more than most writers—and readers. By good people I don't mean saints or angels, but people who, for all their complexity, want to do the right thing. Luckily he was unsentimental. He had too much integrity to allow for the soft lies of sentiment. At some point in the stories in this collection the world is going to pick up his characters and drop them down. Their innocence—and ours—is going to take a beating."

== Published works ==
Novels

- Out Went the Candle (New York: Viking, 1955)
- False Coin (Boston: Atlantic/Little, Brown, 1959)
- The Will (Cleveland: World, 1963)
- Standing Fast (Garden City: Doubleday, 1970)
- Celebration (New York: Simon & Schuster, 1975)
- The Unknown Constellations (Urbana: University of Illinois Press, 1995)

Short story collections

- On the Line (Boston: Atlantic/Little, Brown, 1957)
- Nights in the Gardens of Brooklyn (Boston: Atlantic/Little, Brown, 1960)
- A Story for Teddy and Others (New York: Simon & Schuster, 1965)
- Nights in the Gardens of Brooklyn: The Collected Stories of Harvey Swados. Introduction by Robin Swados. (New York: Viking Penguin, 1986)

Essays

- A Radical’s America (Boston: Atlantic/Little, Brown, 1962)
- A Radical at Large: American Essays (London: Hart-Davis, 1968).

Edited works

- Years of Conscience: The Muckrakers (Cleveland: Meridian, 1962)
- The American Writer and the Great Depression (Indianapolis: Bobbs-Merrill, 1966)

Children's literature/Translations

- Agouhanna, by Claude Aubry. Translated from the French by Harvey Swados. Illustrated by Grey Cohoe. (Garden City, NY: Doubleday, 1971)
- Bim, The Little Donkey, by Albert Lamorisse. Translated from the French by Harvey and Bette Swados (Garden City, N.Y.: Doubleday, 1971)
- The Mystery of the Spanish Silver Mine (Garden City, N.Y.: Doubleday, 1971)

Biography

- Standing Up for the People: The Life and Work of Estes Kefauver (New York: Dutton, 1972)
