= New World Writing =

American literary magazine

- Categories: Literary magazine
- Format: Paperback
- Founded: 1951
- Final issue: 1964
- Company: New American Library (1951-1960); J. B. Lippincott & Co. (1960-1964)
- Country: United States
- Based in: New York City
- Language: English

New World Writing was a paperback magazine, a literary anthology series published by New American Library's Mentor imprint from 1951 until 1960, then J. B. Lippincott & Co.'s Keystone from volume/issue 16 (1960) to the last volume, 22, in 1964.

Rare Library described it as "one of the longest running and very significant paperback magazines in American literature. An institution that sprang up in the 1950s, showcasing original and first appearance of stories, poems, essays, etc. of leading writers from around the world. It has sometimes lapsed, but then returned to life, outlasting imitators in nearly every decade."

== Contributors ==
The fourth issue had two contributions by Gore Vidal, who had helped found New World Writing.

The seventh issue (1955) included the first chapter of Catch-22 (named Catch-18 originally) and "Jazz of the Beat Generation" by "Jean-Louis" (actually an excerpt from Jack Kerouac's On the Road). That issue also included work by Heinrich Böll and Dylan Thomas. The eighth issue (1955) featured Flannery O'Connor, Federico García Lorca and Thomas Berger. The first Lippincott volume, 16, was led off by Tillie Olsen's most famous story "Tell Me a Riddle" and included Thomas Pynchon's "Low-Lands"; New World Writing 17 (1960) included John Updike's "The Sea's Green Sameness", James Purdy's "Daddy Wolf", an essay by Otto Friedrich on Ezra Pound and Louise W. King's first published story, "The Day We Were Mostly Butterflies."

Other contributors included W. H. Auden, Samuel Beckett, Saul Bellow, Jorge Luis Borges, E. E. Cummings, William Gaddis, Jean Genet, André Gide, Eugène Ionesco, Christopher Isherwood, Shirley Jackson, Norman Mailer, Pablo Picasso, Henry Miller, Robert Motherwell, Octavio Paz, Kenneth Rexroth, Upton Sinclair, Tennessee Williams and William Carlos Williams.

The editors were Stewart Richardson and Corlies M. Smith. The cover design was by Ernst Reichl. It was succeeded in 1967 by New American Review, edited by Ted Solotaroff.

A purchase of the anthology was described in Frank O'Hara's poem "The Day Lady Died":

I walk up the muggy street beginning to sun
and have a hamburger and a malted and buy
an ugly NEW WORLD WRITING to see what the poets
in Ghana are doing these days

== See also ==
- List of literary magazines
