= The Georgia Review =

American literary magazine

- Discipline: Literary journal
- Language: English
- Edited by: Gerald Maa

Publication details
- History: 1947–present
- Publisher: University of Georgia (USA)
- Frequency: Quarterly

Standard abbreviations
- ISO 4: Ga. Rev.

Indexing
- ISSN: 0016-8386
- JSTOR: 00168386

Links
- Journal homepage

The Georgia Review is a quarterly literary magazine based in Athens, Georgia. Founded in 1947 by John Donald Wade, an English professor at University of Georgia, the journal features poetry, fiction, essays, book reviews, translations and visual art.

The magazine was initially confined to topics relevant to Georgia, but later editors, starting with James Colvert (1968–1972), expanded the magazine's scope beyond the state. The magazine rebranded once again with the Spring 1978 issue, including a new art portfolio, a full-color cover, and an extensive review section.

The journal has won National Magazine Awards for Fiction (1986 and 2022), for Essays (2007), and for Profile Writing (2020). The journal has also received a Governor's Award in the Humanities (2007), and GAMMA awards, given by the Magazine Association of the Southeast (seven each in 2007 and 2008).

Works that appear in The Georgia Review are frequently reprinted in the Best American Short Stories and Best American Poetry and have won the Pushcart and O. Henry Prizes.

== See also ==
- List of literary magazines
