= The Literary Review =

American literary magazine

- Editor: Minna Proctor
- Categories: Literary magazine
- Frequency: Biannually
- Publisher: Fairleigh Dickinson University
- Founded: 1957; 69 years ago
- Country: USA
- Based in: Madison, New Jersey
- Language: English
- Website: theliteraryreview.org
- ISSN: 0024-4589

The Literary Review is an American literary magazine founded in 1957. Publication was suspended in 2022, and the website notes: "Given the extenuating circumstances and the impact of COVID-19 on institutions of higher education, we do not have a timeline for reopening submissions."

The biannual magazine is published internationally by Fairleigh Dickinson University in Madison, New Jersey. In addition to the publication of short stories, poems, and essays, The Literary Review publishes English translations of contemporary fiction from various countries around the world, often dedicating an entire issue to a single language (e.g. Japanese translations).

Since its inception, The Literary Review has published the work of 22 Nobel Prize Laureates. Recent articles and stories published in The Literary Review have been anthologized in The Best American Mystery Stories and elsewhere.

The Literary Review maintains a close relationship with the Fairleigh Dickinson University writing MFA program; several of the program's students can be found on the publication's masthead. It offers the annual Charles Angoff Award for outstanding contributions to the magazine in honor of The Literary Review's editor, poet and novelist Charles Angoff (1902–1979), who served as editor from 1957 to 1976.

The Literary Review under the editorial direction of Walter Cummins was the second literary journal to appear on the Internet, only months behind The Mississippi Review in 1995.
