= The Hudson Review =

- Discipline: Literary journal
- Language: English
- Edited by: Paula Deitz

Publication details
- History: 1948-present
- Publisher: Hudson Review, Inc. (United States)
- Frequency: Quarterly

Standard abbreviations
- ISO 4: Hudson Rev.

Indexing
- ISSN: 0018-702X
- JSTOR: 0018702X

Links
- Journal homepage

The Hudson Review is a quarterly journal of literature and the arts.

== History ==
It was founded in 1947 in New York, by William Arrowsmith, Joseph Deericks Bennett, and George Frederick Morgan. The first issue was introduced in the spring of 1948. Morgan edited the magazine from its founding until 1998, when Paula Deitz succeeded him.

According to the Review's website: "the magazine has dealt with the area where literature bears on the intellectual life of the time and on diverse aspects of American culture. It has no university affiliation and is not committed to any narrow academic aim or to any particular political perspective."

In 2006, Princeton University libraries announced that they had acquired the archives of the journal, which included such important works as an Ezra Pound manuscript.
