= Martha Foley =

American writer

- Born: March 21, 1897; Boston, Massachusetts, U.S.
- Died: September 5, 1977 (aged 80); Northampton, Massachusetts, U.S.

Martha Foley (March 21, 1897 – September 5, 1977) was an American writer. She co-founded Story magazine in 1931 with her husband Whit Burnett, and introduced notable authors through the magazine, such as J. D. Salinger, Tennessee Williams and Richard Wright. In 1941 she became the series editor for The Best American Short Stories series.

== Early life ==
Foley was born in Boston, Massachusetts, on March 21, 1897, to Walter and Margaret M. C. Foley. When she was seven, both her parents fell ill, and were unable to care for her. She dealt with this by writing a novel about a girl who got to go to boarding school.

From 1909 to 1915, she attended Boston Girls' Latin School. The school magazine published her first short story, "Jabberwock", when she was eleven years old. After graduating, she attended Boston University but did not graduate.

Foley became active in both the suffrage and socialist movements. She participated in the women's suffrage demonstration that confronted President Woodrow Wilson when he visited Boston on February 24, 1919.

== Career ==
After leaving Boston University, Foley began a career as journalist and foreign correspondent for a succession of newspapers. These included the Boston Herald, the San Francisco Record, and the New York Daily News. In 1927, she moved to Paris, where she worked for the Paris Herald and wrote fiction.

=== Founding of Story ===
In 1931, she convinced her husband Whit Burnett that they should launch a magazine for short stories, called Story. The first printing, of 167 mimeographed copies comprising the first edition. In 1932, after one year, they and the magazine moved to New York City and were underwritten by Random House.

With the financial backing of Random House, subscriptions were increased to 25,000, a literary service was offered to readers, and new authors were introduced. Story is credited with the first publication and early support of several notable authors, including John Cheever, Carson McCullers, William Saroyan, Truman Capote, Norman Mailer, J. D. Salinger, Tennessee Williams and Richard Wright.

== Family ==
Foley met her husband-to-be, Whit Burnett in 1925, in San Francisco, and in 1927 joined him in Paris. They were married in Vienna in 1930. Their son David was born the following year, in 1931.

Before marriage, Foley was a companion of noted former child prodigy William James Sidis and the object of his unrequited love.
