= The Best American Short Stories 1976 =

1976 book

- Editor: Martha Foley
- Language: English
- Series: The Best American Short Stories
- Publisher: Houghton Mifflin Harcourt
- Media type: Print (hardback & paperback)
- ISBN: 978-0395247709
- Preceded by: The Best American Short Stories 1975
- Followed by: The Best American Short Stories 1977

The Best American Short Stories 1976, a volume in The Best American Short Stories series, was edited by Martha Foley. The volume was published by Houghton Mifflin Harcourt.

== Background ==
The series is considered one of the "best-known annual anthologies of short fiction" and has anthologized more than 2,000 short stories, including works by some of the most famous writers in contemporary American literature, curated by well-known guest editors since 1915. Specifically, Amy Hempel considered it and the O. Henry Award's prize anthology to compile "the best short fiction published in American and Canadian magazines during the preceding year."

In particular, the Willa Cather Review wrote that The Best American Short Stories series "became a repository of values" for creative writing programs and literary magazines, specifically with considerable "influence" in college libraries, short fiction courses, and fiction workshops.

== Short stories included ==
Author	Story	Source
Alice Adams	"Roses, Rhododendron"	The New Yorker
M. Pabst Battin	"Terminal Procedure"	American Review
Mae Seidman Briskin	"The Boy Who Was Astrid's Mother"	Ascent
Nancy Chaikin	"Beautiful, Helpless Animals"	The Colorado Quarterly
John William Corrington	"The Actes and Monuments"	The Sewanee Review
H. E. Francis	"A Chronicle of Love"	Kansas Quarterly
John Hagge	"Pontius Pilate"	The Carleton Miscellany
Ward Just	"Dietz at War"	Virginia Quarterly Review
John McCluskey	"John Henry's Home"	The Iowa Review
Stephen Minot	"Grubbing for Roots"	North American Review
Kent Nelson	"Looking Into Nothing"	Transatlantic Review
Cynthia Ozick	"A Mercenary"	American Review
Reynolds Price	"Broad Day"	Shenandoah
Michael Rothschild	"Wondermonger"	Antaeus
Barry Targan	"Surviving Adverse Seasons"	Salmagundi
Peter Taylor	"The Hand of Emmagene"	Shenandoah
John Updike	"The Man Who Loved Extinct Mammals"	The New Yorker
