= The Best American Short Stories 1977 =

1977 book

- Editor: Martha Foley
- Language: English
- Series: The Best American Short Stories
- Publisher: Houghton Mifflin Harcourt
- Media type: Print (hardback & paperback)
- ISBN: 978-0395257012
- Preceded by: The Best American Short Stories 1976
- Followed by: The Best American Short Stories 1978

The Best American Short Stories 1977, a volume in The Best American Short Stories series, was edited by Martha Foley. The volume was published by Houghton Mifflin Harcourt.

== Background ==
The series is considered one of the "best-known annual anthologies of short fiction" and has anthologized more than 2,000 short stories, including works by some of the most famous writers in contemporary American literature, curated by well-known guest editors since 1915. Specifically, Amy Hempel considered it and the O. Henry Award's prize anthology to compile "the best short fiction published in American and Canadian magazines during the preceding year."

In particular, the Willa Cather Review wrote that The Best American Short Stories series "became a repository of values" for creative writing programs and literary magazines, specifically with considerable "influence" in college libraries, short fiction courses, and fiction workshops.

== Critical reception ==
Kirkus Reviews observed the humorous tilt of Martha Foley's curation: "A lively array, less grimly introspective than usual."

== Short stories included ==
Author	Story	Source
Frederick Busch	"The Trouble With Being Food"	Esquire
Price Caldwell	"Tarzan Meets the Department Head"	The Carleton Miscellany
John Cheever	"Falconer"	Playboy
Ann Copeland	"At Peace"	The Canadian Fiction Magazine
John William Corrington	"Pleadings"	The Southern Review
Philip Damon	"Growing Up In No Time"	Hawaii Review
Leslie Epstein	"The Steinway Quintet"	Antaeus
Eugene K. Garber	"The Lover"	Shenandoah
Patricia Hampl	"Look at a Teacup"	The New Yorker
Baine Kerr	"Rider"	Denver Quarterly
Jack Matthews	"A Questionnaire for Rudolph Gordon"	The Malahat Review
Stephen Minot	"A Passion For History"	The Sewanee Review
Charles Newman	"The Woman Who Thought Like a Man"	Partisan Review
Joyce Carol Oates	"Gay"	Playboy
Tim O'Brien	"Going After Cacciatio"	Ploughshares
Tom Robbins	"The Chink and the Clock People"	American Review
William Saroyan	"A Fresno Fable"	The New Yorker
John Sayles	"Breed"	The Atlantic
Anne Tyler	"Your Place is Empty"	The New Yorker
William S. Wilson	"Anthropology: What is Lost in Rotation"	Antaeus
