= Magazines in Houston =

The Houston area has various local magazines. Around 1991 the Houston area had various small interest magazines established to fill niches not represented in other publications. Many typically had small numbers of employees and had freelance writers write all of their articles. Many relied on advertising revenues, with copies of the magazines being distributed for free. Each year, some magazines start business and some go out of business. Greg Hassell of the Houston Chronicle said "Because of their limited resources, the odds are against them lasting more than a few years. But there always seems to be a few optimists who believe they can break through the barriers."

After the 1980s oil bust various small magazines went out of business. Around 1991 an economic expansion allowed several small magazines to begin business. In addition increases in computer technology helped lower publishing costs, as page design could be done on a computer. In a six-month period before January 1991, five small interest magazines had been established.

== Companies ==
=== Creneau Media Group ===
Creneau Media Group ("Creneau" means niche in French), a company headed by Kevin Clear, produced magazines catering to residents of wealthy neighborhoods such as River Oaks, Memorial, and Tanglewood. The company was headquartered in New Mexico.

Kevin Clear founded the company in 1987. As of January 1991 Creneau published five magazines in Greater Houston. The company had individual neighborhood magazines, with ones for Bellaire, the Memorial Villages, River Oaks, and West University Place. Under Creneau the magazines were published in tabloid layouts of various sizes, and were in black-and-white formats.

In October 1991 the company had 14 employees. During that month the University of Houston Small Business Development Center ranked the company as being No. 50 of the "Houston 100," the fastest-growing companies in the city based on increases in percentages of sales from 1988 to 1990. In 1990 the company had 936,000 sales and a 350% growth. Lisa Collins, Creneau's former associate publisher, said that in 1993 the six community magazines had a combined sales of between $1.5 million and $2 million. After Clear sold the six community magazines to Media Ink on August 1, 1994, he had plans to pursue publishing opportunities in New Mexico.

=== Media Ink ===
The company Media Ink, L.C., headquartered in the Old Sixth Ward area of Houston, was founded by Lisa Collins. She began acting as a managing partner, co-owned the company with advertising director Carol Casperson Moffett and circulation and marketing director Linda Saville. On August 1, 1994, Kevin Clear sold the six community-based magazines owned by Creneau, including five neighborhood magazines and the Downtown Voice, to Media Ink. Collins said that Clear could have sold the magazines to a national conglomerate, but he desired that the magazines remain locally owned. The operations and employees of the six magazines were transferred. 15 full-time employees and several contract employees worked on the magazines. Downtown Voice had a circulation of 14,000 and the five neighborhood magazines had a combined circulation of 38,500. Clear worked as a consultant to Media Ink. On August 23, 1994, Media Ink had 18 employees.

After the handover, one new neighborhood magazine, Boulevards, had been established by Media Ink. Under Media Ink the neighborhood magazines had focuses on citywide calendar listings, historical events, lifestyle columns, local events, and people. In 1996 Media Ink changed the six monthly neighborhood magazines into a new format. The company began using large, high-quality photos frequently and adopting a magazine-style format described by Walker C. Wooding, Jr. of the Houston Business Journal as "more sophisticated". 1999 Wooding said "Media Ink has transformed the design with a more sophisticated, magazine-style format and the extensive use of large, high-quality photos." He added that "In conceptualizing and styling the covers, Media Ink took the approach of treating black and white photography as high art rather than a limitation in printing" and that it slowly became "the publication's feature photography." Collins said "We feel that black and white photography should be treated as art, not as a limitation of printing." Media Ink had considered establishing other neighborhood titles, but it chose not to. Media Ink chose to distribute its magazines on newsstands to increase circulations. In its neighborhood magazines Media Ink established a new contents page "Grapevine" section that was distinct from its other regular-running columns. The company began cross-posting stories to various neighborhood publications, so that a story occurring in one neighborhood that would be of interest to another appeared in the other neighborhood's magazine.

In July 1998 Collins, now named Lisa Perry, decided to reorganize the regional neighborhood magazines. The magazines, previously under six separate mastheads, were now under a single masthead, Houston City Life. The six regional magazines continued to remain separate editions. In 1999 Lisa Perry was now known as Lisa Johnson. During the annual banquet of The Association for Women Journalists on the evening of Thursday May 13, 1999, Dawn Dorsey, a Houston City Life Bellaire journalist, was nominated a finalist for the 1999 Vivian Castleberry Awards.

== Magazines ==
- ArtHouston Magazine
  - John Bernhard, publisher and editor-in-chief, launched ArtHouston Magazine in September 2015. A semi-annual publication, ArtHouston is distributed freely throughout the city at select art institutions, art galleries, bookstores and other outlets.
  - ArtHouston covers all arts disciplines, from performing and visual art, to music and film. It is the ultimate resource for connoisseurs, collectors, and art aficionados. Editorially, the magazine aims to be a springboard for artists, curators, writers and patrons.
  - Past issues can be viewed online at www.arthoustonmagazine.com.
- Bellaire Magazine
  - The magazine, aimed towards residents of Bellaire, began publication in January 1991. It was published by Creneau Media Group. The first issue was published in February 1991. Bellaire had an ordinance that prohibited doorstep delivery of non-newspaper publications that did not meet a set of criteria; the publisher, Kevin Clear, said that he was aware of the ordinance but believed it was only aimed at fliers rather than formal publications. For the first two months Bellaire was delivered to all doorsteps. In late March 1991 Bellaire City Council told the company that it would enforce its law, so the magazine began delivery through the U.S. Postal Service. Due to the increased costs, Bellaire was only mail delivered to the wealthier areas of Bellaire. Due to demands from advertisers wanting a larger market, Creneau later began distributing Bellaire to Braeswood Place and Meyerland in Houston. On August 1, 1994, it was sold to Media Ink.
- Boulevards
  - Boulevards was a magazine established by Media Ink.
- Cite
- Country Spirit
  - Country Spirit was a country music magazine oriented towards Texas, published by Carl Faulkner. It debuted in September 1990. It produced 25,000 copies per month. In 1991 the magazine had five full-time employees. The magazine relied on freelance writers for its articles. All of its revenues stemmed from advertising, and all copies of the magazine were distributed for free.
- Culinary Thymes
  - It is a bi-monthly cooking and home entertainment magazine published by Alyce Eyster and Jennifer Frazier.
- DBA Magazine
  - The magazine had business-related articles and features. The magazine began in December 1990.
- Downtown, Inc./Downtown Voice
  - Clear planned to establish a magazine about Downtown Houston that would be published by Creneau. In January 1990 his company had developed a business plan aimed towards competing with Houston Downtown magazine. Houston Downtown was closed before Clear could develop a new magazine. Clear planned to introduce his magazine in May 1991. As of January 1991 he had not decided on a name for the magazine. Clear said "I hate to say we danced on their grave, but we weren't unhappy about the way things turned out." Elise Perachio became the editor of the magazine, which was ultimately named Downtown, Inc. On August 1, 1994, the magazine, then called Downtown Voice, was sold to Media Ink.
- Houstonia
- Houston City Magazine
- Houston Downtown
  - The magazine, oriented towards Downtown Houston, was published by Rosie Walker, a Woodland Heights resident who was 49 years old in 1989. Walker served as the magazine's co-owner. Most area residents called it the "Downtowner." Walker was originally an office worker in Downtown Houston who was upset that she had learned of events occurring in Downtown Houston after they had already occurred. Walker said "Several people in our office decided to start a newsletter. It sort of expanded throughout our company and throughout our building." It had been published for 14 years. Walker said, as paraphrased by Greg Hassell of the Houston Chronicle, that the first eleven years of the magazine were "fun and rewarding" but that deadlines, economic pressures that the magazine could not control, and budgets "strangled" the "fun." Walker said "The magazine was not financially rewarding for us, and there are only so many times you want to eat Thanksgiving dinner and Christmas dinner in the print shop."
  - In 1991 the business had paid off its debts. Walker decided not to take out loans to update her equipment and printing processes and instead closed the magazine during that year. Walker said "We have a family-owned business, so we can't resign - we have to just stop. Since we didn't owe anybody anything, and we're tired, it's just a good time." The final issue appeared in January 1991. Walker wrote the cover story; Tara Parker Pope of the Houston Chronicle said that Walker "opined that Houston needs an urban agenda to achieve racial harmony, control its community development money and protect the city's neighborhoods." In regards to the issue, Walker said, as paraphrased by Pope, "those who know her saw there was something different about the January issue."
  - Walker had run for Mayor of Houston in 1989 as a minor candidate, and her platform was entirely focused on a single issue: to enact zoning. Alan Bernstein of the Houston Chronicle said that Walker "got very few votes, partly because her name was never mentioned in the same breath as other contenders, [Kathryn J. "Kathy"] Whitmire and Fred Hofheinz." Bernstein explained that, in that election, "most of the attention was focused on Hofheinz's attempt to unseat Whitmire." Nene Foxhall of the Houston Chronicle said that of all of the minor candidates, Walker had received the most media attention.
- Houston Life
  - Houston Life was an independently published magazine that had features about Houston. Mark Inabnit began the magazine in 1974 using a $150,000 investment. Originally the magazine was named Houston Home and Garden. Circa 1983 Inabnit sold the magazine for $7 million. The magazine's new owners changed the magazine's focus so it centered around Houston, and the magazine received the new name Houston Metropolitan. Shortly after the sale, the oil bust occurred. Inabnit had returned to Houston by 1992. Another entity was in control of the magazine. Each year the magazine was operated at a loss, in the millions of dollars. Inabnit paid $90 to buy the magazine back and intended to rebuild it as a lifestyle magazine. Inabnit said "City magazines in my opinion are no longer a viable concept. People are now concerned about personal well-being, pets, family. My idea was to build an editorial product about how to live better in your particular city."
  - Prior to restarting production, Inabnit decided to ask the Houston Post to place copies of the magazine in its Sunday edition, delivering copies of the newspaper with the magazine inside. Inabnit was to print all copies of the magazine, solicit all of the advertising, and provide all of the editorial content. Inabnit decided to do this because he estimated that, in order to gain a circulation of 200,000 to 300,000 without having the magazine inserted in an existing publication, it would take three to five years and $8 million. The publisher and chief executive of The Houston Post, Ike Massey, approved of the idea, calling it "an added-value benefit". The Houston Post and Inabnit did not disclose the financial details of the deal. In February 1994 the Houston Post began distributing the magazine on the third Sunday of each month.
- Houston Sport
  - The magazine, which discussed Houston-area sporting events and sporting personalities, debuted in October 1990. It was published on a quarterly basis.
- Platinum
  - Platinum was a rap magazine scheduled to launch in September 1999. The creator, Carolyn Chambers Sanders, had also published and founded Link magazine. Joyetta D. Johnson was scheduled to be the CEO and vice president of the magazine; she was the lifestyle editor of Link.
- Red Dot
  - Red Dot is a monthly magazine focusing on performing and visual arts. As of 2004 the magazine had a distribution of 10,000. Art galleries, bookstores, museums, and performance centers stocked the magazine. As of that year, Julee Clear of Creneau Media Group publishes the magazine.
- River Oaks Magazine
  - The magazine, aimed towards residents of River Oaks, began publication in January 1990. It was published by Creneau Media Group. On August 1, 1994, it was sold to Media Ink.
- Sugar and Rice
  - The magazine is a cooking magazine that was scheduled to debut in the northern hemisphere fall of 2013. David Leftwich is the executive editor. The magazine is named after the principal ahricultural exports of the Houston area. The staff of the Down House, a restaurant in the Houston Heights, were to be a part of the magazine.
- Tanglewood Magazine
  - The magazine, aimed towards residents of Tanglewood, began publication in January 1991. It was published by Creneau Media Group. The first issue was published in February 1991. On August 1, 1994, it was sold to Media Ink.
- Villages Magazine/Memorial-Villages Magazine
  - The magazine, aimed towards residents of Bunker Hill Village, Hedwig Village, Hunter's Creek Village, and Piney Point Village, began publication in April 1990. The magazine, called Villages, was published by Creneau Media Group. The magazine, later called Memorial-Villages Magazine, was sold to Media Ink on August 1, 1994.
- West U. Magazine
  - The magazine, aimed towards residents of West University Place, was published by Creneau. It began publication in the late northern hemisphere summer of 1987. Kevin Clear, the head of Creneau, began publishing the magazine from his kitchen table. The magazine was sold to Media Ink on August 1, 1994.
