= Village Arcade =

Shopping center in Rice Village, Houston, Texas

Coordinates: 29.71608°N 95.41621°W

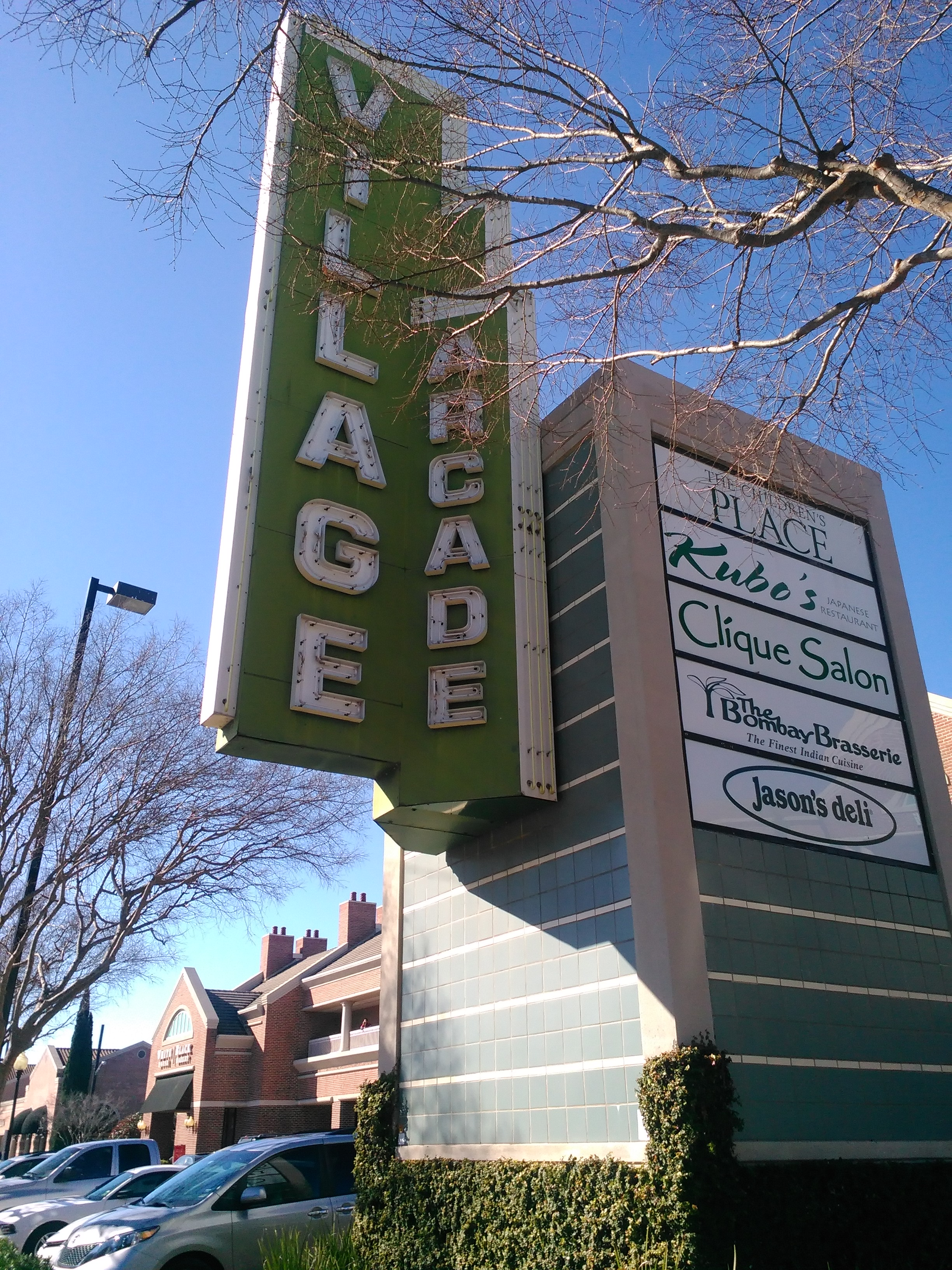
Village Arcade sign

The Village Arcade Shopping Center is a shopping center in Rice Village, Houston, Texas owned by Rice University.

== History ==
The center was developed in phases in the early 1990s. The buildings of the Village Arcade complex were owned by Weingarten Realty while a subsidiary of Rice University owned the land itself. Weingarten had a ground lease with options to renew the center until 2040.

David Kaplan of Cite wrote in 1996 that the development "has become a lightning rod of controversy, representing either the glories or the perils of progress." Kaplan stated that the Rice Village development paralleled the teardowns of smaller older houses and replacements with larger houses in surrounding neighborhoods.

In 2014 Rice University announced that it was acquiring the Village Arcade shopping center from Weingarten Realty. Rice University opted to buy Weingarten out of its lease, paying $55–60 million. This means the university also owns the property in addition to the land.

== Composition ==
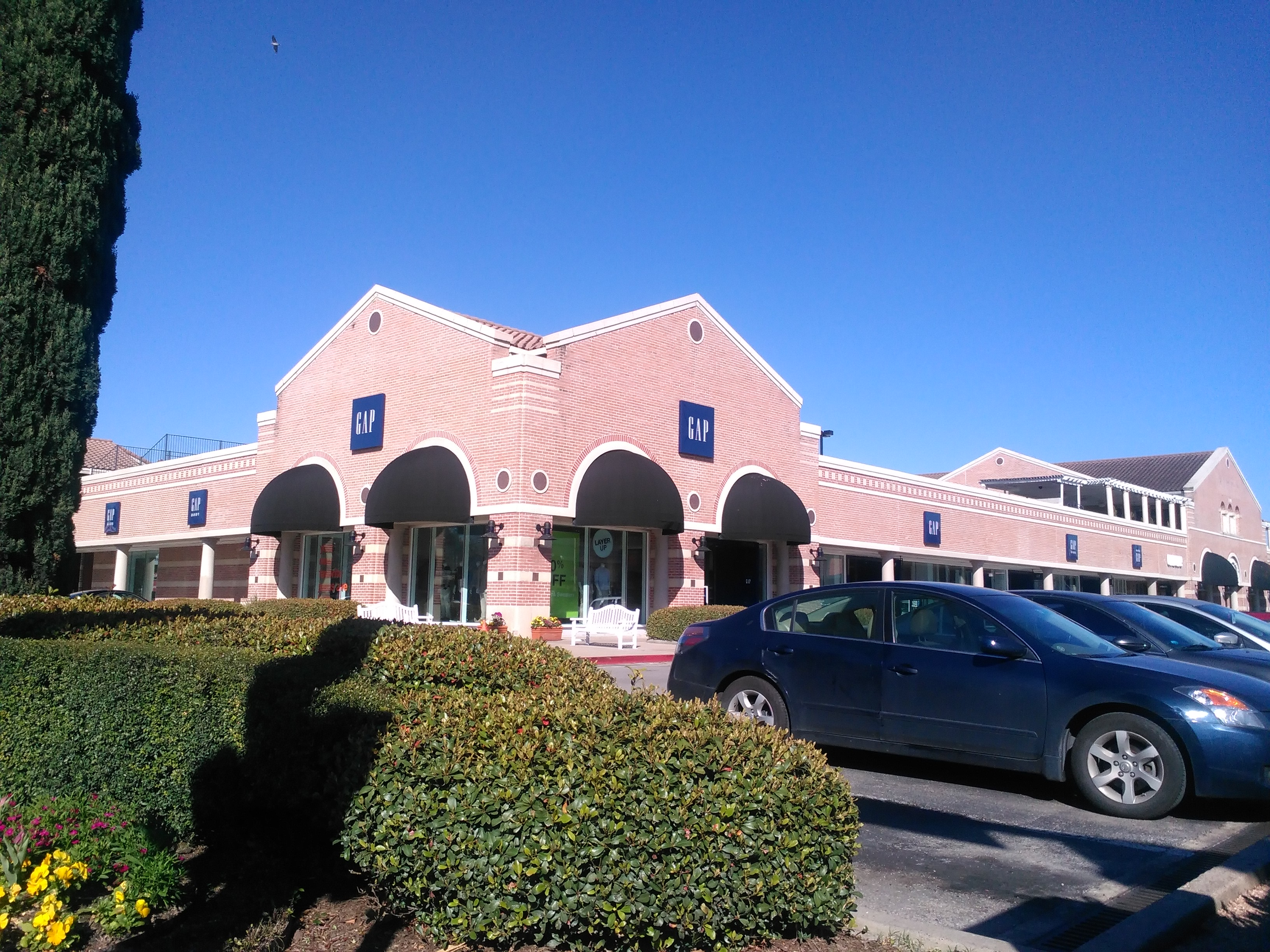
Village Arcade

The Village Arcade is a pink brick shopping center. The Village Arcade occupies an area bounded by Kirby Drive, Amherst, Morningside, and University. The development also occupies most of the block bounded by Kelvin, Amherst, Times, and Morningside. Kaplan wrote that compared to other developments in Rice Village, it is a "monolith".

== Tenants ==
As of 2013 it includes tenants such as Banana Republic, The Gap, La Madeleine, and Starbucks.

As of 2001 The Gatsby Social Club, previously the Cody's in the Village, is located on the complex's top floor.

As of 1996 it includes national chains such as Eddie Bauer, Express, Gap, Starbucks, Structure, and Victoria's Secret.

== Bibliography ==
- Kaplan, David (Winter 1996). "The Village" (PDF). Cite. Rice Design Alliance: 16–21. Archived from the original (PDF) on April 15, 2014.
