= The Best American Short Stories 1974 =

1974 short story anthology

- Editor: Martha Foley
- Language: English
- Series: The Best American Short Stories
- Publisher: Houghton Mifflin Harcourt
- Media type: Print
- ISBN: 9780395194157
- Preceded by: The Best American Short Stories 1973
- Followed by: The Best American Short Stories 1975

The Best American Short Stories 1974 is a volume in The Best American Short Stories series edited by Martha Foley. The volume was published by Houghton Mifflin Harcourt.

== Background ==
The series is considered one of the "best-known annual anthologies of short fiction" and has anthologized more than 2,000 short stories, including works by some of the most famous writers in contemporary American literature.

In particular, the Willa Cather Review wrote that The Best American Short Stories series "became a repository of values" for creative writing programs, college libraries, and literary magazines. The Los Angeles Times, reflecting on the hundred-year anniversary of the series, noted that it eventually became an "institution" itself, often being taught in classrooms.

== Short stories included ==
Author	Story	Source	
1974	Agnes Boyer	"The Deserter"	PRISM international
1974	Jerry Bumpus	"Beginnings"	TriQuarterly
1974	Eleanor Clark	"A Summer in Puerto Rico"	The Southern Review
1974	Pat M. Esslinger-Carr	"The Party"	The Southern Review
1974	Lewis B. Horne	"Mansion, Magic, and Miracle"	The Colorado Quarterly
1974	Rose Graubart Ignatow	"Down the American River"	Shenandoah
1974	Maxine Kumin	"Opening the Door on Sixty-Second Street"	The Southern Review
1974	Mary Lavin	"Tom"	The New Yorker
1974	John L'Heureux	"A Family Affair"	Atlantic Monthly
1974	Phillip Lopate	"The Chamber Music Evening"	Paris Review
1974	Stephen Minot	"The Tide and Isaac Bates"	Quarterly Review of Literature
1974	Beverly Mitchell	"Letter from Sakaye"	The Fiddlehead
1974	Michael Rothschild	"Dog in the Manger"	Antaeus
1974	Peter L. Sandberg	"Calloway's Climb"	Playboy
1974	William Saroyan	"Isn't Today the Day?"	Harper's Magazine
1974	Phillip H. Schneider	"The Gray"	Kansas Quarterly
1974	Barry Targan	"Old Vemish"	Salmagundi
1974	John Updike	"Son"	The New Yorker
1974	Arturo Vivante	"Honeymoon"	The New Yorker
1974	Alice Walker	"The Revenge of Hannah Kemhuff"	Ms.
