= The Best American Short Stories 1970 =

1970 short story anthology

- Editor: Martha Foley
- Language: English
- Series: The Best American Short Stories
- Publisher: Houghton Mifflin Harcourt
- Media type: Print
- ISBN: 978-0395109403
- Preceded by: The Best American Short Stories 1969
- Followed by: The Best American Short Stories 1971

The Best American Short Stories 1970 is a volume in The Best American Short Stories series edited by Martha Foley. The volume was published by Houghton Mifflin Harcourt.

== Background ==
The series is considered one of the "best-known annual anthologies of short fiction" and has anthologized more than 2,000 short stories, including works by some of the most famous writers in contemporary American literature.

In particular, the Willa Cather Review wrote that The Best American Short Stories series "became a repository of values" for creative writing programs, college libraries, and literary magazines. The Los Angeles Times, reflecting on the hundred-year anniversary of the series, noted that it eventually became an "institution" itself, often being taught in classrooms.

== Short stories included ==
Author	Story	Source
Jack Cady	"With No Breeze"	The Carolina Quarterly
Eldridge Cleaver	"The Flashlight"	Playboy
Robert Coover	"The Magic Poker"	Esquire
Olivia Davis	"The Other Child"	Prairie Schooner
Andre Dubus	"If They Knew Yvonne"	North American Review
John Bart Gerald	"Blood Letting"	The Atlantic
Alfred Gillespie	"Tonight at Nine Thirty-six"	Redbook
Ella Leffland	"The Forest"	Epoch
Jack Matthews	"Another Story"	The Sewanee Review
William Maxwell	"The Gardens of Mont-Saint-Michel"	The New Yorker
Wright Morris	"Green Grass, Blue Sky, White House"	The New Yorker
Joyce Carol Oates	"How I contemplated the world from the Detroit House of Correction and began my life all over again"	TriQuarterly
Paul Olsen	"The Flag Is Down"	The Southern Review
Cynthia Ozick	"Yiddish in America"	Commentary
Jules Siegel	"In the Land of the Morning Calm, Deja Vu"	Esquire
Isaac Bashevis Singer	"The Key"	The New Yorker
Robert Stone	"Porque No Tiene, Porque Le Falta"	New American Review
Peter Taylor	"Daphne's Lover"	The Sewanee Review
Rosine Weisbrod	"The Ninth Cold Day"	Virginia Quarterly Review
