= The Best American Short Stories 1973 =

1973 short story anthology

- Editor: Martha Foley
- Language: English
- Series: The Best American Short Stories
- Publisher: Houghton Mifflin Harcourt
- Media type: Print
- ISBN: 9780395171196
- Preceded by: The Best American Short Stories 1972
- Followed by: The Best American Short Stories 1974

The Best American Short Stories 1973 is a volume in The Best American Short Stories series edited by Martha Foley. The volume was published by Houghton Mifflin Harcourt.

== Background ==
The series is considered one of the "best-known annual anthologies of short fiction" and has anthologized more than 2,000 short stories, including works by some of the most famous writers in contemporary American literature.

In particular, the Willa Cather Review wrote that The Best American Short Stories series "became a repository of values" for creative writing programs, college libraries, and literary magazines. The Los Angeles Times, reflecting on the hundred-year anniversary of the series, noted that it eventually became an "institution" itself, often being taught in classrooms.

== Short stories included ==
Author	Story	Source
Donald Barthelme	"A City of Churches"	The New Yorker
Henry Bromell	"The Slightest Distance"	The New Yorker
John Cheever	"The Jewels of the Cabots"	Playboy
John J. Clayton	"Cambridge is Sinking!"	The Massachusetts Review
John William Corrington	"Old Men Dream Dreams, Young Men See Visions"	The Sewanee Review
Guy Davenport	"Robot"	The Hudson Review
William Eastlake	"The Death of Sun"	Cosmopolitan
Alvin Greenberg	"The Real Meaning of the Faust Legend"	The New American Review
Julie Hayden	"In the Words of"	The New Yorker
George V. Higgins	"The Habits of Animals: The Progress of the Seasons"	North American Review
Ward Just	"Burns"	The Atlantic Monthly
James S. Kenary	"Going Home"	The Massachusetts Review
Wallace E. Knight	"The Way We Went"	The Atlantic Monthly
Konstantinos Lardas	"The Broken Wings"	The South Dakota Review
James Alan McPherson	"The Silver Bullet"	Playboy
Bernard Malamud	"God's Wrath"	The Atlantic Monthly
Joyce Carol Oates	"Silkie"	The Malahat Review
Sylvia Plath	"Mothers"	McCall's
Erik Sandberg-Diment	"Come Away, Oh Human Child"	Kansas Quarterly
David Shetzline	"Country of the Painted Freaks"	The Paris Review
Tennessee Williams	"Happy August the 10th"	Esquire
