= Phillip Lopate =

American novelist

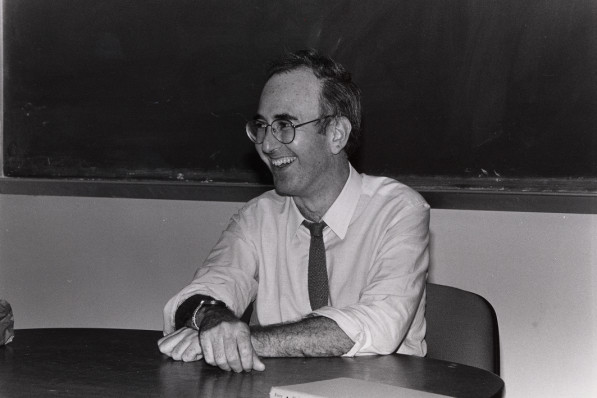
- Born: November 16, 1943 (age 82); Brooklyn, New York, US
- Education: Columbia University (BA); Union Institute & University (PhD)
- Occupations: Essayist; film critic; teacher; fiction writer; poet
- Spouse: Carol Bergman (1964–1970): Cheryl Cipriani (1991–present)
- Children: 1
- Relatives: Leonard Lopate (brother)
- Writing career
- Genre: Fiction, essays, poetry, literary criticism
- Notable works: Getting Personal (2003); Waterfront: A Walk Around Manhattan (2005); The Glorious American Essay (2020)

Phillip Lopate (born November 16, 1943) is an American essayist, film critic, fiction writer, and poet.

== Early life ==
He was born in Brooklyn to Jewish parents, Fran Beslow and Albert Lopate; his father was an aspiring writer whose mother tongue was Yiddish. His parents ran a candy store together and had a tumultuous marriage, and he was raised in relative poverty in tenements in Williamsburg. As a teenager, he joined the local Orthodox Jewish choir and considered becoming a cantor.

He graduated with a BA degree from Columbia University in 1964, where he edited The Columbia Review. He received his doctorate from Union Institute & University in 1979. Lopate is the younger brother of radio host Leonard Lopate.

== Career ==
=== Teaching ===
Lopate worked as a writer-in-the-schools for twelve years and his memoir Being With Children came out of his association with the artists-in-the-school organization Teachers & Writers Collaborative (T&W). Lopate coordinated T&W's first project (at Manhattan's P.S. 75), the model for which led to similar programs in all 50 states.

He has taught creative writing and literature to undergraduate and graduate students at several institutions, including Bennington College, Fordham University, Cooper Union, the University of Houston, and New York University. He held the Adams Chair at Hofstra University until 2011, where he was also professor of English. He was a professor of writing at Columbia University until he retired in 2023.

=== Writing ===
Lopate's essays, fiction, and poetry have appeared in several Pushcart Prize annuals, as well as The Paris Review, Harper's Magazine, Ploughshares, The Threepenny Review, Harvard Educational Review, Boulevard, DoubleTake, and Creative Nonfiction, among others.

Lopate has written for the New York Times Sophisticated Traveler, Conde Nast Traveler, European Travel and Life, Sidestreets of the World, and American Way.

Lopate has written about architecture and urbanism for Metropolis, The New York Times, DoubleTake, Preservation, and Cite. He wrote a bimonthly architectural column for Seven Days. He has served as a committee member for the Municipal Art Society and as a consultant for Ric Burns' PBS documentary New York: A Documentary Film.

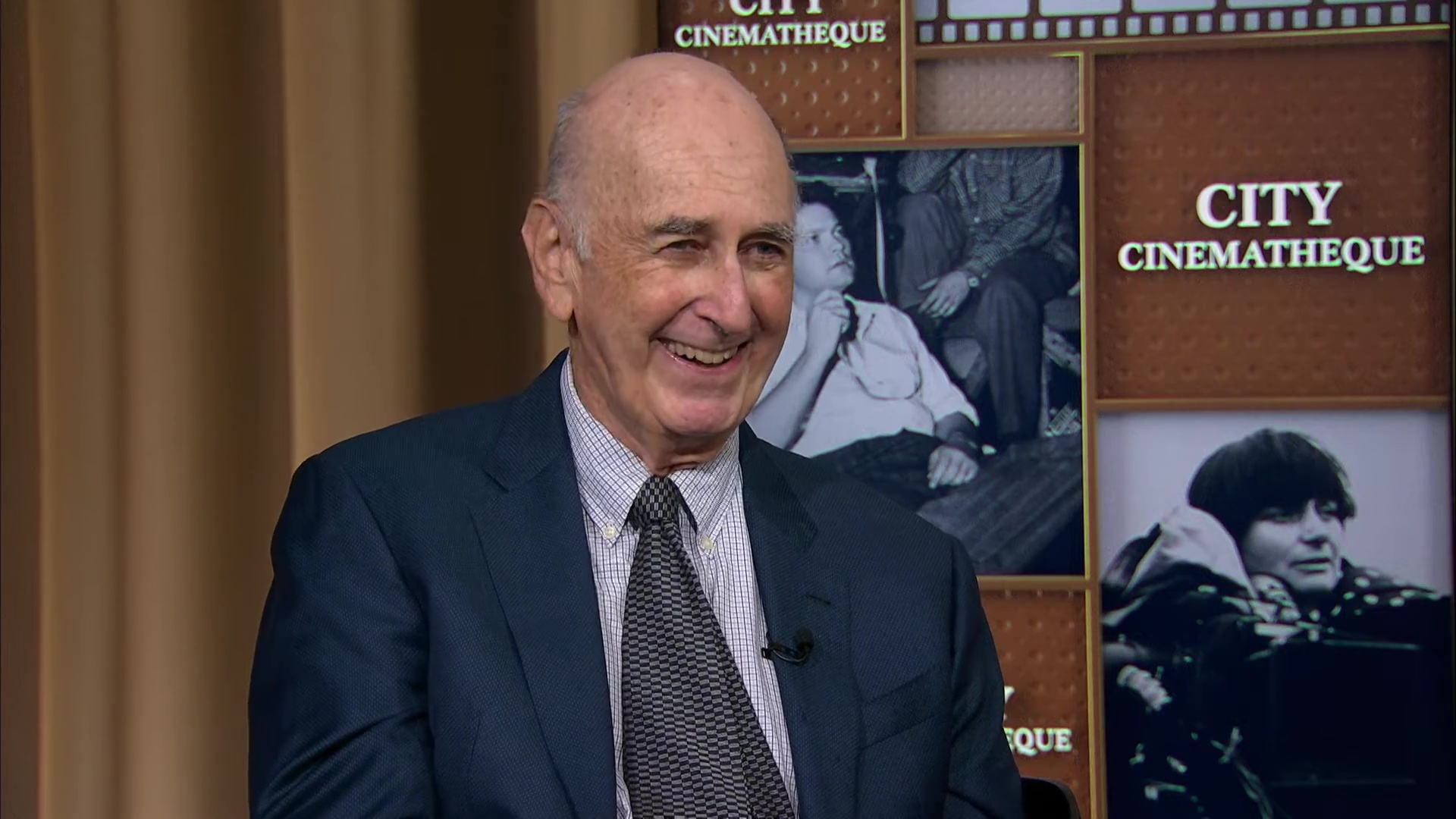
Lopate on CUNY TV's City Cinematheque, 2023

He has written about movies for The New York Times, Vogue, Esquire, Film Comment, Film Quarterly, Cinemabook, Threepenny Review, Tikkun, American Film, The Normal School, and the anthology The Movie That Changed My Life, among others. A volume of his selected movie criticism, Totally Tenderly Tragically, was published by Doubleday Anchor in 1998. He edited an anthology of American film criticism from the silent era to present day, entitled American Movie Critics: From Silents Until Now, which was published in March 2006 by Library of America.

== Personal life ==
He has been married twice. In 1964, he married Carol Bergman; they divorced in 1970.

In 1991, he married his second wife Cheryl Cipriani, with whom he has a daughter. The couple raised their daughter in the Conservative Jewish Congregation Baith Israel Anshei Emes.

== Awards and fellowships ==
Lopate has been awarded a Guggenheim Fellowship, a New York Public Library Center for Scholars and Writers Fellowship, two National Endowment for the Arts grants, and two New York Foundation for the Arts grants. He also received a Christopher Medal (for Being With Children), received the Texas Institute of Letters Award for Best Book of Nonfiction (for Bachelorhood), and was a finalist for the PEN/Diamonstein-Spielvogel Award for the Art of the Essay (for Portrait of My Body). His anthology Writing New York received an honorable mention from the Municipal Art Society's Brendan Gill Prize and a citation from the New York Society Library. He was also a Lila Wallace Foundation writer-in-residence. He is a fellow of the American Academy of Arts and Sciences.

== Publications ==
=== Nonfiction ===
- Being With Children (Doubleday, 1975)
- Bachelorhood (Little, Brown and Company, 1981)
- Against Joie de Vivre (Simon & Schuster, 1989)
- Portrait of My Body (Doubleday Anchor, 1996)
- Totally Tenderly Tragically (Anchor Books, 1998)
- Getting Personal: Selected Essays (Basic Books, 2003)
- Waterfront: A Walk Around Manhattan (Anchor Books, 2004)
- Notes on Sontag (Princeton University Press, 2009)
- Portrait Inside My Head (Free Press, 2013)
- To Show and to Tell (Free Press, 2013)
- A Mother's Tale (Mad River Books, 2017)
- A Year and a Day (New York Review Books, 2023)
- My Affair with Art House Cinema: Essays and Reviews (Columbia University Press, 2024)
- A Washington Irving Sketch Book: Reflections on an American Writer (Princeton University Press, 2026)

=== Fiction ===
- Confessions of Summer (Doubleday, 1979)
- The Rug Merchant (Viking Press, 1987)
- Two Marriages (Other Press, 2008)

=== Poetry ===
- The Eyes Don't Always Want to Stay Open (Sun Press, 1972)
- The Daily Round (Sun Press, 1976)
- At the End of the Day (Marsh Hawk Press, 2010)

=== Anthologies ===
==== As contributor ====
- "The Chamber Music Evening" in The Best American Short Stories 1974, ed. Martha Foley (Houghton Mifflin, 1974)
- "Against Joie de Vivre" in The Best American Essays, ed. Gay Talese (Ticknor and Fields, 1987)

==== As editor ====
- Journal of a Living Experiment (Teachers & Writers Press, 1979)
- The Art of the Personal Essay (Doubleday Anchor, 1994)
- Writing New York (Library of America, 1998)
- The Anchor Essay Annual: The Best of 1997 (Anchor Books, 1997)
- The Anchor Essay Annual: The Best of 1998 (Anchor Books, 1998)
- The Art of the Essay: 1999 (Anchor Books, 1999)
- American Movie Critics (Library of America, 2006)
- The Prince of Minor Writers: The Selected Essays of Max Beerbohm (New York Review Books, 2015)
- The Glorious American Essay: One Hundred Essays from Colonial Times to the Present (Pantheon Books, 2020)
- The Golden Age of the American Essay (Anchor Books, 2021)
- The Contemporary American Essay (Anchor Books, 2021)
