= The Best American Short Stories 1972 =

1972 short story anthology

- Editor: Martha Foley
- Language: English
- Series: The Best American Short Stories
- Publisher: Houghton Mifflin Harcourt
- Media type: Print
- ISBN: 978-0395139509
- Preceded by: The Best American Short Stories 1971
- Followed by: The Best American Short Stories 1973

The Best American Short Stories 1972 is a volume in The Best American Short Stories series edited by Martha Foley. The volume was published by Houghton Mifflin Harcourt.

== Background ==
The series is considered one of the "best-known annual anthologies of short fiction" and has anthologized more than 2,000 short stories, including works by some of the most famous writers in contemporary American literature.

In particular, the Willa Cather Review wrote that The Best American Short Stories series "became a repository of values" for creative writing programs, college libraries, and literary magazines. The Los Angeles Times, reflecting on the hundred-year anniversary of the series, noted that it eventually became an "institution" itself, often being taught in classrooms.

== Short stories included ==
Author	Story	Source	
1972	M. F. Beal	"Gold"	New American Review
1972	Richard Brautigan	"The World War I Los Angeles Airplane"	New American Review
1972	Kelly Cherry	"Covenant"	Commentary
1972	Herbert Gold	"A Death on the East Side"	Esquire
1972	Joanne Greenberg	"The Supremacy of the Hunza "	The Transatlantic Review
1972	Mary Heath	"The Breadman"	The Virginia Quarterly Review
1972	Edward M. Holmes	"Drums Again"	Virginia Quarterly Review
1972	Mary Gray Hughes	"The Judge"	The Atlantic Monthly
1972	Ann Jones	"In Black and White"	Virginia Quarterly Review
1972	Ward Just	"Three Washington Stories"	The Atlantic Monthly
1972	Roberta Kalechofsky	"His Day Out"	The Western Humanities Review
1972	Rebecca Kavaler	"The Further Adventures of Brunhild"	The Yale Review
1972	John L'Heureux	"Fox and Swan"	The Transatlantic Review
1972	Ralph Maloney	"Intimacy"	The Atlantic Monthly
1972	Marvin Mandell	"The Aesculapians"	Epoch
1972	Cynthia Ozick	"The Dock-Witch"	Event
1972	Joe Ashby Porter	"The Vacation"	Occident
1972	Penelope Street	"The Magic Apple"	Occident
1972	Robert Penn Warren	"Meet Me in the Green Glen"	Partisan Review
1972	Theodore Weesner	"Stealing Cars"	Audience
1972	Jose Yglesias	"The Guns in the Closet"	The New Yorker
