= Rice Village =

Shopping Center

Coordinates: 29.716°N 95.416°W

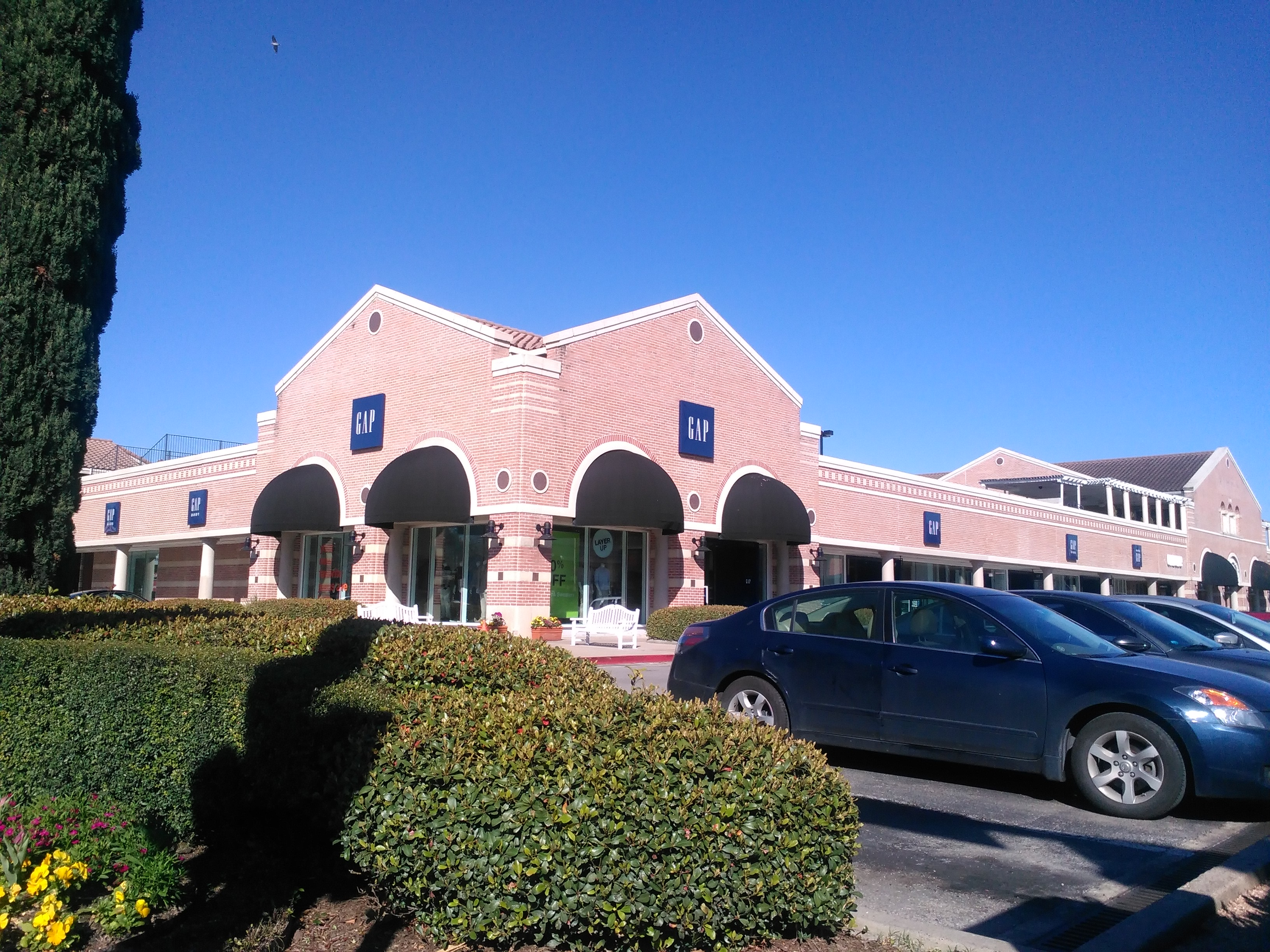
Village Arcade shopping center

Rice Village is a shopping district in Houston, Texas, United States.

Rice Village is a collection of shops, restaurants and pubs, situated about a half-mile west of the center of Rice University's 300-acre (1.2 km^{2}) campus. The core "Rice Village" extends over several city blocks, bounded by University Boulevard, Kirby Drive, Tangley Street, Morningside Drive, Rice Boulevard, and Greenbriar Drive, though spillover has expanded the retail area to encompass businesses as far north as Bissonnet Street.

== History ==
Rice Village began operations in 1938. It is an unplanned, high density hodge-podge of old and new retail stores.

David Kaplan of Cite wrote that during the 1950s and 1960s Rice Village "filled up and prospered" but the economic boom in Greater Houston in the 1970s caused development to come elsewhere. He credited the influx of young families in Southgate and Southampton in Houston and the City of West University Place, beginning in the 1980s, to revitalizing Rice Village.

In the mid-1980s Rice University began buying land in the Rice Village area. Scott Wise, the university's vice president for investments, stated in 1996 that Rice Village is "strategically located" and allows possible growth and flexibility.

The first minutes of the 1994 film The Chase were filmed in the Rice Village.

== Cityscape ==
The Village Arcade occupies an area bounded by Kirby Drive, Amherst, Morningside, and University. The development also occupies most of the block bounded by Kelvin, Amherst, Times, and Morningside.

== Business and shopping ==
From its origins in the 1930s an ad hoc cluster of retail stores, the Rice Village has grown to become one of Houston's shopping destinations. Host to over 300 shops in a 16-block area, Rice Village is known for its many small and eclectic shops and boutiques. Recent expansion in the area has also brought in high-end clothing stores and the nationwide retail venues. As Village retail became denser in the 1990s, limited parking finally led to the closure of Rice Food Market, the last surviving Rice Village grocery store. Residential real estate has recently re-entered the area with the opening of the Hanover Rice Village Luxury Apartments.

== Government ==
Rice Village is a part of the West University Place Super Neighborhood Council.

Rice Village is in Texas's 7th congressional district.

== Police service ==
The neighborhood is within the Houston Police Department's South Central Patrol Division.

== Education ==
The complex is zoned to the following Houston ISD schools:

- Poe Elementary School
- Lanier Middle School
- Lamar High School

== Media ==
In the mid-20th century the community newspaper Southwestern Times was headquartered in Rice Village.
