= Ephemeral City =

Non-fiction book by Barrie Scardino, William Stern, and Bruce Webb

- Editor: Barrie Scardino, William F. Stern and Bruce C. Webb
- Genre: Nonfiction
- Publisher: University of Texas Press
- Publication date: 2003

Ephemeral City: Cite Looks at Houston is a 2003 nonfiction book edited by Barrie Scardino, William F. Stern and Bruce C. Webb and published by the University of Texas Press. It includes twenty-five essays published in Cite from 1982 until 2000, as well as postscripts from 2002. Mike Snyder of the Houston Chronicle stated "The title reflects the elusive nature of Houston's most essential qualities." Peter Kaufman of the Boston Architectural Center, now Boston Architectural College, wrote that the book serves "as a mosaic portrait of Houston over the 20th century" instead of being a collection of the most distinguished articles from the publication, and the editors stated this in their notes.

== Background ==
Scardino, Stern, and Webb were the publication's founding editors.

== Contents ==
The essays discuss the urban core and suburban areas of Houston; Snyder stated that the book "thoughtful balance" between the two. Ph.D. candidate James Wright stated that most of the articles oppose "Houston's disinterest in architectural equilibrium and unchecked impulse towards pastiche". The essays include updates, current as of the time of publication, in the postscripts by the authors. This was done in lieu of revising the essays themselves.

Peter G. Rowe, the dean of Harvard University's College of Architecture, wrote the foreword. The book itself has three parts: I: Idea of the City, II: Places of the City, and III: Buildings of the City. These discuss city-wide, infrastructure and zoning issues; specific districts and neighborhoods; and specific buildings, landmarks, and notable persons in architecture, respectively. Scardino wrote the introduction to "Places of the City". Christopher Dow wrote in Sallyport, the Rice University magazine, that the majority of the essays had a "descriptive" character.

Landscape photographer Paul Hester created most of the photographs. The images also include maps and planning documents. The photographs are in black and white. Dow stated that the book uses many photographs.

=== Essays ===
In "Utopia Limited: Houston's Ring Around the Beltway", from 1994, Richard Ingersoll discusses his belief that master-planned communities like Clear Lake City, First Colony, Kingwood, and The Woodlands were not as well-planned as their reputations had stated; Ingersoll was a professor in the Rice University School of Architecture.

Joel Warren Barna discussed development in Houston's innermost core, within the 610 Loop, in "In Filling the Doughnut," from 1998.

Phillip Lopate, a poet, wrote the article "Pursuing the Unicorn", describing how there is few public areas in the city.

== Reception ==
Judith K. De Jong of the University of Illinois at Chicago concluded that the book "is an outstanding collection of essays, intelligently chosen and organized, well written and accessible, and compelling in its search for meaning in the "ephemeral" American city that Houston epitomizes so well." She believed that the first section of the book was the best, arguing that its contents "establish a cohesive, comprehensible historical and cultural framework with which to understand the ever- changing physical character of this fascinating, yet often inscrutable, city."

Igor Vojnovic of Michigan State University stated that the book accomplished the goals the authors set out to do, that "there is much I like" about the book, and that the organization was superb. Stating that some sections and essays were better than others, he praised sections two and three, arguing that the best parts related to architectural topics, as well as favoring essays about districts and neighborhoods. He stated that Part I had unbalanced coverage that at times favored a pro-private interests market point of view, and that many essays did not have sufficient "social and critical analysis" and too much description. He also stated there was a dearth of content regarding to problems with the environment and "about racial and social disparities".

David L. Prytherch of the University of Miami wrote that it "makes the contribution of looking carefully and without undue prejudice at sprawling metropolis that increasingly defines urban life. "He added that it is a "highly specific and place-bound kind of book" which would generally just appeal to people already interested in studying Houston and was written with the assumption that the reader is such.

Wright stated that the introductions were "[c]ogent and well-written", and that "the book and its producers should be celebrated" as they "never fail to foreground the impossibility" of attempting to "initiate a definitive approach to Houston design".

The Journal of Southern History stated that it was "a remarkably effective analysis" and that "there is no better introduction to [Houston]."

Kaufman stated that it is "recommended especially for academic and regional collections on architecture and urban planning."

Dow wrote that "the volume is a testament to the excellence of the magazine that gave it life."
