= The Best American Short Stories 1975 =

1975 book

- Editor: Martha Foley
- Language: English
- Series: The Best American Short Stories
- Published: 1975
- Publisher: Houghton Mifflin Harcourt
- Publication date: September, 1975
- Media type: Print (hardback & paperback)
- ISBN: 978-0-395-20719-2
- Preceded by: The Best American Short Stories 1974
- Followed by: The Best American Short Stories 1976

The Best American Short Stories 1975, a volume in The Best American Short Stories series, was edited by Martha Foley. The volume was published by Houghton Mifflin Harcourt.

== Background ==
The series is considered one of the "best-known annual anthologies of short fiction" and has anthologized more than 2,000 short stories, including works by some of the most famous writers in contemporary American literature, curated by well-known guest editors since 1915. Specifically, Amy Hempel considered it and the O. Henry Award's prize anthology to compile "the best short fiction published in American and Canadian magazines during the preceding year."

In particular, the Willa Cather Review wrote that The Best American Short Stories series "became a repository of values" for creative writing programs and literary magazines, specifically with considerable "influence" in college libraries, short fiction courses, and fiction workshops.

== Short stories included ==
Author	Story	Source
Russell Banks	"The Lie"	Fiction International
Donald Barthelme	"The School"	The New Yorker
Rosellen Brown	"How to Win"	The Massachusetts Review
Jerry Bumpus	"Desert Matinee"	Fiction International
Frederick Busch	"Bambi Meets the Furies"	The Ohio Review
Nancy Chaikin	"Waiting for Astronauts"	The Colorado Quarterly
Mary Clearman	"Paths Unto the Dead"	The Georgia Review
Lyll Becerra De Jenkins	"Tyranny"	The New Yorker
Andre Dubus	"Cadence"	The Sewanee Review
Jesse Hill Ford	"Big Boy"	Atlantic Monthly
William Hoffman	"The Spirit in Me"	The Sewanee Review
Evan Hunter	"The Analyst"	Playboy
Paul Kaser	"How Jerem Came Home"	The Colorado Quarterly
Alistair MacLeod	"The Lost Salt Gift of Blood"	The Southern Review
Jack Matthews	"The Burial"	The Georgia Review
Eugene McNamara	"The Howard Parker Montcrief Hoax"	The Canadian Fiction Magazine
Reynolds Price	"Night and Day at Panacea"	Harper's Magazine
Abraham Rothberg	"Polonaise"	The Massachusetts Review
Leslie Silko	"Lullaby"	Chicago Review
Barry Targan	"The Man Who Lived"	The Southern Review
Jose Yglesias	"The American Sickness"	The Massachusetts Review
