= Jack Gance =

Jack Gance may refer to:

- Jack Gance (businessman), a founder of Chemist Warehouse
- Jack Gance, a 1989 novel by Ward Just
