= Houston GLBT Community Center =

- Formation: March 23, 1996
- Headquarters: Houston, Texas

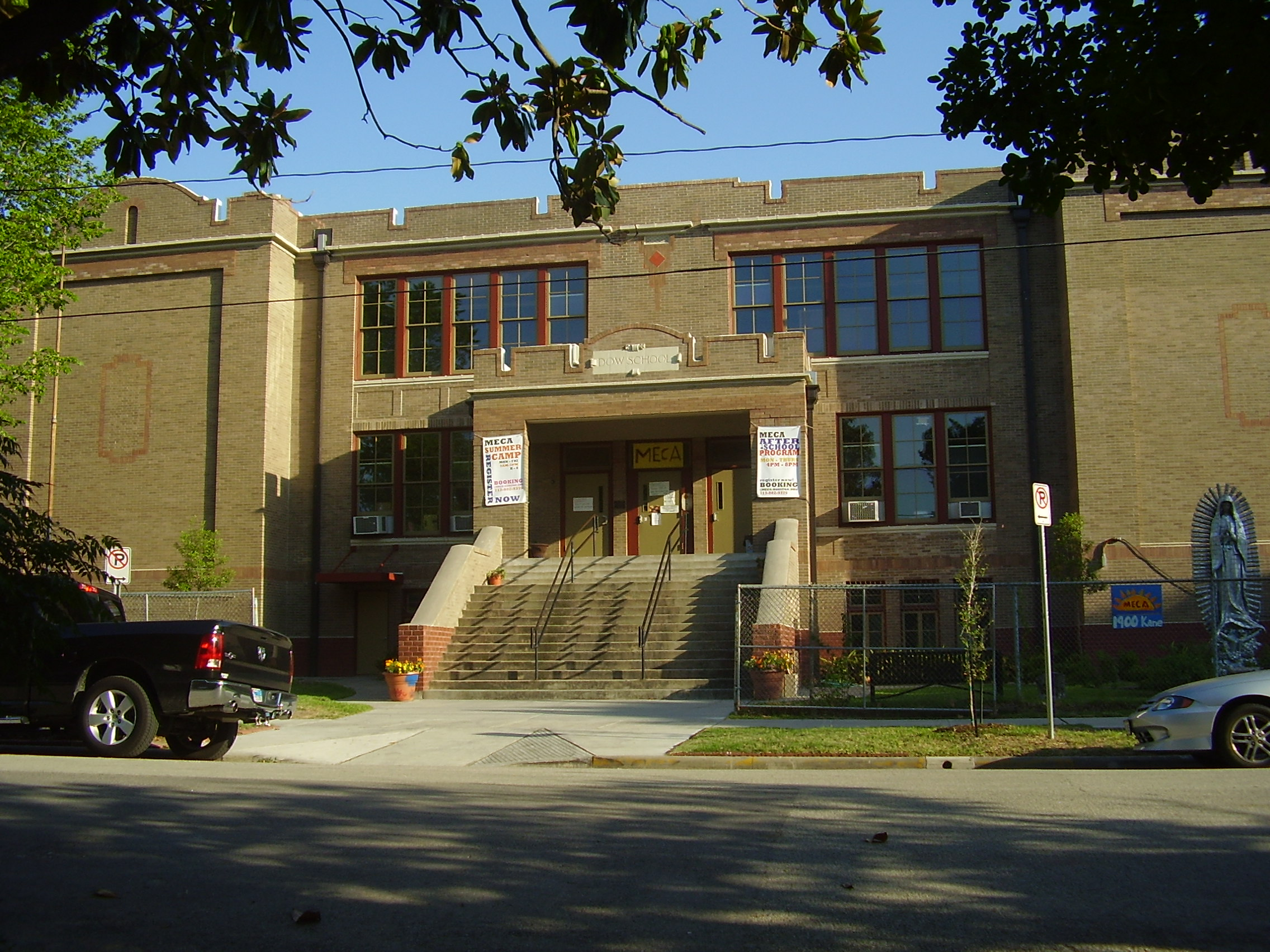
The Dow School in the Sixth Ward was the headquarters

The Houston GLBT Community Center was a community center for gay, lesbian, bisexual, and transgender people and their allies in the Houston metropolitan area and southeast Texas. Its last location was in the Dow School building in the Sixth Ward of Houston.

The Center was a nonprofit all-volunteer nonprofit organization whose mission was "to empower, educate, and nurture individuals of diverse sexual orientations and gender identities, generating a sense of community by providing for their social, emotional, and physical well being."

== Programs ==
The Center provided programs in five broad areas:

1. Arts and culture
2. Collaborations with other organizations
3. Education and public policy
4. Information resources
5. Support groups/Leadership development

The Center maintained the John Lawrence and Tyrone Garner Scholarship Fund of the Houston GLBT Community Center. Each year in June, the Center awarded these scholarships through the fund established in honor of John Lawrence and the late Tyrone Garner, who were the co-petitioners in the landmark Lawrence v. Texas case. The 2003 Supreme Court decision in that case overturned sodomy laws in the United States. The initial press conference after the ruling (with over 40 national and international media representatives present) was held at the Center and the rally at City Hall was organized by the Center.

The Center hosted a weekly coming-out group for gay, lesbian, bisexual, transgender, and questioning individuals, a monthly First Saturday Queer Bingo and art shows at the Center and throughout Houston, and facilitated the quarterly Community Leaders Networking Group as well as the Houston GLBT Business Council.

It also provided low-cost and free meeting and office space to eligible nonprofits. Numerous Houston organizations have previously had office space at the Center, including Hatch Youth (formerly H.A.T.C.H., now a program of the Montrose Center); Houston chapter of Parents, Families and Friends of Lesbians and Gays (P-FLAG); Pride Committee of Houston; Q-Patrol; Greater Houston GLBT Chamber of Commerce; Houston GLBT Political Caucus; the Black Lesbian and Gay Coalition; the Texas Human Rights Foundation; Southern Poverty Law Center; and the LGBT Switchboard (formerly Gay and Lesbian Switchboard Houston; now a program of the Montrose Center). Ladies and Gentlemen of Art, a group focusing on African-American GLBT artists, and A Community United, a group focusing on providing housing on HIV positive individuals, were some of the last organizations to have offices at the Center.

== History ==
The Center was founded as the Houston Lesbian and Gay Community Center in 1996 by a group of activists. The Center moved into its first facility at 803 Hawthorne Avenue in 1998 during the administration of Brian J. Tognotti, the first president of the Center, and moved a suite at 3400 Montrose Boulevard in early 2003 during the first presidency of Timothy Brookover. In 2003, under the leadership of then Center president Burton Bagby-Grose, the name and mission statement were changed to include bisexual and transgender people. In 2010, after the mid-rise 3400 Montrose building was condemned, the center relocated to the Dow School Building in Houston's historic Sixth Ward district. Coinciding with its 15th anniversary, the center was named Organization Grand Marshal of Pride Houston's annual LGBT pride parade.

The Montrose Center (formerly Montrose Counseling Center) is widely recognized as the primary gathering place for LGBT-oriented organizations in and around Houston.

== See also ==
- LGBT rights in Texas
- Homosocialization
