= The Best American Short Stories 1971 =

1971 short story anthology

- Editor: Martha Foley
- Language: English
- Series: The Best American Short Stories
- Publisher: Houghton Mifflin Harcourt
- Publication date: November 1, 1971
- Media type: Print
- ISBN: 978-0261632363
- Preceded by: The Best American Short Stories 1970
- Followed by: The Best American Short Stories 1972

The Best American Short Stories 1971 is a volume in The Best American Short Stories series edited by Martha Foley. The volume was published by Houghton Mifflin Harcourt.

== Background ==
The series is considered one of the "best-known annual anthologies of short fiction" and has anthologized more than 2,000 short stories, including works by some of the most famous writers in contemporary American literature.

In particular, the Willa Cather Review wrote that The Best American Short Stories series "became a repository of values" for creative writing programs, college libraries, and literary magazines. The Los Angeles Times, reflecting on the hundred-year anniversary of the series, noted that it eventually became an "institution" itself, often being taught in classrooms.

== Short stories included ==
Author	Story	Source	
1971	Russell Banks	"With Ché in New Hampshire"	New American Review
1971	Hal Bennett	"Dotson Gerber Resurrected"	Playboy
1971	James Blake	"The Widow, Bereft"	Esquire
1971	Jack Cady	"I Take Care of Things"	The Yale Review
1971	Robert Canzoneri	"Barbed Wire"	The Southern Review
1971	Albert Drake	"The Chicken Which Became a Rat"	Northwest Review
1971	William Eastlake	"The Dancing Boy"	Evergreen Review
1971	Beth Harvor	"Pain Was My Portion"	The Hudson Review
1971	David Madden	"No Trace"	The Southern Review
1971	Don Mitchell	"Diesel"	Shenandoah
1971	Marion Montgomery	"The Decline and Fall of Officer Fergerson"	The Georgia Review
1971	Wright Morris	"Magic"	The Southern Review
1971	Philip F. O'Connor	"The Gift Bearer"	The Southern Review
1971	Tillie Olsen	"Requa I"	The Iowa Review
1971	Ivan Prashker	"Shirt Talk"	Harper's Magazine
1971	Norman Rush	"In Late Youth"	Epoch
1971	Danny Santiago	"The Somebody"	Redbook
1971	Jonathan Strong	"Xavier Fereira's Unfinished Book: Chapter One"	TriQuarterly
1971	Leonard Tushnet	"The Klausners"	Prairie Schooner
1971	W. D. Valgardson	"Bloodflowers"	Tamarack Review
1971	L. Woiwode	"The Suitor"	McCall's
