= Leonard Lopate =

American radio host (1940–2025)

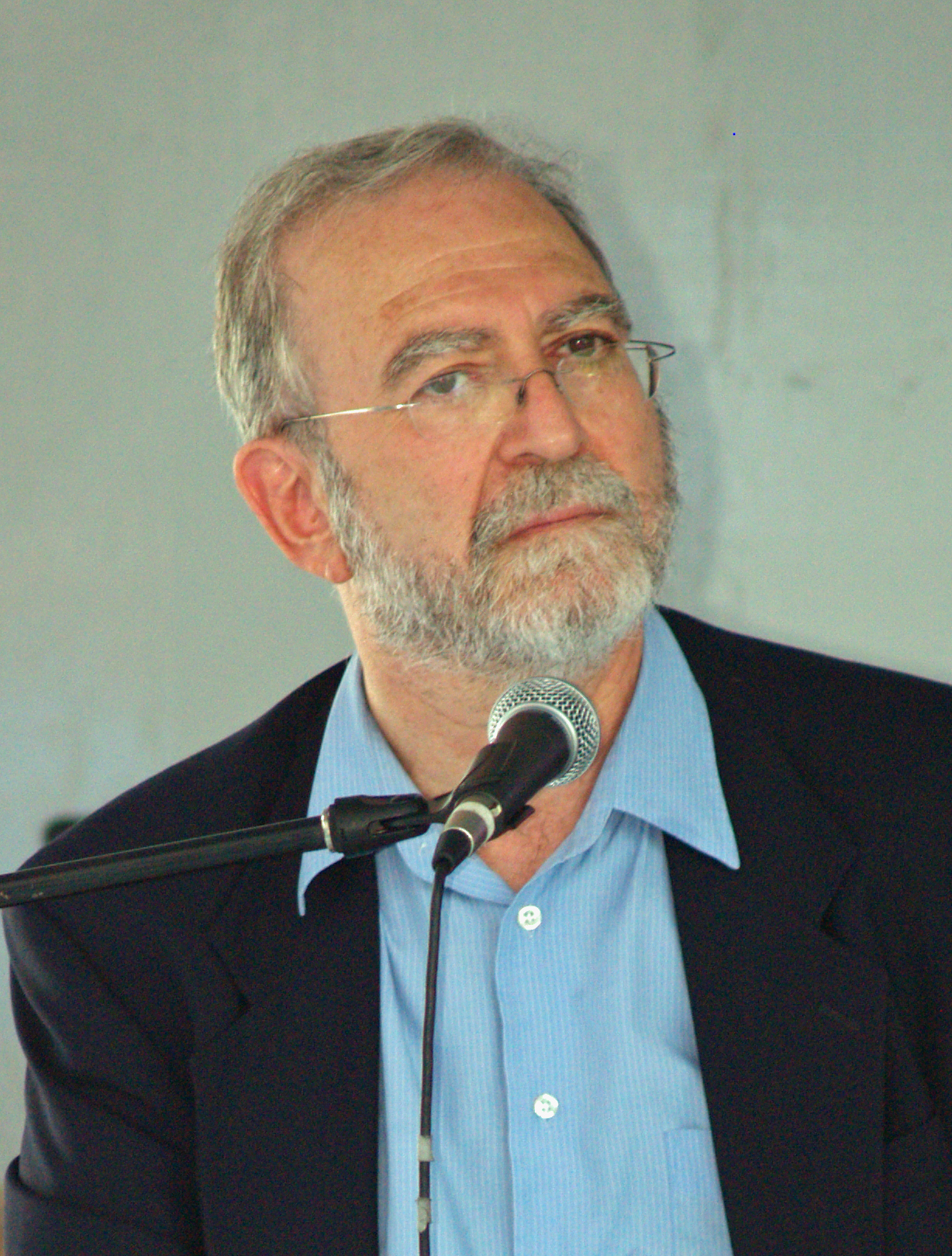
- Lopate in 2008
- Born: September 23, 1940; New York City, U.S.
- Died: August 5, 2025 (aged 84); New York City, U.S.
- Spouse: Melanie Baker (m. 2012, divorced)
- Children: 1
- Presenting career
- Show: Leonard Lopate at Large
- Stations: WBAI; WHDD
- Show: The Leonard Lopate Show
- Station: WNYC
- Style: Talk show host
- Country: United States
- Website: leonardlopateatlarge.com

Leonard Lopate (September 23, 1940 – August 5, 2025) was an American radio personality. He was the host of the radio talk show Leonard Lopate at Large, broadcast on WBAI, and the onetime host of the public radio talk show The Leonard Lopate Show, broadcast on WNYC. He first broadcast on WKCR, the college radio station of Columbia University, and then later on WBAI, before moving to WNYC.

== Early life and education ==
Lopate was born in Queens, New York City, on September 23, 1940, to Jewish parents, Fran Berlow, who was from a middle-class immigrant family in Boston, and Albert Lopate, whose mother tongue was Yiddish and who was an aspiring writer. His parents ran a candy store together and had a tumultuous marriage, and he was raised in relative poverty in tenements in Williamsburg. As a teenager, he joined the local Orthodox Jewish choir. He graduated from Eastern District High School.

He studied at the Pratt Institute in Brooklyn and at an art school in London. In 1967, he graduated with a Bachelor of Arts degree from Brooklyn College. He then undertook postgraduate work at Hunter College, where he trained as a painter (he studied with Ad Reinhardt and Mark Rothko), and worked in advertising for fifteen years.

== Career ==
In the 1970s, Lopate worked in the advertising departments of a number of New York department stores and also worked marketing country records. During this time, he became the host of a jazz show on WKCR, the radio station of Columbia University. In 1977, he moved to WBAI. For eight years, he hosted a program on gospel music and later hosted a weekly late-night talk show called Round Midnight. The show ran through the mid-1980s, ending when Lopate moved to WNYC-FM in 1985 to host a midday talk show with radio veteran Pegeen Fitzgerald, which subsequently evolved into The Leonard Lopate Show.

Lopate also appeared regularly at the 92nd Street Y, where he interviewed celebrities and moderated his panel series "Comparing Notes". He appeared in a similar capacity at the Brooklyn Academy of Music, Queens College, Brooklyn College, the New York Public Library, the Brooklyn Public Library, the Alliance Française, and The New School. He also created a series of discussions on literature for the writers' organization, PEN International.

=== The Leonard Lopate Show ===
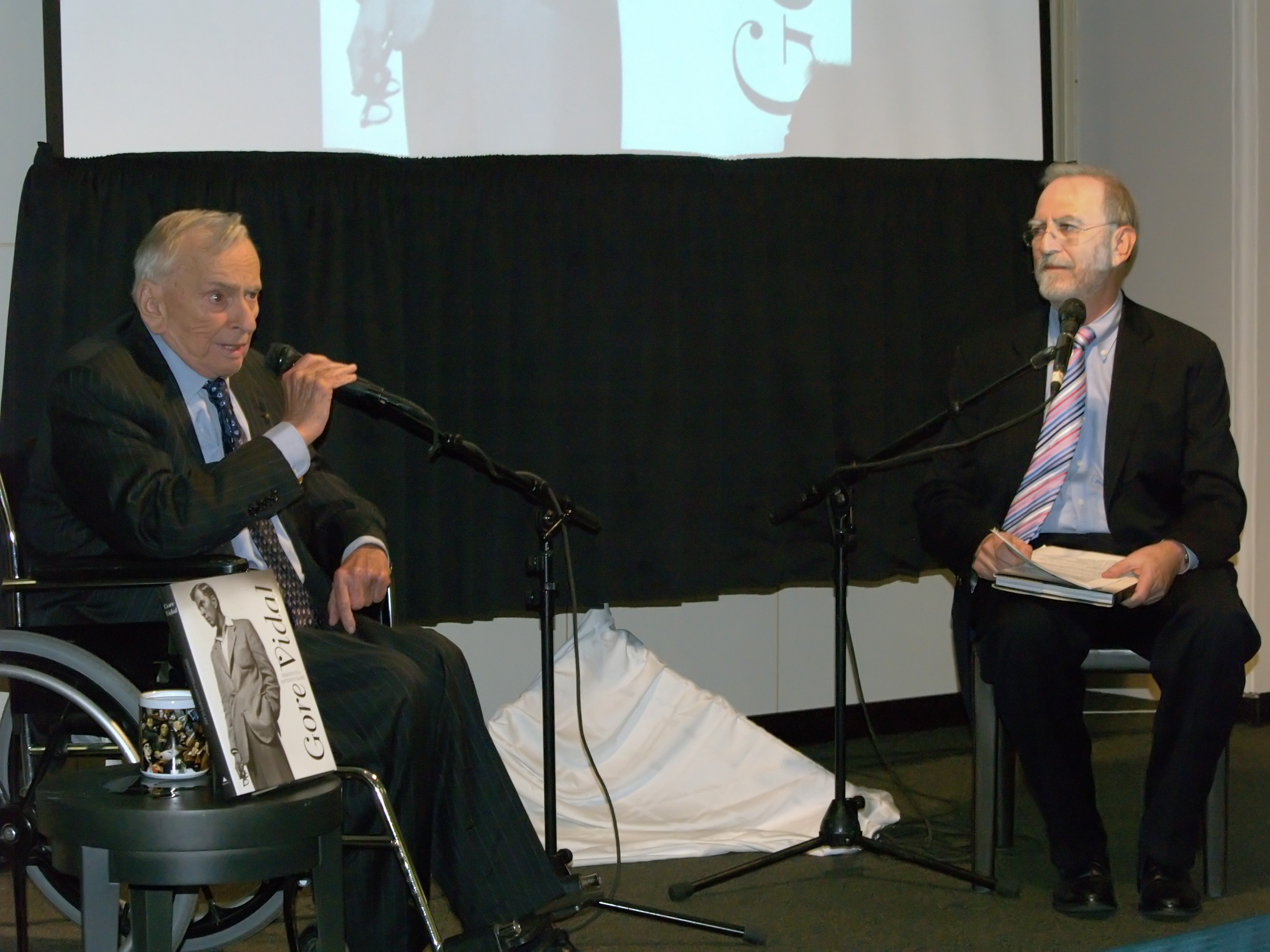
Gore Vidal with Lopate in 2009

The Leonard Lopate Show, initially called New York & Company, aired on WNYC from noon to 2 p.m. every weekday until December 2017. The show's format typically consisted of four interviews ranging from twenty to forty minutes in length and covered a broad range of topics including current events, history, literature, the arts, including jazz and gospel music, food and wine, and science. Guests were often interviewed to accompany a book release. Lopate interviewed politicians, poets, painters, novelists, filmmakers, actors, dancers, and Nobel and Pulitzer Prize winners. He frequently interviewed actors, playwrights, and producers to talk about their current NYC theatre productions.

Lopate introduced two ongoing features to the program. One was called "Please Explain", in which he talked with experts on a wide variety of topics that were not tied to book or movie releases and could be described as general interest. In 2006, some of the "Please Explain" topics he delved into included sainthood, nanotechnology, insomnia, infertility, and meditation. The other feature was called "Underreported", in which Lopate delved deeply into political and social issues deemed not to have received sufficient media coverage.

For the show's twentieth anniversary, in 2005, Tom Brokaw interviewed Lopate about the history of the show, Lopate's goals, and Lopate's interviewing style.

In February 2017, a producer discussed with human resources at WNYC multiple comments Lopate had made to her that she considered sexually provocative. While she did not consider any single comment to be "fireable", she said the comments made her feel uncomfortable. The February incident led to an investigation that "resulted in one-on-one anti-harassment training for him and a warning to Lopate that he was creating an uncomfortable work environment." In March 2017, "a second producer filed a complaint against Lopate... describing comments she felt were inappropriate."

On December 21, 2017, amidst the MeToo movement, WNYC fired both Lopate and Jonathan Schwartz, stating that investigations found that each individual had violated WNYC's standards "for providing an inclusive, appropriate, and respectful work environment"; they had been placed on leave 15 days earlier pending investigations. One producer complained that, as she was preparing for a segment about a cookbook, Lopate informed her that the name "avocado" comes from the Aztec word for "testicle". Another producer said that when she wore a new dress, Lopate said, "I didn't know you were so 'bosomy'." Lopate's former show was then replaced by Midday on WNYC, which had a rotating array of hosts and followed a format similar to that of The Leonard Lopate Show. WNYC abandoned that show for All of It with host Alison Stewart on September 17, 2018.

=== Leonard Lopate at Large ===
On July 16, 2018, Lopate came back to the radio waves as the host of the Leonard Lopate at Large show on WBAI. Lopate stated that he intended to "pick up exactly where we left off". Lopate continued to work on the show until his death.

== Awards and honors ==
In 2006, The Leonard Lopate Show won a James Beard Foundation Award for the segment A Nose Knows, an interview with Ruth Reichl, Daniel Boulud, and Marcia Pelchat about how smell affects taste. In 2007, the show won a second James Beard Award for the segment Holiday Recipe Swap with Michael Lomonaco. In 2009, the show won its third James Beard Award for the segment 3-Ingredient Challenge in which chef and cookbook writer Rozanne Gold came up with recipes for callers who had three ingredients in their kitchens. In 2012, he won a George Foster Peabody Award for broadcast excellence.

== Personal life and death ==
Lopate's younger brother is the writer Phillip Lopate. His mother, Frances Lopate, was an actress. Lopate discussed their mother with Phillip on his show on February 22, 2017.

Lopate married three times, his latter marriage being to artist Melanie Baker; both ended in divorce.

Lopate died of ALS at his home in Brooklyn, on August 5, 2025, at the age of 84.
