= Sixth Ward, Houston =

Community in Texas, United States

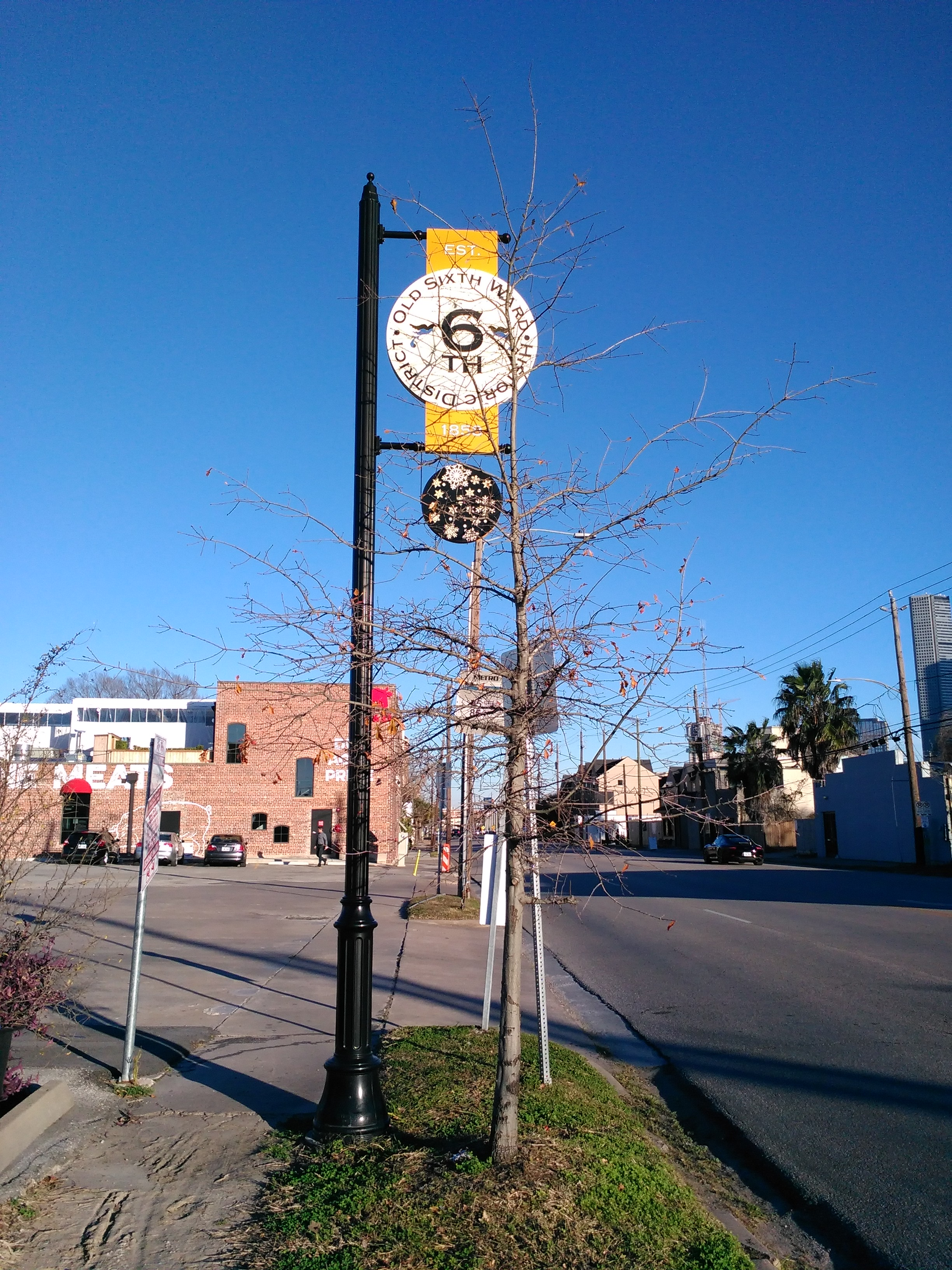
Old Sixth Ward sign

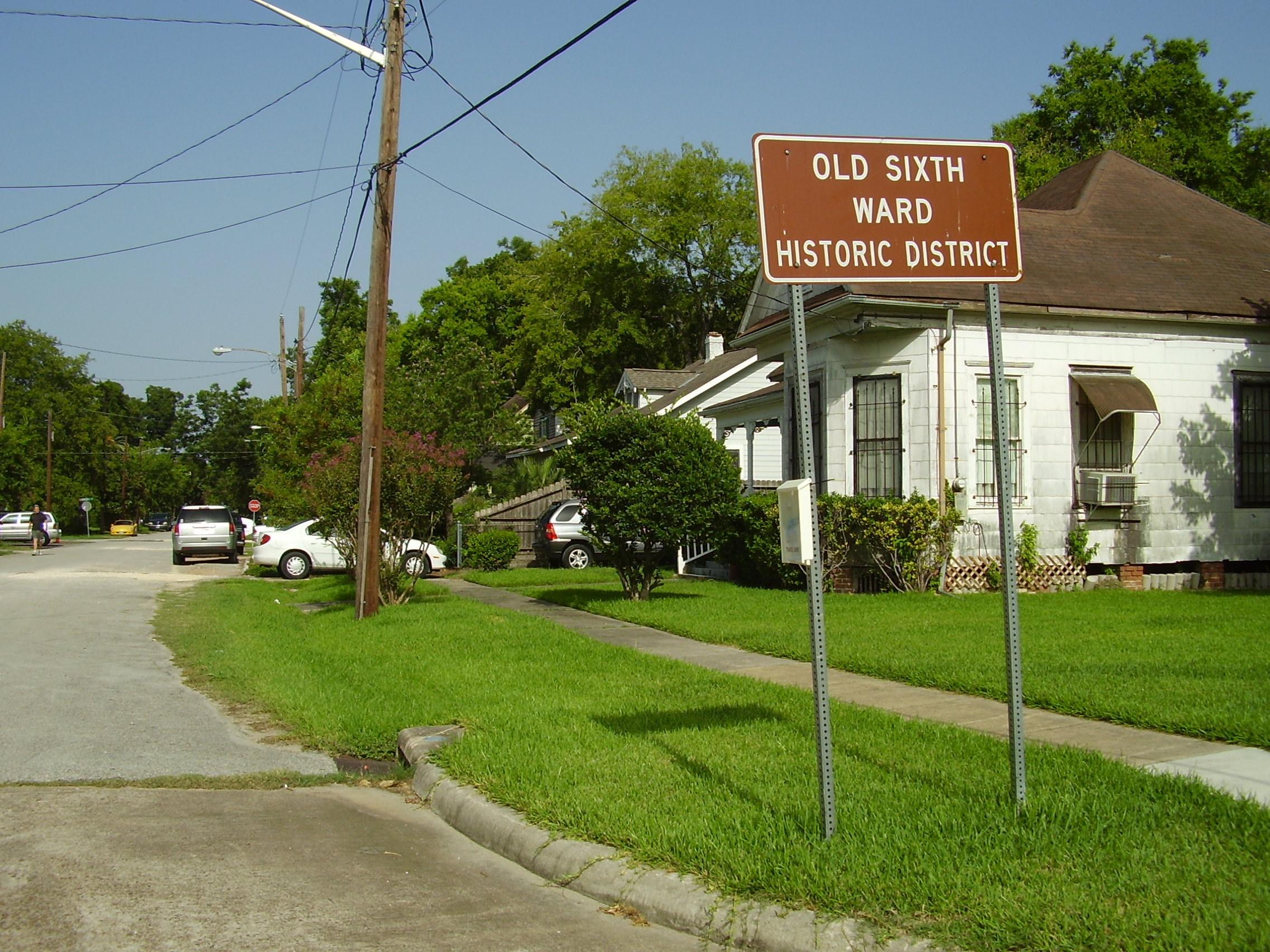
Old Sixth Ward Historic District

The Sixth Ward is a community in Houston, Texas, United States, one of the city's historic wards.

== History ==
The area now called the Old Sixth Ward was originally part of a two-league Mexican land grant made to John Austin in 1824. Two years after the Allen Brothers purchased the grant from Mr. Austin's estate in 1836 to establish the city of Houston, Mr. S.P. Hollingsworth filed a survey of the western environs of downtown Houston which included today's Old Sixth Ward which he divided into large, narrow tracts that ran northward from Buffalo Bayou. By January 1839, several tracts within the Hollingsworth survey had been sold to several prominent Houstonians, including W.R. Baker, James S. Holman, Archibald Wynns, Nathan Kempton and Henry Allen. By 1858, Mr. Baker and his colleagues owned or held mortgages on most of the land in this area. In that same year Mr. Baker engaged the County Surveyor, Mr. Samuel West, to restructure his holdings by replotting them into a lot and block system that defines today's Old Sixth Ward. The new survey was laid out to the true north as opposed to downtown which was platted at a 45-degree angle to true north. The first sale after the re-platting took place on January 31, 1859, when Mr. Baker sold several blocks to Mr. W.W. Leeland. Construction of homes on the lots began in 1860, but a building boom did not take off until approximately ten years later when Washington Avenue was re-graded.

The Sixth Ward was created out of the northern part of the Fourth Ward, and is the only ward that does not extend into downtown Houston's historical center, although a fraction of what used to be the ward is considered to be within the boundaries of downtown. The Sixth Ward was designated in 1874, and created in 1877.

One area of the Sixth Ward was historically called "Chaneyville." The Sixth Ward also has the streets "Chaney Court" and "Chaney Lane." According to Ann Quin Wilson, a historian and a retired land researcher, the "Chaney" name likely originated from the area around the "Chaney Junction," the first railroad stop on the Houston to Washington-on-the-Brazos route of the Houston & Texas Central Railroad.

In 1978 the Sixth Ward Historic District was established as part of the National Register of Historic Places and was Harris County's first such district.

From the 1980 U.S. Census to the 1990 Census, the population of the Sixth Ward declined by more than 1,000 people per square mile.

In 2007, several community leaders posted YouTube videos advocating for preservation in the Sixth Ward. Larissa Lindsay, president of the Old Sixth Ward Neighborhood Association, said that the videos were "creative desperation."

In 2008 the Old Sixth Ward neighborhood celebrated the sesquicentennial of its founding.

== Composition ==
=== Old Sixth Ward ===
The Sixth Ward is home to the oldest intact neighborhood in Houston, known as the "Old Sixth Ward." Apart from Galveston, the Old Sixth Ward has the greatest concentration of Victorian homes in the region. As of 2007, 300 houses that had been built between 1854 and 1935 remained.

Old Sixth Ward lies on the western edge of downtown Houston, bounded by Memorial Drive to the south, Glenwood Cemetery to the west, Washington Avenue to the north, and Houston Avenue to the east.

Old Sixth Ward is recognized for its historic homes. It was listed on the National Register of Historic Places in 1978, making it the first neighborhood in Houston to be placed on the Register. The Houston City Council followed suit on June 25, 1998, designating Old Sixth Ward a Historic District.

Although Old Sixth Ward contains many homes from the late 19th century, Houston's lax preservation laws, allowing demolition of most historic properties after a 90-day wait, may eventually eliminate this historic area. Many homes considered teardowns have been restored. The Old Sixth Ward Neighborhood Association is working to save the historic housing stock for generations of Houstonians to come.

The Houston Press dubbed the Old Sixth Ward the 2006 "Best Hidden Neighborhood."

Author and Houston's first poet laureate Gwendolyn Zepeda grew up in the Old Sixth Ward.

On August 1, 2007, the city of Houston approved an ordinance protecting the Old Sixth Ward and thereby prevented the demolition of over 200 buildings.

In 2007, the Houston Chronicle said, "While many old homes have been saved and renovated in the Old Sixth Ward just northwest of downtown, that area is an exception" to the general trend of city officials and city residents allowing the destruction of historic houses.

=== Vinegar Hill ===
Before the development of the interstate system in the mid-20th century, there was an area at the eastern terminus of Washington Avenue named "Vinegar Hill." The writer Sigman Byrd, active from the late 1940s until the early 1960s, wrote about it, and the writings were published in Sig Byrd's Houston. Byrd, who frequently wrote for the previous Houston Press and later the Houston Chronicle, described it as "a kind of arrogant slum ... scowling down on a good portion of the proud new city itself." By 1994 Vinegar Hill had been demolished.

== Education ==
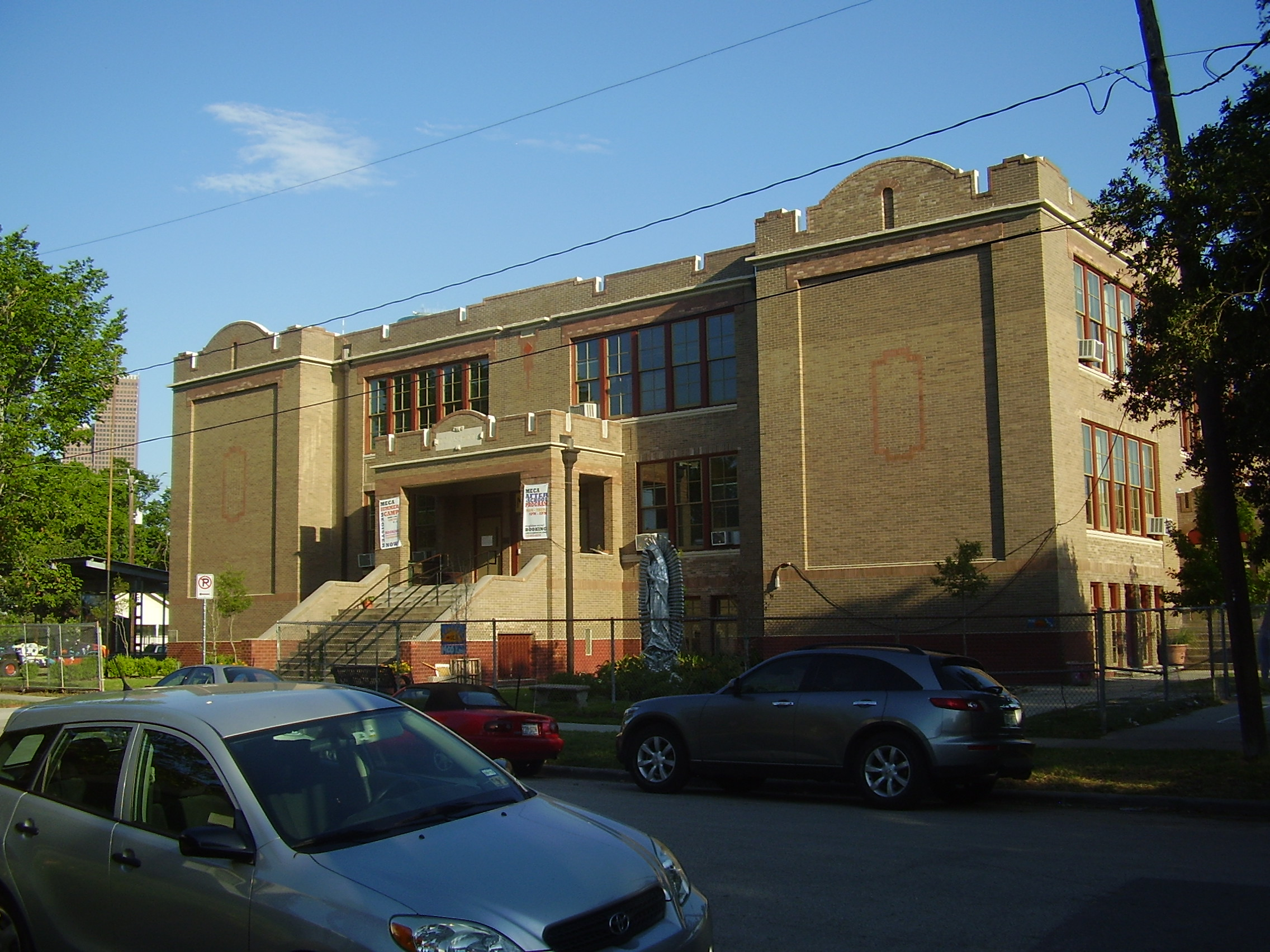
The former Dow Elementary School

The Sixth Ward is zoned to Houston ISD schools, which include Crockett Elementary School, Hogg Middle School, and Heights High School (formerly Reagan High School).

Dow Elementary School moved to its Old Sixth Ward location at 1900 Kane Street in 1912 and closed in 1991-1993. The afterschool program Multicultural Education and Counseling through the Arts (MECA) is located in the former Dow building. HISD began leasing the Dow building, which had been constructed in 1912, to MECA in 1993, charging MECA $1 per year for a 15 period frame. As part of the agreement, MECA began enacting renovations so the building can meet current life safety and accessibility codes. MECA received the title to the Dow building in 2004. The building also houses the Houston GLBT Community Center. Dow was named after Justin E. Dow. Dow was superintendent of Houston Public Schools from 1885 to 1887 and had served as the principal of Houston High School from 1882 to 1885.

Brock Elementary School served a portion of the Sixth Ward area until its closing in 2006 and repurposing as an early childhood center. Students zoned to Brock were rezoned to Crockett.

Harper Elementary and Junior High on Center Street was the primary school for Blacks in the area.

== Government and infrastructure ==
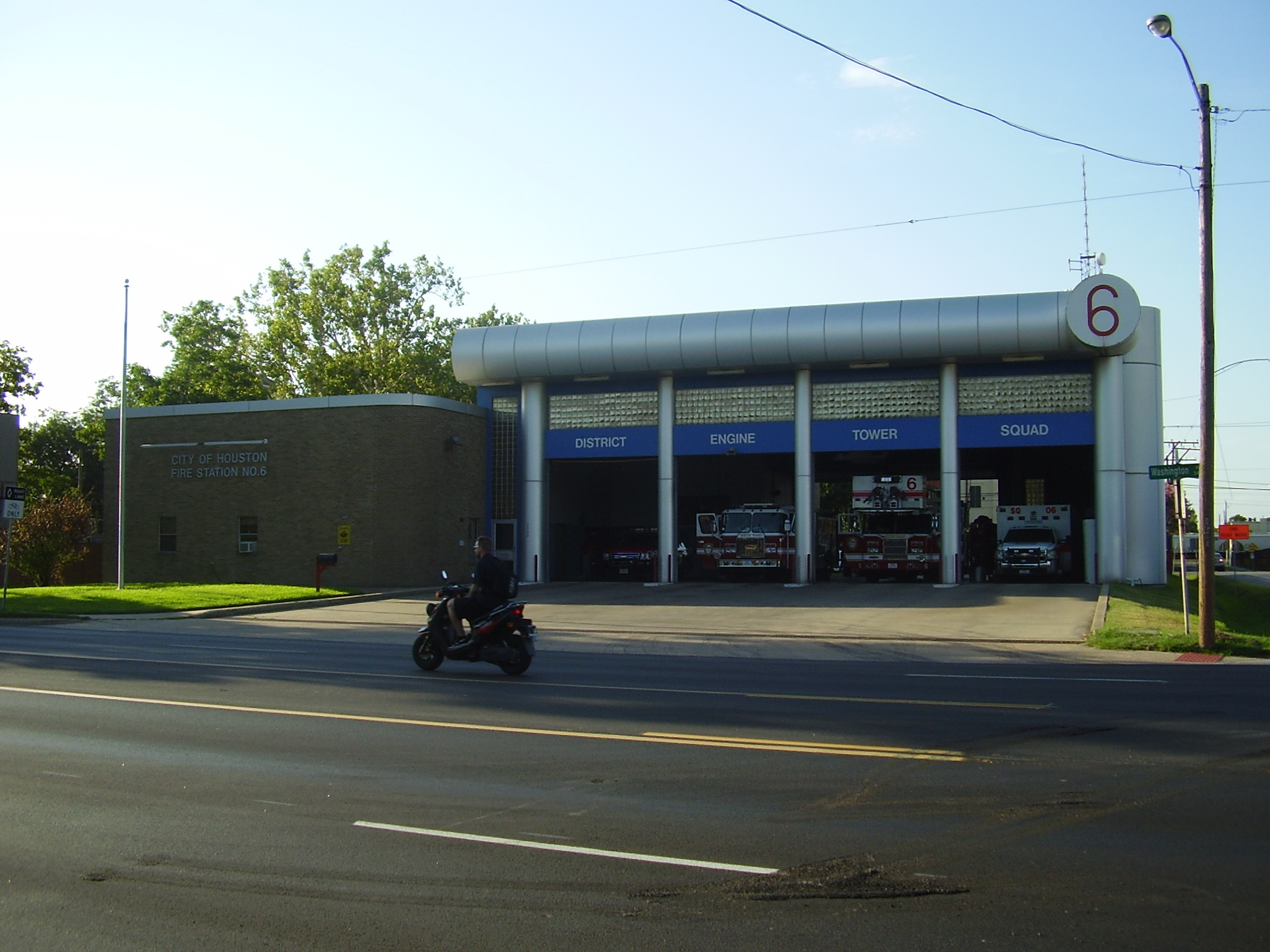
Fire Station 6 Sixth Ward

The community is within the Houston Police Department's Central Patrol Division, headquartered at 61 Riesner in the Sixth Ward area. In the early 1950s the Houston Police Department moved its headquarters to a facility in the Sixth Ward and purchased the Eisele House, formerly a private house. The agency used the house as part of its "HPD Explorer" program. As of 2010 the house is unused. The City of Houston Municipal Court building is located in the complex with the police station.

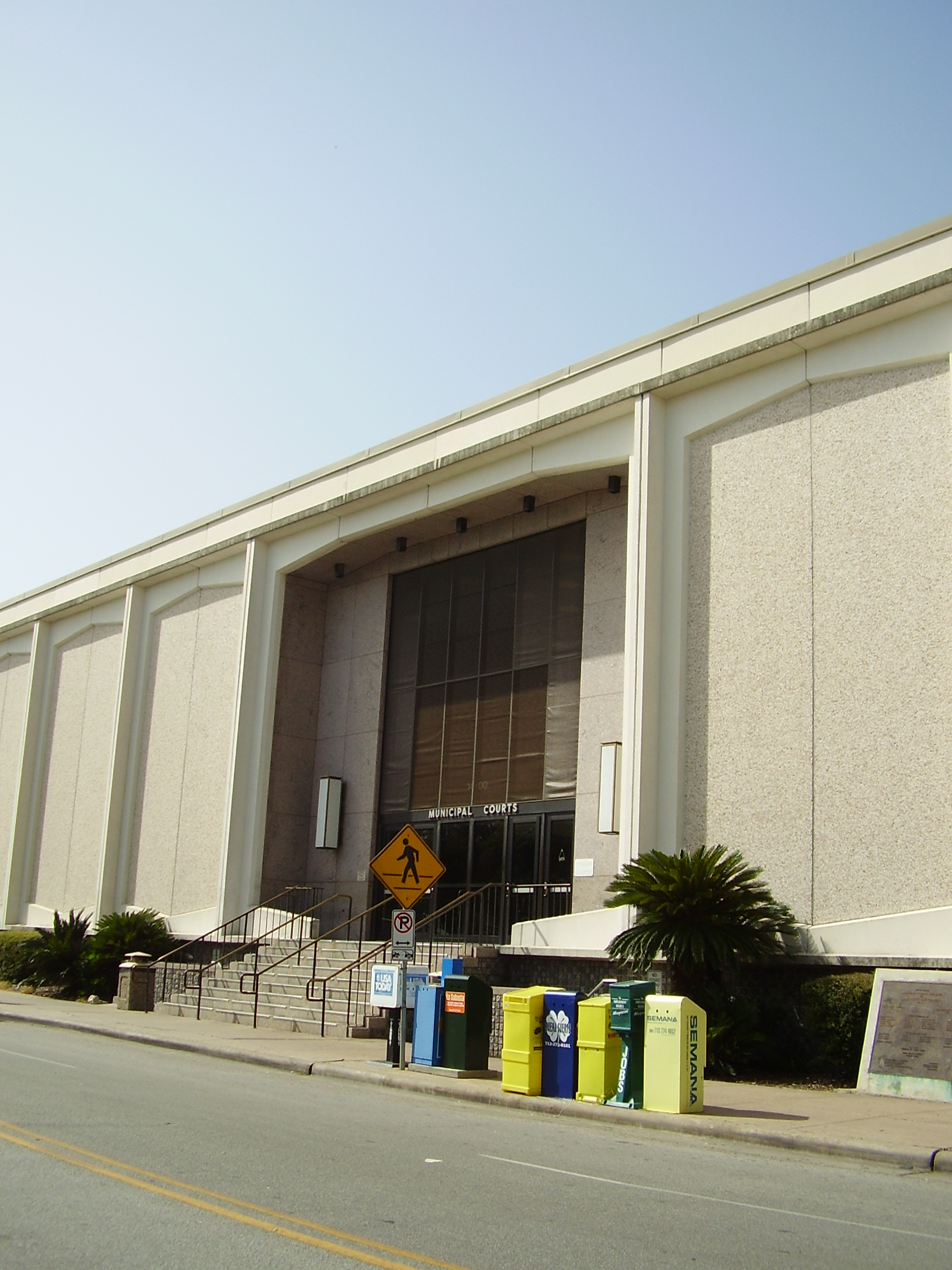
Houston Municipal Courts

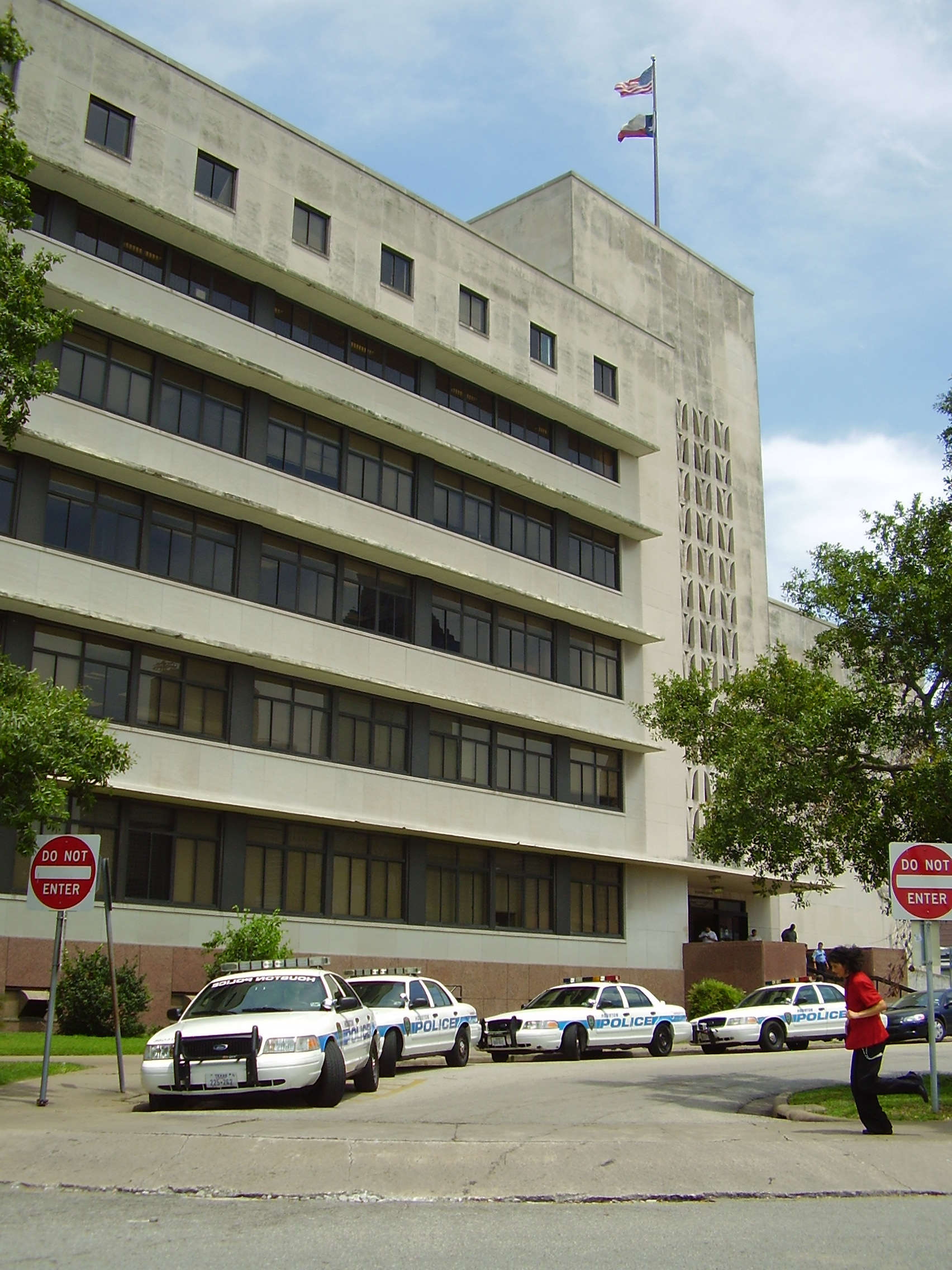
Houston Police Department Central Patrol Division Station

The Houston Fire Department operates Station 6 Sixth Ward.

The Sixth Ward is in Texas's 18th congressional district. Its current U.S. Representative is Sheila Jackson Lee.

Harris Health System (formerly Harris County Hospital District) designated Casa de Amigos Health Center in the Near Northside for ZIP code 77007. The nearest public hospital is Ben Taub General Hospital in the Texas Medical Center.

=== Architecture styles ===
Old Sixth Ward housing stock evidences five main architectural styles:

Gulf Coast Colonial/Greek Revival style (1850–1890). These houses are usually five bay cottages with a full-length front porch tucked in under the main roof line. This style of house is predominantly found in southern Louisiana and coastal Texas. The style represents an adaptation of Greek Revival architecture popular in the northeast to the gulf coast climate.

Folk Victorian Style (1870–1910). These houses represent a vernacular attempt to adapt Victorian style architecture to the gulf coast climate. The houses featured locally made porch posts and gingerbread. In many cases the Folk Victorian house is actually a Gulf Coast Colonial cottage draped or altered with later Victorian elements.

Queen Anne Style (1880–1910). These houses are noted for their prominent gables, variety of shingle treatments, ornate factory-made millwork, abundance of stained-glass windows, and tall roof lines. These houses reflect a national trend in architecture that took the country by storm at the end of the 19th century.

Classical Revival Style (1895–1920). These houses are characterized by simple Greek columns, restrained exterior ornament, and wide roof overhangs. The period during which they were built is marked by the decline of Victorian extravagance and a new interest in the antiquities of Greece and Rome.

Bungalow Style (1900–1940). These houses reflect a new utilitarian trend in architecture. Bungalows are noted for their prominent porches, their lack of foyers, and their perfectly proportioned rooms.
