= Cite (magazine) =

Architecture magazine

- Frequency: Quarterly
- First issue: August 1982; 43 years ago
- Company: Rice Design Alliance
- Country: United States
- Based in: Houston, Texas
- Language: English
- Website: offcite.org
- ISSN: 8755-0415

Cite: The Architecture and Design Magazine of Houston is a quarterly magazine published by the Rice Design Alliance, a program of the Rice University School of Architecture.

== History and profile ==
Cite was established in 1982. Its topics include architecture, urban planning, historical preservation, and the arts. The magazine was established to provide coverage of architectural criticism that had hitherto been absent in publications. Barrie Scardino, William F. Stern, and Bruce C. Webb, the editors of the book Ephemeral City, a collection of essays from Cite, stated that the magazine had a "tough love" attitude towards the City of Houston. The writers are/were from Rice University and the University of Houston, and either held formal academic positions or otherwise were considered intellectuals of the architecture sphere.

In 2005 Judith K. De Jong of the University of Illinois at Chicago wrote that "That such an initiative has not only lasted, but has also thrived, is testament to the importance of such a publication about Houston, and, by extension, about places like Houston." According to De Jong, the fact that the publication caters to ordinary people as well as specialists, its comprehensive coverage of topics, and its "excellent, provocative writing and criticism" contributed to its "longevity".

== Derivative works ==
Ephemeral City re-published twenty-five Cite essays originally published from 1982 to 2000.

== See also ==
- Magazines in Houston
