= Rice University School of Architecture =

Architecture school at Rice University (Texas)

Coordinates: 29.7189°N 95.3998°W

Rice School of Architecture
- Type: Private
- Established: 1912
- Dean: Igor Marjanović
- Location: Houston, Texas, United States
- Website: arch.rice.edu

Rice School of Architecture, also referred to as Rice Architecture, is the architecture school of Rice University in Houston, Texas. The graduate and undergraduate programs in architecture foreground design, history/theory, technology, and culture as critical academic subjects. The school maintains an enrollment of just under 200 students. Established in 1912 as the Department of Architecture with Rice University’s founding, the School of Architecture’s faculty consists of about twenty full-time architectural practitioners, historians, and theoreticians.

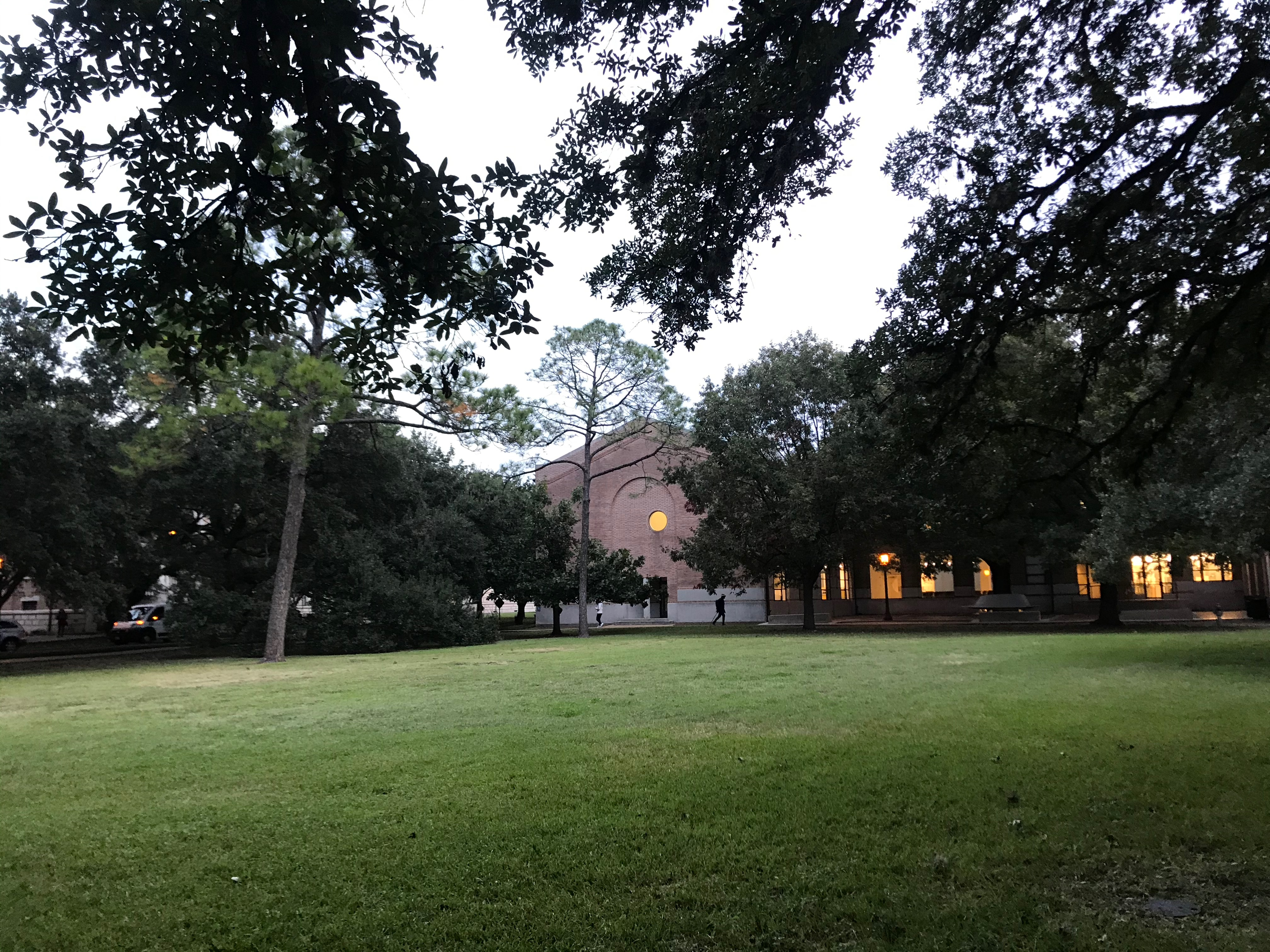
Anderson Hall at sunset

== Construct ==
Construct is Rice Architecture’s design-build program. Established in 1996 as the Rice Building Workshop, Construct saw through a number of student design-built projects, often in collaboration with non-profit organizations such as Project Row Houses and Workshop Houston. Construct projects are often integrated with Totalization studio projects, during which students develop detailed proposals that could be potentially built in Houston. Assistant Professor Andrew Colopy is the current CoDirector of Construct with Professor-in-Practice Danny Samuels.

== Rice Architecture Paris ==
The Rice School of Architecture Paris (RSAP) program allows graduate students and 5th year undergraduates to participate in semester-long studies in Paris. The satellite school was founded, and is currently directed by John J. Casbarian, FAIA, the Harry and Albert K. Smith Professor of Architecture. Students apply to either the fall or spring session in Paris.

== Wortham Fellows ==
Every two years the school recruits two Wortham Fellows, who are early career practitioners or scholars. Fellows teach three classes per year, typically two studios and a research seminar, and develop a body of design research topics during their two-year stay.

== Facilities ==
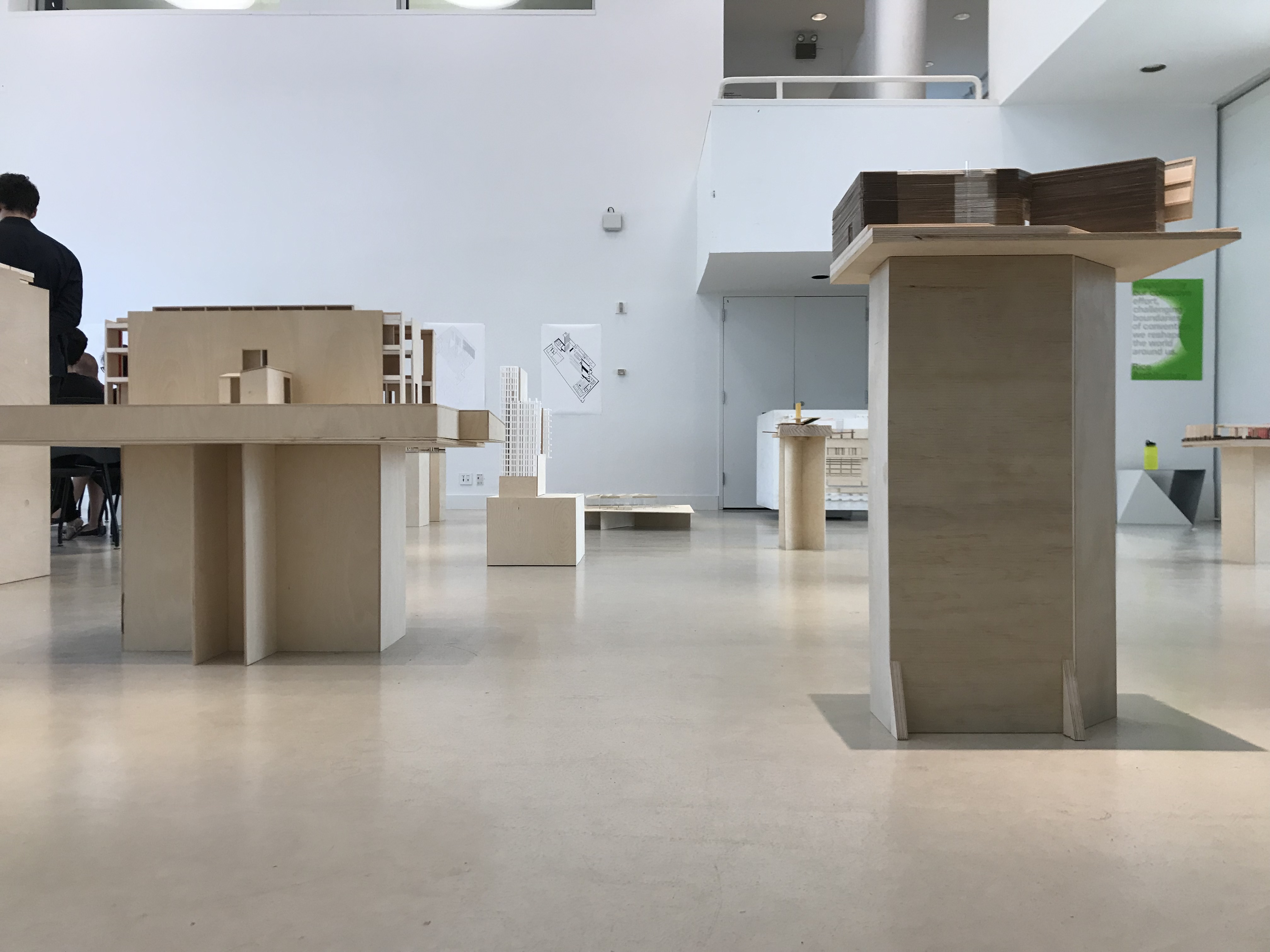
models in Farish Gallery

The school is housed in MD Anderson Hall, off the main academic quadrangle of the University. The building was designed by architects Staub & Rather, in consultation with Architecture School Chairman William Ward Watkin. As enrollment expanded, the building capacity was extended with an addition by James Stirling. Aside from studio spaces, the building also houses support facilities such as fabrication shops and an advanced computer lab/classrooms. The centerpiece of the school, located at the intersection of old and new wings, contains the Farish Gallery, Jury Room, and Bridge. The Farish Gallery doubles as a Jury room and a space for all school lectures. The bridge serves as a space for informal reviews and pin-ups. Students are encouraged to work on campus and in the studio with their cohorts.

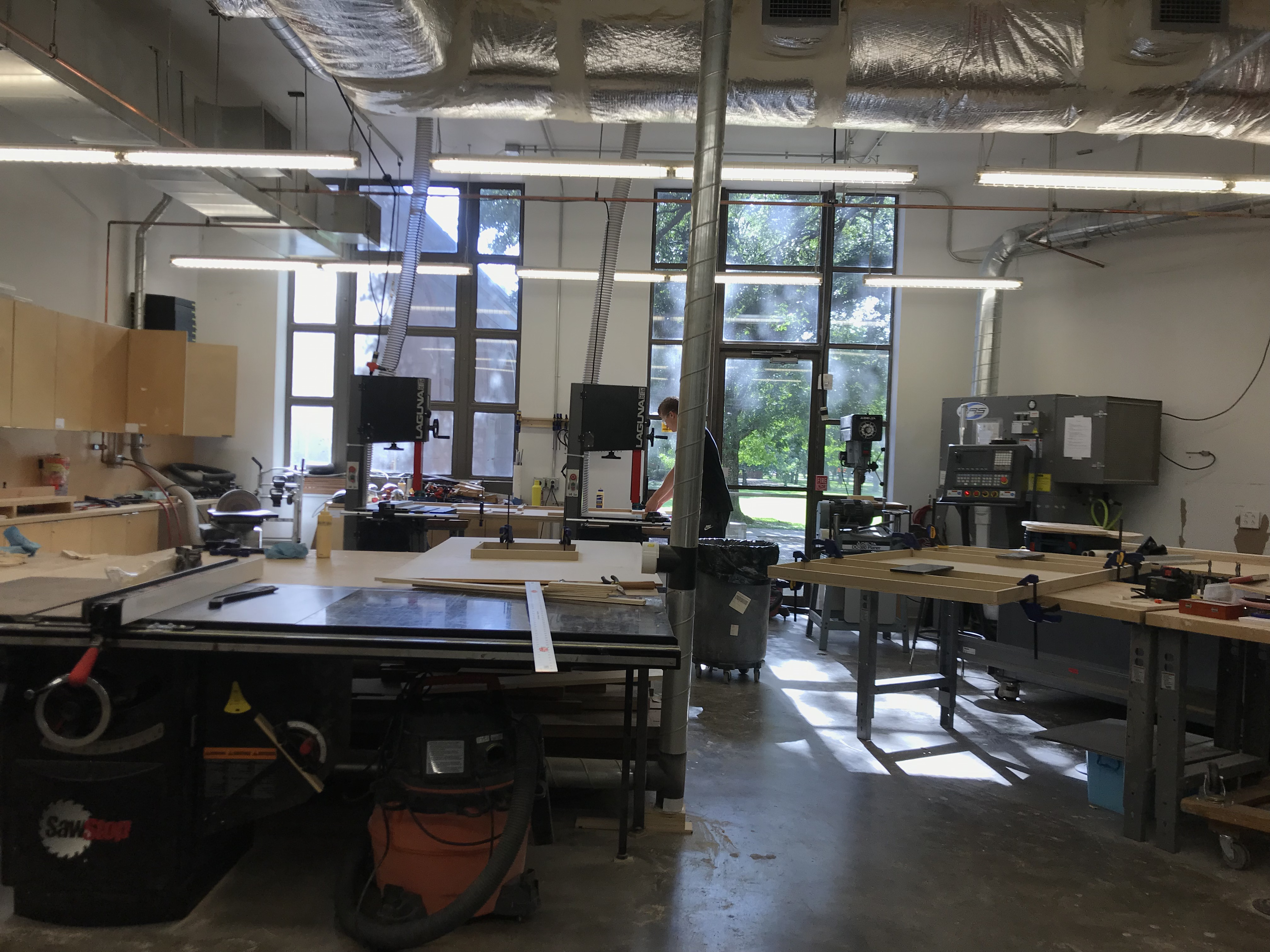
wood shop

Outside of Anderson Hall, there are a few related resources on campus. The Brown Art and Architecture Library is housed on the third floor of Fondren Library. Within the library, students have access to the photo studios and equipment rentals at DMC (digital media commons) and the GIS lab. Students also have access to resources at OEDK (Oshman Engineering Design Kitchen) of the Engineering school, as well as plotters in the Engineering building. The school also has limited access to the facilities of the Moody Center of the Arts. Public lectures are often held at off-campus locations such as the Museum of Fine Arts, Houston.

== Student organizations ==
=== Society ===
Society is the umbrella organization of all architecture students at the school. The group facilitates communication with the school administration, organizes the student body and hosts social and professional events.

==== Mentorship ====
Mentorship is Society’s branch for professional development opportunities, and organizes lectures, workshops, office visits and externships. Recess, a community outreach program that is currently within Mentorship, engages local public schools to teach elementary and secondary students about architecture and design thinking.

==== AGSA ====
Architecture Graduate Student Association (AGSA) organizes the graduate student body at the university level and within Society.

=== PLAT ===
PLAT is the student-run architecture journal at Rice Architecture. Each year, PLAT produces two issues: a .0 issue with a set theme in print, and a .5 issue in response that takes on different formats. In 2019, PLAT was awarded by the Graham Foundation and received an Honorable Mention for the Douglas Haskell Award for Student Journals through the AIA New York Center for Architecture.

=== Tête-à-Tête ===
Tête-à-Tête is the student-produced podcast series that features current practitioners, Rice faculty members, current students and alumni.

== Scholarships and Travel ==
=== Studio Travel and Travel Scholarships ===
Many studios at the school travel regularly at all levels. Totalization studios organize annual trips within the U.S., while graduate option studios and undergraduate junior studios often travel internationally. Recent studio travel destinations include Barcelona; Tokyo; Mexico City; Seoul; Marfa, TX; Los Angeles, CA; Washington, D.C.; and Columbus, IN. In 2020 and 2021 studio trips proposed for travel to Mumbai, Hong Kong, Singapore, and Buenos Aires were cancelled due to the COVID-19 pandemic. The studio trips are generally heavily subsidized by the school.

The global workshop program provides faculty-led workshops that occur during the summer for students to be able to travel abroad and study various topics. The programs in the summer of 2024 traveled to Barcelona, Singapore, and Mexico City and the programs for the summer of 2025 are going to Tokyo and Venice.

The school provides numerous travel fellowships, awarded to roughly 30 students each year—undergraduate and graduate—based on a written proposal that outlines a research ambition, itinerary, and budget.

== Rankings ==
In 2019, Rice’s undergraduate program was ranked 2nd in “most admired architecture undergraduate programs” by Designintelligence. The graduate program ranked 7th in “most admired” by the same organization.
