= Stephen Minot =

American novelist

Stephen Minot (May 27, 1927 – December 1, 2010) was an American novelist and short story author.

Born in Boston, Massachusetts, Minot graduated from Harvard College in 1951. He taught creative writing at several colleges, including Bowdoin College, Trinity College, and the University of California, Riverside.

His novels have been reviewed by many prominent publications, including the New York Times.

In addition to his fiction, he is the author of two textbooks, including Three Genres, the Writing of Poetry, Fiction, and Drama, which is often on creative writing curricula.

In 1966, Minot ran for the US Congress in Connecticut's 6th congressional district as a third-party candidate in opposition to the Vietnam War. He garnered 5,731 votes, or 3.4% of the vote.

== Bibliography ==
=== Novels ===
- Chill of Dusk (1964)
- Ghost Images (1979)
- Surviving the Flood (1981)

=== Short story collections ===
- Crossings, Stories by Stephen Minot (1975)
- Bending Time (1997)

=== Nonfiction ===
- Three Genres, the Writing of Poetry, Fiction, and Drama (1st edition 1965; 8th edition 2007)
- Three Stances of Modern Fiction (anthology edited with Robley Wilson, Jr., 1972)
- Reading Fiction (1984)
- Literary Nonfiction: The Fourth Genre (2002)
