= Jack Matthews (author) =

American novelist (1925–2013)

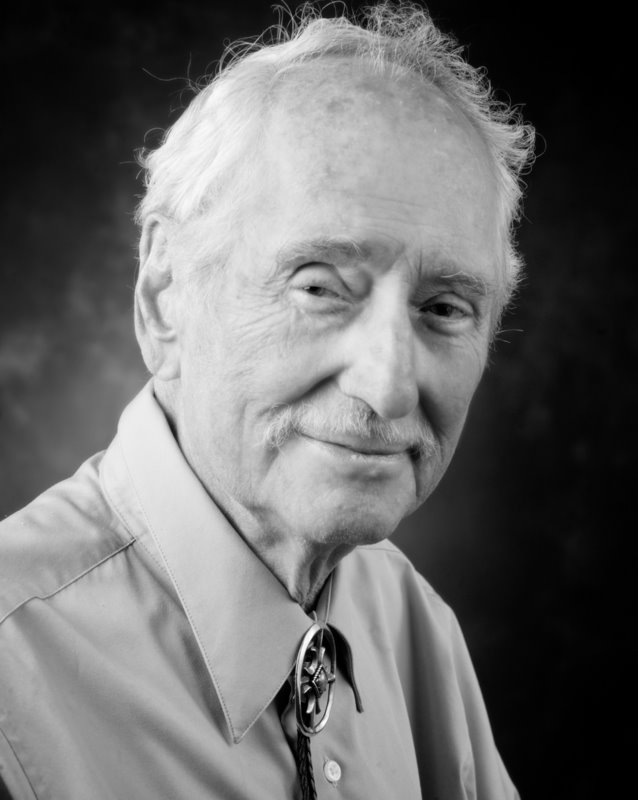
- Born: John Harold Matthews; July 22, 1925; Columbus, Ohio, U.S.
- Died: November 28, 2013 (aged 88)
- Education: Ohio State University (BA)
- Occupations: Short story writer; novelist; essayist
- Writing career
- Period: 1965–2013
- Genres: philosophical fiction, historical fiction
- Notable works: Hanger Stout Awake (novel), Sassafras (novel), Gambler's Nephew (Novel), Crazy Women (Short Stories)
- Website: ghostlypopulations.com

John Harold "Jack" Matthews (July 22, 1925 – November 28, 2013) was an American novelist, short story writer, essayist, playwright and former professor. He published 7 novels, 11 story collections, a novella, and 8 volumes of essays. He was an avid book collector, and many of his book finds served as a basis for his essays and the historical topics he explored in his fiction. His 1972 novel The Charisma Campaigns was nominated by Walker Percy for the National Book Award. He has often made 19th century America and the Civil War period the setting for his fiction, starting with his 1981 novel Sassafras and most recently with the 2011 novel Gambler's Nephew (which tells the story of how an abolitionist accidentally kills an escaped slave) and a 2015 story collection Soldier Boys: Tales of the Civil War. His plays have been performed at multiple theaters around the country.

== Life ==
Jack Matthews (born John Harold Matthews) was born in Columbus, Ohio in 1925. According to a 2009 interview, Matthews "had a wonderful childhood and didn’t know there was a Depression. My father was an attorney, born on a farm in Gallia County, Ohio, who studied law under a country judge, passed the bar and eventually had his own law firm in Columbus." He served with the Coast Guard between 1943 and 1945, working as "a radioman on the Coast Guard Cutter Maclaine in the North Pacific, on anti-submarine patrol out of Sitka & Juneau. It was wonderful, for this was the very sea that Wolf Larsen (a character from the [Sea-Wolf]) sailed in." According to a biographical profile written by critic Stanley Lindberg, Matthews studied at the Ohio State University in Columbus between 1945-9 and 1952-4 where he received a B.A. in classics and English in 1949; in 1954 he received his M.A. in English from the same university. After college, Matthews worked at various jobs that “gave me an excuse to knock on doors.” That included selling things door to door as a Fuller Brush Man and selling encyclopedias. For a short time he worked as a private detective and later as a produce warehouseman. While he and wife were raising two daughters, he worked 9 years with the Post Office on afternoons and nights; that gave him time to write and attend graduate classes in the morning. During the 1950s he worked as a post office clerk, and from 1959, he started teaching at various colleges. He was associate professor, 1959–62, and professor of English, 1962–64, Urbana College, Ohio; associate professor, 1964–70, Distinguished Writer-in-Residence, Wichita State University, Kansas, 1970–71. From 1971 to 1977, he was professor of English and since 1978 Distinguished Professor, Ohio University, Athens.

Matthews was married for over 60 years to his wife Barbara, he had three children. His daughter Barbiel Matthews-Saunders did cover and artwork for many of his fiction titles — including all of his later ebooks.

Matthews died on November 28, 2013, at his home in Athens, Ohio.

== Later publications ==
After teaching creative writing and critical approaches to fiction and drama over a period of four decades at Ohio University, Matthews retired, taught writing classes part-time, and devoted his energies to writing novels and stories. In 2011, he published A Worker's Writebook (a 75,000 word fiction writing guide which he handed out to his students) and Gambler's Nephew (an historically accurate story about how an accidental killing of a slave in 19th century United States affected various families and communities). Claire Blechman, reviewing the book for Ploughshares said, "For a story focused on morality and rife with violence, The Gambler’s Nephew is surprisingly light-hearted. Many contemporary authors try to make you writhe under the weight of heavy philosophical issues, but Matthews would rather you shake your head and give a small smile."

In March 2012, an early work, Hanger Stout, Awake!, was republished as an ebook. According to the ebook publisher's information, "Time Magazine described it as a 'gentle first novel told with a fine ear for adolescent patois,' and National Book Award winning poet William Stafford named this book as one of the most neglected works of the 20th century. Southern novelist Eudora Welty said about the book: 'I like it, and warmly admire his sturdy subject and delicately restrained treatment. It seemed to me blessed with honesty, clarity, directness, proportion and a lovely humor. . . .' The novella tells the story of Clyde Stout, a high school graduate in a small Ohio town who discovers he has a new talent: the ability to hang from a metal bar longer than anybody.

In Spring 2013, Personville Press published an audio performance of Interview with the Sphinx and an ebook version of the script. The ebook of the script contained a slightly revised version of the original 1992 script (which is one act) and an expanded 2012 version (which is two acts). According to the play's introduction (reprinted on the author's site), the original script called for two characters (the Interviewer and the Sphinx) while the expanded version calls for two additional characters (Sigmund Freud and Florence Nightingale) who serve as a kind of Greek chorus. In a video interview, Matthews said he got the original idea for the play after writing an article in the 1960s for the CEA Critic arguing that Oedipus did not actually solve the riddle of the Sphinx. He said in the video, "The play itself isn't exactly about that; it's about the Sphinx herself as a kind of force of nature, as a demonic character and as an utterly fascinating woman."

The author's website announced in early 2013 that Personville Press would be publishing four new short story collections by Matthews. The last short story collection was published in 1993. The first collection (titled Soldier Boys and published in April 2016) "depicts how ordinary Civil War soldiers deal with the rigors of war and have to confront life-and-death questions". According to the book's preface, "Soldier Boys operates on a more metaphysical level – beyond the Civil War or even war itself. These stories come from the head of a retired author in his 70s who had already been writing stories most of his life." The second collection of flash fiction (titled Abruptions: 3 Minute Tales to Awaken the Mind) was published in October, 2017. Matthews wrote stories for this volume during his last decade of life and published several of the "abruptions" under the pseudonym Matt Hughes. According to Personville Press (the book's publisher), these abruptions (or "very short stories that end abruptly") are "poetic and fable-like tales about quirky people from small towns -- told with simple language, flashes of humor and a sage's sense of wonder and irony". The third collection, Second Death of Edgar Allan Poe and other Stories contained "down-to-earth yarns: gently satirical and reminiscent of John Cheever’s fiction. Most are like pleasant strolls through Midwestern neighborhoods, glimpsing random people at backyard parties, cafes and parking lots." The fourth collection, Boxes of Time was published in January 2024. It consists of realistic stories published between 1965 and 1980; they deal with "messy emotions, troubled families and damaged personalities."

In June 2015, Nine Point Publishing announced the publication of another novel, Schopenhauer's Will, which for a long time could not find a publisher in the US but was first translated into Czech and published in Europe by H & H Press. In a 2009 interview, Matthews said "the book is somewhat freakish — not exactly fiction, biography or philosophy, but a mélange of all of these (with a one-act play thrown in)." The publisher describes the book's tone as "ironic, frolicsome and light-hearted, designed to serve in counterpoint to the familiar stereotype of Schopenhauer as a relentlessly grim pessimist."

== Awards ==
- Florence Roberts Head award, 1968
- Quill award (Massachusetts Review, Amherst), 1967;
- Guggenheim Fellowship, 1974
- Ohio Arts Council Grants (including a $50,000 Major Artist Award for 1989–90)
- Ohio University Research Foundation Grants
- Stories in The Best American Short Stories [various years], Prize Stories: The O. Henry Awards [various years], and other anthologies
- Nomination for the NBA Fiction Award in 1972 for The Charisma Campaigns
- Honorary Paul Harris Fellowship Award in 2013 awarded for service to Athens Rotary Club

== Works ==
=== Fiction/poetry/plays ===
- Boxes of Time: Stories. Personville Press,(January 2024). Realistic stories, mostly published between 1965 and 1980.
- Second Death of E.A. Poe and other stories. Personville Press,(2021). 2 historical novellas + contemporary stories. "Down-earth yarns" which are "gently satirical."
- Abruptions (flash fiction). Personville Press,(2017). Ebook. Poetic and fable-like tales about quirky people from small towns.
- Soldier Boys: Tales of the Civil War (short stories). Personville Press,(2016). Ebook. Philosophical short fiction with a Civil War theme.
- Three Times Time (short stories). Personville Press,(2012). Free promotional ebook consisting of 3 previously published stories.
- Gambler's Nephew (novel). Etruscan Press,(2011).
- Interview with the Sphinx (play). (ebook, 2013, based on an earlier 1993 edition). Houston, TX: 2013. Includes both the 1-act version and the enhanced 2-act version.
- Interview with the Sphinx (1-act play). (audio performance, 2013). Houston, TX: 2013. Performed by actors Neal Gage and Jill Brumer and produced by Personville Press.
- Storyhood as We Know It and Other Tales (stories). Johns Hopkins University Press,(1993).
- Moonless Place, a Novella by Jack Matthews. From Human Anatomy: Three Fictions (An anthology of novellas by 3 authors). Bottom Dog Press, (1993).
- Interview with a Sphinx(play). Dramatic Publishing Company,(1992).
- Dirty Tricks (stories). Baltimore, Johns Hopkins University Press, (1990).
- Ghostly Populations (stories). Baltimore, Johns Hopkins University Press,(1987).
- Crazy Women (stories). Baltimore, Johns Hopkins University Press (1985).
- Sassafras (novel). Boston, Houghton Mifflin, (1983).
- Dubious Persuasions (stories). Baltimore, Johns Hopkins University Press,(1981).
- Tales of the Ohio Land (stories). Columbus, Ohio Historical Society, (1978).
- Pictures of the Journey Back (novel). New York, Harcourt Brace, (1973).
- The Charisma Campaigns (novel). New York, Harcourt Brace, (1972).
- The Tale of Asa Bean (novel). New York, Harcourt Brace, (1971).
- Beyond the Bridge (novel). New York, Harcourt Brace,(1970).
- In a Theater of Buildings (poetry). Marshall, Minnesota, Ox Head Press,(1970).
- "The Hotel". Massachusetts Review (1967).
- Hanger Stout, Awake!. New York, Harcourt Brace, (1967)(republished as an ebook by Personville Press in March 2012).
- An Almanac for Twilight (poetry). Chapel Hill, University of North Carolina Press, (1966).
- Bitter Knowledge(stories). New York, Scribner, (1964).

=== Non-fiction ===
- Schopenhauer's Will: Das Testament (creative biography -- mixed genre). Nine Point Publishing,(2015).
- A Worker’s Writebook, (how-to book on writing). Ebook, Personville Press(2011).
- Reading Matter: Rhetorical Muses of a Rabid Bibliophile. New Castle, Delaware, Oak Knoll Press, (2000).
- Booking Pleasures. Athens, Ohio University Press, (1996).
- Rare Book Lore: Selections from the Letters of Ernest J. Wessen. (Edited by Jack Matthews), Athens, Ohio University Press, (1992).
- Memoirs of a Bookman. Athens, Ohio University Press, (1990).
- Booking in the Heartland. Baltimore, Johns Hopkins University Press, (1986).
- Collecting Rare Books for Pleasure and Profit. New York, Putnam, (1977).
- Archetypal Themes in the Modern Story (anthology). Edited by Jack Matthews. New York, St. Martin's Press, (1973).
- The Writer’s Signature: Idea in Story and Essay. Editor, with Elaine Gottlieb Hemley. Chicago, Scott Foresman, (1972).
