= Ward Just =

American writer (1935–2019)

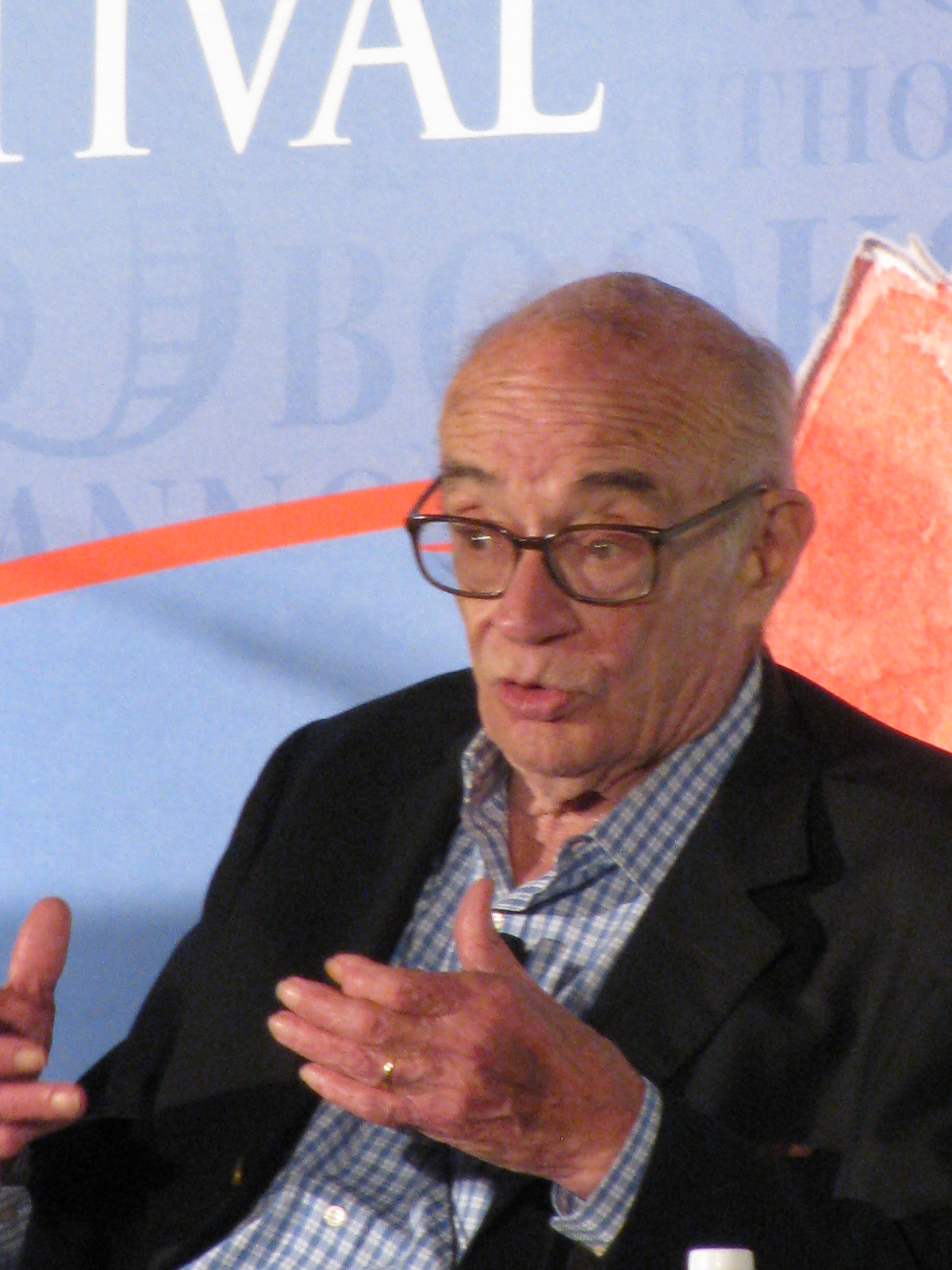
- Born: Ward Swift Just; September 5, 1935; Michigan City, Indiana, U.S.
- Died: December 19, 2019 (aged 84); Plymouth, Massachusetts, U.S.
- Education: Trinity College
- Writing career
- Genre: fiction
- Notable awards: American Academy of Arts and Letters

Ward Swift Just (September 5, 1935 – December 19, 2019) was an American writer. He was a war correspondent and the author of 19 novels and numerous short stories.

== Biography ==
Just was born in Michigan City, Indiana, attended Lake Forest Academy, and subsequently graduated from the Kingswood School (today Cranbrook Kingswood School) in 1953. He briefly attended Trinity College in Hartford, Connecticut. He started his career as a print journalist for the Waukegan (Illinois) News-Sun. He married three times and had three children. His daughter, Julia Just, was the Children's Book Editor for the New York Times Book Review from 2005 to 2010.

Just died of complications from Lewy body dementia in Plymouth, Massachusetts, on December 19, 2019. He was 84 years old.

== War correspondent ==
Just covered the war in Cyprus (1957) and the conflict in the Dominican Republic for Newsweek. Then Benjamin Bradlee hired Just at The Washington Post as a war correspondent for the Vietnam war. He published close to 400 articles, many appearing on the front page.

He met journalist Frances Fitzgerald at a party soon after her arrival in Saigon in early 1966 and began a relationship with her that continued until she left South Vietnam in November 1966.

He was wounded on 8 June 1966 covering Operation Hawthorne, but returned to Saigon for a second tour after recovering in Washington, D.C. Leaving Saigon in May 1967, he wrote "To What End: Report from Vietnam," credited as being an important element in helping the nation understand the futility of that war. He went on to cover the presidential campaigns of both Eugene McCarthy and Richard Nixon for the Post in 1968 and was then asked to join its editorial board.

== Fiction writing ==
Just's influences included Henry James and Ernest Hemingway. His novel An Unfinished Season was a finalist for the Pulitzer Prize for Fiction in 2005. His novel Echo House was a finalist for the National Book Award in 1997. He was twice a finalist for the O. Henry Award, in 1985 for his short story About Boston, and again in 1986 for his short story The Costa Brava, 1959. He was Spring 1999 Rome Prize fellow.

His fiction is often concerned with the influence of national politics on Americans' personal lives. Much of it is set in Washington, D.C., and foreign countries. Another common theme is the alienation felt by Midwesterners in the East.

According to Washington Post book critic Jonathan Yardley, Just's finest novels are A Family Trust, An Unfinished Season, Exiles in the Garden, and American Romantic. He also lists Just's short story collection, The Congressman Who Loved Flaubert, as one of his favorite books. Yardley recently wrote that "American Romantic may well be the best of them all."

In a column at Literary Hub in 2018, Susan Zakin wrote that "Ward Just is not merely America’s best political novelist. He is America’s greatest living novelist. To our discredit, he’s also America’s Greatest Unknown Novelist."

In May 2013, The American Academy of Arts and Letters at its annual induction and award ceremony inducted Ward Just as a new member of the academy and honored his lifetime achievement in the field of Literature, along with an exhibition of his manuscripts.

== Works ==
=== Novels ===
- A Soldier of the Revolution (1970)
- Stringer (1974)
- Nicholson at Large (1975)
- A Family Trust (1978)
- In the City of Fear (1982)
- The American Blues (1984)
- The American Ambassador (1987)
- Jack Gance (1989)
- The Translator (1991)
- Ambition & Love (1994)
- Echo House (1997)
- A Dangerous Friend (1999)
- The Weather in Berlin (2002)
- An Unfinished Season (2004)
- Forgetfulness (2006)
- Exiles In The Garden (2009)
- Rodin's Debutante (2011)
- American Romantic (2014)
- The Eastern Shore (2016)

=== Story collections ===
- The Congressman Who Loved Flaubert (1973)
- Honor, Power, Riches, Fame, and the Love of Women (1979)
- Twenty-one: Selected Stories (1990)
- Lowell Limpett and Two Stories (2001)

=== Nonfiction ===
- To What End (1968)
- Military Men (1970)

=== Plays ===
- Lowell Limpett (2001)

=== Anthologized in ===
- Reporting Vietnam: American Journalism 1959–1969 (Part One) (1998)
