= Notre Dame High School (San Jose, California) =

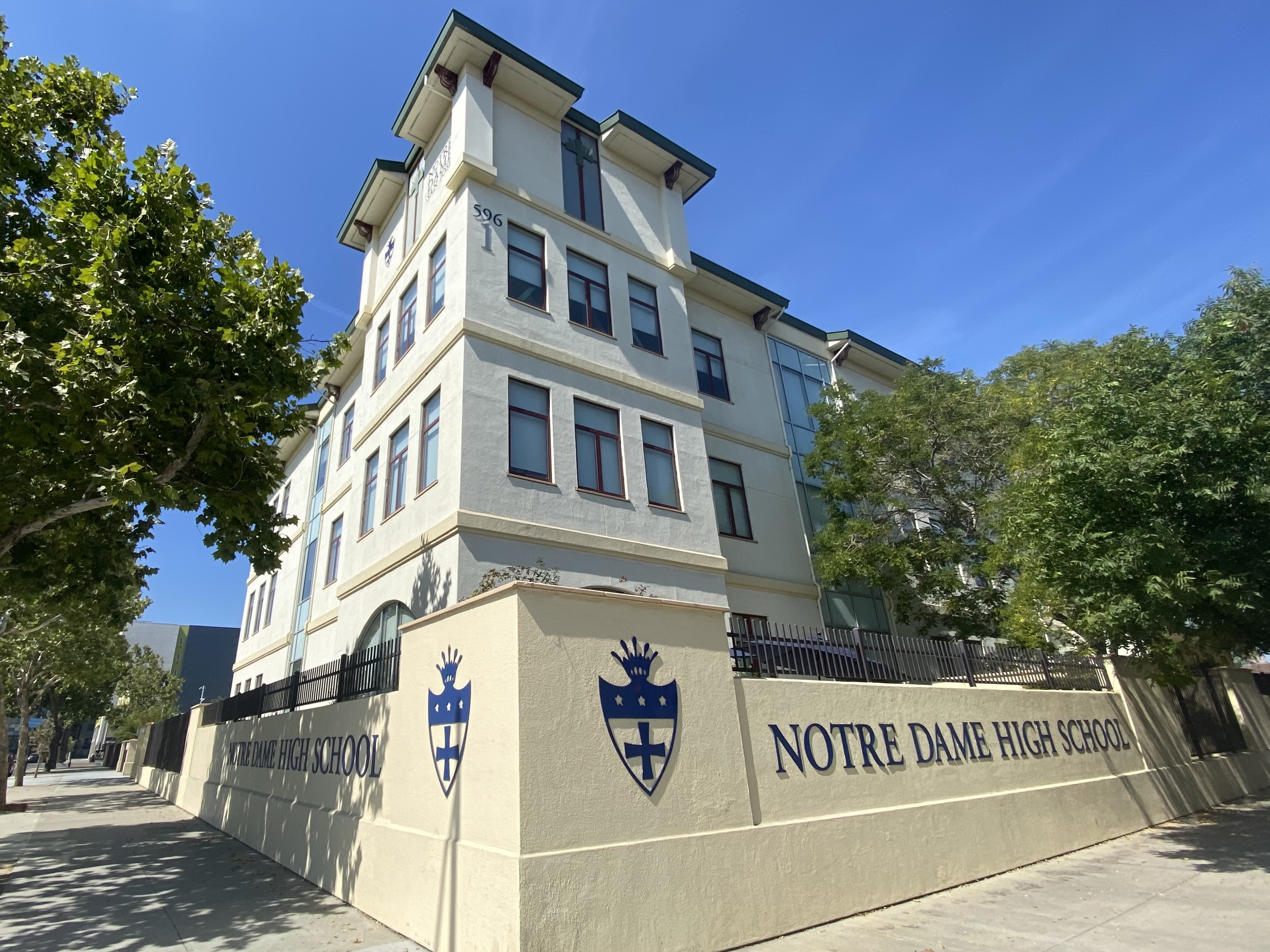

Location
- 596 South 2nd Street; San Jose, (Santa Clara County), California 95112; United States; 37°19′42″N 121°52′57″W

Information
- Type: Private, All-Female
- Motto: "Teach them what they need to know for life."
- Religious affiliation: Roman Catholic
- Established: 1851; 175 years ago
- Founder: Sisters of Notre Dame de Namur
- Sister school: Bellarmine College Preparatory, Presentation High School
- Principal: Ashley Rae Mathis
- Grades: 9-12
- Average class size: 23
- Colors: Navy Blue and White
- Song: Ora et Labora
- Mascot: Regent
- Accreditation: Western Catholic Educational Association
- Newspaper: Crown and Shield
- Tuition: US$20,220 (2020–2021)
- Website: http://www.ndsj.org

Notre Dame High School is a Catholic college preparatory high school for girls in San Jose, California. Founded in 1851, Notre Dame is the oldest high school in California (tied with Bellarmine College Preparatory).

== History ==
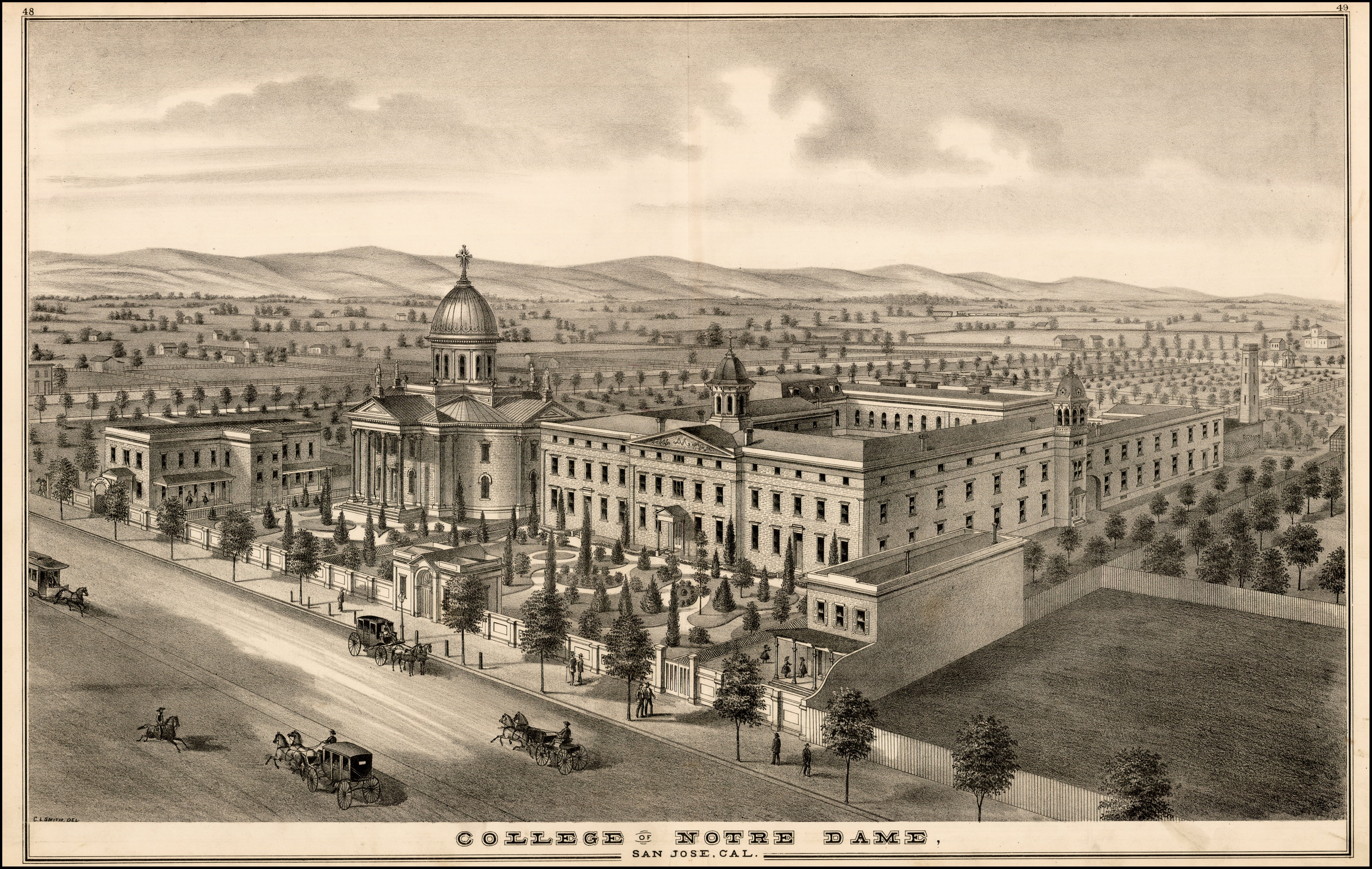
Notre Dame in 1851.

Notre Dame is an all-girls Catholic high school situated in downtown San Jose. The school was founded as the College of Notre Dame by the Catholic Sisters of Notre Dame de Namur. The Sisters of Notre Dame also ran St Joseph's (now the site of Adobe's HQs), St Leo's, St. Clare's, St Francis Xavier and St Mary's where many of the female students later came to Notre Dame High School and Notre Dame de Namur College.

On August 4, 1851 the Women's College of Notre Dame and convent opened on ten acres of land at 1 Notre Dame Avenue and Santa Clara Street. Notre Dame was the sister school to the all Men's Santa Clara College located two and a half miles away West on The Alameda, San Jose.

In 1868, it became California's first chartered women's college authorized to grant the baccalaureate degree to women. In 1900 the Conservatory of Music was built.

In May 1901 US President McKinley visited the school and was presented rosebuds by the students.

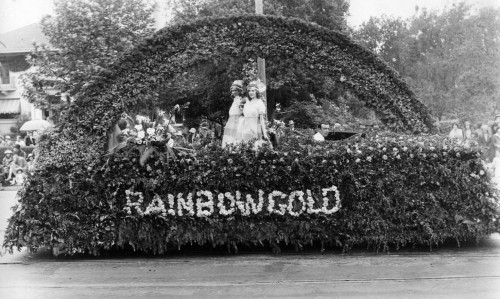
The class of 1929's float at the annual Fiesta de las Rosas in Downtown San Jose.

In 1923 the College of Notre Dame, high school and elementary school moved: to the Ralston estate, located in Belmont on the San Francisco Peninsula while part of the high school (Santa Clara Street Academy) moved to the O'Connor Mansion at Second and Reed Street in San Jose. The O'Connor Mansion, was donated in 1898 to the Sisters of Notre Dame de Namur by Judge Myles P. O'Connor and his wife, Amanda.

In 1958, the construction of two buildings began. Julie Billiart Hall served the purpose of a gathering place for school functions, a gym, and a cafeteria. Madonna Hall, later renamed Donnelly Hall in honor of Sister Mary Emmanuel Donnelly, is a two-story building that contains classrooms, teacher offices, and now a fully functional computer lab.

In 1965, a convent and chapel complex was built on the northeast corner of the campus (South 3rd St & East William St). It has a traditional Spanish architecture and central courtyard designed by architect Warren Gilbert. Today it has two stories and is referred to as the 'Student Life Center.' The first story houses two art classrooms, a garden, a religious studies classroom, counseling offices and various teacher and staff. The second story is home to the business office.

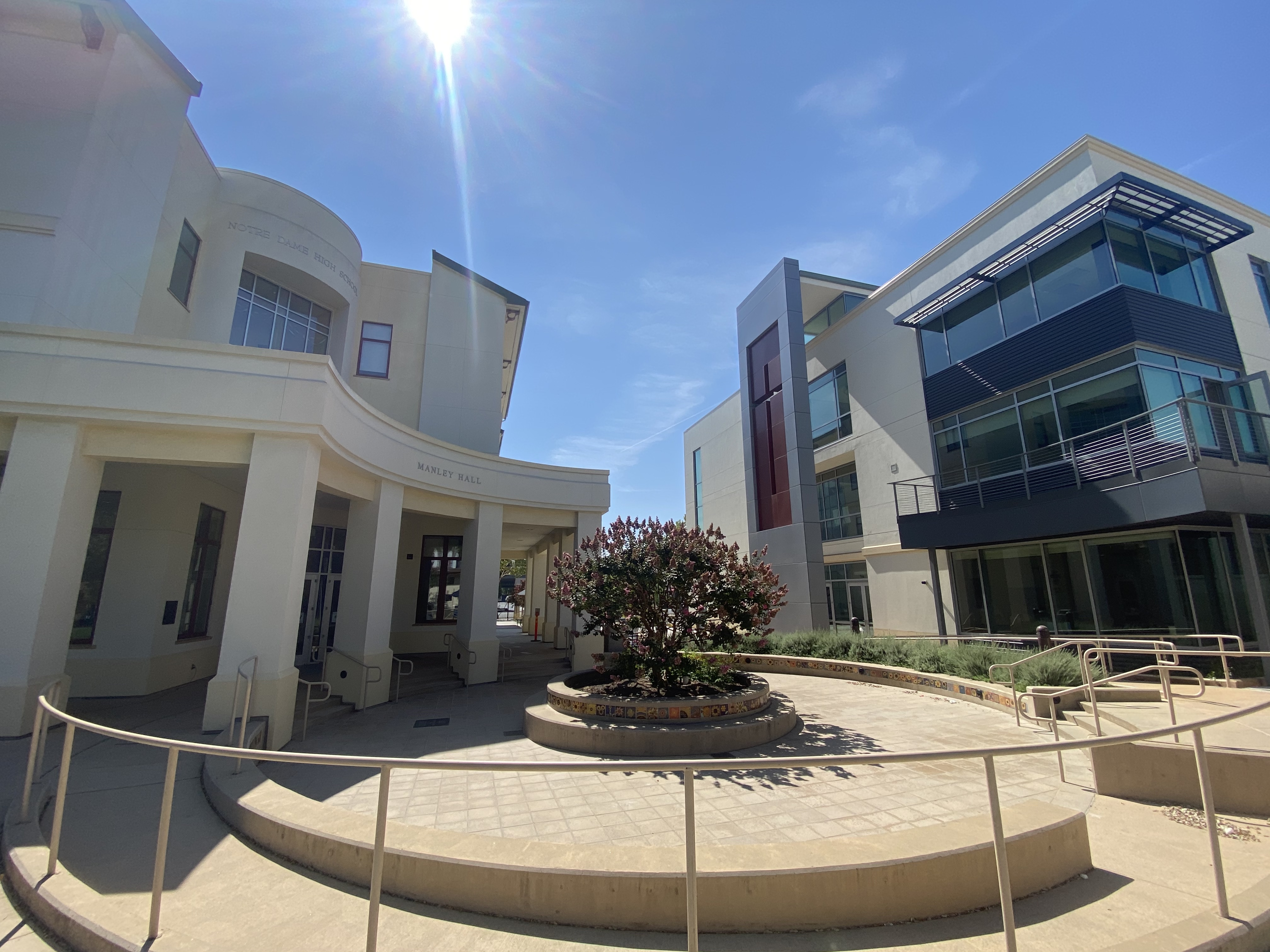
Manley Hall (left) was built in 2002 and the Center for Women's Leadership (right) was built 2021.

On September 9, 2002, Manley Hall, a three-story building designed by Anderson-Brulé Architects replaced the O'Connor Mansion. The building, though modern in design and use, still conveys an air of age and history, as was the intent of the architects. To add to this feeling was the inclusion of the fireplaces and artifacts saved from the O'Connor Mansion, the more noticeable being the fireplace located in the library and the glass doors (though one is a replica) of the Alumnae Room. All of the floors of this building are decorated with the class photos from the school, the earliest dating before the 1890s.

In 2016, a major renovation of the campus was announced. The expansion of the campus now includes the entire city block bounded by East William, South 2nd street, East Reed and South 3rd street. It would involve the removal of six older campus buildings and the addition of four multi story buildings. It is currently going through city permit approval.

== School symbols ==
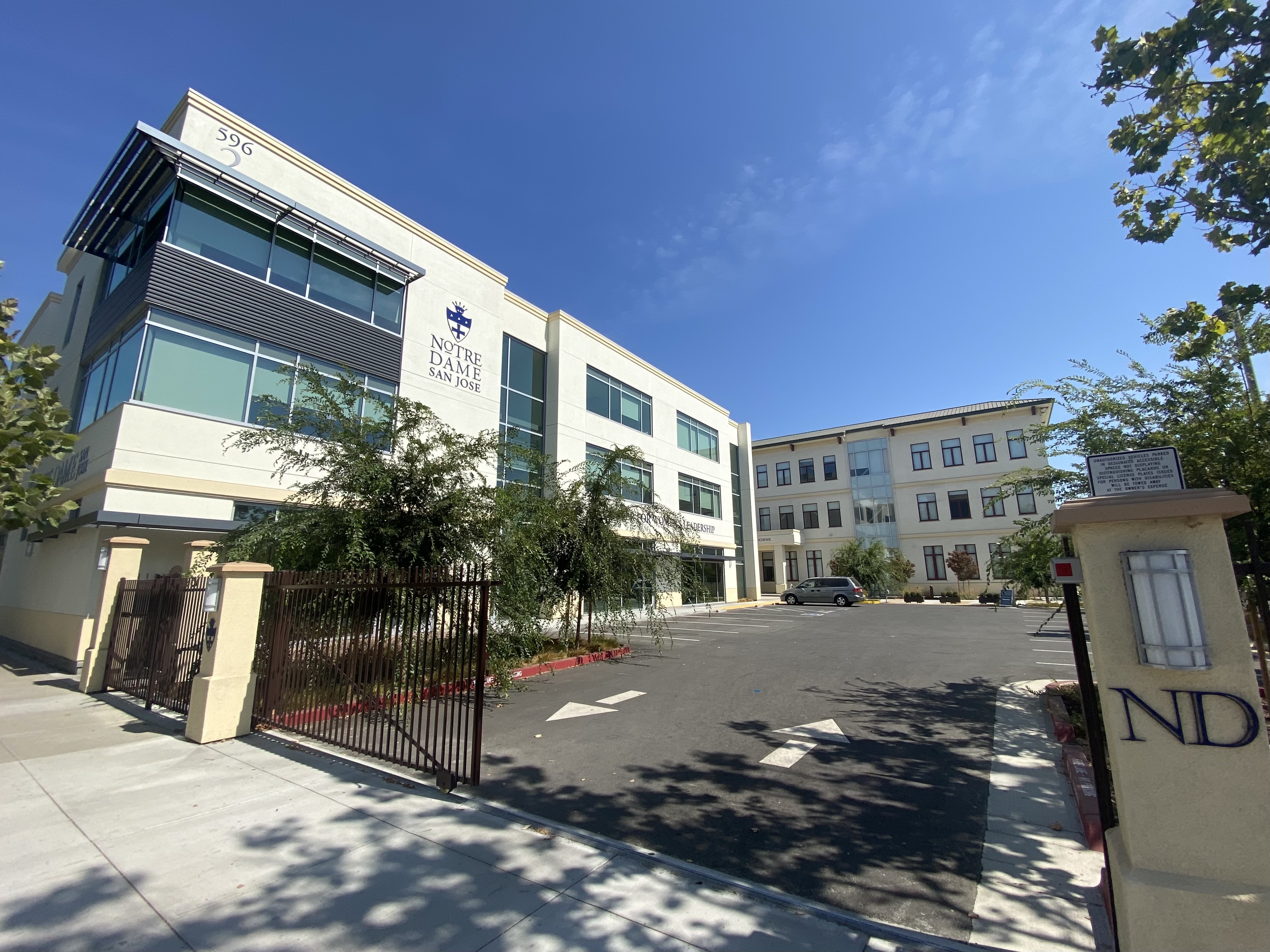
Entrance on 2nd Street.

Notre Dame's crest is the coat of arms of the Sisters of Notre Dame de Namur.

The school's original mascot, the Gremlin, was replaced in 2000 during the 150th anniversary of the school's founding. The new mascot, the Regent, expresses the students' abilities for growing, moving on, and facing new challenges.

In addition, each year the freshman class chooses their own class mascot and colors.

== Extracurriculars ==
Notre Dame High School of San Jose (NDSJ) provides a wide variety of activities outside of classes, including numerous clubs, sports, and interaction with the San Jose community. Clubs can range from different cultures (i.e. Filipino Student Association, Latinas Unidas, Vietnamese Student Association) to hobbies (i.e. Culinary, Art, Film Fest) to helping students reach their goals in the future (i.e. Math Team, California Scholarship Federation).

== Admissions ==
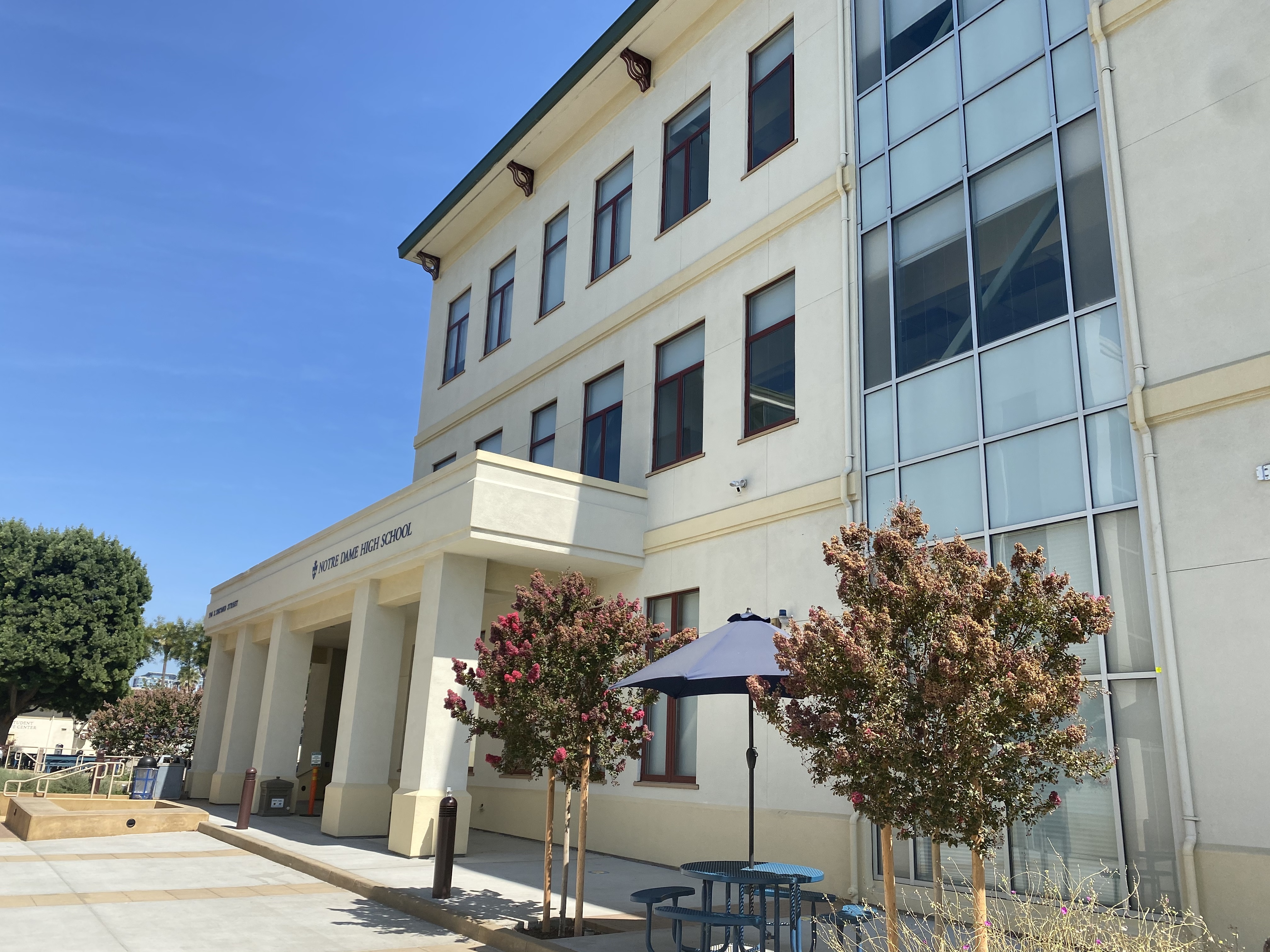
Manley Hall.

Notre Dame San Jose admits around 170 young women each year. Many students come from the Catholic middle schools and other private schools in the region. The school holds an open house each October for families to visit.

They offer Seventh graders a "preview afternoon" in April where they can more about the school. Seventh grade catholic school students can join Notre Dame's LEADS program (Learn, Empower, Act, Discover).

The school requires a High School Placement Test (HSPT) and a completed application form to be considered for admission.

== Women of Impact ==
Notre Dame honors women leaders making significant contributions to their fields and society annually at its "Women of Impact" event. Past honorees have included: LaDoris Cordell (Superior Court of California judge), Aparna Bawa (COO of Zoom), Kim Rivera (CLO of Hewlett-Packard), and Kelly Powell Bruno (CEO of the National Health Foundation),

== Notable alumnae ==
- Angela Dimayuga - American executive chef and cultural advocate
- Maude Campbell-Jansen - Californian composer
- Michelle Do - American competitor at the 2000 Olympics.
- Miroslava Chavez-Garcia - Professor at University of California, Santa Barbara
- Linda Park - South Korean actress in Star Trek: Enterprise
- Fatima Farheen Mirza - New York Times best selling author of A Place for Us
