= John Blair =

John Blair may refer to:

== Politics ==
- John Blair Sr. (c.1687–1771), American merchant and politician in the colony of Virginia
- John Blair Jr. (1732–1800), American politician, Founding Father and jurist
- John Blair (Tennessee politician) (1790–1863), American politician
- John Blair (Northern Ireland politician) (born 1966), Member of the Legislative Assembly for South Antrim
- John Knox Blair (1873–1950), Canadian politician, physician and teacher
- John Rutherfurd Blair (1843–1914), New Zealand politician

== Sports ==
- John Blair (1890s footballer), Scottish footballer active 1894–1899
- John Blair (footballer, born 1898) (1898–1971), Scottish footballer (Partick Thistle)
- John Blair (English footballer) (1898–1974), top scorer in the 1923–24 Oldham Athletic A.F.C. season
- John Blair (footballer, born 1905) (1905–1974), Scottish footballer (Third Lanark, Tottenham Hotspur, Sheffield United)
- John Blair (footballer, born 1910) (1910–1975), Scottish footballer (Motherwell and Scotland)
- John Blair (Australian footballer) (born 1955), Australian rules footballer
- John Blair (rugby union) (c. 1871–1911), New Zealand rugby union player

== Other ==
- John Blair (historian) (born 1955), British historian, archaeologist, and academic
- John Blair (pastor) (1720–1771), Presbyterian minister
- John Blair (priest) (died 1782), British clergyman and chronologist
- John Blair (writer) (born 1961), American poet, novelist, and short-story writer
- John Blair (musician), American violinist on the 1973 album Song of the New World
- John Blair (painter) (1849–1934), Scottish painter
- John Blair (surgeon) (1928–2023), Scottish surgeon
- John Hamilton Blair (1889–1972), Scottish mariner
- John Hunter Blair (1903–1964), British television producer
- John Insley Blair (1802–1899), American entrepreneur, railroad magnate, and philanthropist
- John Leo Blair (1888–1962), American businessman
- John T. Blair (1885–1976), American architect and builder

== See also ==
- John Hamilton of Blair (c. 1638–1690), 17th-century Scottish bishop
- John Insley Blair Larned (1881–1955), American Episcopal bishop
- Jon Blair (born 1950), South African-born writer and filmmaker
- Jon Blair Hunter, American politician active 1996–2008
