= MacLafferty =

MacLafferty is a surname. Notable people with the surname include:

- James H. MacLafferty (1871–1937), U.S. Representative from California
- Fred McLafferty (1923–2021), American chemist known for his work in mass spectrometry

== See also ==
- McClafferty
