= Year and a day =

Year and a day can refer to:

- The year and a day rule, a period tied into various legal principles in a number of jurisdictions
- A Year and a Day (1998 novel), by Virginia Henley
- A Year and a Day (2004 novel), by Leslie Pietrzyk (pub. William Morrow)
- A Year and a Day (2006 novel), by Sara M. Harvey
- A poem by Elizabeth Siddal
- "Year and a Day", a song by the Beastie Boys
- A Year and a Day, a 2005 film
- One Year and One Day, a 2025 Spanish film
- A period used in handfastings – though more from the works of Sir Walter Scott than history
- The time The Owl and the Pussycat sailed for in Edward Lear's poem of that name.
- Long term assets are considered to be those held for a year and a day.
- Pagans and secret societies often use a year and a day as a minimum period of initiation or between degrees of membership.
- A Year and a Day, a 2008 mixtape by rapper T.I.

Note: In leap years, 366 days would be considered a full year.
