= Jonathan Blum =

Jonathan Blum may refer to:

- Jonathan Blum (writer, born 1972), American writer, known for Doctor Who
- Jonathan Blum (writer, born 1967), American writer
- Jonathon Blum (born 1989), American ice hockey player

== See also ==
- John Blum (born 1959), American ice hockey player
- John Morton Blum (1921–2011), American political historian
