= Rebecca Johns =

American novelist

- Born: 1971 (age 54–55)
- Education: Missouri School of Journalism; Iowa Writers' Workshop
- Occupations: Author; educator
- Website: www.rebeccajohns.com

Rebecca Johns (born 1971) is an American author and educator. She is a graduate of the University of Missouri's School of Journalism and the Iowa Writers' Workshop. She is the author of Icebergs and The Countess. Johns is a member of the DePaul University English Department and teaches annually at the Iowa Summer Writing Festival in Iowa City.

== Early career ==
Rebecca Johns grew up in northern Illinois and attended Antioch Community High School. She then attended the University of Missouri at Columbia, where she majored in Journalism and English (1993). Johns has written for several notable publications, including Mademoiselle, Woman's Day, Self, Cosmopolitan, the Chicago Tribune, Ladies' Home Journal, the Harvard Review, the Mississippi Review and Ploughshares.

== Novels ==
=== Icebergs ===
Johns is the author of Icebergs (2006) (ISBN 1582344981), which opens in Canada during World War II with a harrowing plane crash. Crewmember Walt Dunmore returns home, but his life and those of his family are forever altered by the damage the tragedy causes. Icebergs follows Walt and his family from Canada to the United States through multiple generations, with the past casting a shadow over their lives. Icebergs was a finalist for the 2007 Hemingway Foundation / PEN Award for first fiction and a recipient of the Michener-Copernicus Fellowship.

=== The Countess ===
The Countess is Johns's newest work (October 2010) (ISBN 0307588467). The novel follows the life of Elizabeth Báthory (Erzsebet Báthory), the "Blood Countess" who was one of the historical figures some believe inspired the fictional Dracula.
