= Drue Heinz Literature Prize =

Short fiction prize

The Drue Heinz Literature Prize is a major American literary award for short fiction in the English language.

This prize of the University of Pittsburgh Press in Pittsburgh, Pennsylvania, United States was initiated in 1981 by Drue Heinz and developed by Frederick A. Hetzel. It has recognized and supported writers of short fiction and made their work available to readers around the world.

The award is open to writers who have published a book-length collection of fiction or at least three short stories or novellas in commercial magazines or literary journals. Manuscripts are judged anonymously by nationally known writers; past judges have included Robert Penn Warren, Joyce Carol Oates, Raymond Carver, Margaret Atwood, Russell Banks, Michael Chabon, Frank Conroy, Richard Ford, John Edgar Wideman, Nadine Gordimer, and Rick Moody. The prize carries a cash award of $15,000 and publication by the University of Pittsburgh Press. The winner is announced in February of each year.

== Winners ==
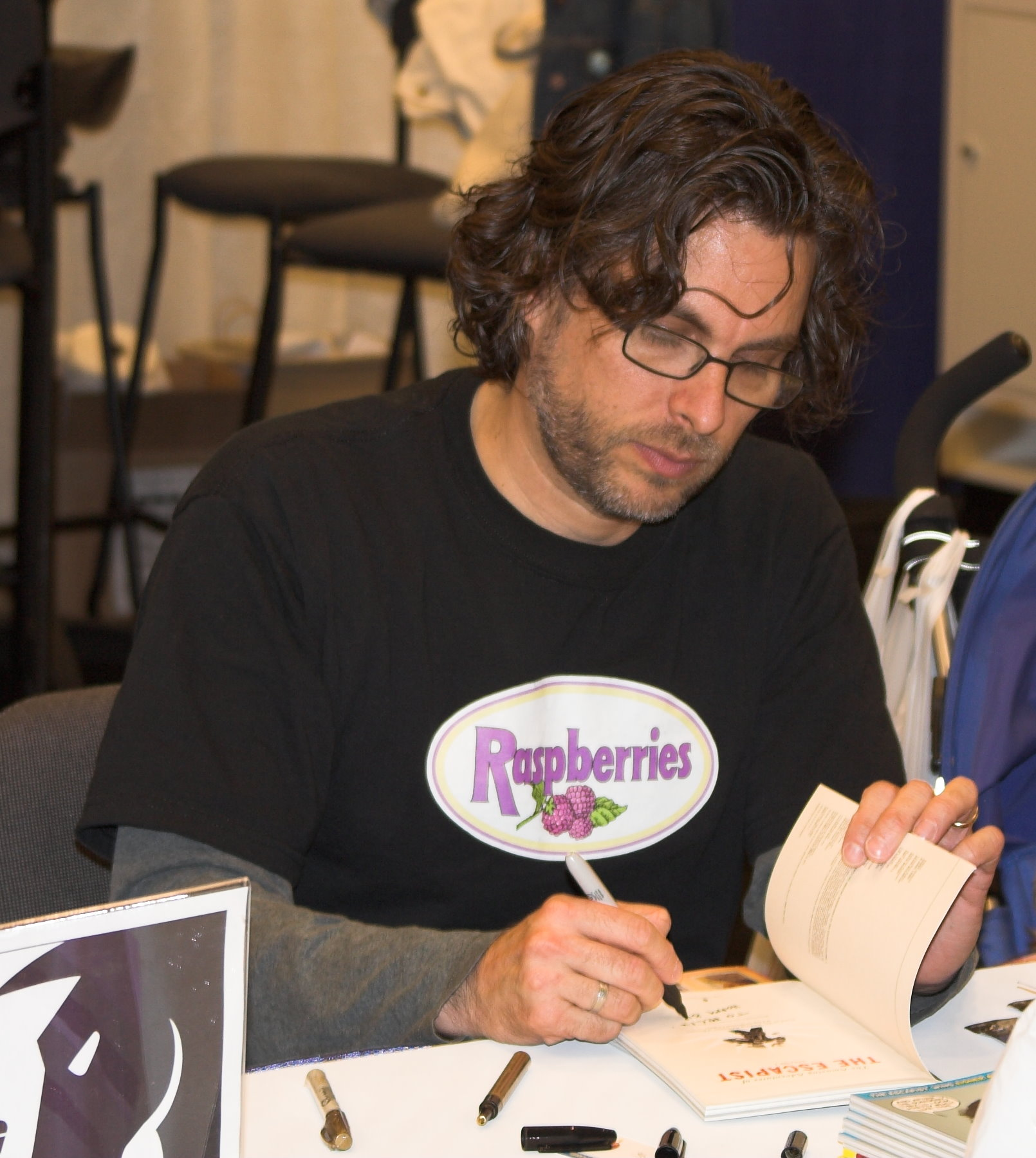
Pulitzer Prize winner and University of Pittsburgh alumnus Michael Chabon served as the senior judge in 2004.

Year	Winning Author	Title	Senior Judge
1981	David Bosworth	The Death of Descartes	Robert Penn Warren
1982	Robley Wilson	Dancing for Men	Raymond Carver
1983	Jonathan Penner	Private Parties	Wright Morris
1984	Randall Silvis	The Luckiest Man in the World	Joyce Carol Oates
1985	W. D. Wetherell	The Man Who Loved Levittown	Max Apple
1986	Rick DeMarinis	Under The Wheat	Alison Lurie
1987	Ellen Hunnicutt	In the Music Library	Nadine Gordimer
1988	Reginald McKnight	Moustapha's Eclipse	Margaret Atwood
1989	Maya Sonenberg	Cartographies	Robert Coover
1990	Rick Hillis	Limbo River	Russell Banks
1991	Elizabeth Graver	Have You Seen Me?	Richard Ford
1992	Jane McCafferty	Director of the World and Other Stories	John Edgar Wideman
1993	Stewart O'Nan	In The Walled City	Tobias Wolff
1994	Jennifer Cornell	Departures	Alice McDermott
1995	Geoffrey Becker	Dangerous Men	Charles Baxter
1996	Edith Pearlman	Vaquita and Other Stories	Rosellen Brown
1997	Katherine Vaz	Fado and Other Stories	George Garrett
1998	Barbara Croft	Necessary Fictions	Bharati Mukherjee
1999	Lucy Honig	The Truly Needy and Other Stories	Charles Johnson
2000	Adria Bernardi	In the Gathering Woods	Frank Conroy
2001	Brett Ellen Block	Destination Known	C. Michael Curtis
2002	John Blair	American Standard	Elizabeth Hardwick
2003	Suzanne Greenberg	Speed-Walk and Other Stories	Rick Moody
2004	Darrell Spencer	Bring Your Legs with You	Michael Chabon
2005	David Harris Ebenbach	Between Camelots	Stewart O'Nan
2006	Todd James Pierce	Newsworld	Joan Didion
2007	Kirk Nesset	Paradise Road	Hilary Masters
2008	Anthony Varallo	Out Loud	Scott Turow
2009	Anne Sanow	Triple Time	Ann Patchett
2010	Tina May Hall	The Physics of Imaginary Objects	Renata Adler
2011	Shannon Cain	The Necessity of Certain Behaviors	Alice Mattison
2012	Beth Bosworth	The Source of Life and Other Stories	Sven Birkerts
2013	Anthony Wallace	The Old Priest	Amy Hempel
2014	Kent Nelson	The Spirit Bird: Short Stories	David Guterson
2015	Leslie Pietrzyk	The Angel on My Chest	Jill McCorkle
2016	Melissa Yancy	Dog Years	Richard Russo
2017	William Wall	The Islands	David Gates
2018	Brad Felver	The Dogs of Detroit	Lynne Sharon Schwartz
2019	Kate Wisel	Driving in Cars with Homeless Men	Min Jin Lee
2020	Caroline Kim	The Prince of Mournful Thoughts and Other Stories	Alexander Chee
2021	Joanna Pearson	Now You Know It All	Edward P. Jones
2022	Ramona Reeves	It Falls Gently All Around and Other Stories	Elizabeth Graver
2023	Kelly Sather	Small in Real Life	Deesha Philyaw
2024	Mubanga Kalimamukwento	Obligations to the Wounded	Angie Cruz
2025	Bill Gaythwaite	A Place in the World	Manuel Munõz
