= Shannon Cain =

American writer

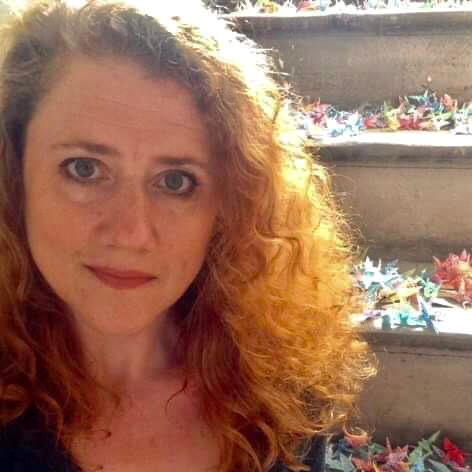
- Shannon Cain, 2016
- Born: June 3, 1964 (age 62)
- Occupations: Writer, editor, teacher, visual artist, activist
- Awards: Drue Heinz Literature Prize (2011)

Academic background
- Education: University of Arizona (B.A.); Warren Wilson College (M.F.A.)

Academic work
- Institutions: University of Arizona; Arizona State University; Bennington College; University of Leipzig
- Website: www.shannonesque.com

Shannon Cain (born June 3, 1964) is an American writer, editor, teacher, visual artist, and activist living in France. She is the founder of La Maison Baldwin, an organization that celebrates the life of James Baldwin in Saint-Paul de Vence. Cain authored the short story collection The Necessity of Certain Behaviors, winner of the 2011 Drue Heinz Literature Prize.

Cain lived in Tucson, Arizona from 1979 to 2013, with a time in New York City from 1988 to 1995. In 2014 the Republic of France awarded her a "skills and talents" visa in the arts, then renewed her permanent resident status in 2019 as a "person of international renown".

== Education and teaching ==
Cain holds a B.A. in French language and literature from the University of Arizona and an MFA in creative writing from the Program for Writers at Warren Wilson College. She has taught creative writing at the University of Arizona, Arizona State University, and in the Bennington College MFA program. In 2011 she was the Picador Guest Professor in Literature at the University of Leipzig in Germany. At the University of Leipzig, Cain taught two classes during the summer term of 2011: "Reading Like a Writer: The Close Reading of Contemporary American Short Stories Through the Lens of the Writer of Literary Fiction" and "Creative Writing and Literary Publishing". In 2014, Cain was a participant for an Association of Writers and Writing Programs panel titled "Designed Instability: Open Endings in Short Fiction."

== Activism ==
Cain began her activist life as a child in the 1970's, demonstrating against the war in Vietnam and in support of the Equal Rights Amendment. After college she became involved in street activism in New York City as a member of WHAM! (Women's Health Action and Mobilization) and of the ACT UP New York affinity group, Action Tours. She served on the board of directors of the Women's Foundation of Southern Arizona. In addition to being a board member, she worked on the grants committee. Since 1991, this foundation has granted over $4 million to more than 100 organizations. She also served on the board of directors for Wingspan—Tucson's LGBTQ Community Center, and Changemakers—a social change, community-based philanthropy. In 2012 she was active in the Occupy movement. Supported by a grant from the Arizona Commission on the Arts, she performed a series of readings as a part of a project titled Tucson, the Novel: An Experiment in Literature and Civil Discourse. Cain explains that she spent three minutes each week reading aloud from her work-in-progress during the Tucson City Council Meetings. For ten days in June 2016, she squatted in the former villa of James Baldwin, which had been slated for demolition. After this ultimately unsuccessful attempt at preserving the Baldwin villa, she founded La Maison Baldwin—a cultural organization in Saint-Paul den Vence that celebrates the life of literary icon James Baldwin. Cain was the co-founder with her daughter Brennan Cain-Nuccio of Paris Against Trump, an ad-hoc group that mobilized 5,000 people into the streets of Paris six days after the 2016 election.

Cain has served as Executive Director for four nonprofit organizations including The Women's Health Education Project, which provided self-care workshops for women living in New York City shelters; the Amazon Foundation—a private philanthropy in southern Arizona; and Kore Press, a feminist literary publisher based in Tucson.

== Writing and editing ==
=== Books ===
- Roadside Curiosities: Short Stories About American Pop Culture (editor, Leipzig University Press, 2014)
- The Necessity of Certain Behaviors (University of Pittsburgh Press, 2011)
- Powder: Writing by Women in the Ranks, from Vietnam to Iraq (co-editor, Kore Press, 2008)

Books edited by Cain have been recognized with The Next Generation Indie Book Award in Short Fiction (For Sale by Owner by Kelcey Parker, Kore Press 2009), The Iowa Short Fiction Prize (November Storm by Robert Oldshue, University of Iowa Press 2016), the Elixir Press Fiction Award (The Wolf Tone by Christy Stilwell, Elixir Press 2016), and the Goodreads Choice Award Nominee 2019 (Prognosis: A Memoir of My Brain by Sarah Vallance, Little A 2019).

Powder was adapted for the stage under the title Coming in Hot by Cain and co-editor Lisa Bowden to be performed by Jeanmarie Simpson.

The Necessity of Certain Behaviors, winner of the 2011 Drue Heinz Literature Prize, is perhaps Cain's most notable work. This collection of short stories explores the themes of sexuality, happiness, and self-fulfillment. The title of this collection received attention from several reviewers. Editors of Bloom dissected the title; hypothesizing that it could mean “The awkward pressure of domestic arrangements.” “The revelatory power of embarrassing situations.”. Cain notes influences of James Baldwin, Kurt Vonnegut, Sandra Cisneros, and Nadine Gordimer. The book was a Finalist for the Lambda Literary Award and the Ferro-Grumley Award for LGBT Fiction

=== Anthologies ===
- The Lineup: 20 Provocative Women Writers (Black Lawrence Press, 2015) "This is How it Starts"
- Winesburg, Indiana (Indiana University Press, 2015) "Occupy Winesburg"
- Pushcart Prize 2013 "Juniper Beach"
- Pushcart Prize 2009 "Cultivation"
- O. Henry Prize Stories 2008 "The Necessity of Certain Behaviors"

==== Short stories ====
- Tin House, "Cultivation"
- New England Review, "The Necessity of Certain Behaviors"
- The Massachusetts Review, "This is How it Starts"
- Colorado Review, "Juniper Beach"
- American Short Fiction, "The Steam Room"
- Mid-American Review, "I Love Bob"
- Booth, "Occupy Winesburg"
- American Literary Review, "Housework"
- Southward, "The Nigerian Princes"

"The Nigerian Princes" was listed among the short stories highly commended by contest judges for the 2010 Sean O'Faolain short story contest.

=== Articles ===
- "How to Cancel a Conference", Business Insider
- "Squatting James Baldwin's House", LitHub
- Sonora Review, "An Open Letter to the Interim Principal at Tucson High"

=== Visual art ===
Cain is also a visual artist who creates large-scale origami sculptures. One project is entitled "Les nouveaux oiseaux." For an event in July 2019 she produced over 1,000 paper cranes in order to raise awareness for the protection of swallows. Her work is represented by the design boutique Projets Intérieurs in Saint-Paul de Vence.

=== Honors and awards ===
Cain was awarded a creative writing fellowship in prose from the U.S. National Endowment for the Arts in 2006, the O. Henry Prize in 2008 and the Drue Heinz Literature Prize in 2009. She also received the Pushcart Prize in 2009 and again in 2013.

She has been a writer-in-residence at the MacDowell Colony, the Ragdale Foundation, the Virginia Center for Creative Arts, the Jentel Foundation, and for the City of Tucson's Ward One Council Office.
