= Lucy Honig =

American short story writer (1948–2017)

- Born: May 7, 1948
- Died: September 18, 2017 (aged 69)
- Education: Syracuse University; Hunter College (MEd)
- Occupation: Writer
- Writing career
- Genre: Short story
- Notable awards: Drue Heinz Literature Prize (1999)

Lucy Honig (May 7, 1948 – September 18, 2017) was an American short story writer.

== Life ==
She graduated from Syracuse University and from Hunter College with a master's in education. She taught in the Boston University School of Public Health.

Her work appeared in AGNI, DoubleTake, Gargoyle, The Gettysburg Review, Ploughshares

== Awards ==
- 1998 Drue Heinz Literature Prize
- 1992, 1996 O. Henry Award for short fiction
- L.L. Winship PEN New England award finalist

== Works ==
=== Short stories ===
- Open Season. Scala House Publishers, LLC. 2002. ISBN 978-0-9720287-2-1.
- The truly needy and other stories. University of Pittsburgh Press. 1999. ISBN 978-0-8229-5781-2. (reprint 2002)
- English as a Second Language. 20 Century American Short Stories - Volume 2. 1995.

=== Novels ===
- Waiting for Rescue: A Novel. Counterpoint. 2009. ISBN 978-1-58243-527-5.
- Picking up: by Lucy Honig. Dog Ear Press. 1986. ISBN 978-0-937966-20-4.

=== Anthologies ===
- Best American Short Stories 1988,
- William Miller Abrahams, ed. (1992). Prize Stories 1992: The O. Henry Awards. Knopf Doubleday Publishing Group. ISBN 978-0-385-42192-8.
- John Edgar Wideman, ed. (2003). 20: The Best of the Drue Heinz Literature Prize. University of Pittsburgh Press. ISBN 978-0-8229-5815-4.
