= Brett Ellen Block =

American novelist and short story writer

- Born: {} Summit, New Jersey
- Education: Iowa Writers' Workshop; University of Michigan
- Writing career
- Pen name: Ellen Block
- Language: English
- Genres: Novel; short story
- Notable awards: Drue Heinz Literature Prize; 2001 Destination Known

Brett Ellen Block (born in Summit, New Jersey) is an American novelist and short story writer.

== Life ==
Block was born and raised in Summit, New Jersey. She received her undergraduate degree in Fine Arts from the University of Michigan, where she was awarded the Hopwood and Haugh Prizes for Fiction Writing. She went on to earn graduate degrees at the Iowa Writers’ Workshop and the University of East Anglia’s Fiction Writing Program.

Her debut collection of short stories, "Destination Known," won the Drue Heinz Literary Prize, and she is a recipient of the Michener-Copernicus Fellowship. She is also the author of the critically acclaimed novel The Grave of God’s Daughter and the Macavity Award-nominated thriller The Lightning Rule.

Writing under the name "Ellen Block" she penned the novel The Language of Sand and its sequel, The Definition of Wind.

She lives in Los Angeles.

== Awards ==
- 2001 Drue Heinz Literature Prize, for Destination Known
- 2003 Michener-Copernicus Fellowship

== Works ==
=== Short stories ===
- Destination Known. University of Pittsburgh Press. September 27, 2001. ISBN 978-0-8229-4168-2.

=== Mystery ===
- The Grave of God's Daughter. William Morrow. March 30, 2004. ISBN 978-0-06-052504-0.
- The Lightning Rule. Harper. November 27, 2007. ISBN 978-0-06-052508-8. (Paperbacks)
- The Language of Sand. Bantam. April 5, 2010. ISBN 978-0-440-24575-9.
- The Definition of Wind. Random House. June 28, 2011. ISBN 978-0-440-24576-6.
