= Kent Nelson (author) =

American short story writer and poet (born 1943)

- Born: 1943 (age 82–83)
- Education: Harvard Law School (JD)
- Occupations: Short story writer; poet
- Writing career
- Notable awards: Drue Heinz Literature Prize (2014)

Kent Nelson (born 1943) is an American short story writer and poet. He holds a JD from Harvard Law School. His 2014 collection The Spirit Bird won the Drue Heinz Literature Prize. Earlier in his literary career, he was awarded a fellowship by the National Endowment for the Arts.

== Bibliography ==
=== Novels ===
- Cold Wind River (Dodd, Mead, 1981)
- All Around Me Peaceful (Dell, 1989)
- Language in the Blood (Peregrine Smith, 1992)
- Land That Moves, Land That Stands Still (Viking, 2003)

=== Short stories ===
- The Tennis Player and Other Stories (University of Illinois Press, 1978)
- The Middle of Nowhere (Peregrine Smith, 1991)
- Discoveries (Western Reflections, 1998)
- Toward the Sun: The Collected Sports Stories (Breakaway, 1998)
- The Touching That Lasts (Johnson, 2006)
- The Spirit Bird (University of Pittsburgh Press, 2014)

== Sources ==
- Robertson, Susan Emrick (1988). "An Interview with Kent Nelson". The Missouri Review. 11 (1): 107–132. doi:10.1353/mis.1988.0024. ISSN 1548-9930. S2CID 162288065.
