= Jennifer Cornell =

American writer

- Education: Ulster University (MA); Cornell University (MFA)
- Occupation: Short story writer
- Writing career
- Notable awards: Drue Heinz Literature Prize (1994)

Jennifer C. Cornell is a Northern Ireland – American short story writer.

== Life ==
She graduated from University of Ulster with an MA, and Cornell University with an MFA in 1994.

She teaches at Oregon State University.

Her work has appeared in New Hibernia Review, Proceedings of the Harvard Celtic Colloquium, TriQuarterly, and New England Review.

== Awards ==
- 1994 Drue Heinz Literature Prize

== Works ==
- Departures and Other Stories. University of Pittsburgh Press. 1995. ISBN 978-0-8229-3855-2.

=== Anthologies ===
- Jane Smiley; Katrina Kenison, eds. (1995). The Best American Short Stories 1995. Houghton Mifflin. ISBN 0-395-71180-0.
- Caledonia Kearns, ed. (November 1997). Cabbage and Bones: An Anthology of Twentieth Century Irish American Women’s Fiction. Holt. ISBN 0-8050-5579-7.
