= Todd James Pierce =

American writer

- Born: September 15, 1965 (age 60); California, U.S.
- Education: University of California, Irvine (MFA); Florida State University (PhD)
- Occupations: Author, professor
- Writing career
- Genres: Fiction, poetry
- Notable works: Newsworld, The Australia Stories (also published as A Woman of Stone)
- Notable awards: Drue Heinz Literature Prize
- Website: toddjamespierce.com

Todd James Pierce (born September 15, 1965) is an American novelist and short story writer.

== Life ==
Todd James Pierce is primarily known as a novelist and short story writer. He is a graduate of the MFA program at UC Irvine and the Ph.D. program at Florida State University. As the winner of the 2006 Drue Heinz Literature Prize, he is the author of four books (listed below), and his work has appeared in over 80 literary journals and magazines including The Georgia Review, The Gettysburg Review, Indiana Review, Iowa Review, Mid-American Review, The Missouri Review, North American Review, Northwest Review, Poets & Writers, Puerto del Sol, Shenandoah, The Sun, and Willow Springs. His short stories have been anthologized in college textbooks and have been listed as distinguished stories in Best American Short Stories. Reviewers have hailed his stories as "robust", filled with an "unexpected sense of grace and ease," and as "a beautiful whirl of love and language, longing and mystery." The New York Times described his collection, Newsworld, as adroitly examining the intersection between mass media and private life: "While Pierce's comedic realism unfolds in the background, his heroes ache in their offices and bedrooms--so desperate to communicate through press releases and letters to the editor that they've forgotten how to whisper into a lover's ear."

Currently he is revising a 600-page narrative nonfiction book that tells the story of the men and women who built the first wave of American theme parks in the 1950s, as well as editing two new anthologies of short fiction: Dead Neon (a collection of post-apocalyptic fiction due out from the University of Nevada Press late in 2010) and Contemporary American Short Shorts (a collection of extremely short stories due out from MacAdam/Cage early in 2011).

He lives in Santa Barbara County and teaches creative writing at California Polytechnic State University.

== Awards ==
- 2006 Drue Heinz Literature Prize for his book, Newsworld, which was selected by Joan Didion.
- The Charles Angoff Award (from The Literary Review)
- Kingsbury Fellowship

== Works ==
- Newsworld. University of Pittsburgh Press. 2006. ISBN 978-0-8229-4299-3.
- A Woman of Stone. MacAdam/Cage. 2006. ISBN 978-1-59692-057-6.
- The Australia Stories: A Novel. MacAdam/Cage Publishing. 2003. ISBN 978-1-931561-28-0. "Todd James Pierce."

=== Non-fiction ===
- Ryan G. Van Cleave; Todd James Pierce, eds. (2006). Behind the Short Story. Pearson Longman. ISBN 978-0-321-11724-3.
- Todd James Pierce (2016). Three Years in Wonderland: The Disney Brothers, C. V. Wood, and the Making of the Great American Theme Park. University Press of Mississippi. ISBN 978-1628462418.

=== Editor ===
- Jarret Keene; Todd James Pierce, eds. (2008). Las Vegas Noir. Akashic Books. ISBN 978-1-933354-49-1.
- Jarret Keene; Todd James Pierce, eds. (2010). Dead Neon: Tales of Near-Future Las Vegas. University of Nevada Press. ISBN 978-0-87417-828-9.
