= Maya Sonenberg =

American short story writer

- Education: Wesleyan University; Brown University
- Occupation: Writer
- Writing career
- Genre: Short story
- Notable awards: Drue Heinz Literature Prize (1989)

Maya Sonenberg is an American short story writer.

== Life ==
She graduated from Wesleyan University, in 1982 and from Brown University, in 1984. She teaches at University of Washington.

Her work appeared in Gargoyle, Santa Monica Review,

She is a member of the Pacific Northwest Writers' Association.

== Awards ==
- 1989 Drue Heinz Literature Prize

== Works ==
- After the Death of Shostakovich Pere (Pank Books, 2018) ISBN 9781948587013,
- "Shadow Play." Alaska Quarterly Review (Autumn 2000).
- "Memento Mori." Other Voices 32 (Spring 2000).
- "Noctambus." Gulf Stream (Spring 2000).
- Cartographies. University of Pittsburgh Press. 1989. ISBN 978-0-8229-3627-5.
- Voices from the Blue Hotel: fictions. Chiasmus Press. 2007. ISBN 978-0-9785499-4-7.

== Reviews ==
In this kaleidoscopic set of "fictions," Maya Sonenberg writes stories about memory and desire that are lucid and memorable because she employs so many distinct voices. Yet there are aspects of this collection that will dash a reader's expectations of what a story is – for better or for worse.
