= McClafferty =

McClafferty is a surname. Notable people with the surname include:

- Carla Killough McClafferty (born 1958), American writer
- Edith McClafferty (born 1960), American politician
- Mark McClafferty, American film and television producer

== See also ==
- McCafferty (surname)
