= Rick Hillis =

Canadian poet and short story writer

- Died: October 6, 2014
- Education: University of Saskatchewan; University of Iowa (MFA)
- Occupations: Poet, short story writer
- Writing career
- Notable awards: Drue Heinz Literature Prize (1990)

Rick Hillis was a Canadian poet and short story writer.

== Life ==
He graduated from the University of Saskatchewan and the Iowa Writers Workshop, with an MFA. He attended Stanford University as a Stegner Fellow and Jones Lecturer in fiction writing, and was also a Chesterfield Film Writers’ Fellow at Universal Studios.

He taught creative writing at a number of institutions, including Reed College, Stanford University, Lewis & Clark College, and the University of Oregon. As well, he was on faculty at the University of Iowa’s Summer Writers’ Festival. He began teaching at DePauw University in 2002.

== Awards ==
- 1990 Drue Heinz Literature Prize, for Limbo River
- Gerald Lampert Award finalist

== Works ==
=== Short stories ===
- Limbo River. University of Pittsburgh Press. 1990. ISBN 978-0-8229-3653-4.

=== Poetry ===
- The Blue Machines of Night. Coteau Books. 1988. ISBN 978-0-919926-76-9.

== Death ==
Rick Hillis died on October 6, 2014.
