= Elizabeth Graver =

American writer and academic (born 1964)

- Born: July 2, 1964 (age 62); Los Angeles, California, U.S.
- Education: Wesleyan University (BA); Washington University in St. Louis (MFA)
- Occupations: Author, professor

Elizabeth Graver (born July 2, 1964) is an American writer and academic.

== Early life and education ==
Graver was born in Los Angeles on July 2, 1964, and grew up in Williamstown, Massachusetts. Both her parents, Suzanne and Lawrence Graver, were professors of English at Williams College. She received her B.A. from Wesleyan University in 1986, and her M.F.A. from the Washington University in St. Louis in 1999. She also did graduate work at Cornell University.

== Career ==
A recipient of fellowships from Guggenheim Foundation, the MacDowell Colony, Yaddo, the National Endowment for the Arts, and the Suzy Newhouse Center for the Humanities at Wellesley College, she has been a Professor of English and Creative Writing at Boston College since 1993.

Graver’s 2023 novel, Kantika, was inspired by the migration story of her Turkish Sephardic Jewish maternal grandmother, Rebecca, whose journey took her from Turkey to Spain, Cuba and New York. Reviewer Ayten Tartici wrote, in the New York Times Book Review: "In Graver’s vision, migration is never simply a one-way street . . . Kantika is a meticulous endeavor to preserve the memories of a family, an elegy and a celebration both." Kantika was a 2023 New York Times Notable Book and Best Historical Novel and has been translated into Turkish and German. Kantika was awarded a National Jewish Book Award for Sephardic Culture, the Edward Lewis Wallant Award, the Julia Ward Howe Prize, the Massachusetts Book Award for Fiction, and a Jewish Fiction Award.

Graver's 2013 novel, The End of the Point, was long-listed for the 2013 National Book Award and has met with praise since its release. The novel, featured by The New York Times Book Review editor Alida Becker, is set in a summer community on the coast of Massachusetts from 1942 through 1999 and is a layered meditation on place and family across half a century. Graver's first novel, Unravelling, is set in 19th-century America in the Lowell textile mills and tells the story of a fiercely independent young woman and the life she eventually fashions for herself. Benjamin DeMott, reviewing it for The New York Times, wrote that Unravelling "creates a home-on-the-margins beyond cant—a kind of exiles' utopia, intensely imagined, right-valued, memorable." The Honey Thief, a contemporary novel exploring a mother-daughter relationship, was reviewed in The New York Times by Katharine Weber, who described it as a narrative in which "neither resolution nor redemption is guaranteed—or even, necessarily, hoped for."

== Personal life ==
Married to civil rights lawyer James Pingeon, Graver is the mother of two grown daughters and teaches at Boston College.

== Works ==
=== Novels ===
- Kantika (Metropolitan Books/Henry Holt & Co. 2023)
- The End of the Point (HarperCollins 2013)
- Awake (Henry Holt & Co. 2005)
- The Honey Thief (Hyperion 2000)
- Unravelling (Hyperion 1999)

=== Short stories ===
- "Little Red Schoolhouse," Issue 55,The Adroit Journal
- Have You Seen Me? (University of Pittsburgh Press 1991) Drue Heinz Literature Prize (Judge: Richard Ford).
- ”The Mourning Door” by Graver, Elizabeth. Ploughshares, vol. 26, no. 2/3, 2000, pp. 80–89.

=== Anthologies (selected) ===
- "All Aunt Hagar's Children: Edward P. Jones, B-Sides Books: Essays on Forgotten Favorites 2021, John Plotz, ed.
- "Two Baths": Best American Essays 1991, Cynthia Ozick, guest ed.
- “The Mourning Door”: ''Best American Short Stories 2001, Barbara Kingsolver, guest ed.; Prize Stories 2001: The O. Henry Awards, Mary Gordon, Michael Chabon, Mona Simpson, guest eds; Pushcart Prize XXVI: Best of the Small Presses, Bill Henderson, ed.
- “Between”: Prize Stories 1996: The O. Henry Awards, William Abrahams, ed.
- “The Boy Who Fell Forty Feet”: Prize Stories 1994: The O. Henry Awards, William Abrahams, ed.
- “The Body Shop”: Best American Short Stories 1991, Alice Adams, guest ed.
