= Big Bend, Waukesha County, Wisconsin =

Big Bend, Wisconsin
- Village
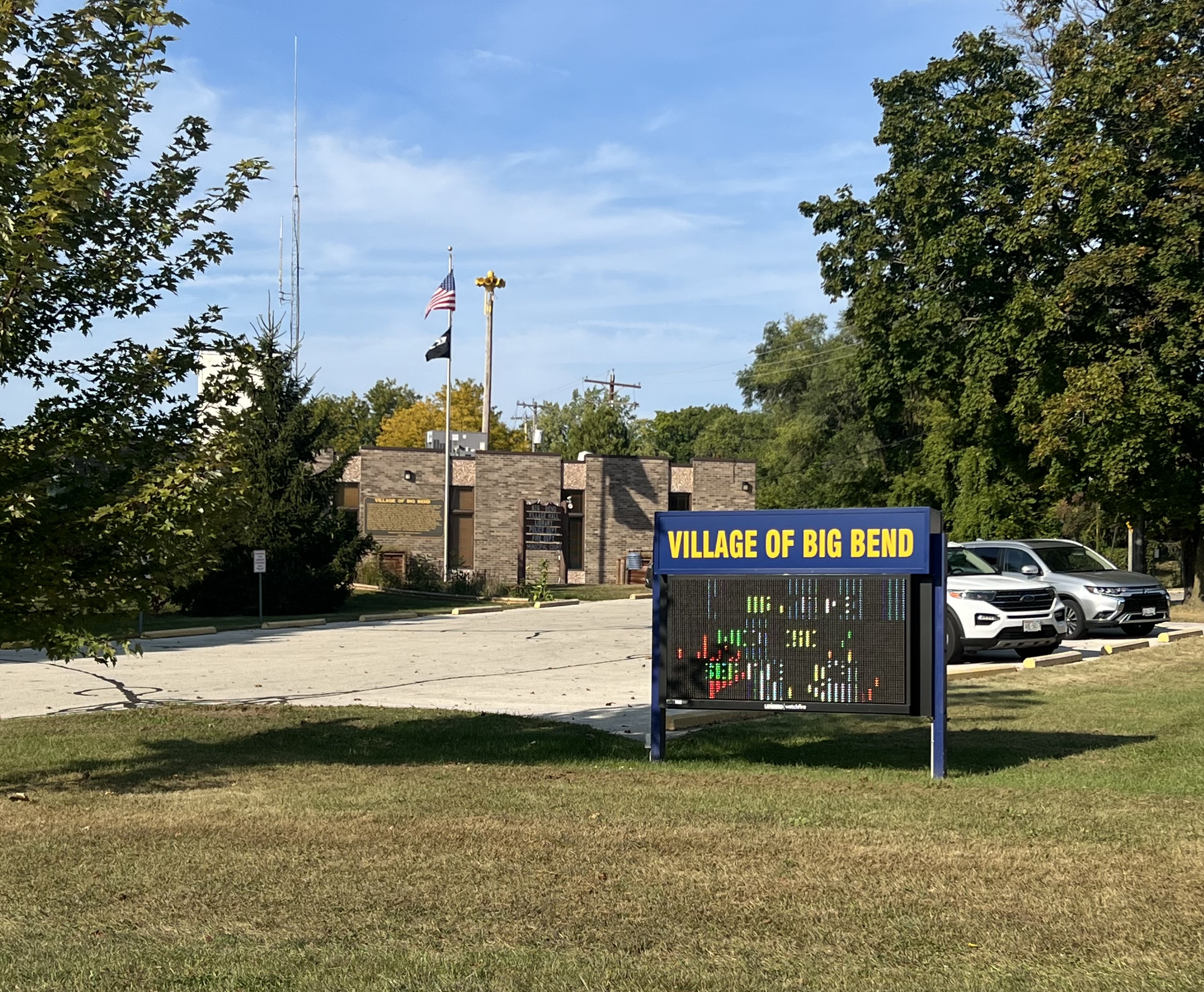
- Village hall

- Location of Big Bend in Waukesha County, Wisconsin.
- Coordinates: 42°53′16″N 88°12′41″W
- Country: United States
- State: Wisconsin
- County: Waukesha

Area
  - Total: 3.30 sq mi (8.54 km^{2})
  - Land: 3.25 sq mi (8.42 km^{2})
  - Water: 0.046 sq mi (0.12 km^{2})

Population (2020)
  - Total: 1,483
  - Density: 450.7/sq mi (174.03/km^{2})
- Time zone: UTC-6 (Central (CST))
  - Summer (DST): UTC-5 (CDT)
- ZIP Code: 53103
- Area code: 262
- FIPS code: 55-07200
- GNIS feature ID: 1582806
- Website: www.villageofbigbend.com

Big Bend is a village in Waukesha County, Wisconsin, United States. The population was 1,483 at the 2020 census.

== History ==
Big Bend was named by indigenous peoples for the change of direction in the Fox River.

The first European-American settlers arrived from Andover, Vermont in 1846.

== Geography ==
Big Bend is located at 42°53′16″N 88°12′41″W (42.887862, -88.211333).

According to the United States Census Bureau, the village has a total area of 3.15 square miles (8.16 km^{2}), of which 3.11 square miles (8.05 km^{2}) is land and 0.04 square miles (0.10 km^{2}) is water.

Big Bend is located on the banks of the Fox River. The town is situated beside a portion of the river where it changes course from east to south, hence the name "Big Bend".

== Demographics ==
Historical population
Census	Pop.	Note	%±
1930	309		—
1940	298		−3.6%
1950	480		61.1%
1960	797		66.0%
1970	1,148		44.0%
1980	1,345		17.2%
1990	1,299		−3.4%
2000	1,278		−1.6%
2010	1,290		0.9%
2020	1,483		15.0%
U.S. Decennial Census

=== 2010 census ===
As of the census of 2010, there were 1,290 people, 486 households, and 375 families living in the village. The population density was 414.8 inhabitants per square mile (160.2/km^{2}). There were 503 housing units at an average density of 161.7 per square mile (62.4/km^{2}). The racial makeup of the village was 97.9% White, 0.2% African American, 0.2% Native American, 0.5% Asian, 0.1% Pacific Islander, 0.1% from other races, and 1.1% from two or more races. Hispanic or Latino of any race were 2.3% of the population.

There were 486 households, of which 35.4% had children under the age of 18 living with them, 63.4% were married couples living together, 9.1% had a female householder with no husband present, 4.7% had a male householder with no wife present, and 22.8% were non-families. 16.9% of all households were made up of individuals, and 5.7% had someone living alone who was 65 years of age or older. The average household size was 2.65 and the average family size was 3.00.

The median age in the village was 40.8 years. 23.9% of residents were under the age of 18; 7.4% were between the ages of 18 and 24; 24.6% were from 25 to 44; 33.1% were from 45 to 64; and 11.1% were 65 years of age or older. The gender makeup of the village was 49.8% male and 50.2% female.

=== 2000 census ===
As of the census of 2000, there were 1,278 people, 448 households, and 348 families living in the village. The population density was 564.6 people per square mile (218.3/km^{2}). There were 457 housing units at an average density of 201.9/sq mi (78.1/km^{2}). The racial makeup of the village was 97.26% White, 0.47% African American, 0.55% Native American, 0.23% Asian, 0.39% Pacific Islander, 0.39% from other races, and 0.70% from two or more races. 1.80% of the population were Hispanic or Latino of any race.

There were 448 households, out of which 37.5% had children under the age of 18 living with them, 66.1% were married couples living together, 6.9% had a female householder with no husband present, and 22.1% were non-families. 17.6% of all households were made up of individuals, and 7.8% had someone living alone who was 65 years of age or older. The average household size was 2.85 and the average family size was 3.21.

In the village, the population was spread out, with 28.9% under the age of 18, 7.0% from 18 to 24, 30.0% from 25 to 44, 25.0% from 45 to 64, and 9.0% who were 65 years of age or older. The median age was 37 years. For every 100 females, there were 106.5 males. For every 100 females age 18 and over, there were 107.5 males.

The median income for a household in the village was $56,767, and the median income for a family was $61,771. Males had a median income of $40,583 versus $26,528 for females. The per capita income for the village was $22,072. About 0.9% of families and 2.9% of the population were below the poverty line, including 5.0% of those under age 18 and 1.7% of those age 65 or over.

== Education ==
Christ Lutheran School is a PreK3-8th grade school of the Wisconsin Evangelical Lutheran Synod in Big Bend.

The village is also part of the Mukwonago Area School District. Big Bend Elementary School, within the village limits, serves grades K-6. Older students go to Parkview Middle School and Mukwonago High School.

== Hygena Spring #2 ==
In the late 1860s, Waukesha County was known as the “Saratoga of the West” due to plentiful, clean, and pure springs. At a time when many major municipal water supplies were tainted, the springs of Waukesha County were believed to have healing properties. They drew thousands of visitors to the springs and bath houses located in the county.

During the early 1890s, local entrepreneur James M McElroy hatched a plan to pipe water from the Hygeia Spring, located in the Town of Waukesha, more than 100 miles to the Columbian Exposition in Chicago. Despite the fresh water of Lake Michigan, the Chicago River was contaminated with raw sewage, and many feared the water shortage would dissuade people from attending the exhibition. McElroy was to receive 8.5 cents per gallon, after commission, for shipping the water from Waukesha to Chicago.

On May 12, 1892, a trainload of laborers and iron pipe were forced to retreat from the spring when village residents, armed with cannons and rifles, ordered them to leave the spring alone. Locals feared the mass pumping from the spring would destroy other springs in the area. After this mishap, McElroy purchased a spring outside of the Town of Waukesha in what is now the Village of Big Bend. He called it Hygena Springs II. McElroy did build his 100-mile pipe to Chicago, but once the water reached the exhibition, it was said to be stale and tasteless.

Hygena Spring II still flows today. Though the spring is located on private property, the owners allow the public to enjoy the water.

== Notable people ==
- David Craig, politician
- Nicholas Godejohn, convicted of the 2015 murder of Dee Dee Blanchard, his at that time, girlfriend's mother, in Springfield, Missouri.
- Hal Peck, baseball player.
- Delbert K. Smith, Wisconsin politician, was born in Big Bend.
- James Tormey, Wisconsin politician
- Ellen Hunnicutt, author
- David J. Eicher, editor, writer, and popularizer of astronomy and space.
