= Ellen Hunnicutt =

American author (1931–2003)

- Born: May 4, 1931; Portland, Indiana, U.S.
- Died: June 24, 2003 (aged 72); Big Bend, Waukesha County, Wisconsin, U.S.
- Education: Ball State University; El Camino College; University of Wisconsin–Milwaukee
- Occupation: Author
- Spouse: 3
- Writing career
- Pen name: E. M. Hunnicutt
- Notable awards: Drue Heinz Literature Prize (1987)

Ellen Hunnicutt (May 4, 1931 – June 24, 2003) was an American author.

== Life ==
Ellen Hunnicutt was born in Portland, Indiana. She attended Ball State University, El Camino College, and the University of Wisconsin–Milwaukee, with a bachelor's degree and master's degree in 1984.

Her father was a musician and teacher and her grandfather was a violin maker. She married an engineer; they had three sons. She turned to children's fiction, writing as "E. M. Hunnicutt."

Her work appeared in Cimarron Review, Indiana Review, Michigan Quarterly Review, Mississippi Review, Prairie Schooner, "Boys Life," and South Dakota Review.

A resident of Big Bend, Wisconsin, she taught piano and creative writing at Waukesha County Technical College, and University of Wisconsin–Milwaukee.

She died at her home in Big Bend, June 24, 2003, at age 72.

== Awards ==
- 1986 Wisconsin Arts Board Literary Arts Fellowship
- 1987 Drue Heinz Literature Prize for, In the Music Library
- 1988 Banta Award, for Suite for Calliope
- first prize in fiction from the Council for Wisconsin Writers
- 2012 Wisconsin Library Association "Notable Wisconsin Author"

== Works ==
=== Novels ===
- Suite for Calliope. Dell Publishing. 1989. ISBN 978-0-440-50088-9. (reprint)

=== Short stories ===
- "Carrot Man", Boys Life, December 1991
- "The Clearing", Wisconsin academy review, Fall 1992
- In the music library. University of Pittsburgh Press. 1987. ISBN 978-0-8229-3567-4.

=== Anthologies ===
- Nathaniel Knaebel, ed. (2004). "from Suite for Calliope". Step right up: stories of carnivals, sideshows and the circus. Carroll & Graf Publishers. ISBN 978-0-7867-1332-5.
- Scott Walker, ed. (1991). The Graywolf Annual Eight: The New Family. Graywolf Press.
- John Edgar Wideman, ed. (2003). "At St. Theresa's College for Women". The Best of the Drue Heinz Literature Prize. University of Pittsburgh Press. ISBN 978-0-8229-5815-4.
