= A Place for Us =

Novel by Fatima Farheen Mirza

- Cover of first edition
- Author: Fatima Farheen Mirza
- Audio read by: Deepti Gupta and Sunil Malhotra
- Language: English
- Set in: California
- Publisher: SJP for Hogarth
- Publication date: June 12, 2018
- Publication place: United States
- Media type: Print (hardcover and paperback), e-book, audiobook
- Pages: 400
- ISBN: 978-1-5247-6355-8 (hardcover)
- OCLC: 1027136947
- Dewey Decimal: 813/.6
- LC Class: PS3613.I79 P57 2018

A Place for Us is the debut novel of Fatima Farheen Mirza, published in New York on June 12, 2018. It is the first book published by Sarah Jessica Parker's new imprint, SJP for Hogarth. The novel focuses on the varied experiences of an Indian-Muslim family living in Northern California, striving to find a balance between tradition and modernity. The family of five is left to search for home in a metaphorical and literal sense. The audience is given glimpses of the family life from the beginning, from Layla finding out about Rafiq’s proposal, to the two of them arriving in America, and their three children later finding themselves stuck between living their own lives and the lives their parents and culture expect them to follow.

== About the author ==
Fatima Farheen Mirza was born in California, US in 1991. Both of her parents are of Indian descent. She graduated from the Iowa Writers’ Workshop, where she was a recipient of the Michener-Copernicus Fellowship. She is married to the British actor Riz Ahmed.

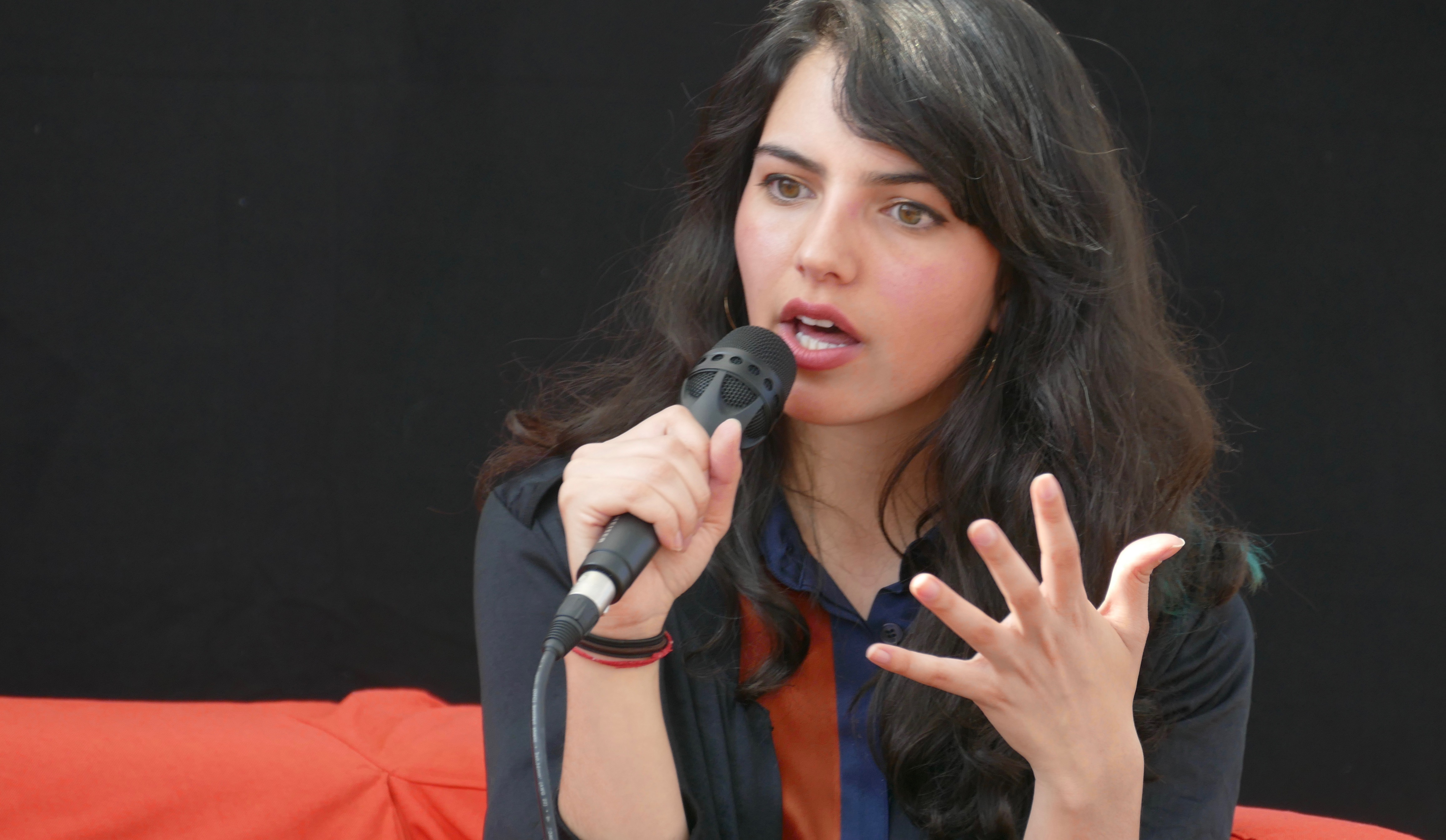
Fatima Farheen Mirza in March 2019.

== Plot ==
The book is split up into four parts.

Part one opens at the eldest daughter, Hadia’s wedding in Northern California. Rather than accepting an arranged marriage, Hadia decides to build her life with a man of her choice, Tariq, whom she met in medical school. Hadia decides to invite their estranged brother, Amar, who returns after 3 years of no communication with his family. He is confronted with the familiarity of the faces from his past life when greeting the guests, including his first love, Amira Ali. His family watches him from a distance, careful not to say anything to upset him. Their mother, Layla, is frantically running around, attending to guests, and making sure that her daughter’s event flows smoothly. She searches for her husband, Rafiq, in the crowd to look at him and share a moment to appreciate where they came to in life.

Part two of the book gives readers glimpses of the past that offer insight into how everything led up to the wedding. It opens with a memory of the Fourth of July, the first one Hadia recalls celebrating. The three young siblings begged their father to take them to see the fireworks. Hadia and her sister Huda sit together cross-legged, eyes lighting up in awe from the fireworks. A young Amar, meanwhile, is leaning against his mother, eyes wide in wonder.

The scene jumps to a young Layla in India, talking to her younger sister Sara about a potential proposal from a man named Rafiq in America. She wonders about the houses and the roads there and if she will follow Rafiq to America.

As young children, Hadia worries about Amar, who lies to protect her and Huda, further upsetting their father. She thinks about what her understanding of jealousy is by listening to her mother’s comments about other women. She also thinks about how she feels about other girls talking about Abbas Ali, her childhood crush.

Rafiq comes home one night with the news that Abbas has died in a car accident. Both Hadia and Amar join Rafiq in the car to stop by the Ali house to grieve with the family. Amar stops by Amira’s (Abbas's younger sister) room, both of them finding the slightest comfort in each other’s presence.

Layla travels back home to Hyderabad, India without the rest of her family. She seeks comfort in her prayers and love for God. Amar gets into a fight at school after the September 11 attacks when three boys corner him in the locker room and tell him to go back to his country. They tell him that Rafiq looks like a terrorist, and Amar throws the first punch at one of the boys. When Rafiq is called by the school nurse to come get him, Amar wishes his mother was there to get him instead.

During the wedding of a member of their community, Amira and Amar meet to go on a private walk on the seventeenth floor. Amar recalls a guy named Simon, who survived the car accident Abbas died in. He follows him to a party and drinks beer for the first time. He debates telling Amira but does not want to change the way she thinks of him.

Months before Hadia’s graduation, she takes her younger siblings to an ice cream shop. Amar confides in his sisters; he tells them that he feels as if he no longer belongs at school due to being a Muslim. At the masjid, he struggles to listen to religious lectures. He recalls the time he and Abbas discussed religious stories and how they would someday leave and create a life for themselves.

Layla finds a box in Amar’s room containing photos of Amira. She panics, thinking that Amira will be a distraction for Amar. This results in her going to the Ali house to talk to Amira’s mom to expose their children’s relationship. Amira’s parents force her to end things with Amar, due to his bad reputation.

At the final family dinner before Hadia's departure for medical school, Hadia asks anyone if they have seen her watch, which results in Rafiq accusing Amar. Amar goes silent and feels as if he is watching his life from someone else’s perspective. He worries that his heart is so stained by sins that he cannot recover. He resorts to pills to deal with the loss of Abbas, Amira and what he thinks is the loss of love of his parents.

Part three opens back up at Hadia’s wedding. The parents notice Amira and Amar talking. Amar is surprised that Amira asked to speak to him in private. He actively puts in effort to pretend as if he no longer loves her. He knows that even if he finds another woman, he will always care for Amira. He shows her the scars from his needles and asks her not to tell anyone. Amar confides in her and tells her that he struggled after they broke up. Amira tells him that it was his mother who came to her house to tell her mother about their relationship. Amar begins to spiral and starts drinking at a nearby bar. He sits outside the venue trying to recover so he can go back for his sister. Rafiq is sent out by Layla to find Amar for the family photo. Amar realises that he is exhausted of being angry and cries into his father’s arms.

Part four is from Rafiq's perspective; he is speaking to Amar as if he were there beside him. At an older age, Rafiq is being admitted into the hospital where Hadia is working. This is the first time he is able to witness her working. Hadia is now a respected doctor and a mother of two children. Addressing Amar, Rafiq speaks about his grandchildren, Abbas and Tahira, and shows that he is much more calm and loving now. He finds himself throwing out Amar’s old exams, only to take it back out of the trash and place it in his desk drawer. Rafiq reflects on his mistakes and where he went wrong with Amar, admitting that he believes it was his fault that Amar left.

== Characters ==
=== Major ===
==== Amar ====
Amar is the youngest sibling and only boy of the family. He is a strong focus throughout the book and is one of the narrators. Throughout the book Amar struggles to define who he is, and the emotional turmoil he has faced causes him to act out. His wavering relationship with religion ends up placing a strain on his relationship with his parents. He struggles to find his place within his family, causing him to feel like he is looking at his family from an outsider's perspective.

==== Hadia ====
Hadia is one of the four main characters/ narrators. Her wedding is one of the pivotal moments throughout the book, where the audience is given glimpses of her as an adult woman getting married, and shifting back to scenes throughout her childhood to see how she got there. As the oldest girl, Hadia struggles with how strict her parents are, which is what causes her to feel jealousy towards Amar due to the leniency their parents give him.

==== Rafiq ====
Readers are given glimpses of Rafiq's life when he and his newlywed wife migrated to America. Rafiq is depicted as a cold and reserved father. He is often quite hard on his children, especially Amar. The last chapter of the book is from Rafiq's point of view, and it is revealed that he has been diagnosed with a brain tumor. Rafiq reflects on his relationship with Amar, and blames himself for him running away.

==== Layla ====
Layla is seen as the soft-hearted mother, and is shown to have a special connection with her son, Amar. Readers are shown snippets of Layla's life from when she is first discussing a potential proposal in India with her younger sister, to her and Rafiq's married life with children. Layla chooses to keep the peace with Rafiq, rather than pushing him and argue. She gets upset with the way that he yells at their children, but thinks that he always reserves himself when he argues with her. She views her husband as a constant blessing in her life.

=== Minor ===
==== Huda ====
Huda is the middle sibling, and is generally on the outskirts of the chaos going around. Readers are only given certain glimpses of Huda's life, causing her to be seen as a side character to the drama surrounding the rest of her family.

==== Abbas ====
Abbas Ali is one of the Muslim boys in their community. Abbas is the first guy Hadia takes a romantic interest in, and she has a secret crush on him for years. As a teenager, Abbas takes Amar under his wing. Abbas's sudden death from a car accident later on heavily affects both Hadia and Amar. Amar loses someone he considered a brother and confidant, and Hadia loses a chance at true love, and the potential for what her life could have been.

==== Amira ====
Amira is the younger sister of Abbas, and the romantic interest of Amar. After Abbas' death, Amira and Amar began their secret relationship.

== Critical reception ==
A Place for Us made its way onto the New York Times Best Seller List for books. The book was featured as one of the best books of 2018 by NPR, Refinery29, and The Washington Post.
