= Suzanne Greenberg =

American short story writer

Suzanne Greenberg is an American short story writer.

== Life ==
She graduated from Hampshire College and from the University of Maryland with an MFA. She teaches at California State University, Long Beach.

Her work has appeared in The Washington Post Magazine, Mississippi Review, West Branch and The Sun.

She lives in Long Beach with her husband and three children.

== Awards ==
- 2003 Drue Heinz Literature Prize, for Speed-Walk and Other Stories
- 2004 John Gardner Fiction Book Award finalist

== Works ==
- Speed-Walk and Other Stories. University of Pittsburgh Press. 2003. ISBN 978-0-8229-4217-7.
- Lesson Plans. Prospect Park Books. 2014. ISBN 978-1-9388-4924-4.

=== Juvenile Fiction ===
- Lisa Glatt; Suzanne Greenberg (2009). Abigail Iris: The One and Only. Illustrator Joy Allen. Walker & Company. ISBN 978-0-8027-9782-7.
- Lisa Glatt; Suzanne Greenberg (2010). Abigail Iris: The Pet Project. Illustrator Joy Allen. Walker & Company. ISBN 978-0-8027-8657-9.

=== Non-fiction ===
- Anna Leahy, ed. (January 2005). "An 'A' for Effort: How Grading Policy Shapes Courses". Power and Identity in the Creative Writing Classroom: The Authority Project. Multilingual Matters, Ltd. ISBN 978-1-85359-846-3.
- Michael Cecil Smith; Suzanne Greenberg (1996). Everyday Creative Writing: Panning for Gold in the Kitchen Sink. NTC Publishing Group. ISBN 978-0-8442-5900-0.
