= Barbara Croft =

American writer

- Occupation: Writer

Barbara Croft is an American writer.

== Life ==
She grew up in Iowa. She is a member of the Society of Midland Authors. She lives in Chicago.

== Awards ==
- 1998 Drue Heinz Literature Prize

== Reviews ==
There are only two facts, birth and death, and in between some necessary fictions.” In the case of the Gerhardt family, the once-functional fictions are fraying, unraveling into a painful tangle of self-healing truths. And the sense of relief spills over to the reader, who shares the catharsis.

== Works ==
- Primary colors and other stories. New Rivers Press. 1991. ISBN 978-0-89823-124-3.
- Necessary Fictions. University of Pittsburgh Press. 1998. ISBN 9780822940784.
- Moon's crossing. Houghton Mifflin Harcourt. 2003. ISBN 978-0-618-34153-5.
