= Kore Press =

Nonprofit literary press in Tucson, Arizona

- Founded: 1993
- Founder: Lisa Bowden and Karen Falkenstrom
- Country of origin: United States
- Headquarters location: Tucson, Arizona
- Publication types: Books
- Official website: www.korepress.org

Kore Press is an American nonprofit literary press founded in 1993 and located in Tucson, Arizona. The press publishes poetry, fiction, and creative nonfiction by women including cis, transgender, and gender non-conforming women. Kore Press's output includes books, audio CDs, and broadsides.

The press was co-founded by Lisa Bowden (publisher) and poet Karen Falkenstrom. Shannon Cain was its Executive Director from 2004 to 2009. Kore Press publishes manuscripts accepted through general submission and annually awards prizes for a first book of poetry, a single short story and a memoir or a memoir-in-essays.

Kore Press titles are distributed by Independent Publishers Group. The press has received grants from the National Endowment for the Arts and awards including the National Book Foundation's Innovations in Reading Prize.

Notable authors published by Kore Press include Alison Hawthorne Deming, Carolyn Hembree, Ofelia Zepeda, Linda Hogan, and Jennifer Barber. Author Kelcey Parker's book For Sale by Owner was the 2011 recipient of the Next Generation Indie Book Award in Short Fiction.

In 2010, Kore Press produced a one-woman play titled "Coming In Hot," depicting women's accounts of military service in recent conflicts around the world. The play was based on the press's 2008 anthology Powder: Writing by Women in the Ranks from Vietnam to Iraq, co-edited by Lisa Bowden and Shannon Cain.

As part of their commitment to social activism, in 2011 Kore Press began a series of justice programming. Their first project, Big Read Tucson 2011, was held in conjunction with the National Endowment for the Arts’ literacy initiative Big Read. Kore's 10-week community engagement program involved 40 local partners and celebrated the life and work of poet Emily Dickinson with a variety of events. For their 2014 cross-generational program The Listening Project, teenage girls interviewed female service members and veterans about their lives and experiences serving in the military. Their radio stories were broadcast publicly and were used to create an on-line, audio archive on civil discourse. In 2016, in conjunction with over 25 health, cultural and justice organizations, Kore Press organized Unsilencing Anatomies, a two-month, community-wide event that looked at the ways ethnicity, sexuality and gender affect people’s experiences with health and the medical system. In 2017, the press hosted poet, experimental vocalist and scholar Tracie Morris for a local performance to address the issues of race, gender and class.
