= Jonathan Penner (writer) =

American writer (born 1940)

Jonathan Penner (born 1940 in Bridgeport, Connecticut) is an American fiction writer.

== Life ==
Jonathan Penner earned a B.A. from the University of Bridgeport in 1964. His graduate degrees are from the University of Iowa: M.F.A. (1966), M.A. (1972), and Ph.D. (1975). In 1977–78, he was a Postdoctoral Fellow at the University of Edinburgh. He taught fiction writing at the New School for Social Research, Southern Illinois University, Vanderbilt University, the University of Hawaii, and the University of Arizona, from which he retired in 2008 as professor emeritus. He has been married since 1968 to the writer Lucille Recht Penner, and since 1978 has lived in Tucson.

His stories have appeared in Harper's Magazine, Grand Street, Paris Review, Commentary, and Ploughshares.

== Awards ==
- 1983 Drue Heinz Literature Prize, for Private Parties
- National Endowment for the Arts Fellowship
- Guggenheim Fellowship
- Arizona Commission on the Arts Fellowship
- Fulbright Fellowship to Yugoslavia
- 2002 Spokane Prize for Short Fiction, for This is My Voice

== Works ==
=== Novels ===
- Going Blind. Simon and Schuster. February 1977. ISBN 978-0-671-22442-4.
- The Intelligent Traveler's Guide to Chiribosco. Galileo Press. January 1983. ISBN 978-0-913123-01-0.
- Natural Order. Poseidon Press. June 1990. ISBN 978-0-671-66423-7.

=== Short Story Collections ===
- Private Parties. University of Pittsburgh Press. October 1983. ISBN 978-0-8229-3488-2.
- This Is My Voice. Eastern Washington University Press. October 2003. ISBN 978-0-910055-87-1.

=== Anthologies ===
- Dennis Trudell, ed. (1996). "At Center". Full court: a literary anthology of basketball. Breakaway Books. ISBN 978-1-55821-504-7.
