= Anthony Varallo =

Anthony Varallo (born June 12, 1970) is an author and professor of English at the College of Charleston.

== Biography ==
Anthony Varallo was born and raised in Yorklyn, Delaware. He attended the University of Delaware where he received a bachelor's degree in both English and History in 1992. In 1997 he graduated from the Iowa Writers’ Workshop with an MFA. He met his wife, writer Malinda McCollum, in the program. He later went on to pursue his PhD in Creative Writing at the University of Missouri in 2005. He serves as the fiction editor of Crazyhorse (now swamp pink) at the College of Charleston. He now lives in Charleston, South Carolina, with his wife and two children.

== Books ==
- Everyone Was There (stories), Elixir Press, 2017
- Think of Me and I’ll Know (stories), TriQuarterly Books/Northwestern University Press, 2013
- Out Loud (stories), University of Pittsburgh Press, 2008
- This Day in History (stories), University of Iowa Press, 2005

== Fellowships ==
- Emerging Writer Fellowship, The Writer's Center, Bethesda, MD, 2010
- National Endowment for the Arts, Fellowship in Literature, 2002.
- Creative Writing Fellowship, University of Missouri-Columbia, 2000.
- Iowa Arts Fellowship, University of Iowa, 1995.

== Awards and distinctions ==
- 2016 Elixir Press Fiction Prize. Elixir Press, Denver, CO.
- 2013 Balcones Fiction Prize, Austin Community College. Finalist for Think of Me and I’ll Know.
- The 2008 Drue Heinz Literature Prize, University of Pittsburgh Press, 2008.
- The 2006 Paterson Fiction Prize. Finalist, for This Day in History.
- The 2006 South Carolina Fiction Project. Winner.
- The John Simmons Short Fiction Award, University of Iowa Press, 2005.
- The Journal First Annual Short Story Award, The Journal, 2004. First Place.
- The Crazyhorse Short Story Award, Crazyhorse, 2002. First Prize.
- Association of Writing Programs Intro Journals Award, 2001.
- Thomas W. Molyneux Prose Award, University of Delaware's student literary magazine, Caesura Magazine, 1991. First Prize.
