= Rick DeMarinis =

American writer (1934–2019)

- Born: May 3, 1934; New York City, U.S.
- Died: June 12, 2019 (aged 85)
- Education: University of Montana
- Occupations: Novelist, short story writer
- Spouse(s): Mary Lee; Carol
- Children: 3
- Writing career
- Notable awards: Drue Heinz Literature Prize (1986)

Rick DeMarinis (May 3, 1934 – June 12, 2019) was an American novelist and short story writer.

== Life ==
DeMarinis was born in New York City to "Big Al" DeMarinis, an Italian gangster, and Ruth Siik, a Finnish dancer. After their divorce, he was sent briefly to a Catholic boarding school before his mother took him to live with her relatives in Michigan. He led an itinerant childhood with his mother, living in Michigan, Texas, New York, and California twice while his mother pursued work opportunities. After high school he joined the Air Force in hopes of seeing the world, but was instead stationed in Havre, Montana.

In Havre he met his first wife, Mary Lee, with whom he had two children. After his time in the Air Force, he went to work in the aviation industry at both Lockheed and Boeing, experiences which influenced his novel Scimitar. He then returned to school, attending the University of Montana to study literature. There he met his second wife, Carol, in a poetry class, whom he would later have another child with.

He taught at the University of Montana, San Diego State University, Arizona State University, and the University of Texas at El Paso. While at Montana he lived across the street from Richard Hugo, who he considered his mentor, and down the block from James Welch, a frequent writing partner. It was during this time he published his first novel, A Lovely Monster.

His short stories have appeared in Esquire, The Atlantic Monthly, Harpers, GQ, The Paris Review, and The Iowa Review.

DeMarinis died on June 12, 2019, due to complications from Lewy body dementia.

== Awards ==
- Two National Endowment for the Arts fellowships
- 1986 Drue Heinz Literature Prize for short fiction
- 1990 Literature Award from the American Academy and Institute of Arts and Letters
- 1999 Jesse H. Jones Award for fiction from the Texas Institute of Letters
- 2000 Independent Publishers Award for the best book of short fiction

== Works ==
=== Novels ===
- A Lovely Monster: The Adventures of Claude Rains and Dr. Tellenbeck: a novel. Simon and Schuster. 1975. ISBN 978-0-671-22175-1.
- Scimitar. Avon Books. 1977. ISBN 0-380-01873-X.
- Cinder. Farrar Straus & Giroux. 1978. ISBN 0-374-12364-0.
- The Burning Women of Far Cry. Arbor House. 1986. ISBN 0-87795-815-7.
- The Year of the Zinc Penny. Seven Stories Press. 2004. ISBN 978-1-58322-638-4. (1st edition 1989)
- The Mortician's Apprentice. W.W. Norton and Company. 1994. ISBN 0-393-03662-6.
- A Clod of Wayward Marl. Dennis McMillan Publications. 2001. ISBN 978-0-939767-37-3.
- A Sky Full of Sand. Dennis McMillan Publications. 2003. ISBN 978-0-939767-47-2.
- Mama's Boy. Seven Stories Press. 2010. ISBN 978-1-58322-911-8.
- El Paso Twilight. Bangtail Press. 2015. ISBN 978-0962378973.

=== Short fiction ===
- Jack & Jill: Two Novellas and a Story. E.P. Dutton. 1979. ISBN 0-525-13575-8.
- Under the Wheat. University of Pittsburgh Press. 1986. ISBN 978-0-8229-3544-5.
- The Voice of America. W.W. Norton & Company. 1991. ISBN 0-393-02967-0.
- The Coming Triumph of the Free World: Stories. W. W. Norton & Company. 1991. ISBN 978-0-393-30746-7. "Rick DeMarinis."
- Borrowed Hearts: New and Selected Stories. Seven Stories Press. 2000. ISBN 978-1-58322-040-5.
- "Desperado". blackbird.vcu.edu. Fall 2002.
- Apocalypse Then: Stories. Seven Stories Press. 2004. ISBN 978-1583226377.

=== Non-Fiction ===
- The Art and Craft of the Short Story. iUniverse.com. 2008. ISBN 978-0-595-52229-3.

=== Anthologies ===
- Shannon Ravenel; Tony Earley, eds. (1999). "Borrowed Hearts". New stories from the South: the year's best, 1999. Algonquin Books. p. 90. ISBN 978-1-56512-247-5. "Rick DeMarinis."
- Donna Seaman, ed. (2002). "weeds". In our nature: stories of wildness. University of Georgia Press. ISBN 978-0-8203-2457-9.
