= McCafferty (surname) =

McCafferty is a surname of Irish origin. It is derived from the Irish Mac Eachmharcaigh, meaning "son of Eachmharcach". Notable people with the surname include:

- Archie McCafferty, Scottish-born Australian serial killer
- Bill McCafferty (1882–1929), Scottish footballer
- Christine McCafferty (born 1945), English politician
- Dan McCafferty (1946–2022), Scottish singer
- Don McCafferty (1921–1974), American footballer and coach
- Ian McCafferty (born 1944), Scottish athlete
- Ian McCafferty (born 1956), British economist
- Jack McCafferty (1914–1999), Australian businessman
- Jane McCafferty, American writer
- John McCafferty, British scientist
- John Edgar McCafferty (1920–1980), American Catholic bishop
- Megan McCafferty (born 1973), American writer
- Neil McCafferty (born 1984), Northern Irish footballer
- Nell McCafferty (1944–2024), Irish journalist and playwright
- Owen McCafferty (born 1961), Northern Irish playwright
