= David Bosworth =

American writer

David Bosworth is an American writer born in 1947.

== Life ==
He graduated from Brown University. He teaches at University of Washington.

== Awards ==
- 1981 Drue Heinz Literature Prize
- Ingram Merrill Foundation Award

== Works ==
- Conscientious Thinking: Making Sense in Post-Modern Times. University of Georgia Press, 2017. ISBN 978-0-8203-5065-3
- The Demise of Virtue in Virtual America: The Moral Origins of the Great Recession. 2014. Front Porch Republic Books.
- The Death of Descartes. University of Pittsburgh Press. 1981. ISBN 978-0-8229-3448-6. (short stories)
- From My Father, Singing. Pushcart Press. 1989. ISBN 978-0-916366-50-6.
- "The Science of Self-Deception." Salmagundi Fall 1999/Winter 2000.

=== Anthologies ===
- Dwight Furrow, ed. (2004). "The Spirit of Capitalism 2000". Moral soundings: readings on the crisis of values in contemporary life. Rowman & Littlefield. ISBN 978-0-7425-3370-7.
