= David Harris Ebenbach =

American poet

David Ebenbach
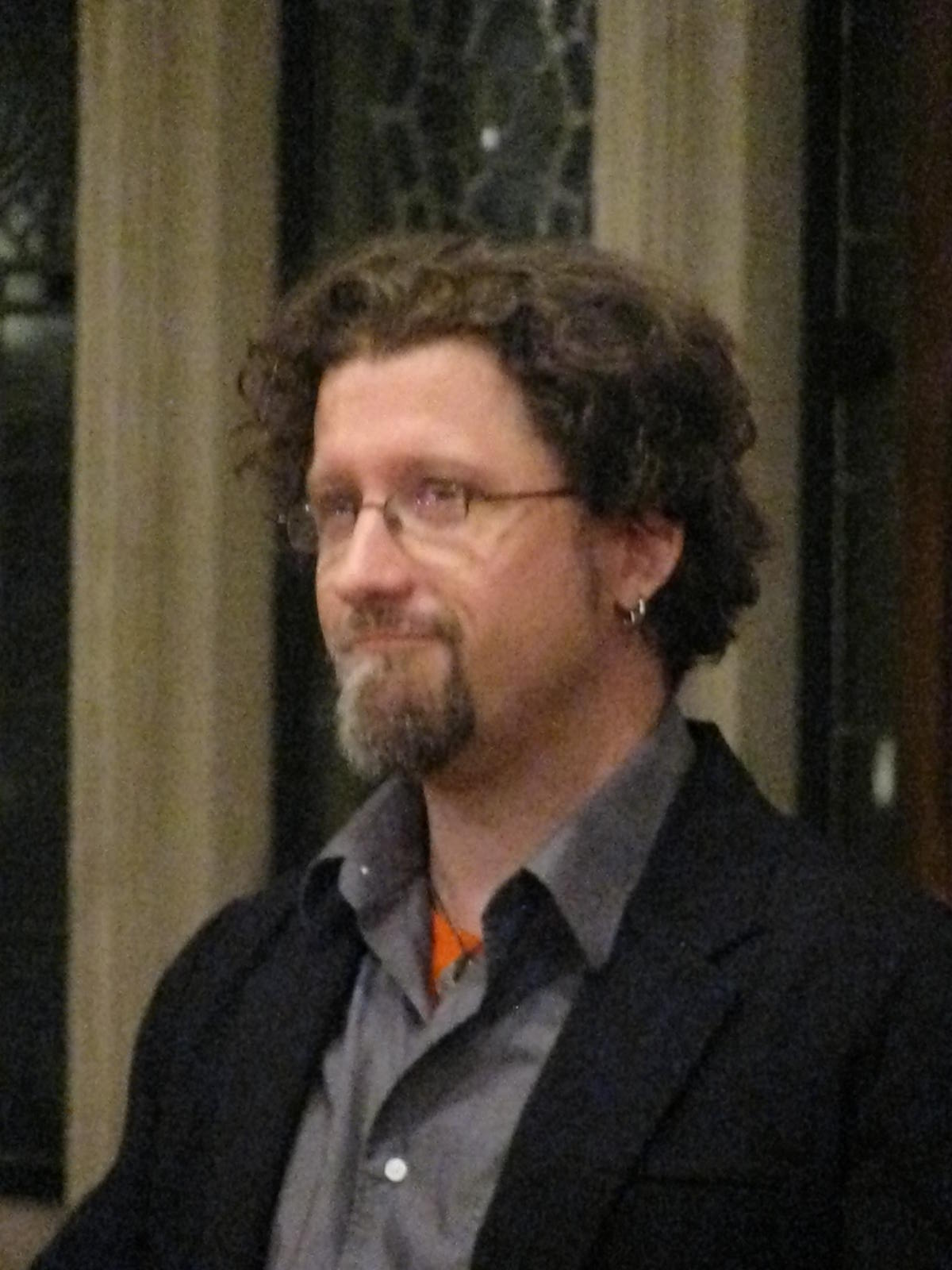
- David Ebenbach, at Georgetown University 2013
- Born: April 19, 1972 (age 54); Philadelphia, Pennsylvania, U.S.
- Education: University of Wisconsin–Madison; Vermont College
- Occupations: Writer, poet, professor
- Writing career
- Genres: Poetry; Short Story

David Harris Ebenbach (born April 19, 1972) is a U.S. writer of fiction and poetry, a teacher, and an editor. He is the author of nine books, and he is the recipient of the Drue Heinz Literature Prize, the Juniper Prize and the Patricia Bibby Award.

Ebenbach's first science fiction novel, How to Mars, was published in 2021.

== Life ==
Ebenbach was born and raised in Philadelphia. He graduated from the University of Wisconsin–Madison with a Ph.D. in Psychology, and from Vermont College with an MFA. He was a visiting professor at Earlham College, living in Ohio. He currently teaches creative writing at Georgetown University, where he works in the Center for Jewish Civilization, and promotes student-centered teaching at the Center for New Designs in Learning and Scholarship.

== Awards ==
- Juniper Prize for Fiction, for The Guy We Didn't Invite To The Orgy
- Patricia Bibby Award, for We Were The People Who Moved
- Washington Writers’ Publishing House Fiction Prize, for Into the Wilderness
- Drue Heinz Literature Prize, for Between Camelots
- GLCA New Writer's Award.

== Works ==
=== Fiction ===
- Between Camelots. University of Pittsburgh Press. 2005. ISBN 978-0-8229-4268-9. (short stories)
- Into the Wilderness. Washington Writers' Publishing House. 2012. ISBN 9780931846656. (short stories)
- The Guy We Didn't Invite to the Orgy and other stories. University of Massachusetts Press. 2017. ISBN 978-1-62534-261-4. (short stories)
- Miss Portland. Orison Books. 2017. ISBN 978-0-9964397-1-8 (novel)
- How to Mars. Tachyon Publications. 2021. ISBN 978-1-61696-356-9 (novel)

=== Non-fiction ===
- The Artist's Torah. Wipf and Stock Publishers. 2012. ISBN 978-1-62032-205-5. (non-fiction guide to creativity)

=== Poetry ===
- Autogeography. Northwestern University Press. 2013. ISBN 978-1622292011
- We Were the People Who Moved. Tebot Bach. 2015. ISBN 978-1939678195
- Some Unimaginable Animal. Orison Books. 2019. ISBN 978-1949039238

=== Poetry in anthologies ===
- America's Future Poetry & Prose in Response to Tomorrow. Washington Writers’ Publishing House. 2025. ISBN 978-1-941551-52-3.
