= Maude Campbell-Jansen =

American composer and musician

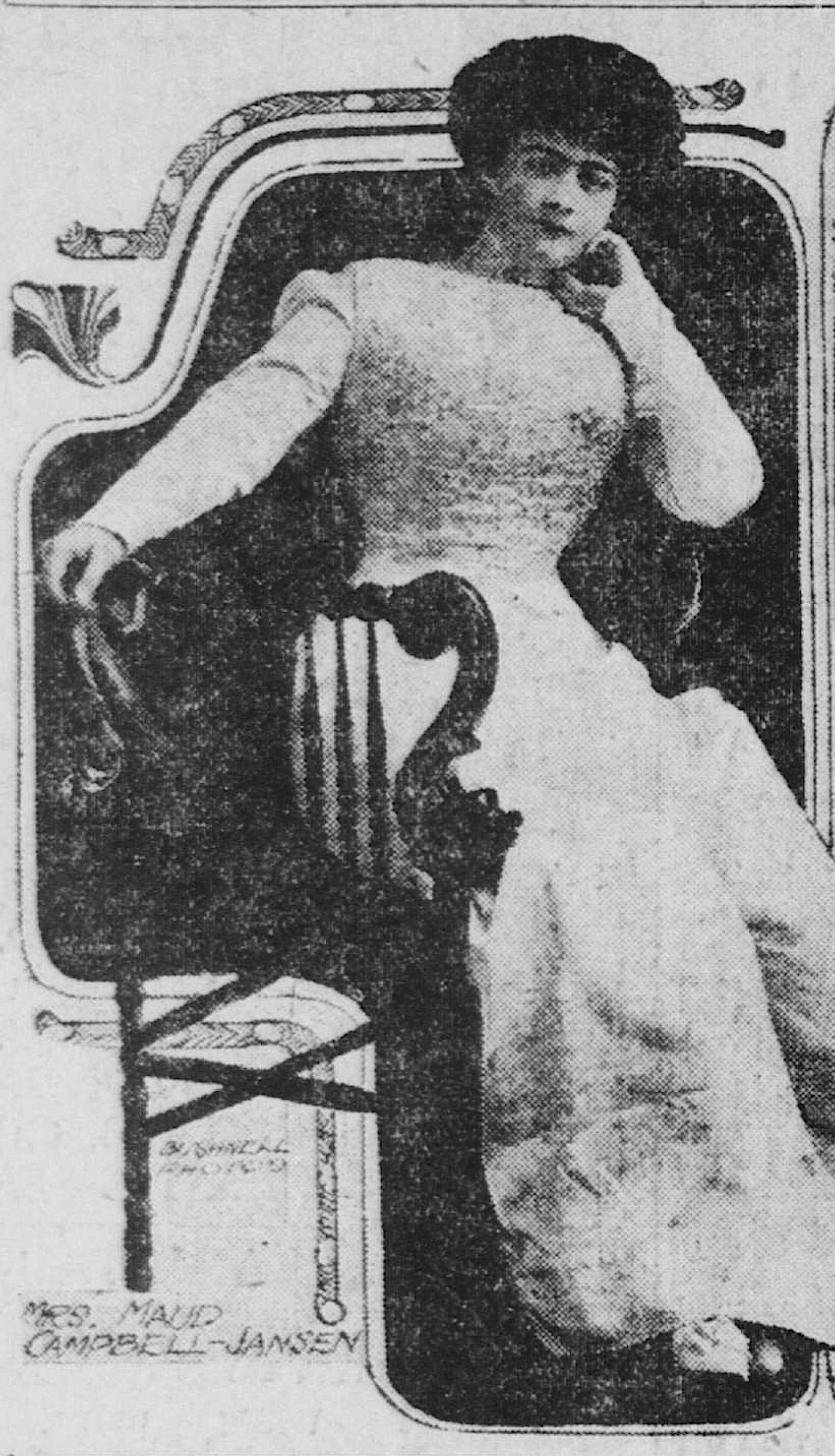
Mrs Maude Campbell-Jansen in 1910.

Maude Campbell-Jansen (Michigan, 6 June 1884 – d. Santa Cruz, California, 4 November 1958) was an American composer and musician.

== Life ==
Maude Campbell-Jansen attended the Notre Dame High School in San Jose, California. In 1930 she set to music the words of the school hymn 'Alma Mater' still used to the present day.

On 21 May 1933 the Oakland Tribune newspaper reported that Mrs. Maude Campbell Jansen was 'president of the Notre Dame Alumnae of Belmont'.

In 1940 she was living with her husband Conrad Jansen and two daughters at 621 North Third Street, San Jose.

== Works ==
– 1928

- Lullaby. Song for medium voice with piano: words and music by the composer.
- Meditation. In versions for solo piano and for solo organ (New York: G. Schurmer).
  Advertised performances:
  1. Harrisburg PA (USA) 19 November 1939. Second Evangelical Reformed Church.
  2. Rushville IN (USA) 8 Jan. 1950. First United Presbyterian Church.

– 1930

- Alma Mater. The school hymn of Notre Dame High School.

_ 1953

- Ave Maria. Accompanied solo voice.
  The premiere of this work was reported in the Santa Cruz Sentinel newspaper, 10 May 1953 "To Sing Original Ave Maria by Mrs Campbell-Jansen. Rita Clifford, mezzo-soprano, will sing an original Ave Maria by Maud Campbell-Jansen, member of the famed Campbell family of California, at the 11 a.m. mass at St. Joseph's church in Capitola this morning. Mrs Campbell-Jansen will be present to hear the solo. She is the house guest of her son-in-law and daughter, Mr. and Mrs. S. Clair Ellis of Capitola. Arnold McCoy will furnish the accompaniment on the Hammond organ."
