= Jonathan Blum (writer, born 1967) =

American writer

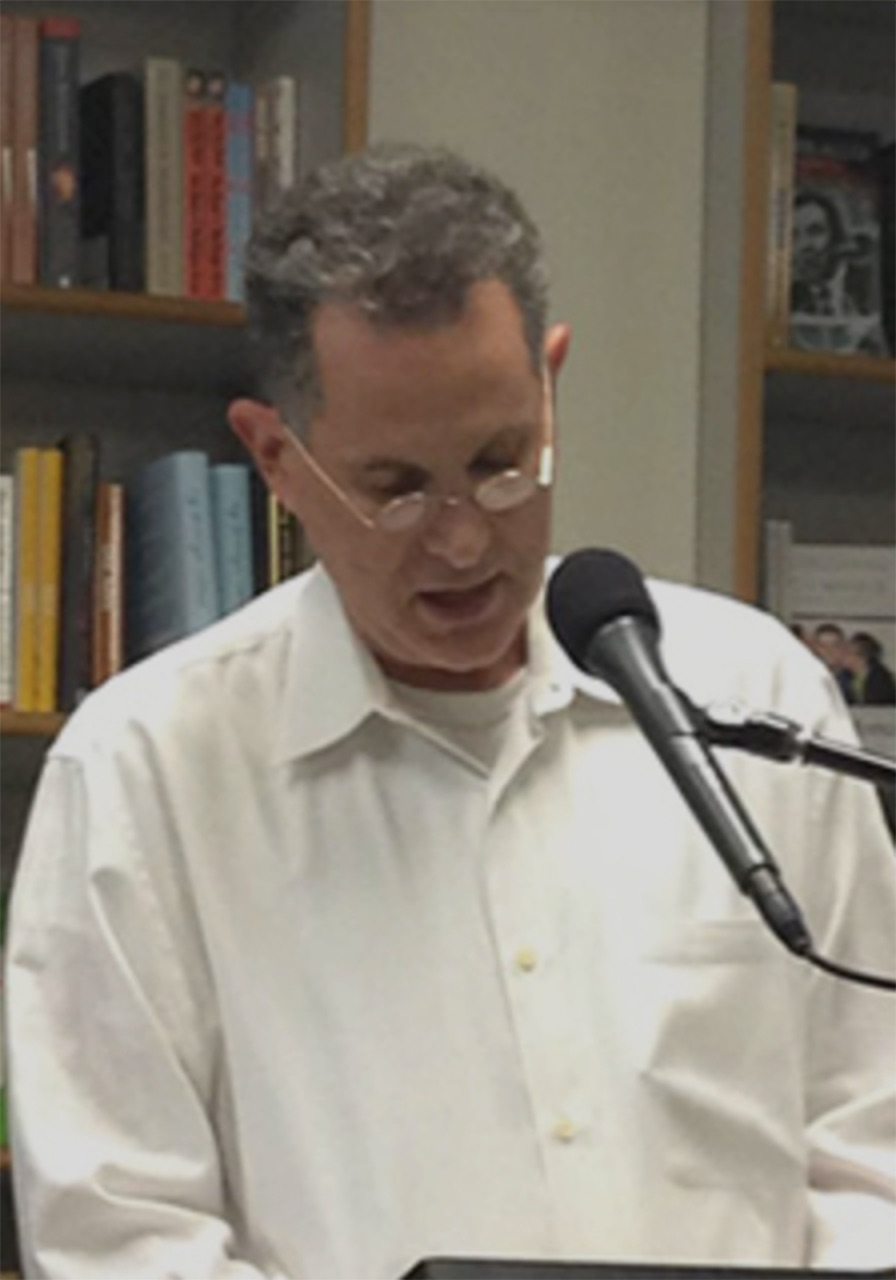
Jonathan Blum reading at Prairie Lights Books, Iowa City, 2014

Jonathan Blum (born 1967) is an American writer.

== Early life and education ==
Blum was born into a Jewish family in Philadelphia, but grew up in Miami, Florida. Blum would go on to graduate from UCLA and the Iowa Writers' Workshop. While studying at the latter, Blum would win the 1997 Playboy College Fiction Contest with his story, "The Kind Of Luxuries We Felt We Deserved".

== Writing ==
Blum published his debut novella, Last Word, in 2013 through Rescue Press. Stephen Lovely in The Iowa Review called Last Word "a masterful finesse of unreliable narration." Six years later, Blum would again work with Rescue Press to publish his short story collection, The Usual Uncertainties, which Electric Literature went on to name one of the 15 Best Short Story Collections of 2019. The collection would also appear on Iowa Public Radio's Winter 2019 list of best new fiction.

Blum's short fiction has appeared in Angels Flight • literary west, The Carolina Quarterly, Electric Literature, Green Mountains Review, Gulf Coast, The Hopkins Review,Kenyon Review, New York Stories, Northwest Review, Other Voices, Playboy, Shanxi Literature, Sonora Review and Zaum.

Additionally, Blum has taught fiction writing at Drew University and the Iowa Summer Writing Festival,

== Awards ==
Blum has won the Michener-Copernicus Society of America literary award, a Helene Wurlitzer Foundation fellowship, and a Hawthornden fellowship. His personal essay, "May Be Habit Forming" was a Notable Essay in Best American Essays 2000, edited by Robert Atwan and Alan Lightman.

== Personal life ==
Blum resides in Los Angeles, California.
