= Leslie Pietrzyk =

American writer

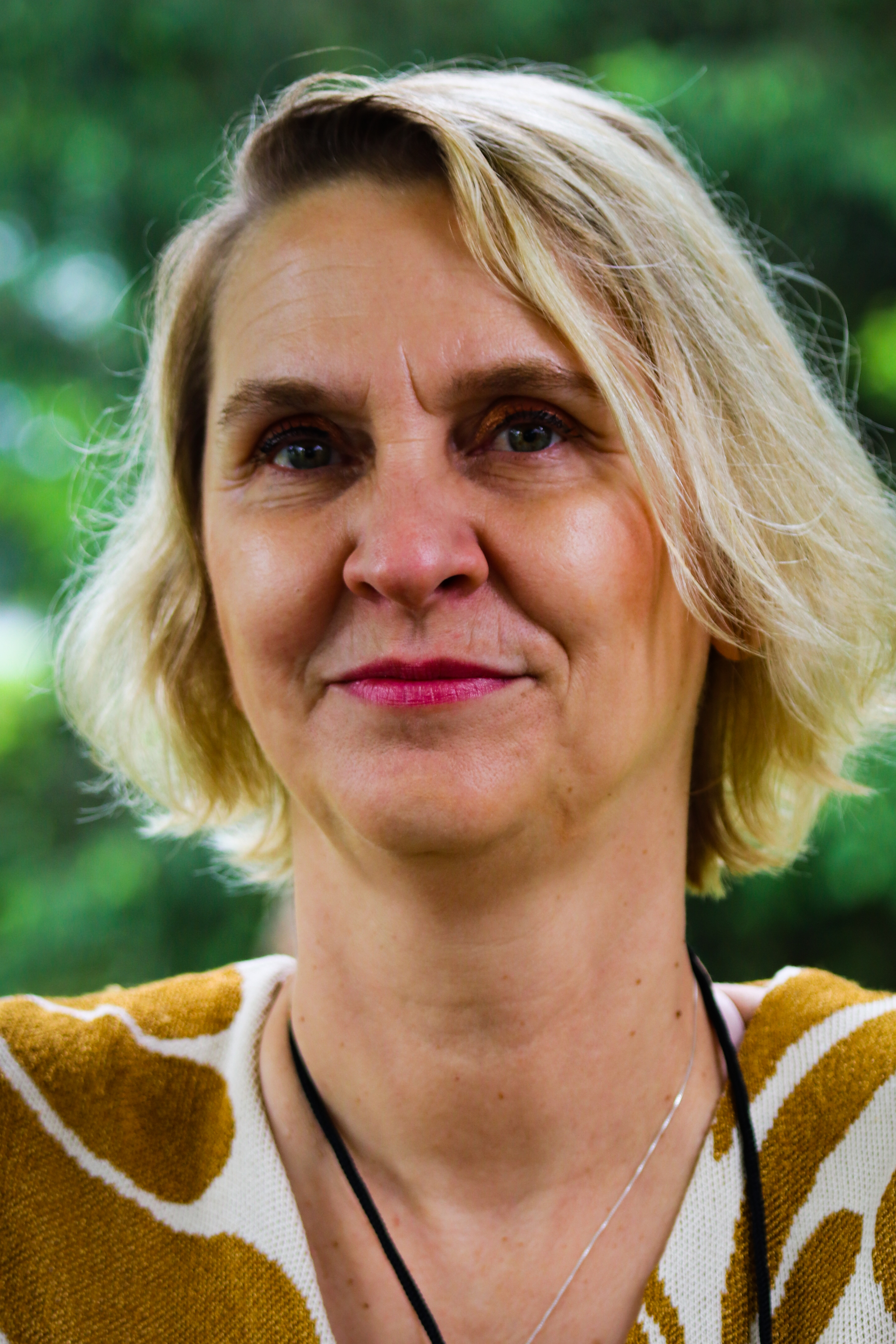
- Author at the 2018 Gaithersburg Book Festival
- Born: 1961
- Education: Northwestern University, American University
- Occupation: Writer
- Employer: Johns Hopkins University
- Awards: Drue Heinz Literature Prize
- Website: www.lesliepietrzyk.com

Leslie Pietrzyk is an American author who has published three novels, Pears on a Willow Tree, A Year and a Day, and Silver Girl, as well as two books of short stories, This Angel on My Chest and Admit This To No One. An additional historical novel, Reversing the River, set in Chicago on the first day of 1900, was serialized on the literary app, Great Jones Street.

== Career ==
Her short fiction has appeared in The Gettysburg Review, The Iowa Review, New England Review, The Sun, Ploughshares, River Styx, The Washington Post Magazine, TriQuarterly, and Shenandoah.

She holds a B.A. in English/Creative Writing from Northwestern University and an M.F.A. in creative writing from American University. She lives in Alexandria, Virginia, and teaches in the Masters in Writing program at Johns Hopkins University as well as the Low-Residency MFA program at Converse College in Spartanburg, South Carolina.

Pietrzyk is also the founder and editor of Redux, an online journal featuring previously published work.

== Personal life ==
In a 2015 Salon piece, Pietrzyk wrote that she met her first husband in college, that he died of a heart attack at age 37, after they had been married for ten years, and that she later remarried.

== Awards and honors ==
- Her first short story collection, This Angel on My Chest., won the 2015 Drue Heinz Literature Prize.
- Pietrzyk's story "Stay There," first published in The Southern Review and later included in her 2021 collection of linked short stories, Admit This To No One, won a 2020 Pushcart Prize.
- Pietrzyk was a co-winner of the Polish American Historical Association's 2020 Creative Arts Prize, awarded to artists "who have promoted an awareness of the Polish experience in the Americas."
- Other awards include residencies to Hawthornden Castle, the Wolff Cottage in Fairhope (AL), Writer in Residence at ARGS, Virginia Center for Creative Arts, Kimmel Harding Nelson Center, and The Hambidge Center.
- Short story awards include the Jeanne Charpiot Goodheart Prize for Fiction from Shenandoah and the Chris O’Malley Fiction Prize from Madison Review.

== Works ==
- Pears on a Willow Tree, New York, NY Bard 1998. ISBN 9780380976676, OCLC 245707562
- A Year and a Day: a Novel, New York : William Morrow, 2003. ISBN 9780060554651, OCLC 223590478
- This Angel on My Chest : stories, Pittsburgh, PA : University of Pittsburgh Press, 2015. ISBN 9780822944423, OCLC 910334443
- Silver Girl, Los Angeles, CA: Unnamed Press, 2018. ISBN 9781944700515, OCLC 1025341666
- Admit This To No One: Stories, Unnamed Press, 2021.
