= Michener-Copernicus Fellowship =

The Michener-Copernicus Fellowship is a literary award available to graduates of the Iowa Writers' Workshop. It is funded by the Copernicus Society of America.

Past recipients include:

- Danielle Trussoni
- Anthony Swofford
- Peter Craig
- Emily Barton
- Rebecca Johns
- Brett Ellen Brock
- Justin Kramon
- Malena Watrous
- Andrew J. Porter
- Nam Le
- Kevin Gonzalez
- Drew Keenan
- Jonathan Blum
- Tony Tulathimutte
- Carmen Maria Machado
- Adam Soto
- Fatima Farheen Mirza
