= Fatima Farheen Mirza =

American author (born 1991)

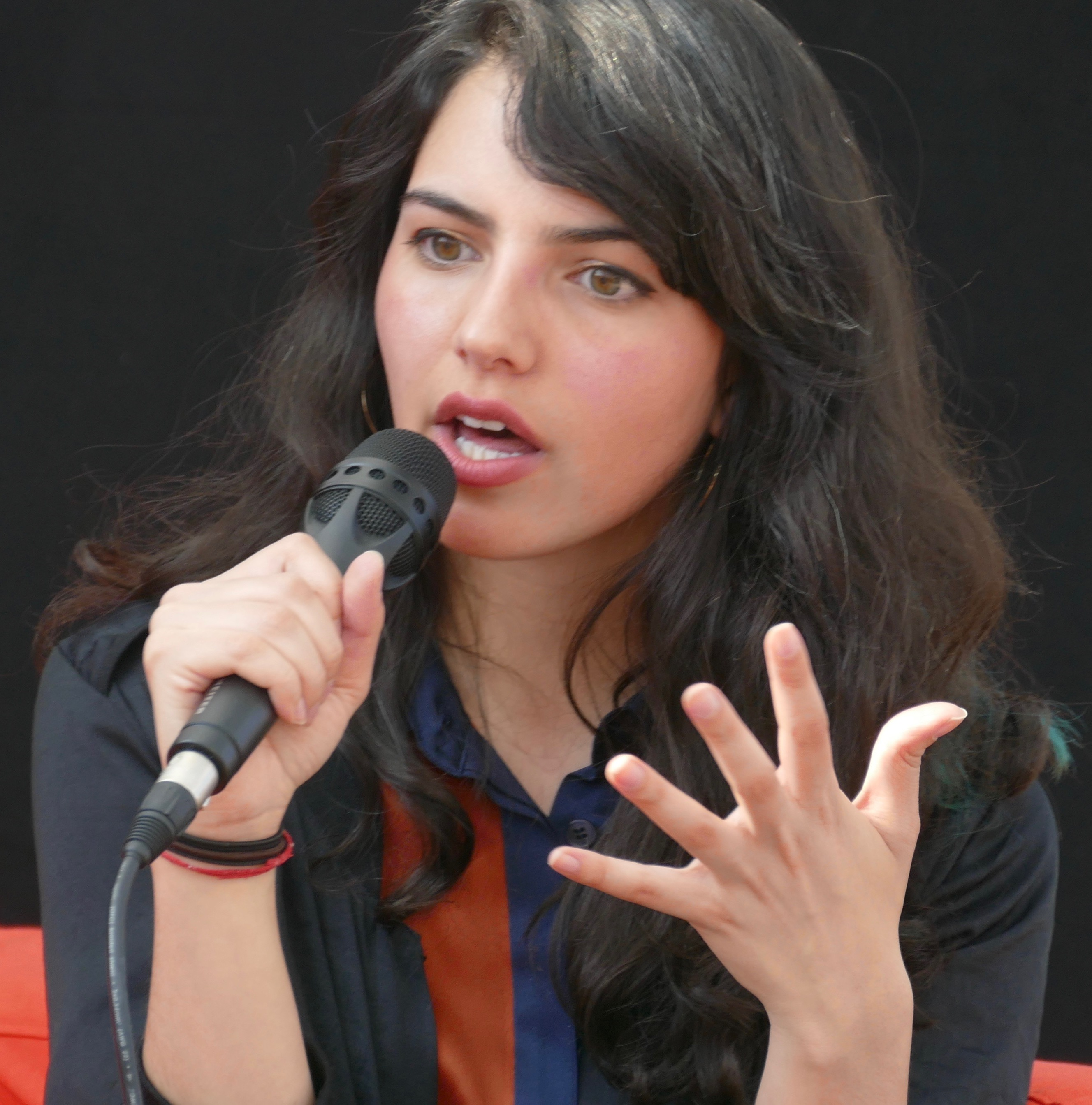
- Mirza in 2019
- Born: April 10, 1991 (age 35); California, U.S.
- Education: University of California (BA); University of Iowa (MFA)
- Occupation: Novelist
- Spouse: Riz Ahmed (m. 2020)
- Children: 1

Signature
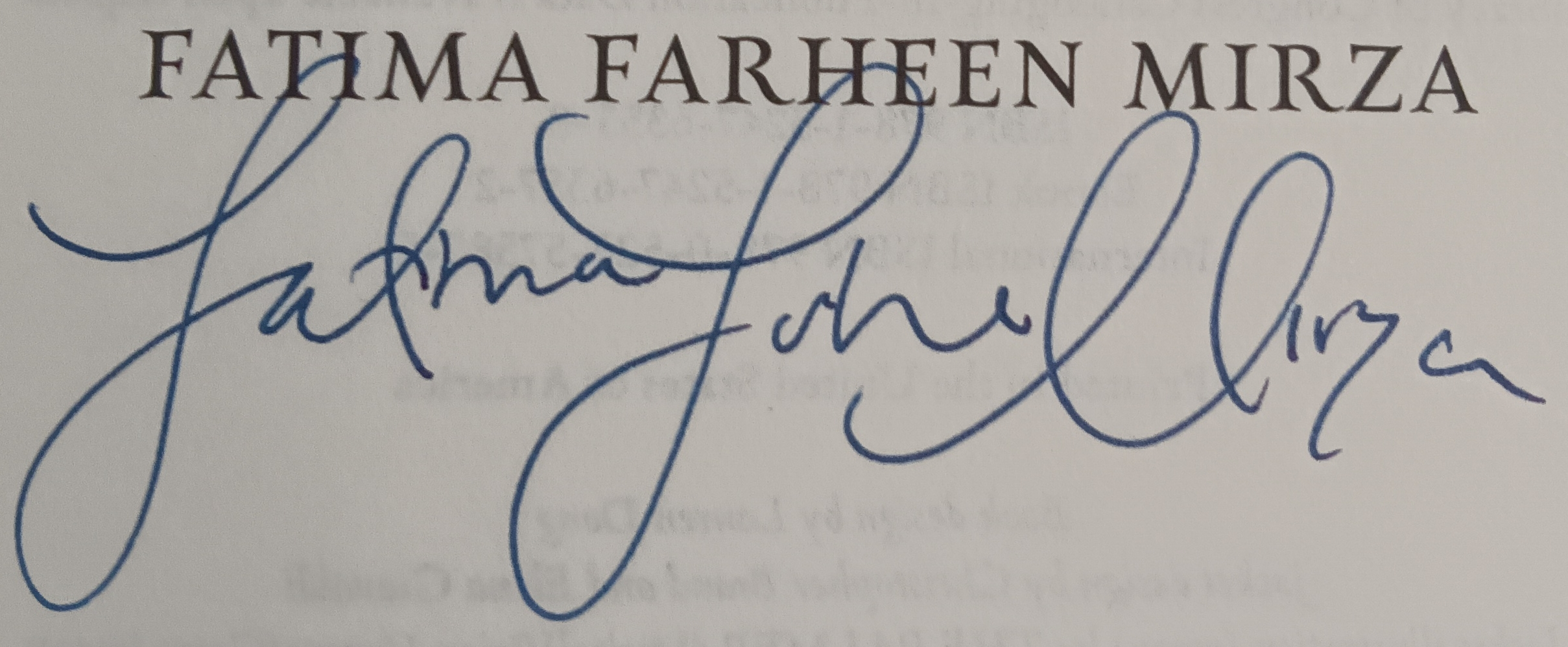

Fatima Farheen Mirza (Note: Hindustani pronunciation: [fɑː.t̪ɪ.ma fəɾ.ɦiːn mɪɾ.zɑː]) (born April 10, 1991) is an American novelist. She is best known for her novel A Place for Us (2018), which was a New York Times best seller. She was named by the National Book Award Foundation as a "5 Under 35" honoree in 2020.

== Early life and education ==
Mirza was born and raised in California. Her parents are both of Indian descent; her mother grew up to a British Indian family in Birmingham, England, while her father immigrated to the United States from Hyderabad. She grew up in an observant Muslim family.

Mirza attended the University of California, Riverside, where she pursued medical studies at first but made a career shift to creative writing as an undergraduate. She later graduated from the Iowa Writers' Workshop and received the Michener-Copernicus Fellowship. She has taught at the University of Iowa and New York University.

== Career ==
Mirza submitted the book manuscript for her debut novel A Place for Us for publication in 2017. The 400-page novel was the first book to be published by actor Sarah Jessica Parker's new imprint in collaboration with Crown Publishing Group, called SJP for Hogarth. A Place for Us took Mirza eight years to write, and explores the shifting dynamics in a Muslim immigrant family living in the States after having immigrated from Hyderabad, India. The novel was reviewed by the New York Times, the Los Angeles Review of Books, and The Washington Post. The book was a 2018 bestseller, and was named among the best books of 2018 by The Washington Post, Buzzfeed, and People magazine. She has been a guest on a number of podcasts celebrating her writing career such as Riff Raff, Books with Jen, Shalwar Kameez Dreams and Bridge India's Voices.

== Awards and honors ==
Mirza was nominated by author Tommy Orange as an honoree for the National Book Award Foundation's "5 Under 35" list.

== Personal life ==
Mirza married British actor Riz Ahmed in 2020 after meeting at a coffee shop in Brooklyn in 2018. In 2025, Ahmed revealed that Mirza had given birth to their first child.
