= John Blair (1890s footballer) =

Scottish footballer

Personal information
- Place of birth: Glasgow, Scotland
- Position: Centre-half

Senior career*
Years	Team	Apps	(Gls)
1894–1895	Glasgow Benburb		
1895–1896	Grimsby Town	1	(0)
1896–1897	Stalybridge Rovers		
1897–1898	Sheffield United	1	(0)
1898–1899	Gravesend United		
1899–1???	New Brompton		
- * Club domestic league appearances and goals

John Blair was a Scottish professional footballer who played as a centre-half.
