= John Blair (writer) =

American poet, novelist, and short story writer

- Born: 1961 (age 64–65); St. Petersburg, Florida, U.S.
- Education: Florida State University; Tulane University (PhD)
- Occupations: Poet; novelist; short story writer
- Children: 1
- Writing career
- Notable awards: Drue Heinz Literature Prize (2002)

John Blair (born 1961) is an American poet, novelist, and short story writer.

== Life ==
He was born in St. Petersburg, Florida. He graduated from Florida State University, and Tulane University, with a Ph.D.

His work appeared in Poetry, The Southern Review, Antioch Review, American Literature, The Georgia Review, The Sewanee Review, Shenandoah, Southern Poetry Review, Southern Humanities Review, Studies in the Novel and some three dozen other literary magazines and scholarly journals.

His books include several prize winning volumes, including American Standard, which won the prestigious Drue Heinz Literature Prize, The Green Girls, winner of the Lena Wever-Miles Poetry Award, The Occasions of Paradise, winner of the Tampa Review Prize in Poetry, and Playful Song Called Beautiful Winner of the prestigious Iowa Poetry Prize.

He is a University Distinguished Professor at Texas State University, where he directs the undergraduate creative writing program and teaches American Literature. He lives in Texas, with his wife and son.

== Awards ==
- 2002 Drue Heinz Literature Prize
- 2003 Lena-Miles Wever Todd Poetry Prize
- 2006 The Andrew Lytle Prize for Fiction
- 2007 Phoebe Winter Fiction Award
- 2008 Rumi Prize for Poetry
- 2010 The St. Petersburg Review Prize in Poetry
- 2012 The Tampa Review Prize in Poetry
- 2014 The Florida Review Editors' Prize in Poetry'
- 2014 The Tusculum Review Prize in Fiction
- 2015 The Dana Award in Poetry
- 2015 Iowa Poetry Prize
- 2016 Wilda Herne Prize for Fiction
- 2017 49th Parallel Award for Poetry
- 2017 Cultural Center of Cape Cod's National Prize for Poetry
- 2019 Connecticut River Review Poetry Award
- 2019 Julia Darling Memorial Poetry Prize
- 2019 Prize Americana for Prose
- 2020 Briar Cliff Review Poetry Prize
- 2021 Edwin Markham Prize in Poetry
- 2021 Rash Award in Poetry
- 2021 Robert Frost Award in Poetry
- 2022 Robinson Jeffers Tor House Prize in Poetry

== Bibliography ==
=== Poetry ===
Collections

- The green girls. LSU Press. 2003.
- The occasions of paradise. University of Tampa Press. 2012.
- Playful song called beautiful. University of Iowa Press. 2016.
- The shape of things to come : poems. Arlington, VA: Gival Press. 2023.

List of poems

Title	Year	First published	Reprinted/collected
Aubade for Ash Wednesday	2024	"Aubade for Ash Wednesday". 32 Poems. 43: 1‒2. Summer 2024.	
Ten thousand starlings dreaming	2024	"Ten thousand starlings dreaming". 32 Poems. 43: 3. Summer 2024.	

=== Novels ===
- A landscape of darkness. Ballantine Del Rey. 1990.
- Bright angel. Ballantine Del Rey. 1992.

=== Short fiction ===
Collections

- American standard. University of Pittsburgh Press. 2002.
