= Jane McCafferty =

American novelist

- Occupations: Novelist; short story writer
- Children: 2
- Writing career
- Notable awards: Drue Heinz Literature Prize (1992)

Jane McCafferty is an American novelist and short story writer.

== Life ==
Her stories have appeared in Alaska Quarterly Review, Seattle Review, Glimmer Train, Story, Witness. She teaches at Carnegie Mellon University. She lives in Pittsburgh, Pennsylvania and has two daughters.

== Awards ==
- National Endowment for the Arts Fellowship
- 1993 Great Lakes New Writers award
- 1992 Drue Heinz Literature Prize, for Director of the World

== Works ==
=== Novels ===
- One Heart. HarperCollins. 2000. ISBN 978-0-06-109757-7.
- First You Try Everything. New York: Harper, 2012

=== Short stories ===
- Thank You for the Music. HarperCollins. 2004. ISBN 978-0-06-056453-7.
- Director of the World. University of Pittsburgh Press. 1992. ISBN 978-0-8229-3729-6.

=== Anthologies ===
- Dinty W. Moore, ed. (2003). Sudden Stories: the Mammoth book of Miniscule Fiction. Mammoth Books. ISBN 978-0-9718059-5-8.
- Bill Henderson, ed. (2003). Pushcart prize XXVII: best of the small presses. Pushcart Press. ISBN 978-1-888889-35-2.
