= The Best American Short Stories 1948 =

1948 short story anthology

- Editor: Martha Foley
- Language: English
- Series: The Best American Short Stories
- Publisher: Houghton Mifflin Harcourt
- Media type: Print
- ISBN: 9789997371416
- Preceded by: The Best American Short Stories 1947
- Followed by: The Best American Short Stories 1949

The Best American Short Stories 1948 is a volume in The Best American Short Stories series edited by Martha Foley. The volume was published by Houghton Mifflin Harcourt.

== Background ==
The series is considered one of the "best-known annual anthologies of short fiction" and has anthologized more than 2,000 short stories, including works by some of the most famous writers in contemporary American literature.

In particular, the Willa Cather Review wrote that The Best American Short Stories series "became a repository of values" for creative writing programs, college libraries, and literary magazines. The Los Angeles Times, reflecting on the hundred-year anniversary of the series, noted that it eventually became an "institution" itself, often being taught in classrooms.

== Short stories included ==
Author	Story	Source
Sidney A. Alexander	"Part of the Act"	Story
Paul Bowles	"A Distant Episode"	Partisan Review
Ray Bradbury	"I See You Never"	The New Yorker
Dorothy Canfield	"The Apprentice"	Ladies' Home Journal
John Cheever	"The Enormous Radio"	The New Yorker
George R. Clay	"That's My Johnny-Boy"	Tomorrow
John Bell Clayton	"Visitor from Philadelphia"	Harper's Magazine
Margaret Cousins	"A Letter to Mr. Priest"	Good Housekeeping
M. F. K. Fisher	"The Hollow Heart"	'47-The Magazine of the Year
Philip Garrigan	"Fly, Fly, Little Dove"	Atlantic Monthly
Martha Gellhorn	"Miami-New York"	Atlantic Monthly
Elliot Grennard	"Sparrow's Last Jump"	Harper's Magazine
Ralph Gustafon	"The Human Fly"	Atlantic Monthly
John Hersey	"Why Were You Sent Out Here?"	Atlantic Monthly
Lance Jeffers	"The Dawn Swings In"	Mainstream
Victoria Lincoln	"Morning, a Week Before the Crime"	Cosmopolitan
Robert Lowry	"The Terror in the Streets"	Mademoiselle
John A. Lynch	"The Burden"	Atlantic Monthly
Vincent McHugh	"The Search"	'47-The Magazine of the Year
Robert Morse	"The Professor and the Puli"	Good Housekeeping
Ruth Portugal	"The Stupendous Fortune"	Good Housekeeping
Mary Brinker Post	"That's the Man!"	Today's Woman
Waverley Root	"Carmencita"	'47-The Magazine of the Year
Dolph Sharp	"The Tragedy in Jancie Brierman's Life"	Story
Wallace Stegner	"Beyond the Glass Mountain"	Harper's Magazine
Sidney Sulkin	"The Plan"	Kenyon Review
Eudora Welty	"The Whole World Knows"	Harper's Bazaar
E. B. White	"The Second Tree from the Corner"	The New Yorker
