= The Best American Short Stories 1947 =

1947 short story anthology

- Editor: Martha Foley
- Language: English
- Series: The Best American Short Stories
- Publisher: Houghton Mifflin Harcourt
- Media type: Print
- ISBN: 9789997371393
- Preceded by: The Best American Short Stories 1946
- Followed by: The Best American Short Stories 1948

The Best American Short Stories 1947 is a volume in The Best American Short Stories series edited by Martha Foley. The volume was published by Houghton Mifflin Harcourt.

== Background ==
The series is considered one of the "best-known annual anthologies of short fiction" and has anthologized more than 2,000 short stories, including works by some of the most famous writers in contemporary American literature.

In particular, the Willa Cather Review wrote that The Best American Short Stories series "became a repository of values" for creative writing programs, college libraries, and literary magazines. The Los Angeles Times, reflecting on the hundred-year anniversary of the series, noted that it eventually became an "institution" itself, often being taught in classrooms.

== Short stories included ==
Author	Story	Source
Francis L. Broderick	"Return by Faith"	Atlantic Monthly
Dorothy Canfield	"Sex Education"	Yale Review
Truman Capote	"The Headless Hawk"	Harper's Bazaar
Robert Fontaine	"Day of Gold and Darkness"	Yale Review
Adelaide Gerstley	"The Man in the Mirror"	Story
John B. L. Goodwin	"The Cocoon"	Story
John Mayo Goss	"Bird Song"	Atlantic Monthly
Paul Griffith	"The Horse Like September"	Tomorrow
Albert J. Guérard	"Turista"	Story
Elizabeth Hardwick	"The Golden Stallion"	The Sewanee Review
Ruth McCoy Harris	"Up the Road a Piece"	The Antioch Review
Thomas Heggen	"Night Watch"	Atlantic Monthly
Edward Harris Heth	"Under the Ginkgo Trees"	Town and Country
John Richard Humphreys	"Michael Finney and the Little Men"	Cosmopolitan
Victoria Lincoln	"Down in the Reeds by the River"	The New Yorker
Robert Lowry	"Little Baseball World"	Mademoiselle
May Davies Martenet	"Father Delacroix"	Quarterly Review of Literature
Jane Mayhall	"The Darkness"	Quarterly Review of Literature
J. F. Powers	"Prince of Darkness"	Accent
Samson Raphaelson	"The Greatest Idea in the World"	Good Housekeeping
Mark Schorer	"What We Don't Know Hurts Us"	Harper's Bazaar
Allan Seager	"Game Chickens"	Foreground
Irwin Shaw	"Act of Faith"	The New Yorker
Sylvia Shirley	"The Red Dress"	Harper's Magazine
Jean Stafford	"The Interior Castle"	Partisan Review
Irwin Stark	"Shock Treatment"	Commentary
Wallace Stegner	"The Women on the Wall"	Harper's Magazine
Niccolò Tucci	"The Siege"	Harper's Magazine
John D. Weaver	"Bread and Games"	Harper's Magazine
Lawrence Williams	"The Hidden Room"	Cosmopolitan
