= Lizzie Borden House =

House where Lizzie Borden and her family lived

Coordinates: 41.69894°N 71.15620°W

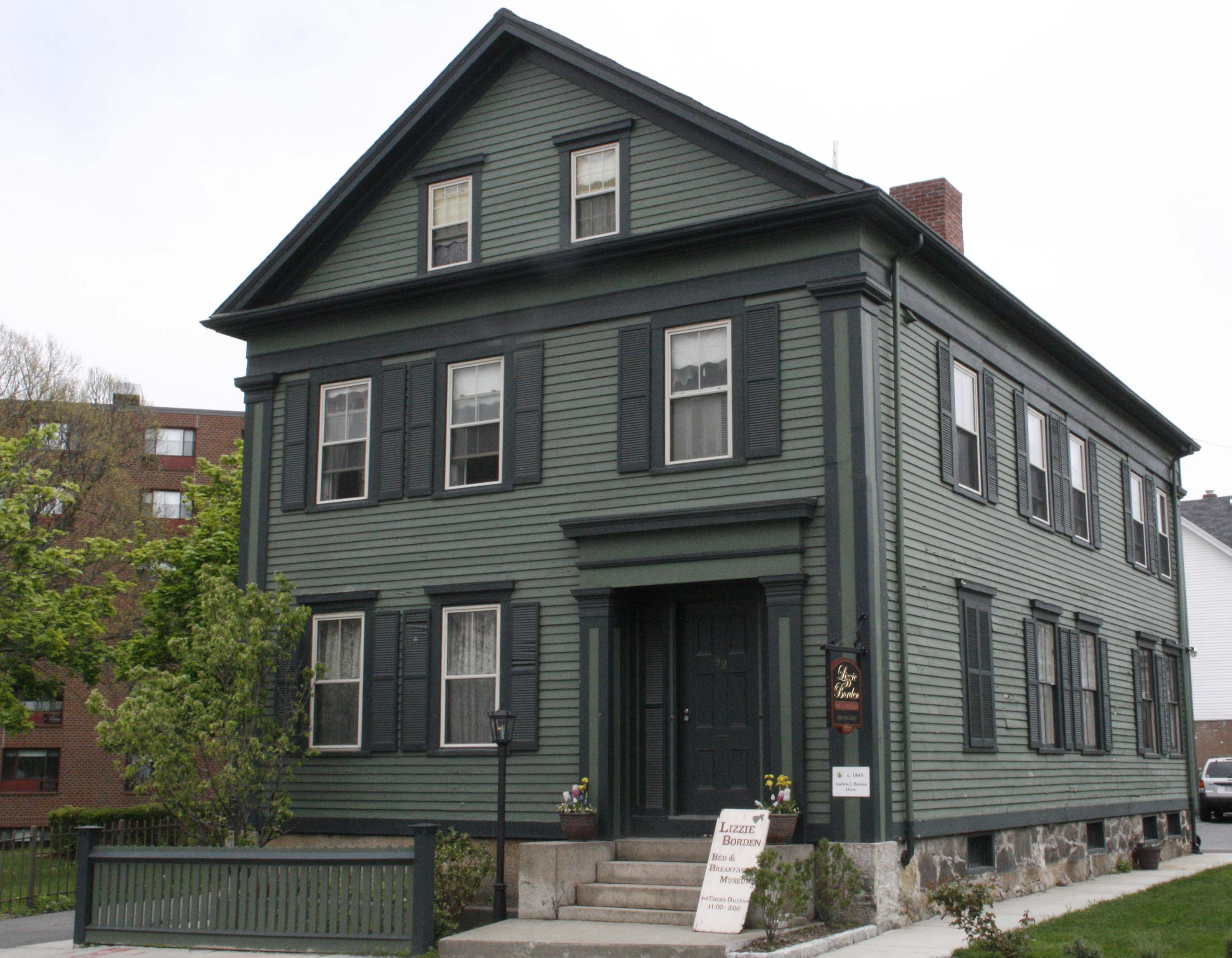
- The Borden house at 230 Second Street in 2009

General information
- Architectural style: Greek revival
- Location: 230 Second Street; Fall River, Massachusetts, United States
- Year built: 1845; 181 years ago
- Renovated: May 2021; 5 years ago
- Cost: $3,500 equivalent to $121,000 in 2025
- Owner: Lance Zaal

Technical details
- Material: Wood-frame
- Floor count: 3 + cellar
- Floor area: 3,900 square feet (360 m^{2})

Other information
- Public transit: MBTA Fall River station

Website
- lizzie-borden.com

The Lizzie Borden House is an American historic house, bed and breakfast, and museum in Fall River, Massachusetts, United States.. It is the former home of the Borden family, including Lizzie Borden and the location of the 1892 unsolved double murder of Andrew and Abby Borden. It is located on 230 Second Street, Fall River.

== History ==
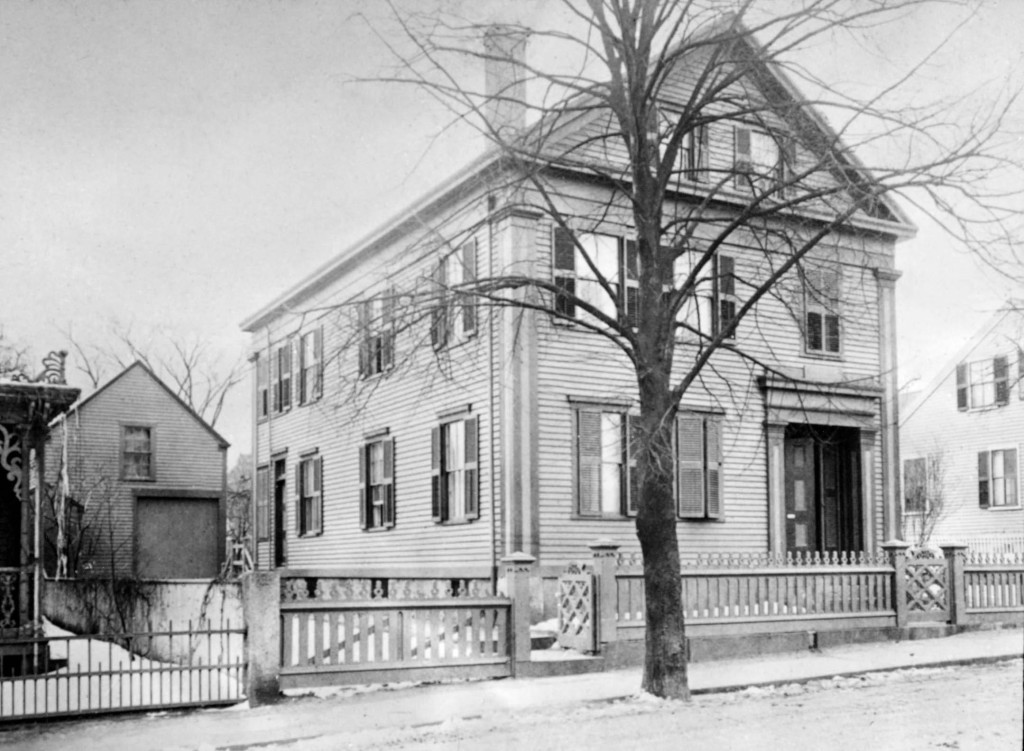
The Borden house at 92 Second Street in the late 1800s.

In 1845, the building was constructed as a two-unit residential building. It was purchased in 1872 by Andrew Borden and converted into a single-family residence. However, even after the remodeling, he still refused to install the newest technologies like indoor plumbing and electricity. He put a two-stall privy in the basement and a chamber pot under every bed. The house was considered middle class and was unusual for someone of his status to live in. Andrew Borden purchased it due to its proximity to his business on Main Street. He moved his four-person family (his wife, Abby, and his two daughters, Emma and Lizzie) into the home, as well as one maid who lived in the attic.

Under the ownership of Andrew Borden, it was quiet, with not many parties, as socialite Lizzie was too embarrassed to show her house to her wealthy friends. Abby and Andrew Borden relinquished their ownership upon their deaths to their daughters in 1892. After Lizzie's trial and acquittal for murdering her father and stepmother in the home, she bought another house located at 7 French Street that she named 'Maplecroft'. Lizzie lived there until her death on June 1, 1927. The house number of 92 Second Street was changed to 230 in 1896.

=== 1990s–present ===
It has operated as a bed and breakfast since 1996 under the ownership of Martha McGinn and Ronald Evans, who inherited the house. Martha's grandparents purchased the house on August 4, 1948. According to Martha McGinn, the room where Lizzie's stepmother, Abby Borden, was found murdered was the most requested room of the bedrooms at the bed and breakfast. The Fall River Historical Society promotes the Lizzie Borden Bed and Breakfast as a tourist attraction.

Donald Woods and Lee-Ann Wilbers then bought the house and kept it open for ninety-minute tours and bookings in 2004. Tour guides were only allowed to talk about the facts of the case and nothing else, but a Ouija board was available for use.

Many of the murder paraphernalia were put into the house during this time, including a mannequin in the guest room where Abby Borden was killed and autopsy photographs on the dining room table. Memorabilia from media inspired by the murder case were put into the house, such as photographs of actresses from the movie The Legend of Lizzie Borden. It is not known when they were installed, but bathrooms were eventually installed on the premises. Wilber stayed on the property as a custodian. She died four days after the sale of the house.

Tours of the house often refer to the possibility of ghostly activity, and in their book The Ghost Chronicles, self-proclaimed "medium" Maureen Wood and self-proclaimed "paranormal scientist" Ron Kolek describe experiencing ghostly events in the house. However, paranormal investigator Joe Nickell reports that these claims are based upon either unverifiable personal feelings of a ghostly presence or the use of well-known and well-understood techniques like table-tipping that, like Ouija board and dowsing rod effects, involve the ideomotor effect rather than the presence of a ghostly spirit.

The house was listed for sale in May 2021 and was sold to Lance Zaal for $2 million. Zaal stated he would keep the property operating as a bed and breakfast and hoped to expand the business to include other Lizzie-Borden-themed activities in the future. As the owner of the tour company US Ghost Adventures, his goals are to introduce two ghost tours (one ninety minutes and the other two hours) as well as keep the historical tours going. He also plans to implement "[...] a podcast, virtual experiences, themed dinners, bedtime ghost tours of Fall River, murder mystery nights", a wedding venue, and add a sixth bedroom to the property. Despite all this, Zaal has tried to keep the house "as is" with original furnishings, duplicated decor, and original hardware. A July 2021 article in Smithsonian indicated that he was planning to replace the iron stove with a more modern one, due to the risk it posed to residents. Zaal stays on the property like Wilber to keep an eye on the house.

== See also ==
- A. J. Borden Building
