= Tecumseh Mills =

- Tecumseh Mill No.1
- U.S. Historic district – Contributing property
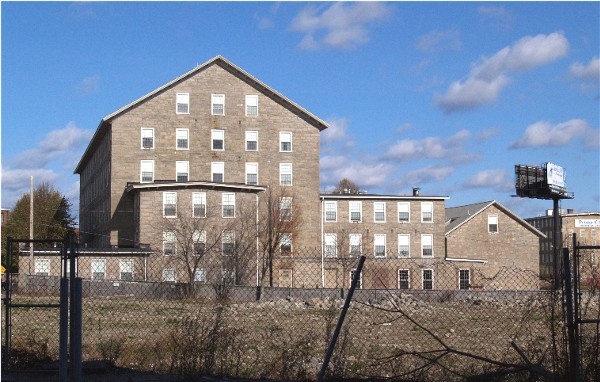

- Location within Massachusetts Location within the United States
- Location: Fall River, Massachusetts
- Coordinates: 41°41′49″N 71°9′9″W
- Built: 1866
- Part of: Corky Row Historic District (ID83000656)
- Designated CP: June 23, 1983

Tecumseh Mill No. 1 is a historic cotton mill located at 164 Hartwell Street in Fall River, Massachusetts. It was built in 1866, and added to the National Register of Historic Places in 1983 as part of the Corky Row Historic District. Tecumseh Mills No. 2 and No. 3 were located nearby on Plymouth Avenue, but have since been demolished.

== History ==
The Tecumseh Mills Company was organized in February 1866, by Augustus Chace and group of eighty-eight other investors. The steam-powered cotton mill was built on the banks of the Quequechan River. Built of locally quarried Fall River granite, it is 196 feet long by 72 feet wide, with 5-1/2 stories. It initially contained 20,480 spindles and 480 looms, and powered by a 400-hp Corliss engine.

In 1872, Mill No. 2 was built at a separate site at the corner of Eight Rod Way (now Plymouth Avenue) and Nashua Street. It began operation in 1873. Mill No. 3 was added in 1895, to the north of Mill No. 2 at the corner of Plymouth Avenue and Rodman Street. It was 310 feet long by 100 feet wide, with three stories. By 1917, the company operated 79,952 spindles and 1,698 looms. In 1924, it the Tecumseh Mills merged with the nearby Davol Mills, which operated until 1935. Mill No. 3 was later occupied by Mason's Furniture for many years (later Cabot House). It was demolished in the 1990s for construction of a Stop & Shop. Mill No. 2 was removed for a one-story structure that was also demolished for the supermarket.

Mill No. 1 was converted into apartments in the 1980s.

== See also ==
- List of mills in Fall River, Massachusetts
