= That Kind of Woman =

1959 film by Sidney Lumet

- Directed by: Sidney Lumet
- Screenplay by: Walter Bernstein
- Based on: "Layover in El Paso" (1944 story) by Robert Lowry
- Produced by: Marcello Girosi; Carlo Ponti
- Starring: Sophia Loren; Tab Hunter; George Sanders
- Cinematography: Boris Kaufman
- Edited by: Howard A. Smith
- Music by: Daniele Amfitheatrof
- Distributed by: Paramount Pictures
- Release dates: June 1959 (Berlin); September 11, 1959 (U.S.)
- Running time: 92 minutes
- Country: United States
- Language: English
- Budget: $2.5million
- Box office: $1 million (est. Only four months of US/Canada Rentals)

That Kind of Woman is a 1959 American drama film directed by Sidney Lumet, who was nominated for the Golden Bear at the 9th Berlin International Film Festival. It stars Sophia Loren and Tab Hunter. The screenplay by Walter Bernstein, based on a short story by Robert Lowry ("Layover in El Paso"), is highly reminiscent of the 1938 film The Shopworn Angel.

The Paramount Pictures release was filmed on location in New York City and Long Beach, New York.

Loren said the film “wasn’t much of a success, despite the fact that a great artist like Sidney Lumet directed it.”

== Plot ==
The film is set in New York City in June 1944, during World War II. Kay is a sophisticated Italian woman, the mistress of a Manhattan millionaire industrialist known simply as The Man, who uses her to help him influence his contacts at The Pentagon. While en route from Miami to New York City by train, she and her friend Jane meet a considerably younger American paratrooper named Red and his sergeant George Kelly, and Kay and Red fall into a romantic relationship. Eventually, the woman finds herself torn between her upscale life in a Sutton Place apartment and the prospect of true love with the GI.

== Principal cast ==
- Sophia Loren as Kay
- Tab Hunter as Red
- George Sanders as "The Man", A.L.
- Jack Warden as George Kelly
- Barbara Nichols as Jane
- Keenan Wynn as Harry Corwin

== Production ==
The film was based on Robert Lowry's 1945 short story, “Layover in El Paso,” which was published in a collection of his stories The Wolf That Fed Us (1945). The story was in a 1957 anthology of the best American short fiction written during the World War II years. Film rights were bought by Paramount.

The film was developed as a vehicle for Sophia Loren, who was under contract to Paramount. Sidney Lumet agreed to direct because he wanted to work with Loren. The location was shifted from Texas to New York.

Lumet recommended his friend, the blacklisted Walter Bernstein, to write the screenplay. Both Lumet and Bernstein warned Ponti that there might be problems with the House Un-American Activities Committee.

Lumet had worked with Hunter in television and suggested him for the male lead.

Filming took place completely in New York. The shoot started 23 June with two weeks at Gold Medal studios in the Bronx then location work. It was reportedly the most costly film ever shot in New York.

George Sanders later recalled, " We filmed it in 100-degree temperatures here in New York in a horrid little studio with no ventilation and on a stage which was not air-conditioned, and they had to keep my head wrapped in ice packs. Absolute agony, and all because the woman Sidney Lumet was married to refused to go to California, or something like that, so we had to sweat it out here.”

Loren's biographer said there was a clash of interpretation between Loren and Ponti, who wanted a romantic "woman's picture", and Lumet, who wanted something more realistic.

Lumet told Peter Bogdanovich he had a series of fights with the producers over the film's editing, about “Sophia [Loren]’s performance, largely. I fought like mad about the editing and the scoring on that, but the enmity between the producers and me was so total that they just went back to California and cut spitefully—to prove to me that certain scenes were not necessary. It got to that petty a level.”

== Reception ==
=== Box office ===
The movie was not a box office success. Tab Hunter later wrote in his memoirs:

There are lots of reasons why otherwise-good films fail at the box office, but bad timing and misleading marketing probably top the list. Paramount had cast me in the hope I'd attract a younger audience, which normally didn’t go for European films or stars. It also packaged the movie as a romantic comedy, which Ponti seemed to feel would be more palatable to U.S. audiences, especially in the wake of Loren’s success with her last picture, a comedy with Cary Grant called Houseboat. Sidney, however, had focused on the darker corners of the story, an approach reflected in the look of the film, best described as “neorealism comes to New York.”

=== Critical reception ===
Variety said the film had "several brilliant touches" but was "not satisfactory film drama... the tale, as it stands, is better suited to True Confessions that to serious filmmaking".

In his review in The New York Times, Bosley Crowther stated, "Walter Bernstein's screen play is a breezy, banal and bumptious thing, and Sidney Lumet has directed it with so many close-ups that it looks like a travesty of a 'silent' style."

Walter Bernstein wrote in his memoirs, "Tab, sweet and shy, with the weak good looks of many young leading men in the fifties, was just not in her [Loren's] league. He might hold his own with Sandra Dee; he was no match for Sophia. If they married, you knew who would carry whom over the threshold."

Lumet called it “not a bad picture; it had a kind of lovely atmosphere about it.”

Hunter said “I loved Sophia and consider Sidney Lumet one of the finest directors I’ve ever worked with. That Kind of Woman is a gem, still my favorite of all the films I’ve made.”

== Notes ==
- Harris, Warren J. (1998). Sophia Loren : a biography.
- Hunter, Tab (2006). Tab Hunter Confidential.
