= Lizzie Borden =

American woman acquitted of murder (1860–1927)

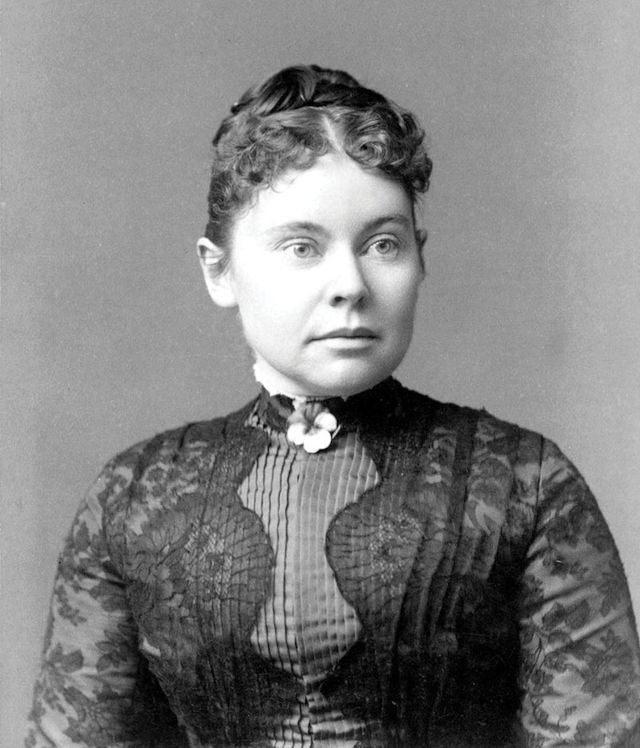
- Borden c. 1890
- Born: Lizzie Andrew Borden; July 19, 1860; Fall River, Massachusetts, U.S.
- Died: June 1, 1927 (aged 66); Fall River, Massachusetts, U.S.
- Resting place: Oak Grove Cemetery
- Other name: Lizbeth Borden
- Known for: Suspected homicide of father and stepmother

Lizzie Andrew Borden (July 19, 1860 – June 1, 1927) was an American woman who was tried and acquitted of the murders of her father and stepmother in Fall River, Massachusetts. No other individuals were charged with the murders.

After the trial, Borden and her older sister Emma bought a house in the wealthier Highlands, or Hill District, of Fall River, where Borden lived out her life. Emma moved away after twelve years and lived in New Hampshire. Borden died of pneumonia at age 66 on June 1, 1927, before her sister Emma who died 9 days later on June 10.

The Borden murders and 1893 trial received widespread publicity in the United States, and have remained a topic in American popular culture, inspiring numerous films, theatrical productions, literary works, and even folk rhymes.

== Early life ==
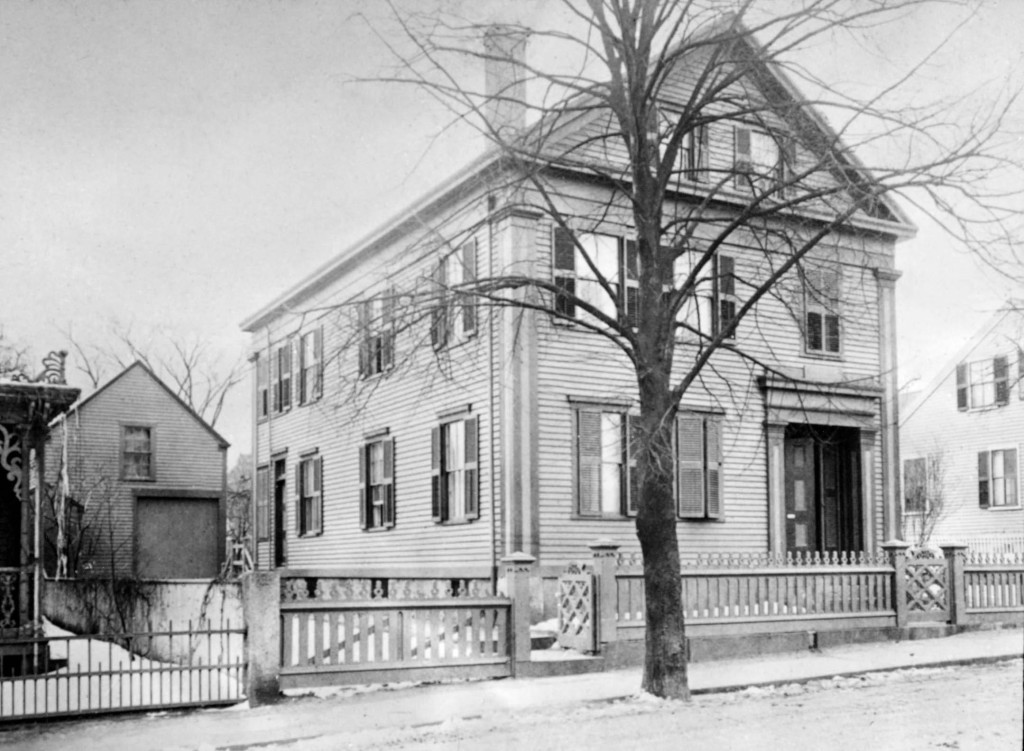
The Borden house at 92 Second Street in Fall River, Massachusetts 41°41′56″N 71°09′22″W

Lizzie Andrew Borden (Note: During the 1892 inquest over her father and stepmother's death, Lizzie stated that she had been christened as Lizzie, not Elizabeth.) was born on July 19, 1860, in Fall River, Massachusetts, to Sarah (Anthony) Borden (née Morse; 1823–1863) and Andrew Jackson Borden (1822–1892). She was the third child born to the couple; ahead of Lizzie were Emma Lenora and Alice Esther, who died of hydrocephalus at 22 months.

Their father, Andrew Borden, was of English and Welsh descent. He grew up in very modest surroundings and had struggled financially as a young man, despite being the descendant of a wealthy and influential family. He eventually prospered in the manufacture and sale of furniture and caskets, then became a successful property developer.

== Midlife ==
Borden's father became a director of several textile mills and owned considerable commercial property. He was also president of the Union Savings Bank and a director of the Durfee Safe Deposit and Trust Co. At the time of his murder, his estate was valued at $300,000 (equivalent to $10.8 million in 2025).

Despite his wealth, Borden was known for his frugality; the Borden residence still lacked indoor plumbing, even though it was common for the wealthy by then. The house stood in an affluent area, but immigrants were moving in and the wealthiest residents of Fall River generally lived in the more fashionable neighborhood called The Highlands, which was farther from the industrial areas of the city.

Lizzie and her sister Emma had a relatively religious upbringing and attended Central Congregational Church. As a young woman, Lizzie was very involved in church activities, including teaching Sunday school to children of recent immigrants. She was also involved in such religious organizations as the Christian Endeavor Society, for which she served as secretary-treasurer, and contemporary social movements such as the Woman's Christian Temperance Union. She was also a member of the Ladies' Fruit and Flower Mission.

Andrew Borden had married Abby Durfee Gray (1828–1892) three years after the death of Lizzie's mother, when his youngest daughter was six. Lizzie later said she called her stepmother "Mrs. Borden" and said she was unsure whether they had a cordial relationship. She long believed that Abby had married her father for his wealth.

By 1890, the Bordens had a live-in maid, Bridget Sullivan, a 25-year-old who had emigrated from Ireland. She testified at the 1893 trial that the adult sisters Lizzie and Emma rarely ate meals with their father and stepmother.

In May 1892, Andrew killed pigeons in his barn with a hatchet, believing that they carried infections and diseases. Lizzie had recently built a roost for the pigeons, and it has been commonly recounted that she was upset about him killing the birds, although the veracity of this has been disputed. (Note: Sarah Miller states in her 2016 book The Borden Murders: Lizzie Borden and the Trial of the Century that the account of Lizzie being profoundly upset over the deaths of the pigeons is unfounded and has become part of the myth surrounding her.) A family argument in July 1892 prompted both sisters to take extended vacations in New Bedford. They returned to Fall River and Lizzie chose to stay in a local rooming house for four days before returning to the Borden residence.

Other tension had been growing within the Borden family during 1892; the grown daughters resented Andrew's gifts of real estate to various branches of Abby's family. After their stepmother's half-sister received a house, Lizzie and Emma demanded a rental property, the house which they had lived in until their mother died; they purchased it from their father for one dollar. In July, they sold the property back to their father for $5,000 (equivalent to $179,000 in 2025).

John Vinnicum Morse, Lizzie and Emma's maternal uncle, visited the Borden home on August 3, 1892. Andrew invited him to stay for a few days to discuss business matters. This has led to speculation that their conversation may have aggravated an already tense situation within the family, particularly about property transfer.

The entire household had been violently ill for several days before his visit. A family friend later speculated that it was caused by mutton left on the stove to use in meals over several days. Abby had feared poison, given that Andrew was not a popular man in Fall River.

== Murders of Andrew and Abby ==
=== Thursday, August 4, 1892 ===
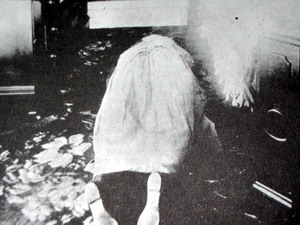
Abby Borden's body

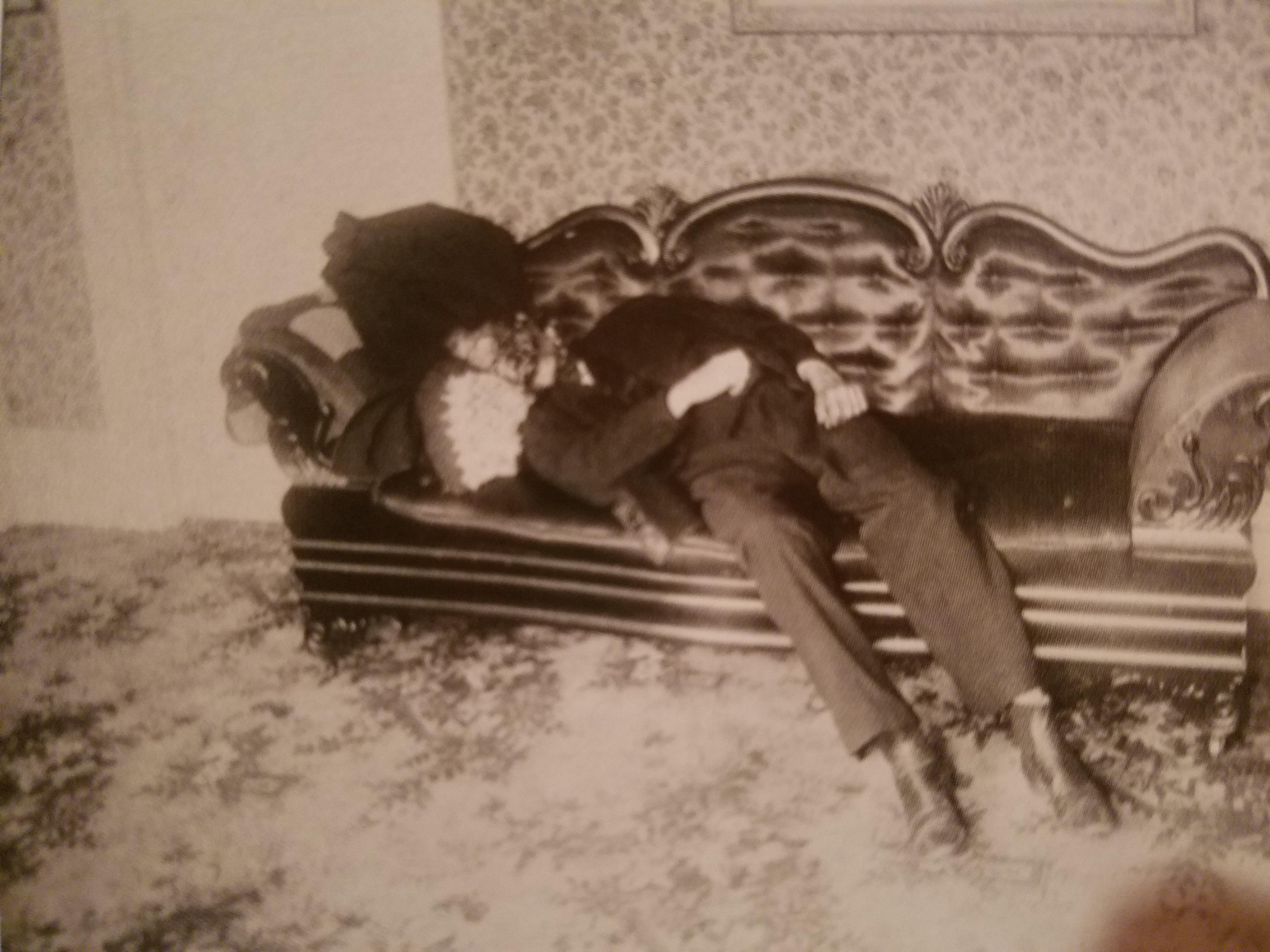
Andrew Borden's body

Morse arrived in the evening of August 3 and slept in the guest room that night. Andrew, Abby, Morse, and the maid Sullivan were present at breakfast the next morning, after which Andrew and Morse went to the sitting room, where they chatted for nearly an hour. Morse left around 8:48 am to buy a pair of oxen and visit a nephew and niece in Fall River. He planned to return to the Borden home for lunch at noon. Andrew left for his morning walk sometime after 9:00.

One of Lizzie and Emma's regular chores was to clean the guest room, but this morning Abby went upstairs sometime between 9:00 and 10:30 a.m. to make the bed. According to the forensic investigation, Abby was facing her killer at the time of the attack. She was first struck on the side of the head with a hatchet, which cut her just above the ear, causing her to turn and fall face down on the floor and creating contusions on her nose and forehead. Her killer struck her multiple times, delivering 17 more hits to the back of her head and killing her.

Andrew returned at around 10:30 a.m. His key failed to open the door, so he knocked. Sullivan went to unlock the door but found it jammed; she uttered a curse. She testified that she heard Lizzie laughing immediately after this; she did not see Lizzie, but stated that the laughter was coming from the top of the stairs. This was considered significant, as Abby was already dead by this time, and her body would have been visible to anyone on the second floor. Lizzie later denied being upstairs and testified that her father had asked her where Abby was, to which she replied that a messenger had delivered Abby a summons to visit a sick friend.

Lizzie stated that Andrew had removed his boots and put on his slippers before he lay down on the sofa, a detail contradicted by the crime-scene photos which show him wearing boots. Sullivan testified that she was in her third-floor room, resting from cleaning windows just before 11:10 am when she heard Lizzie call from downstairs, "Father's dead! Somebody's come in and killed him!"

Andrew was slumped on a couch in the downstairs sitting room, struck ten or eleven times with a hatchet-like weapon. One of his eyes had been split cleanly in two, suggesting that he had been asleep when attacked. His still-bleeding wounds suggested a very recent attack. Family physician Dr. Bowen arrived from his home across the street and pronounced both victims dead. Detectives estimated that Andrew's death had occurred at approximately 11:00 a.m.

=== Investigation ===
Lizzie's initial answers to the police officers' questions were at times strange and contradictory. Initially, she reported hearing a groan or a scraping noise or a distress call before entering the house. Two hours later, she told police that she had heard nothing and entered the house not realizing that anything was wrong. When they asked where her stepmother was, she recounted Abby receiving a note asking her to visit a sick friend. She also stated that she thought that Abby had returned and asked if someone could go upstairs and look for her. Sullivan and neighbor Mrs. Churchill were halfway up the stairs, their eyes level with the floor, when they looked into the guest room and saw Abby lying face down on the floor.

Most of the officers who interviewed Lizzie reported that they disliked her "attitude"; some said that she was too calm and poised. Marshal Hilliard told reporters that Lizzie struck him as "a very peculiar woman," while Officer Seaver stated his belief that the crime was the work of a person of unsound mind; Judge Blaisdell, called on to comment, noted that the central problem for investigators was "how could the deed be done by a woman." Despite her behavior and changing alibis, her hair and clothes were not checked by police. Police did search her room, but it was a cursory inspection; at the trial, they admitted to not doing a proper search because Lizzie was not feeling well. They were subsequently criticized for their lack of diligence.

In the basement, police found two hatchets, two axes, and a hatchet-head with a broken handle. The hatchet-head was suspected of being the murder weapon, as the break in the handle appeared fresh and the ash and dust on the head appeared to have been deliberately applied to make it look as if it had been in the basement for some time. However, none of these tools were removed from the house. Investigators also located a pail with what looked like bloody clothes or rags in the basement, though these were attributed by Borden to her menstruation, and the pail and its contents were inspected no further. The housekeeper, Bridget Sullivan, wondered why she had not seen the pail while doing the family's laundry earlier in the week, but by that time it had already been removed. The victims' stomachs were removed during autopsies and tested for poison because of the mysterious illness that had stricken the household before the murders, but no poison was found. Residents suspected Lizzie of purchasing "hydrocyanic acid in a diluted form" from the local druggist. Her defense was that she inquired about using the acid to clean her furs, despite the local medical examiner's testimony that it did not have antiseptic properties.

Lizzie and Emma's friend and next-door neighbor, Alice Russell, decided to stay with the sisters for nights following the murders.

Police were stationed around the house on the night of August 4, when an officer said he saw Lizzie enter the cellar with Russell, carrying a kerosene lamp and a slop pail. He stated that he saw both women exit the cellar, after which Lizzie returned alone. He could not see what she was doing, but he said she appeared to be bent over the sink.

On August 5, Morse left the Borden residence and was mobbed by hundreds of people; police had to escort him back to the house. The following day, police conducted a more thorough search of the house, inspecting the sisters' clothing and confiscating the broken-handled hatchet head. That evening, a police officer and the mayor visited the house, and Lizzie was informed that she was a suspect in the murders. According to Alice Russell's testimony, she had left and returned to the Borden house that Sunday morning to find Lizzie and her sister in the kitchen. Russell claimed that Lizzie was holding a skirt and said she was "going to burn this old thing up; it is covered with paint." It was never determined whether it was the dress that she had been wearing on the day of the murders.

=== Inquest ===
Lizzie appeared at the inquest hearing on August 8. The court then refused her request to have her family attorney present, citing a state statute requiring an inquest to be held in private. She had been prescribed regular doses of morphine to calm her nerves, and it is possible that her testimony was affected by this. Her behavior was erratic, and she often refused to answer a question even if the answer would be beneficial to her. She often contradicted herself and provided alternating accounts of the morning in question, such as saying that she was in the kitchen reading a magazine when her father arrived home, then saying that she was in the dining room doing some ironing, and then saying that she was coming down the stairs.

On August 11, Lizzie was served with a warrant of arrest and jailed. The inquest testimony, which forms the basis of the modern debate over Lizzie's guilt or innocence, was later ruled inadmissible at her trial in June 1893. Contemporaneous newspaper articles noted that Lizzie possessed a "stolid demeanor" and "bit her lips, flushed, and bent toward attorney Adams;" it was also reported that the testimony provided in the inquest had "caused a change of opinion among her friends who have heretofore strongly maintained her innocence." The inquest received significant press attention nationwide, including a three-page article in the Boston Globe. A grand jury began hearing evidence on November 7, and Borden was indicted on December 2.

=== Trial and acquittal ===
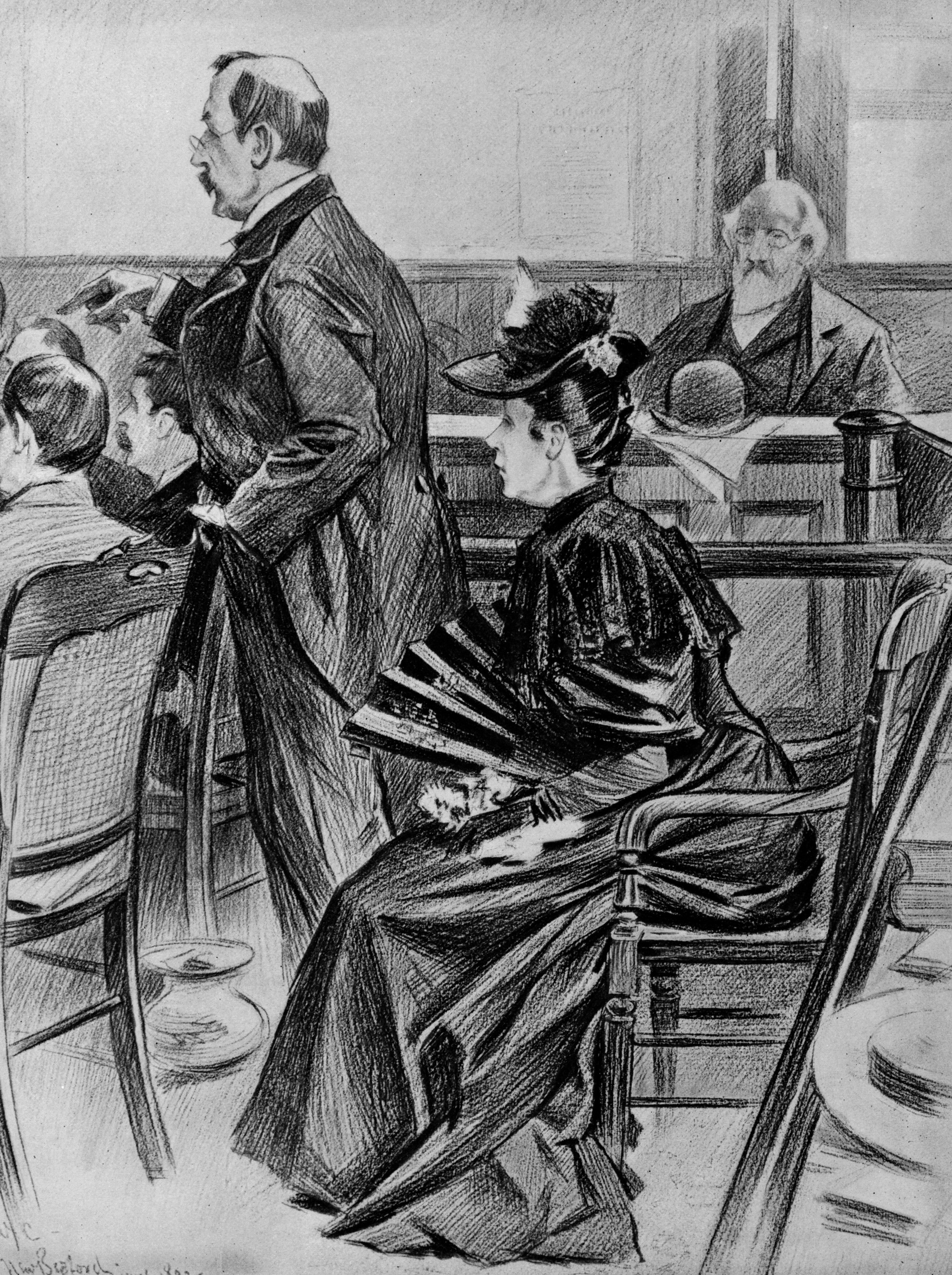
Lizzie Borden during the trial, by Benjamin West Clinedinst

Lizzie's trial took place in New Bedford starting on June 5, 1893. Prosecuting attorneys were Hosea M. Knowlton and future United States Supreme Court Justice William Henry Moody; defending were Andrew V. Jennings, Melvin O. Adams, and former Massachusetts governor George D. Robinson.

Another axe-murder occurred in Fall River on June 1, five days before Borden's trial began. This time, the victim was Bertha Manchester, who was found hacked to death in her kitchen. The similarities between the Manchester and Borden murders were striking and noted by jurors. Portuguese immigrant Jose Correa de Mello was convicted of Manchester's murder in 1894, but he was determined not to have been in the vicinity of Fall River at the time of the Borden murders.

A prominent point of discussion in the trial and press coverage was the hatchet-head found in the basement, which was not convincingly demonstrated by the prosecution to be the murder weapon. Prosecutors argued that the killer had removed the handle because it would have been covered in blood. One officer testified that a hatchet handle was found near the hatchet-head, but another officer contradicted this. No bloody clothing was found at the scene, but Russell testified that she had witnessed Lizzie burn a dress in the kitchen stove on August 8, 1892, saying that it had been ruined when she brushed against wet paint. During the course of the trial, the defense never attempted to challenge this statement.

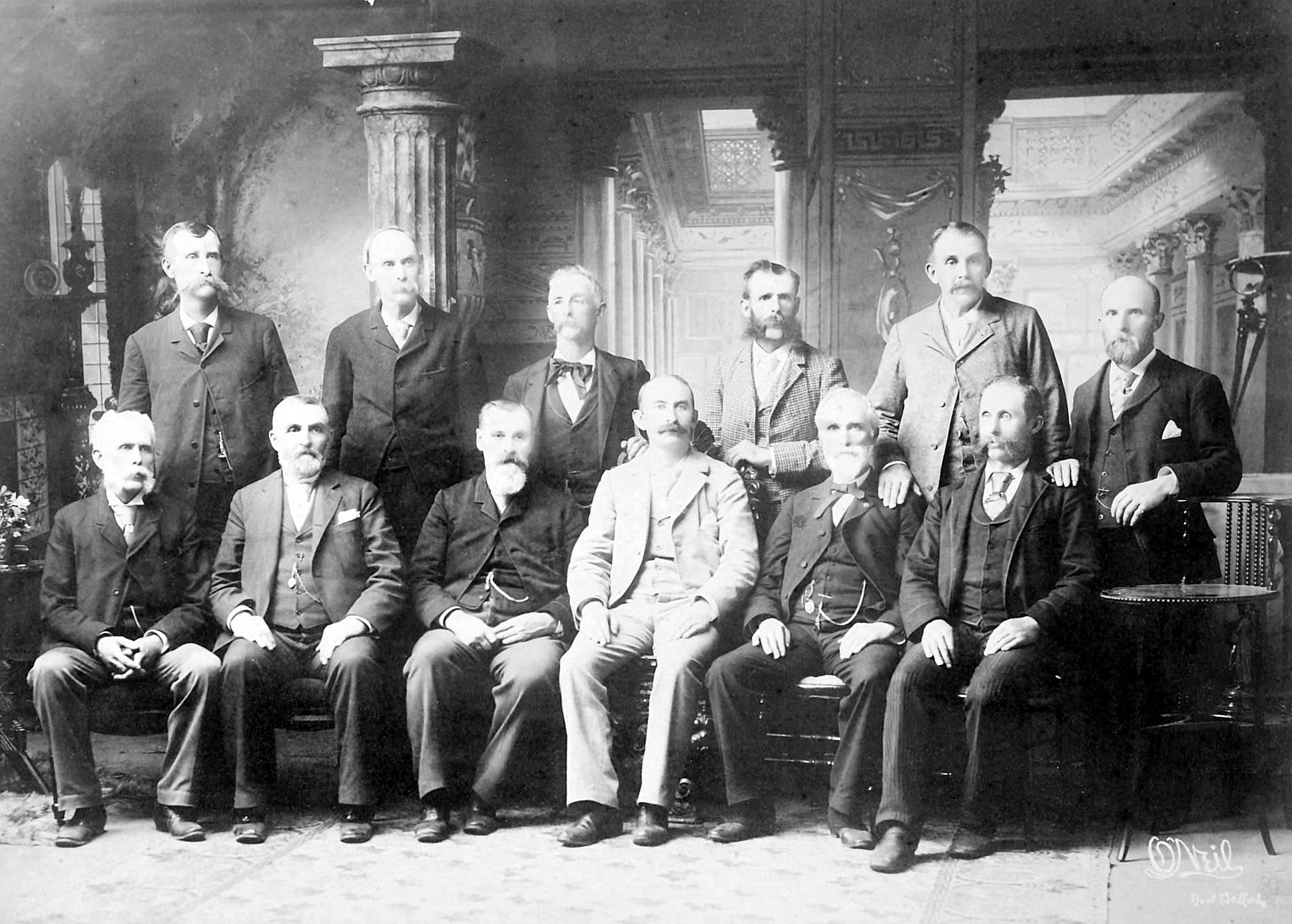
The trial jury that acquitted Borden, 1893

Lizzie's presence at the home was also disputed during the trial. According to testimony, Sullivan entered the second floor at around 10:58 a.m. and left Lizzie and her father downstairs. Lizzie told several people that she went into the barn and was not in the house for "twenty minutes or possibly a half an hour". Hyman Lubinsky testified for the defense that he saw Lizzie leaving the barn at 11:03 am, and Charles Gardner confirmed the time. At 11:10 am, Lizzie called Sullivan downstairs, told her that Andrew had been murdered, and ordered her not to enter the room; instead, Lizzie sent her to get a doctor.

Both victims' heads had been removed during autopsy, and the skulls were admitted as evidence during the trial and presented on June 5, 1893. Upon seeing them in the courtroom, Lizzie fainted. Evidence was excluded that she had sought to purchase prussic acid (hydrogen cyanide) from the local druggist on the day before the murders, purportedly for cleaning a sealskin cloak. The judge ruled that the incident was too remote in time to have any connection.

Presiding Associate Justice Justin Dewey had been appointed by Robinson as governor, and he delivered a lengthy summary supporting the defense before the jury was sent to deliberate on June 20, 1893. Contemporary newspaper accounts reported that the jury reached its verdict in just 40 minutes on a single ballot, though some later accounts put deliberations at an hour and a half; the jury acquitted Lizzie Borden of the murders. Upon exiting the courthouse, she told reporters that she was "the happiest woman in the world".

The trial has been compared to the later trials of Bruno Hauptmann, Ethel and Julius Rosenberg, and O.J. Simpson as a landmark in publicity and public interest in the history of American legal proceedings.

=== Theories ===
==== Lizzie Borden ====
Although acquitted at trial, Lizzie remained the prime suspect in her father's and stepmother's murders. Writer Victoria Lincoln proposed in 1967 that she might have committed the murders while in a fugue state. Another prominent suggestion was that she was physically and sexually abused by her father, which drove her to kill him. There is little evidence to support this, but incest is not a topic that would have been discussed at the time, and the methods for collecting physical evidence would have been quite different in 1892. This belief was intimated in local papers at the time of the murders, and was revisited by scholar Marcia Carlisle in a 1992 essay.

Mystery author Evan Hunter, better known as Ed McBain, in his 1984 novel Lizzie, suggested that Lizzie committed the murders after being caught in a tryst with Sullivan. McBain elaborated on his speculation in a 1999 interview, speculating that Abby had caught the two together and had reacted with horror and disgust, and that Lizzie had killed Abby with a candlestick, then made a confession to Andrew when he returned home but killed him in a rage with a hatchet when he reacted exactly as Abby had. He further speculated that Sullivan disposed of the hatchet somewhere afterwards.

In her later years, Lizzie was rumored to be a lesbian, but there was no such speculation about Sullivan, who later married a man she met while working as a maid in Butte, Montana. Sullivan died in Butte in 1948. Allegedly, she gave a death-bed confession to her sister in which she stated that she had changed her testimony on the stand to protect Lizzie. This allegation has been contradicted, as "The informant of her death was the County Hospital, not an individual."

==== John Morse ====
Another significant suspect is John Morse, Lizzie's maternal uncle, who rarely met with the family after his sister died but had slept in the house the night before the murders; according to law enforcement, he had provided an "absurdly perfect and over-detailed alibi for the death of Abby Borden". Morse was considered a suspect by police for a period.

==== "William Borden" ====
A man named William Borden, suspected to be Andrew's illegitimate son, was noted as a possible suspect by author Arnold Brown, who surmised that William had tried and failed to extort money from his alleged father. Author Leonard Rebello, after extensive research on William, proved he was not Andrew's son.

==== Emma Borden ====
Although Emma had an alibi at Fairhaven, about 15 miles (24 km) from Fall River, crime writer Frank Spiering proposed in his 1984 book Lizzie that she might have secretly visited the residence to kill her parents before returning to Fairhaven in time to receive the telegram informing her of the murders.

== Later life ==
After the trial, the Borden sisters moved into a large, modern house in The Hill neighborhood in Fall River. Around this time, Lizzie began using the name Lizbeth A. Borden. At their new house, which Lizbeth dubbed "Maplecroft", they had a staff that included live-in maids, a housekeeper and a coachman. Because Abby was ruled to have died before Andrew, her estate went first to Andrew and then, at his death, passed to his daughters as part of his estate. A considerable settlement was paid to settle claims by Abby's family.

Despite the acquittal, Lizbeth was ostracized by Fall River society. Her name was again brought into the public eye when she was accused of shoplifting in Providence, Rhode Island, in 1897. In 1905, shortly after an argument over a party that Lizbeth had given for actress Nance O'Neil, Emma moved out of the house and never saw her sister again.

== Death ==
Following the removal of her gallbladder, Lizzie was ill the last year of her life. At age 66, she died of pneumonia on June 1, 1927, in Fall River. Funeral details were not published and few attended. Emma died nine days later at a nursing home in Newmarket, New Hampshire. She was 76, and had been suffering from chronic nephritis. Lizzie and Emma never married and were buried side by side in the family plot at Oak Grove Cemetery in Fall River.

At the time of her death in 1927, Borden was worth over $250,000 (equivalent to $6,200,000 in 2025). She owned a house on the corner of French Street and Belmont Street, several office buildings, shares in several utilities, two cars and a large amount of jewelry. She left $30,000 (equivalent to $750,000 in 2025) to the Fall River Animal Rescue League and $500 ($12,000) in trust for perpetual care of her father's grave. Her closest friend and a cousin each received $6,000 ($150,000 in 2025)—substantial sums at the time of the estate's distribution in 1927—and numerous friends and family members each received between $1,000 ($25,000 in 2025) and $5,000 ($120,000 in 2025).

== In culture ==
Scholar Ann Schofield notes that "Borden's story has tended to take one or the other of two fictional forms: the tragic romance and the feminist quest ... As the story of Lizzie Borden has been created and re-created through rhyme and fiction it has taken on the qualities of a popular American myth or legend that effectively links the present to the past."

The Borden house became a museum, and operates a bed and breakfast with 1890s styling. Pieces of evidence used in the trial, including the hatchet-head, are preserved at the Fall River Historical Society.

=== Folk rhyme ===
The case was memorialized in a popular skipping-rope rhyme, sung to the tune of the then-popular song "Ta-ra-ra Boom-de-ay."

Lizzie Borden took an axe
and gave her mother forty whacks.
When she saw what she had done,
she gave her father forty-one.

Folklore says that the rhyme was made up by an anonymous writer as a tune to sell newspapers. Others attribute it to the ubiquitous, but anonymous, "Mother Goose".

In reality, Lizzie's stepmother suffered 18 or 19 blows; her father suffered 11 blows.

The rhyme has a less well-known second verse:

Andrew Borden now is dead,
Lizzie hit him on the head.
Up in heaven he will sing,
on the gallows she will swing.

=== Depictions ===
Lizzie Borden has been depicted in music, radio, film, theater, and television, often in association with the murders of which she was acquitted.

Among the earlier portrayals on stage was John Colton and Carleton Miles's 1933 play Nine Pine Street, in which Lillian Gish played Effie Holden, a character who is based on Borden. The play was not a success and ran for only twenty-eight performances. In 1947 Lillian de la Torre wrote a one-act play, Goodbye, Miss Lizzie Borden.

Other retellings include New Faces of 1952, a 1952 Broadway musical with a number titled Lizzie Borden, which depicts the crimes, as well as Agnes de Mille's ballet Fall River Legend (1948) and the Jack Beeson opera Lizzie Borden (1965), both works being based on Borden and the murders of her father and stepmother. Other plays based on Borden include Blood Relations (1980), a Canadian production written by Sharon Pollock that recounts events leading up to the murders, which was made into a television movie in Calgary. Lizzie Borden, another musical adaptation, was also made starring Tony nominee Alison Fraser.

A March 24, 1957, episode of Omnibus presented two different adaptations of the Lizzie Borden story: the first a play, "The Trial of Lizzie Borden", with Katharine Bard as Lizzie; the second a production of the Fall River Legend ballet with Nora Kaye as "The Accused". In 1959, The Legend of Lizzie by Reginald Lawrence attracted praise for Anne Meacham in the title role, but still closed after just two performances.

A January 21, 1956, episode of Alfred Hitchcock Presents, entitled "The Older Sister", presents a fictionalized account, occurring one year after the murders, where Emma is revealed as being the murderer.

The folk singing group The Chad Mitchell Trio recorded a black comedy song, Lizzie Borden by Michael Brown, for their live 1961 album Mighty Day on Campus. Released as a single, it reached #44 on the Billboard Hot 100 chart in 1962.

American Broadcasting Company commissioned The Legend of Lizzie Borden (1975), a television film starring Elizabeth Montgomery as Lizzie Borden, Katherine Helmond as Emma Borden, and Fionnula Flanagan as Bridget Sullivan; it was later discovered after Montgomery died that she and Borden were in fact sixth cousins once removed, both descending from 17th century Massachusetts resident John Luther. Rhonda McClure, the genealogist who documented the Montgomery-Borden connection, said: "I wonder how Elizabeth would have felt if she knew she was playing her own cousin."

Lizzie: The Musical premiered in 2009, with book by Tim Maner, music by Steven Cheslik-deMeyer and Alan Stevens Hewitt, and lyrics by Cheslik-deMeyer and Maner. The musical had its origins in a 1990 song cycle, and focuses on a secret romance between Borden and her neighbour, Alice, as well as her abuse at home.

Lifetime produced Lizzie Borden Took an Ax (2014), a speculative television film with Christina Ricci portraying Borden, which was followed by The Lizzie Borden Chronicles (2015)—a limited series and a sequel to the television film, which presents a fictionalized account of Borden's life after the trial. A feature film, Lizzie (2018), with Chloë Sevigny as Borden and Kristen Stewart as Bridget Sullivan, depicts a lesbian tryst between Borden and Sullivan, which leads to the murders.

The events of the murders and the trial have been reenacted on a number of documentary programs. In 1936, the radio program Unsolved Mysteries broadcast a 15-minute dramatization titled "The Lizzie Borden Case", which presented a possible scenario in which the murders were committed during a botched robbery attempt by a tramp, who then escaped. Television recreations have included episodes of Biography, Second Verdict, History's Mysteries, Case Reopened (1999), and Mysteries Decoded (2019). The Lizzie Borden case was partly dramatized on an episode of the 2022 BBC Radio podcast series Lucy Worsley's Lady Killers.

Lizzy Borden, an American heavy metal band, is named after her. Additionally, the American thrash metal band Flotsam and Jetsam recorded the song "She Took an Axe" for their 1986 debut album, Doomsday for the Deceiver. Co-written by future Metallica bassist Jason Newsted, the track features a narrative retelling of the Fall River murders and directly incorporates the traditional folk rhyme into its bridge and chorus. The American film director Lizzie Borden also took her name from the historical figure.

Borden is the focus of the fourth season of the true crime anthology series Monster, in which she is portrayed by Ella Beatty. The season began streaming on Netflix on September 17, 2026.

=== In literature ===
- In Agatha Christie's mystery novel Sleeping Murder, the main character Miss Marple says that murder "was not proven in the case of Madeleine Smith and Lizzie was acquitted‍—‌but many people believe both of those women were guilty." Christie's And Then There Were None, After the Funeral, and Ordeal by Innocence also reference the case.
- "The Fall River Axe Murders", a short story by Angela Carter, was published in her collection Black Venus (1985). "Lizzie's Tiger", also by Carter, depicts Borden, imagined as a four-year-old, having an extraordinary encounter at the circus. The story was published posthumously in 1993 in her collection American Ghosts and Old World Wonders.
- Davidson, Avram. "The Deed of the Deft-Footed Dragon" in several collections, most recently The Other Nineteenth Century, ed. Grania Davis and Henry Wessels. New York; TOR, 2001.
- de Mille, Agnes. Lizzie Borden: A Dance of Death. Boston: Little, Brown and Co., 1968.
- Miss Lizzie, a 1989 novel by Walter Satterthwait, takes place thirty years after the murders and recounts an unlikely friendship between Borden and a child, and the suspicions that arise from a murder.
- Maplecroft: The Borden Dispatches, a 2014 novel by Cherie Priest. The first in a series of novels, where Priest adds elements of Lovecraftian horror to the tale of Lizzie Borden.
- See What I Have Done, 2017 novel by Australian writer Sarah Schmidt, tells the story of the murders and their aftermath from the points of view of Lizzie and Emma Borden, Bridget Sullivan, and an imagined stranger. It won the MUD Literary Prize for a debut novel.
- Erika Mailman's 2017 novel The Murderer's Maid is told from the points of view of Bridget Sullivan in 1892 and a young woman with a connection to the case in the modern day. It won a gold medal for historical fiction in the Independent Publisher Book Awards.

== See also ==
- A. J. Borden Building
- Corky Row Historic District
- List of unsolved murders (before 1900)

== Works cited ==
- Bartle, Ronald (2017). Lizzie Borden and the Massachusetts Axe Murders. Sherfield-on-Loddon, Hampshire: Waterside Press. ISBN 978-1-909-97643-6.
- Chiasson, Lloyd Jr. (1997). The Press on Trial: Crimes and Trials as Media Events. Westport, CT: Greenwood Press. ISBN 978-0-313-30022-6.
- Brown, Arnold (1991). Lizzie Borden: The Legend, the Truth, the Final Chapter. Nashville, TN: Rutledge Hill Press. ISBN 978-1-558-53099-7.
- Douglas, John E.; Olshaker, Mark (2001). The Cases That Haunt Us: From Jack the Ripper to Jon Benet Ramsey, The FBI's Legendary Mindhunter Sheds New Light on the Mysteries That Won't Go Away. Simon and Schuster. ISBN 978-0-7432-1239-7.
- Green, Kay, ed. (1996). Broadway Musicals, Show by Show. Milwaukee: Hal Leonard Corporation. ISBN 978-0-793-57750-7.
- Hoffman, Paul Dennis (2000). Yesterday in Old Fall River: A Lizzie Borden Companion. Durham, NC: Carolina Academic Press. ISBN 978-0-890-89799-7.
- Holmes, Ronald M.; Holmes, Stephen T. (2008). Profiling Violent Crimes: An Investigative Tool (4th ed.). Sage Publications. ISBN 978-1-452-27681-6.
- Fanthorpe, R. Lionel; Fanthorpe, Patricia (2003). The World's Most Mysterious Murders. Dundurn. ISBN 978-1-55002-439-5.
- Katz, Hélèna (2010). Cold Cases: Famous Unsolved Mysteries, Crimes, and Disappearances in America. Santa Barbara, CA: ABC-CLIO. ISBN 978-0-313-37692-4.
- Kent, David (1992). Forty Whacks: New Evidence in the Life and Legend of Lizzie Borden (1st ed.). Emmaus, PA: Yankee Books. ISBN 978-0-89909-351-2.
- Kent, David; Flynn, Robert A., eds. (1992). The Lizzie Borden Sourcebook. Wellesley, MA: Branden Books. ISBN 978-0-8283-1950-8.
- King, Florence (1996). The Florence King Reader. Macmillan. ISBN 978-0-312-14337-4.
- King, Florence. WASP, Where is Thy Sting? Chapter 15, "One WASP's Family, or the Ties That Bind." Stein & Day, 1977, ISBN 0-552-99377-8 (1990 Reprint ed.).
- Knox, Sara L. (1998). Murder: A Tale of Modern American Life. Durham, NC: Duke University Press. ISBN 978-0-8223-2053-1.
- Lincoln, Victoria (1967). A Private Disgrace: Lizzie Borden by Daylight (Book Club ed.). New York: G.P. Putnam's Sons. ISBN 978-0-930330-35-4.
- Masterton, William L. Lizzie Didn't Do It! Boston: Branden Publishing Company, 2000, ISBN 0-8283-2052-7.
- Miller, Sarah (2016). The Borden Murders: Lizzie Borden and the Trial of the Century. New York: Random House. ISBN 978-0-553-49808-0.
- Miller, Wilbur R., ed. (2012). The Social History of Crime and Punishment in America: An Encyclopedia. Sage Publications. ISBN 978-1-4129-8876-6.
- Newton, Michael (2009). The Encyclopedia of Unsolved Crimes. New York: Infobase Publishing. ISBN 978-1-438-11914-4.
- Pearson, Edmund Lester. Studies in Murder Ohio State University Press, 1924.
- Pearson, Edmund (1937). Trial of Lizzie Borden, edited, with a History of the Case. New York: Doubleday-Doran. OCLC 20790872.
- Philbin, Tom; Philbin, Michael (2011). The Killer Book of Infamous Murders: Incredible Stories, Facts, and Trivia from the World's Most Notorious Murders. Sourcebooks, Inc. ISBN 978-1-4022-3746-1.
- Porter, Edwin H. (2006) [1893]. The Fall River Tragedy: A History of the Borden Murders. Clark, NJ: The Lawbook Exchange, Ltd. ISBN 978-1-584-77546-1.
- Radin, Edward D. Lizzie Borden: The Untold Story Simon and Schuster, 1961.
- Rebello, Leonard (1999). Lizzie Borden: Past & Present (1st ed.). Fall River, Massachusetts: Al-Zach Press. ISBN 978-0-9670739-0-3.
- Robbins, Trina (2003). Tender Murderers: Women Who Kill. York Beach, Maine: Conari Press. ISBN 978-1-57324-821-1.
- Schmidt, Sarah (2017). See What I Have Done. Atlantic Monthly Press. ISBN 978-0-802126597.
- Schofield, Ann (1993). "Lizzie Borden Took an Axe: History, Feminism and American Culture". American Studies. 34 (1): 91–103. ISSN 0026-3079. JSTOR 40642497.
- Scott, Gini Graham (2005). Homicide By The Rich And Famous: A Century Of Prominent Killers. Greenwood Publishing Group. ISBN 978-0-275-98346-8.
- Spiering, Frank (1984). Lizzie (1st ed.). New York: Dorset Press. ISBN 978-0-88029-685-4.
- Williams, Joyce; Smithburn, J. Eric; Peterson, M. Jeanne, eds. (1981). Lizzie Borden, a Case Book of Family and Crime in the 1890s. Bloomington, IN: T.I.S. Publications Division. ISBN 978-0-89917-302-3.
- Verstraete, C.A. (2018). Lizzie Borden, Zombie Hunter. CreateSpace Independent Publishing Platform. ISBN 978-1717351654.
