= The Best American Short Stories 1949 =

1949 short story anthology

- Editor: Martha Foley
- Language: English
- Series: The Best American Short Stories
- Publisher: Houghton Mifflin Harcourt
- Media type: Print
- ISBN: 978-9997371447
- Preceded by: The Best American Short Stories 1948
- Followed by: The Best American Short Stories 1950

The Best American Short Stories 1949 is a volume in The Best American Short Stories series edited by Martha Foley. The volume was published by Houghton Mifflin Harcourt.

== Background ==
The series is considered one of the "best-known annual anthologies of short fiction" and has anthologized more than 2,000 short stories, including works by some of the most famous writers in contemporary American literature.

In particular, the Willa Cather Review wrote that The Best American Short Stories series "became a repository of values" for creative writing programs, college libraries, and literary magazines. The Los Angeles Times, reflecting on the hundred-year anniversary of the series, noted that it eventually became an "institution" itself, often being taught in classrooms.

== Short stories included ==
Author	Story	Source
George Albee	"Mighty, Mighty Pretty"	Story
Livingston Biddle, Jr.	"The Vacation"	Cosmopolitan Magazine
Elizabeth Bishop	"The Farmer's Children"	Harper's Bazaar
Paul Bowles	"Under the Sky"	Partisan Review
Frank Brookhouser	"My Father and the Circus"	University of Kansas City Review
Borden Deal	"Exodus"	Tomorrow Magazine
Adele Dolokhov	"Small Miracle"	Today's Woman
Ward Dorrance	"The White Hound"	The Hudson Review
Henry Gregor Felsen	"Li Chang's Million"	Woman's Day Magazine
Robert Gibbons	"Departure of Hubbard"	Tomorrow Magazine
Beatrice Griffith	"In the Flow of Time"	Common Ground
Elizabeth Hardwick	"Evenings at Home"	Partisan Review
Joseph Heller	"Castle of Snow"	The Atlantic Monthly
Ruth Herschberger	"A Sound in the Night"	Harper's Bazaar
Laura Hunter	"Jerry"	Mademoiselle
Jim Kjelgaard	"Of the River and Uncle Pidcock"	Adventure
Roderick Lull	"Footnote to American History"	The Virginia Quarterly Review
T. D. Mabry	"The Vault"	The Kenyon Review
Agnes Macdonald	"Vacia"	Accent
Jane Mayhall	"The Men"	Perspective
Patrick Morgan	"The Heifer"	The Atlantic Monthly
Irving Pfeffer	"All Prisoners Here"	Harper's Magazine
John Rogers	"Episode of a House Remembered"	Wake
J. D. Salinger	"A Girl I Knew"	Good Housekeeping
Alfredo Segre	"Justice Has No Number"	Ellery Queen's Mystery Magazine
Madelon Shapiro	"An Island For My Friends"	Bard Review
Jean Stafford	"Children Are Bored on Sunday"	The New Yorker
Jessamyn West	"Road to the Isles"	The New Yorker
