= Davol Mills =

Historic building in Fall River, Massachusetts

- U.S. Historic district – Contributing property
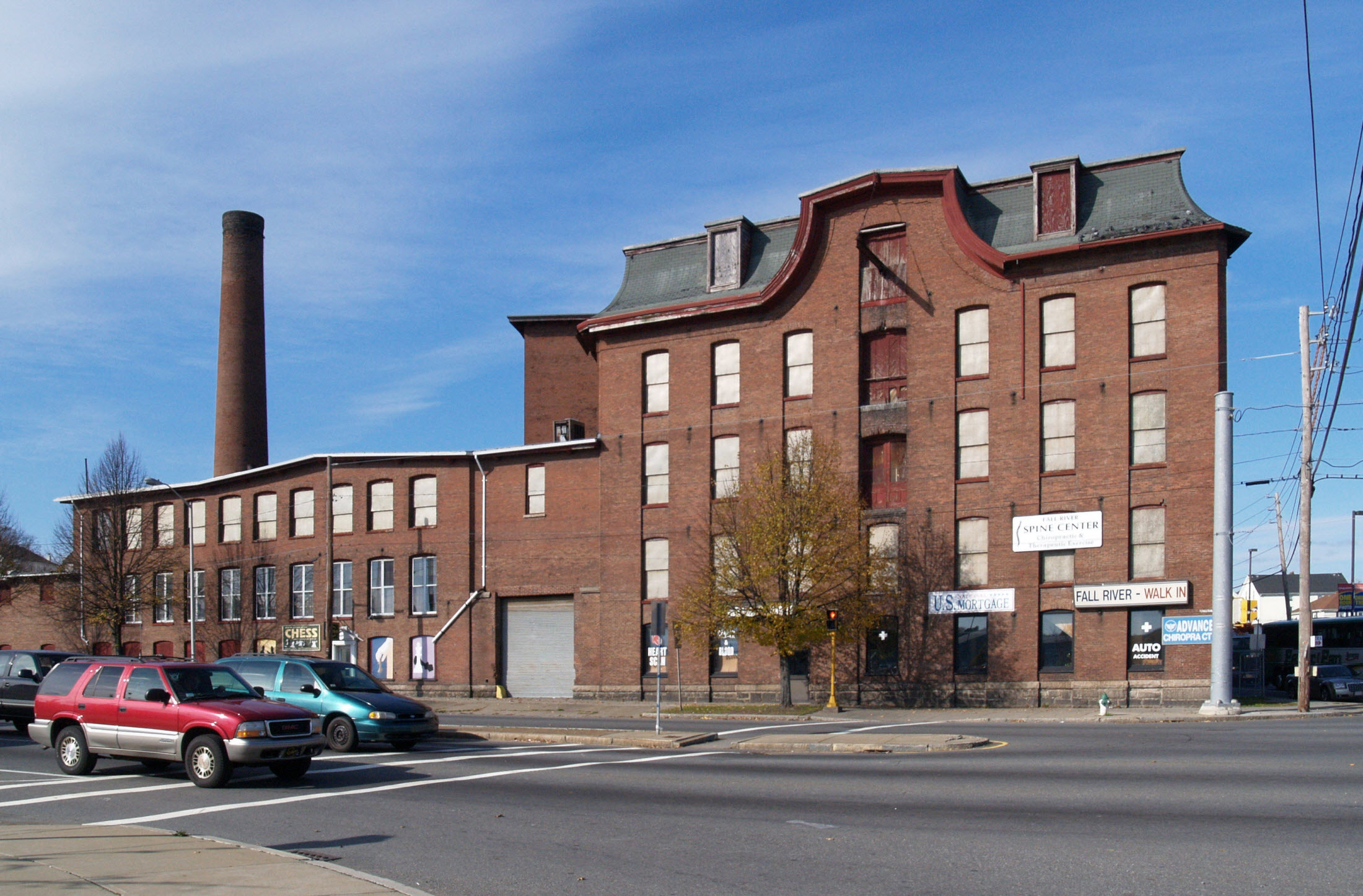
- Mill No. 1

- Location within Massachusetts Location within the United States
- Location: Fall River, Massachusetts
- Coordinates: 41°41′44″N 71°9′11″W
- Built: 1867, 1871
- Architectural style: Second Empire
- Part of: Corky Row Historic District (ID83000656)
- Added to NRHP: June 23, 1983

Davol Mills is a historic textile mill complex located at the corner of Plymouth Avenue and Rodman Street in Fall River, Massachusetts. Built in 1867 and expanded in 1871, the red brick mills are unique in the city for their Second Empire style. The complex was added to the National Register of Historic Places in 1983 as part of the Corky Row Historic District.

== History ==
=== Founding and early operations ===
The Davol Mills Company was organized in 1866 with nineteen members and an initial capital of $270,000. The company was named in honor of William C. Davol, a machinery builder who is credited with importing the Roberts Self-acting Mule from Great Britain to Fall River in the early 1840s. Mill No. 1 was built in 1867 at the corner of Rodman Street and Eight Rod Way (now known as Plymouth Avenue). The machinery was in operation by March 1868. The Davol Mills initially produced cotton shirtings, sheetings, silks, and fancy fabrics.

=== Expansion and peak production ===
In 1871, Mill No. 2 was built along Hartwell Street, connected to the first mill. By 1917, the Davol Mills contained 44,692 spindles. The company acquired the nearby Tecumseh Mills in 1924.

=== Decline and closure ===
The mill shut down in 1935 during the Great Depression. The site was recorded as part of the 1968 New England Textile Mills II survey and photographed by Jack E. Boucher of the Historic American Buildings Survey.

== See also ==
- List of mills in Fall River, Massachusetts
- National Register of Historic Places listings in Fall River, Massachusetts
