= A. J. Borden Building =

- A.J. Borden Building
- U.S. National Register of Historic Places
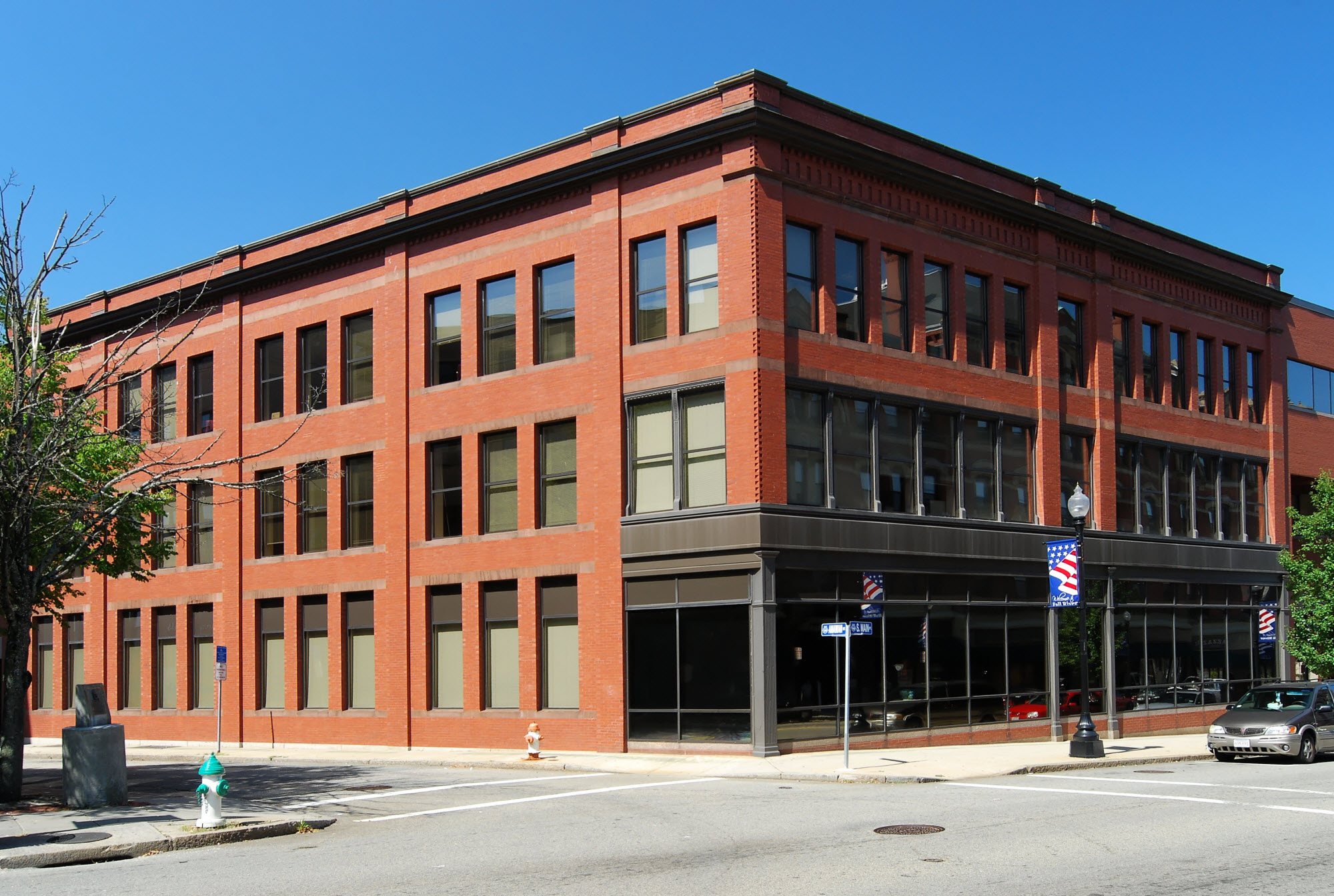

- Location within Massachusetts Location within the United States
- Location: 91-111 S. Main St., Fall River, Massachusetts
- Coordinates: 41°42′2.56″N 71°9′22.32″W
- Built: 1889
- Architect: Joseph M. Darling
- Architectural style: Late Victorian
- MPS: Fall River MRA
- NRHP reference No.: 83000629
- Added to NRHP: February 16, 1983

The A. J. Borden Building is a historic commercial building located at 91–111 South Main Street in Fall River, Massachusetts. The building was created for the businessman Andrew Jackson Borden in 1889. After his murder in 1892, it was inherited by Andrew's daughter Lizzie Borden who remained its sole owner until her own death in 1927. It later served as a JJ Newbury dime store, and as an office building for the Aetna Insurance Company. In the 21st century, the building serves an office building for the insurance company Travelers of Massachusetts.

== Description and history ==
It was built in 1889 by Andrew Jackson Borden and designed by Fall River architect Joseph M. Darling, who also notably designed several schools in the city.

After Borden's murder in 1892, the building was occupied by various businesses and owned by his daughter, Lizzie Borden until her death in 1927. The JJ Newbury dime store later occupied the building from 1931 into the early 1980s when it was acquired by Aetna Insurance Company. Today, it is occupied by the Travelers of Massachusetts insurance company.

It was added to the National Register of Historic Places on February 16, 1983.

== See also ==
- National Register of Historic Places listings in Fall River, Massachusetts
- Corky Row Historic District
