= Corky Row Historic District =

Historic district in Massachusetts, United States

- U.S. National Register of Historic Places
- U.S. Historic district
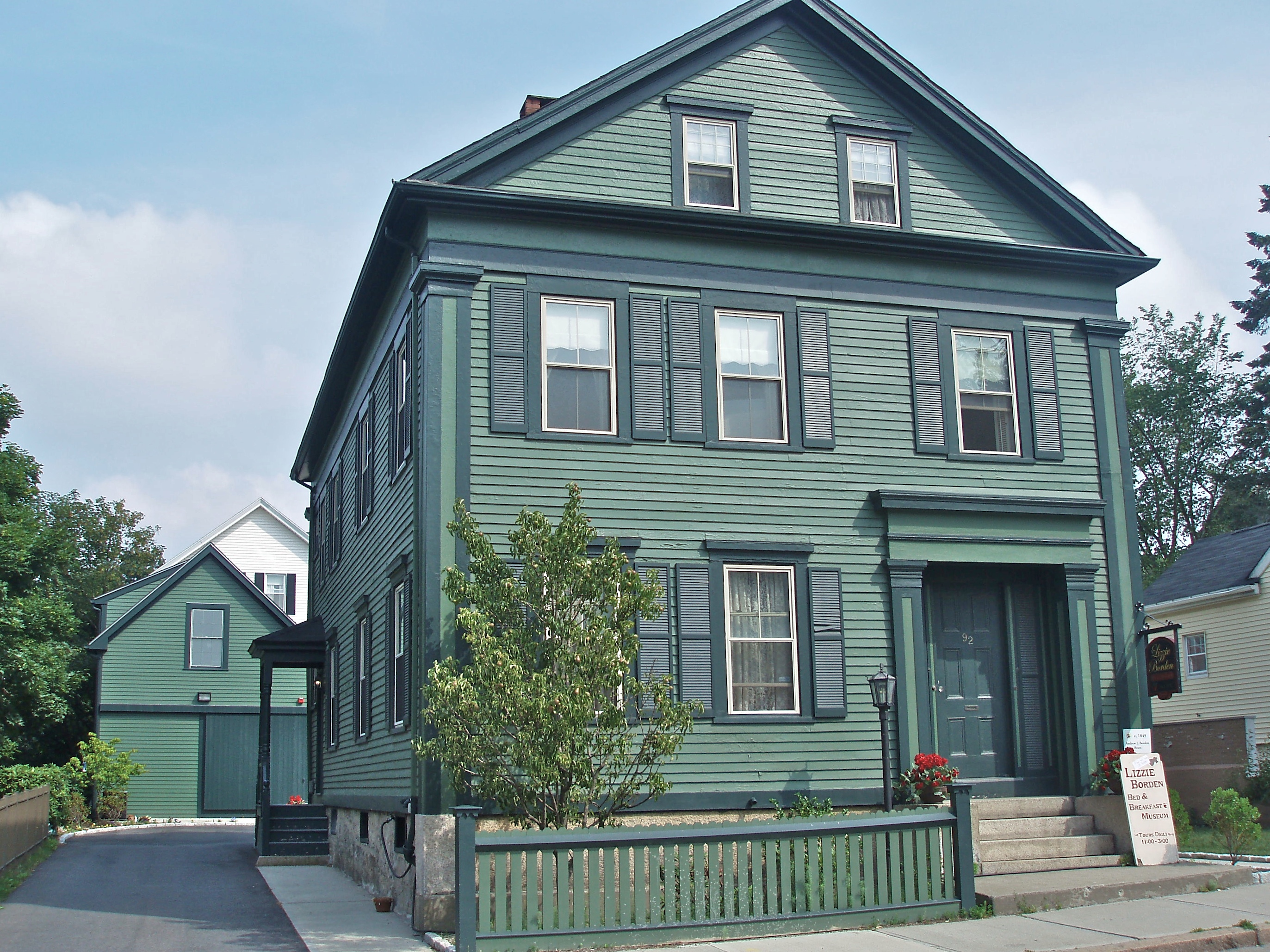
- Andrew Borden House, 230 Second Street, part of Corky Row Historic District

- Location within Massachusetts Location within the United States
- Location: Fall River, Massachusetts
- Coordinates: 41°41′43″N 71°9′23″W
- Architectural style: Early Republic, Greek Revival
- MPS: Fall River MRA
- NRHP reference No.: 83000656
- Added to NRHP: June 23, 1983

Corky Row Historic District is a historic district located in Fall River, Massachusetts bounded by Plymouth Avenue, Interstate-195 and Second Street. The district contains many early multi-family mill tenement houses, along with the Davol Mills, the Tecumseh Mill No. 1 and several commercial properties.

Perhaps the most famous property listed within the Corky Row Historic District is the house of Andrew J. Borden, located at 230 (92 before 1896) Second Street. This house was the scene of the infamous 1892 double ax-murder of Mr. Borden and his wife, which led to the trial and acquittal of Andrew's daughter, Lizzie Borden. Today, the house has been restored as a bed-and-breakfast.

The district contains over 400 structures with an area of 96 acres (390,000 m^{2}) and was added to the National Register of Historic Places in 1983.

== Historical background ==
The Corky Row neighborhood was developed between 1840 and 1870 and represents the second major phase of expansion within the city of Fall River. Largely settled by immigrants from County Cork, Ireland who came to work in the city's burgeoning textile industry. The historic district contains dozens of four- and six- family apartment houses in various configurations, as well as a number of classic New England–style triple deckers, many built by the new cotton mills constructed during the 1860s: the Tecumseh, Davol and Robeson Mills, located along Hartwell Street on the eastern edge of the historic district.

Today, the neighborhood contains a mix of residential and commercial uses, including recent developments along Plymouth Avenue, Hartwell Street and along Second and Rodman Streets. The Tecumseh Mill was converted into housing in the 1980s. The Robeson Mills (also known as Luther Manufacturing) were demolished in the 1990s for what is now Applebee's, Walgreens and a more recently built convenience store and gas station at the corner of Rodman Street and Hartwell.

The Corky Row Club, located on Third Street was established in 1938 as an Irish social club. The James T. Griffin playground, located within a few blocks of the Corky Row Club, was named for one of the first to be killed in World War II from the area.

== Contributing properties ==
Mills

- Davol Mills (1866, 1872), Rodman Street & Plymouth Avenue
- Tecumseh Mill No.1 (1866), Hartwell Street

Houses (partial listing)

- Andrew J. Borden House (1845), 230 Second Street
- Benjamin Kellogg House (1874), 14-20 Brow Street
- Tecumseh Mill Housing (1866), 300-308 Fifth Street
- Davol Mill Housing (1870), 367-371 Fifth Street
- Moses Dean House (1877), 201-203 Fourth Street
- Jeremiah Shea House (1885), 486 Fourth Street
- Thomas Gormley House (1881), 825 Plymouth Avenue

Commercial/other

- Giesow Building (1894), 120 Third Street
- Flat Iron Building (1908), 878-892 Second Street
- St. Mary's School (1906), 467 Spring Street
- Neill's Hotel (1899), 255 Third Street

Demolished

- Robeson Mill No. 1 (1866), Hartwell Street (demolished in 2001)
- Robeson Mill No. 2 (Luther Mfg. Co.) (1903), Plymouth Avenue (demolished early 1990s)

== Gallery ==
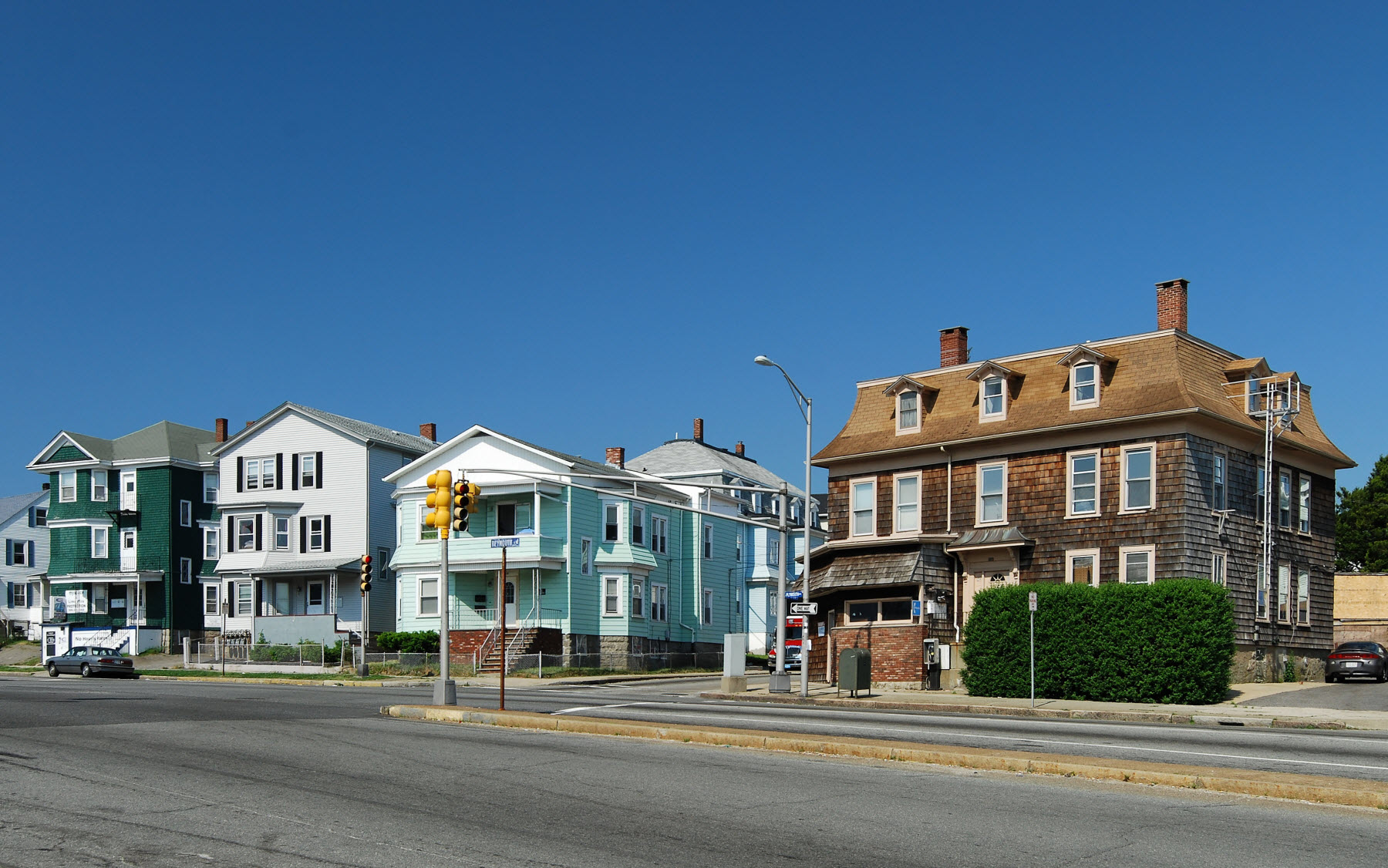
Plymouth Avenue at Lyon Street

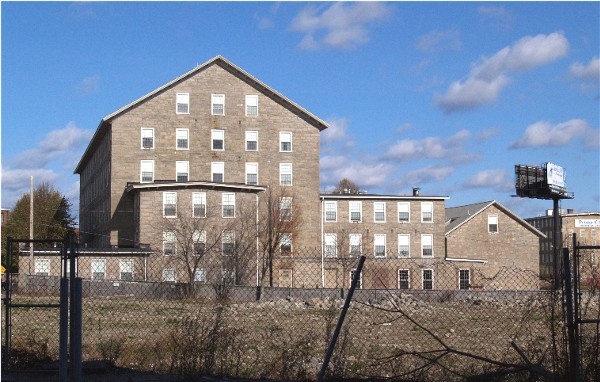
Tecumseh Mill (1866)

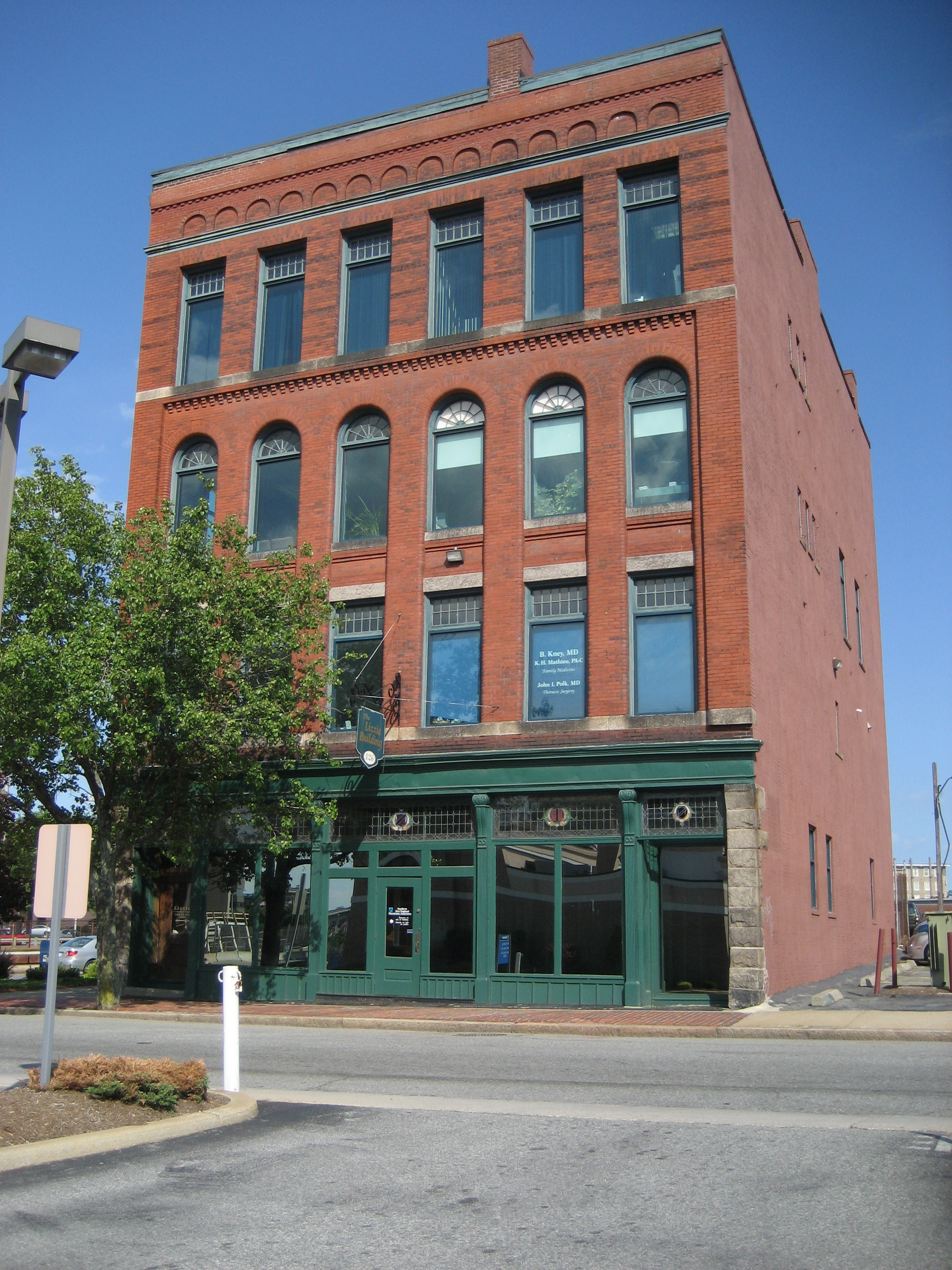
Giesow Building (1894)

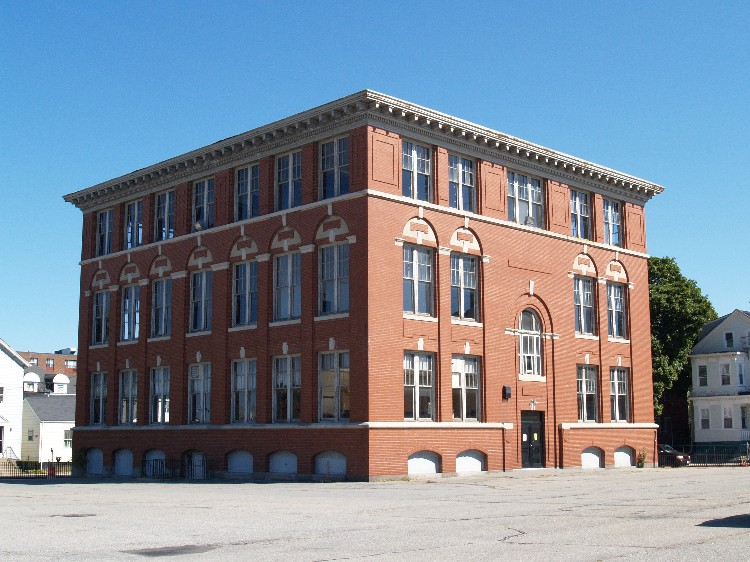
(former) St. Mary's School (1906)

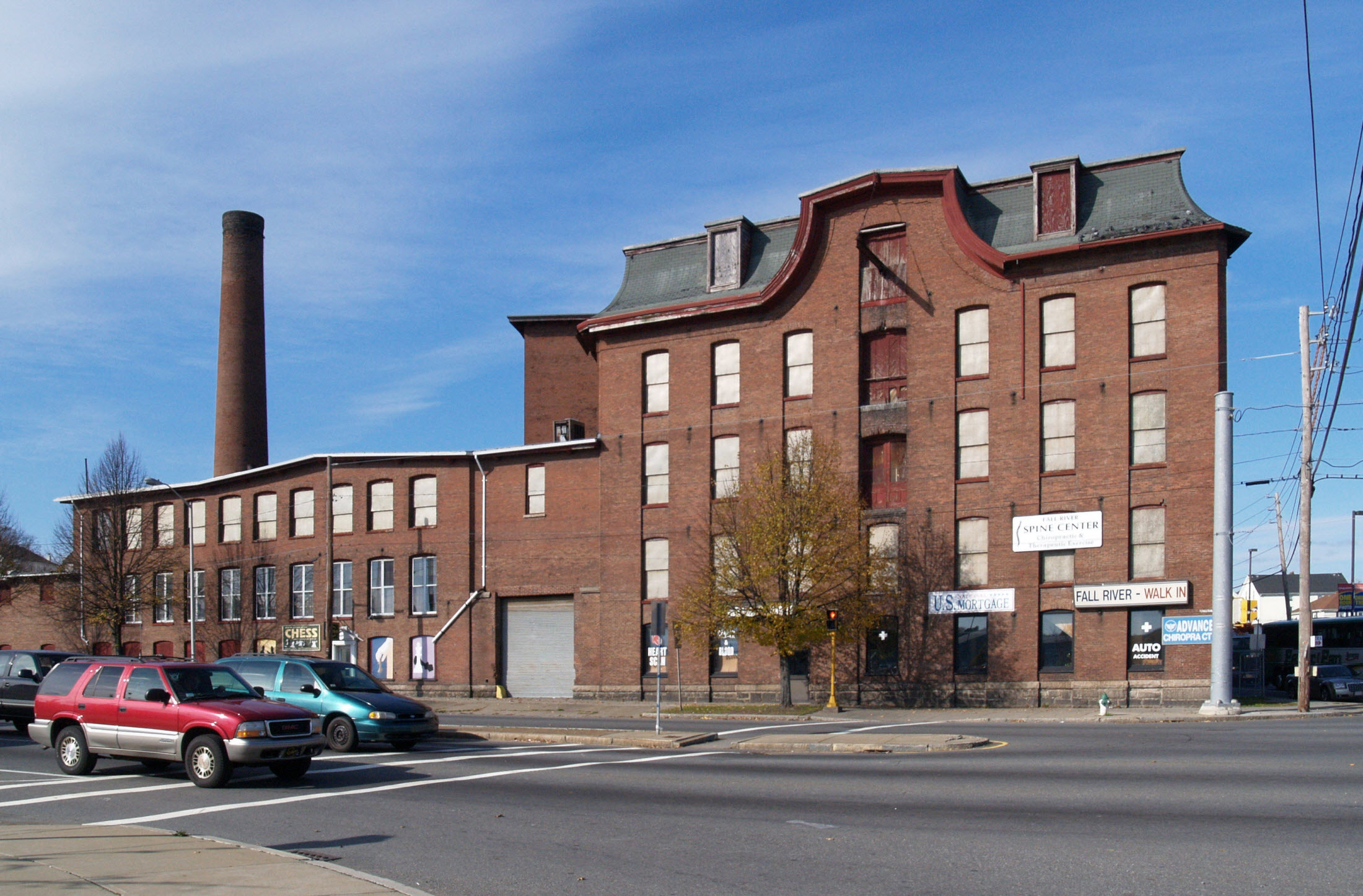
Davol Mills

== See also ==
- National Register of Historic Places listings in Fall River, Massachusetts
