= '47 (magazine) =

American magazine

'47: The Magazine of the Year '48: The Magazine of the Year
- Cover of the December 1947 issue
- Frequency: Monthly
- Publisher: Walter Ross
- First issue: March 1947
- Final issue Number: June 1948; Vol 2 No 6
- Country: United States
- Based in: New York City

'47 was an American magazine first published in the year 1947. It changed its name with the calendar and remained '48 until its demise in 1948. Because its title changed with the year, it is indexed in libraries by its subtitle, The Magazine of the Year.

'47 was a publication owned by hundreds of the best writers and artists of the day – owners who were also contributors. It was headed by Clifton Fadiman and among the writers who signed on were Roy Chapman Andrews, Roger Butterfield, Ilka Chase, Walter Van Tilburg Clark, Laura Z. Hobson, Howard Lindsay and Walter Lippmann. Included were John McNulty, Andy Rooney, Christopher Morley, Ogden Nash and S. J. Perelman. There were Upton Sinclair, John Steinbeck and Irving Wallace. The graphic artists Karsh and Marsh, Gropper, and Virgil Partch signed on.

The magazine, on both pulp and coated paper, about the size of Reader's Digest and Coronet, told of the changing times and of the new world coming. Readers in the forty-eight states learned about the territory of Alaska. FM broadcasting was going to give the air waves back to the listeners. Dr. Kinsey had some interesting news. John Gunther named all the white males who ran America. Social Security, a decade old, was reviewed. Rheumatic fever was a major killer of children. Nathaniel Benchley ventured "Up in Benchley's Room" and Albert Einstein recommended a few science books. Painter Jack Levine was hailed as a new young talent. A short story by Ralph Ellison, soon to be part of his new novel Invisible Man, appeared. Tasteful nudes and mildly funny cartoons were not eschewed.

'47 was more expensive than some other magazines of its time. It cost 35 cents a copy at the newsstand, at a time when the weekly Saturday Evening Post cost 10 cents a copy (raised to 15 cents as of the November 15, 1947, issue).

The magazine's run was not fully successful. Around September 1947, the magazine sent a postcard to subscribers, stating that until then, the magazine had "let everybody down" and been "flat, dull, ordinary". The postcard went on to inform readers that "[p]eople have been fired, ideas and departments shelved", and that they would soon receive a '47 which the editors could send out "(for the first time) with confidence and some pride".

Early in 1948, the magazine began to run advertising. Nevertheless, in May of that year, '48 wound up laying off its circulation department and then going to court for approval of a reorganization under the National Bankruptcy Act. According to Time magazine, despite the talents of its owner-contributors, The Magazine of the Year "had bought too much bottom-drawer stuff, because it could not afford the prices other magazines paid for top-drawer pieces". The Magazine of the Year came to an end with the June 1948 issue, after having published sixteen issues; at the time publisher Walter Ross ended publication, the magazine was $150,000 in debt after having cost its investors $700,000.

== See also ==
- 47Magazine & Media, a Gen-Z ran publication that features stories in music, fashion, entertainment, culture, and more.
- Ellison, Jerome (June 1969). "When Howells' Pipedream Came True". The New England Quarterly. 42 (2). The New England Quarterly, Inc.: 253–260. doi:10.2307/363668. JSTOR 363668.
- Science (magazine), another publication which changed its title annually
