= Robert Lowry (writer) =

American writer (1919–1994)

- Born: March 28, 1919; Cincinnati, Ohio, U.S.
- Died: December 5, 1994 (aged 75); Cincinnati, Ohio, U.S.
- Education: University of Cincinnati
- Occupations: Writer; illustrator; publisher
- Children: Beirne Lowry, David Lowry, Jack Lowry
- Relatives: Ruth Lowry (sister)
- Writing career
- Language: English
- Genres: Novel, short story
- Notable awards: O. Henry Award; 1950

Robert James Collas Lowry (March 28, 1919 – December 5, 1994) was an American novelist, short story writer, illustrator, and independent press publisher.

Lowry was born in Cincinnati, Ohio. He was a literary wunderkind who began writing at the age of 8; within a year, he had stories published in the Cincinnati Times Star. He graduated from Withrow High School in 1937, after which he entered the University of Cincinnati. He was, according to biographer James Reidel, a voracious reader of the literary works of Ernest Hemingway, William Faulkner, F. Scott Fitzgerald, and Guy de Maupassant.

== The Little Man Press ==
In 1938, while enrolled at the University of Cincinnati, Lowry served as editor for a university-sponsored chapbook titled The Little Man (whose credits claim it "was established in the Fall of 1937 by some students," but the contents were copyrighted under Lowry's name). William Saroyan contributed the lead essay "A Word on Reading and Writing."

The same year, with illustrator James Flora, a student at the Art Academy of Cincinnati, Lowry founded The Little Man Press. The partners published dozens of chapbooks under the Little Man imprint from 1939 to 1942. Lowry wrote many titles (some under such pseudonyms as James Caldwell), but the Little Man imprint published essays and fiction by Saroyan, Thomas Mann, Jesse Stuart, Charles Henri Ford, William Edward March Campbell, and others.

After Flora accepted a job offer from Columbia Records in 1942 and moved to Connecticut, Lowry continued to sporadically publish titles under a succession of revived Little Man imprints.

== Writing career ==
In 1942 Lowry was drafted, and served three years in the US military during World War II, during which he saw combat in North Africa and Italy. After his discharge, he divorced his first wife, wrote critically acclaimed fiction (his fans included Ernest Hemingway), and wrote an autobiographical novel (The Big Cage). Lowry was hired by James Laughlin as office manager at New Directions Publishing in September 1945. Leaving in Fall 1946 to concentrate on writing full-time, Lowry came under the influence of the editor George Davis, and for a time, flourished as a rising new voice in American fiction. His books and short stories in the late 1940s and 1950s recounted his wartime experiences. He also wrote about life in New York's Greenwich Village during the emergence of the beatnik scene.

His published works included Casualty (1946), Find Me in Fire (1948; cover teaser: "She Was Young But Ripe for Love"), and The Violent Wedding (1953). His short stories appeared in Mademoiselle, New Directions, Collier's, Horizon, The American Mercury, and other periodicals. His short fiction was collected in three volumes: The Wolf That Fed Us (Doubleday, 1949), Happy New Year, Kamerades! (Doubleday, 1954), and Party of Dreamers (Fleet Publishing Corp., 1962).

During the 1950s, Lowry wrote book reviews for Time magazine and the Saturday Review of Literature. In 1950, he won the O. Henry Award for his short story "Be Nice to Mr. Campbell." His story "Layover in El Paso" was adapted for a 1959 feature film titled That Kind of Woman, directed by Sidney Lumet and starring Sophia Loren.

Lowry also wrote screenplays for TV series such as Schlitz Playhouse, G.E. True Theater, Starlight Theater, and Actors Studio.

Lowry had two short stories published in Mademoiselle that were illustrated by James Flora, his former Little Man Press partner: "Little Baseball World" (September 1946) and "The Mammoth Molar" (September 1951).

== Visuals arts/design ==
Lowry was also a visual artist. He illustrated the covers of some of his independently published works, and the title page of each story in Happy New Year, Kamerades, was adorned with a minimalist brush-and-ink illustration by the author.

While employed at New Directions, Lowry designed book jackets for titles by Tennessee Williams, James T. Farrell, Christopher Isherwood, Thomas Merton, Dylan Thomas, Pablo Neruda, Henry Miller, and others. According to Lowry researcher Robert Nedelkoff, "James Laughlin said he'd always loved the Little Man books and said he thought that Lowry may have had greater promise as a book designer than as a writer. He thought Lowry had peaked with Casualty and the other books were downhill."

== Psychological profile ==
Lowry had dark impulses, which were exacerbated by liquor. "In Cincinnati," recalled Flora, "he would take one drink and go berserk, throwing himself on the floor, saying 'I'm a rug! I'm a rug! Step on me!'"

In 1952, following a second marriage and the birth of a son, Beirne, Lowry was diagnosed as a schizophrenic and forced to undergo electric shock therapy. He spent the rest of his life passing in and out of "insane asylums" (his preferred term), squalid hotels, and turbulent relationships with women (including two more marriages). In the 1960s, he fostered an association with George Lincoln Rockwell, founder of the American Nazi Party, which alienated many of his friends and supporters. He continued writing, but because of his volatile and unpredictable personality, reputable publishers declined to publish his manuscripts. During the final decades of his life, Lowry, often destitute, self-published many additional works.

He died in Cincinnati, age 75, at the Veterans Administration Medical Center in Cincinnati. At the time of his death, all his commercially published books were out of print.

== Selected works ==
=== Novels ===
- Casualty (1946)
- Find Me in Fire (1948)
- The Big Cage (1949)
- The Violent Wedding (1953)
- What's Left of April (1956)
- The Prince of Pride Starring (1959)
- That Kind of Woman (1959)

=== Short story collections ===
- The Wolf That Fed Us (1949)
- Happy New Year, Kamerades! (1954) aka This Is My Night
- The Last Party (1956)
- New York Call Girl (1958)
- Party of Dreamers (1962)

== Original Works by Lowry online ==
- Text of The Knife, Lowry's self-published 1959 novella, with intro by Jim Reidel.

== Academic Collections ==
- Robert Lowry Collection at University of Southern California Library
- Robert Lowry Collection, at Kent State University
