= Victoria Lincoln =

American writer (1904–1981)

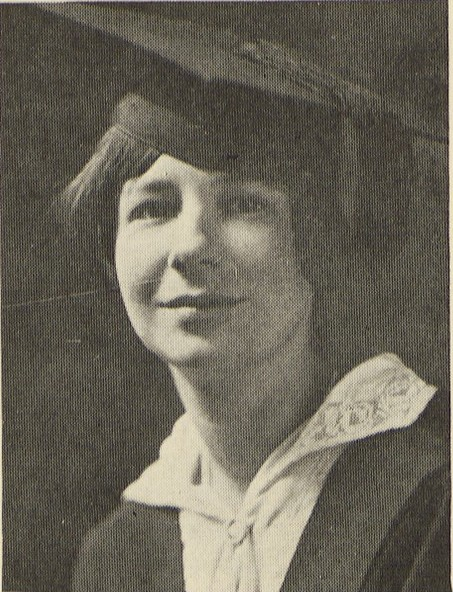
- Born: October 23, 1904; Fall River
- Died: June 13, 1981 (aged 76); Baltimore
- Occupation: Writer

Victoria Endicott Lincoln Lowe, who wrote under the name Victoria Lincoln, (October 23, 1904 – June 13, 1981) was an American novelist, biographer, and true crime writer. Her best known novel, February Hill (1934), was adapted for stage and screen. She won the Edgar Award for best fact crime book for her A Private Disgrace: Lizzie Borden by Daylight.

== Early life and education ==
Victoria Lincoln was born on October 23, 1904 in Fall River. Her parents were Johnathan Trayer Lincoln and Louisa Sears (Cobb) Lincoln. Lincoln attended Radcliffe College, and then lived in different locations including St. Louis and Europe.

== Career and life ==
Lincoln married her first husband Isaac Watkins in 1927. They were divorced in 1933, after which she married the philosopher Victor Lowe.

Lincoln is known for her writing which included books, biographies, and short stories. In a 1951 interview with the New York Times Lincoln described finishing her first book at age four. At age 14 she wrote a novel that would get published in a shorter form in Harper's Magazine in 1950. In addition to publishing books, Lincoln also wrote in notebooks that she stored away in an alligator-skinned trunk.

In 1934 Lincoln published February Hill, a book that was first adapted for the stage and then made into the movie Primrose Path.

Lincoln grew up in Fall River, Massachusetts and in 1967 she wrote A Private Disgrace, a book about Lizzie Borden, who also grew up in Fall River. In the book Lincoln's position was that Borden was guilty of murdering her parents during an epileptic seizure. In 1968 Lincoln received an Edgar Award for Best Fact Crime from the Mystery Writers of America for her book A Private Disgrace.

Lincoln's final book was a biography of the Roman Catholic saint Teresa of Avila which took her twelve years to complete.

== Later life, death and legacy ==
Victoria Lincoln died on 13 June 1981 in Baltimore.

== Selected publications ==
- Lincoln, Victoria (1947). February Hill. New York: Bantam Books. OCLC 912175757.
- Lincoln, Victoria (1944). Grandmother and the comet, an insubstantial pageant. New York; Toronto: Farrar & Rinehart. OCLC 4010561.
- Lincoln, Victoria (1947-01-01). The Wind at My Back: Three Short Novels (First ed.). Faber & Faber.
- Lincoln, Victoria (1951-01-01). Out from Eden. Rinehart & Company, Inc.
- Lincoln, Victoria (1954-01-01). The Wild Honey: Stories. Faber.
- Lincoln, Victoria (1968). A private disgrace : Lizzie Borden by daylight. Internet Archive. New York City : International Polygonics. ISBN 978-0-930330-35-4.
- Lincoln, Victoria (1984). Teresa, a woman: a biography of Teresa of Avila. Albany, N.Y.: State University of New York Press. OCLC 1036957054.
