= Everything That Rises Must Converge (disambiguation) =

Everything That Rises Must Converge is a 1965 collection of short stories by Flannery O'Connor.

Everything That Rises Must Converge or Everything That Rises may also refer to:

- "Everything That Rises Must Converge" (short story), a 1961 short story from the collection

== Music ==
- Everything That Rises Must Converge (album), by Sort Sol (1987)
- "Everything That Rises Must Converge" (Shriekback song), by Shriekback from the 1985 album Oil and Gold
- "Everything That Rises Must Converge" (The Handsome Family song), from the 1994 album Odessa
- "Everything That Rises" (Pop Will Eat Itself song), a 1987 single
- "Everything That Rises" (A Hope For Home song), from the 2011 album In Abstraction
- "Everything That Rises" (Moby song), from the 2013 album Innocents
- "Everything That Rises" (Sufjan Stevens song), from the 2023 album Javelin
- "Everything That Rises", a 1992 song by The Stunning
- Everything That Rises, a 2007 piece for string quartet by John Luther Adams

== Television ==
- "Everything That Rises Must Converge" (Ultraforce), episode 12 (1995)
- "Everything That Rises Must Converge" (Thief), season 1 episode 3 (2006)
- "Everything That Rises Must Converge" (The Big C), season 1 episode 12 (2010)
- Everything That Rises, a 1998 TV film directed by Dennis Quaid

== Other uses ==
- Everything that Rises Must Converge (exhibition), by Petah Coyne (2010)
- Everything That Rises: A Book of Convergences, a 2006 book by Lawrence Weschler
- Everything That Rises, a 2013 exhibition by Annie Martin
