= Wildcat (2023 film) =

2023 film by Ethan Hawke

- Theatrical release poster
- Directed by: Ethan Hawke
- Written by: Ethan Hawke; Shelby Gaines
- Based on: Short stories by Flannery O'Connor
- Produced by: Joe Goodman; Ethan Hawke; Ryan Hawke; Karri O'Reilly; Cory Pyke
- Starring: Maya Hawke; Rafael Casal; Philip Ettinger; Cooper Hoffman; Steve Zahn; Laura Linney
- Cinematography: Steve Cosens
- Edited by: Barry Poltermann
- Music by: Latham Gaines; Shelby Gaines
- Production companies: Renovo Media Group; Good Country Pictures; Under the Influence Productions
- Distributed by: Oscilloscope Laboratories
- Release dates: September 1, 2023 (Telluride); May 3, 2024 (United States)
- Running time: 108 minutes
- Country: United States
- Language: English
- Box office: $565,170

Wildcat is a 2023 American biographical drama film about American novelist Flannery O'Connor struggling to publish her first novel. Also based on O'Connor's short stories, the film was directed by Ethan Hawke and written by Hawke and Shelby Gaines. It stars Maya Hawke, Rafael Casal, Philip Ettinger, Cooper Hoffman, Steve Zahn, and Laura Linney.

Wildcat premiered at the 50th Telluride Film Festival on September 1, 2023. The film had a limited theatrical release in the United States on May 3, 2024.

== Plot ==
The film opens with Flannery O'Connor, an idiosyncratic young Southern writer and faithful Catholic, imagining a melodramatic movie trailer with a crazed, nymphomaniac boarder, Star Drake (played by Maya Hawke, who also plays O'Connor and multiple other roles) getting her boarding-house hosts into violent trouble. Many other imaginary and real episodes then occur, often following various short stories of O'Connor, including "The Comforts of Home", "Everything That Rises Must Converge", "Good Country People", "The Life You Save May Be Your Own", "Revelation", and "Parker's Back", as well as a scene from her novel The Violent Bear It Away and monologues adapted from O'Connor's non-fiction A Prayer Journal.

After winning a writing competition, she travels to New York to get approval from a publisher for her novel, Wise Blood, but refuses the request that she outline her work. She discusses her novel with Robert Lowell, who describes O'Connor as his most talented student and with whom she has mutual romantic feelings (though Lowell eventually marries Elizabeth Hardwick, whom O'Connor meets at a writers' party where she does not get along well with other guests).

Coming back from New York, she feels tired and has facial rashes; she learns she has lupus, of which her father died. She refuses to see a doctor for a while, but finally gets treatment for the illness. Eventually she needs to use crutches, at one point falling down the stairs. Her mother Regina, who occasionally demonstrates her racist prejudices, tries to help and support her, even if she does not always enjoy Flannery's writings and sees them as abrasive. Flannery buys a peacock for herself as a comfort.

An Irish priest counsels her about her internal struggles; she mentions James Joyce's Ulysses being banned in Ireland, which he agrees is needless. When O'Connor describes her difficulties to be a good Catholic, the priest recommends she do acts of charity and use her writing for that purpose. After receiving a letter from Lowell about his marriage to Hardwick, Flannery settles into a life of concentrated writing.

The film ends with an intertitle shown before the closing credits to inform the viewer that O'Connor continued to live for another fourteen years, eventually succumbing to what she called "the French wolf" (lupus). The final on-screen text after the credits is her quotation about her gratitude to thousands of pigs whose pituitary glands were used for making the lupus injections that kept her alive.

== Cast ==
- Maya Hawke as Flannery O'Connor, Sarah Ruth Cates, LucyNell Crater, Mary Grace, Star Drake, Joy "Hulga" Hopewell
- Laura Linney as Regina O'Connor, Mrs. Crater, Mrs. Turpin, Thomas's Mother, Jules's Mother, Mrs. Hopewell
- Philip Ettinger as Robert Lowell
- Rafael Casal as O.E. Parker
- David Towne as Buzz Cut
- Steve Zahn as Tom T. Shiftlet
- Cooper Hoffman as Manley Pointer
- Nikola V. Pajic as Thomas
- Willa Fitzgerald as Elizabeth Hardwick
- Caisey Cole as Jean
- Wilson Conkwright as Walter
- Christine Dye as Duchess, Pleasant Lady
- Laketa Caston-Hosey as Sullen Woman
- George Sheanshang as Claud Turpin
- Alessandro Nivola as John Selby
- Matthew Kimbrough as Doctor Block
- Demetrius T. Wheeler as Emmanuel
- Liam Neeson as Father Flynn
- Mehmet Can Aksoy as Jesus
- Daniel R. Hill as Tattoo artist
- Jan Falk as Mrs. Freeman, Mrs. Stevens, White Trash Mother
- Vincent D'Onofrio as Sheriff
- Kevin Downes as Fighting Couple Man
- Levon Hawke as Convict
- Bill Lobley as Trailer VO

== Production ==
Wildcat was written by Ethan Hawke and Shelby Gaines and directed by Hawke. The film was produced and fully financed by Renovo Media Group's Cory Pyke. Joe Goodman of Good Country Pictures, Hawke and son Ryan Hawke of Under the Influence Productions also produced. Maya Hawke executive produced and has a main role in the film. In January 2023, it was reported that Laura Linney, Philip Ettinger, Rafael Casal, Steve Zahn, Cooper Hoffman, Willa Fitzgerald, Alessandro Nivola, and Vincent D'Onofrio joined the cast.

Principal photography took place in Louisville, Kentucky from January 10 to February 11, 2023. Filming also took place in Shelbyville and Frankfort of central Kentucky.

== Release ==
Wildcat's world premiere was held at the 50th Telluride Film Festival on September 1, 2023. It was also shown at the 2023 Toronto International Film Festival on September 11, 2023.

In January 2024, Oscilloscope Laboratories acquired North American rights to the film. It was released in limited theaters in New York and Los Angeles on May 3, 2024.

== Reception ==
On the review aggregator website Rotten Tomatoes, 59% of 78 critics' reviews are positive, with an average rating of 5.8/10. The website's consensus reads: "Wildcat brings careful craft and solid acting to bear on an admirable idea; unfortunately, it still struggles to present a compelling picture of a brilliant author's inner life." Metacritic, which uses a weighted average, assigned the film a score of 55 out of 100, based on 15 critics, indicating "mixed or average" reviews.
