= Judgement Day (short story) =

Short story by Flannery O'Connor

- Short story by Flannery O'Connor
- Country: United States
- Language: English
- Genre: Southern Gothic

Publication
- Published in: Everything That Rises Must Converge
- Publication type: Single author anthology
- Media type: Print (hardcover)
- Publication date: 1965

"Judgement Day" is a short story by Flannery O'Connor. It was published in 1965 in her short story collection Everything That Rises Must Converge. It was the last story O'Connor ever wrote: she was dying of lupus at the time of writing, and submitted it to her publisher Robert Giroux a month before her death in August 1964.

"Judgement Day" is an expanded version of O'Connor's 1947 masters' thesis story, "The Geranium", and Giroux remarked that the earlier story was a personal favorite of O'Connor's. Like "The Geranium", "Judgement Day" tells the story of an elderly white Southern man who has trouble adjusting to the relative racial equality of New York City. However, it adds religious overtones and a more thorough commentary on race relations, paralleling O'Connor's 1961 story "Everything That Rises Must Converge".

== Development ==
O'Connor graduated from the Iowa Writers' Workshop in 1947. Her master's thesis contained six short stories, each of which was subsequently published. One of the six stories, "The Geranium", was a personal favorite of O'Connor's. She named the thesis after "The Geranium" and sought to revise it into a more mature work on several occasions. In 1955, she wrote an early draft, tentatively titled "An Exile in the East", but did not publish it. Near the end of her life, she wrote a 26-page draft titled "Getting Home", which she then extensively revised and re-titled as "Judgement Day". She submitted "Judgment Day" to her publisher Robert Giroux in early June 1964, and died on August 3. The following year, Giroux published the story in O'Connor's posthumous collection Everything That Rises Must Converge.

In 1993, Karl-Heinz Westarp (Aarhus University) collected all four versions of the story and published them as Flannery O'Connor: The Growing Craft. Reviewing the drafts, Marshall Gentry (University of Indianapolis) suggested that "An Exile in the East" may have more interesting sociological insights than "Judgement Day" and that O'Connor might have continued revising the story but for her fatal illness.

== Plot summary ==
In New York City, elderly and partially-disabled Georgian T. C. Tanner lives with his daughter and son-in-law. He despises New York and resents the fact that he has to rely on his daughter for lodging. His daughter has abandoned Christianity and passive-aggressively complains about how he is an ungrateful guest. His Northerner son-in-law mocks his racism, even though he uses racist language himself and his wife is also racist. One day, Tanner overhears his daughter saying that she will break her promise to bury him in Georgia when he dies. To ensure that he will be buried in the South, he resolves to return home, "dead or alive".

Tanner reflects on how he ended up in New York. He used to be a landowner in Corinth, Georgia, but fell on hard times and became homeless. He squats on abandoned land, rooming in a shack with his black assistant, Coleman. On a visit home, Tanner's daughter is appalled to see him sharing a room with a black man. She offers to take him to New York, but he demurs. However, when the land is bought by Dr. Foley, an affluent part-black physician, Foley threatens to evict him unless he becomes his employee. Twisting the knife, Foley gloats that the old ways are dying and that someday, many white men will work for black men. Tanner pridefully leaves the South.

Tanner learns that his way of dealing with Southern blacks does not work in New York. In the South, he could intimidate the poorer blacks through a combination of brute force, condescension, religious flattery, and taking advantage of their lack of education. However, in the North, the blacks do not fear him. When he learns that his new next-door neighbors are an interracial couple, he repeatedly tries to chat up the black husband in the Southern manner, presuming that he is from the South. However, the man is a native New Yorker, a professional actor, and a nonbeliever, and is deeply offended by Tanner. The neighbor tries to avoid Tanner, but Tanner refuses to take the hint and the neighbor refuses to look past Tanner's slights. After several testy exchanges, the neighbor loses his cool and assaults Tanner, causing Tanner to suffer a debilitating stroke. Following the stroke, Tanner begins dwelling on his own mortality and is consumed by thoughts of the Last Judgement.

Tanner attempts to leave the apartment, but he can barely make it to the stairwell. When he sees his black neighbor walking up the stairs, he antagonizes him once again. The neighbor responds by shoving his head through the stairwell balustrade like "a man in the stocks". Tanner dies. His daughter buries him in New York. However, she is struck by guilt, and finally arranges for his body to be shipped back to Georgia.

== Themes ==
Flannery O'Connor utilizes significant themes such as religion and identity to represent the characters and the events in "Judgement Day". Throughout the short story, these themes are ingrained in crucial moments, illustrating O'Connor's use of her own beliefs in her work. Sins and forms of salvation are widely illustrated in many of her works that are centered on God in the world.

=== Religion ===
Religion and faith are the main key themes seen in "Judgement Day". O'Connor utilizes her connection and faith in Christianity, more importantly, her devotion to the beliefs of Roman Catholicism, to emphasize the story and its symbolism of death and "going home". Writer for Renascence Micheal O'Connell writes that "Judgement Day" displays religion as a central theme as it shows Tanner finding hope in God. O'Connell states "In the published version, O'Connor's revisions emphasize Tanner's sense of hope. Although he is aware that he is at the mercy of forces beyond his control, he responds to this by placing his faith in God." Toward the end of the story, Tanner then leaves his daughter's apartment, quoting scripture from Psalm 23, then he "tries to act in such a way that God will be able to come to him. By attempting to leave New York and return to Georgia, even though he knows he almost certainly will not make it back alive, Tanner is acting decisively and claiming some amount of agency for himself and is also opening himself up to God's providence." O'Connor suffered from the lasting effects of lupus in the last 13 years of her life, often relating characters in her writing in a way that shares similar struggles as well as a shared faith. O'Connell states that many describe "'Judgement Day' being not only the culmination of O'Connor's career, but, in a sense, the culmination of her faith as well. The story serves as an affirmation of one of the most fundamental tenets of her faith: that death is not a desolation but rather a homecoming that can be approached with joy." O'Connor ties in her own religious beliefs to the story as "She draws a distinction between a physical location and the eternal home that the Christian seeks, which in turn is an echo of the Catholic belief in the Church as 'a pilgrim people' journeying back to the heavenly homeland. Clearly, Tanner's desire to get back to Georgia – 'dead or alive' – has more to do with O'Connor's notion of the 'eternal and absolute' country than with the physical land Tanner no longer owns" This connection between herself and Tanner is "a reflection of O'Connor's beliefs about her own spiritual journey. Despite his numerous physical afflictions, Tanner is able to make it home." To add more emphasis to this, "O'Connor underscores this spiritual homecoming by having Tanner's daughter, against her initial inclinations, bury her father in Georgia. The old man's body is both physically and spiritually at home."

=== Identity and race ===
Identity and race are the other key themes in this story, seen throughout the interactions Tanner has with other characters. Focusing on how Tanner sees himself compared to the African American characters, he uses many racial stereotypes when he addresses or speaks to those characters. In an article for Flannery O'Connor Review, Doreen Fowler analyses the use of race and identity in "Judgement Day" by comparing Tanner to the African American characters. Fowler explains that "O'Connor focuses intensively on the cultural formation of hierarchical racial identities." Fowler also adds that "Tanner identifies himself by means of a white-black tension" This being due to Tanner's disassociation between how race is handled in the north compared to back in Georgia. In multiple instances in the story, Tanner imagines Coleman right behind him, following him wherever he goes. Creating the imagery of a shadow that lingers behind Tanner, illustrating that "the image visualizes language's relational meanings: Tanner needs the black man behind him to establish his own primacy" Fowler continues, "The shadow is, of course, an image for the double, the alter ego or other self." And "the text implies that Coleman is Tanner's denied self and that only Tanner's denial – both psychological and cultural – separates white from black" At the moment in the story where Tanner calls out to an African American man who is his neighbor, calling him a preacher, but knows nothing about the man, not even his name. Tanner assumes the man is from South Alabama and is a preacher, neither of which is true. He simply labeled the man due to racial stereotypes. "Outraged, the other man struggles to define himself and to reject the southerner's racial stereotypes" and that "for Tanner, race difference is immutable, natural law, and race entirely defines their relationship." Sometime later in the story, Tanner had fallen down the stairs when the actor found him. Fowler writes, "At one level, Tanner, who now looks like 'a man in the stocks,' is judged for his racism. At a symbolic level, when the actor thrusts Tanner through the spokes of the staircase banister, he shows the other man how it feels to be pigeon-holed by culture's system of relational meanings." Even at the end of the story, "Tanner is trying to raise himself up, just as, symbolically, throughout the story he has been trying to establish his ascendancy as a white man" This story, among so many others, raises the question: Why is being black or white such a significant and distressing contrast? Fowler writes that the story "addresses precisely this question and reveals that difference, particularly racial difference, is a cultural artifact, produced by enforced separation and subordination, in an attempt to make living beings conform to language's rigid either/or definitions"
