= The Weight (2026 film) =

Historical drama film by Padraic McKinley

- Theatrical release poster
- Directed by: Padraic McKinley
- Screenplay by: Matthew Booi; Shelby Gaines
- Story by: Matthew Book; Leo Scherman; Matthew Chapman
- Produced by: Simon Fields; Nathan Fields; Ryan Hawke; Jonas Katzenstein; Maximilian Leo
- Starring: Ethan Hawke; Russell Crowe; Julia Jones; Austin Amelio; Avi Nash; Lucas Lynggaard Tønnesen; George Burgess; Cameron Brady; Avy Berry; Alec Newman; Sam Hazeldine
- Cinematography: Matteo Cocco
- Edited by: Padraic McKinley; Matthew Woolley
- Music by: Shelby Gaines; Latham Gaines
- Production companies: Fields Entertainment; Under The Influence; Augenschein Filmproduktion
- Distributed by: Vertical (United States); Capelight Pictures (Germany)
- Release dates: January 26, 2026 (Sundance); September 18, 2026 (United States); November 19, 2026 (Germany)
- Running time: 113 minutes
- Countries: Germany; United States
- Language: English
- Box office: $4 million

The Weight is a 2026 historical drama film directed by Padraic McKinley in his directorial debut, from a screenplay by Matthew Booi and Shelby Gaines. A co-production of Germany and the United States, it stars Ethan Hawke, Russell Crowe, Julia Jones, Austin Amelio, Avi Nash, and Lucas Lynggaard Tønnesen.

The film had its world premiere at the 2026 Sundance Film Festival on January 26, and had its international premiere out of the competition of the 76th Berlin International Film Festival on February 17. It was theatrically released in the United States by Vertical on September 18.

== Plot ==
In 1933 Eugene, Oregon, Samuel Murphy is a World War I veteran and widower, struggling to provide for his young daughter Penny amidst the Great Depression. Evicted and forced to sell Penny’s teddy bear, Murphy is provoked into a fight by plainclothes policemen and sent to prison, leaving Penny in a children’s home.

Four months into his imprisonment, Murphy arrives at the Deschutes County Convict Labor Camp, where prisoners reduce their sentences by clearing roads. He impresses Warden Clancy by engineering the removal of a boulder, and is invited to his cabin. Repairing the warden’s Ford Model 18, Murphy shares his despair that he will not be released in time to stop Penny from becoming a ward of the state. Clancy offers him an early release in exchange for a dangerous undertaking, and Murphy accepts.

Murphy enlists his bunkmates Rankin, Singh, and Olson, and the four are brought to a gold mine in Klamath Falls run by Taggert, who explains that under President Roosevelt’s new order, the mines will be closed and the gold seized by the government. To avoid the deadly looting already seen at other mines, Taggert tells the four convicts that they will earn their freedom by carrying his supply of gold bricks to safety, meeting him across the lake after a six-day journey.

The four convicts begin their trek through the wilderness with packs full of gold, escorted by Taggert’s armed guards Amis and Letender. Sensing they are being followed, Murphy captures Anna, an Indigenous woman desperate to escape the mining camp. She joins the group and they reach a treacherous rope bridge, where Murphy is forced to stand midway to catch and toss the gold to the other side, brick by brick. Making camp for the night, the group is discovered by a miner, but Amis and Letender dismiss Murphy’s concerns about an ambush.

Fording a river, Murphy rescues Rankin from being swept away by a log jam, and is nearly drowned by the panicking Rankin. He beats Rankin in retaliation and injures his hand, but Anna saves his swollen finger and his wedding ring. When the miner returns with reinforcements, Murphy and the others steal their boats, but Olson is shot in the leg and Anna grazed in the back. Reaching shore, an unsteady Olson strikes his head, rendering him catatonic. Murphy treats Anna’s wounds, and she reveals that she ran away from a ”training” school.

That night, Rankin witnesses Amis and Letender smother Olson to death, and warns the others. On the final morning of the journey, Murphy intervenes when Letender tries to force himself on Anna, but is brutally beaten. Letender prepares to shoot them, revealing the convicts are to be killed after delivering the gold, but is fatally strangled by Rankin. As Taggert arrives by truck, Murphy realizes he is actually stealing the gold, and manages to save Singh and kill Amis. Taggert drives off with the gold, but Murphy commandeers a passing car and runs him off the road.

Murphy and the others confront Clancy at his cabin with the gold and the truth: the warden was promised a cut in exchange for providing Taggert with unwitting prisoners to carry out the robbery. The group has disposed of the bodies of Taggert and his men, who will be assumed to have fled with the missing gold, and Clancy grudgingly agrees to an equal split, including a share for Olson’s family, in exchange for the three convicts’ release.

Taking the warden’s car, Murphy drives Singh and Rankin to freedom while Anna joins him in Eugene. He is reunited with Penny, returning her teddy bear as he takes her on a joyride.

== Cast ==
- Ethan Hawke as Samuel Murphy, a recently incarcerated man
- Russell Crowe as Warden Clancy
- Julia Jones as Anna, an Indigenous runaway who accompanies Samuel and the other prisoners
- Austin Amelio as Rankin, a prisoner
- Avi Nash as Singh, an immigrant prisoner
- Lucas Lynggaard Tønnesen as Olson, a young Scandinavian prisoner
- George Burgess as Letender
- Cameron Brady as The Man
- Avy Berry as Penny Murphy, Samuel's daughter
- Alec Newman as Taggert
- Sam Hazeldine as Amis, Clancy's lackey
- Jeffrey Lee Hallman as Big
- Dylan Page as Mrs. Akers
- Peter Lewys Preston as Ed Akers
- Caspar Steinbeck as Joe Akers

== Production ==
The film is from an original screenplay by Shelby Gaines, Matthew Chapman, and Matthew Booi, based on an original story by Booi and Leo Scherman. Padraic McKinley is the director and it is produced by Fields Entertainment, Under The Influence, and augenschein Filmproduktion, in collaboration with Construction Film. Simon Fields and Nathan Fields are producing for Fields Entertainment with Ryan Hawke for Under The Influence, and Jonas Katzenstein and Maximilian Leo of augenschein.

The cast is led by Ethan Hawke, Russell Crowe and Julia Jones.

Principal photography took place in and around Viechtach, Germany in July 2025.

The film was primarily shot in Bavaria and received €2 million from FilmFernsehFonds Bayern.

== Release ==
The Weight premiered at the Sundance Film Festival on January 26, 2026. In March 2026, Vertical acquired North American distribution rights to the film, it received a theatrical release in the United States on September 18.

== Reception ==
On the review aggregator website Rotten Tomatoes, 94% of 142 critics' reviews are positive, with an average rating of 7.4/10. The site's critics consensus reads: "The Weight turns a stripped-down tale of desperation into a gripping, hard-hitting thriller, elevated by Ethan Hawke's magnetic performance and Padraic McKinley's assured direction." Metacritic, which uses a weighted average, assigned the film a score of 70 out of 100, based on 28 critics, indicating "generally favorable" reviews. Audiences polled by CinemaScore gave the film an average grade of "B+" on an A+ to F scale.
