= Revelation (short story) =

Short story by Flannery O'Connor

- Short story by Flannery O'Connor
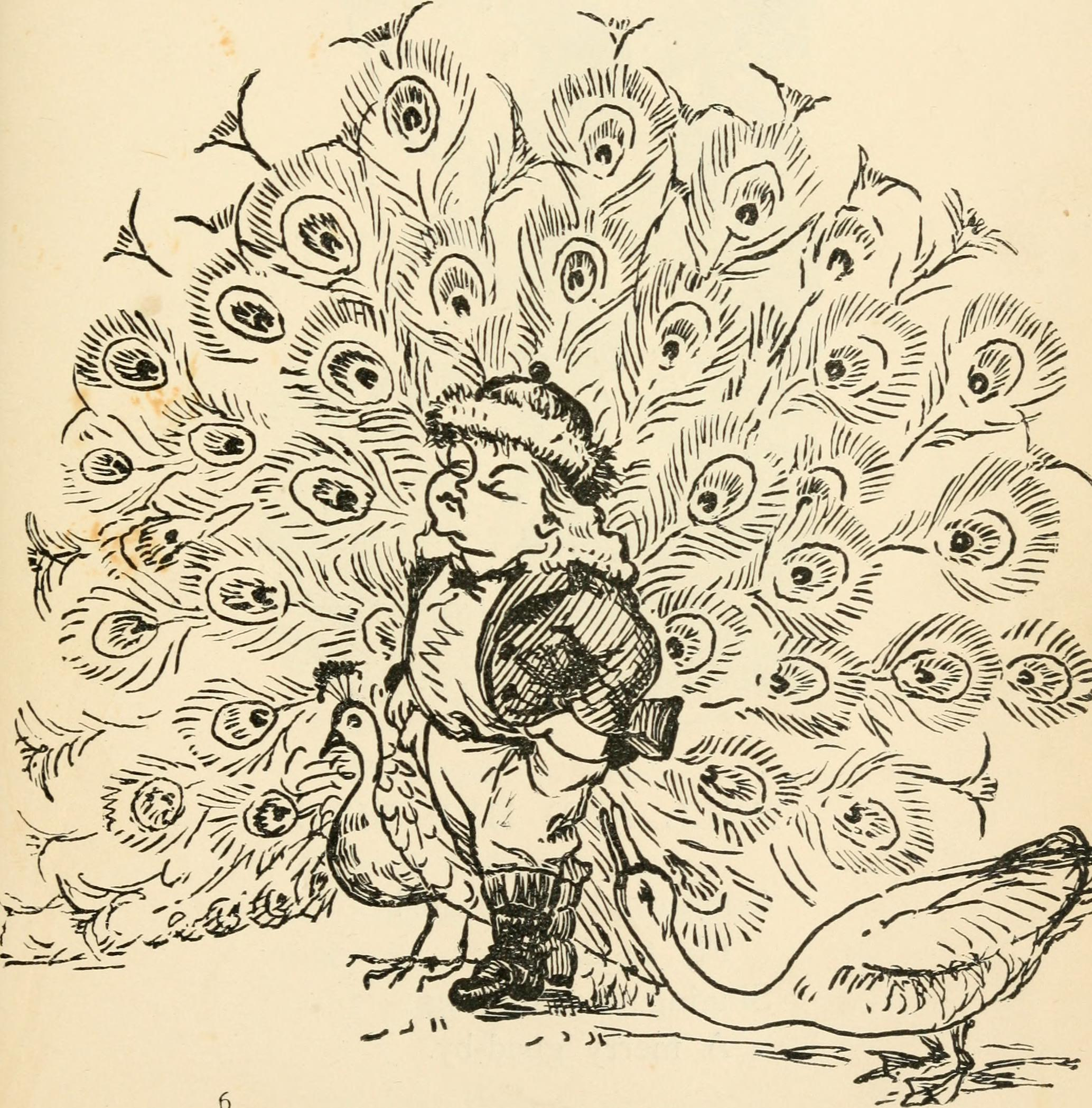
- Pride as sin symbolized by the peacock, an animal often used as an emblem of the author and her works.
- Country: United States
- Language: English
- Genres: Southern Gothic, short story

Publication
- Published in: The Sewanee Review
- Publication type: Literary journal
- Publisher: The University of the South
- Publication date: Spring 1964

"Revelation" is a Southern Gothic short story by author Flannery O'Connor about the delivery and effect of a revelation to a sinfully proud, self-righteous, middle-aged, middle class, rural, white Southern woman that her confidence in her own Christian salvation is an error. The protagonist receives divine grace by accepting God's judgment that she is unfit for salvation (like a baptized hog), by learning that the prospect for her eventual redemption improves after she receives a vision of Particular Judgment, where she observes the souls of people she detests are the first to ascend to Heaven and those of people like herself who "always had a little of everything and the God-given wit to use it right" are last to ascend and experience purgation by fire on the way up.

The work was written during the last year of the author's life, a time she knew she was dying from her fourteen-year battle with lupus. O'Connor worked on revisions of "Revelation" while hospitalized, hiding drafts under her pillow. She checked into the hospital and signed a letter to a close friend as "Mrs. Turpin", the story's protagonist. Some scholars believe the author was demonstrating that the character's racism was a mirror or projection of her own character.

== Publication history ==
"Revelation" was first published in the Spring 1964 issue of The Sewanee Review. The author was notified shortly before her death in August 1964 that her work won the O. Henry Award first prize for 1965, and the story was subsequently reprinted in Prize Stories 1965: The O. Henry Awards published that year. It was her third O'Henry Award first prize.

Sally Fitzgerald, a long-time friend of the author and wife of Robert Fitzgerald, noted that "Revelation" was one of the stories she undertook in the last year of her life and that it "may be seen as summings-up of all she had been trying to do in her work." Publisher Robert Giroux, who was working with the author on the short story collection Everything That Rises Must Converge during 1964, recalled that he knew he was "working with a dying writer" and that the drafting of "Revelation" was "kind of a horror story because she was so anxious to get the last story" into the collection. The work was included in Everything That Rises Must Converge published after her death in 1965. The story was also included in her short story collection The Complete Stories that was published in 1971 and won the National Book Award for Fiction in 1972.

== Characters ==
Flannery O'Connor said her craft involved realization of a "prophetic vision" where the "prophecy" is "a matter of seeing near things with their extensions of meaning and thus of seeing far things close up". The story's characters are one of the "near things" and one of the "far things" brought up close is the religious theme of salvation for which the former includes O'Connor's trademark "scrupulous anthropological attention" to the characterization of and interactions between characters. The characters in "Revelation" belong to the range of Southern racial and social classes of O'Connor's time. The critic, writer, and professor Hilton Als used "Revelation" to demonstrate the author's "most profound gift ... her ability to describe impartially the bourgeoisie she was born into, to depict with humor and without judgment her rapidly crumbling social order."

Literature professor and O'Connor scholar Karl Martin wrote that, "O'Connor's fiction is closely related to, and informed by, her systematic study of the role of the prophet in culture, and her fiction exhibits prophetic tendencies in accordance with the writing of not only the significant theologians of prophecy whose works she read and often reviewed but also the writings of later theologians.", including Claude Tresmontant's A Study of Hebrew Thought, Bruce Vawter's The Conscience of Israel, and Gustave Weigel's Modern God. With its focus on the actions of a prophet and the effects of her prophetic message, "Revelation" can be viewed as a literal realization of O'Connor's prophetic vision that most fully and maturely expresses her prophetic imagination.

=== The Turpins ===
The Turpins are a white, Southern married farming couple who own their land and home. They work their farm with the help of black workers, growing cotton and raising hogs, chickens, and cattle. While not wealthy, Mrs. Ruby Turpin, the story's protagonist, is so satisfied with her life that she thanks Jesus for being blessed for all her possessions and not "making" her black or "white trash". The Turpins live alone, and it is not clear whether they ever had children.

==== Ruby Turpin ====
The story's protagonist, Mrs. Ruby Turpin, is a "fat", "stout" forty-seven-year-old woman with "massive shoulders" and considers herself overweight at 180 pounds and thinks her ideal weight is 125. "Massive shoulders", "stout", and high weight are used by farmers to characterize a big hog raised for the livestock market, and she has other hog-like characteristics: small black eyes and smooth skin except for wrinkles around her eyes. Mrs. Turpin has an unquestionable faith in God. She also believes that she has received God's grace for salvation prior to the start of "Revelation" as her singing to a gospel hymn line, "And wona these days I know I'll we-ear a crown" reflects her unquestioned confidence in her election for an eternal life with God and is proud of it. (The line is from the gospel song "When I Looked Up And He Looked Down" with lyrics for a singer who is certain she will be saved and go to Heaven.) With her belief in predestination, she has been indoctrinated by a church tied to Reformed Protestantism and has been saved because she has been baptized. (In accordance with Reformed baptismal theology, the baptized have been made one with Christ's person.) Mrs. Turpin's belief in her salvation has made her righteous, which expresses itself as malignant actions and beliefs that the Roman Catholic church would declare to be sins. While Mrs. Turpin believes she has been cleansed of sin, she is crushed by the message, received as a revelation of divine judgment, that she is an old wart hog from Hell by Mary Grace. Since Mrs. Turpin judges people based on their piggishness – her perception of physical or moral filth, the revelation was consistent with Jesus' warning about hyprocrisy in Matthew 7:1–2: "Judge not, that you be not judged. For with the judgment you pronounce you will be judged, and with the measure you use it will be measured to you."

Using Mrs. Turpin as an example, Matthew Day characterizes the author's portrayal of conformity with Southern manners as a contributor to her moral corruption:

"For the White women who populate this fictional landscape the Southern code of manners reserves a kind of pre-articulate, vernacular model of feminine virtue that might be called 'gracious living.' ... Gracious living is a particular kind of moral sensibility, an ethos that is expressed by the "habits of choice" that her characters manifest in every domain of their lives. Manners are, in other words, the embodiment of the Southern woman's moral life."

"Painted in broad strokes the story ['Revelation'] explores how Mrs. Turpin, a woman who embodies what I've been calling the Southern virtue of gracious living, is slowly unhinged after being told to 'Go back to hell where you come from, you old wart hog'. ...through her doggedly Christian narrative voice, O'Connor suggests again and again that the Southern ideal of a graceful woman is morally suspect, a tradition which ultimately depends on repugnant distinctions based on race and class."

In a doctor's waiting room, gospel songs ironically trigger Mrs. Turpin's especially harsh damning judgments, as one song triggers her habit for judging people based on their shoes, and after another song, she blames a poor white mother's laziness as the cause for her sick boy's inability to eat. She disparages all of the people she perceives to have lower social status than herself, as she considers their souls predetermined for damnation, so she has no interest in the troubles of sick people in the waiting room, let alone having any compassion for them. Within the vision from the hogpen, the protagonist sees the corrupt Southern virtues of feminine gracious living (that are practiced in lieu of Christian virtues) being burned away.

Characterization of Mrs. Turpin in the role of the Pharisee in the "Parable of the Pharisee and the Publican" was formally identified by scholars in the early 1970s. In the parable, Jesus tells of a Pharisee in a temple, used as an example of a person confident of their own righteousness and looked down on everyone else, who prays to thank God he is not like thieves, rogues, adulterers, or the tax collector present a distance away, and further testifies in the prayer that he exceeds the requirements of performing some customs required by Jewish Law. Mrs. Turpin thanks Jesus in the waiting room for "making everything the way it is" including not being "made" a poor white or black person. In the parable, the Publican declares himself a sinner and asks Jesus for forgiveness. Jesus says that the Publican returned home justified before God while the Pharisee did not, and concluded, "For all those who exalt themselves will be humbled, and those who humble themselves will be exalted." The allusion foreshadows the protagonist's experience in the story, and also highlights the divine disapproval of inappropriate use of prayer, affirms doubt about the prospect for Ruby Turpin's salvation, and the waiting room's likeness as a temple. Pharisees, like Mrs. Turpin, believed in the after-life and predestination.

==== Claud Turpin ====
The injury of Claud, Mrs. Turpin's husband, from being kicked in the leg by a cow, is the reason for the couple's appearance at a doctor's waiting room, that serves as a place where characters of the story examine and judge each other. Claud is "florid and bald and sturdy, somewhat shorter than Mrs. Turpin" and seems to be "accustomed to doing what she [Ruby] told him to do" and most of his actions in the story are directed by his wife. He never hears his wife being told "Go back to hell where you come from, you old wart hog" since he was writhing in pain from his injury being kicked by his wife's assailant, and Mrs. Turpin never tells him full details of the attack. In the doctor's waiting room he is mostly quiet except to crack an extremely wicked racist joke.

=== Black characters ===
Flannery O'Connor understood that what she called "the race problem" was more than the establishment of equal rights – that the relationships between black and white people would require pervasive changes in individual relationships: "The South has to evolve a way of life in which the two races can live together with mutual forbearance." The use of "a-gruntin and a-rootin and a-groanin" to characterize human behavior in "Revelation" is used to identify threats to individual privacy and violations of the Southern code of manners aimed to protect it. O'Connor is famously stated in a 1963 interview:

"It requires considerable grace for two races to live together, particularly when the population is divided about 50-50 between them and when they have our particular history. ... Formality preserves that individual privacy which everyone needs and, in these times, is always in danger of losing. It's particularly necessary to have to protect the rights of both races. When you have a code of manners based on charity, then when charity fails, as it is going to do constantly, you've got those manners there to preserve each race from small intrusions upon the other.

By "charity", O'Connor refers to the Catholic theological virtue which is defined as the "love [of] God above all things for His own sake, and [love of] our neighbor as ourselves for the love of God", i.e., to "cherish" both God and neighbors. No white character in the story views black people charitably, as hatred for black people was only a matter of manners: Mrs. Turpin believes black people find themselves so detestable that they want to "go to New York and marry white folks and improve their color" and her husband's wicked joke is her comment stripped of its "good disposition"; and the "white-trashy" mother says loving black people (which Mrs. Turpin claims she does as it is necessary for them to work for you) was one of two things she never was ever going to do.

==== The Turpins' workers ====
The Turpins employ Black workers to pick cotton, and she speaks to them about Mary Grace's attack as they prepare for Mr. Turpin to drive them a short distance to their homes. Mrs. Turpin's general views about her Black workers are equivocal. To her, like for her own kind, some Black people are more agreeable to her than others, and the narration suggests Mrs. Turpin considers some Black people her friends. In particular, the toothless old Black woman who wears an old worn hat of Claud's seems to be someone Ruby Turpin respects as the protagonist confides with her Mary Grace's attack and the details of Mary Grace's curse. However, in the waiting room, Mrs. Turpin also considers Black people as dehumanized economic objects as she complained to Mary Grace's mother that she can't get anyone, Black nor white, to pick cotton anymore, and, in particular, she says Black people won't pick cotton because "they got to be right up there with the white folks". The complaint reflects her racist view that Black people ought to be cotton-pickers and her resentment about the dissipation of white farmers' power to exploit Black workers who, in the 1960s, have expanded opportunities to seek higher wages performing other labor.

Mrs. Turpin's implicit request for advice from her cotton-pickers yielded no useful insights and increased her frustration. Hilton Als observed: "O'Connor allows us to see what Mrs. Turpin's pride hides from her: how the Black people who work for her condescend to her, how they hide their intelligence so that she won't be tempted to interfere in their lives." The women sarcastically regard Mrs. Turpin as a privileged white woman living a charmed life "protected in some special way by Divine Providence" and are so confident of it that the old Black woman, on seeing Mrs. Turpin's injury, can insult her boss by saying, "You just had you a little fall.", meaning a fall from divine grace. The successful tactic by the workers to protect themselves from Mrs. Turpin's intrusion involved the toothless woman leading the conversation to present concern (as a good manner) for her boss' welfare and the younger workers outrageously saying that they would kill Mary Grace in order to be disregarded by Mrs. Turpin to not get involved. The old woman's regard for Mary Grace as a lunatic is also a way to avoid getting involved, as it is a matter of treating the mentally ill by professionals — O'Connor's hometown of Milledgeville, Georgia is the location of a state-run mental hospital.

==== The delivery boy ====
The single paragraph involving a delivery boy in "Revelation" presents the intracacy and intimacy of Southern manners aimed to preserve the privacy and safety of black males. The black delivery boy, who appears to be employed by the doctor's office to bring drugs from a pharmacy to the office on a fee-for-service basis, understands that his presence in the office is objectionable to some of the office's clients, so he tries to transact his business as unobtrusively as possible in cooperation with the office staff, who also understand some of the clients find it objectionable for a black boy to summon white professionals. He keeps his mind busy to calm his fears by playing music in his head by memory but his body betrays what is going on in his mind just as his "grotesque" shadow and bicycle betray the arrival of a young tall black man often perceived as ominous by any room full of white Southerners. When the office secretary is not at her desk to take a delivery, he waits quietly for her. However, Mrs. Turpin, relying on her experience with her black workers and her prejudice that black people are lazy and ignorant, does her "a-rootin" by interfering in a private transaction. She breaks the code of silence by suggesting he ring the service bell that gives him a way for calling the secretary. Soon after his departure, which sucks air out of the room (de-pressurizing it from the tension caused by his presence), the poor "white-trashy" mother complains that all black people should be sent back to Africa "wher they come from in the first place" — a response that would not surprise the delivery boy though his tactic was successful by avoiding any current or future direct confrontation, though at the cost of appearing lazy and unintelligent.

=== Mary Grace, a prophet ===
Mary Grace is, by definition, a prophet who delivers in an act of violence, a prophecy that is a revelation to Mrs. Turpin. Such an action is called a symbolic or a sign act that is originated from God. In the protagonist's case, the symbolic action is a prophecy of God's judgment with respect to the prospect for her salvation. Given the divine process for selecting prophets, Mary Grace willingly became one prior to the start of "Revelation". (For example, the recruitment of the protagonist and freak, Obidiah Elihue, to become a prophet is the subject of the author's short story "Parker's Back".) She reveals her association with God to Mrs. Turpin and everyone else in the waiting room by smirking at the woman immediately after smirking at the sunburst clock.

Mary Grace is an eighteen or nineteen year old with a grotesque appearance – a "fat girl" with a face "blue with acne". She is on summer break from her studies at the elite Wellesley College, a private liberal arts college for women located in Massachusetts that was established to prepare its graduates to become educators. Prophets are often religious teachers as preachers or ministers. She is studious, and based on her mother's comments, has no social life, which indicates that the prophet rejects the idea of becoming anything like the gracious Southern woman her mother is. The prophet is also rejecting her Southern identity as indicated by her mother's grimace at the thought of Massachusetts. Her mother's complaints about her bad disposition and lack of gratitude indicate disaffection for her family. Her silent disagreement with racist comments and jokes are reactions to sin.

In addition to her acne, Mary Grace has been diagnosed with a mental disorder. The doctor's office staff and mother's immediate reaction to restrain and sedate Mary Grace after her assault of Mrs. Turpin without any explanation is a treatment for the mentally ill and not a reaction to a crime or civil disorder. This authentic characterization of a prophet as one of her freaks appears to be an aspect of what O'Connor called her "realism". As one Catholic journal described prophets: "... the behavior of Old Testament prophets was so bizarre that by today's secular standards of sanity they would end up institutionalized, or, at the very least, in some form of intensive therapy." The outrageous nature of prophets was a challenge to O'Connor who felt accurate portrayals of them as native Southerners would test her credibility with readers. She famously wrote:

"When you write about backwoods prophets, it is very difficult to get across to the modern reader that you take these people seriously, that you are not making fun of them, but that their concerns are your own and, in your judgment, central to human life. It is almost inconceivable to this reader that such could be the case. It is hard enough for him to suspend his disbelief and accept an anagogical level of action at all, harder still for him to accept its action in an obviously grotesque character."

Symbolic actions include either a ritualistic gesture, a movement, a posture, or a dramatized act that are often bizarre gestures to deliver messages that must be perceived as authentically divine. Mary Grace combines her obesity, acne, and demonic facial expressions that include penetrating stares to make Ruby Turpin receptive towards accepting her message. Except for the acne, Mary Grace's staring and bizarre facial expressions are the normal behaviors of infants and young children, and with performance of the Palmar grasp reflex on her mother's thumb are all topics that could be covered in the child development chapters of a book on Human Development. Ruby Turpin may have been especially receptive, having an active inner-life that involves imaginative conversations with Jesus, being childless (unlike the other women in the waiting room) and unfamiliar with the demon-like expressions of children, and seems to be able to recall her Bible lessons very well. A knowledgeable Bible student could detect and be entertained by Old Testament prophet behavior and detect false prophets.

Overall, Mary Grace is successful. Ruby Turpin respects the authority of her curse through the woman's perception of her supernatural gaze and grotesque facial expressions. Mrs. Turpin detects the prophet's supernatural nature after Mary Grace's mother ends discussion about the waiting room clock (God) by mentioning she uses trading stamps to acquire "contour sheets":

"The daughter slammed her book shut. She looked straight in front of her, directly through Mrs. Turpin and on through the yellow curtain and the plate glass window which made the wall behind her. The girl's eyes seemed lit all of a sudden with a peculiar light, an unnatural light like night road signs give. Mrs. Turpin turned her head to see if there was anything going on outside that she should see, but she could not see anything. Figures passing cast only a pale shadow through the curtain. There was no reason the girl should single her out for her ugly looks."

Mary Grace's assault is so successful that it gets the wounded, disoriented, bewitched woman to "ask for it":

"Mrs. Turpin's head cleared and her power of motion returned. She leaned forward until she was looking directly into the fierce brilliant eyes. There was no doubt in her mind that the girl did know her, knew her in some intense and personal way, beyond time and place and condition. 'What you got to say to me?' she asked hoarsely and held her breath, waiting, as for a revelation."

Finally, as mentioned in the article "Prophet", prophets are often the targets of persecution and opposition. In "Revelation", Mary Grace's mission as a prophet is placed in jeopardy as an ambulance takes to her to a mental hospital, and is a heroine for her suffering in performance of her duty to God to help save Ruby Turpin.

See the portion of this article about the character's likeness to the Satan from the Book of Job.

=== Mary Grace's mother ===
Mary Grace's mother, also called the "stylish lady", the "pleasant lady", and the "well-dressed grey haired lady", is the only person in the waiting room the protagonist does not deride since the mother is perceived to have social status on par or superior to hers. She and Ruby Turpin agree about the feminine Southern virtues they feel they portray: well-dressed appearances, cleanliness, a "good disposition", good manners, and gratefulness. Through verbal and non-verbal communications, she and Ruby Turpin agree that the natures of "white-trash" and black people are detestable, in particular, the dirty family of the "white trash" woman. While proud of Mary Grace's attendance at an elite college, the mother describes to everyone in the waiting room Mary Grace's bad manners and lack of gratefulness so as to invite condemnation from strangers — a tactic to get her daughter to conform to her Southern ideals. After her daughter's assault on Mrs. Turpin, the mother focusses exclusively on her daughter, and ignores the injuries to both Turpins, offering no sympathy or apology.

Like the protagonist, the mother's pride has made her blind — in her case, to her daughter's ambitions. The mother cannot imagine why her own daughter would not like to be like herself. She cannot see that her daughter's exceptional academic performance may destine her life as a professional working woman, possibly somewhere north of the Mason–Dixon line; nor can she see that her daughter might already support the struggle for black civil and political rights, as might be reflected by her "Girl Scout shoes and heavy socks". (In 1956, Martin Luther King Jr. declared Girl Scouts as "a force for desegregation".) The mother's lack of imagination about her daughter's ambitions and ideals may have contributed the student's diagnosis of mental illness.

Mary Grace's non-verbal explanation for her assault on Mrs. Turpin was communicated subtly to her mother as a message delivered by a faultless innocent baby: "She [Mary Grace's mother] was sitting on the floor, her lips pressed together, holding Mary Grace's hand in her lap. The girl's fingers were gripped like a baby's around her thumb." Unlike Mrs. Turpin, the mother does not interpret her daughter's curse as a divine message since she cannot imagine that her daughter is a prophet. The mother's role in "Revelation" ends in a failure to recognize that her daughter's "wart hog from Hell" message could also apply to herself.

=== The "white-trashy" woman and her family ===
The "white-trashy" woman, an older woman who is likely her mother, and her young boy suffering from a stomach ulcer occupy seats in the doctor's waiting room when the Turpins arrive. The family appears to be impoverished and, presumably, keenly aware of their inferior social status as "trash" in the presence of the Turpins and Mary Grace's mother – all three are physically filthy, the older woman wears a dress made out of chicken feed sacks, and the trashy woman wears bedroom slippers and "gritty-looking" though garishly-colored slacks and sweat shirt.

The conversations involving the trashy woman, the two wealthier women, Mrs. Turpin and Mary Grace's mother, demonstrate how the two social classes detest one another. The trashy woman's overt resentment of the Turpins starts with an indignant silence when Mary Grace's mother suggests, not requests, that the sick boy make room for Mrs. Turpin to sit. After Mrs. Turpin judges the woman and her family of being bad mannered, lazy, and worse than black people "any day", she pronounces the beauty of the sunburst clock, whereby the trashy woman suggests the protagonist admires tacky decorations by mentioning the clock can be acquired using trading stamps. Mary Grace's mother defends Mrs. Turpin by mentioning that she acquires her contour sheets using trading stamps. When Mrs. Turpin brags about her hogs, the trashy woman comments that hogs are such "Nasty stinking things, a-gruntin and a-rooting all over the place" that she would never own one. Mrs. Turpin insults the woman by proudly claiming her hogs are "cleaner than some children I've seen", referring to the sick boy. The woman responds by saying she'd never washdown hogs and calls Mrs. Turpin a hog by muttering "a-gruntin and a-rootin and a-groanin" though the insult is lost on Mrs. Turpin, who changes the subject by bragging, "We got a little of everything" and continues to rant about how difficult it is to find workers to pick her cotton fields. All through the conversation Mrs. Turpin keeps her "good disposition" but has already thought about trash as being unredeemable and thanks Jesus in a silent prayer that she wasn't made trash. However, the trashy woman and her mother defy the characterization as unredeemable by their demonstration of sympathy for the mentally ill Mary Grace though they believe Mary Grace is a "lunatic" and not a prophet.

=== The watery snake ===
While at her pig parlor, Mrs. Turpin rails at God: "'If trash is what you wanted why didn't you make me trash?' She shook her fist with the hose in it and a watery snake appeared momentarily in the air." The snake-like monster mentioned in the Book of Job is Leviathan, described by God in Job chapter 41 and referred to by Job in Job 3:8 relating to his lament for being born, i.e. lament for his own existence, due to the suffering being inflicted upon him by Satan as permitted by God. As a parallel with the Bible, Mrs. Turpin regrets her own incarnation and demands an explanation from God for why she wasn't made to be a person who would be allowed to go to Heaven. In the context of Job 41:34 where "He [Leviathan] sees everything that is high; he is king over all the sons of pride.", Mrs. Turpin is figuratively, ruled by the spirit of pride in the spiritual world of Leviathan; and her faith in predestination has made her escape from it impossible. Figuratively, Mrs. Turpin can choose to leave the kingdom of Leviathan once she rejects her belief in predestination that can enable her to divorce her prideful spirit. Mrs. Turpin's desire to be remade into a black or white trash woman amounts to her will to reject her prideful ways.

The appearance of the watery snake in conjunction with the cleansing of hogs in the pig parlor, alludes to Leviathan being harbored in the water for baptism since while Mrs. Turpin's performs the chore, "The sun was behind the wood, very red, looking over the paling of trees like a farmer inspecting his own hogs." At that moment, God is inspecting Mrs. Turpin, a woman who has been baptized and has since sinned after her baptism. The purpose of the Cathlolic Sacrament of Reconciliation is for the faithful to have their sins committed after baptism absolved and, as a consequence, reconcile themselves with the Christian community. The appearance of Leviathan along with Mrs. Turpin at the pig parlor is the image of unabsolved sin in which Mrs. Turpin's place in Leviathan's kingdom separates her from God.

== Plot ==
The plot of "Revelation" starts with an examination of the character, Mrs. Ruby Turpin, from the perspectives of her inner life and her behavior while conversing with adults representing a cross-section of white Southern classes in a doctor's small, congested, unadorned waiting room. A radio fills the room with gospel music. The Turpins are white, land-owning farmers who employ black workers and consider themselves faithful Christians. Mrs. Turpin announces that her husband, Claud, has an abscess on his leg from being kicked by a cow, and makes point that she is healthy though overweight. Gospel music triggers a demonstration of Mrs. Turpin's inner thoughts about her hierarchical beliefs based on race and personal wealth that has poor black and white "trash" at the very bottom, and her notion that most people, except herself, are in a box car heading to a gas oven. In pleasant small talk, the conversations among the adults in the waiting room includes racist rants about black people and a fantasy that black people want to inter-marry with white people to enhance their class status.

Mrs. Turpin harshly judges each person in the waiting room except for the mother of Mary Grace, whose household appears to be wealthier than the Turpins'. Mary Grace is a Wellesley College student. Her mother grimaces when she mentions Wellesley is in Massachusetts. Mrs. Turpin regards Mary Grace as pitifully ugly. Mary Grace is enraged that the small talk has disrupted her reading of a book entitled Human Development and displays her anger through facial expressions and glares from penetrating blue eyes directed at and received by Mrs. Turpin. Ruby Turpin does not immediately respond, though she feels Mary Grace has known her for eternity. Mary Grace's mother announces to the room that her daughter is "ungrateful" and Ruby Turpin responds that she is so grateful for everything she possesses that she could shout, "Thank you, Jesus, for making everything the way it is!" In the room full of sick people, Mrs. Turpin thanks Jesus again and the examination of Mrs. Turpin ends when Mary Grace physically assaults the woman and is restrained and inoculated with a sedative. Mrs. Turpin asks Mary Grace for an explanation, and the student responds, "Go back to hell where you came from you old wart hog", which the woman treats as a revelation from God.

In the aftermath of Mary Grace's attack, Claud is treated by the doctor and the Turpins return home to take naps in their bedroom. Lying down in bed, Mrs. Turpin quietly cries and rejects the notion of being a wart hog from hell. She asks Claud to kiss her, and while he sleeps she scowls at the ceiling and makes motions "as if she were defending her innocence to invisible guest who were like comforters of Job". After Claud wakes up to drive their black workers back to their homes, his wife sees "unintelligible hand writing on the ceiling".

As black women who work for the Turpins wait for Claud, they notice the wound over Ruby Turpin's eye. Mrs. Turpin confesses that Mary Grace threw a book at her and called her "an old wart hog from hell". Two women exclaim that they'd kill Mary Grace and compliment Mrs. Turpin for being a nice white woman. Ruby Turpin's mind rejects the flattery and judges the women "idiots" as she provides them water for the short trip to their homes.

Ruby Turpin and Claud walk to their pig parlor to wash-down the hogs and the sty. Claud starts the job but his wife takes over and sends him off to drive their workers to their homes. While working as the sun sets spectacularly, she becomes enraged at her predicament shouts questions skyward: "How am I a hog and me too?"; and "How am I saved and from hell too?". She protests that she isn't a hog because she's not white nor black trash and receives a response in the form of a "garbled echo". Then she shouts, "Who do you think you are?" and like an echo "returned to her clearly like an answer beyond the wood." The answer she heard stopped her from shouting more. She watches Claud's truck recede in the distance and thinks of it colliding with a bigger truck that kills Claud and his passengers. In the next moments of quiet, she contemplates about her hogs that are in the red light of sunset where they "appeared to pant a secret life".

Just after sunset and while Claud's truck reappears, Ruby Turpin experiences a vision of people crossing a bridge of light from Earth towards Heaven. The people who ascend first are the white and black trash, freaks and lunatics at the bottom of her box car hierarchy who ascend as joyous, disorderly Christian soldiers. The last to begin their ascent are people who march as a tribe and include those like herself and her husband, though as they march upward "she could see by their shocked and altered faces that even their virtues were being burned away." Ruby Turpin sees the vision as her destiny. As she walks back to her house as night falls, she hears crickets chirping as "the voices of the souls climbing upward into the starry field and shouting hallelujah".

== Themes ==
The primary theme of "Revelation" is Christian salvation, and its plot demonstrates the author's application of Catholic theology to judge whether or not a conformist Protestant Southern woman, Ruby Turpin, can really be redeemed. "Revelation" is an example of the writer's vision in which "the final measure of things is theological. The short story is replete with religious themes and biblical allusions, the latter seen as the realization of the Bible stories of the "Parable of the Pharisee and the Publican", Jacob and Job, among others, in the work that were crafted, in part, to fulfill O'Connor's goal to increase the meaning of the story with an approach she called "anagogical vision".

=== Justificatio sola fide, sola gratia, and predestination ===
Flannery O'Connor, a devout Roman Catholic, literally has the Catholic and Protestant doctrines on salvation collide when the protagonist is hit in the face by a book called Human Development thrown by a college student named Mary Grace. On the creation of Mary Grace, the author said in a letter, "Mary Grace I found in my head, doubtless from reading too much theology."

Justificatio sola fide and sola gratia are two theological doctrines on salvation that distinguish Reformed (Calvinist) and Lutheran Protestantism from both Roman Catholic and Eastern Catholic Churches. The Calvinist and Lutheran doctrine of sola fide asserts God's pardon for guilty sinners is granted to and received through faith alone, excluding all "works" (good deeds); and the doctrine of sola gratia asserts that salvation comes by divine grace or "unmerited favor" only, not as something merited by the sinner (i.e., excluding all works). Protestants follow the doctrine known as monergism, which asserts that God acts alone to save the sinner; the responsibility for salvation does not rest on the sinner to any degree. By contrast, the Roman Catholic view asserts that salvation does involve some form of cooperation between divine grace and human agency. This view is known as synergism.

Ruby Turpin's ruminations on Jesus' power to configure her as a Negro, White, poor, wealthy, fat, thin, attractive, ugly, clean, filthy or "a good woman and it don't matter what else, how fat or how ugly or how poor" reflects her faith in God from the Calvinist theological doctrine on predestination though it is not known whether the protagonist attends a Reformed Protestant church. Mrs. Turpin's faith in God appears to be unquestionably strong. When her own salvation is cast in doubt she wants to know why she is being punished instead of abandoning her faith. O'Connor's Christian vision, however, is rooted in Catholic theology that holds that sola fide is not sufficient to justify salvation. In her 1963 essay, "The Catholic Novelist in the Protestant South", the author wrote that the exercise of free will by characters is an essential element of Catholic fiction:

"The Catholic novel cannot see man as determined; it cannot see him as totally depraved. It will see him as incomplete in himself, as prone to evil, but as redeemable when his own efforts are assisted by grace."

O'Connor's principle is applied in "Revelation" as a drama to see whether or not Mrs. Turpin can exercise free will to overcome her belief that people are inferior because Jesus made them inferior and so earns them oppressive racist and prejudicial treatment (even dispensed with a "good disposition").

With regard to sola gratia, Ralph C. Wood, a Protestant, contrasts the Protestant and Catholic doctrines with respect to O'Connor's works: "Against the Reformers' notion that God's gracious decision determines our final outcome, O'Connor believes that only in death is our life weighed in the balances and our destiny eternally fixed." Overall, from the perspective of Catholic doctrine the means by which Protestants can be redeemed is viewed as highly problematic:

"We have seen that Protestants claim the following three qualities for justification: certainty, equality, the impossibility of ever losing it. Diametrically opposed to these qualities are those defended by the Council of Trent (sess. VI, cap. 9-11): uncertainty (incertitudo), inequality (inaequalitas), amissibility (ammisibilitas)."

=== Mortal sin, venial sin, the sin of pride, and purgation ===
In a Christmas 1963 letter about an early draft of "Revelation", O'Connor left no doubt that Ruby Turpin is "evil" and is a sinner. Ralph C. Wood stated that Southern Christians are at risk of what Catholic doctrine would consider a mortal sin: "For Flannery O'Connor, race was indeed the curse of the south in the sense that it was the single-most important test which we as white Christians failed. For O'Connor, the mistreatment of black people is a violation of their being creatures made in the image of God." With regard to denying people of their humanity, the protagonist with her faith in predestination cannot be charged with mortal sin given her actions described in "Revelation", though her actions are averse to divine law and are designated as venial sin punished and corrected by undergoing purgation.

==== Pride as sin and a source of moral and spiritual blindness ====
For the Roman Catholic Church, pride is considered the "queen of all vices" and is defined as "the excessive love of one's own excellence", and for a character like Ruby Turpin, "regards himself as the source of such advantages as he may discern in himself, or because, whilst admitted that God has bestowed them, he reputes this to have been in response to his own merits, or because he attributes to himself gifts which he has not; or, finally, because even when these are real he unreasonably looks to be put ahead of others." Pride is considered particularly serious because it can lead to more serious sins: "Vainglory, ambition, and presumption [the desire to essay what exceeds one's capacity] are commonly enumerated as the offspring vices of pride, because they are well adapted to serve its inordinate aims." In "Revelation" the protagonist demonstrates disobedience to the principles of Christianity by putting herself ahead of others (as in the box car social hierarchy), and attributing her wealth to her own efforts (and not those of her workers or advantages from her race and social status). She is uncharitable in that she has become blind to the needs of the sick that surrounded her in the waiting room and the disadvantaged and oppressed people that surround her at large.

==== Purgation ====
In the vision, Mrs. Turpin sees the souls of people crossing a purple bridge to Heaven through a field of fire being purified. Some are cleansed; however she sees the souls of people like herself being punished for committing venial sins. Ralph Wood's characterization of O'Connor's view on judgment at the time of death is consistent with the Catholic Church doctrine: "For unrepented venial faults for the payment of temporal punishment due to sin at time of death, the Church has always taught the doctrine of purgatory."

The protagonist learns by witnessing a vision of Particular Judgment that her righteousness about race and class are wrong and that her satisfaction with the Southern social order that she thanked Jesus for not changing provides a rationale for purgation. For O'Connor, consistent with Catholic doctrine, that alone will not save her – Mrs. Turpin's vision implies that the protagonist must initiate a life-changing transformation (for example, to comply with Jesus' commandment, "Love thy neighbor as thyself"), that will involve difficult choices that will entail accepting or rejecting God's grace.

=== Violence ===
Mary Grace throws her book at Mrs. Turpin after the woman testifies in a silent prayer that her sin is a reward for her faith: "'Thank you, Jesus, for making everything the way it is!' It could have been different!"

In a 1963 introduction to a different short story, O'Connor explained she used violence because she saw no other way to bring her characters to their senses, which is to say at least get them to recognize the offering of divine grace:

"...[I]n my own stories I have found that violence is strangely capable of returning my characters to reality and preparing them to accept their moment of grace. Their heads are so hard that almost nothing else will do the work. This idea, that reality is something to which we must be returned at considerable cost, is one which is seldom understood by the casual reader, but it is one which is implicit in the Christian view of the world."

The cost of the assault to the protagonist is suffering, humiliation, and the realization that if she accepts the revelation as divine grace she must scrap her identity as a gracious Southern woman with its social norms based on corruptions of the Christian virtues.

=== The mystery of divine judgment and the realization of the Book of Job ===
==== Parallel plot events and O'Connor's anagogical vision ====
As a story about salvation, "Revelation" is also a story about divine judgment in the form of Mary Grace's attack and delivery of a revelatory message that Mrs. Turpin is "going to hell". The story includes a scene in the protagonist's bedroom where "Occasionally she [Ruby Turpin] raised her fist and made small stabbing motions over her chest as if she were defending her innocence to invisible guests who were like the comforters of Job, reasonable-seeming but wrong." Scholars have identified parallels in plot and themes between the work and the Book of Job since the 1970s, and Jordan Cofer, in particular, concluded Mrs. Turpin starts to "equate herself to Job" after Mary Grace's attack. With respect to plot events, the parallels appear to cover the entire breath of the Book of Job with many of them occurring in the same order they appear in the Bible. However, the actual plot lines are different, since the protagonist has been taught the story of Job earlier in life and, unlike Job, Ruby Turpin is a sinner. Furthermore, "Revelation" is written with both Old and New Testament perspectives, while the Book of Job is an Old Testament story. Within the story, the parallels are also discovered by the protagonist through her memory and imagination that causes her to recall the multiple lessons from the Bible story each at different moments to dramatic and comedic effect.

The very close parallels between "Revelation" and the Book of Job invites anagogical interpretation of the story by identifying narratives similar to both stories so that in an anagogical sense with respect to the divine judgment of Ruby Turpin's soul, the mysteries of "Revelation" are the same as those posed as the theological questions and theme from the Book of Job: "Why do the righteous suffer?" and "Why are the righteous pious?".

==== The protagonist as Job ====
Like Job, Mrs. Turpin views herself as charitable and good, superior to the morally flawed people around her, and believes she suffers from divine punishment. However, the two are also much different. Job is a man described by God as a person "none like him in the earth, a perfect and an upright man, one that feareth God, and escheweth evil."(Job 1:1) In the Bible story, God allows Satan to torment Job in horrific ways to test Satan's claim that Job is good only because God blessed the man with wealth and prosperity, but neither God nor Satan ever tells Job that he is the subject of the test. In contrast, O'Connor's Ruby Turpin institutes her own measure of justice, believing in her own Christian perfection in that she outrageously considers herself a modern-day Job (after failing to find any fault in herself while laying-down in bed) and is blind to the grotesque conformity and self-righteousness expressed as racism and class prejudice that are part of the foundation of an oppressive society. Mrs. Turpin does not physically suffer the torments Satan casts onto Job, though her husband's wound is worsened and Mary Grace's message that the she is a wart hog from Hell torments her with the thought of eternal damnation until she witnesses the vision near the end of the story.

==== Mary Grace as Satan ====
On receiving feedback on a draft of "Revelation" from a friend, O'Connor said, "I wasn't thinking of Mary Grace as the Devil but then the whole story sort of happened". In the Book of Job, Satan is one of the "sons of God" (Job 1:6) who accuses Job of being pious only because God has materially blessed him, and God lets Satan torment and torture Job to see if Job remains pious. Mary Grace with her demon-like appearance and facial expressions is a physical caricature of what most Christians associate with Satan as the Devil. However, in the Book of Job, Satan is not characterized as evil. In "Revelation", Mary Grace is only accused of being ill-mannered and ungrateful. The similarities are more than skin-deep, as Michael L. Schroeder pointed to key similarities between Mary Grace and Satan in their roles as antagonists in their respective stories:

- Mary Grace, like Satan, is not anchored to a single home. God asks Satan, "From where have you come?", and Satan responds, "From going to and fro on the earth, and from walking up and down on it."(Job 1:7) Mary Grace goes to college in Massachusetts, seems to strongly dislike her Southern hometown, and the breath of her intellectual interests are universal rather than parochial as indicated in her reading the book Human Development and Wellesley coursework.
- The two definitions of "satan" in Hebrew are "accuser" and "adversary" (see the article "Satan"). Mary Grace is satan in both ways: she accuses Mrs. Turpin of being a wart hog from Hell, and she physically assaults Mrs. Turpin. In addition, Mrs. Turpin believes that Mary Grace is an adversary given her facial expression communications, that she had known her for all her life, and that Mary Grace specifically selected her for the "wart hog from hell" message.
- The actions of Mary Grace, like Satan in the Book of Job, start the chain of events that reveal essential spiritual principles the protagonist is to follow.

==== Conversations with friends ====
After Mary Grace's attack, Ruby Turpin lies in bed at home "defending her innocence to invisible guests who were like the comforters of Job". She calls her workers "Idiots!" in a rage that recalls Job's anger with his sympathizers in the Book of Job chapter 30. In the Bible (Job chapters 2 – 27), Job is comforted by three friends — Eliphaz, Bildad, and Zophar, and later they are joined by young Elihu. Job believes neither of the first three men have explained his suffering. (The older men accuse Job of sins for which he is being punished for. Their views about God and Job are so incorrect that God rebukes them after God reconciles with Job in chapter 42.) In the Bible, Elihu speaks but neither God nor Job recognizes or responds to him. At this point in "Revelation", the protagonist contemplates Mary Grace's attack as a punishment in the form of retributive justice for sin resulting from a divine judgment. However, Job does not know what sin he is being punished for. After contemplating her predicament in bed and her effort to consult her three women workers whose views she considers as useless "Negro flattery", she remains clueless about her faults. (A boy with the women sitting in Claud Turpin's truck and says nothing is in the role of Elihu.)

==== The wicked prosper or go unpunished ====
The question of "Why do the righteous suffer?" is exposed in the Bible and "Revelation" as allegations about the unfairness of divine justice when the protagonists observe that the wicked prosper or go unpunished. Job refutes his friends, who insist that God always punishes the wicked by saying in Job chapter 21, "Why do the wicked live, reach old age, and grow mighty in power? Their offspring are established in their presence, and their descendants before their eyes. ...How then will you comfort me with empty nothings? There is nothing left of your answers but falsehood."(Job 21:7–8, Job 21:34) Ruby Turpin's complaint is articulated in contemplation while she lies on her bed: "She had been singled out for the message, though there was trash in the room to whom it might justly have been applied. The full force of this fact struck her only now. There was a woman there who was neglecting her own child but she had been overlooked. The message had been given to Ruby Turpin, a respectable, hardworking, church-going woman. The tears dried. Her eyes began to burn instead with wrath."

==== Final appeals ====
In Job chapter 31, Job refutes his three friends' accusations that he is being punished for his sins. Job appeals by listing numerous sins and one-by-one says if he committed the sin, then he should be punished for committing it. He remains confused and frustrated because he believes has not committed any of the sins, yet he continues to believe he is being punished.

In "Revelation", Mrs. Turpin does not disavow sins, but rather insists that she is virtuous. Her first appeal is that she is charitable to black and white trash and to her church. For her second appeal, she argues that she is not trash, as she continues to believe only white trash and black people have not been elected for salvation, admitting to sin for which she firmly believes is a virtue: "There was plenty of trash there [in the waiting room]. It didn't have to be me. If you like trash better, go get yourself some trash then." She remains confused and frustrated because she feels surrounded by trash.

==== Ruby Turpin laments being born and conjures Leviathan ====
The parallels between "Revelation" and the Book of Job extend to the appearance of Leviathan. The entire chapter 41 of Job describes Leviathan as a powerful, fearsome serpent-like monster that dwells in the sea. God says Leviathan "sees everything that is high" and declares it "king over all the sons of pride" in Job 41:34. The image is that the proud are ruled by a monster that dwells in the ocean.

In Job chapter 3, Job is so tormented by Satan that he laments his birth. Job asks for help to rouse the monster Leviathan so it can "perish" the day he was born: "Let those curse it [my birth] who curse the day, who are ready to rouse up Leviathan."(Job 3:8)

In "Revelation", Ruby Turpin considers the proposition that if she cannot be saved then poor white and black people must have been chosen for salvation and aims her anger at God to lament being born as Ruby Turpin to comical effect: "You could have made me trash. Or a nigger. If trash is what you wanted why didn't you make me trash?" In her frustration she conjures Leviathan with her water hose: "She shook her fist with the hose in it and a watery snake appeared momentarily in the air."

==== Ruby Turpin contends with the Almighty and fails as a "Job" ====
Mrs. Turpin directs her wrath at God for not making her the filthy kind of person she suspects God has chosen for salvation. Her frustration culminates by challenging God with the question, "Who do you think you are?", after which she belatedly recalls the basic Sunday school Bible lessons on Job (on the virtues of piety, humility, the fear of God, pride as a sin, and that man does not have sufficient knowledge or understanding of God or God's work to question divine judgment), placing herself in Job's exact position before God in Job 40:1–5:

"And the Lord said to Job: 'Shall a faultfinder contend with the Almighty? He who argues with God, let him answer it.'

"Then Job answered the Lord and said: 'Behold, I am of small account; what shall I answer you? I lay my hand on my mouth. I have spoken once, and I will not answer; twice, but I will proceed no further.'"

O'Connor realizes the five verses in "Revelation" in the context of Mrs. Turpin's negligence as an echo of her question that demolishes her self-image as a Job:

"The color of everything, field and crimson sky, burned for a moment with a transparent intensity. The question carried over the pasture and across the highway and the cotton field and returned to her clearly like an answer beyond the wood."

Imitating the Book of Job, "She opened her mouth but no sound came out of it." Immediately, the woman's thoughts turn to the possibility of punishment, as she watches Claud's truck filled with their black workers and thinks of them all being killed in a collision with a bigger truck. There are minutes of silence with "all her muscles rigid" until Claud returns home safely.

==== Leviathan liberates Ruby Turpin after she ends her faith in predestination ====
"Revelation" has been characterized as one of Flannery O'Connor's "Protestant conversion tales" where a "pre-conversion state" is "succeeded by an instantaneous conversion [to Catholicism] affected by grace alone at the conclusion". To fulfill O'Connor's notion of Catholic fiction, she has Ruby Turpin reject her faith in predestination.

Immediately prior to the start of her vision (and after Claud safely returns home), in her apparent relief and humbled by the realization she is imperfect, Ruby Turpin contemplates with her pigs while standing over them (the same perspective as God's) and "with her gaze bent to them as if she were absorbing some abysmal life-giving knowledge". The knowledge is an understanding of the Bible story, Job, she had just recalled. After Job learns that it was wrong to question God in Job chapter 40, in chapter 41 God tells Job of the beast Leviathan. The "abysmal life-giving knowledge" is that Mary Grace was right – Ruby Turpin is sinfully proud and she is from Hell because "all the sons of pride" are ruled by Leviathan, a creature from the abyss that is the sea. She realizes she can cease to be wicked through her own actions rather than being "made" wicked by the hands of Jesus. (The notion came to her earlier in her rage when she believed God has selected black people for salvation rather than her own kind: "'Or you could have made me a nigger. It's too late for me to be a nigger,' she said with deep sarcasm, 'but I could act like one.'") The protagonist's belief that she is responsible for her own fate represents a rejection of predestination and allows Leviathan to "perish" the day Mrs. Turpin was born. She is reborn as a woman who understands she can make choices that can lead to or deny her salvation. She still is misguided about who God has chosen for salvation. Her vision is presented to guide her toward redemption.

==== Ruby Turpin is abased for her wicked pride ====
The imagery O'Connor uses for Ruby Turpin's vision from the pig parlor starts as a result of the awesome magical power of Leviathan. Leviathan is still on the loose because the water hose she uses to clean the pig parlor is still running. The vision reflects Job 40:31–32:

- For the pig parlor that still has water running through it: "He [Leviathan] makes the deep boil like a pot; he makes the sea like a pot of ointment." (Job 41:31). The ointment is what causes them to "pant with a secret life".
- For the sky above Ruby Turpin: "Behind him [Leviathan] he leaves a shining wake; one would think the deep to be white-haired." (Job 41:32)

The vision in the sky provides Ruby Turpin lessons about pride she will never forget. O'Connor quite plainly realized lessons are to be taught from Job chapter 40 where God speaks as a whirlwind and directs Job to:

"Adorn yourself with majesty and dignity; clothe yourself with glory and splendor. Pour the overflowings of your anger, and look on everyone who is proud and abase him. Look on everyone who is proud and bring him low and tread down the wicked where they stand. Hide them all in the dust together; bind their faces in the world below. Then will I also acknowledge to you that your own right hand can save you." (Job 40:10–14)

Ruby Turpin's vision abases her as she sees people like herself set on fire as they ascend to Heaven while the "trash" she detests ascends first with their souls cleansed yet still intact. With respect the judgments on ascent with or without purgation, O'Connor famously wrote in a 1958 letter in defense of an "irreligious" friend: "We are judged by how hard we use what we have been given. Success means nothing to the Lord, nor gracefullness." This narrative is essentially written into the 1964 story as part of Mrs. Turpin's vision that goes beyond instilling the virtues of piety, humility, and fear of God. By the end of "Revelation", the vision is an epiphany as Ruby Turpin admits to a grave spiritual error that social status, physical appearances, and wealth have nothing to do with the prospect for salvation. As the protagonist returns to her house from the pig parlor in the growing darkness, she recognizes her shameful misguided righteousness and oppressive beliefs as she is stranded on Earth while she hears others ascend to Heaven. In the context of O'Connor's notion of Catholic fiction, "Revelation" only concludes with the hope that Ruby Turpin will use her free will to receive grace for the rest of her life.

==== Ruby Turpin's vision includes reminders of Jesus' teachings ====
The vision Mrs. Turpin views from her pig parlor alludes to Bible parables familiar to faithful Christians that can strike-down and replace faulty spiritual beliefs and aim her away from further sin toward redemption. The vision is also a moral lesson for the protagonist in that the scene reveals an eschatological order that is the opposite of what she expects, totally undermining her sense of position in Southern society.

Mrs. Turpin is further abased in that the people she regards as the bottom of the Southern social classes ascend to Heaven first and hers ascends last. The poor white people, black people, freaks and lunatics who ascend first are portrayed as Christian soldiers that appear in disorderly "companies", "bands", and "battalions". The abasement directly addresses the protagonist's obsession with race and social status. The biblical references that include "first will be last" are all from the New Testament: "The Parable of the Workers in the Vineyard" (Matthew 20:1–16); "Jesus and the rich young man" (Mark 10:17–31, Matthew 19:16–30, and Luke 18:18–30); and "The Narrow Door" (Luke 13:22–30). As a committed Christian and church-goer, Mrs. Turpin is supposed to know all three stories, though she may have forgotten or ignored the lessons, or was taught that one or more is supererogatory, particularly "Jesus and the Rich Young Man".

- In "The Parable of the Workers in the Vineyard", Jesus compares "the kingdom of Heaven" to the landowner of a vineyard who promises to pay his workers the same wages for a day's labor no matter what time during the day the worker was hired. One lesson of the parable is that all workers are considered equally worthy (measured by their earnings) to enter Heaven no matter how long they have labored. The lesson contrasts with Mrs. Turpin's belief that some people are always more worthy than others (i.e., there always will be a top and bottom rail).
- In "Jesus and the Rich Young Man", a wealthy young man asks Jesus what he must do to attain eternal life and Jesus tells the young man to follow God's commandments, sell all his possessions and give to the poor to have treasure in heaven, and to follow him. The young man leaves Jesus "sorrowful, for he had great possessions" (Matthew 19:22). The parable is especially memorable for Matthew 19:24: "... it is easier for a camel to go through the eye of a needle than for a rich person to enter the kingdom of God." At the pig parlor, Ruby Turpin stands on a knoll amid her and Claud's wealth – house, land, a cotton field, and livestock – that sustains their social status and economic security but fails to address the spiritual requirement to help others that Jesus asked of the rich young man.
- In "The Narrow Door", the door representing the gateway to Heaven, Jesus is asked, "Lord, will those who are saved be few?" and he responds: "Strive to enter through the narrow door. For many, I tell you, will seek to enter and will not be able." Jesus goes on to say that even some people who "ate and drank" in his presence and others whom he taught in the streets will be refused entry. Jesus also says, "And people will come from east and west, and from north and south, and recline at table in the kingdom of God."(Luke 13:29) The meaning of "narrow door" with respect to the criteria used to judge who and who will not be allowed into Heaven is one of the most controversial in Christianity. However, it is quite clear that all people, not just Jews, will be allowed to pass through the narrow door. The parable is consistent with Mrs. Turpin's vision in that it warns that she should not be so confident about being saved since faith in Jesus alone may not be sufficient striving for redemption, and that people of all races and classes will enter Heaven while she may not be allowed in.

The first two parables point to Ruby Turpin's lack of concern for others, or, equivalently, her extreme vanity – a focus on self-love. Her consciously blocking-out of her own religion's spiritual calls to love and help others is portrayed by the "blanks" in the gospel song that precedes Mary Grace's attack. The lyrics are derived from "You Go to Your Church and I'll Go to Mine" published just after the start of the Great Depression in 1930 by radio personality Phillips Haynes Lord for his fictional character, clergyman and backwoods philosopher Seth Parker, that emanate from the waiting room radio:, here with the lyrics that have been "blanked-out":

You go to blank blank (your church)
And I'll go to mine
But we'll all blank (walk) along
To-gether-ther,
And all along the blank (road)
We'll hep each other out
Smile-ling in any kind of
Weath-ther!

The pig parlor setting for Mrs. Turpin's tirades at God allude to the "Parable of the Prodigal Son" that appears in Luke 15:11–32. The parable is the story of a father and his two sons. The younger son squanders his father's gift of the inheritance he would have received upon the father's death. The younger son is so destitute that he takes employment as a swineherd though he still starves as he craves for the food fed to the pigs. He returns to his father to work as a servant but before he can explain that he is not worthy of being his son, his father welcomes his return by giving him expensive gifts and a celebratory welcome. The older son, who was at work in the fields, is told of the celebration for the return of his younger brother and is angered by the idea of celebrating a corrupt man and the lack of fatherly attention for himself. The father explains to his older son,: "'Son, you are always with me, and all that is mine is yours. It was fitting to celebrate and be glad, for this your brother was dead, and is alive; he was lost, and is found.'"Luke 15:31–32 The parable for Mrs. Turpin, in which God is represented by the father, is about the God's unending love for all his children (represented by his sons), and forgiveness for those who acknowledge their lack of worthiness that is the essence of the sacramental grace of reconciliation for Roman Catholics. As instruction, the parable reminds Mrs. Turpin that she must confess her sins and ask for forgiveness.

=== A meeting with God and St. Cyril's dragon ===
Flannery O'Connor's moral theme of "Revelation" about sin, particularly the sin of pride, committed after baptism uses the image of a serpent mentioned in a Catechetical lecture that appears in an epigraph for her short story "A Good Man Is Hard to Find" that was published the month following her death in the 1964 collection Three by Flannery O'Connor. The epigraph was derived from item 16 of the Prologue of St. Cyril of Jerusalem's Procatechesis. The epigraph is:

"'The dragon is by the side of the road, watching those who pass. Beware lest he devour you. We go to the father of souls, but it is necessary to pass by the dragon.' — St. Cyril of Jerusalem."

Item 16 of the Prologue describes the importance of baptism and identifies a serpent that lies in wait to attack the baptized, encounters that lead to spiritual impediments to one's salvation. According to the Prologue, individuals have the responsibility to guard their own soul against the serpent's attacks to stay on the metaphorical path toward salvation that began with baptism, and in particular, warns about entering into water, the realm of "the dragon of the sea who is laying these plots against you". Mrs. Turpin's soul has been devoured and is captive in the dragon's kingdom. The scene at the pig parlor from the perspective of St. Cyril's metaphor is an anagogue of the meeting of Mrs. Turpin's soul (the wart hog from Hell), God in Heaven (the Sun), and Leviathan (the watery snake) as king of the proud plotting to keep Mrs. Turpin's in its abysmal hell. The item reads:

"Great is the Baptism that lies before you: a ransom to captives; a remission of offenses; a death of sin; a new-birth of the soul; a garment of light; a holy indissoluble seal; a chariot to heaven; the delight of Paradise; a welcome into the kingdom; the gift of adoption! But there is a serpent by the wayside watching those who pass by: beware lest he bite you with unbelief. He sees so many receiving salvation, and is seeking whom he may devour. You are coming in unto the Father of Spirits, but you are going past that serpent. How then may you pass him? Have your feet shod with the preparation of the gospel of peace; that even if he bite, he may not hurt you. Have faith in-dwelling, stedfast hope, a strong sandal, that you may pass the enemy, and enter the presence of your Lord. Prepare your own heart for reception of doctrine, for fellowship in holy mysteries. Pray more frequently, that God may make you worthy of the heavenly and immortal mysteries. Cease not day nor night: but when sleep is banished from your eyes, then let your mind be free for prayer. And if you find any shameful thought rise up in your mind, turn to meditation upon Judgment to remind you of Salvation. Give your mind wholly to study, that it may forget base things. If you find any one saying to you, Are you then going in, to descend into the water? Has the city just now no baths? Take notice that it is the dragon of the sea who is laying these plots against you. Attend not to the lips of the talker, but to God who works in you. Guard your own soul, that thou be not ensnared, to the end that abiding in hope you may become an heir of everlasting salvation."

== Symbolism ==
=== Grotesques ===
As Southern Gothic fiction, "Revelation" includes numerous grotesque symbols that contribute toward characterization of its characters as grotesques – either physically or spiritually or both.

==== The doctor's waiting room ====
The doctor's waiting room is the setting for exhibiting the interactions between a cross section of early 1960s white Southern society that is implicitly being forced to experience the struggles by and for black Americans to attain social, economic, and political equality. The "crumbling social order" referred to by Hilton Als is realized in "Revelation" as the exhibition for the maladies of Southern society. As summarized by Gilbert H. Muller the scene is a "cultural grotesque" of deformities:

"Assembled in this almost claustrophic office are representative diseases of the body, the mind, and the spirit: the crippled bodies of the aged, the maimed intelligences of the poor and the neuroses of the intellectually gifted, and the defective souls of the self-righteous. Their illnesses represent the maladies of society, and the traits of this society are progressively revealed to the point where the absurdity implicit in the characters' behavior must explode."

The waiting room with its radio permeating the space with gospel songs that could make it a place for both physical and spiritual healing is defiled by overt hate, resentment, and the lack of compassion for the infirm. Ironically, Ruby Turpin's neck in the hands of Mary Grace in the waiting room makes spiritual healing possible after the woman accepts Mary Grace's judgment on her soul. However, as a place for the protagonist's damning and condescending judgments, the congested, unadorned, box-like waiting room becomes a realization of the box car in her dreams that is crammed with damned people being delivered to a gas oven, which is the undoing of the status quo.

==== The Holocaust ====
As part of the examination of Ruby Turpin in the waiting room, her inner thoughts "at night naming classes people" within her social universe and subsequently dreaming the classes "all crammed in together in a box car, being ridden off to be put in a gas oven" is a vision of the Holocaust that is grotesque and horrifying in its composition. Mrs. Turpin's process to order her society by race and class starts to breakdown when she considers black land owners or "common" white people wealthier than her family, and then it collapses when she has to consider "a colored dentist in town who had two red Lincolns and a swimming pool and a farm with registered white-face cattle on it". The effort ends so Ruby Turpin can maintain her "peace of mind" to secure in her own mind her high social status and worthiness for salvation that is reflected later in the story by her gratitude to Jesus for "making everything the way it is", her in inability to find any fault in herself that would justify condemnation to Purgatory, and her confidence that she's "a rail on top". As a vision of the Holocaust, the protagonist's peace of mind is secured by the belief that she is one of the few selected by God for eternal life, and that most other people, consequently, will be judged by God for delivery to Hell.

==== A hog as a human condition ====
Hogs are used throughout "Revelation" as a metaphor for piggish aspects of the human condition represented by the repetitive appearance of the sentence "A-gruntin and a-rootin and a-groanin." The sentence is first used by a poor white woman in waiting room as name-calling Ruby Turpin a pig as a sign of resentment from the protagonist's condescending brag about her wealth and superiority as demonstrated by her clean hog livestock and Mrs. Turpin's expectation that her sick boy should make room for her on the waiting room's couch. However, its use in name-calling reflects a darker condition – the animal and its piggishness is a metaphor for the oppressive forces that are used to deny the humanity of poor whites, black people, freaks, and lunatics. Ruby Turpin's understanding of poor whites and people as pigs is comically black – pigs are as intelligent as people, even performing as astronauts, but they will die of a heart attack if they are put upright like real people since they have to be on all fours to survive stupidly doing their "a-gruntin and a-rootin and a-groanin".

The protagonist considers cleanliness as a virtue, and its opposite, filth, as evil. She uses her perception of cleanliness to judge a person's social position as well as their prospects for salvation. In particular, she applies "cleanliness next to Godliness" to black and poor white people, whom she categorically detests because she considers them filthy. However, neither cleanliness nor purity is a Christian virtue, and New Testament stories such as Jesus cleansing a leper and Jesus healing the bleeding woman tell of divine love for the unclean. As a story of divine judgment, O'Connor mocks and abases her protagonist by using her fake Christian virtue against the character, using Jesus' criterion in Matthew 7:1–2: "Judge not, that you be not judged. For with the judgment you pronounce you will be judged, and with the measure you use it will be measured to you." Mary Grace reveals the judgment against Mrs. Turpin using the measure of cleanliness – the woman is an "old wart hog".

The pig has two roles during the protagonist's darkest moments. The first role appears when Ruby Turpin's confidence in her own salvation is completely undermined. Her mind concludes that poor white and black people have been elected for salvation instead of her, so, in a desperate attempt to recover her redemption, she tells God that she could act like the people she detests by emulating the filthy, stupid pigs they are: "Lounge about the sidewalks all day drinking root beer. Dip snuff and spit in every puddle and have it all over my face."; and, "Lay down in the middle of the road and stop traffic. Roll on the ground". O'Connor uses the pregnant sow with her offspring in her pig parlor to explain how Mrs. Turpin got these hateful and oppressive ideas — they were passed down from generations before her, taught to her by her parents' generation. The second role is in the pig parlor when Ruby Turpin realizes Mary Grace was right in that she is a "wart hog from hell", a wild demon "a-gruntin and a-rootin and a-groanin" through life, comically standing amid her own kind that "pant with a secret life" in Leviathan's kingdom as the "sons of pride" bathed in Leviathan's ointment that the Turpins apply daily to, ironically, remove filth.

==== "When I looked up and He looked down" ====
"When I Looked Up and He Looked Down" is the title of a gospel song composed by Albert E. Brumley that refers to the singer as a repented sinner who looks up to God with God looking down on her. The singer is confident that her changed behavior will achieve redemption and so she sings the line "And one these days I know I'll wear a crown" — the line Mrs. Turpin sings in her mind just before she looks down at the shoes of everyone in the waiting room, a metaphor for her condescending and disparaging judgements for everyone in the room except for Mary Grace's mother. The protagonist singing the song with sincerity makes a mockery of its meaning because Ruby Turpin, prior to her pig parlor visit, doesn't look up to anyone or anything, including God. As a baptized Reformed Protestant, she is in union with God, and she feels sufficiently righteous to give God advise and make a prayer to God thanking him for not making her like the people that surround her in the waiting room.

=== Water and fire ===
In her works, O'Connor said, "Water is a symbol of purification and fire is another. Water, it seems to me, is a symbol of the kind of purification that God gives irrespective of our efforts or worthiness, and fire is the kind of purification we bring on ourselves — as in Purgatory. It is our evil which is naturally burnt away when it comes anywhere near God."

As Mrs. Turpin's revelation pronounced her a hog, she is a baptized one and nothing more because for Catholics, baptism does not result in the forgiveness of sins committed after baptism. The story's image of a "watery snake" in the water used for baptism alludes to the danger to one who believes she can become righteous only because she has been baptized because the righteous place themselves above others, and thus become a subject of Leviathan, king over all the sons of pride, rather than God, a lesson from the Book of Job O'Connor applies to Christians.

In the vision of souls like herself ascending to Heaven, Ruby Turpin witnesses their purgation by their "shocked and altered faces that even their virtues were being burned away". While scholars disagree on the spiritual meanings of the purgatorial vision, O'Connor said "She [Ruby Turpin] gets the vision. Wouldn't have been any point in that story if she hadn't. ...And that vision is purgatorial."

=== Christian soldiers ===
In Ruby Turpin's vision from her pig palor, she witnesses whole "companies of white-trash", "bands of black niggers", and "battalions of freaks and lunatics" ascend to Heaven in an image of joyous, disorderly Christian soldiers (miles Christianus) that contrasts with the orderly, marching, burning "tribe" of her own kind. As "Christian soldiers" were people who provided vigorous and dedicated service to the establishment of the first Christian churches as characterized in the Pauline epistles, the image of them in "Revelation" is used as an abasement of Ruby Turpin to indicate her deficient commitment to serve her church in comparison with those much less privileged than her in spite of what she believes about herself.

=== White robes ===
The white robes worn by black people ascending to Heaven alludes to the Book of Revelation chapter 7 where God gives "Praise of the Great Multitude of the Redeemed. People in white robes are identified in Revelation 7:14 as: "... the ones coming out of the great tribulation. ...They have washed their robes and made them white in the blood of the Lamb." (The Lamb is Jesus Christ; and the great tribulation is an apocalytic event — a period of worldwide hardships, persecution, disasters, famine, war, pain, and suffering, mentioned by Jesus in the Olivet Discourse as a sign that would occur in the end time.) In "Revelation", black people wear white robes ascending to Heaven are praised for their living during times of their persecution and oppression because of their race.

=== Strength, courage and faith ===
O'Connor described Ruby Turpin as "a country female Jacob" in a letter saying, "You got to be a very big woman to shout at the Lord across a hogpen." From the story in the Book of Genesis 32:22–32, Jacob wrestles God embodied as an angel. Jacob and the angel wrestle all night, and after the angel surrenders it wounds Jacob by dislocating his hip and accedes to Jacob's demand for a blessing. In "Revelation", Mary Grace wounds Mrs. Turpin with a book and attacks her, and then is defeated by succumbing to restraint and sedation. After the attack, Ruby Turpin asks Mary Grace for a revelation and receives what appears to be a curse for which the woman considers a blessing, a sign of the strength of her faith in God. Jacob's physical strength is a metaphor for Ruby Turpin's courage even though it may have been fostered by over-confidence. By courageously demanding answers from God about her predicament, Ruby Turpin gains a response in the form of the vision from the hogpen. The story ends with the hope that she will use her courage to gain her redemption since the lesson of the vision is that the baptized may be subjected to purgation for their sins before ascending to Heaven, a doctrine of the Roman Catholic Church.

=== Rising and convergence ===
==== The highway and bridge in the sky ====
As "Revelation" alludes to the Bible story of Jacob, the protagonist's vision from her pig parlor recalls Jacob's Ladder. The author, who at the time "Revelation" was being drafted was disabled by lupus and required crutches to walk, has her characters ascend skyward on a bridge. The purple bridge on which the souls of the dead traverse to Heaven through a field of fire is an extension of the lavender-colored highway that carries the souls of the living (for example, Claud and his workers in his truck). The junction of the highway and bridge is a metaphor for the moment of death. The bridge is a realization of Particular Judgment that Catholics believe occurs immediately after death that involves the cleansing and purification of souls. The colors of the highway and bridge likely reflect the liturgical colors assigned by the Second Vatican Council which was proceeding at the time of O'Connor's death, violet or purple is for the Sacrament of Reconciliation for the living, and is allowed for the Requiem Mass for the dead.

==== Hope and grace ====
The protagonist's tribe ascent skyward in Ruby Turpin's vision is a message of hope for her salvation because she has not committed what a Catholic would consider mortal sin. In Catholic theology, justification is a life-long process of advancing toward salvation, i.e., "rising", where all souls converge to face God's judgment after death, where "O'Connor believes that only in death is our life weighed in the balances and our destiny eternally fixed." The progress of Ruby Turpin's soul for achieving salvation to be with God is consistent with the title of the book Everything That Rises Must Converge, which coincides with the what Ralph Wood emphasized as the "central premise of her work" – "the conviction that the ultimate issue of our lives depends on our own reception or rejection of grace".

==== Revelation ====
"Revelation" is a product of Flannery O'Conner's anagogical vision. The medieval anagoge interpretive process is "reasoning upwards" (sursum ductio), when, from the visible, the invisible action is disclosed or revealed, such as the message delivered by Mary Grace as divine grace instead of a curse, and Ruby Turpin's acceptance of the message as divine grace through realizations of the Book of Job. In addition, each anagogical method of interpretation points in a different direction – the literal/historical backward to the past, the allegoric forward to the future, the tropological downward to the moral/human, and the anagogic upwards to the spiritual/heavenly.

== See also ==
- Liturgical colors
- Particular Judgment
- Predestination
- Sacrament of Reconciliation
- Southern gothic literature
