= Greta Gaines =

American actress and singer

Greta Gaines is an American singer, songwriter, and cannabis rights activist, who became prominent competitor in the early years of the development of snowboarding as a sport.

== Activism ==
Gaines is active in the legalization of cannabis in the United States. She owns and operates The Hempery, and is an outspoken supporter of Women Grow.

She sits on the advisory board of NORML.

== Personal life ==
Greta is the daughter of novelist, screenwriter and outdoorsman Charles Gaines, author of Pumping Iron, and Stay Hungry, and inventor of the game of Paintball. Her mother is painter, sculptor and former Miss Alabama contestant, Patricia Ellisor Gaines, and her brothers are artist Shelby Gaines and actor Latham Gaines. She was previously married to musician Bucky Baxter.

She graduated from Georgetown University.

== Snowboarding, sports, television and musical career ==
In the early years of snowboard development she began using a prototype created by designer Jake Burton Carpenter, and was the only female participant in the first World Extreme Snowboard Championship in 1992, competing against 19 men, and thus, by default, the first Women's champion in that sport.

In 1997 she began hosting MTV’s Sports and Music Festival, and her song "Mikey Likes It" was used as the show's theme song. In 1999 the Oxygen Network created Freeride with Greta Gaines. She later hosted ESPN 2's "Basscenter" and "The New American Sportsman."

She released her first album of music, Greta Gaines, in 1999. Her song "Firefly" received extensive radio play and rose to the tops of the MP3.com charts, after which she performed at Lilith Fair with Sheryl Crow and Sarah McLachlan, and had gigs opening shows for Tori Amos and Alanis Morissette.
