= Greenleaf (short story) =

Short story by Flannery O'Connor

- Short story by Flannery O'Connor
- Country: United States
- Language: English
- Genre: Southern Gothic

Publication
- Published in: The Kenyon Review
- Publication type: Literary journal
- Publisher: Kenyon College
- Media type: Print (magazine)
- Publication date: Summer 1956

"Greenleaf" is a short story by Flannery O'Connor. It was originally published in the Summer 1956 issue of The Kenyon Review and republished in 1965 in O'Connor's posthumous short story collection Everything That Rises Must Converge. The story won O'Connor her first O. Henry Award first prize in 1957 for the year's best American short story. In the story, a snobbish landlady who believes in her family's genetic and cultural superiority struggles to understand why the children of her lower-class tenants have become more successful than her own children. The upwards mobility of her tenants' children reflects the gradual weakening of the Southern social class system.

== Plot summary ==
Mrs. May owns a struggling dairy farm and employs Mr. Greenleaf, a tenant worker, to help her run it. She is rude to Mr. Greenleaf, due to her social snobbery and insecurity. She also resents Mr. Greenleaf's wife, who she considers white trash. The two women disagree about faith: Mrs. May attends church but does not believe in God, while Mrs. Greenleaf is a devout Charismatic Christian who practices faith healing. During one of Mrs. Greenleaf's healing sessions, she colorfully calls out for Jesus to stab her in the heart. Mrs. May finds the episode ridiculous, and it is implied that the incident prompts her to buy an insurance policy, which contrasts with Mrs. Greenleaf’s reliance on God.

Mrs. May is insecure because the May and Greenleaf families are headed in different directions. The Greenleaf twins, O.T. and E.T., are upwardly mobile: they distinguished themselves in World War II, married respectable French women, and used the G.I. Bill and military pensions to go to college and start their own competing dairy farm. Mrs. May is disappointed by her two sons: Wesley teaches at a second-rate university and hates his job, and Scofield sells insurance to African Americans, which Mrs. May considers undignified. Neither goes to church, neither is married, and while both still live with their mother, neither helps with the farm. In addition, Scofield's wartime record was unremarkable, and Wesley never fought due to a medical deferment.

Mrs. May does not understand why her children are less successful than the Greenleaf twins, whose lineage is not as impressive. She admits that the twins are formidable, but also blames the change on the government and Mr. Greenleaf's incompetence. She tells herself that she is working hard to save the farm and her sons are throwing it away. Her sons are aware of her contempt and enjoy teasing her back.

One day, Mrs. May is upset to find a stray bull on her property. She is worried that the bull will breed with her milk cows, introducing undesirable genes into her herd. She blames Mr. Greenleaf, who appears reluctant to confront the bull, for letting the bull onto the property and failing to get rid of it. When Scofield points out that O.T. and E.T. own the bull, Mrs. May visits the Greenleaf farm to demand that they find the bull and bring it back. During her visit, she is upset to see that the twins' farm is modern and thriving. The twins' farmhand explains that the bull has a reputation for aggressive behavior.

The twins do not retrieve the bull, so Mrs. May badgers Mr. Greenleaf to hunt down and kill it. She eventually realizes that the bull is dangerous and might attack Mr. Greenleaf, but reassures herself that even if he is injured or killed, her insurance will cover it. She honks impatiently, but this infuriates the bull, which emerges from the forest and gores Mrs. May in the heart. Mr. Greenleaf shoots the bull, but it is too late. As she dies, the story notes that she has "the look of a person whose sight has been suddenly restored but who finds the light unbearable."

== Analysis ==
O'Connor once wrote that the bull was "the pleasantest character in [her] story." Some writers suggest that the bull symbolizes Christ, although others have linked it to two myths with pagan underpinnings: the Greek myth of Europa (a woman stolen by a god disguised as a bull), and the concept of the Holy Hunt of the Unicorn (the latter being an originally pagan story adapted for Christian audiences).

The story also contrasts secular insurance with religious belief, where insurance falsely promises "a secular, materialistic salvation". In this sense, the bull represents "a force she is unable to identify and against which ... no insurance protection exists." In addition, O'Connor implicitly accuses Mrs. May of hypocrisy for criticizing her son for selling insurance to black customers while buying insurance herself.
