= Shelby Gaines =

American composer, musician and writer

- Born: Shelby Shook Gaines; New Hampshire, United States
- Known for: Musician, composer, writer
- Spouse: Megan Sheekey
- Website: www.gainesart.com

Shelby Shook Gaines is an American composer, musician, and writer. He is the son of novelist Charles Gaines and artist Patricia Ellisor Gaines.

== Early life and music career ==
Gaines was born and raised in New Hampshire, and has two siblings, Latham Gaines and Greta Gaines. He studied music at Brown University.

He began working in music production and sound design in the mid-1990s in San Francisco and later New York City. He played steel pan professionally and briefly toured with the Trinidad-based Our Boys Steel Orchestra. Gaines produced and co-wrote for other artists, while writing and recording his own music (under his name as well as his middle name, Shook). His song "Aquaworld" was included on Accidental Records' compilation You Are Here. Gaines' most frequent music collaborator in New York was guitarist Kareem "Jesus" Devlin.

== Film score, screenwriting, theater and visual art ==
Gaines later moved into performance and visual art, composing ballet scores, often in collaboration with his brother, Latham Gaines, (an art-music duo known as GAINES). The brothers create sound sculptures from found materials, which are then used for film scoring, performance and art exhibits. Their live score for Ethan Hawke's revival of Sam Shepard's A Lie of the Mind earned them a Drama Desk Award nomination. Other theater work includes the creation of instruments and the music for Clive, Jonathan Marc Sherman's play, directed by Ethan Hawke.

Shelby Gaines was the sound producer for Blaze, based on the life of musician Blaze Foley, starring Ben Dickey, Alia Shawkat, Sam Rockwell, Steve Zahn, Kris Kristofferson, and Richard Linklater.

He and his brother scored the 2019 film The Kid, directed by Vincent D'Onofrio and starring Hawke, Chris Pratt, Dane DeHaan, Leila George and Jake Schur. In 2023 they composed the music for Wildcat, a film about American novelist Flannery O'Connor that was also co-written by Shelby Gaines and Ethan Hawke.

Gaines co-wrote the screenplay for The Weight with Matthew Booi, starring Russell Crowe, Ethan Hawke and Julia Jones, and he composed the film's music with Latham Gaines.
