= The Geranium =

Short story by Flannery O'Connor

- Short story by Flannery O'Connor
- Country: United States
- Language: English
- Genre: Southern Gothic

Publication
- Published in: Accent
- Publication type: Journal
- Publication date: Summer 1946

"The Geranium" is an early short story by Flannery O'Connor. It was originally published in 1946 in Accent: A Quarterly of New Literature and is one of the six stories included in O'Connor's 1947 master's thesis The Geranium: A Collection of Short Stories. It was later republished in O'Connor's posthumous anthology The Complete Stories (1971). In the story, an aging white Southerner moves to New York City, where he realizes that unlike the Jim Crow South, the local blacks treat him as their social equal. His loss of relative status accentuates his growing sense of inferiority and powerlessness.

O'Connor was fond of the story and attempted to rework it several times as her skills matured. However, she approved only one of those revisions – "Judgement Day" – for publication during her lifetime. She completed "Judgement Day" one month before her death in August 1964, and it was included as the final story of her posthumous collection Everything That Rises Must Converge (1965).

In 1993, four versions of the story – "The Geranium", "An Exile in the East" (1954), "Getting Home" (1964), and "Judgement Day" – were published together in Flannery O'Connor: The Growing Craft.

== Plot summary ==
Dudley, an aging Southerner, lives with his daughter in New York City. Every day, he looks forward to the moment when his neighbor puts his geranium on his windowsill. The homesick Dudley muses to himself that the South grows better geraniums.

Dudley remembers that out of filial piety, his daughter brought him to New York because of his financial difficulties back home. He has difficulty adjusting to the North, with its population density, lack of space, and unfamiliar subway system. He remains nostalgic for the South, where he was a respected male figure and got along with the local blacks – but only if they were socially inferior to him.

Dudley is perplexed by the status of blacks in the North. When he sees a well-dressed black man, he assumes the man must be a wealthy neighbor's servant. He is appalled to learn that the man is going to live in their apartment building. He urges his daughter to move away, but she responds that they cannot afford to live anywhere else and advises him to not antagonize the local blacks. While daydreaming about going hunting with his black servant in the South, he runs into his new black neighbor, who kindly helps him go up the stairs, but unintentionally infuriates Dudley by treating him as his social equal.

After returning to his apartment, Dudley calls out to his geranium-owning neighbor, asking why the geranium is not on the windowsill that day. The neighbor explains that the geranium fell out the window and rudely tells him that his windowsill is none of Dudley's business. Still stewing about the black neighbor, Dudley resolves to go down the stairs and retrieve the geranium, but lacks the strength to do so. Consumed by self-pity about his newfound powerlessness, he returns to his apartment.

== Critical reception ==
Criticism of the story is mixed. Lite Reads Review states, "I think The Geranium by Flannery O’Connor is an incredibly mixed bag. The symbolism and style both work so well that I want to love it, but I would also much rather read stories about racism from the perspective of those it targets than those who perpetrate it.". Tim Lieder also notes the racism but concentrates on the mechanics of the work with "there's a lot of exposition because this story is 90% exposition about how he moved to New York City because his daughter insisted. His son-in-law doesn't like him and he used to go fishing and even had a guide who knew the river" and also notes that the University of Iowa writing style tends to emphasize character sketches without judgment.
