= Charles Gaines (writer) =

American writer and outdoorsman (1942–2026)

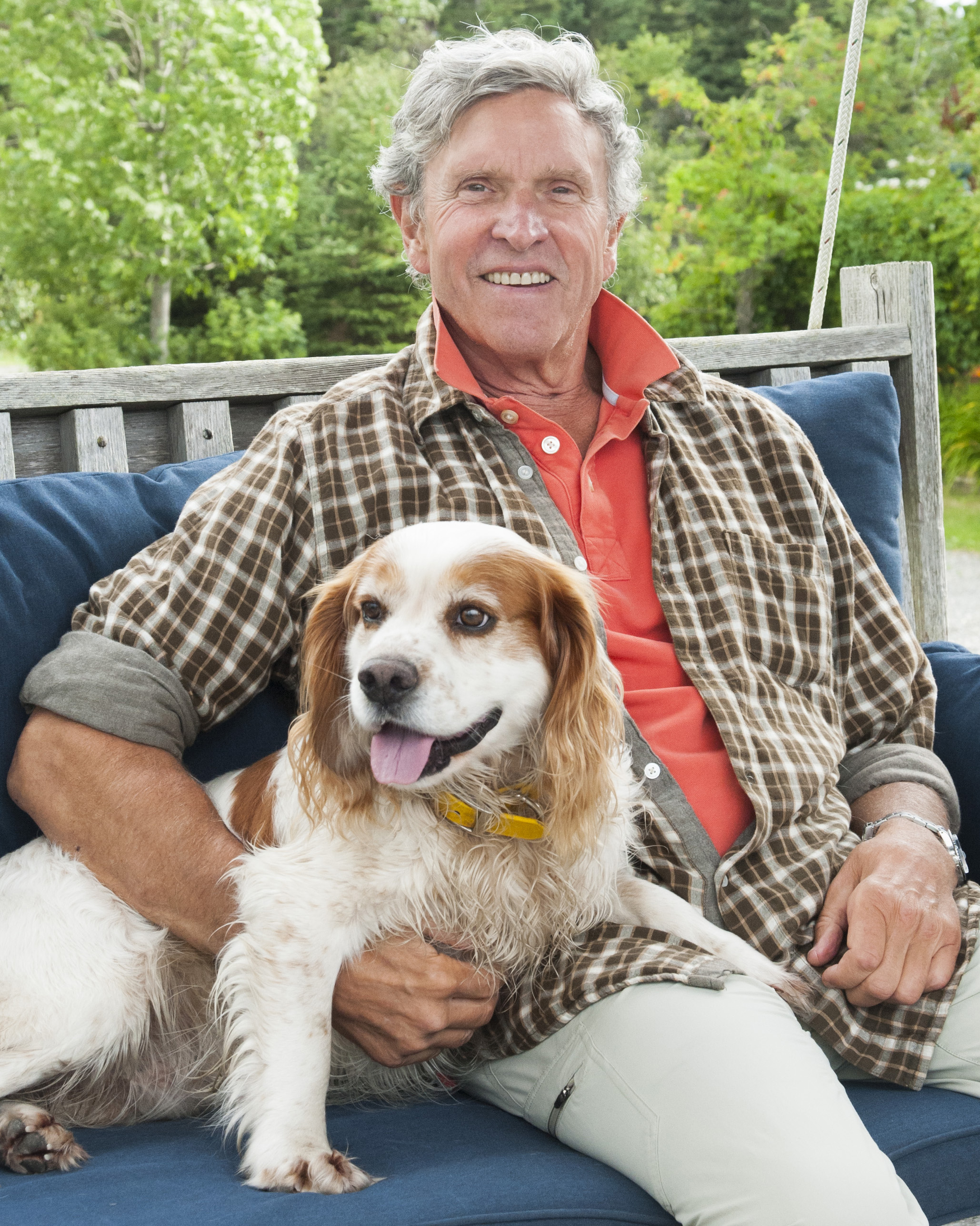
- Gaines with his dog, Sumo, in 2014
- Born: Charles Latham Gaines III; January 6, 1942; Jacksonville, Florida, U.S.
- Died: July 21, 2026 (aged 84); Monastery, Nova Scotia, Canada
- Occupations: Writer, outdoorsman
- Spouse: Patricia Ellisor (m. 1963)
- Children: Shelby; Latham; Greta

Charles Latham Gaines III (January 6, 1942 – July 21, 2026) was an American writer and outdoorsman, notable for numerous works in both the fiction and non-fiction genres. His writing most typically concerns the outdoors sports of fishing in general and fly fishing in particular, as well as upland bird hunting and mountaineering, often with an intellectual and philosophical bent, and an eye towards the various cultures and traditions surrounding different forms of fishing around the world.

In addition to his outdoors writings, Gaines covered the "Golden Age" of professional bodybuilding and is the co-author (with George Butler, who did the photography) of Pumping Iron: The Art and Sport of Bodybuilding (1974), considered the definitive journalistic work in that field, and credited with bringing greater awareness to a specialized subculture, as well as helping to launch the career of Arnold Schwarzenegger. Gaines also narrated and contributed to the documentary film of the same name.

Gaines was active in the conservation movement and in particular the stewardship of the North American Atlantic Salmon fisheries. He served on the board of directors of the Atlantic Salmon Federation.

He was also the co-creator of the sport of paintball, following a discussion about whether or not a person who lived primarily in a city could survive in the wilderness.

== Early life ==
Gaines was born in Jacksonville, Florida, on January 6, 1942, the son of Margaret (née Shook) and Charles Latham Gaines Jr. At the age of ten, he and his family moved to Birmingham, Alabama. As a teenager, Gaines took up bodybuilding. He briefly attended Washington and Lee University but left school to travel around the country. He later received his BA from Birmingham–Southern College and his MFA in writing from the University of Iowa. In 1970, he moved to New Hampshire, where he taught creative writing at New England College.

== Writing career ==
During a long and varied writing career Charles Gaines published 25 books, among them the novels Stay Hungry (later adapted into a 1976 film co-written by Gaines and director Bob Rafelson), Dangler, and Survival Games; the non-fiction international bestseller, Pumping Iron; and the award-winning memoir, A Family Place. The book Pumping Iron and a later film of the same title written and narrated by Gaines are widely credited with having introduced competitive bodybuilding and Arnold Schwarzenegger to the general public.

Gaines also wrote the scripts for two produced feature films, two award-winning feature-documentaries, and a 2-hour PBS adaptation of Edith Wharton's Summer, as well as numerous segments for ABC's American Sportsman, a show for which he also directed and produced. For his television writing he was the recipient of two Emmys, and two Cine Golden Eagle Awards.

Over more than 50 years of magazine writing, he published articles and stories in Harper's, GEO, Sports Illustrated, Town & Country, Architectural Digest, Audubon, Outdoor Life, Esquire, Men's Journal, Playboy, Garden & Gun, Field and Stream, Sports Afield, and Southern Living, among many other periodicals, and served as a contributing editor to a number of those magazines.

He was a life-long bird hunter and angler who has fished in over 20 countries and on 5 continents. His two collections of essays on angling, The Next Valley Over and Waters Far and Near, are widely considered to be among the best American books of that genre. He was a founding member of the US Fly Fishing Team, and fished as a member of that team in World Championship Fly Fishing Competitions in New Zealand and Tasmania.

Gaines was a lifetime board member of the US Fly Fishing Team, and a US National Council member of the Atlantic Salmon Federation. He was named a Distinguished Alumnus by both The Altamont School and Birmingham Southern College, and has taught periodically as an associate professor in the Graduate Creative Writing Program at Spalding University in Louisville, Kentucky. In 2018 he was inducted into the Alabama Writers Hall of Fame, and he was the 2020 recipient of the coveted Truman Capote Prize for lifetime achievement in non-fiction.

== Invention of paintball ==
In 1980, Charles Gaines and his friend Hayes Noel, a stock trader from New York City, had an argument about whether the talent for survival was an ingrained instinct adaptable to any environment (Noel), or a pattern of learned behavior specific to a particular environment (Gaines). Noel held that his ability to survive and thrive in the Wall Street jungle was transferable to a true jungle, or anywhere else. Gaines, a life-long outdoorsman, argued that while he could not compete with Noel in the city, he would be more than his match in the woods.

Gaines lived at the time on a farm in New Hampshire where he raised sheep. Shortly after the argument with Noel, a friend sent him a catalogue of products for stockmen. In it was a CO_{2}-powered pistol, made by a company called Nel-Spot, which shot a single oil-based dye pellet and was used for marking bred-ewes, and by foresters to mark trees. Seeing a way to finally test their argument, Noel and Gaines ordered two of the pistols and some pellets and hunted each other in the woods on Gaines's farm.

Doing so proved to be so exhilarating that they decided to invite ten other men to play a game they devised off the trial run, which they named "The Survival Game". The object of the game was for a player to collect each of four different-colored flags located at widely separated "flag stations" inside a large tract of woods, and to be the first player to emerge from the woods with all four flags without being marked by another player's paint pellet. Gaines enlisted his friend Bob Gurnsey, a New Hampshire ski-shop owner, to help him and Noel organize the game, and in June 1981 the three men, along with nine other friends, played the first paintball game ever played in Henniker, New Hampshire.

Among the players in that game were three writers for national magazines. All of them wrote articles about the game, and Gaines was deluged with letters from people all over the country who wanted to play the Survival Game. To meet that demand, Gaines, Noel and Gurnsey formed a company called The National Survival Game, which standardized rules for both individual and team versions of the game, and was the first company to sell paintball equipment.

== Personal life and death ==
Gaines was married to Patricia Ellisor in 1963, and had three children, Shelby, Latham and Greta. The couple resided in Nova Scotia, Canada, and Argo, Alabama. Gaines died of cancer in Monastery, Nova Scotia, on July 21, 2026, at the age of 84.
