= The Kid (2019 film) =

2019 film

- Theatrical release poster
- Directed by: Vincent D'Onofrio
- Screenplay by: Andrew Lanham
- Story by: Vincent D'Onofrio; Andrew Lanham
- Produced by: Jordan Schur; Nick Thurlow; Sam Maydew; David Mimran
- Starring: Ethan Hawke; Dane DeHaan; Jake Schur; Leila George; Adam Baldwin; Chris Pratt
- Cinematography: Matthew J. Lloyd
- Edited by: Katharine McQuerrey
- Music by: Latham Gaines; Shelby Gaines
- Production company: Mimran Schur Pictures
- Distributed by: Lionsgate
- Release date: March 8, 2019 (United States)
- Running time: 96 minutes
- Country: United States
- Language: English
- Budget: $7 million
- Box office: $1.6 million

The Kid is a 2019 American Western film directed by Vincent D'Onofrio, from a screenplay by Andrew Lanham. The film stars Ethan Hawke, Dane DeHaan, Jake Schur, Leila George, Chris Pratt, Adam Baldwin, and Vincent D'Onofrio.

The Kid was released in the United States on March 8, 2019, by Lionsgate.

== Plot ==
Young Rio Cutler kills his alcoholic and abusive father one night in an unsuccessful attempt to save his mother from being beaten to death. Grant Cutler, Rio's uncle, hears the gunshot and enters the house. Furious over his brother's murder, Grant attacks Rio, receiving a stab wound in the process. Both Rio and his sister Sara escape when Sara steals a horse before they take shelter in an abandoned shack; intending to meet their mother's friend in Santa Fe.

When they wake, they are greeted by Billy the Kid and his gang. Rio shows a picture of his mother to Billy, who reveals that he too killed his father in defence of his mother. When one of the gang goes outside to check on the horses, he is shot by Sheriff Pat Garrett and the posse who have the gang trapped in the shack. A gunfight ensues, and Garrett's posse takes the gang prisoner. Sara warns Rio not to go outside, fearing he will be hanged if he reveals he killed their father. Seeing this as a chance to get safely to Santa Fe, Rio runs outside anyway. Garrett begins to question Rio and Sara; they tell him that their mother died and while travelling to Santa Fe, they were separated from their father. Garrett seems suspicious, but takes them along.

The posse stops at a Mexican ranch where Billy sees his lover and promises to return. While Billy antagonises Garrett during dinner, Rio slips him some butter to escape from his wrist shackles and Billy threatens to kill a deputy, if not set free. Garrett produces a gun and threatens to shoot gang member Dave Rudabaugh, who Billy is still shackled to at the ankle. With no escape possible, the situation is defused. Later, Garrett tells Rio about the first man he killed and asks him if he has anything he wants to tell him, but Rio says no.

When they reach Santa Fe, Sheriff Romero insists on taking Billy into custody along with Dave. Sensing hostility, Garrett commandeers a stagecoach, and amidst an armed standoff, he leaves with Billy for Lincoln County, where Billy can stand trial. Rio and Sara slip away during the trouble and find their mother's friend in a dance hall, but Grant and his gang ambush them. He tells them their mother was a whore, and for killing his brother he's taking Sara as his whore. He turns Rio out on the street and takes Sara. Rio sees Dave about to be hanged and Dave informs Rio that Billy is also about to be hanged in Lincoln and gives him a letter from Billy, which claims he knows where Sara was taken. Rio steals a horse, gets a gun, rides to Lincoln and goes to the jail to visit Billy, but deputy Bob Olinger (Adam Baldwin) turns him away. To get into the jail, Rio half-heartedly robs a bank and is shot by another deputy. In jail, Billy plots to escape and offers to bring Rio. Garrett once again asks Rio if he has anything to tell him, again he says no, and Garrett leaves town.

Billy puts his plan in motion. He escapes by attacking his guard during a trip to the outhouse; when the guard runs, Billy shoots him. He gets the keys to his shackles and frees Rio. They steal a horse and head to the Mexican ranch; Billy promises to help find Sara, but once at the ranch, Billy finds his lover is pregnant and ignores Rio's plea for help. Garrett catches up with Billy at the ranch and kills him. Realizing Billy could not have helped him, Rio tells Garrett the truth about his father and his sister. They go to the whorehouse in Puerto de Luna and Rio looks for Sara while Garrett encounters Grant. Grant tells Garrett about a time he saw his brother engaging in incest; when he told his father, he was beaten harshly and told to keep his mouth shut. Rio emerges with Sara and Grant takes Rio hostage during a skirmish that includes gunfire and Sara shooting one of the men that raped her from her uncle's gang.

Garrett chases Grant outside, where Grant threatens to kill Rio if he isn't let go. Garrett tells Grant that witnesses will attest to how he ran off from Pat Garrett like a coward. Grant says that's not true, but Garrett says it doesn't matter what's true, it matters the story they tell when you're gone. Garrett challenges Grant to a fair gunfight, which he accepts, and tosses Rio aside. Sara emerges from the saloon suddenly, distracting Garrett. Grant makes his move, but Rio shoots him in the head. Before Garrett leaves town, he tells the siblings they have good in them and plenty of life to put to good use. As Sara and Rio ride off, Rio encourages Sara to remember what she once said to him, that it ain't wrong being afraid, you have to keep trying and keep moving until you find some goodness in life.

== Cast ==
- Ethan Hawke as Sheriff Pat Garrett
- Dane DeHaan as Billy "The Kid" Bonney
- Jake Schur as Rio Cutler
- Leila George as Sara Cutler
- Chris Pratt as Grant Cutler
- Adam Baldwin as Bob Olinger
- Vincent D'Onofrio as Sheriff Romero
- Keith Jardine as Paul Jankowski
- Chris Bylsma as Charlie Bowdre
- Clint Obenchain as Tom Pickett
- Chad Dashnaw as Dave Rudabaugh
- Charlie Chappell as Billy Wilson
- Joseph Santos as James W. Bell
- Hawk D'Onofrio as Oran Moler
- Ben Dickey as Jim East
- Jenny Gabrielle as Mirabel

== Production ==
=== Development ===
In April 2017, Vincent D'Onofrio was announced to be directing and starring in the film as Sheriff Romero. In July 2017, Dane DeHaan was cast as Billy the Kid. In August 2017, it was revealed that Chris Pratt would appear in the film. In September 2017, Jake Schur was cast in the title role.

=== Filming ===
Principal photography began in October 2017, in the Santa Fe, New Mexico area, with Matthew J. Lloyd serving as cinematographer.

== Release ==
The first trailer debuted on February 21, 2019. The Kid was released in the United States on March 8, 2019, by Lionsgate. The film was released in 268 theaters.

=== Critical response ===
On Rotten Tomatoes, the film has an approval rating of 43% based on reviews from 46 critics, with an average rating of 5.3/10. The website's critics consensus reads, "Well-framed, well-cast, and well-intentioned, The Kid still largely fails to set itself apart from the multitude of other westerns covering similar territory." On Metacritic, the film has a weighted average score of 51 out of 100 based on reviews from 15 critics, indicating "mixed or average reviews".

Joe Leydon of Variety called it "a consistently involving and often exciting drama in which the two Wild West icons are presented from the p.o.v. of an impressionable adolescent who weighs the pros and cons of each man as a role model." John DeFore of The Hollywood Reporter wrote: "The result is very pleasing, even for moviegoers who don't pine for the Western's return, and represents a big step forward in the directing career of D'Onofrio."
