= Everything That Rises Must Converge =

1965 short story collection by Flannery O'Connor

- First edition cover
- Author: Flannery O'Connor
- Language: English
- Genre: Short stories
- Publisher: Farrar Straus Giroux
- Publication date: January 1965
- Publication place: United States
- Media type: Print (hard & paperback)
- Pages: 269 pp
- ISBN: 0-374-15012-5

Everything That Rises Must Converge is a collection of nine short stories written by Flannery O'Connor during the final decade of her life. The collection was published posthumously in 1965 and contains an introduction by Robert Fitzgerald. It includes all three of O'Connor's O. Henry Award-winning stories: "Greenleaf" (1957), "Everything That Rises Must Converge" (1963), and "Revelation" (1965). In addition, it contains two stories that were published for the first time via the collection: "Parker's Back" and "Judgement Day".

== Contents ==
The collection features nine stories, seven of which were previously published:

- "Everything That Rises Must Converge" (New World Writing, 1961)
- "Greenleaf" (The Kenyon Review, Summer 1956)
- "A View of the Woods" (Partisan Review, Fall 1957)
- "The Enduring Chill" (Harper's Bazaar, July 1958)
- "The Comforts of Home" (The Kenyon Review, Autumn 1960)
- "The Lame Shall Enter First" (The Sewanee Review, Summer 1962)
- "Revelation" (The Sewanee Review, Spring 1964)
- "Parker's Back"
- "Judgement Day"

== Development ==
=== Creating the collection ===
Of the volume's nine stories, seven had been printed in magazines or literary journals prior to being collected, including three that won O. Henry Awards: "Greenleaf" (1957), "Everything That Rises Must Converge" (1963), and "Revelation" (1965). O'Connor also considered including "The Partridge Festival", but later withdrew it.

During her final illness, O'Connor wrote two new stories. "Judgment Day" is a dramatically reworked version of "The Geranium", which was one of O'Connor's earliest publications and appeared in her graduate thesis at the Iowa Writers' Workshop. "Parker's Back", the collection's only completely new story, was a last-minute addition.

The collection's eponymous story derives its name from the work of Pierre Teilhard de Chardin.

=== O'Connor's intended collection ===
It remains unclear whether O'Connor intended for "Parker's Back" and "Judgement Day" to be included in the Everything That Rises Must Converge collection. According to Forrest Ingram, editor Robert Fitzgerald told him that O'Connor's initial intent was to publish the first seven stories as a unit, and that he added the new stories after she died. Publisher Robert Giroux explained that O'Connor mostly left him in the dark about the new stories, and did not leave him instructions on whether to include them in the upcoming collection. She sent him the manuscript for "Judgement Day" in July 1964, and died on August 3 of that year.

Ingram argues that while the additional two stories both incorporate O'Connor's traditional Christian themes, and "Parker's Back" reflects the influence of Teilhard de Chardin on O'Connor's spirituality, the original seven stories work as a coherent unit and were meant to be read as such. He argues that the first seven stories are unified by their interest in "man's relationship to his neighbor, and therefore to himself and to God", which inevitably "entails a conflict of visions [where] [o]ne's self-image is shattered when one looks at himself through other eyes". He adds that "Revelation" ties together the six stories that came before it.

== In popular culture ==
In the fifth season Lost episode, "The Incident", Jacob reads Everything That Rises Must Converge while waiting for John Locke to fall from a window.

The band Shriekback put out a song by this title in 1985.

The Danish dark rock band Sort Sol ("Black Sun" in Danish) released an album called "Everything that rises... must converge!" in 1987. The album was initially intended to be called The Violent Bear It Away.

The music duo The Handsome Family released a song by this title in 1995.

A song by Moby is named “Everything That Rises.”

A quest title in Honkai Star Rail released in version 2.2

The band A Hope for Home put out a song by this title in 2011.

The band Elephant Tree (band) included the title in the lyrics for their song 'Bird'

In the Æon Flux episode "Chronophasia", a character speaks the title of the story.

Sufjan Stevens has a track on his 2023 album Javelin called "Everything That Rises" and he sings "Everything That Rises Must Converge."

The inter-dimensional indie synthpop duo Battery Operated Orchestra have a track with this title on their 2023 album "Compulsory Games"

In Tim Winton's novel 'Juice', the protagonist quotes "Everything that rises must converge" in a conversation with his mother about the ancient sagas of their world.
