= Latham Gaines =

American actor (born 1964)

- Born: February 3, 1964 (age 62); Birmingham, Alabama, U.S.

Latham Gaines (born February 3, 1964) is an American composer, inventor, performance coach, and actor. He is the son of the novelist Charles Gaines and artist Patricia Ellisor Gaines.

== Composing and Musical Sculptures ==
As 1/2 of the duo GAINES, Gaines and brother Shelby Gaines create sound sculpture from 'found' materials. Their pieces have been featured in several NY Art Shows and their live performance of their original score in Ethan Hawke’s revival of Sam Shepard’s A Lie of the Mind earned them a Drama Desk Award nomination in 2010. They collaborated with Hawke again in 2013, creating the sound doors that provided the soundtrack for "Clive" - Jonathan Marc Sherman's latter-day variation on Brecht's "Baal".

Most recently, Latham and his brother built new instruments from found objects and used them to create the original score for the 2026 film The Weight directed by Padraic McKinley. They used a similar process to score the Ethan Hawke directed film Wildcat, and The Kid directed by Vincent D'Onofrio.

== Inventing ==
In 2008, Gaines and his partner, Laura Interval, established "Opi and Me, LLC", a product development company specializing in licensing toys and game concepts to companies worldwide. They have had dozens of products produced and on the shelves including Mattel's SpinShotz, Canal's Power Dough, and Schmidt Spiele's Ligretto Twist.

== Acting career ==
Gaines moved to New Zealand in 1995. Some memorable roles include Mesogog / Dr. Anton Mercer in Power Rangers Dino Thunder and Bill Burke in Bridge To Terabithia. Gaines also starred in the TVNZ series The Cult, earning a nomination for "Best Performance by an Actor" at the Qantas Film and Television Awards for his portrayal of "Edward North".

== Filmography ==
Year	Title	Role	Notes
2004	Power Rangers Dino Thunder	Mesogog / Dr. Anton Mercer	TV series, 38 episodes
2005	The World's Fastest Indian	Passport Officer	
2005	King Kong	Photographer #1	
2007	Bridge To Terabithia	Bill Burke	
2008	Law & Order: Special Victims Unit	Mr. Crawford	TV series, 1 episode
2009	The Cult	Edward North	TV series, 13 episodes
2019	The Kid	Original Music Composer	
2023	Wildcat	Original Music Composer	
2025	Heart Eyes	Nico	
