= Parker's Back =

Short story by Flannery O'Connor

- Short story by Flannery O'Connor
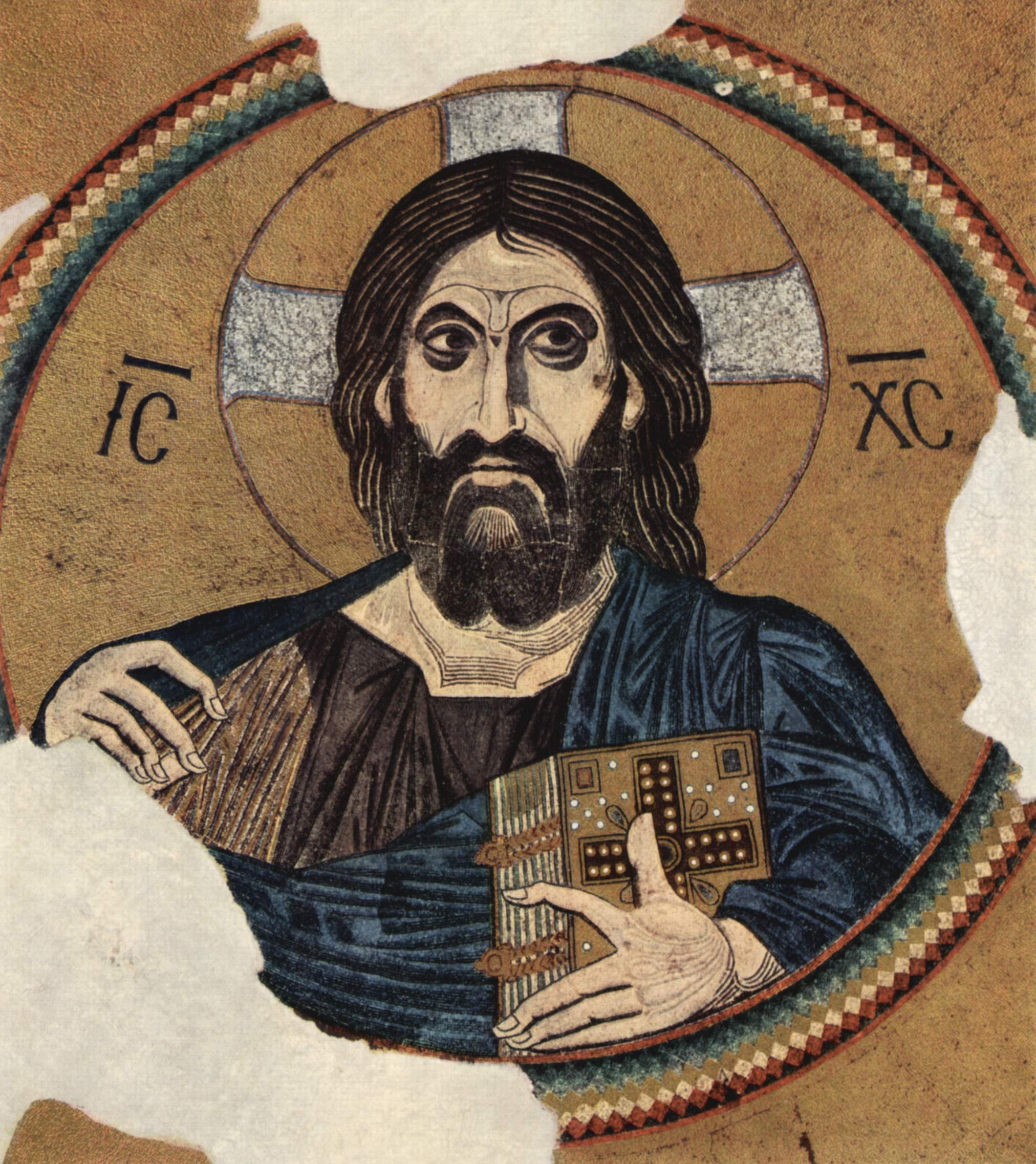
- A Byzantine Christ Pantocrator with expressive eyes — Church of Dormition in Daphni, Greece.
- Country: United States
- Language: English
- Genre: Southern Gothic

Publication
- Published in: Everything That Rises Must Converge
- Publication type: Single author anthology
- Publisher: Farrar Straus Giroux
- Media type: Print (hardcover)
- Publication date: 1965

"Parker's Back" is a short story by Flannery O'Connor. It was initially published in 1965 in O'Connor's posthumous short story collection Everything That Rises Must Converge. It tells the story of Parker, a worldly and disordered man who rejects Christianity and aimlessly drifts through life until supernatural phenomena begin appearing to him one day. Parker remains in denial about his growing spirituality until the end of the story, when he finally accepts his Christian nature. Ironically, it is his fundamentalist Christian wife who has the most trouble accepting the change.

André Bleikasten, a scholar of Southern American literature, said "'Parker's Back' belongs with O'Connor's most explicitly religious stories" and is "one of her most enigmatic and gripping texts".

== Publication history ==
"Parker's Back" first appeared in Flannery O'Connor's short story collection Everything That Rises Must Converge published in January 1965 after her death on August 3, 1964. The author worked closely with publisher Robert Giroux to complete the collection before she died.

The story was also published in Esquire with illustrations by Frank Bozzo in April 1965, and in O'Connor's short story collection The Complete Stories in 1971 that won the National Book Award for Fiction in 1972.

== Plot summary ==
Obadiah Elihue "O. E." Parker is an aimless young man. Rejecting his family's Methodist upbringing, he resents his Old Testament name and reacts violently when people use it. However, he struggles with a lack of direction, and has consistently failed to hold down a job. He is unhappily married to Sarah Ruth Cates, the daughter of a fundamentalist Christian pastor, who is pregnant. Parker's worldliness clashes with his wife's moral censoriousness. Sarah Ruth refuses to smoke, drink, curse, or wear makeup, and hates anything she considers idolatrous, including churches. Parker sleeps around with other women, but feels unable to leave Sarah Ruth.

Parker is particularly upset by his wife's lack of interest in his tattoos. Since he was a teenager, Parker has used tattoos as an emotional crutch. Nearly all of his body is tattooed except his back. The tattoos helped him cultivate a bad-boy image, which attracted some girls, but not Sarah Ruth, who considers the tattoos sinful. (Note: Her exact words are "vanity of vanities", from Ecclesiastes 1.) He wonders why he married her in the first place; the story implies that he chased her precisely because she was not interested in him. To make Sarah Ruth jealous, Parker lies to her that his boss is a young blonde woman.

One day, Parker has a mini-breakdown at work and begins sensing religious phenomena. He crashes into a tree while absentmindedly driving his boss' tractor; the resulting fire resembles Moses' burning bush. Instead of alerting his boss or going home, Parker drives to his favorite tattoo parlor, fifty miles away, where he plans to spend all his remaining cash on a back tattoo of Christ Pantocrator. He tells himself that Sarah Ruth "would not be able to resist" a religious tattoo, but in reality, he is guided by a kind of spiritual impulse. When he sees the tattoo in a mirror, he is shocked and moved by the gaze of God. The tattooist mockingly asks him whether he has gotten religion. Parker says no, but does not believe his own words. Later, he gets into a fight with old friends in town after they tease him for the same reason.

Dispirited, Parker drives home, where Sarah Ruth refuses to see him until he acknowledges his full name. Upon uttering the name "Obadiah", he experiences a spiritual awakening, "turning his spider web soul into a perfect arabesque of colors". (Note: Earlier in the story, O'Connor describes Parker's formative childhood memory of a heavily tattooed man in the same way: as an "arabesque". Parker reflects that this moment was also a kind of spiritual grace.) Sarah Ruth lectures him about how she met Parker's boss and now knows he lied to her. Parker shows her the tattoo, but she is appalled, as she believes visual depictions of God are idolatrous. It turns out that while Parker may have embraced Christianity, Sarah Ruth refuses to accept any form of Christianity that is not her own. She attacks him with a broom, and he flees the house, crying.

== Symbolism ==
=== Obadiah Elihue ===
Obadiah Elihue is the protagonist's Christian name, a name that "stank" to him as a boy, and is the identity he accepts at the end of the story.

- "Obadiah" in Hebrew means "servant or slave to God". In Judaism, Obadiah is one of the Twelve Minor Prophets in the final section of Nevi'im, the second main division of the Tanakh. In Christianity, the Book of Obadiah is classified as a minor prophet of the Old Testament, and in first Book of Kings chapter 18, he acts as a protector of prophets. As O. E., Parker's generosity for providing homesteaders fruit at no cost is a small step towards the likeness of the prophet, who generously expended all of his wealth feeding poor prophets.
- Elihue is the father of Elkanah, the father of the Old Testament character Samuel.
- Biblically, both Obadiah and Elihue share the quality of "commonness", and the untattooed boy O. E. is characterized in "Parker's Back" "as ordinary as a loaf of bread".

=== The Byzantine Christ tattoo and the Parkers' pecan tree ===
The Byzantine Christ tattoo Parker has on his back is that of a Christ Pantocrator. The Pantocrator is a glorified icon among the Eastern Catholic and Orthodox Churches. For the protagonist, the image has "eyes to be obeyed", representing his commitment to fulfill the meaning of his given name as a "servant or slave of God". As elaborated by Bleikasten: "[The eyes] betoken the final dis-owning, the final ex-propriation of his body, the ultimate dispossession of his self through absolute surrender to [God's] Law. ...Obadiah Elihu Parker is ready, at long last, to become one of God's prophets and martyrs." Since Parker's wife rejects images of Jesus as idolatry and regards Jesus as only a spirit and not the Savior of mankind, Parker suffers from the rejection of his gift to her and rejection of his new identity. Parker with the battered image of Christ on his back, suffers by his pecan tree as Jesus suffered, as the tree is a representation of the cross upon which Jesus was crucified.
