= Everything That Rises Must Converge (short story) =

Short story by Flannery O'Connor

- Short story by Flannery O'Connor
- Country: United States
- Language: English
- Genre: Realism

Publication
- Published in: New World Writing
- Publication type: Literary journal
- Media type: Print (magazine)
- Publication date: 1961

"Everything That Rises Must Converge" is a short story by Flannery O'Connor. It was originally published in New World Writing in 1961, and republished in 1965 as the namesake story of O'Connor's second and final short story collection. The story won O'Connor her second O. Henry Award in 1963 for the year's best American short story. In the story, an arrogant and depressed young man stews over his mother's antiquated views about race and fixation on her family's financial decline.

"Everything That Rises Must Converge" lacks the fantastical elements of O'Connor's usual Southern Gothic style, and is one of her only works about the American Civil Rights Movement. The story illustrates O'Connor's concern about the decline of Southern etiquette among both white and black Southerners, and the potential consequences of that decline for race relations in the American South. O'Connor was a Roman Catholic, and the title of the story references an epigram by Catholic Jesuit philosopher Pierre Teilhard de Chardin, who believed that people from all backgrounds would rise in Christian virtue, and in doing so grow more similar to each other.

== Development, title, and publication history ==
Flannery O'Connor rarely wrote fiction about the Civil Rights Movement, and "Everything That Rises Must Converge" may be the lone exception. The plotline about the integration of the local bus system was inspired by the Montgomery bus boycott of 1955–56. O'Connor's personal correspondence reveals that she did follow the movement's progress. For example, she predicted that the State of Georgia would not be able to shut down the University of Georgia and Georgia Tech to prevent their integration because "people will realize that this means no more collegiate football". She preferred the approach John F. Kennedy took during his early years as President, which was later characterized as cautious towards reform.

The title "Everything That Rises Must Converge" refers to a work by the French philosopher Pierre Teilhard de Chardin titled the "Omega Point": "Remain true to yourself, but move ever upward toward greater consciousness and greater love! At the summit you will find yourselves united with all those who, from every direction, have made the same ascent. For everything that rises must converge." O'Connor may have learned about Teilhard de Chardin from her publisher, Robert Giroux, who had gifted her an anthology of his work several years earlier.

The story was first published in the October 1961 issue of New World Writing. It was reprinted in the posthumously published collection Everything that Rises Must Converge (1965).

== Plot summary ==
Julian lives with his mother in an unnamed Southern city. He resents his mother, who has not gotten over the loss of her parents' luxurious plantation lifestyle following the abolition of slavery. Julian's mother wants her son to restore the family's financial standing, but Julian is an underemployed college graduate and lacks hope for the future. His mother periodically needles him about how much she has sacrificed to set him up for success. She clings to her upper-class version of Southern manners, dressing formally (though not fashionably) and scolding Julian for not wearing a tie in public. Julian is stung by his mother's criticism, and his internal narration reveals a martyr complex, tinged with arrogance and self-righteousness.

The mother's doctor asks her to attend exercise classes at the local YMCA. The mother is reluctant, as she does not want to ride the bus, which has recently been integrated. To feel safer, she guilt-trips Julian into riding the bus with her. Julian resents the intrusion and the cause, but goes along. On the bus, Julian and his mother argue about whether culture is in the mind (Julian's view) or the heart (the mother's view). The mother argues that "how you do things" reflects "who you are."

Julian decides that he can gain the moral high ground by focusing on his mother's open racism. He wants to make a show of being nice to a high-status black person in front of his mother, but he is blind to his own prejudices and finds it hard to find a black person who satisfies his criteria for respectability. He tries to start a conversation with a well-dressed black passenger, but the man politely keeps his distance. When a black woman and her young son ("Carver") get on the bus, he refuses to move to sit next to his mother, which forces Carver's mother to sit next to him and Carver to sit next to Julian's mother. Julian is initially pleased because his mother is visibly upset that her son is sitting with a black adult, but he is soon dismayed to see his mother being nice to Carver. (Julian's mother approves of certain kinds of black people that she can treat maternalistically, such as children and domestic servants.)

Julian, his mother, and the two black passengers all get off at the same stop. Julian's mother decides to give Carver some pocket change, in her usual condescending but well-meaning manner. Julian is horrified, and Carver's mother is infuriated by what she sees as a personal insult. Carver's mother punches Julian's mother, which appears to trigger a heart attack. Not seeing the symptoms, Julian berates his mother for her outmoded racial views, proclaiming that "the old manners are obsolete and your graciousness is not worth a damn." He does not realize his mother is in danger until she starts hallucinating and calling out for her old black nurse Caroline. As Julian frantically calls for a doctor, the story remarks that he is about to enter "the world of guilt and sorrow."

== Analysis ==
O'Connor was concerned about how blacks and whites could live together in a post-segregation world. In a 1963 interview with C. Ross Mullins for Jubilee magazine, a Catholic periodical, O'Connor said that "it requires considerable grace for two races to live together, particularly when the population is divided about 50–50 between them and when they have our particular history. It can't be done without a code of manners based on mutual consent. ... For the rest of the country, the race problem is settled when the Negro has his rights, but for the Southerner, whether he's white or colored, that's only the beginning." She concluded that in the modern South, the "old manners are obsolete, but the new manners will have to be based on what was best in the old ones - in their real basis of charity and necessity."

O'Connor argued that formality was not the exclusive preserve of the old Southern aristocracy, saying that "[f]ormality preserves that individual privacy which everyone needs and, in these times, is always in danger of losing." She emphasized that black Southerners understood the importance of formal manners, saying that the black man was "not the clown he's made out to be," but "a man of very elaborate manners and great formality, which he uses superbly for his own protection and to insure his own privacy."
