= Robert Giroux =

American book editor and publisher

- Born: April 8, 1914; Jersey City, New Jersey, U.S.
- Died: September 5, 2008 (aged 94); Tinton Falls, New Jersey, U.S.
- Education: Columbia University (BA)
- Occupation: Chairman Farrar, Straus and Giroux
- Spouse: Carmen de Arango (1952–1969) (divorced)

Robert Giroux (April 8, 1914 – September 5, 2008) was an American book editor and publisher. Starting his editing career with Harcourt, Brace & Co., he was hired away to work for Roger W. Straus, Jr. at Farrar & Straus in 1955, where he became a partner and, eventually, its chairman. The firm was henceforth known as Farrar, Straus and Giroux, where he was known by his nickname, "Bob".

In his career stretching over five decades, he edited some of the most significant writers of the 20th century, including T.S. Eliot, George Orwell, Virginia Woolf, Thomas Merton, and published the first books of Jack Kerouac, Flannery O'Connor, Jean Stafford, Bernard Malamud, William Gaddis, Susan Sontag, Larry Woiwode and Randall Jarrell and edited seven Nobel laureates: Eliot, Isaac Bashevis Singer, Derek Walcott, Nadine Gordimer, Seamus Heaney, William Golding and Alexander Solzhenitsyn. In a 1980 profile in the New York Times Book Review, poet Donald Hall wrote, "He is the only living editor whose name is bracketed with that of Maxwell Perkins," the editor of F. Scott Fitzgerald and Ernest Hemingway.

== Early life and education ==
The youngest of five children, Giroux was born in Jersey City, New Jersey, to Arthur J. Giroux, a foreman for a silk manufacturer, and Katharine Lyons Giroux, a grade-school teacher. Robert Giroux was one of five children: Arnold, Lester, Estele, Josephine and Robert, and grew up in the old Irish-Catholic West Side of Jersey City. His sisters Josephine and Estelle both left high school to work and contribute money so that Bob could continue his education. He had three nieces, Maclovia, Kathleen and Roberta, whom he was close to throughout his life.

He attended Regis High School in Manhattan, but dropped out during the Depression, to take a job with local newspaper, the Jersey Journal. (He eventually received his diploma 57 years later, in 1988.) Giroux received a scholarship to attend Columbia College of Columbia University, intending to study journalism. Soon, though, he found himself drawn to literature. His main classroom mentors were the poet and critic Mark Van Doren and Raymond Weaver, the first biographer of Herman Melville, who had discovered the novella, Billy Budd in manuscript form in 1924. "Imagine discovering a masterpiece..., as he later noted, "a great book is often ahead of its time, and the trick is how to keep it afloat until the times catch up with it". At Columbia, too, Giroux met a number of contemporaries who were destined for greatness in arts and letters, among them his classmate John Berryman, Herman Wouk, Thomas Merton, Ad Reinhardt, and John Latouche. In addition to writing film reviews for The Nation, Giroux became president of the Philolexian Society and editor of the literary magazine The Columbia Review, where he published some of Berryman's and Merton's earliest works. Upon graduating in 1936, he declined Van Doren's offer of a Kellett Fellowship at Cambridge University; the fellowship went to Berryman instead.

== Career ==
Giroux started his career with a job with the Columbia Broadcasting System (CBS) in public relations. After working there for four years, he found his first editing job as a junior editor, at Harcourt, Brace & Company in 1940. Among the first works he edited was Edmund Wilson's work on 19th-century socialist thinkers, To the Finland Station (1940), which was to become a classic.

During World War II, Giroux enlisted in the US Navy in 1942 and served aboard the USS Essex in air combat intelligence as an intelligence officer until 1945, rising to the rank of lieutenant commander.

After leaving the navy, he took his article about the rescue of a fighter pilot downed at the Battle of Truk Lagoon in the Pacific to a Navy public information Office in New York, where the officer in charge, Lt. Roger W. Straus Jr., suggested that he could get him $1,000 by selling it to a mass publication. "Rescue at Truk" ran in Collier's and was later widely anthologized. He published an article about the "Capture at Truk" which made the cover of Life magazine.

In 1948, Giroux rejoined Harcourt, where he became executive editor and worked under the supervision of Frank Morley, a former director of Faber & Faber. He published many novels rejected by other publishing houses, such as Bernard Malamud's The Natural (1952), Kerouac's The Town and the City (1950) and O'Connor's Wise Blood (1952). He also worked on Thomas Merton's autobiography, The Seven Storey Mountain (1948). Soon he became adept at finding new authors, and one of his first finds was the novelist and short-story writer Jean Stafford, who in turn introduced him to her husband, Robert Lowell, who was trying to find a publisher for his second book of poems. Impressed by Lowell's manuscript, Giroux published the collection Lord Weary's Castle immediately, and it went on to win the 1947 Pulitzer Prize for Poetry. In a PBS documentary on Lowell, Giroux states that it was the most successful book of poems that he ever published.

In 1947, Frank Morley left the company and returned to London, and a year later, Giroux was promoted to editor-in-chief, reporting to Eugene Reynal, an Ivy League scholar whom Brace had brought in to replace Morley. This development did not turn out amicably for the two. In a 2000 interview with George Plimpton in The Paris Review, he called Reynal tactless and a "terrible snob".

From 1948 to 1955, Giroux continued to edit important works. By 1951, his reputation as America's foremost editor had attracted foreign writers. For example, in 1951, he published Hannah Arendt's first book in English, The Origins of Totalitarianism. Of his seven Nobel prize winners, who included Alexander Solzhenitsyn, Isaac Bashevis Singer, Derek Walcott, William Golding, Seamus Heaney, and Nadine Gordimer, the only one born in the United States was T.S. Eliot.

After Alfred Harcourt and Donald Brace died, Giroux decided to move. In the same Plimpton interview, he revealed how as a young editor at Harcourt, Brace & Co., he won the opportunity to publish The Catcher in the Rye, the 1951 novel by J. D. Salinger, but lost it after the textbook department noted "Not for us", rejecting the manuscript. He soon started looking around and in 1955 he joined Farrar, Straus & Company, run by his fellow Second World War veterans John C. Farrar and Roger Straus, as editor-in-chief. Almost twenty of his writers at Harcourt eventually followed him, including Eliot, Lowell, O'Connor, and Malamud. In 1959, Malamud's The Magic Barrel became FSG's first National Book Award winner. Farrar, Straus & Company made him a partner in 1964, giving the company its new name, Farrar, Straus and Giroux (FSG). Robert Lowell's book of poems, For the Union Dead (1964) was the first book to bear his imprint. He became company's chairman in 1973.

Among the writers Giroux discovered or developed at FSG were Jack Kerouac, John Berryman, Jean Stafford, Bernard Malamud, Thomas Merton, Flannery O'Connor, Isaac Bashevis Singer, Carl Sandburg, Elizabeth Bishop, Katherine Anne Porter, Walker Percy, Donald Barthelme, Grace Paley, Derek Walcott and William Golding. By 2000, FSG books had won 29 literary awards, as well as a dozen Pulitzer Prizes and 20 Nobel Prizes.

Giroux worked with Kerouac on his first novel, The Town and the City, and on the manuscript for his Beat classic On the Road. The former was dedicated to him. In a documentary interview, Giroux recalled how he tried to explain to Kerouac that the novel, typed out on a huge, single roll of paper, needed to be worked on, to which Kerouac replied: "There shall be no editing of this manuscript, this manuscript was dictated by the Holy Ghost."

Among the notable works he published as an editor were a collection of Berryman's critical prose as The Freedom of the Poet (1976), Collected Prose of Robert Lowell (1987), and Collected Prose of Elizabeth Bishop (1984), whose letters he later edited, as One Art (1994). He also authored The Education of an Editor, The Book Known as Q: A Consideration of Shakespeare's Sonnets (1982), and A Deed of Death (1990), an investigation of the 1922 murder of the Hollywood director William Desmond Taylor.

His relationship with Straus was often strained. Giroux, more the literary man, was often at odds with Straus, who was primarily a businessman. Farrar, Straus & Giroux never published his 25th-anniversary anthology, which he also edited, as Straus took offense to his portrayal in Giroux's introduction. Giroux did not complete his memoirs because he said he did not want to write negatively about Straus. For his part, Straus counted Giroux's joining his company as the significant event in its history.

Once Giroux suggested to Eliot that editors were mostly failed writers, to which Eliot replied: "so are most writers".

From 1975 to 1982, he was president of the National Board of Review of Motion Pictures, an organization that fights movie censorship.

== Awards and honors ==
Giroux received an honorary doctorate from Seton Hall University in 1999, from Saint Peter's College/University in 2001, the Mayoral Award of Honor for Art and Culture from the City of New York in 1989, and the Elmer Holmes Bobst Award in Arts and Letters from New York University in 1988.

He also received the Alexander Hamilton Medal, the Columbia College Alumni Association's highest honor, in 1987, the same year he received the Ivan Sandrof Lifetime Achievement Award at the National Book Critics Circle Award. He was awarded a Special Citation at the National Board of Review Awards 1989. In 2006, he was presented with the Philolexian Award for Distinguished Literary Achievement.

== Marriage ==
In 1952, Giroux married Doña Carmen Natica de Arango y del Valle (common name: Carmen de Arango) (died 1999), an advisor to the Holy See Missions Delegation to the United Nations they divorced in 1969. Doña Carmen de Arango was the younger daughter of Cuban aristocrat Don Francisco de Arango, 3rd Marquis de la Gratitud, and his wife, the former Doña Petronilla del Valle, and she had been previously engaged to Thomas O'Conor Sloane III and Don Julio Lafitte, Count de Lugar Nuevo. After the death of her sister, Doña Mercedes, the 4th Marquise in 1998, Doña Carmen de Arango Giroux became the 5th Marquise de la Gratitud.

== Death ==
Giroux died on September 5, 2008, at Seabrook Village, an independent-living center, in Tinton Falls, New Jersey, aged 94. At his memorial at Columbia University's St. Paul's Chapel, Paul Elie, another editor said, "It is tempting to float an analogy between his death and the death of a certain kind of publishing. But the fact is that his kind of publishing was rare in his own time, and so was he."
