= Flannery O'Connor bibliography =

The bibliography of Flannery O'Connor includes two novels, more than thirty short stories, and several collections.

== Novels ==
- Wise Blood (1952)
- The Violent Bear It Away (1960)

== Collections ==
- A Good Man Is Hard to Find and Other Stories (1955)
- Three (1962)
- Everything That Rises Must Converge (1965)
- The Complete Stories (1971)
- Flannery O'Connor: Collected Works (1988)
- Flannery O'Connor: The Cartoons (2012)

== Short stories ==
- "The Geranium" (1946)
- "The Barber" (1948)
- "The Turkey", "The Capture" (1948)
- "The Train" (1948)
- "The Peeler" (1949)
- "The Heart of the Park" (1949)
- "A Stroke of Good Fortune", "A Woman on the Stairs" (1949)
- "Enoch and the Gorilla" (1952)
- "A Good Man Is Hard to Find" (1953)
- "A Late Encounter with the Enemy" (1953)
- "The Life You Save May Be Your Own" (1953)
- "The River" (1953)
- "A Circle in the Fire" (1954). First published in Volume XVI No. 2 of the Spring, 1954 issue of The Kenyon Review.
- "The Displaced Person" (1954)
- "A Temple of the Holy Ghost" (1954)
- "The Artificial Nigger" (1955)
- "Good Country People" (1955)
- "You Can't Be Any Poorer Than Dead" (1955)
- "Greenleaf" (1956)
- "A View of the Woods" (1957)
- "The Enduring Chill" (1958)
- "The Comforts of Home" (1960)
- "Everything That Rises Must Converge" (1961)
- "The Partridge Festival" (1961)
- "The Lame Shall Enter First" (1962)
- "Why Do the Heathen Rage?" (1963)
- "Revelation" (1964)
- "Parker's Back" (1965)
- "Judgement Day" (1965)
- "Wildcat" (1970)
- "The Crop" (1971)
- "An Afternoon in the Woods" (1988)

== Non-fiction, letters, interviews ==
- Mystery and Manners: Occasional Prose (1969)
- The Habit of Being: Letters of Flannery O'Connor (1979)
- The Presence of Grace: and Other Book Reviews (1983)
- The Correspondence of Flannery O'Connor and the Brainard Cheneys (1986)
- Conversations with Flannery O'Connor (1989)
- The Manuscripts of Flannery O'Connor at Georgia College (1989)
- A Prayer Journal (2013)
- Good Things out of Nazareth: The Uncollected Letters of Flannery O'Connor and Friends (2019)
