= The Complete Stories (O'Connor) =

1971 short story collection by Flannery O'Connor

- First edition cover
- Author: Flannery O'Connor
- Language: English
- Genre: Southern Gothic
- Publisher: Farrar, Straus and Giroux
- Publication date: November 8, 1971
- Publication place: United States
- Media type: Print
- Pages: 556
- ISBN: 0-374-12752-2
- OCLC: 239478
- Dewey Decimal: 813/.5/4
- LC Class: PZ4.O183 Co PS3565.C57

The Complete Stories is a collection of short stories by Flannery O'Connor. It was published in 1971 by Farrar, Straus and Giroux. It comprises all the stories in A Good Man Is Hard to Find and Everything That Rises Must Converge plus several previously unavailable stories.

Complete Stories won the 1972 U.S. National Book Award for Fiction. Internet visitors named it the "Best of the National Book Awards" as part of the Fiction Award's 60th anniversary celebration in 2009, voting on a ballot of the best six award winners selected by writers associated with the Foundation.

== Contents ==
- "The Geranium"
- "The Barber"
- "Wildcat"
- "The Crop"
- "The Turkey"
- "The Train"
- "The Peeler"
- "The Heart of the Park"
- "A Stroke of Good Fortune"
- "Enoch and the Gorilla"
- "A Good Man Is Hard to Find"
- "A Late Encounter with the Enemy"
- "The Life You Save May Be Your Own"
- "The River"
- "A Circle in the Fire"
- "The Displaced Person"
- "A Temple of the Holy Ghost"
- "The Artificial Nigger"
- "Good Country People"
- "You Can't Be Any Poorer Than Dead" (later adapted into the novel The Violent Bear It Away)
- "Greenleaf"
- "A View of the Woods"
- "The Enduring Chill"
- "The Comforts of Home"
- "Everything That Rises Must Converge"
- "The Partridge Festival"
- "The Lame Shall Enter First"
- "Why Do the Heathen Rage?" (later published in book form as Why Do the Heathen Rage?)
- "Revelation"
- "Parker's Back"
- "Judgment Day"
