= A Good Man Is Hard to Find =

A Good Man Is Hard To Find may refer to:

- "A Good Man Is Hard to Find" (short story), a 1953 short story by Flannery O'Connor
- A Good Man Is Hard to Find and Other Stories, a 1955 collection of short stories by Flannery O'Connor
- "A Good Man Is Hard to Find" (song), a 1917 song by Eddie Green performed by Marion Harris
- "A Good Man Is Hard to Find (Pittsburgh)", a 1982 song by Bruce Springsteen from the 1998 album Tracks
- "A Good Man Is Hard to Find", a song by Sufjan Stevens from the 2004 album Seven Swans
