= The Lame Shall Enter First =

Short story by Flannery O'Connor

- Short story by Flannery O'Connor
- Country: United States
- Language: English
- Genre: Southern Gothic

Publication
- Published in: The Sewanee Review
- Publication type: Periodical
- Media type: Print (magazine)
- Publication date: Summer 1962

"The Lame Shall Enter First" is a novella by Flannery O'Connor. It was originally published in The Sewanee Review (Summer 1962) and republished in 1965 in O'Connor's posthumous short story collection Everything That Rises Must Converge. It tells the story of an atheist social worker who decides that a juvenile delinquent's intelligence makes him worthier of his compassion than his own son, until the delinquent's Christianity becomes too conspicuous for him to ignore. The social worker believes that he can fix the delinquent's attitude by fixing his physical deformity, but the delinquent's problems are primarily spiritual in nature. The story is the longest short story O'Connor published during her lifetime.

== Plot summary ==
=== Part One ===
Following his wife's untimely death, local bureaucrat Sheppard raises his ten-year-old son Norton on his own. The two grieve in different ways. Sheppard, who thinks of himself as a good person, asserts that the best way to move on is to help others, and volunteers at the local reformatory. However, Norton engages in stress eating, which Sheppard sees as a sign of selfishness. In addition, Norton is not doing well at school. Sheppard scolds his son for continuing to grieve, but the story hints that he is still grieving himself and refuses to admit it.

Sheppard feels that his talents are "wasted on Norton", and focuses on helping boys he deems worthier. He grows particularly interested in Rufus Johnson, a fourteen-year-old juvenile delinquent with an IQ of 140. An atheist, Sheppard believes his training in social work makes him better at counseling children than a priest. He attributes Johnson's failures to his mental hangups over his clubfoot, underprivileged upbringing, and troubled life at home.

Over Norton's objections, Sheppard invites Johnson to live with him. He hopes that if he fosters Johnson's intellectual curiosity, Johnson will stop committing crimes. However, Johnson uses his intelligence in mischievous ways: he manipulates Sheppard by playing up his difficult upbringing, but behind Sheppard's back, he insults his host and mocks Norton's mother. He also racially abuses Sheppard's African-American cook. Norton tells his father about Johnson's misdeeds, but instead of disciplining Johnson, Sheppard criticizes his son for tattling. Even Johnson is appalled by Sheppard's self-righteousness.

=== Part Two ===
To reform Johnson, Sheppard buys him a telescope, a microscope, new clothes, and an orthopedic shoe for his clubfoot. He whips Norton when the boy complains. He maintains his unflagging faith in Johnson until the two clash over religion. Johnson is a self-hating fire-and-brimstone Christian who acknowledges his misdeeds and believes he will go to hell for them. He promises himself that he will reform one day and become a preacher, but Sheppard does not help him find proper spiritual guidance.

Norton proves to be the tipping point, as his late mother was a Christian, a fact Sheppard tries to hide from him. Sheppard tells Norton that his mother will not have an afterlife, while Johnson assures Norton that she is in heaven. In response, Norton asks Johnson to teach him about Christianity. When Norton asks Johnson whether he will go to heaven, the older boy gloomily responds that while Norton is currently bound for heaven, "if you live long enough, you'll go to hell." Norton's growing spirituality also ignites a kind of intellectual curiosity, as he uses Johnson's telescope to look for his mother in the stars.

Disappointed by Johnson's religiosity, Sheppard refuses to provide an alibi when Johnson is arrested for breaking and entering. The crime is later attributed to an African-American, and Johnson is released. Feeling guilty, Sheppard protects Johnson when the police try to arrest him a second time. It is implied that Norton knows Johnson committed the crime, but is scared to tell his father about it. After a third confrontation with the police, Johnson admits to Sheppard that he committed all the crimes he was accused of. Sheppard says that he will save him, but Johnson responds that only Jesus can save him. The next day, inspired by the Book of Ezekiel, (Note: Ezekiel 3:3.) Johnson eats a page of the Bible in front of Sheppard.

One night, Norton claims he has found his mother in the stars. Sheppard tries to dissuade him, but is distracted when Johnson gets himself arrested again. Sheppard tells Johnson that he is mentally compensating for his clubfoot, but Johnson expresses pride in his foot, saying that "the lame shall enter first". The boy defiantly insists that "I lie and steal because I'm good at it". As the police take Johnson away, Sheppard realizes that he has neglected his son "to feed his vision of himself". He rushes home, but Norton has already hanged himself.

== Analysis ==
Discussing "The Lame Shall Enter First", Thomas Merton (another prominent Catholic writer of the period) wrote that in O'Connor's fiction, "the good people are bad and the bad people tend to be less bad than they seem", and while O'Connor's "crazy people ... turn out to be governed by a strange kind of sanity", "the sane ones [] are incurable lunatics".

Commentators have compared the story to O'Connor's novel The Violent Bear It Away, due to its similar characters and Christian theme (that "[t]here is no salvation in works, whatever form they may take, or in self").

The story also serves as a companion to "The Comforts of Home", which was also published in Everything That Rises Must Converge. In both stories, a parent alienates their child through their compassionate attempts to save a juvenile delinquent from falling out of society. However, in "The Comforts of Home", the parent is heroically motivated by her Christian religion, while in "The Lame Shall Enter First", the parent is dubiously motivated by his own self-righteousness. O'Connor wrote that while "the old lady ... brings [her son] face to face with his own evil", Sheppard "thought he was good and thought he was doing good when he wasn't". However, several commentators have argued that both stories illustrate cases of parents with "impurely good intentions". One of those commentators recognizes that O'Connor might disagree with that interpretation.

== In popular culture ==
Although the phrase "the lame shall enter first" sounds like a Bible verse, it does not actually appear in the Bible.

A proposed loose sequel to the films The Guard (2011) and Calvary (2014) would have been titled The Lame Shall Enter First, after the novella. However, as of 2016, director John Michael McDonagh said that the project was "on the back burner".
