= Betty Hester =

American correspondent (1923–1998)

- Born: June 1, 1923; Rome, Georgia, U.S.
- Died: December 26, 1998 (aged 75); Atlanta, Georgia, U.S.
- Occupation: American correspondent

Hazel Elizabeth Hester (June 1, 1923 – December 26, 1998) was an American correspondent of influential twentieth-century writers, including Flannery O'Connor and Iris Murdoch. Hester wrote several short stories, poems, diaries, and philosophical essays, none of which were published.

== Life ==
Hester was born in Rome, Georgia, and attended Young Harris College. She lived and worked in Atlanta before joining the U.S. Air Force in 1948. After five years in the service she had risen to the rank of technical sergeant and was stationed in Wiesbaden, Germany, after World War II (c. 1948–53). She was discharged as "undesirable" for being a lesbian. After her discharge from the Air Force, she returned to Georgia. Hester spent most of her life in a small Midtown Atlanta apartment. She worked for an Atlanta-based retail credit company (Equifax), commuting every day by bus. She struggled with alcoholism and bouts of depression but kept her sexual orientation a secret except to her closest friends.

Hester is best known for her nine-year correspondence and friendship with Southern fiction writer Flannery O'Connor. From 1955 to 1964, Hester and O'Connor exchanged nearly 300 letters, some of which are published in Sally Fitzgerald's 1979 compilation of O'Connor's correspondence, The Habit of Being. Hester, a very private and reclusive woman, asked that her identity be kept secret in the published letters; thus, she appears as "A".

Hester first wrote to O'Connor in July 1955, when O'Connor was working on her second novel, The Violent Bear it Away. Eager to exchange thoughts and ideas with someone of equal intellectual caliber, O'Connor wrote back: "I would like to know who this is who understands my stories." O'Connor felt that she and Hester shared a spiritual kinship, and O'Connor would later become Hester's confirmation sponsor in the Catholic Church. Hester left the Church in 1961 and turned to agnosticism. This news was a grave disappointment for O'Connor, who had engaged Hester in theological dialogues and tried to sustain her friend's faith.

== Death and legacy ==
Hester gave her letters to Emory University in 1987 on the condition that they be sealed for twenty years. They were released to the public on May 12, 2007.

Like her mother, Hester died of a self-inflicted gunshot wound on December 26, 1998, in Atlanta, at the age of 75.

== Notes ==
=== Works cited ===
- O'Connor, Flannery (1979). Fitzgerald, Sally (ed.). The Habit of Being: Letters of Flannery O'Connor. Farrar, Straus and Giroux. ISBN 9780374521042.
