= Why Do the Heathen Rage? =

Why Do the Heathen Rage? may refer to:

- Why Do the Heathen Rage? (album), 2014, by The Soft Pink Truth
- Why Do the Heathen Rage? (novel), an incomplete novel by Flannery O'Connor
- "Why Do the Heathen Rage?" (short story), 1963, by Flannery O'Connor
- Psalm 2, in the KJV Bible.
