= The Train (short story) =

Short story by Flannery O'Connor

- Short story by Flannery O'Connor
- Country: United States
- Language: English
- Genre: Southern Gothic

Publication
- Published in: The Sewanee Review
- Publication type: Journal
- Media type: Print (magazine)
- Publication date: Spring 1948

"The Train" is an early short story by the American author Flannery O'Connor. It is one of the six stories included in O'Connor's 1947 master's thesis The Geranium: A Collection of Short Stories and was published in the Spring 1948 issue of The Sewanee Review. It later appeared in the 1971 collection The Complete Stories. O'Connor revised this story into the first chapter of her 1952 novel Wise Blood.

"The Train" describes a young man, Hazel Wickers, as he boards a train home and his interactions with other passengers and an African American employee who he believes to be the son of someone in his hometown. The man denies this.
