= The Life You Save May Be Your Own =

Short story by Flannery O'Connor

- Short story by Flannery O'Connor
- Country: United States
- Language: English
- Genre: Southern Gothic

Publication
- Published in: The Kenyon Review
- Publication type: Literary journal
- Media type: Print (magazine)
- Publication date: Spring 1953

"The Life You Save May Be Your Own" is a short story by American author Flannery O'Connor. It was first published in the Spring 1953 issue of The Kenyon Review, and is featured in her 1955 collection A Good Man Is Hard to Find. It tells the story of a woman who tries to con a self-absorbed drifter into marrying her daughter, only to be conned by the drifter in return. It was the only O'Connor story to receive a film or television adaptation during her lifetime, in 1957.

== Plot summary ==
Lucynell Crater and her daughter Lucynell live on a struggling farm. The story gradually reveals that the daughter is severely disabled: she is intellectually disabled, (Note: The disability is only implied in the story, but O'Connor confirmed it in an essay.) she cannot hear or speak, and her vision is impaired.

One day, Tom Shiftlet, a traveling carpenter and mechanic, visits the Crater farm. Mrs. Crater offers him food and lodging in exchange for house and car repairs. Although she does not think highly of him, she is looking to add manpower for the farm. She encourages Mr. Shiftlet to marry her daughter and live with her on the farm, sweetening the deal by lying to him about Lucynell's capabilities and age. For his own part, Mr. Shiftlet frequently makes broad philosophical pronouncements of questionable validity or sincerity.

Over the following week, Mr. Shiftlet fixes large parts of the farm and surprises Mrs. Crater by teaching young Lucynell to say her first word, "bird." Mr. Shiftlet agrees to marry her after Mrs. Crater promises him $17.50 for a honeymoon trip (approximately $210 in 2025 dollars), but shows no affection.

During the honeymoon, Mr. Shiftlet and Lucynell stop at a diner. While Lucynell is napping, Mr. Shiftlet drives away without her. He lies to the staff that she was a hitchhiker. Before he leaves, the counter boy tells Mr. Shiftlet that Lucynell looks like an angel of God.

Mr. Shiftlet continues driving to Mobile, Alabama. He passes by a billboard warning "Drive carefully. The life you save may be your own." He picks up an actual hitchhiker, a young boy. Sensing that the boy is running away from home, he tearfully tells him that he regrets deserting his own mother, whom he compares to an angel of God. The boy angrily denounces Mr. Shiftlet's mother and his own before jumping from the moving car. Mr. Shiftlet notices ominous clouds behind him and prays for them to wash the world clean. The clouds pour rain on the rear of his car as he continues down the road.

== Themes ==
As in several other O'Connor stories, such as "A Good Man Is Hard to Find" and "Good Country People," in "The Life You Save May Be Your Own" a malevolent stranger intrudes upon the lives of a family with destructive consequences. Tom Shiftlet has been compared to The Misfit in "A Good Man is Hard to Find"; however, Shiftlet remains primarily a comic character and does not embody The Misfit's spiritual dimensions.

== Adaptation ==
In 1957, the story was adapted into The Life You Save, a television production on the Schlitz Playhouse of Stars, starring Gene Kelly. To O'Connor's great disappointment, the teleplay altered the ending by having Mr. Shiftlet (renamed "Triplet") return to Lucynell. O'Connor wrote that her feelings about the change were "not suitable for public utterance". She did not allow a film or television adaptation of her fiction for the rest of her life.
