= The Barber (short story) =

Short story by Flannery O'Connor

- Short story by Flannery O'Connor
- Country: United States
- Language: English
- Genre: Southern Gothic

Publication
- Published in: New Signatures
- Publication type: Book
- Publisher: James A. Decker
- Publication date: 1948

"The Barber" is an early short story by the American author Flannery O'Connor. It is one of the six stories included in O'Connor's 1947 master's thesis The Geranium: A Collection of Short Stories and was first published in New Signatures I: A Selection of College Writing in 1948. It later appeared in the 1971 collection The Complete Stories. The story involves a professor who feels a need to explain his liberal political views to a conservative barbershop.

== Critical reception ==
Tim Lieder notes that a story about a man trying to argue racists out of their racism lands differently after 8 years of Obama. "A story about a guy who thinks that he can argue with racists and argue racists out of their racism or at least into a slightly less racist stance is not going to land the same as it might in a better era." Warren Emerson declares that this story is O'Connor at her best in terms of irony. " Throughout the story, it’s the college professor (and not the Barber and his companions) that plays the fool. He finds himself arguing with an audience that won’t listen. He is corrected by his audience who seem to understand the economic stakes he has up for grabs with the election better than he does."
