= The Crop (short story) =

Short story by Flannery O'Connor

- Short story by Flannery O'Connor
- Country: United States
- Language: English
- Genre: Southern Gothic

Publication
- Published in: Mademoiselle
- Publication type: Magazine
- Publication date: April 1971

"The Crop" is an early short story by the American author Flannery O'Connor. It is one of the six stories included in O'Connor's 1947 master's thesis The Geranium: A Collection of Short Stories and was published posthumously in Mademoiselle in 1971. It also appeared in the 1971 collection The Complete Stories.

In the story, the main character, Miss Willerton, is trying to write a book. She comes up with an idea about a man who is attacked by his wife with a knife, but then Willerton inserts herself into the story to save the man. Miss Willerton is then interrupted to go to the grocery store where she is disgusted by the people there. Upon returning home, she decides to change the topic of her work to something about the Irish.
