= Good Country People =

Short story by Flannery O'Connor

- Short story by Flannery O'Connor
- Country: United States
- Language: English
- Genre: Southern Gothic

Publication
- Published in: Harper's Bazaar
- Publication type: Magazine
- Media type: Print
- Publication date: June 1955

"Good Country People" is a short story by Flannery O'Connor. It was first published in the June 1955 issue of Harper's Bazaar, and is included in her 1955 short story collection A Good Man Is Hard to Find. In the story, an educated Southern atheist resents her affluent mother's overbearing manner and patronizingly dismisses a traveling Bible salesman as a "good country person". When she goes on a date with the salesman, her worldview is quickly upended. The story is often considered one of O'Connor's best works.

== Plot summary ==
Mrs. Hopewell owns a farm in rural Tennessee with the assistance of her tenants, Mr. and Mrs. Freeman. She finds Mrs. Freeman annoying, but patronizingly thinks of the Freemans as "good country people".

Mrs. Hopewell's daughter, Joy, is thirty-two years old, unmarried, overweight, and disabled, having lost her leg in a childhood shooting accident. She has a doctorate in philosophy and would prefer to leave town and teach at a university, but a debilitating heart condition forces her to live with her mother, whom she deeply resents. To annoy her mother, Joy changes her name to "Hulga", treats her mother's houseguests rudely, and makes unnecessary noises around the house. Mrs. Hopewell's efforts to steer Hulga in a more conventional direction only make Hulga dislike her more.

One day, traveling salesman Manley Pointer tries to sell Mrs. Hopewell a Bible. Although she is not interested—she is not particularly devout, and Hulga is an atheist—Pointer flatters her while deprecating himself as a simple country fellow. When he mentions that he too has a heart condition, Mrs. Hopewell invites him to stay for dinner. He accepts and tells them about a difficult life that led him to missionary work. On his way out, he speaks with Hulga by the road and asks her for a date to which she agrees. That night she imagines seducing Pointer and using his remorse over the sinful encounter to teach him the naïveté of his worldview.

On the date Pointer begins to seduce Hulga and leads her up to the loft of a barn with his bible case in tow. Amused by his childish demeanor, she starts to return his affections but is taken aback when he urges her to remove her artificial leg. After she reluctantly does so, Pointer sets it aside and opens his case to reveal a few bibles alongside whiskey, condoms and obscene playing cards. Realizing that Pointer has deceived her all along, she demands her leg back. He tosses the leg into his case, mocks her arrogance and strands her on the loft.

Mrs. Hopewell and Mrs. Freeman recognize Pointer as he heads for the road and remark how wonderfully simple he is.

== Themes ==
In "Good Country People," O'Connor uses irony and a finely controlled comic sense to reveal the modern world as it is—without vision or knowledge. As in O'Connor's story "A Good Man Is Hard to Find," a stranger—deceptively polite but ultimately evil—intrudes upon a family with destructive consequences.

In Joy's case, despite her advanced academic degrees, she is unable to see what is bad, and her mother's stereotyping perspective proves to be equally misleading and false. O'Connor wrote that Joy's wooden leg was a metonym for her spiritual deficiencies: "She believes in nothing but her own belief in nothing, and we perceive that there is a wooden part of her soul that corresponds to her wooden leg." However, she also cautioned that the leg needed to operate both as a symbol and as a literal physical disability.

=== Ugliness ===
Monica Carol Miller, writing for Middle Georgia State University, stated that Joy represents a class of characters in southern literature that use ugliness as a way to avoid traditional southern expectations for women to marry and become primarily homemakers, in contrast to the idea of the southern belle. Miller also states that the southern concept of ugliness extends to both appearance and behavior, and refers to the theme of ugliness in this literature as the "ugly plot". This "ugly plot" often includes a conflict between mothers attempting to make their daughters eligible for the traditional roles and expectations, causing the daughters to rebel further. According to Miller, this is reflected in "Good Country People" by dinner-table suggestions made by Mrs. Hopewell about smiling that lead to Joy storming off while referencing philosophy. Noting that Joy's appearance and behavior are intentional, she suggests that this intentionality is what angers Mrs. Hopewell about Joy's behavior. Miller also suggests that Joy uses ugliness as a way to choose intellectualism rather than more traditional southern domestic life. She also sees social class as playing a role in Joy's behavior. Because the Hopewells are higher-status landowners, Joy is able to pursue intellectualism rather than domesticism, while two lower-class female characters in the story (the Freeman sisters) are portrayed as having no options other than marriage. Miller writes "ugliness as a choice [...] points to the material requirements of being able to imagine alternatives to expectations of gender".

=== Suffering ===
Davis J. Leigh, writing for Renascence, notes that O'Connor's writings reflect her Roman Catholic faith. One of her influences was theologian Romano Guardini, who stated "what Christ suffered, God suffered". Leigh describes O'Connor's philosophy on the matter as suffering being "a shared experience with Christ". O'Connor herself spent the last 13 years of her life suffering from the effects of lupus. Leigh equates Joy's removal of her wooden leg for the Bible salesman as showing a willingness to share her sufferings with the salesman, who then uses her trust of him to state that she had faith in something. Leigh also describes the salesman as a suffering character, trapped in a secular mind. His rejection of Joy is a mockery of her suffering and a rejection of his own. Seeking a philosophical freedom, Joy was only partially transformed through suffering, while the salesman found no transformation.

=== Disability ===
Sara Hosey, in an article for Teaching American Literature, examined "Good Country People" from a perspective of disability. Hosey notes that when talking to the salesman, Joy states that she is 17, rather than her true age of 32, reflected her pretending to be a young woman, which has traditionally been viewed as dependent. The salesman also coerces her into the barn loft by suggesting she was unable to climb the ladder, leading to climbing to demonstrate her normalcy. After the salesman takes her glasses and false leg, Joy is then dependent due to her disability. By attempting to demonstrate her normalcy and independence, Joy is rendered dependent and her disability is emphasized.

=== Religious elements ===
Hosey also compares Joy's intelligence to a spiritual prosthetic, serving as a replacement for the lack of religiosity in her life. When the salesman tells her that "she ain't so smart", her philosophical basis is destroyed. In the book Mystery and Manners, O'Connor herself stated that Joy was "spiritually as well as physically crippled".

== See also ==
- Flannery O'Connor bibliography

== Sources ==
- Hosey, Sara (2013). "Resisting the S(crip)t: Disability Studies Perspectives in the Undergraduate Classroom". Teaching American Literature. 6 (1): 23–44. ISSN 2150-3974.
- Leigh, Davis J. (Fall 2013). "Suffering and the Sacred in Flannery O'Connor's Short Stories". Renascence. 65 (5): 365–380. ISSN 0034-4346.
- Miller, Monica Carol (2015). ""I'm No Swan": The Ugly Plot from "Good Country People" to Eating the Cheshire Cat". Mississippi Quarterly. 68 (3/4): 437–454. ISSN 0026-637X.
