= The Turkey =

Short story by Flannery O'Connor

- Short story by Flannery O'Connor
- Country: United States
- Language: English
- Genre: Southern Gothic

Publication
- Published in: Mademoiselle
- Publication type: Magazine
- Publication date: November 1948

"The Turkey" is an early short story by the American author Flannery O'Connor. It is one of the six stories included in O'Connor's 1947 master's thesis The Geranium: A Collection of Short Stories and was published in Mademoiselle in 1948 as "The Capture." It later appeared in the 1971 collection The Complete Stories and a modified version appeared in her Complete Works in 1988 as An Afternoon in the Woods.

The story involves a boy chasing and capturing an injured turkey, which is taken from him before he can bring it back to his family. The story has a Christian theme and deals with the boy's sinful motivations.
