= Wildcat (short story) =

Short story by Flannery O'Connor

- Short story by Flannery O'Connor
- Country: United States
- Language: English
- Genre: Southern Gothic

Publication
- Published in: North American Review
- Publication type: Journal
- Publication date: Spring 1970

"Wildcat" is an early short story by the American author Flannery O'Connor. It is one of the six stories included in O'Connor's 1947 master's thesis The Geranium: A Collection of Short Stories and was published posthumously in The North American Review in 1970. It later appeared in the 1971 collection The Complete Stories.

In this story, the main character "Old Gabriel," a blind, elderly African American man, is afraid of a wildcat, which he can supposedly smell. He remembers a story from his childhood of a wildcat killing someone he knew, and does not want to be left alone for fear that it will attack him. The story portrays Gabriel's struggles with his impending death. Stephen Stam calls it a "terse piece, one rich with authentic dialect that rings true to a time when the educational gap between rich and poor, black and white, created a linguistic gulf."
