= A Stroke of Good Fortune =

Short story by Flannery O'Connor

- Short story by Flannery O'Connor
- Country: United States
- Language: English
- Genre: Southern Gothic

Publication
- Published in: Tomorrow
- Publication type: Literary magazine
- Media type: Print
- Publication date: August 1949

"A Stroke of Good Fortune", originally published as "A Woman on the Stairs", is a short story by the American author Flannery O'Connor about a woman who dislikes children and is in denial that she is pregnant.

== Publication history ==
The story first appeared with the title "A Woman on the Stairs" published in the August 1949 issue of the American Tomorrow magazine. The work was permanently retitled as "A Stroke of Good Fortune" where it appeared in Spring 1953 issue of Shenandoah magazine, and was published as the fourth story in the author's short story collection A Good Man Is Hard to Find and Other Stories that first appeared in 1955.

== Plot summary ==
The story begins as Ruby Hill, a woman who has lately been suffering from minor illness, enters the door of her apartment building after shopping at the grocery store. Ruby begins to work her way up the stairs to her apartment, stopping frequently to catch her breath. Along the way she reflects on aspects of her life, including her younger brother Rufus, who has recently returned from fighting in the European Theater and is now living with Ruby and her husband. She thinks disparagingly about her brother, and his failure to change much from their rural upbringing. She also thinks about her husband, Bill Hill, a salesman for "Miracle Products" who has seemed particularly happy lately; about her age of 34; and about her general dislike for children. When she sits down on a step to catch her breath she accidentally sits on a toy pistol, which she recognizes as belonging to Hartley Gilfeet, an unruly six-year-old boy who lives in the building. She also thinks about Madam Zoleeda, a fortune teller who has recently read her palm and claimed that "a long illness" would lead to "a stroke of good fortune."

On the second floor Ruby is accosted by Mr. Jerger, a 78-year-old former teacher who asks her if she knows whose birthday it is. When she does not, he drags her into his apartment and shows her a book about Ponce de Leon and tells her about his search for the legendary Fountain of Youth. When she excuses herself from Mr. Jerger, and continues up the stairs, she becomes out of breath after only five steps and wonders for an instant if she has cancer. By the time she reaches the apartment of her friend Laverne Watts on the third floor she is nauseated and disoriented. After Ruby enters her friend's apartment and collapses into a chair, Laverne begins to tease her about being pregnant, and asks after her brother Rufus. Ruby does not like Laverne's interest in her brother, and denies the possibility that she is pregnant, claiming that her husband would never "slip up". Finally, however, Ruby begins to admit to herself the possibility that she is pregnant. Suddenly, she is startled by a loud noise coming from below, and when she peers down the banister she sees Mr. Jerger fighting and yelling with Hartley Gilfeet. As she stares down the stairwell, she says the words "Good Fortune, Baby" and feels a little roll in her stomach.

== Background ==
O'Connor conceived the story during the early stages of working on her first novel, Wise Blood. The character of Ruby's younger brother Rufus later grew into Wise Blood's Hazel Motes, and Ruby's neighbor, Laverne Watts, was an early rendition of Wise Blood's Leora Watts. The story was first published as "The Woman on the Stairs" in the August 1949 issue of Tomorrow, and was later published as "A Stroke of Good Fortune" in the spring 1953 issue of Shenandoah. By 1955 O'Connor had revised it so as to include it in the short story collection A Good Man is Hard to Find.

== Criticism ==
John McDermott notes that "A Stroke of Good Fortune" has been "dismissed by most critics as one of the least effective of Flannery O'Connor's short stories." O'Connor herself found it too farcical to support the serious moral implications of Ruby's behavior.

Whitt and McDermott agree that Ruby is in denial about being pregnant, and that everyone else in the story knows. Whitt points out that at the beginning of the story Ruby has brought home four cans of beans from the grocery store, as a way to explain away the kicks of the baby as simply gas pains. On the other hand, Bill Hill's new look of contentment, Mr. Jerger's coy look when he tells Ruby to ask Bill whose birthday it is, and Laverne's open teasing all point to the fact that everyone else in the building knows.

Whitt called the story "a collection of obvious life signs placed in a context of death images". She points to phallic symbols like the pistol Ruby sits on, and the fact that Hartley Gilfeet is from Rodman. She also points out references to menstruation. The flights of stairs in Ruby's apartment, for example, each contain 28 steps. Ruby, in contrast, is described as a funeral urn.
