= An Afternoon in the Woods =

- Short story by Flannery O'Connor
- Country: United States
- Language: English
- Genre: Southern Gothic

Publication
- Published in: Collected Works (1988)
- Publication type: single author anthology
- Publication date: 1988 (posthumous)

"An Afternoon in the Woods" is a short story by Flannery O'Connor. It was published posthumously in 1988 in her Collected Works. It is the final version of The Turkey and "The Capture" and was originally part of her 1947 master thesis. It was going to be published in 1955 compilation, but was replaced with "Good Country People." A devout Roman Catholic, O'Connor often used religious themes in her work.

== Plot summary ==
In the story a 10-year-old boy, Manley, sneaks into the woods from a birthday party. During this sojourn he has fun humorously blaspheming by himself and reflects on his older brother who is always getting into trouble but kills a bobcat, partially redeeming himself. Manley ends up spotting a wild turkey which he chases through the woods and eventually finds it dead, suffering from a wound. The boy thinks he will be a hero when he brings the large turkey home and proves himself to his family. He marches it the long way through town so everyone can see him carrying it. Feeling bad about his blaspheming and other sins, Manley prays that he sees a homeless person to give his dime to, and he sees Hetty Gilman who takes his dime but looks dissatisfied. He sees this as testing God. People in the town notice Manley, including some boys who follow him. When he puts down the turkey to show it to the boys, they steal it and run off. Manley runs home feeling as though something terrible is chasing him.
