= The Heart of the Park =

Short story by Flannery O'Connor

- Short story by Flannery O'Connor
- Country: United States
- Language: English

Publication
- Published in: Partisan Review
- Publication type: Periodical
- Media type: Print (magazine)
- Publication date: February 1949

"The Heart of the Park" is a short story written by Flannery O'Connor.

== Background ==
"The Heart of the Park" was originally published in the February 1949 issue of Partisan Review. It was not collected in either of O'Connor's collections of short stories published during her lifetime, but was included in The Complete Stories after her death by her longtime editor, Robert Giraux. The story was not originally collected because she later adapted it and other stories into her first novel, Wise Blood; "The Heart of the Park" was partially edited into its own chapter. Wise Blood was published in May 1952.

== Summary ==
Enoch Emery is a gate guard at a park, who is waiting for the second-shift guard to arrive at work so he can leave. Every day when he finishes working, Enoch goes into the park and hides in some bushes, watching people swim at the public pool. He particularly likes to watch women swim and sunbathe. On this day, he thinks about something that he has hidden in the middle of the park, which nobody has seen yet except him. He believes that he has "wise blood" that tells him what he is supposed to do by beating against his heart. The park is a special place, he thinks, because the park is in the center of the city and his secret is in the heart of the park. He sees a gray car driving around outside the pool, but his attention is diverted by a woman he watches frequently at the pool, who comes with her two small sons. She is also noticed by another man, who Enoch sneaks behind. The woman pulls down her bathing suit straps, as if to signify that she knows the men are watching her, but otherwise shows no recognition. The other man watching the woman recognizes Enoch, and Enoch realizes the other man, Hazel Weaver, is the person he is supposed to share his secret with. However, Hazel, who is possibly involved in criminal activities, needs Enoch to give him the address of someone Enoch knows, who are involved in his scheme. Enoch uses Hazel's need of him to convince him to come see his secret with him, but Enoch cannot visit the secret without going through his usual ritual, which involves getting a milkshake at a diner called The Frosty Bottle, walking past all the animals in a small zoo, and finally walking through the museum.

When the men get to The Frosty Bottle, they encounter Maude, a woman Enoch likes to flirt with who he believes is in love with him. However, Maude screams at Enoch that he is a "son of a bitch", and tells Hazel that he shouldn't be friends with Enoch, because Hazel is "clean." Hazel replies that he "isn't clean", and the men leave The Frosty Bottle. Next, they go to the small zoo full of animals. Enoch is trying to hurry because he wants to get to the secret before Hazel abandons him, but Hazel stops at a cage. The cage appears to be empty, but really contains a small owl on a branch, which mesmerizes Hazel. They get to the museum finally, and sneak into the back room because the museum guard dislikes Enoch. When they get to the back of the museum, they find Enoch's secret: a mummified, shrunken man who was tortured and killed by Arabs. As they stand looking at the man in the case, the woman from the pool with two little boys enters the museum. She approaches Enoch and Hazel, smiles at them, and whistles to alert the authorities. Hazel runs out and Enoch chases after him. Hazel grabs Enoch and shakes him to try to make him reveal the address of the people he needs to see, but Enoch says nothing and Hazel pushes him away. Enoch hits his head against a tree and lays there, when he sees a figure in blue pick up a rock and throw it at him. He feels no pain, and smiles as though he has fulfilled his purpose for the day. As he lies bleeding from his head injury, Hazel escapes.

== Characters ==
- Enoch Emery – a man who works as a first-shift gate guard at a park, who likes to enter the park when he is done working, watch the swimmers, drink milkshakes, visit zoo animals, and visit the museum. He is not very smart, and believes he has "wise blood", like his daddy.
- Hazel Weaver – a man who comes to the park looking for Enoch, he is in trouble with the law but it is unclear why. He tries to convince Enoch to tell him the address of "some people" who gave him a peeler, possibly in connection with his criminal activities.
- Maude – a large woman with a man's bobbed haircut, and a "once-white uniform covered with brown stains", Maude works in The Frosty Bottle, a diner shaped like a large Orange Crush bottle, and claims to possess an acute ability to sense good people and bad people. She is frustrated with Enoch flirting with her when he comes in every day on his way to visit the museum.
- The Woman – a woman who visits the swimming pool every few days with her two little boys, Enoch likes to watch her from inside the bushes while she swims. Hazel and Enoch are both watching her the day they visit the museum, where she appears and grins at the men, then whistles for the authorities.

== Interpretation ==
One of the most commonly cited threads of O'Connor stories is grotesque, and seemingly needless, violence. Enoch's injury at the end of the story seems to not fit with the rather mundane nature of the rest of the story. This violence is meant to be disconcerting, and shows the random nature of chance, and how wrong Enoch was about having "wise blood", and thinking that something important to him would happen that day. He was correct about the importance of the event, but was incorrect about the positivity of the event. Another important aspect is the idea of isolation in Flannery O'Connor's fiction. The main character is often isolated from everyone else around him or her, and such is the case with Enoch Emery. His isolation is important to the story because it is through his strangeness that we see the world in a strange way; we could not view the horrible things Enoch sees through the eyes of a normal person. There are also some religious undertones that go along with the violence in the story. Enoch, the (relatively) innocent party, sacrifices himself so that the guilty person, Hazel, can go free. Since Flannery O'Connor tends to have a Christ-figure in her stories, Enoch could be the figure of Jesus in the story, being crucified and Barabbas, the thief, going free. Flannery O'Connor herself was a devout Catholic and often included such symbolism in her stories.

== Critical reception ==
The story is not typically considered to be one of O'Connor's most important works. It is instead judged for its similarities and differences respecting the edited version that became a chapter of Wise Blood. It is considered by many to be an undeveloped narrative, drawn from characters from other stories, and may have been unfinished before it was edited.
