= Why Do the Heathen Rage? (novel) =

Unfinished novel by Flannery O'Connor

- First Edition cover 2024
- Author: Flannery O'Connor
- Language: English
- Publication date: 2024

Why Do the Heathen Rage? is an incomplete novel by the American author Flannery O'Connor, who published a small fragment of the draft in Esquire in 1963, shortly before her death. O'Connor's notes and drafts were edited into a narrative by Jessica Hooten Wilson and published in 2024 by Brazos Press under the title, Flannery O'Connor's Why Do the Heathen Rage? A Behind-the-Scenes Look at a Work in Progress.

== Background ==
A year before O'Connor's death, a fragment first appeared as "Why Do the Heathens Rage?" in the July 1963 edition of Esquire, which was devoted to writers' works-in-progress. Above the fragment was the editorial note, "Flannery O'Connor's first two novels were Wise Blood and The Violent Bear It Away--her third novel is as yet untitled, and she says it may be years before it's finished. This excerpt is from the beginning section."

O'Connor initially conceived of the story as a continuation of her 1958 short story "The Enduring Chill", and several elements of the earlier story carried over into the published version of "Why Do the Heathens Rage?", including a Southern mother and her two squabbling children, one a domineering female schoolteacher, the other a downbeat male intellectual.

O'Connor was still drafting the Why Do the Heathen Rage? novel when she died in 1964. She left behind 378 typed and hand-edited pages of the unfinished manuscript, which were subsequently acquired by Georgia College and State University in 1970. The 1963 Esquire fragment was subsequently republished in The Complete Stories (1971) and in her Library of America Collected Works (1988).

In 2024, Jessica Hooten Wilson (Pepperdine University) collected O'Connor's drafts of the novel and edited them into a narrative, which was published as Flannery O'Connor's Why Do the Heathen Rage? A Behind-the-Scenes Look at a Work in Progress. She wrote that since O'Connor left no outline or indication of how the action of the novel would unfold, she made certain "editorial choices" about how to present the episodes to a reader.

== 1963 short story fragment ==
The Tilman family welcomes home its patriarch, Mr. Tilman, who is recovering from a stroke. Mr. and Mrs. Tilman are both angry people. They have two adult children: schoolteacher Mary Maud (age 30) and intellectual Walter (age 28). Mary Maud is a domineering leader, while Walter frustrates his mother with his downbeat and lackadaisical manner. When Mr. Tilman arrives, the only person he acknowledges is his black manservant, Roosevelt.

Mrs. Tilman informs Walter that with Mr. Tilman incapacitated, Walter will have to take over the day-to-day running of the family estate. She threatens to evict him if he does not help, but Walter calls her bluff and gloomily suggests that his generation is not fit to run things. Mrs. Tilman reflects that Walter is more interested in corresponding with other people than practical pursuits.

Mrs. Tilman remembers Walter closely reading a letter from St. Jerome to his mentee St. Heliodorus of Altino. In the letter, Jerome angrily scolds Heliodorus for leaving the Holy Land and going back to Europe to take care of his parents, as he wants Heliodorus to embrace a religious vocation. Jerome warns Heliodorus that Jesus is coming to change the world and needs people to actively serve the Christian mission. A footnote explains that Heliodorus later became bishop of Altinum, in modern-day Italy. (Note: In the letter, Jerome also argues that Heliodorus cannot reach his full potential as a Christian minister at home, since "no prophet is accepted in his own country" (Luke 4:24) and he will have fewer distractions in a foreign land.)

== Novel characters and plot ==
The fragments revolve around Walter Tilman, a twenty-eight year-old man recovering from an unnamed illness who lives with his parents on a farm named Meadow Oaks. One of Walter's hobbies is writing letters to public figures. He has written to Oona Gibbs, an activist at a commune named Fellowship Farm, but has done so in the guise of a Black man in order to mock her aspirations and desire for social justice. Oona does not know that Walter has misrepresented himself in this way and writes back an enthusiastic letter about her life and aims as a reformer. Walter further leads her to believe he is a Black farmer by taking a number of photographs of the farm at Meadow Oaks and becomes convinced that she will come to visit him. However, after a period in which he feels guilty for his actions, Walter sends a telegram to Oona, insisting that she not come to Meadow Oakes. O'Connor lets the reader know what Walter does not: that Oona is already on her way.

Other fragments detail Oona's childhood and mother, Walter's father's stroke, Walter's baptism, and Walter noticing his estranged aunt at a lecture.

== Reception ==
Publishers Weekly noted, "Wilson does a great service in resurrecting one of O’Connor’s lesser-known works." Writing in the National Catholic Register, Kathy Schiffer praised Wilson's commentary, which "offers so much that the reader may not have known." In Our Sunday Visitor, Kenneth Craycraft argues that offering these fragments as an "unfinished novel" is misleading, but also calls it an "important book" and praises Wilson for her "service to O’Connor readers in providing us with this brief but penetrating study of an artist struggling to find a particular kind of voice."
