= The River (short story) =

Short story by Flannery O'Connor

- Short story by Flannery O'Connor
- Country: United States
- Language: English
- Genre: Southern Gothic

Publication
- Published in: The Sewanee Review
- Publication type: Literary journal
- Publisher: The University of the South
- Media type: Print (magazine)
- Publication date: Summer 1953

"The River" is a Southern Gothic short story by the American author Flannery O'Connor that was first published in 1953 about a very young boy who is taken by his babysitter to a preacher at a Christian healing where he is baptized in a river, and, the next day, runs away from home to the site of his baptism and baptizes himself, and then is taken by the river to find the Kingdom of Christ, as told by the preacher, and drowns.

== Publication history ==
"The River" first appeared in The Sewanee Review in the Summer 1953 issue, and republished in 1955 as the second story in the author's short story collection A Good Man Is Hard to Find and Other Stories. The work later appeared in numerous other short story collections.

== Plot summary ==
The story focuses on a boy named Harry Ashfield who is brought to a Christian revival meeting by his babysitter, Mrs. Connin, a revivalist Christian who believes in faith healing. Harry is about four or five years old and has a troubled home life. When he hears he is going to meet the young evangelist Bevel Summers, he tells Mrs. Connin that his name is Bevel. For the rest of the story, Harry is referenced as Bevel.

While at the revival, Bevel is baptized in the river by the evangelist who tells him he has a father in heaven who loves him, and that he is counted among the saved now—that he "counts." When the boy returns home, his family still ignores him despite the fact that he tells them that he now counts. In the morning, young Bevel returns to the river to re-experience the events of the preceding day and drowns while attempting to find the Kingdom of Christ.

When Bevel returns and jumps in to the river, a gas station owner named "Mr. Paradise" who sees Bevel wandering about, follows him to the river and dives in after him, but is unable to save him, emerging from the river 'empty-handed,' 'looking like some ancient water monster'. Mr. Paradise, who was afflicted with cancer behind the ear, was a regular participant at the river revivals, but only to act as a skeptic and show off his cancer which is never healed by the evangelist. Mr. Paradise uses Bevel's innocence to further mock the evangelist, who is humiliated publicly while praying seriously for Bevel's 'sick' mother when Bevel reveals with childlike innocence that her 'sickness' is actually a hangover. Mr. Paradise 'guffaws' at this embarrassing revelation, saying 'Haw! Cure the afflicted woman with the hangover!'

== Themes ==
Mr. Paradise is curiously named; 'paradise' is evocative both of the Garden of Eden and Heaven; While Bevel is promised Heaven and Salvation by the evangelist and the river, the river baptism doesn't cure Mr. Paradise's cancer or make him 'count' to his mother or his family, and the river in fact sweeps Bevel away to his death; the River promises a Paradise, while a man who is actually named 'Paradise', who has observed the river baptism with skepticism and mockery throughout the story, and might be said to represent a rationalist skepticism, is also powerless to save Bevel.

Does the man named Mr. Paradise represent some actual hope for paradise, as opposed to that offered by the Evangelist and Mrs. Connin? If so, clearly that hope is something beyond both the belief of the evangelist and Mrs. Connin, and the unbelief of Mr. Paradise, since neither are able to save Bevel.

While Bevel's drowning in the river that promised him baptism and eternal life, that promised him that he would 'count' for something, is a grotesquely humorous irony, typical of O'Connor's stories, it might be pointed out that Bevel does indeed experience an epiphany of sorts as he is swept away to his death; 'for an instant he was overcome with surprise; then, since he was moving quickly and knew that he was getting somewhere, all his fury and his fear left him.' Baptism in Christian theology has long been associated with death and detachment; in baptism we enter (according to St Paul) into the death of Christ, undergoing a 'dying to sin' and a 'dying to self.' It is perhaps this dying to self that Bevel is experiencing as 'his fury and fear leave him' and why 'he knew he was getting somewhere.'
