= The Peeler =

Short story by Flannery O'Connor

- Short story by Flannery O'Connor
- Country: United States
- Language: English
- Genre: Southern Gothic

Publication
- Published in: Partisan Review
- Publication type: Journal
- Publication date: December 1949

"The Peeler" is a short story by the American author Flannery O'Connor. It was first published in Partisan Review in 1949. It later appeared in the 1971 collection The Complete Stories. It was eventually incorporated into her novel, Wise Blood.

The story describes a young man, Hazel Motes, encountering a man selling potato peelers on the street who is interrupted by a blind man and his daughter who are handing out religious tracts. Motes also encounters Enoch Emery, a young man who seems to parallel himself, and they follow the blind man down the street.
