= A Good Man Is Hard to Find (short story) =

Short story by Flannery O'Connor

- Short story by Flannery O'Connor
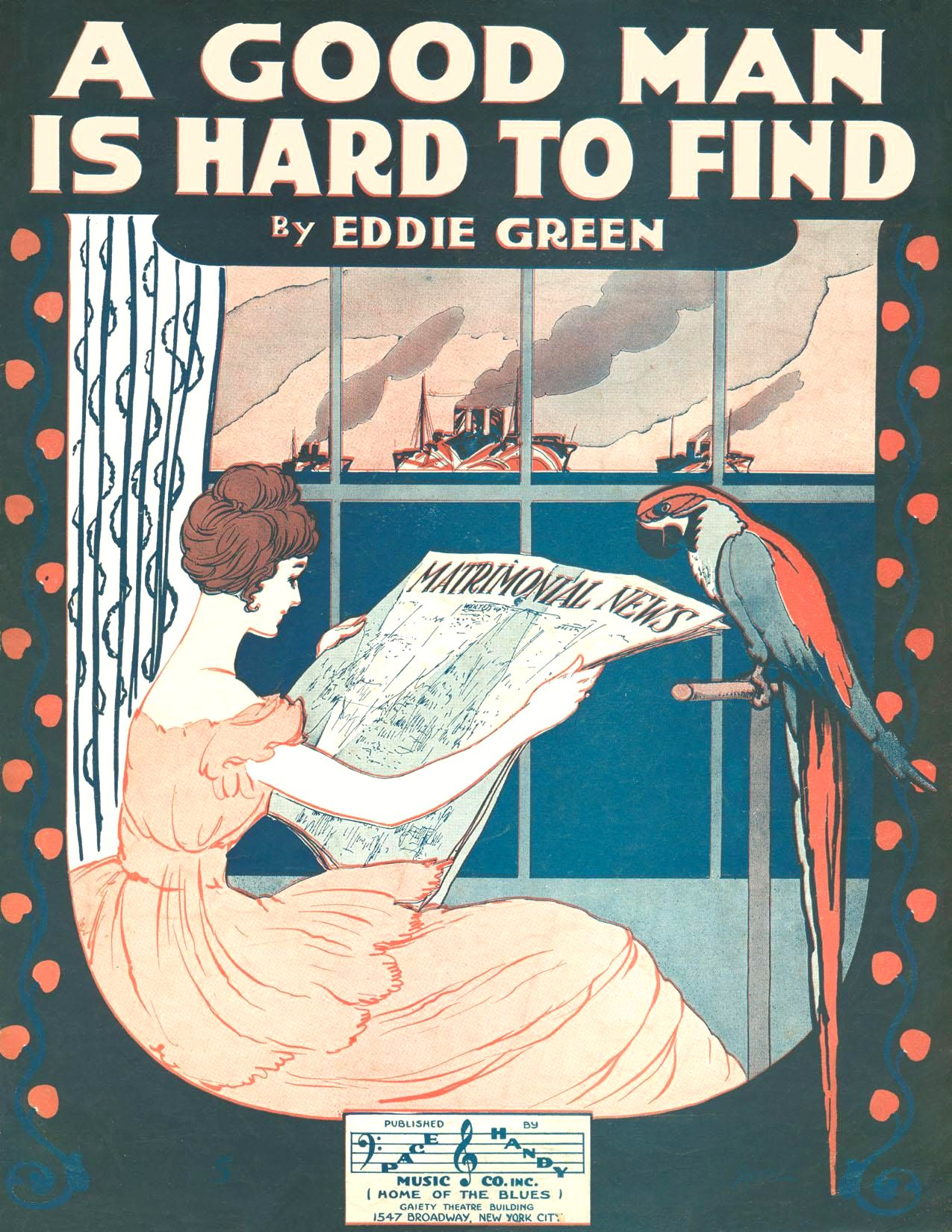
- The work's title was taken from the 1917 Eddie Green song that includes the lines "A good man is hard to find / You always get the other kind."
- Country: United States
- Language: English
- Genres: Southern Gothic, short story, dialogue

Publication
- Published in: Modern Writing I
- Publication type: Short story collection
- Publisher: Avon
- Media type: Print
- Publication date: 1953

"A Good Man Is Hard to Find" is a Southern gothic short story first published in 1953 by author Flannery O'Connor who, in her own words, described it as "the story of a family of six which, on its way driving to Florida [from Georgia], is slaughtered by an escaped convict who calls himself the Misfit".

The story remains the most anthologized of all of O'Connor's works.

== Publication history ==
"A Good Man Is Hard to Find" was first published in 1953 in the multi-author short-story anthology Modern Writing I published by Avon. The story appears in her own collection of short stories A Good Man Is Hard to Find and Other Stories published in 1955 by Harcourt. In 1960, it was included in the anthology The House of Fiction, published by Charles Scribner's Sons, and later included in numerous other short-story collections.

== Plot ==
Bailey, the head of an Atlanta household, prepares to take his family on a vacation to Florida. Bailey's mother (known only as "the grandmother" throughout the story) wants to go to East Tennessee to visit relatives instead, and warns Bailey that a convict called The Misfit has escaped from prison and is heading towards Florida. The family, including Bailey, her grandson John Wesley, her granddaughter June Star, and her infant grandchild, tended to by her daughter-in-law, ignore her. When they leave the next morning, the grandmother occupies the backseat of the family's car, dressed finely so that if she is killed in an accident, she can be recognized as a Southern lady. She hides the family's cat, Pitty Sing, in a basket between her legs, not wanting to leave it home alone.

While traveling, the grandmother points out scenery in Georgia. Her grandchildren respond by berating both Georgia and Tennessee, and the grandmother reminds them that in her day, children were more respectful. She delights in seeing a naked black child waving from a shack, finding the image quaint. She sees a graveyard which was once part of a cotton plantation that she jokingly says has "Gone with the Wind". She tells her grandchildren that when she was young she was courted by a man who, as an early owner of Coca-Cola stock, died wealthy.

The family stops for barbeque at the Tower Restaurant after passing a series of billboards proclaiming the restaurant and food as "famous" and the proprietor, Red Sammy Butts, as "the fat boy with the happy laugh". On arrival, the family finds that the place is somewhat run down. Red Sammy charms the grandmother but is rather scornful of his own wife, a mistrustful waitress who worries about being robbed by The Misfit. The grandmother promptly declares Red Sammy "a good man", and the two reminisce about better times while lamenting the decay of values.

Later that afternoon, the family continues their trip before the grandmother falsely remembers a plantation being in the area, only realizing her mistake after persuading Bailey to turn down a rocky dirt road surrounded by wilderness. Her embarrassment when she realizes her error causes her to disturb the cat, who leaps onto Bailey. He loses control of the car, and the automobile flips into a ditch. No one is seriously hurt but the accident is witnessed by a party of three strange men, one of whom the grandmother recognizes as The Misfit. She tells him she knows who he is, and The Misfit has his men lead Bailey, the children's mother, and the children off into the woods where they are shot. The grandmother confusedly pleads for her life, insisting she knows he is a good man. The Misfit, initially dismissive, grows more and more unsettled by her words. She beseeches him to find solace by praying, but The Misfit is uncertain if Jesus Christ's power was real and unclear about his own purpose.

Finally upon seeing The Misfit's despair, the grandmother reaches out, touches his shoulder, and gently tells him that he is "one of her babies". The Misfit immediately shoots her to death. When his companions return, The Misfit, while holding the surviving Pitty Sing, says the grandmother "would have been a good woman if it had been somebody there to shoot her every minute of her life." He seems to conclude that violence affords "no real pleasure in life".

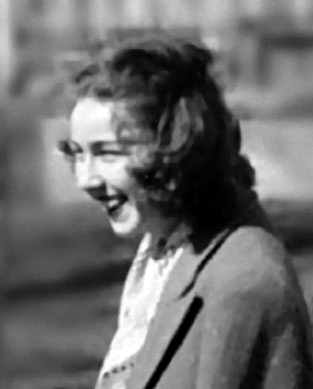
Flannery O'Connor

== Characters ==
- The grandmother: the protagonist of the story, a woman who lives with her son Bailey, her daughter-in-law and her grandchildren. She takes great pride in being "a lady". The narrator refers to her as "grandmother" when at least one grandchild is alive, "old lady" when her grandchildren are dead, and a "young lady" as she recalls a plantation home near her native Tennessee home. The central conflict of the story is between the grandmother and The Misfit, her killer, in a dialogue that occurs while Bailey, his wife and children are shot in the woods not far from the two characters.
- The Misfit: an escaped convict on the run with two other criminals. He is mentioned in the first paragraph of the story, and finally appears at the end of it. He is gentlemanly toward the grandmother and her family but nevertheless directs his henchmen to kill the family and later shoots and kills the grandmother himself.
- Bailey: The grandmother's son. Bailey drives the family car on their road trip to Florida, although "trips made him nervous". When the grandmother reveals that she recognizes The Misfit, Bailey curses at her.
- Bailey's wife: a nearly speechless wife and mother described as a "young woman in slacks, whose face was as broad and innocent as a cabbage". She is not identified by name, only as "the children's mother". Like her husband, she does little to discipline her children. In the car accident, she is thrown out of the car and breaks her shoulder.
- John Wesley and June Star: Bailey's older children, aged eight and seven, respectively, are rowdy and disrespectful. Their self-centeredness is so extreme that they are never aware that their mother, thrown out of the moving car during the accident, has a broken shoulder, and seem almost delighted that they got into a car accident, though disappointed that no one was killed in the crash. They have learned to manipulate their parents by screaming at them, behavior the grandmother has learned to use to her advantage.
- Red Sammy Butts, who initiates a dialogue with the grandmother that Robert C. Evans characterizes as a "festival of clichés" where "[e]very single one of his opening phrases is a commonplace platitude" that does, however, reveal his character as competitive, suspicious of others, and self-justifying. The dialogue is between two people who find each other likeable because they enjoy complaining together.
- The wife of the fat owner of The Tower is "a tall burnt-brown woman with hair and eyes lighter than her skin" who works as a waitress. Red Sammy directs his wife as if she were any ordinary waitress, preventing her from engaging in a sociable chat with Bailey's family.
- Hiram and Bobby Lee: convicts who escaped prison with The Misfit. The two kill Bailey, his wife and children, and on the murder of the grandmother by The Misfit, Bobby Lee suggests to The Misfit that killing her was enjoyable.

== Themes ==
=== Anguish, mercy, charity, divine grace, and imitation of God ===
==== The author's intent ====
In a 1960 response to a letter from novelist John Hawkes, Flannery O'Connor explained the significance of divine grace in Catholic theology in contrast to Protestant theology, and in doing so, explained the offers of grace made to the grandmother and The Misfit at the climax of the story immediately after the already agitated Misfit explained his anguish caused by not being able to witness whether or not Jesus is savior and that it was by faith alone that he decided Jesus is not savior:

Cutting yourself off from Grace is a very decided matter, required a real choice, act of will, and affecting the very ground of the soul. The Misfit is touched by the Grace that comes through the old lady when she recognizes him as her child, as she has been touched by the Grace that comes through him in his particular suffering.

As for The Misfit, O'Connor explained that the opportunity of grace is offered to him by the grandmother's touching him, an act she calls a gesture:

Her [the grandmother's] head clears for an instant and she realizes, even in her limited way, that she is responsible for the man before her and joined to him by ties of kinship which have their roots deep in the mystery she has been merely prattling about so far. And at this point, she does the right thing, she makes the right gesture.

O'Connor's reference to the "mystery" the grandmother prattled about is the incarnation of Jesus as savior as the means for people to be absolved for their sins in order to be eternally joined with God, and in that context, "kinship" refers to all people in that they are descendants of Adam and Eve who committed the sin that would forever separate humans from God and brought death upon humanity as a punishment for the original sin. O'Connor further clarified that the grandmother's actions were selfless: "... the grandmother is not in the least concerned with God but reaches out to touch the Misfit".

In her letter to John Hawkes, O'Connor explained that The Misfit did not accept the offer of grace in her story but that the grandmother's gesture did change him:

His [The Misfit's] shooting her is a recoil, a horror at her humanness, but after he has done it and cleaned his glasses, the Grace has worked in him and he pronounces his judgment: she would have been a good woman if he had been there every moment of her life.

==== Criticism ====
The grandmother's gesture toward The Misfit has been criticized as an unreasonable action by a character often perceived as intellectually, or morally, or spiritually incapable of doing it. For example, Stephen C. Bandy wrote in 1996, thirty-two years after the author's death:

... if one reads the story without prejudice, there would seem to be little here to inspire hope for redemption of any of its characters. No wishful search for evidence of grace or for epiphanies of salvation, by author or reader, can soften the harsh truth of 'A Good Man Is Hard To Find.' Its message is profoundly pessimistic and in fact subversive to the doctrines of grace and charity, despite heroic efforts to disguise that fact.

In addition, some critics like James Mellard resent O'Connor's efforts to explain the story to fill-in the narrative they expected to underlie the story's climax:

O'Connor simply tells her readers – either through narrative interventions or by extra-textual exhortations – how they are to interpret her work.

O'Connor's rebuttal was that such readers and critics have underestimated the grandmother. As indicated in her letters, lectures, readings, and essays, O'Connor felt compelled to explain the story and the gesture years after publication, for example, as "Reasonable Use of the Unreasonable", the title of her notes for a 1962 reading at Hollins College in Virginia. She wrote that the grandmother "lacked comprehension, but ... had a good heart", and that the ending gave her "a special kind of triumph ... which instinctively we do not allow to someone altogether bad." She concluded that the grandmother finally "does the right thing" at the end of her life, and expressed hope that like the parable of the mustard seed, the Misfit will eventually accept the grace extended to him.

O'Connor believed one understandable reason for the criticism is that the concept of grace she used is unique to a Roman Catholic perspective, as she clarified the point to John Hawkes in a letter:

In the Protestant view, I think Grace and nature don't have much to do with each other. The old lady, because of her hypocrisy and humanness and banality couldn't be a medium for Grace. In the sense that I see things the other way, I'm a Catholic writer.

By mentioning "nature", O'Connor refers to her anagogical vision, which she addresses the grandmother's spiritual life which has been enlivened by the threat to her life. She wrote in her reading notes:

The action or gesture I'm talking about would have to be on the anagogical level, that is, the level which has to do with the Divine life and our participation in it. It would be a gesture that transcended any neat allegory that might have been intended or any pat moral categories a reader could make. It would be a gesture which somehow made contact with mystery.

Robert C. Evans observed:

As its very title already suggests, 'A Good Man Is Hard to Find' (like much of O'Connor's fiction) is very much concerned with satirizing stale and clichéd uses of language. The characters who use clichés ... are all characters who tend to speak (and, more importantly, to think) in highly conventional and unoriginal ways. When O'Connor's characters mouth clichés ... that is a sign that they have ceased to think for themselves, if in fact they ever possessed any original thoughts to begin with.

Compared to the superficiality of the family that engages itself in comic books, television quiz shows (e.g., Queen for a Day), movies, and the newspaper's sport section, an original thought, often a dark truth like Red Sammy Butt's wife saying nobody on earth can be trusted "And I don't count nobody out of that, no nobody" looking at her husband, has both comic and dramatic effects on the reader. Evans noted, "A major purpose of the story will be to shake most of the characters, ... as well as O'Connor's readers, out of [a] kind of smug complacency."

== Response ==
In her essay "The Nature and Aim of Fiction", O'Connor described her goals for writing fiction. The essay is useful for helping readers understand how to approach and interpret her works. One of her major goals in writing was to construct elements of her fiction so they can be interpreted anagogically – her "anagogical vision":

The kind of vision the fiction writer needs to have, or to develop, in order to increase the meaning of his story is called anagogical vision, and that is the kind of vision that is able to see different levels of reality in one image or one situation. The medieval commentators on Scripture found three kinds of meaning in the literal level of the sacred text: one they called allegorical, in which one fact pointed to another; one they called tropological, or moral, which had to do with what should be done; and one they called anagogical, which had to do with the Divine life and our participation in it. Although this was a method applied to exegesis, it was also an attitude toward all of creation, and a way of reading nature... .

Peter M. Candler, Jr., summarized O'Connor's vision for readers – that all of the interpretations of her work are rooted in its literal sense: "...[F]or O'Connor, the literal in some sense already 'contains' the figurative. Far from being a level of meaning superadded to the literal sense, the 'spiritual sense' is already inherent in any attempt to render something artistically. 'A good story,' she wrote, 'is literal in the same sense a child's drawing is literal.'" In other words, O'Connor understood that her anagogical vision is a challenge to readers because they must not only understand the literal story but also associate the literal with their knowledge or experience. Consequently, "A Good Man Is Hard to Find" is enriched beyond its literal narrative when the literal can be related to biblical, Christian, Roman Catholic, Protestant, Southern society and its history, and other subjects.

The literal sense of the story's title and The Misfit's complaint, "If He [Jesus] did what He said, then it's nothing for you to do but throw away everything and follow Him" both appear in a more constructive context in the New Testament story of Jesus and the Rich Young Man, suggesting that searches for the deeper meanings of "A Good Man Is Hard to Find" might start there. At readings O'Connor offered suggestions about her intent at the literal level, such as for a 1963 reading at a Southern college with a highly respected creative writing program – Hollins College in Roanoke, Virginia:

I don't have any pretensions to being an Aeschylus or Sophocles and providing you in this story with a cathartic experience out of your mythic background, though this story I'm going to read certainly calls up a good deal of the South's mythic background, and it should elicit from you a degree of pity and terror, even though its way of being serious is a comic one. I do think, though, that like the Greeks you should know what is going to happen in this story so that any element of suspense in it will be transferred from its surface to its interior.

=== Epigraph ===
An example of the effect of O'Connor's anagogical vision is an epigraph she wrote for "A Good Man Is Hard to Find". The epigraph was published only in the paperback Three by Flannery O'Connor, which also included her two novels Wise Blood and The Violent Bear It Away, and appeared in September 1964, a month after her death, and eleven years after the short story was first published. The epigraph was probably included in compliance with her wishes upon her death. The epigraph reads:

The dragon is by the side of the road, watching those who pass. Beware lest he devour you. We go to the father of souls, but it is necessary to pass by the dragon.

— St. Cyril of Jerusalem

O'Connor used the epigraph to close her essay "The Fiction Writer and His Country", published in 1957 in The Living Novel: A Symposium, a book of statements by novelists on their art, where she followed the epigraph with the closing sentence: "No matter what form the dragon may take, it is of this mysterious passage past him, or his jaws, that stories of any depth will always be concerned to tell, and this being the case, it requires considerable courage at any time, in any place, not to turn away from the story teller." The statement indicates how O'Connor wanted her works read and for the reader to look for the dragon in her short-story collection A Good Man Is Hard to Find and Other Stories, in which at least nine of the ten stories are about original sin.

== Adaptations ==
A film adaptation of the short story "A Good Man Is Hard to Find", entitled Black Hearts Bleed Red, was made in 1992 by New York filmmaker Jeri Cain Rossi. The film stars noted New York artist Joe Coleman, but according to reviewers the film does not depict the story well.

The American folk musician Sufjan Stevens adapted the story into a song of the same title on his 2004 album Seven Swans. The song is written in the first person from the point of view of The Misfit.

In May 2017, Deadline Hollywood reported that director John McNaughton would make a feature film adaptation of the story starring Michael Rooker, from a screenplay by Benedict Fitzgerald.

In 1998 high school English teacher Andrew Grimm started up a band in Baltimore, Maryland, called "June Star," after Bailey's daughter.

== See also ==
- Ecclesiastes
- Methodism
- "On Slide Inn Road"
- Particular judgment
- Sheol
