= A Late Encounter with the Enemy =

Short story by Flannery O'Connor

- Short story by Flannery O'Connor
- Country: United States
- Language: English
- Genre: Southern Gothic

Publication
- Published in: Harper's Bazaar
- Publication type: Periodical
- Media type: Print (magazine)
- Publication date: September 1953

"A Late Encounter with the Enemy" is a short story by Flannery O'Connor. It was published in the September 1953 issue of Harper's Bazaar and republished in her short story collection A Good Man Is Hard to Find (1955). It is O'Connor's only story dealing with the American Civil War, and discusses the postbellum South's efforts to reclaim and whitewash its Confederate heritage in the 20th century. Its ending also reflects O'Connor's Roman Catholicism.

== Plot summary ==
General George Poker Sash is a 104-year-old veteran of the American Civil War. Afflicted by dementia, he remembers very little about the War or his family—at one point, he thinks to himself that the name "Lee" (that is, Robert E. Lee) must refer to a battle instead of a man. Even so, he is frequently invited to public celebrations of the Confederacy, which Southern dignitaries have repurposed into a socially acceptable symbol of white power. He has grown to like his role as a living memorial to the Confederacy, although he is mainly concerned with attracting the attention of beautiful women in the crowd.

The General's 62-year-old granddaughter, Sally Poker, is about to graduate from college after decades of summer school. She prays every night that the General lives long enough to sit on stage during her graduation ceremony as a testament to the superiority of her family lineage. The General arrogantly thinks to himself that he would not have attended Sally's graduation unless he had been invited to sit on stage as the guest of honor.

Sally reflects that the story of General Sash is a myth. He owns a general's uniform because when he was in his nineties, Hollywood advertisers asked him to pretend to be a general at the premiere of a new movie. The studio propagated a message of unity and reconciliation between North and South so that white Southerners would buy movie tickets. According to Sally, "General" Sash was at best a major, and even this may be a lie, as in a moment of lucidity, the General reflects that he might have been a foot soldier. Sally recalls that she cut short the General's appearance at the movie premiere because she wore the wrong shoes on stage and felt embarrassed. Even so, Sally trades on the "General" myth for her own purposes.

At the graduation, dignitaries use the General as a prop, telling white Southerners that they have a duty to remember a past that the General has himself forgotten. As Sally receives her diploma, the General experiences a revelation that he must look beyond the past, after which he quietly dies on stage. Sally does not learn her grandfather is dead until the ceremony is over. It is unclear if Sally ever gets beyond her prideful idolatry about her family heritage.

== Background ==
The story is loosely based upon a newspaper article about a Civil War veteran attending his wife's graduation that Flannery O'Connor read in the early 1950s. It is also the only O'Connor story to deal explicitly with a subject that is important to the works of many Southern writers – the Civil War.
