= Renascence (journal) =

- Discipline: Literary history, philosophy, theology
- Language: English
- Edited by: John E. Curran

Publication details
- History: 1948–present
- Publisher: Marquette University (United States)
- Frequency: Quarterly

Standard abbreviations
- ISO 4: Renascence

Indexing
- ISSN: 0034-4346 (print); 2329-8626 (web)
- LCCN: 5438373
- OCLC no.: 1763687

Links
- Journal homepage; Online access

Renascence is a peer-reviewed academic journal published by Marquette University's English Department, in cooperation with the Philosophy Documentation Center. The journal examines the interaction between literature, moral philosophy, and theology - its subtitle is "Essays on Values in Literature". It occasionally publishes special issues dedicated to particular intellectuals or literary figures, with a particular focus on work that has emerged from the Catholic tradition. All issues are available online.

== Abstracting and indexing ==
Renascence is abstracted and indexed in Academic Search, Arts and Humanities Citation Index, Catholic Periodical and Literature Index, Current Contents/Arts & Humanities, Humanities Abstracts, Humanities International Complete, Literary Reference Center, MLA International Bibliography, Periodicals Index Online, ProQuest 5000, and Scopus.

== See also ==
- List of philosophy journals
- List of theology journals
