= A Good Man Is Hard to Find and Other Stories =

1955 short story collection by Flannery O'Connor

A Good Man Is Hard to Find
- First edition cover
- Author: Flannery O'Connor
- Language: English
- Genre: Southern Gothic
- Published: 1955
- Publisher: Harcourt, Brace and Company
- Publication place: United States
- Media type: Print (hardcover)
- Pages: 256
- ISBN: 978-0156364652

A Good Man Is Hard to Find and Other Stories is a collection of short stories by American author Flannery O'Connor. The collection was first published in 1955 by Harcourt, Brace and Company. The subjects of the stories range from baptism ("The River") to serial killers ("A Good Man Is Hard to Find") to human greed and exploitation ("The Life You Save May Be Your Own"), although O'Connor described the ten-story collection as "nine stories about original sin, with my compliments".

The majority of the stories include jarring violent scenes that make the characters undergo a spiritual change. Influenced by O'Connor's Catholicism, the stories frequently complicate Catholic morals through life-or-death scenarios.

== Contents ==
It contains the following stories, all of which were previously published:

- "A Good Man Is Hard to Find" (anthology Modern Writing I, 1953)
- "The River" (The Sewanee Review, Summer 1953)
- "The Life You Save May Be Your Own" (The Kenyon Review, Spring 1953)
- "A Stroke of Good Fortune" (Tomorrow, August 1949, as "A Woman on the Stairs")
- "A Temple of the Holy Ghost" (Harper's Bazaar, May 1954)
- "The Artificial Nigger" (The Kenyon Review, Spring 1955)
- "A Circle in the Fire" (The Kenyon Review, Spring 1954)
- "A Late Encounter with the Enemy" (Harper's Bazaar, September 1953)
- "Good Country People" (Harper's Bazaar, June 1955)
- "The Displaced Person" (The Sewanee Review, Autumn 1954)

== Title ==
The title comes from a 1920s blues song.

The title was taken from the blues song, "A Good Man Is Hard to Find", written by Eddie Green and popularized by the singer Bessie Smith in 1927.

== Adaptations ==
A television adaptation of the short story "The Life You Save May Be Your Own", starring Gene Kelly, was broadcast on the CBS network's Schlitz Playhouse on March 1, 1957. O'Connor was not pleased with the results, as evidenced in a letter to a friend: "The best I can say for it is that it conceivably could have been worse. Just conceivably."

A short film adaptation of the story "A Good Man Is Hard to Find", titled "Black Hearts Bleed Red", was released in 1993. The film was directed by New York filmmaker Jeri Cain Rossi and stars noted New York artist Joe Coleman.

Musician Sufjan Stevens wrote a song titled "A Good Man Is Hard to Find" on his album Seven Swans; it is told from the viewpoint of the Misfit.

== See also ==
- Southern Gothic
- Southern literature
- The Grotesque
