= A View of the Woods =

Short story by Flannery O'Connor

- Short story by Flannery O'Connor
- Country: United States
- Language: English
- Genre: Southern Gothic

Publication
- Published in: Partisan Review
- Publication type: Literary journal
- Media type: Print (magazine)
- Publication date: Fall 1957

"A View of the Woods" is a short story by Flannery O'Connor. It was originally published in the Fall 1957 issue of Partisan Review, and republished in 1965 in her posthumous short story collection Everything That Rises Must Converge. In the story, a vindictive landowner torments his daughter's family by repeatedly selling the pastureland that his son-in-law's cattle need to survive. In the process, he ruins his relationship with his favorite granddaughter.

Critics have interpreted "A View of the Woods" in terms of themes common to O'Connor's writing and Southern Gothic fiction, namely genealogy, pride, identity, and control. Fortune despises his son-in-law, Mr. Pitts, and loves only his youngest granddaughter, Mary, whom he sees as an extension of himself; in his other grandchildren, he sees Pitts. Mary's combined Fortune and Pitts identity therefore becomes the focus of a struggle for loyalty and control.

== Publication history ==
O'Connor completed the story in the fall of 1956. She initially submitted it to Harper's Bazaar, although she correctly predicted that Harper's would reject it, as it was "a little grim" for the Harper's readership. Ultimately, Partisan Review published the story in fall 1957. It was later republished in The Best American Short Stories 1958 and O'Connor's posthumously-published short story collection Everything That Rises Must Converge.

== Plot summary ==
Elderly landowner Mark Fortune (Mr. Fortune), the story's unreliable narrator, lives on a large estate in rural Georgia with his daughter, son-in-law (Mr. Pitts), and grandchildren. Mr. Fortune dislikes Mr. Pitts and resents his daughter for marrying him. He goes out of his way to provoke Mr. Pitts, a cattle farmer who grazes his herd on the Fortune estate. He sells land to property developers, but never Mr. Pitts. At the start of the story, he sells a tract of pastureland right after Mr. Pitts clears it of weeds. He rationalizes the decision by telling himself that he is a paragon of progress who sells land to people who will modernize it, but he is at least partially motivated by his desire to remind his family who is in control.

Mr. Fortune approves of only one member of his family, his intelligent and stubborn nine-year-old granddaughter Mary Fortune Pitts (Mary Fortune). He believes in corporal punishment for his grandchildren but makes an exception for Mary Fortune. When Mr. Pitts belts her, Mr. Fortune hypocritically encourages her to fight back, but Mary Fortune stubbornly refuses to acknowledge that her father beats her at all.

Hoping to deal a "considerable blow" to Mr. Pitts' livelihood, Mr. Fortune decides to sell another pasture ("the lawn") to a Mr. Tilman, an entrepreneur with serpentine features who plans to open a gas station. Unusually, Mary Fortune challenges his decision, pointing out that the children play on the lawn and that the gas station will ruin the family home's view of the woods. When she adds that her father grazes his calves on the lawn, Mr. Fortune explodes in rage and calls Mr. Pitts a fool. The precocious Mary Fortune quotes the Bible at him ("He who calls his brother a fool is subject to hell fire"), (Note: Matthew 5:22.) and they begin lobbing Biblical insults at each other: Mr. Fortune calls Mary Fortune a "Jezebel", and Mary Fortune calls him the "Whore of Babylon". At home, Mary Fortune's parents blame her for the idea, and Mr. Pitts beats her.

Despite her beating, Mr. Fortune's decision to sell the lawn drives Mary Fortune closer to Mr. Pitts. Mr. Fortune cannot understand his granddaughter's feelings. He tries to buy back her affection with a gift, but she declines.

As Mr. Fortune closes the deal with Mr. Tilman, Mary Fortune begins throwing bottles at them. Mr. Fortune retaliates by trying to whip Mary Fortune. When she finally fights back, Mr. Fortune kills her by smashing her head against a rock, and suffers a heart attack.

== Analysis ==
Critics have interpreted the central conflict and climax of the story as one of self-reckoning. The qualities Fortune most admires in Mary he sees as reflections of himself (her strong will, independence, and obstinacy). He contrasts these with the qualities he despises in Pitts (weakness, shiftlessness, and dependency). Ultimately, the very qualities of himself that Fortune champions in Mary become turned against him as Mary doubles down and resists him absolutely at every turn, culminating in his vision of his own face fighting back at him through hers. Literary critic Preston M. Browning, Jr. describes the conflict:

"In "A View of the Woods" ... there is a conflict within the protagonist, so subtle and so threatening to his idealized self-image that he can acknowledge it only as annoying disobedience in his granddaughter. When he attempts to punish her, however, he discovers an "enemy within" which destroys him even as he (inadvertently) kills its embodiment in the child."
