= A Good Man Is Hard to Find (song) =

Single by Marion Harris
- B-side: "For Johnny and Me"
- Released: February 1919
- Label: Victor 18535
- Songwriter: Eddie Green

"A Good Man Is Hard to Find" is a song written by African-American songwriter and later actor Eddie Green, and first published in 1917. It was first recorded by Marion Harris in 1919. It is regarded as "one of the classic blues standards from the Roaring Twenties".

== History ==
The song was written by Green "in a bluesy style", and was first copyrighted in December 1917. It was initially available as a piano roll. By January 1919, the sheet music was reputed to have sold one million copies. Green also used the song in a Broadway show in 1927.

The recording by Harris – the first widely-known white singer to sing blues songs – for Victor Records was released in February 1919. Other popular early recordings were made by Wilbur Sweatman's Original Jazz Band (1919), Ernest Hare (1919), Ted Lewis (1928), and Bessie Smith (1928). The song became the signature tune of Sophie Tucker, who also first sang it in 1919.

Among later recordings of the song are those by Fats Waller (1939), Cass Daley (1949), Frank Sinatra and Shelley Winters in the film Meet Danny Wilson (1952), Teresa Brewer (1955), Brenda Lee (1959), Nancy Wilson (1962), Alberta Hunter (1980), and Maria Muldaur (2007). There are at least 150 recorded versions of the song.

The inversion of the phrase, as "A hard man is good to find", is generally attributed, though with some uncertainty, to Mae West, or possibly to Sophie Tucker.

The song's title was used as the title of a 1953 short story by Flannery O'Connor.

The title was reused for a song by Bruce Springsteen recorded in 1982 that was not released until his Tracks box set release in 1998.

The Flannery O'Connor story inspired a song of the same name released by Sufjan Stevens on the 2004 album Seven Swans.

The song was featured in the 2020 Canadian survival horror movie Butchers.
