= A Circle in the Fire =

Short story by Flannery O'Connor

- Short story by Flannery O'Connor
- Country: United States
- Language: English
- Genre: Southern Gothic

Publication
- Published in: The Kenyon Review
- Publication type: Literary journal
- Media type: Print (magazine)
- Publication date: Spring 1954

"A Circle in the Fire" is a short story by Flannery O'Connor. It was first published in the Spring 1954 issue of The Kenyon Review, and was included in her 1955 short story collection A Good Man is Hard to Find. In the story, an affluent, self-righteous, and racist landowner is punished for her idolatry of wealth and lack of charity.

== Plot summary ==
The story is told from the perspective of Sally, a young girl whose mother, Mrs. Cope, owns a farm in the American South. Mrs. Cope frequently argues with one of her employees, Mrs. Pritchard. Mrs. Cope is devoutly Christian, arrogant, and self-righteous, while Mrs. Pritchard is gloomy and superstitious. Mrs. Cope insists on looking on the bright side at all times, but in a condescending way (she frequently remarks on how lucky she is to have a better life than other people), while Mrs. Pritchard seems almost happier when things go wrong. Mrs. Cope is also rude and racist to her Black farmhands.

One day, three teenage boys visit the farm. Their leader is Powell Boyd, the son of one of Mrs. Cope's former farm workers. Powell explains that his father died after moving to Florida and that their mother has remarried and moved to Atlanta. The boys visit the farm because Powell frequently reminisces about his time there. The boys are traveling alone, and the story occasionally indicates that Powell is unhappy with his family situation and is looking for a new home. However, Mrs. Cope and Mrs. Pritchard see the boys' neediness as a form of mooching. The boys eventually request to sleep in the barn, promising to leave in the morning, but Mrs. Cope refuses and tells them to sleep outside.

In the morning, the boys refuse to leave. Instead, they commit various acts of mischief. They drink milk and play with the farm's horses without permission. When Mrs. Cope tries to chase them away, they retaliate by releasing her bull and vandalizing her tractors. Although they eventually leave the property, they proceed to throw rocks at Mrs. Cope's mailbox from across the property line. Mrs. Pritchard gloats that there is nothing Mrs. Cope can do to stop them.

While walking in the nearby woods, Sally sees the boys plotting something. Powell ominously says that if the farm did not exist, he would no longer have to think about it. The boys set fire to the woods. The Black farmhands, who dislike Mrs. Cope, do the bare minimum to put out the fire. Sally runs to her mother, whose facial expression indicates that she has been brought down to the level of the people she previously prided herself on being superior to. The scene reminds Sally of the story from the Book of Daniel where the evil King Nebuchadnezzar unsuccessfully burns three prophets in a fiery furnace when they refuse to worship the King's idol.
