= The Displaced Person =

Short story by Flannery O'Connor

- Short story by Flannery O'Connor
- Country: United States
- Language: English
- Genre: Southern Gothic

Publication
- Published in: The Sewanee Review
- Publication type: Literary journal
- Media type: Print (magazine)
- Publication date: Autumn 1954

"The Displaced Person" is a novella by Flannery O'Connor. It was first published in shorter form in the Autumn 1954 issue of The Sewanee Review, and expanded into three parts for her 1955 collection A Good Man Is Hard to Find. It tells the story of a struggling landowner who hires a Polish Catholic refugee ("displaced person") to revitalize her failing farm. The refugee's talent and hard work alarm the American-born farmhands, who appeal to the community's racial, ethnic, nationalist, and religious prejudices to save their own jobs. Although a Catholic priest appeals to the landowner's sense of charity, the landowner finds that her capitalist self-interest is a more persuasive argument against prejudice.

To write the story, O'Connor drew from her personal Catholicism and her family's experience hiring a Polish refugee family after World War II.

== Plot summary ==
=== Part One ===
In post-World War II Georgia, (Note: The exact date is not stated, but one character refers to World War I as the "first" World War, implying that a second has already taken place. In addition, Mrs. McIntyre has a vision of Europeans in boxcars, an allusion to the Holocaust.) farm owner Mrs. McIntyre hires Mr. Guizac, a Polish refugee from the Soviet Union (the "displaced person"), to work as a farmhand. Mr. Guizac's industriousness outshines the other farmhands (both black and white), whom Mrs. McIntyre generally holds in contempt.

Mrs. McIntyre is particularly upset at Mr. Shortley, a white farmhand whose side job distilling liquor distracts him from his duties at the farm. His wife, Mrs. Shortley, tries to save her family's jobs with identity politics. Although she is not a devout Protestant, she targets Mr. Guizac's Roman Catholicism, hoping to prejudice Mrs. McIntyre against Catholics. This effort fails since Mrs. McIntyre is not religious. Mrs. Shortley also warns the African-American farmhands that immigrants will take their jobs, but then betrays them by encouraging the white Mrs. McIntyre to fire the black farmhands first. She eventually begins seeing apocalyptic visions, including a vision of the Ophanim.

One day, Mrs. Shortley overhears a conversation between Mrs. McIntyre and the Catholic priest who brought Mr. Guizac to the United States. Mrs. McIntyre confides that she likes Mr. Guizac because as a refugee, he cannot afford to be lazy. She adds that she will fire Mr. Shortley so that she can give the Pole a raise. Mrs. Shortley orders the family to pack up and leave before Mrs. McIntyre can fire them.

=== Part Two ===
Mrs. McIntyre reflects on the precariousness of her social position. A secretary by trade, she married a prominent man for his money, but when he died, the farm was all he had left. Her other two marriages ended in failure. Although the farm's fortunes are in decline, she clings to her bygone affluence. She complains that lazy American-born workers have drained the farm of its wealth, and hopes that industrious immigrants like Mr. Guizac can restore her fortunes.

The black farmhands react to Mr. Guizac in different ways. The elderly Astor tries to prejudice Mrs. McIntyre against immigrants. The younger Sulk pays Mr. Guizac to broker an engagement with Mr. Guizac's (white) cousin, who sees an American marriage as a way to escape her Polish refugee camp. The prospect of an interracial marriage on the farm scandalizes Mrs. McIntyre, who concludes that the Pole is no different from any of the other white trash (in her view) she has previously hired and fired. She threatens to fire him unless he breaks up the engagement.

=== Part Three ===
For some time now, the Catholic priest has been trying to convert the nonbelieving Mrs. McIntyre. He encourages her to let Mr. Guizac stay as an act of Christian charity, but Mrs. McIntyre resists, dismissing Christ as "just another [displaced person]". One day, the priest sees Mrs. McIntyre's pet peacock (a traditional Christian symbol of the Resurrection) and is reminded of the Transfiguration and Christ's sacrifice.

Mr. Shortley abruptly returns, announcing that his wife has died of a stroke. Mrs. McIntyre rehires him, promising that she will fire Mr. Guizac. However, she cannot bring herself to get rid of the Pole, who continues to outperform the other farmhands. Demanding preferential treatment as a World War I veteran, Mr. Shortley rallies the neighborhood to call for Mr. Guizac's termination. Despite pressure from the locals, Mrs. McIntyre still refuses to fire Mr. Guizac; it is implied that her conscience was pricked by a vision of the Holocaust in a dream. Mr. Shortley's patience runs out. With Sulk's tacit approval and Mrs. McIntyre's acquiescence, he kills his rival by running him over with a tractor. His victory is temporary, as he is soon forced to flee, along with the other farmhands.

Without her employees, Mrs. McIntyre is forced to sell the farm and suffers a nervous breakdown. As her health fails, the only person who regularly visits her is the Catholic priest, who patiently sits with her in the hope that she will convert someday.

== Analysis ==
The story was written while O'Connor was residing with her mother at a farm called Andalusia. Scholars believe that the farm was the inspiration for the setting in "The Displaced Person" and is the work most closely associated with Andalusia. O'Connor's mother also employed a Polish refugee family and several African American laborers at Andalusia.

Flannery O'Connor was fascinated with peacocks, described in her essay "The King of the Birds." In the story, the way the characters view the peacocks often corresponds to their own moral compass. For example, Father Flynn and Astor have positive attitudes towards the birds and are generally likable characters, while Mrs. McIntyre starves the birds and reduces their population, making her a villain.

== Adaptation ==
The story was adapted and released in 1977 as a Public Television production for the series The American Short Story, starring Irene Worth and Shirley Stoler. The cast also includes John Houseman, Robert Earl Jones, and Samuel L. Jackson. It was filmed at Andalusia.

== See also ==
- Anti-miscegenation laws in the United States
