= The Partridge Festival =

Short story by Flannery O'Connor

- Short story by Flannery O'Connor
- Country: United States
- Language: English
- Genre: Southern Gothic

Publication
- Published in: The Critic
- Publication type: Literary journal
- Media type: Print (magazine)
- Publication date: February–March 1961

"The Partridge Festival" is a short story by Flannery O'Connor. It was published in 1961 in The Critic, a Catholic magazine. A devout Roman Catholic, O'Connor often used religious themes in her work.

== Plot summary ==
Calhoun, a twenty-three-year-old writer, visits his two doting great-aunts at the start of the story and first comes across them admiring azaleas from the front porch. Calhoun has made the trip home to write about the Azalea Festival (which his great-grandfather founded) in Partridge, and the murders that occurred ten days prior to his arrival. At that festival's pretend court, Singleton was mockingly accused of not purchasing an Azalea Festival Badge and locked in an outhouse as punishment. Several days later, Singleton shot five festival organizers and one innocent bystander and was sent to the state mental hospital.

Calhoun's aunts introduce him to Mary Elizabeth, a neighbor, who is supposed to accompany him to the festival. Calhoun and Mary are annoyed with each other but proceed to the festival, where they discover they are both secretly researching pieces that they are writing. Both are sympathetic with Singleton, who is described by both as a Christ-like figure, not the bad man that the townspeople believe him to be. After discovering this, they persuade each other into making a trip the next morning to visit Singleton at the mental hospital, and upon arrival at the facility Mary Elizabeth tells Singleton that she "understands." At this point, Singleton tries to assault Mary Elizabeth and tells her that he'll make her a queen on the festival float. Calhoun and Mary abruptly leave and when they look at each other's faces down the road, Calhoun sees himself as a naive salesman, not the individualist he regarded his idol Singleton as.
