= The Comforts of Home =

Short story by Flannery O'Connor

- Short story by Flannery O'Connor
- Country: United States
- Language: English
- Genre: Southern Gothic

Publication
- Published in: The Kenyon Review
- Publication type: Literary journal
- Media type: Print (magazine)
- Publication date: Autumn 1960

"The Comforts of Home" is a short story by Flannery O'Connor. It was originally published in the Autumn 1960 issue of The Kenyon Review and republished in 1965 in O'Connor's posthumous short story collection Everything That Rises Must Converge. In the story, a compassionate woman tries to save a troubled girl, but is resisted at every turn by her son, whose callousness is intensified by the patriarchal impulses of the surrounding society.

== Plot summary ==
Local historian Thomas lives with his mother. His parents had very different personalities: his mother is kind and self-sacrificing, while his late father was callous, unscrupulous, and hot-tempered. Thomas tries to strike a balance between his father's ruthlessness and his mother's selflessness, both of which he deems excessive. He attributes his mother's compassion to the fact that she is not an intellectual.

When nineteen-year-old drifter Sarah Ham (who fancifully calls herself Star Drake) is arrested for passing bad checks, Thomas' mother springs into action. Sarah has many issues—she is a nymphomaniac, a liar, and possibly an alcoholic. Thomas' mother appears to be the only person in the story who feels compassion towards Sarah. She does everything she can to help Sarah get her life back on track. She arranges for Sarah to be paroled out of jail, but the local boarding house evicts Sarah for drunkenness and tells everyone else in town to turn her away, leaving Thomas' mother as the only person in town who will take her in.

Thomas loathes Sarah and is rude to her face. Sarah begins flirting with him, which disturbs him. He is consumed by thoughts of his father, a patriarchal figure who believed that men should dominate the house. He concludes that his father would have gotten rid of Sarah by framing her for a crime. Thomas' mother does not want her son to grow up to be like her father, and is dismayed by Thomas' moral decline.

After several days of emotional cruelty from Thomas, Sarah tells him that she is considering suicide. Thomas flippantly encourages her to do it. This prompts Sarah to attempt suicide, which only intensifies the mother's resolve to keep her safe. When Sarah returns, Thomas audibly suggests that she should shoot herself with his father's old pistol. That evening, a naked Sarah tries to seduce him in his bedroom. Thomas tells his mother that if she does not evict Sarah, he will leave. After six hours, his mother returns with Sarah in tow.

Thomas cannot find the gun, and thinks Sarah stole it. He convinces the sheriff—a male chauvinist, like his father—to search Sarah's room. Before the sheriff arrives, he finds the gun; he may have misplaced it himself. Egged on by a vision of his father, Thomas decides to frame Sarah for theft by sneaking the gun into her bag. However, Sarah catches him. They argue with each other in front of Thomas' mother. During the argument, Sarah lunges for the bag. Thomas pulls out the gun and shoots. Thomas' mother jumps in front of Sarah and takes the bullet for her.

The sheriff arrives. Because he cannot comprehend the mother's sacrifice, he incorrectly concludes that Thomas plotted to kill his mother and blame his lover Sarah for the crime.
