= A Temple of the Holy Ghost =

Short story by Flannery O'Connor

- Short story by Flannery O'Connor
- Country: United States
- Language: English
- Genre: Southern Gothic

Publication
- Published in: Harper's Bazaar
- Publication type: Magazine
- Media type: Print
- Publication date: May 1954

"A Temple of the Holy Ghost" is a short story by Flannery O'Connor. It was first published in the May 1954 issue of Harper's Bazaar, and is included in her 1955 collection A Good Man Is Hard to Find. Although O'Connor was a devout Roman Catholic who often used religious themes in her work, "A Temple of the Holy Ghost" is one of her few explicitly Catholic stories.

O'Connor frequently wrote about white Protestant characters with negative personality traits—including racism, arrogance, and condescension—and the Southern white Catholics in "A Temple of the Holy Ghost" display many of the same negative traits. Through the divine revelation that closes the story, O'Connor concludes that Southern Catholics' negativity does not reflect authentic Christian principles.

== Plot summary ==
A 12-year-old girl (hereafter "the girl") hosts her cousins, 14-year-old Susan and Joanne, for the weekend. The girl dismisses the cousins as shallow and self-absorbed. However, the girl is rude and immature. She harbors a malicious streak and racist beliefs about Black Americans.

Susan and Joanne explain that the puritanical nuns at their Catholic convent school taught them to resist amorous boys by proclaiming that their bodies are "temples of the Holy Ghost". (Note: 1 Corinthians 6:19-20.) The cousins are obsessed with boys and find the lesson amusing, but the girl is too young to understand the humor.

The girl's mother arranges for two neighborhood boys, Wendell and Cory, to take the cousins to the local fair for entertainment. The three girls, who are Catholics, look down on the boys for their Church of God beliefs, which the girl considers anti-intellectual. (Note: Poet Elizabeth Bishop, a contemporary of O'Connor's, wrote that the Church of God was particularly notable for its mixed-race congregations and its Charismatic teachings, including speaking in tongues. She added that after learning about the Church of God, "nothing Flannery O'Connor ever wrote could seem at all exaggerated to me.") The girl insults Wendell's religion to his face (she is also publicly rude towards Baptists) and refuses to eat dinner with the boys, prompting the family cook to comment on her rudeness. In addition, when the boys sing an English hymn ("The Lily of the Valley"), Susan and Joanne attempt to prove the superiority of Catholicism by singing a Latin hymn (Tantum ergo).

Wendell, Cory, Susan, and Joanne leave for the fair. The girl resentfully stays at home. She admits to herself that she has many negative personality traits, especially pride, rudeness, sloth, and lying. She dreams of being a martyr, reasoning that it will be easier than being a saint.

When Susan and Joanne return, they tell the girl about the fair's freak show. One exhibit, a hermaphrodite, told visitors that God made them that way and that "I got to make the best of it". As the girl drifts off to sleep, she dreams of the hermaphrodite, who addresses a crowd like a saintly preacher and tells the people that they are also temples of the Holy Ghost.

The next day, the family attends Benediction of the Blessed Sacrament. While the Eucharistic Host is being reverenced, the girl ponders the hermaphrodite's statement that "This is the way [God] wanted me to be." A nun hugs her, leaving an indentation in the girl's skin in the shape of the nun's crucifix. On the way back, the driver remarks that local preachers had the police shut down the freak show. The girl notices that the setting sun resembles a communion wafer. The end of the story may imply that the girl is beginning to accept other people's differences as the will of God.
