= Wise Blood =

1952 novel by Flannery O'Connor

- First edition
- Author: Flannery O'Connor
- Language: English
- Genre: Southern Gothic novel
- Publisher: Harcourt, Brace & Company
- Publication date: May 15, 1952
- Publication place: United States
- Media type: Print (hardback & paperback)
- Pages: 238
- OCLC: 1191239
- LC Class: PZ4.O183 Wi PS3565.C57

Wise Blood is the first novel by the American author Flannery O'Connor, published in 1952. The novel was assembled from disparate stories first published in Mademoiselle, The Sewanee Review and Partisan Review. The first chapter is an expanded version of a story from her Master's thesis, "The Train", and other chapters are reworked versions of "The Peeler", "The Heart of the Park" and "Enoch and the Gorilla". The novel concerns a returning World War II veteran who, haunted by a life-long crisis of faith, resolves to form an anti-religious ministry in an eccentric, fictionalized city in the Southern United States after finding his family homestead abandoned without a trace.

The novel received little critical attention when it first appeared but has since come to be appreciated as a classic work of "low comedy and high seriousness" with disturbing religious themes. It was placed 62nd in The Observer's list of 100 greatest novels.

== Plot summary ==
Recently discharged from service in World War II and surviving on a government pension for unspecified battle wounds, Hazel Motes returns to his family home in Tennessee to find it abandoned. Leaving behind a note claiming a chifforobe as his private property, Motes boards a train for Taulkinham. The grandson of a traveling preacher, Motes grew up struggling with doubts regarding salvation and original sin; following his experiences at war, Motes has become an avowed atheist and intends to spread a gospel of antireligion. Despite his aversion to all trappings of Christianity, he constantly contemplates theological issues and finds himself compelled to purchase a hat and suit that cause others to mistake him for a minister.

In Taulkinham, Motes finds an address in a bathroom stall and seeks out Leora Watts, a prostitute. He enters her house, sits on her bed, and places his hand on her shoe without speaking to her first. He befriends Enoch Emery, a manic, 18-year-old zookeeper forced to come to the city after his abusive father kicked him out of their house. Emery introduces Motes to the concept of "wise blood", an idea that he has innate, worldly knowledge of what direction to take in life, and requires no spiritual or emotional guidance.

Emery and Motes witness the ostensibly blind preacher Asa Hawks and his 15-year-old daughter Sabbath Lily crash a street vendor's potato peeler demonstration to advertise for their ministry. Motes finds himself drawn to the pair, which Hawks attributes to a repressed desire for religious salvation. Angry, Motes begins shouting blasphemies to the crowd, declaring that he will found his own anti-God street preaching ministry. Motes' declarations are lost on everyone except for Emery, who becomes infatuated with the idea. He begins to more aggressively pursue his ministry, purchasing a dilapidated Essex to use as a mobile pulpit, preaching from the hood of the car at various street corners.

After Leora destroys his hat for her own amusement, Motes moves into the boarding house where Asa and Sabbath Lily live. Motes becomes fixated on Sabbath Lily and begins spending time with her. Asa has Sabbath Lily give Motes an old newspaper clipping announcing his intention to blind himself with quicklime at a revival meeting to detach himself from worldly pursuits. Initially intending to seduce Sabbath Lily in order to corrupt her spiritual purity, Motes discovers that she is in fact interested in him.

Now skeptical of her and of her father's entire ministry, Motes slips into Hawks' room one night and finds him without his sunglasses on, with perfectly intact eyes: Hawks faltered when he had attempted to blind himself because his faith was not strong enough, and ultimately left the ministry to become a con artist. His secret found out, Asa flees town, leaving Sabbath Lily to fend for herself. She moves in with Motes, eventually sleeping with him.

Meanwhile, Emery, believing that Motes' church needs a worldly "prophet", breaks into a museum and steals a mummified dwarf, which he begins keeping under his sink. He ultimately presents it to Sabbath Lily to give to Motes on his behalf; when she appears to Motes cradling it in her arms in a parody of the Madonna and Child, Motes experiences a violent revulsion to the image and destroys the mummy, throwing its remnants out the window.

Inspired by Motes' fledgling street ministry, local con artist Hoover Shoats renames himself Onnie Jay Holy and forms his own ministry, the "Holy Church of Christ Without Christ", which he encourages the disenfranchised to join for a donation of $1. The absurdity amuses passersby and they begin to join as a joke. This angers Motes, who wants to legitimately spread his message of antireligion. Despite Motes' protests, Holy moves to the next level in promoting his ministry, hiring an unemployed, consumptive man to dress up like Motes and act as his "Prophet".

During a rainstorm, Emery seeks refuge under a theater marquee, and learns that a gorilla will be brought there to promote a new jungle movie. An excited Emery stands in line to shake the animal's hand, but is startled to find that the gorilla is actually a man in a costume who, unprovoked, tells Emery to "go to hell." The incident causes Emery's "wise blood" to give him some inarticulated revelation, and he seeks out a program of the "gorilla"'s future appearances. That night, Emery stalks the man to another theater, stabs him with a sharpened umbrella handle, and steals his costume. Emery takes the costume out to the woods, strips naked and buries his clothes in a shallow "grave" before dressing up as the gorilla. Satisfied with his new appearance, he comes out of the woods and attempts to greet a couple on a date by shaking their hand. Emery is disappointed when they flee in terror, and finds himself alone on a rock overlooking Taulkinham.

Back in town, Motes angrily watches as Holy begins to grow rich from his new ministry. One night he follows Holy's "prophet", who drives a car resembling Motes's. He runs the car off the road. When the man exits the car, the stronger, more forceful Motes threatens him and orders him to strip. The man begins to comply, but Motes is overcome by a sudden rage and repeatedly runs the man over. Exiting the car to ensure he is dead, Motes is startled when the dying man begins confessing his sins to Motes.

The next day, Motes is pulled over by a policeman who claims to be citing him for driving without a license. He orders Motes to drive to a nearby cliff, orders him to get out and then, remarking that someone without a license does not need a car, pushes it off the cliff. The incident, coupled with the prophet's death, causes Motes to become sullen and withdrawn. Motes purchases a tin bucket and sack of quicklime and returns to the boarding house. Completing the action that Hawks could not finish, Motes blinds himself.

During an extended period of living as an ascetic at the boarding house, he begins walking around with barbed wire wrapped around his torso and sharp rocks and pebbles in his shoes. After paying for his room and board, he throws away any remaining money from his military pension. Believing that Motes has gone insane, the landlady, Mrs. Flood, hatches a plot to marry him, collect on his pension, and have him committed to an insane asylum. In attempting to seduce Motes, Mrs. Flood instead falls in love with him. After she suggests to Motes that they marry and she care for him, he wanders off into a thunderstorm.

Motes is found three days later, lying in a ditch and suffering from exposure. Angry at being asked to return what they believe is a mentally ill indigent, one of the cops who find Motes strikes him in the head with his baton. Motes dies in the police car en route to the boarding house. When the body is presented to Mrs. Flood, she mistakenly thinks he is still alive. She has Motes placed in bed and cares for his corpse, telling him he can live with her for as long as he likes, free of charge.

== Literary context ==
Wise Blood began with four separate stories published in Mademoiselle, The Sewanee Review, and Partisan Review in 1948 and 1949.

Originally committed to Rinehart & Company, O'Connor's agent and Robert Giroux convinced Rinehart to release the novel, and it was published as a complete novel by Harcourt, Brace & Company in 1952. Signet advertised it as "A Searching Novel of Sin and Redemption".

== Themes ==
In the introduction to the 10th anniversary publication of Wise Blood, O'Connor states that the book is about freedom, free will, life and death, and the inevitability of contention regarding belief and disbelief. Themes of redemption, racism, sexism, and isolation also run through the novel.

== Adaptations ==
A film was made of Wise Blood in 1979, directed by John Huston, and starring Brad Dourif as Hazel Motes and John Huston himself as the evangelist grandfather. Sabbath Lily was played by Amy Wright. Shot mostly in Macon, Georgia, it is a fairly literal filming of the novel.

An immersive opera and gallery installation, WISE BLOOD , libretto adapted from the novel by Anthony Gatto, was commissioned by Walker Art Center and The Soap Factory (Minneapolis, Minnesota USA) in May and June 2015. From the Soap Factory website: "Visual artist Chris Larson and composer Anthony Gatto join forces to bring the darkly humorous world of Flannery O'Connor's WISE BLOOD to life. Set in the post-industrial beauty of a 130-year-old factory space turned art gallery, this immersive opera takes the audience on a journey alongside the eccentric and always captivating characters of this story. The audience is brought directly into, around and through large scale installation pieces, kinetic sculptures and projections. WISE BLOOD features an incredibly diverse cast of performers. The musicians of the Adam Meckler orchestra, Youngblood Brass Band, provide the musical core to this Southern Gothic Tale."

== Popular culture ==
The professional name of singer-songwriter Natalie Laura Mering, Weyes Blood, was inspired by the novel.

Melbourne musician Keith Glass used the pseudonym Onie J. Holy, a con artist/preacher in Wise Blood. An album God, Guns and Guts was released in 1987.

Heavy metal band Corrosion of Conformity released an album entitled Wiseblood in 1996.

PJ Harvey cited the novel as a huge inspiration for her writing on her 1995 album To Bring You My Love.

Red Label Catharsis named its second album and title track, "Jesus Made it Beautiful To Haunt Her" directly from one specific page in Wiseblood where Sabbath Lily tells Hazel a story about a mother who strangles her baby.

The song "Fate Is.." by North Carolinian band Wednesday makes several lyrical references to the novel.

== Relevant sources ==
- Foran, Scott Michael. The Shadow Side of Grace: Flannery O’Connor’s Wise Blood as Nekyia. Macon, GA: Mercer University Press. 2026.
