= The Artificial Nigger =

Short story by Flannery O'Connor

- Short story by Flannery O'Connor
- Country: United States
- Language: English
- Genre: Southern Gothic

Publication
- Published in: The Kenyon Review
- Publication type: Literary journal
- Media type: Print (magazine)
- Publication date: Spring 1955

"The Artificial Nigger" is a short story by Flannery O'Connor. It was first published in the Spring 1955 issue of The Kenyon Review, and is included in her 1955 collection A Good Man Is Hard to Find. The title refers to statues popular in the Jim Crow-era Southern United States, depicting grotesque minstrelsy characters. In the story, an impressionable young boy and his ignorant, fearful grandfather visit Atlanta. The grandfather betrays the boy, sundering their relationship, but they bond over their shared unfamiliarity with black people, and the grandfather experiences a spiritual revelation about his own moral depravity. O'Connor said it was her favorite of the stories she had written.

== Plot summary ==
Mr. Head lives in the Georgia countryside with his grandson Nelson. A long time ago, Mr. Head's daughter ran away from home to Atlanta, showed up one day with the infant Nelson, and died within a year, forcing Mr. Head to raise Nelson himself. Mr. Head loathes Atlanta, but Nelson grows fascinated with it. When Nelson turns ten, Mr. Head decides to take Nelson to see the city, hoping that the trip will teach Nelson to hate and fear Atlanta like he does.

Mr. Head thinks highly of himself, but he has little experience with the outside world. He lives in a sundown county, where blacks have been banned for the last twelve years; as such, Nelson has never seen a black person. In addition, Mr. Head has not been to Atlanta in fifteen years and has only been there three times. Their town is so remote that trains normally do not stop there.

On the train, Mr. Head pettily mocks Nelson's ignorance in front of the other passengers. However, Mr. Head is insecure about his own ignorance. Nelson sees a black person for the first time, but Mr. Head has taught Nelson to dislike black people, and Nelson's fear of the unfamiliar pushes him closer to Mr. Head. When Mr. Head mistreats a black waiter on the train, Nelson's respect for his grandfather grows.

After getting off the train, Mr. Head and Nelson walk around downtown Atlanta, but Mr. Head is unfamiliar with the streets and the pair walk in circles. Mr. Head refuses to take Nelson inside any buildings, because during his first trip to Atlanta, he got lost in a large store and was mocked by the locals. Nelson persuades Mr. Head to take a detour, which leads them to a black neighborhood. To Mr. Head's dismay, Nelson is fascinated by a black woman that he meets on the way. Although the two are lost, Mr. Head scolds Nelson for asking a black person for directions, and they continue walking aimlessly.

When Nelson takes a nap, Mr. Head decides to teach Nelson a lesson by walking away and pretending that he has stranded Nelson in Atlanta. When Nelson wakes up, he panics and starts running. He bowls into an elderly woman and breaks her ankle. A crowd gathers and demands to know who is responsible for Nelson (and the victim's medical bills). Mr. Head appears and Nelson clings to him for support, but Mr. Head coldly denies knowing him. The betrayal is so obvious that the crowd stops haranguing Nelson out of pity.

Nelson and Mr. Head resume walking in silence. Mr. Head is wracked by guilt, and Nelson rejects his attempts to reconcile. Mr. Head finally finds a white person to ask for directions, and the two arrive at the train station. Along the way, they pass by a plaster statue of a caricatured black man (the namesake of the story). Nelson is fascinated by the figure, and Mr. Head bonds with him over their shared fear of the unfamiliar (i.e., black people), thus repairing their relationship. Mr. Head treats the moment as a spiritual revelation, reflecting that he understands mercy for the first time. Humbled by the experience, he realizes that "he had never thought himself a great sinner before but he saw now that his true depravity had been hidden from him lest it cause him despair." Nelson resolves to never visit Atlanta again.

== In popular culture ==
In the 2023 film American Fiction, the film's first scene shows the protagonist, black college professor Thelonious Ellison, trying to lead a class discussion on "The Artificial Nigger". His efforts are disrupted by a white student who, although not having actually read the story, repeatedly expresses discomfort that the word nigger is written on the class board. Ellison tries to reason with her: "With all respect, Brittany, I got over it, I'm pretty sure you can too", but to no avail. After losing his temper, she storms out of the class, and, as a result, he is suspended from his job.
