= The Enduring Chill =

Short story by Flannery O'Connor

- Short story by Flannery O'Connor
- Country: United States
- Language: English
- Genre: Southern Gothic

Publication
- Published in: Harper's Bazaar
- Publication type: Magazine
- Media type: Print
- Publication date: July 1958

"The Enduring Chill" is a short story by Flannery O'Connor. It was originally published in the July 1958 issue of Harper's Bazaar and republished in 1965 in O'Connor's posthumous short story collection Everything That Rises Must Converge. It tells the story of a snobbish and uninspired writer who tries to fill his spiritual and intellectual needs with an idolatry of art, only to realize that he has caused much of his own suffering. A devout Roman Catholic, O'Connor said that the story was about a man who tries to find "religious substitutes for religion" until his "artistic delusions come face to face with reality".

O'Connor planned to write a sequel to "The Enduring Chill", but these plans were cut short by her early death. She adapted elements of the story for the unfinished novel Why do the Heathen Rage?, fragments of which were published in 2024.

== Development and publication history ==
O'Connor began writing the story in the fall of 1957. Around this time, she was very interested in the works of Catholic theologian Romano Guardini, and "The Enduring Chill" may reflect the influence of Guardini's view of Catholic dogma. Explaining the story, O'Connor wrote to Professor Ted Spivey that in a world with "religious substitutes for religion ... [t]here's nowhere to latch on to". The story has also been compared to James Joyce's A Portrait of the Artist as a Young Man, which features a young artist who sees his vocation as a kind of priesthood.

"The Enduring Chill" was published in the July 1958 issue of Harper's Bazaar.

== Plot summary ==
Twenty-five-year-old Asbury Fox returns to the fictional Southern town of Timberboro after coming down with a serious illness. Years ago, he left a comfortable life at his mother's dairy farm and moved to New York City, hoping to become a professional writer. However, he lacks talent and publishes nothing.

Broke and convinced he is dying, Asbury returns home to settle his last accounts. He burns his unpublished works and writes a long letter to his mother blaming her parenting for his failures in life, which he plans for her to read after his death. (Note: Asbury models the letter on Letter to His Father by Franz Kafka. The letter also badly misquotes The Second Coming by Yeats.) He hopes that his criticisms will give his mother an "enduring chill" that pushes her to enlightenment. An agnostic, he also has a difficult relationship with his older sister Mary George, an Evangelical Protestant (Note: At one point, Asbury claims Mary George is an atheist, although he later recalls her taking him to a revival meeting.) school principal who never left the South and looks down on him for his snobbery and artistic failures. He fantasizes that other religious traditions (most notably Jesuit Catholicism) could have fulfilled his intellectual needs. Asbury's mother (Mrs. Fox) and Mary George are used to Asbury's complaints, and generally dismiss him as neurotic.

Asbury's physical decline is evident, and Mrs. Fox calls Dr. Block, a local physician. Asbury, who sees Timberboro as a backwater, treats the doctor with contempt. Dr. Block visits Asbury several times but is unable to diagnose him.

Asbury and his mother both reflect on Asbury's visit back home the year prior. Asbury was writing a play about blacks in the South and shadowed Mrs. Fox's black farmhands Randall and Morgan for research purposes. Mrs. Fox recalls that her son refused to endure hardships at work and did not make himself useful. Asbury recalls that he had hoped the farmhands would question authority. He tried to set an example for them by violating his mother's rules against drinking raw milk and smoking in the dairy. However, Asbury's contempt for his mother shocked Randall and Morgan.

As Asbury's condition declines further, he tells himself that art is his god and that death is art's reward for his faithful service. He senses an emotional or spiritual need within him, but does not know how to fill it. Mrs. Fox tries to cheer up her son by finding him an intellectual conversation partner. Asbury refuses to see the local Methodist minister and insists on seeing a Jesuit Catholic priest. However, the priest is not there for intellectual conversation. Assuming that Asbury was raised Catholic, he brusquely criticizes Asbury's lack of faith, calls him ignorant, and orders him to study the catechism. Asbury angrily declares that he has no need for the Holy Ghost. Hoping for one last real conversation, he asks to meet Randall and Morgan outside his mother's presence, which gravely offends his mother. However, he is unable to make conversation with them.

Dr. Block announces that Asbury will live: he has undulant fever, a chronic illness caused by a parasite. The doctor explains that Asbury can expect flare-ups to keep recurring, but the fever will not kill him. It turns out that Asbury gave himself the disease by drinking raw milk against his mother's instructions. Asbury is disappointed that he will not die a tragic death. He feels a chill and realizes that spiritual clarity has been imposed on him against his will, through the intercession of the Holy Ghost.

== Attempted sequel ==
O'Connor intended to continue Asbury's story in a sequel novel. She wrote that she was interested in writing about Asbury's "efforts to live with the Holy Ghost, which is a subject for a comic novel of no mean proportions", and specifically marked out Mary George as "a monster who ought to have a little comedown".

O'Connor ultimately adapted elements of "The Enduring Chill" for her third novel, Why Do the Heathen Rage?, which was unfinished at the time of her death and was published in fragmentary form in 2024. However, the novel's Asbury stand-in, Walter Tilman, "is a gently ironic, meditative creature, far removed from the nasty and petulant" Asbury of the short story.
