= The Violent Bear It Away =

1960 novel by Flannery O'Connor

- First edition
- Author: Flannery O'Connor
- Language: English
- Genre: Southern Gothic
- Publisher: Farrar, Straus and Giroux
- Publication date: 1960
- Publication place: United States
- Media type: Print
- Pages: 243
- OCLC: 170140

The Violent Bear It Away is a 1960 Southern Gothic novel by American author Flannery O'Connor. It is the second and final novel that she published. The first chapter was originally published as the story "You Can't Be Any Poorer Than Dead" in the journal New World Writing. The novel tells the story of Francis Marion Tarwater, a fourteen-year-old boy who is trying to escape the destiny his uncle has prescribed for him: the life of a prophet. Like most of O'Connor's stories, the novel is filled with Catholic themes and dark images, making it a classic example of Southern Gothic literature.

== Plot summary ==
Mason Tarwater, an outspoken evangelist and self-ordained prophet, dies many years after kidnapping his great-nephew Francis, raising him in a backwoods cabin and preparing him to someday take his place as a prophet. Prior to his death, Mason asked the now-teenaged Francis to give him a proper Christian burial with a cross marking the grave so that his body would be resurrected on Judgment Day. Francis starts to dig the grave but suddenly hears a "Voice" in his head telling him to forget about the old man. Francis obeys and gets drunk instead. When Francis wakes from his drunken sleep, he sets the cabin on fire, believing that his great-uncle's body is still inside. He leaves for the city and gets a ride from a salesman, who drops him off at his Uncle Rayber's house.

Rayber, a well-educated schoolteacher, is amazed to see young Francis, whom he had long ago given up on after his kidnapping by Mason. Francis is also greeted at the door by Rayber's young son Bishop, whom Rayber dismisses as "an idiot" (permanently disabled by low intelligence): "Five years old for all eternity, useless forever". Bishop is Rayber's child with Bernice Bishop, a meddlesome social worker whom Mason had referred to as "the welfare woman." The old man had previously told Francis that Bernice was much older than Rayber and only able to give him one disabled child, and that God had mercy on the child by making him "dim-witted," which was the only way to protect him from his evil parents. Mason had commissioned Francis to baptize Bishop at some point, in order to save the little boy's soul. Due to this history, Francis is immediately put on edge when confronted with Bishop, but decides to stay with his uncle anyway. Francis does not think of Bishop as a human being and finds him repulsive.

The three begin to live together as a family for a while, and Rayber is excited to have his nephew back in order to raise him as a normal boy and provide him with a proper education. However, Francis resists his uncle's attempts at secular reform very much the same way he resisted Mason's attempts at religious reform. Rayber understands what Francis is going through, as he himself had been kidnapped as a child by Mason, but Rayber's father had managed to rescue him.

After many attempts by Rayber to "civilize" the reluctant Francis, and many attempts by Francis to figure out his true destiny (either as a prophet, which was Mason's wish, or as an enlightened, educated modern man, which is his uncle Rayber's wish), Rayber devises a plan to take Francis back to the farm where he had been raised in the hope that confronting his past will allow him to leave it behind. Under the guise of taking the two boys out to a country lodge to go fishing, Rayber finally confronts Francis, telling him that he must accept an ordinary life and ignore the superstitious Christian upbringing and the false destiny with which his great-uncle has corrupted him. Francis, however, is not so easily convinced.

While at the lodge, Francis again hears the "Voice" (the devil) who tells him to forsake his great-uncle's command to baptize Bishop and to drown the boy instead. One evening, Francis takes Bishop out on a boat to the middle of the lake, with Rayber's reluctant blessing. Rayber cannot see them on the lake but can still hear their voices. Francis ends up drowning Bishop while at the same time baptizing the boy, thereby fulfilling both destinies simultaneously. Rayber realizes what has happened and faints, not out of fear for his son's life, but because he feels nothing at his son's death.

Francis runs away into the woods and tries to make his way back to Mason's house to confront his demons once and for all. He eventually hitches a ride with another man, who entices Francis to get drunk. Francis takes the man's offer and passes out, eventually waking up naked against a tree with his clothes neatly folded beside him. He dresses hurriedly and sets fire to the area.

Burning his way through the forest, Francis finally makes his way back to Powderhead, his great-uncle's old farm, where he finds the cabin has burned to the ground. Francis had assumed that his great-uncle had been burned up with it, but Buford, a Black man who lived nearby, had actually rescued Mason's body from the house while Francis was drunk at the beginning of the novel, and gave him a Christian burial as he had requested. Francis realizes that his great-uncle's two main requests (that he be given a proper burial and that Bishop be baptized) have been realized, which convinces him that he can no longer run away from his calling to be a prophet. The story ends with Francis heading toward the city to fulfill his calling to "Go warn the children of God of the terrible speed of mercy."

== Title ==
The novel's title is taken from a verse of the Douay Bible:

From the days of John the Baptist until now, the kingdom of heaven suffereth violence, and the violent bear it away.

— Matthew 11:12

There are various explanations of the meaning of this verse. The most accepted explanation is that violence constantly attacks God and heaven and that only those who are "violent with the love of God" can bear heaven away. This is seen when Tarwater drowns Bishop. He commits a violent act, but the "accidental" baptism is a powerful act of violent love for God—which bears away the crime of murder.

Another possible meaning is that both secularism and fundamentalism (that is, the Protestant functioning outside of the Roman Catholic Church) are heresy, which blinds their adherents to God's truth. When God's grace comes into contact with an errant life, a violent revelation occurs. Falsehood and heresy are burned off, and the sinner then sees the truth clearly. Those who suffer this spiritual violence bear the kingdom of God with them as they go through the world.

== Characters ==
- Francis Marion Tarwater: The protagonist of the story. Kidnapped by his great-uncle at a young age, he has been raised under the single-minded premise that his destiny is to become a prophet. At first greatly frustrated by the notion of being forced to subscribe to a pre-ordained fate, he vows to do anything he can to prevent it from happening. Francis does not fit the role of a hero, strictly speaking, but is the central figure in the novel.
- Rayber: The main antagonist of the story. He is a staunchly anti-religious schoolteacher and lives a secular lifestyle. He is the uncle of Tarwater and the father of Bishop. He tries to protect Tarwater and Bishop from baptism and the old man's corrupting influence, but ultimately fails.
- Bishop: An intellectually disabled child who is the son of Rayber and the cousin of Tarwater. Tarwater was raised with the belief that it is his destiny to baptize Bishop, whereas Rayber struggles to prevent this from happening.
- Mason Tarwater: The great-uncle of Tarwater and Bishop and the uncle of Rayber. A fanatically religious self-ordained prophet, he raised Tarwater to follow in his footsteps. His death at the beginning of the novel spurs Tarwater's quest of denial and redemptions.
- The "friend": A voice in Tarwater's head representing rational, secular thinking, which he has been trained throughout his childhood to ignore. In her letters, O'Connor confirmed that this "friend" is Satan himself.

== Major themes ==
Flannery O'Connor was a devout Catholic, and The Violent Bear It Away reflects her religious beliefs. It is filled with religious imagery and themes, ranging from the power of passion to the dominance of destiny.

The most obvious of the novel's themes is the idea that destiny and religion will dominate over the secular. O'Connor illustrates this well, demonstrating the power of Tarwater's destiny as it dominates every obstacle in its way; the drowning of Bishop is transformed to a baptism, Tarwater's rape turns to revelation, and the secular Rayber fails in every way. The importance of passion is also linked with the power of religion. Tarwater is filled with passion; Rayber suppresses his. Thus, Tarwater succeeds and is redeemed, and Rayber is ultimately destroyed. This is shown when Bishop is killed; when he realizes that he has no love for his son, Rayber collapses.

The idea that everything that destroys also creates is evident as well. Nearly every symbol and character in the book pulls Tarwater away from his destiny but also pushes him back. Rayber nearly succeeds in secularizing Tarwater, but he ultimately brings the boy back to Powderhead. The drowning of Bishop, the ultimate secular act, nearly destroys Tarwater's destiny, but the simultaneous baptism redeems it. Fire both destroys Powderhead and burns Tarwater's eyes clean. Water both drowns and baptizes. Everything that destroys, redeems.

James Cantrell argues that O'Connor's Irish heritage is central to the novel, serving as the foundation of her exploration of the conflicts between Christianity and secularism in America. He says, for example, that the surname "Tarwater" is completely understood only in the context of Irish culture and history.
