= The Sewanee Review =

American literary magazine

- The cover of the Summer 2004 edition. The cover design remained unchanged from 1944 to 2016.
- Discipline: Literature
- Language: English
- Edited by: Adam Ross

Publication details
- History: 1892–present
- Publisher: Johns Hopkins University Press for Sewanee: The University of the South (United States)
- Frequency: Quarterly

Standard abbreviations
- ISO 4: Sewanee Rev.

Indexing
- ISSN: 0037-3052 (print); 1934-421X (web)
- JSTOR: 00373052
- OCLC no.: 1936968

Links
- Journal homepage; Online access; The Sewanee Review at JHU Press

The Sewanee Review is an American literary magazine established in 1892. It is the oldest continuously published quarterly in the United States. It publishes original fiction and poetry, essays, reviews, and literary criticism.

== History ==
The Sewanee Review was established in 1892 by William Peterfield Trent as a magazine "devoted to reviews of leading books and to papers on such topics of general Theology, Philosophy, History, Political Science, and Literature as require further treatment than they receive in specialist publications." Telfair Hodgson took on the financial risks for the venture. As its managing editor, he handled advertising and accounting, freeing Trent to concentrate on the magazine's literary content. Trent remained editor-in-chief of the review until 1900.

After a number of short-term editors, George Herbert Clarke took over in 1920. Clarke was the first editor to publish poetry. Clarke remained editor until 1926 and was succeeded by William S. Knickerbocker, who published the first piece of fiction in the magazine.

In 1942, Tudor Seymour Long became editor, with Andrew Nelson Lytle serving as managing editor and Allen Tate as an advisory editor and de facto editor until 1944. In 1944, when Tate took over as editor, he and Lytle revolutionized the magazine's place in American letters. It focused on New Criticism, alongside Cleanth Brooks's Southern Review and John Crowe Ransom's The Kenyon Review. Tate also had the magazine redesigned by P. J. Conkwright, who crafted the distinctive blue cover and design.

When Tate's editorship ended in 1946, John E. Palmer became editor. He was followed by Monroe K. Spears in 1952 and then Andrew Lytle again in 1965. George Core succeeded Lytle in 1973. After 43 years as editor, Core retired in 2016, and the novelist Adam Ross was appointed to succeed him. Early in Ross's tenure, the cover was redesigned by graphic artists Oliver Munday and Peter Mendelsund, the associate art director at Alfred A. Knopf. This marked the magazine's first new cover in over 70 years.

== Aiken Taylor Award for Modern American Poetry ==
The Review gives the annual Aiken Taylor Award, a prize of $10,000, which begin in 1985 by the physician and poet K. P. A. Taylor in honor of his brother Conrad Aiken. Winners of the award, which has often been given to poets otherwise unaffiliated with the Review, have included Howard Nemerov, Richard Wilbur, Anthony Hecht, W. S. Merwin, Gwendolyn Brooks, Wendell Berry, Maxine Kumin, Carolyn Kizer, X. J. Kennedy, Eleanor Ross Taylor, Grace Schulman, Henry S. Taylor, B. H. Fairchild, Anne Stevenson, Donald Hall, Louise Glück, Billy Collins, Christian Wiman, Mary Ruefle, Heather McHugh, and Carl Phillips.

== See also ==
- List of literary magazines
