= Flannery O'Connor =

American writer (1925–1964)

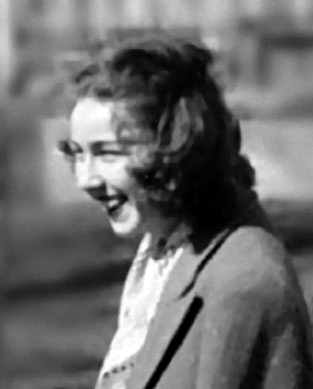
- O'Connor in 1947
- Born: Mary Flannery O'Connor; March 25, 1925; Savannah, Georgia, US
- Died: August 3, 1964 (aged 39); Milledgeville, Georgia, US
- Resting place: Memory Hill Cemetery, Milledgeville, Georgia
- Occupations: Novelist; short story writer; essayist
- Writing career
- Period: 1946–1964
- Genre: Southern Gothic
- Subjects: Morality; Catholicism; grace; transcendence
- Notable works: Wise Blood; The Violent Bear It Away; A Good Man Is Hard to Find
- Movement: Christian realism

Mary Flannery O'Connor (March 25, 1925 – August 3, 1964) was an American novelist, short story writer, and essayist. She wrote two novels and 31 short stories, as well as a number of reviews and commentaries.

O'Connor was a Southern writer who often wrote in a sardonic Southern Gothic style. She relied heavily on regional settings and grotesque characters, often in violent situations. In her writing, an unsentimental acceptance or rejection of the limitations, imperfections or differences of these characters (whether attributed to disability, race, crime, religion, or sanity) typically underpins the drama.

O'Connor's writing often reflects her Catholic faith, and frequently examines questions of morality and ethics. In her own words, "[a]ll my stories are about the action of grace on a character who is not very willing to support it, but most people think of these stories as hard, hopeless, brutal, etc." Her posthumously compiled Complete Stories won the 1972 U.S. National Book Award for Fiction and has been the subject of enduring praise.

== Early life and education ==
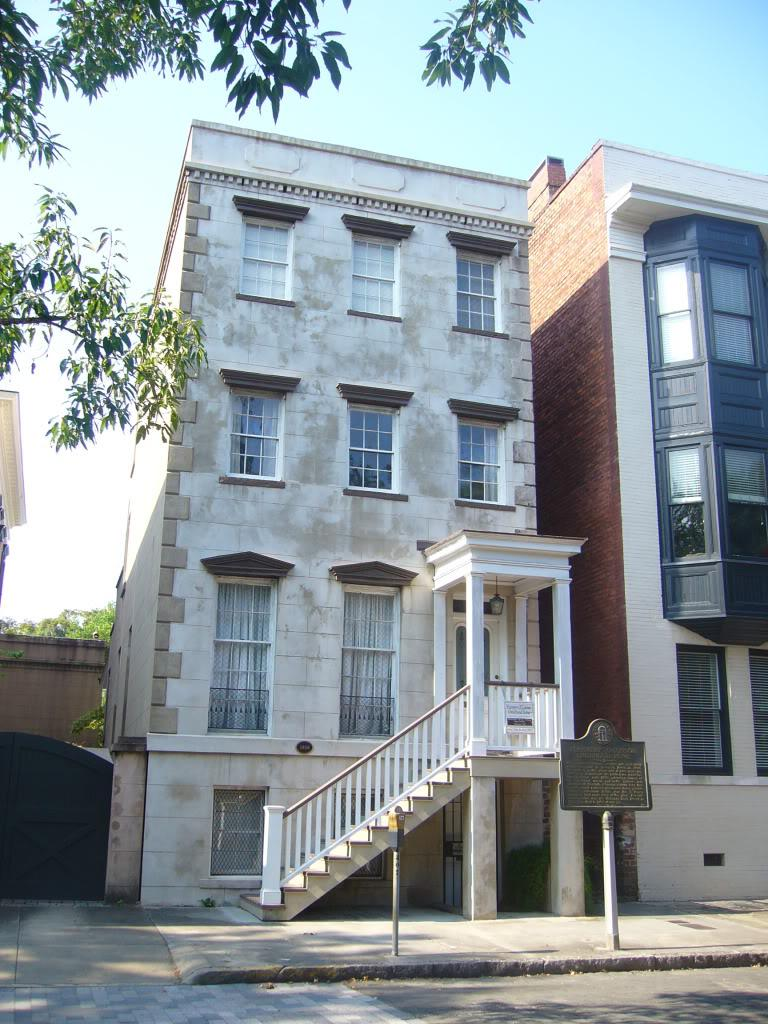
O'Connor's childhood home in Savannah, Georgia

=== Childhood ===
O'Connor was born on March 25, 1925, in Savannah, Georgia, the only child of Edward Francis O'Connor, a real estate agent, and Regina Cline, both of Irish descent. As an adult, she remembered herself as a "pigeon-toed child with a receding chin and a you-leave-me-alone-or-I'll-bite-you complex". The Flannery O'Connor Childhood Home museum is located at 207 E. Charlton Street on Lafayette Square.

In 1940, O'Connor and her family moved to Milledgeville, Georgia, where they initially lived with her mother's family at the so-called 'Cline Mansion,' in town. In 1937, her father was diagnosed with systemic lupus erythematosus, which led to his eventual death on February 1, 1941. O'Connor and her mother continued to live in Milledgeville. In 1951, they moved to Andalusia Farm, which is now a museum dedicated to O'Connor's work.

=== Schooling ===
O'Connor attended Peabody High School, where she worked as the school newspaper's art editor and from which she graduated in 1942. She entered Georgia State College for Women (now Georgia College & State University) in an accelerated three-year program and graduated in June 1945 with a B.A. in sociology and English literature. While at Georgia College, she produced a significant amount of cartoon work for the student newspaper. Many critics have claimed that the idiosyncratic style and approach of these early cartoons shaped her later fiction in important ways.

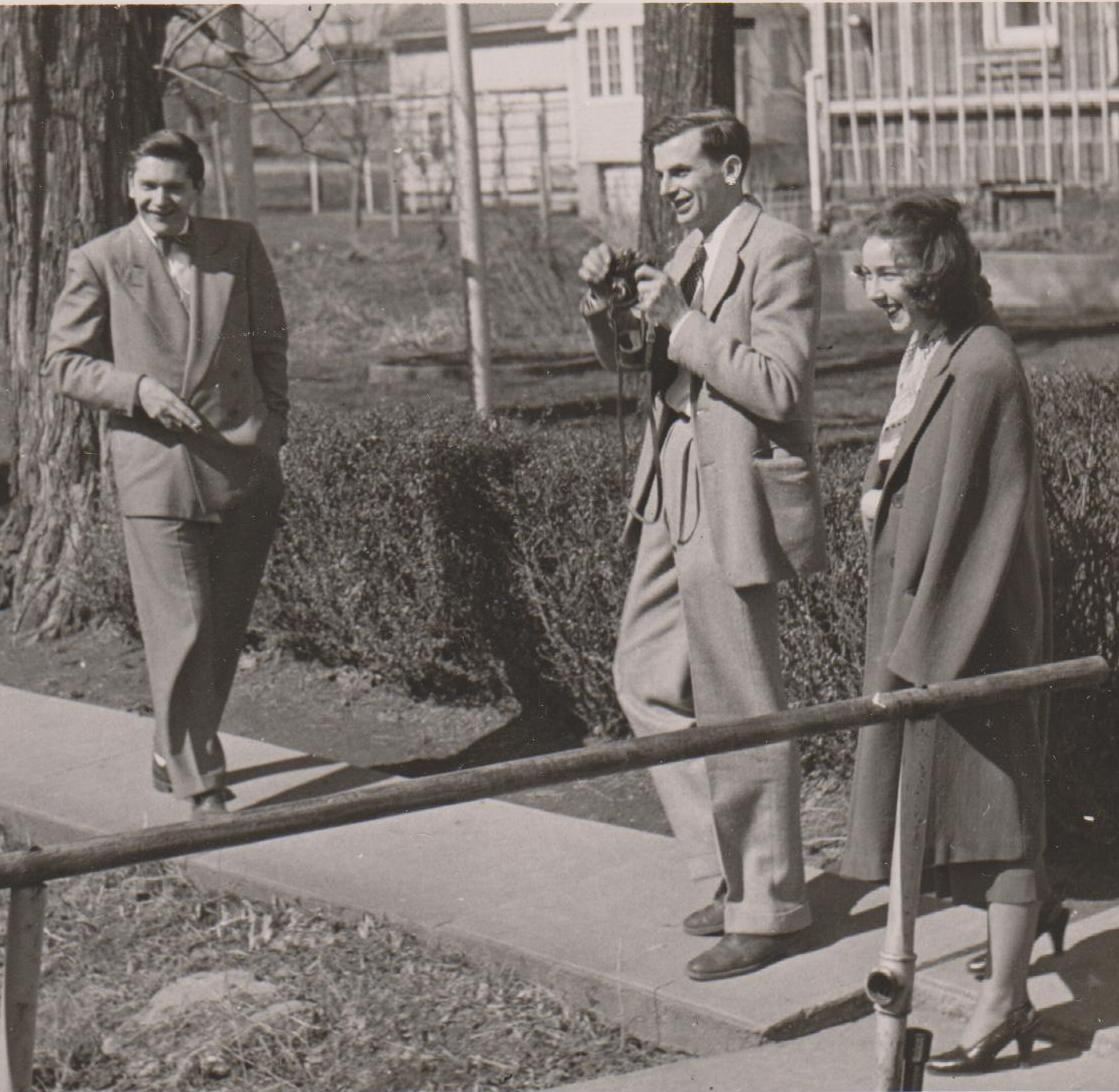
O'Connor with Arthur Koestler (left) and Robie Macauley on a visit to the Amana Colonies in 1947

In 1945, she was accepted into the prestigious Iowa Writers' Workshop at the University of Iowa, where she went, at first, to study journalism. While there, she got to know several important writers and critics who lectured or taught in the program, among them Robert Penn Warren, John Crowe Ransom, Robie Macauley, Austin Warren and Andrew Lytle. Lytle, for many years editor of the Sewanee Review, was one of the earliest admirers of her fiction. He later published several of her stories in the Sewanee Review, as well as critical essays on her work. Workshop director Paul Engle was the first to read and comment on the initial drafts of what would become Wise Blood. She received an M.F.A. from the University of Iowa in 1947. After completing her degree, she remained at the Iowa Writers' Workshop for another year on a fellowship. During her time at the Iowa Writers' Workshop, she dropped the name Mary, which gave her the impression of an "Irish washwoman", and became Flannery O'Connor. During the summer of 1948, O'Connor continued to work on Wise Blood at Yaddo, an artists' community in Saratoga Springs, New York, where she also completed several short stories.

In 1949, O'Connor met and eventually accepted an invitation to stay with Robert Fitzgerald (a well-known translator of the classics) and his wife, Sally, in Ridgefield, Connecticut.

== Career ==
O'Connor is primarily known for her short stories. She published two books of short stories: A Good Man Is Hard to Find (1955) and Everything That Rises Must Converge (published posthumously in 1965). Many of O'Connor's short stories have been re-published in major anthologies, including The Best American Short Stories and Prize Stories.

O'Connor's two novels are Wise Blood (1952) (made into a film by John Huston) and The Violent Bear It Away (1960).

Fragments exist of an unfinished O'Connor novel tentatively entitled Why Do the Heathen Rage? The unfinished novel draws from several of her short stories, including "Why Do the Heathen Rage?", "The Enduring Chill", and "The Partridge Festival".

From 1956 through 1964, she wrote more than one hundred book reviews for two Catholic diocesan newspapers in Georgia: The Bulletin and The Southern Cross. According to fellow reviewer Joey Zuber, the wide range of books she chose to review demonstrated that she was profoundly intellectual. Her reviews consistently confronted theological and ethical themes in books written by the most serious and demanding theologians of her time. Professor of English Carter Martin, an authority on O'Connor's writings, notes simply that her "book reviews are at one with her religious life".

=== Characteristics ===
Regarding her emphasis of the grotesque, O'Connor said: "[A]nything that comes out of the South is going to be called grotesque by the northern reader, unless it is grotesque, in which case, it is going to be called realistic." Her fiction is usually set in the South and features morally flawed protagonists who frequently interact with characters with disabilities or are disabled themselves (as O'Connor was by lupus). The issue of race often appears. Most of her works feature disturbing elements, although she did not like to be characterized as cynical. "I am mighty tired of reading reviews that call A Good Man brutal and sarcastic", she wrote. "The stories are hard, but they are hard, because there is nothing harder or less sentimental than Christian realism. When I see these stories described as horror stories, I am always amused, because the reviewer always has hold of the wrong horror."

She felt deeply informed by the sacramental and by the Thomist notion that the created world is charged with God. For her, God was a given of experience, not a mere intuition of the mind or spirit. When Mary McCarthy told her that she considered the Eucharist only a "symbol, and a pretty good one", O'Connor completely disagreed, saying: "Well, if it's a symbol, to hell with it". Yet, she did not write apologetic fiction of the kind prevalent in the Catholic literature of the time, explaining that a writer's meaning must be evident, in his or her fiction, without didacticism. She wrote ironic, subtly allegorical fiction about deceptively backward Southern characters, usually fundamentalist Protestants, who undergo transformations of character that, to her thinking, brought them closer to the Catholic mind. The transformation is often accomplished through pain, violence, and ludicrous behavior in the pursuit of the holy. However grotesque the setting, she tried to portray her characters as open to the touch of divine grace. This ruled out a sentimental understanding of the stories' violence, as of her own illness. She wrote: "Grace changes us, and the change is painful."

She had a deeply sardonic sense of humor, often based on the disparity between her characters' limited perceptions and the extraordinary fate awaiting them. Another frequent source of humor is the attempt of well-meaning liberals to cope with the rural South on their own terms. O'Connor used such characters' inability to come to terms with disability, race, poverty, and fundamentalism, other than in sentimental illusions, to illustrate her view that the secular world was failing in the twentieth century.

In several stories, O'Connor explored a number of contemporary issues from the perspective of both her fundamentalist and liberal characters. She addressed the Holocaust in her story "The Displaced Person", racial integration in "Everything That Rises Must Converge", and intersexuality, in "A Temple of the Holy Ghost". Her fiction often included references to the problem of race in the South. Occasionally, racial issues come to the forefront, as in "The Artificial Nigger", "Everything that Rises Must Converge", and "Judgement Day" (her last short story, which was a drastically rewritten version of her first published story, "The Geranium").

Despite her secluded life, her writing reveals an uncanny grasp of the nuances of human behavior. O'Connor gave many lectures on faith and literature, traveling quite far despite her frail health. Politically, she maintained a broadly progressive outlook in connection with her faith; she voted for John F. Kennedy in 1960 and outwardly supported the work of Martin Luther King Jr. and the civil rights movement. Despite this, she made her personal stance on race and integration known throughout her life in several letters to playwright Maryat Lee (which she wrote under the pseudonym "Mrs Turpin"). In one such letter, she said, "You know, I'm an integrationist, by principle, and a segregationist, by taste. I don't like negroes. They all give me a pain, and the more of them I see, the less and less I like them. Particularly the new kind". According to O'Connor biographer, Brad Gooch, there are also "letters where she even talks about a friend that she makes in graduate school at the University of Iowa who is black, and she defends this friendship to her own mother, in letters. It's complicated to look at, and I don't think that we can box her in".

=== Letters ===
Throughout her life, O'Connor maintained a wide correspondence with writers that included Robert Lowell and Elizabeth Bishop, English professor Samuel Ashley Brown, Catholic nun and literary critic M. Bernetta Quinn, and playwright Maryat Lee. After her death, a selection of her letters, edited by her friend Sally Fitzgerald, was published as The Habit of Being.

In 1955, Betty Hester, an Atlanta file clerk, wrote O'Connor a letter, expressing admiration for her work. Hester's letter drew O'Connor's attention, and they corresponded frequently. For The Habit of Being, Hester provided Fitzgerald with all the letters she received from O'Connor but requested that her identity be kept private. She was identified only as "A." The complete collection of the unedited letters between O'Connor and Hester was unveiled by Emory University in May 2007. The letters had been given to the university in 1987 with the stipulation that they not be released to the public for 20 years.

Emory University's collection also contains the more than 600 letters O'Connor wrote to her mother, Regina. O'Connor wrote to her mother nearly every day while she was pursuing her literary career in Iowa City, New York, and Massachusetts. Some of her letters describe "travel itineraries and plumbing mishaps, ripped stockings and roommates with loud radios", as well as her request for the homemade mayonnaise of her childhood.

== Visual arts ==
O'Connor was an avid cartoonist and painter, "I don't know how to write", she once said. "But I can draw." In 2023, two barrels full of paintings on wood tile by O'Connor were discovered. It was thought they were hidden by her trustees who were worried it would distract from her fame as a writer.

== Personal life ==
=== Catholicism ===
O'Connor was a devout Catholic. A prayer journal O'Connor had kept during her time at the University of Iowa was published in 2013. It included prayers and ruminations on faith, writing, and O'Connor's relationship with God. O'Connor was an avid reader of Christian existentialist philosophers such as Gabriel Marcel, considering herself "a Catholic peculiarly possessed of the modern consciousness", and thinking that the South was "Christ-haunted".

=== Interest in birds ===
O'Connor frequently used bird imagery within her fiction.

O'Connor kept chickens and canaries at her childhood home in Savannah. When she was six, O'Connor experienced her first brush with celebrity status. Pathé News filmed "Little Mary O'Connor" with O'Connor and her trained chicken and showed the film around the country. She said: "When I was six I had a chicken that walked backward and was in the Pathé News. I was in it too with the chicken. I was just there to assist the chicken but it was the high point in my life. Everything since has been an anticlimax." According to writer and critic Catherine Taylor, the "determined chicken, walking backwards to go forward, is a tempting metaphor for O'Connor's own endurance. It instilled in her a 'love affair' with birds that seemed to transcend most human interactions".

In high school, when the girls were required to sew Sunday dresses for themselves, O'Connor sewed a full outfit of underwear and clothes to fit her pet duck and brought the duck to school to model it.

As an adult at Andalusia, she raised and nurtured some 100 peafowl. Fascinated by birds of all kinds, she raised ducks, ostriches, emus, toucans, and any sort of exotic bird she could obtain, while incorporating peacock imagery in her writing. She described her peacocks in an essay titled "The King of the Birds". O'Connor often used peacocks as symbolism in her writing. The birds are thought to represent divine beauty and mystery, connecting to her spirituality and belief in living reminders of the unexpected, mysterious ways grace appears in the world.

=== Illness and death ===
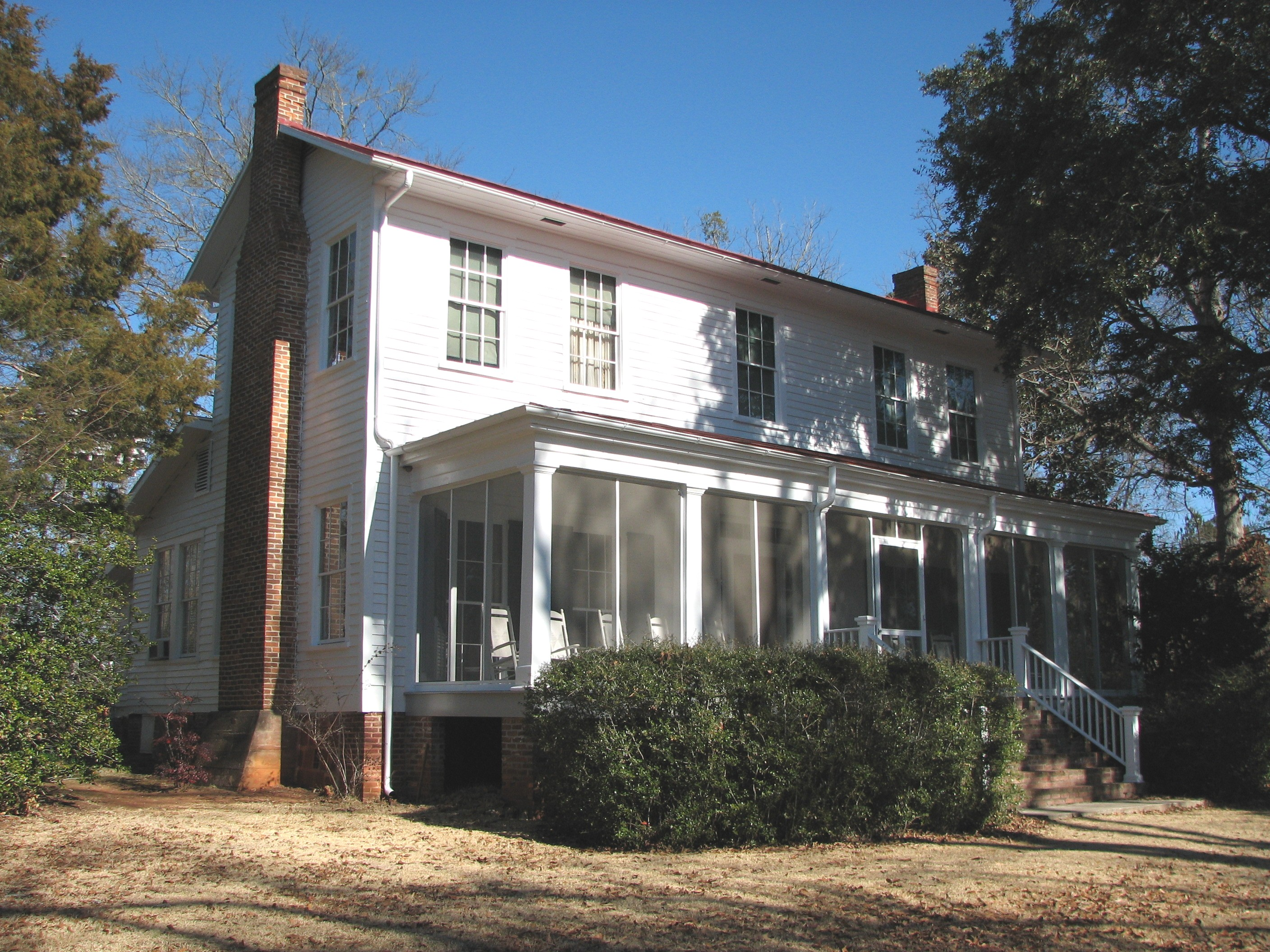
Andalusia Farm, where O'Connor lived from 1952 until her 1964 death

By the summer of 1952, O'Connor was diagnosed with systemic lupus erythematosus (lupus), as her father had been before her. She remained at Andalusia for the rest of her life. O'Connor lived for twelve years after her diagnosis, which was seven years longer than expected. Her daily routine was to attend Mass, write in the morning, then, spend the rest of the day recuperating and reading. Despite the debilitating effects of the steroid drugs used to treat O'Connor's lupus, she nonetheless made over sixty appearances at lectures to read her works. In the PBS documentary Flannery, the writer Alice McDermott explains the impact lupus had on O'Connor's work, saying, "It was the illness, I think, which made her the writer she is".

O'Connor completed more than two dozen short stories and two novels while living with lupus. "The wolf, I'm afraid, is inside tearing up the place", she wrote to her friend Sister Mariella Gable just a few weeks before her death. She died on August 3, 1964, at the age of 39 in Baldwin County Hospital. Her death was caused by complications from a new attack of lupus, following surgery for a uterine fibroid. She is buried in Milledgeville, Georgia, at Memory Hill Cemetery.

== Legacy, awards, and tributes ==
O'Connor's Complete Stories won the 1972 U.S. National Book Award for Fiction and, in a 2009 online poll, was named the best book ever to have won the National Book Awards.

In June 2015, the United States Postal Service honored O'Connor with a new postage stamp, the 30th issuance in the Literary Arts series. Some criticized the stamp as failing to reflect O'Connor's character and legacy.

The Flannery O'Connor Award for Short Fiction, named in honor of O'Connor by the University of Georgia Press, is a prize given annually since 1983 to an outstanding collection of short stories.

The Flannery O'Connor Book Trail is a series of Little Free Libraries stretching between O'Connor's homes in Savannah and Milledgeville.

The Flannery O'Connor Childhood Home is a historic house museum in Savannah, Georgia, where O'Connor lived during her childhood. In addition to serving as a museum, the house hosts regular events and programs.

Loyola University Maryland had a student dormitory named for O'Connor. In 2020, Flannery O'Connor Hall was renamed in honor of activist Sister Thea Bowman. The announcement also mentions, "This renaming comes after recent recognition of Flannery O'Connor, a 20th century Catholic American writer, and the racism present in some of her work."

The Flannery List, named after O'Connor, is a curated list of musicals and plays that ""deal in an interesting way with faith, religion, and/or spirituality."

The film, Flannery: The Storied Life of the Writer from Georgia, has been described as the story of a writer "who wrestled with the greater mysteries of existence."

In 2023, the biographical film Wildcat was released. Co-written and directed by Ethan Hawke and starring his daughter, Maya Hawke, as Flannery O'Connor, the film features a dramatization of O'Connor trying to publish Wise Blood, interspersed with scenes from her short fiction. O'Connor scholar Bruce Gentry said that the film "has five hundred factual errors."

In May 2023, about two dozen small paintings O'Connor had done in her youth were found in the attic of the 200-year-old Milledgeville mansion where she had lived between the ages of eight and twenty-one. In March 2025, they were displayed at Georgia College & State University.

In 2024, O'Connor's unfinished novel Why Do the Heathen Rage? was published by Brazos Press. Jessica Hooten Wilson assembled scenes from O'Connor's drafts and supplied her own critical commentary.

== Works ==
=== Novels ===
- Wise Blood (1952)
- The Violent Bear It Away (1960)
- Why Do the Heathen Rage? (unfinished; published 2024)

=== Short story collections ===
- A Good Man Is Hard to Find and Other Stories (1955)
- Everything That Rises Must Converge (1965)
- The Complete Stories (1971)

=== Other works ===
- Mystery and Manners: Occasional Prose (1969)
- The Habit of Being: Letters of Flannery O'Connor (1979)
- The Presence of Grace: and Other Book Reviews (1983)
- Flannery O'Connor: Collected Works (1988)
- Flannery O'Connor: The Cartoons (2012)
- A Prayer Journal (2013)

== See also ==
- Southern United States literature
