= The Old Forest and Other Stories =

- First edition
- Author: Peter Taylor
- Genre: Short story collection
- Publisher: The Dial Press
- Publication date: 1985
- Media type: Print (hardback)
- Pages: 358
- ISBN: 978-0701139674

The Old Forest and Other Stories is a collection of short stories by Peter Taylor published in 1985 by The Dial Press.

The collection received the 1986 PEN/Faulkner Award for the best volume of short stories. The title story was an O. Henry Award winner and was included in The Best American Short Stories 1980.

== Stories ==
The Old Forest and Other Stories comprises four stories from each of Taylor's earliest collections: A Long Fourth and Other Stories (1948), The Widows of Thornton (1954), and Happy Families Are All Alike (1959). In addition, two new stories never before collected are also included: "The Old Forest" and "The Gift of the Prodigal".

The original dates of publication and periodicals are indicated below.

- "The Gift of the Prodigal" (The New Yorker, June 1, 1981)
- "The Old Forest" (The New Yorker, May 14, 1979)
- "Promise of Rain" (The New Yorker, January 25, 1958, as "The Unforgivable")
- "Bad Dreams" (The New Yorker, May 19, 1951)
- "A Friend and Protector" (The Kenyon Review, Summer 1959, as "Who Was Jesse's Friend and Protector")
- "A Walled Garden" (New Republic, December 1941
- "Alligiance" (The Kenyon Review, Spring 1947)
- "The Little Cousins" (The New Yorker, April 25, 1959, as "Cousins, Family Love, Family Life, All That")
- "A Long Fourth" (Sewanee Review, Summer 1946)
- "Rain in the Heart" (Sewanee Review, Winter 1945)
- "Porte-Cochere" (The New Yorker, July 16, 1949)
- "The Scoutmaster" (Partisan Review, Summer 1945, as "The Scout Master")
- "Two Ladies in Retirement" (The New Yorker, March 31, 1951)
- "The Death of a Kinsman: A Play" (Sewanee Review, Winter 1949)

== Reception ==
New York Times critic Robert Towers compares Taylor's "exactitude of observation " favorably to his modernist contemporaries John O'Hara and John Cheever. Towers adds:

[P]eter Taylor's best stories are like miniature novels...His narrative method is to hover over the action, to digress from it, to explore byways and relationships, to speculate on alternative possibilities—in short, to defy the conventions of brevity and concentration that we usually associate with the genre.

== Sources ==
- Robinson, James Curry. 1988. Peter Taylor: A Study of the Short Fiction. Twanyes Publishers, Boston. G. K. Hall & Co., Gordon Weaver, General Editor. ISBN 0-8057-8303-2
- Towers, Robert. 1985. "A Master of the Miniature Novel". New York Times, February 17, 1985. Accessed 14 April, 2026.
- Taylor, Peter. 1985. The Old Forest and Other Stories. The Dial Press, Doubleday & Company, New York. ISBN 978-0701139674.
