= C. Cameron Macauley =

American photographer

Charles Cameron Macauley
- Born: October 20, 1923; Grand Rapids, Michigan
- Died: May 17, 2007 (aged 83); El Cerrito, California
- Education: University of Wisconsin, MFA (Creative Photography), 1958
- Known for: Photography
- Notable work: Baboon Ecology (1962); Baboon Social Organization (1963)
- Awards: American Indian Film Festival Blue Ribbon Award; Columbus International Film & Video Festival Award; Chris Award; Berlin International Film Festival Award
- Patrons: Minor White

Charles Cameron Macauley (October 20, 1923 – May 17, 2007) was a photographer, filmmaker and educator noted for his prize winning still photographs, his ethnographic films and his expertise on historic films and photographs. His career spanned over 75 years.

== Biography ==
=== Early life ===
Charles Cameron Macauley was born on October 20, 1923, in Grand Rapids, Michigan. He was the younger brother of the noted editor and novelist Robie Macauley. Both boys took an interest in photography, and at the age of ten Macauley purchased his first Norton camera, a prototype of the highly successful Univex Model A, which sold for 39 cents and was among the first inexpensive cameras marketed for the general public.

Macauley also experimented with a folding Kodak Bantam camera, a Foth Derby, a Rolleicord I, an Argus, a National Graflex and a Miniature Speed Graphic with a soft focus Verito lens.

By the late 1930s Macauley began doing commercial photography using a 4x5 Speed Graphic. He was briefly employed as a photographer and a photoengraver for The Ottawa Times.

Macauley entered Kenyon College in Gambier, Ohio in 1942 and in December hitchhiked to New York City to meet Alfred Stieglitz. Although Stieglitz refused to comment on Macauley's photographs, he permitted the young man to photograph him reclining on a couch.

=== War years ===
Macauley returned to Kenyon and enlisted in the Navy in 1943. He completed a 4-month course at the U.S. Naval Photographic School at NAS Pensacola, Florida and then a graduate course in photolithography at the Naval Photographic Science Laboratory in Anacostia, Washington, D.C. He was assigned to a Photographic Squadron which made mosaic maps of all coastlines in the Western Hemisphere including Greenland. During the war Macauley completed courses in photogrammetry, operational mapping, and hydrography. He later served on board the USS Tangier in the South China Sea.

=== Education ===
Macauley returned to Kenyon College in 1946 and graduated in 1949 with a B.A. in English. As a student during the summer of 1947, accredited as a foreign correspondent, he traveled through Central America and photographed the events of Costa Rican Civil War. He went on to study at the California School of Fine Arts (now the San Francisco Art Institute) under Minor White. He was employed as an instructor at the University of Wisconsin from 1952 to 1957 and completed his MFA in Creative Photography there in 1958. During this period he worked with Dorothea Lange, Ansel Adams, Man Ray, Imogen Cunningham, Lisette Model, Edward Weston and Edward Steichen.

== Career ==
Macauley became interested in anthropological, primatological, archeological and ethnographic films and from 1956 to 1964 was involved with William Heick in the American Indian Film Project, a project to document Native American cultures through film and sound recordings. Macauley worked closely with Alfred Kroeber and Samuel Barrett, writing scripts, filming and recording, and editing many of the 105 films produced during the project, using 16mm color Ektachrome footage.

He later produced several films on primate behavior with primatologists George B. Schaller, Sherwood Washburn and Irven DeVore.

During this period Macauley taught photography at the University of California at Berkeley and at UCSF and became director of the university's media distribution center for the 9 campuses.

In 1983 he stepped down from this position to found his own media appraisal group, Media Appraisal Consultants. In 1996 he was contracted by the JFK Presidential Library to appraise a series of documentary films which Ernest Hemingway co-produced, narrated and appeared in.

In 1997 Macauley was appointed by the United States Department of Justice to appraise the Zapruder film of the assassination of President John F. Kennedy. Macauley and other film experts contracted by the US Government assessed the film's value at $784,065. Following arbitration with the Zapruder heirs, the government purchased the film in 1998 for $16 million.

During his career Macauley participated as an awards juror in 85 national and international film festivals and was scriptwriter/cinematographer for 33 films, producer/director of 8 films, and production manager or film animator for 9 films.

He died in California on May 17, 2007.

== Photographic works ==
Macauley's photographic skill was first recognized for a series of black and white stills taken in San Francisco in the early 1950s.

During the 1940s Macauley took photographs of Ansel Adams, William Empson, Anthony Hecht, Arthur Koestler, Dorothea Lange, Robert Lowell, Flannery O'Connor, Mamaine Paget, John Crowe Ransom, Peter Taylor, Eleanor Ross Taylor, Dody Weston Thompson, Brett Weston, and Edward Weston. He is also known for a series of portraits he produced mostly in the 1950s, including photographs of Jack Benny, Aldous Huxley, Frank Lloyd Wright, Count Basie, Buster Keaton and John Houseman.

Minor White considered Macauley's images "sensitive" and "lyrical" and noted that he could "work with people with considerable insight and power."

== Awards ==
Macauley received the American Indian Film Festival Blue Ribbon Award, the Columbus International Film & Video Festival Chris Award and the Berlin International Film Festival Award.
