= The Collected Stories of Peter Taylor =

Collection of short stories by Peter Taylor

- First edition
- Author: Peter Taylor
- Publisher: Farrar, Straus, and Giroux
- Publication date: 1969
- Media type: Print (hardback)
- Pages: 535

The Collected Stories of Peter Taylor is a collection of short stories by Peter Taylor published in 1969 by Farrar, Straus, and Giroux. The collection was reissued in paperback in 2009.

The twenty-one stories in this volume include fourteen selections from Taylor's four previous collections: A Long Fourth and Other Stories (1948), The Widow of Thornton (1954), Happy Families Are All Alike (1959), and Miss Leonora When Last Seen (1963). In addition, five uncollected works are included which first appeared in periodicals.

== Stories ==
The original dates of publication and periodicals are indicated.

Introduction by Richard Bausch

- "Dean of Men" (Virginia Quarterly Review, Spring 1969)
- "First Heat" (Shenandoah, Winter 1968)
- "Reservations: A Love Story" (The New Yorker, February 25, 1961)
- "The Other Times" (The New Yorker, February 23, 1957)
- "At the Drugstore" (Sewanee Review, Autumn 1962)
- "A Spinster's Tale" (Southern Review, Autumn 1940)
- "The Fancy Woman" (Southern Review, Summer 1941)
- "Their Losses" (The New Yorker, March 11, 1950)
- Two Pilgrims" (The New Yorker, September 7, 1963)
- "What You Hear From 'Em? (The New Yorker, February 10, 1951)
- "A Wife of Nashville" (The New Yorker, December 3, 1949)
- "Cookie" (The New Yorker, November 1948, as "Middle Age")
- "Venus, Cupid, Folly and Time" (The Kenyon Review, Spring 1958)
- "1939" (The New Yorker, March 12, 1955, as "A Sentimental Journey")
- "There" (The Kenyon Review, Winter 1964)
- "The Elect" (McCall's, April 1968)
- "Guests" (The New Yorker, October 3, 1959)
- "Heads of Houses" (The New Yorker, September 12, 1959)
- "Mrs. Billingsby's Wine" (The New Yorker, October 14, 1967)
- "Je Suis Perdu" (The New Yorker, June 7, 1958, as "A Pair of Bright Blue Eyes")
- "Miss Leonora When Last Seen" (The New Yorker, November 19, 1960)

== Reception ==
Declaring Peter Taylor "one of the best writers America has ever produced," New York Times reviewer Richard Howard contrasts Taylor's writing with that of some his contemporaries:

Affable, persuasive, never glossy, never hurrying, steadily gaining ground, these narratives are not glamorous, or side-splitting, or desperate (they are not like the stories of Jean Stafford, or Eudora Welty, or Flannery O'Connor)...

== Sources ==
- Howard, Richard. "The Collected Stories of Peter Taylor." The New York Times, October 19, 1969. Accessed April, 15, 2026.
- Robison, James Curry. 1988. Peter Taylor: A Study of the Short Fiction. Twanye Publishers, Boston. G. K. Hall & Co., Gordon Weaver, General Editor. ISBN 0-8057-8303-2
