= Heather Ross Miller =

American writer (1939–2025)

- Born: September 15, 1939 Albemarle, North Carolina, U.S.
- Died: July 9, 2025 (aged 85)
- Occupation: Writer
- Education: University of North Carolina at Greensboro (MFA)
- Relatives: Eleanor Ross Taylor (aunt); Peter Taylor; Donald Justice

Heather Ross Miller (September 15, 1939 – July 9, 2025) was an American writer.

Miller was born on September 15, 1939, in Albemarle, North Carolina, into a family often referred to as the "Writing Rosses". Miller’s father, Fred Elbert Ross Jr. was a novelist, short story writer, editor and photographer; her aunt, Eleanor Ross Taylor, was a poet alongside her husband, Peter Taylor, a novelist and short story writer; her other aunt, Jean Ross Justice, also wrote short stories, with her husband, Donald Justice, a poet.

In 1961, she earned a bachelor's degree from Woman's College (now the University of North Carolina at Greensboro). She went on to earn an MFA in creative writing from the college in 1969. For the 1968–69 and 1973–74 years, she earned fellowships from the National Endowment for the Arts. Inspired by professor and poet Randall Jarrell, Miller became an instructor in reading and writing.

Throughout her career, she taught English at Southeastern Community College in Whiteville, North Carolina, where she served as head of the department; at Stanly Technical College (now Stanly Community College) in Albemarle, North Carolina; at Pfeiffer College (now Pfeiffer University) (1977-1983); at University of Arkansas (1983-1992), serving as director of the MFA program in creative writing from 1984-1986. In 1992, she joined the English faculty at Washington and Lee University, where she taught creative writing. She was a consultant to various state art councils and literary agencies and served as advisory editor for the literary journal Shenandoah . At W&L, she served as the Thomas H. Broadus Jr. Professor of English from 1999 until her retirement in 2003.

She earned the Alumni Achievement Award from UNC-Greensboro in 1976 and won the North Carolina Award for Literature in 1983. She published her first novel “The Edge of the Woods” (1964), at age 25. That book won the National Association of Independent Schools Award. Her second novel, “Tenants of the House” (1966), won a Sir Walter Raleigh Award for fiction, and her poetry book, “The Wind Southerly” (1967), won the Oscar Arnold Young Cup for poetry.

Miller died on July 9, 2025, at the age of 85.

== Books ==
- The Edge of the Woods (1964)
- Tenants of the House (1966)
- The Wind Southerly (1967)
- Gone a Hundred Miles (1968)
- Horse Horse Tyger Tyger (1973)
- A Spiritual Divorce and Other Stories (1974)
- Confessions of a Champeen Fire-Baton Twirler (1976)
- Therapia (1982)
- Adam's First Wife (1983)
- Hard Evidence (1990)
- La Jupe Espagnole (1991)
- Friends and Assassins (1993)
- In the Funny Papers (1995)
- Days of Love and Murder (1999)
- Champeen (1999)
- Crusoe's Island: A Story of a Writer and a Place (2000)
- Miss Jessie Dukes and Kid Heavy (2003)
- Freaks in Love (2004)
- Gypsy with Baby (2005)
- The Creative Writing Murders (2007)
- Lumina (2011)
- Celestial Navigator (2014)
