= Jules Chametzky =

American literary critic, writer, editor, and unionist (1928–2021)

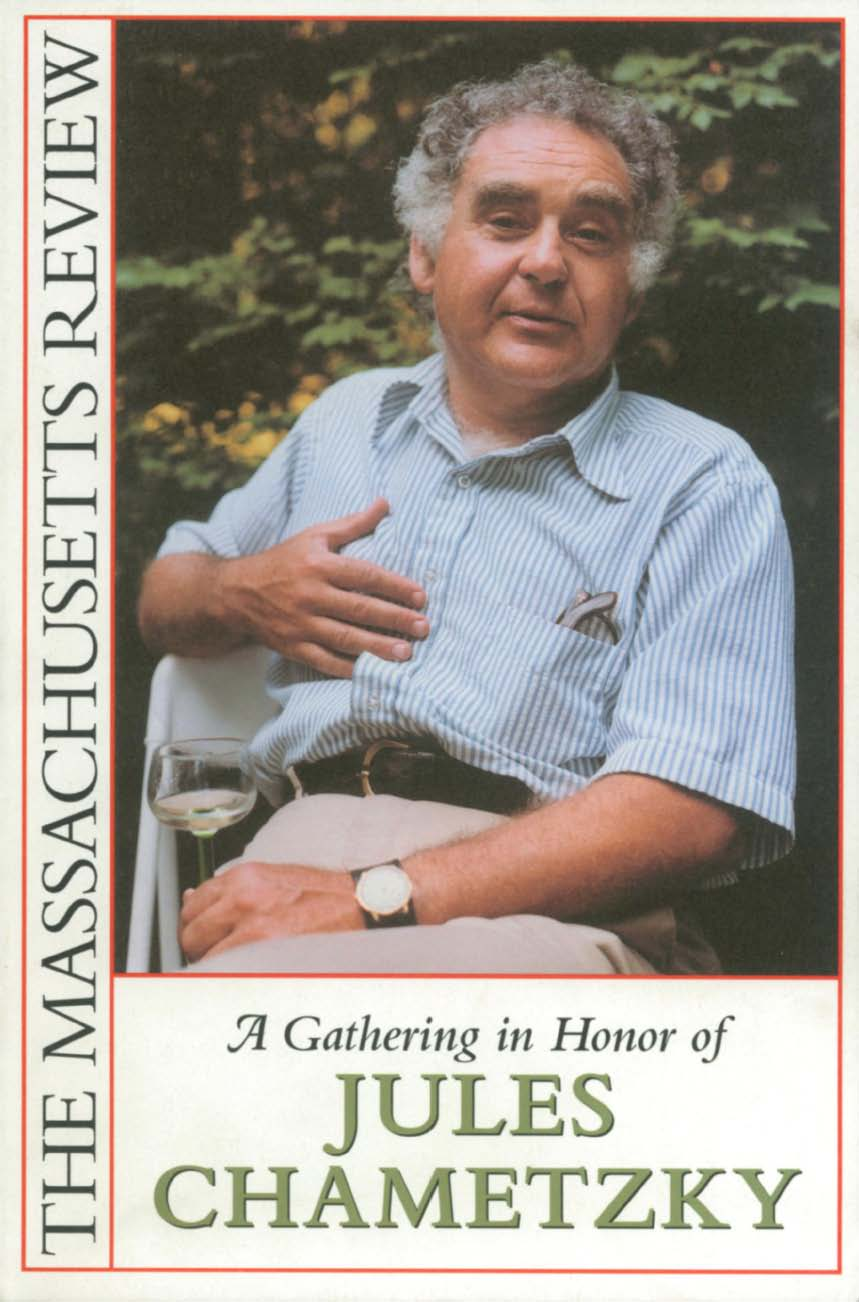
Cover, Massachusetts Review 44.1/2 Photo by Jerome Liebling

Jules Chametzky (May 24, 1928 – September 23, 2021) was an American literary critic, writer, editor, and unionist. His essays in the 1960s and 1970s on the importance of race, ethnicity, class, and gender to American literary culture anticipated the later schools of New Historicism and Cultural Studies in American letters.

Chametzky was a founder and long-time editor of the Massachusetts Review, an editor of Thought and Action, the journal of the National Education Association, as well as the third President of the Massachusetts Society of Professors, the faculty/library union at the University of Massachusetts. He was also a founding member of the Coordinating Committee of Literary Magazines (CCLM, now Community of Literary Magazines and Presses) and its first secretary. Chametzky was married for over fifty years to the writer, editor, and educator Anne Halley (1928–2004).

== Early life and education ==
Chametzky family photo, 1945. Jules is the young man in back, on the right, next to his father Beny. His mother Anna stands in front of them, holding a picture of Jules's older brother Leslie

Chametzky was born in Brooklyn, in 1928. His parents were immigrants who came to New York State from Eastern Europe, his father Beny from the Volhynia (now Ukraine) in 1913, and his mother Anna from Lublin, Poland. Both were Yiddish-speaking and working-class; his father worked in, and later owned, a butcher shop, and his mother worked in a sweater factory. His older brother Leslie enlisted in the infantry in 1940, participated in the North Africa invasion, and was taken prisoner by the Germans. Later freed by British and North American troops, he went on to take part in the Sicily campaign. Chametzky studied first at Brooklyn Tech, an engineering school, and then Brooklyn College, where he began writing plays, graduating in 1950. In 1948, he joined the American Labor Party, and became a member of the Labor Youth League and the NAACP two years later. He did his graduate work in English at the University of Minnesota, where he studied with Leo Marx and Henry Nash Smith and read Saul Bellow's Yiddish-inflected English for the first time. In 1953, Smith asked him to become an editor for the journal Faulkner Studies. He received his Ph.D. in 1958, and, with the support of Leo Marx, began teaching the following year in the English Department at the University of Massachusetts Amherst, where he was tenured in 1961, at the age of thirty-three. He was a Fulbright professor in Copenhagen, Tübingen, and Zagreb, as well as head of the University of Massachusetts program in Freiburg. He has also taught as visiting professor in Venice and at the Kennedy Institute (Freie Universität) and Humboldt-Universität in Berlin.

== Academic writing ==
The subject of Chametzky's Ph.D. dissertation—the plays of John Marston—reflected both his early interest in theater and the then dominant tastes of the New Criticism; his most influential writings on literature would respond instead to the themes of regionalism and ethnicity in other authors, such as Faulkner and Bellow, first read during his graduate school years. Typical of this work is the essay "Broadening the Canon: A Consideration of Regional, Ethnic, Racial, and Sexual Factors," which argues that the importance of authors such as George Washington Cable, Abraham Cahan, Charles W. Chesnutt, and Kate Chopin is missed when they are read as regional or "local color" writers. A collection of Chametzky's essays would later borrow from this essay's title in order to give a general description of his scholarship. His first book-length study focused on one of these same authors, the journalist, novelist, educator and translator Abraham Cahan. In 1988, Chametzky would serve as advisory editor for Lewis Fried's Handbook of American-Jewish Literature, and, in 2000, as a co-editor of Jewish American Literature: A Norton Anthology. A series of short, personalized portraits of noted literary figures—a number of which had previously appeared in the Massachusetts Review or on the "Jewish Currents" website—has recently been published as Out of Brownsville. Encounters with Nobel Laureates and Other Jewish Writers, by Meredith Winter Press and the University of Massachusetts Press.

== The Massachusetts Review ==
In 1958, Chametzky penned a memo suggesting that the University of Massachusetts's English Department sponsor a new literary magazine; the following year, the Massachusetts Review, a quarterly publication, was launched. The name of the magazine was chosen to honor an earlier journal, Emerson's Massachusetts Quarterly Review. Chametzky was the second managing editor of the journal and, from 1963 to 1974, co-edited the Review with John Hicks and others. Chametzky would be asked to return as co-editor in the 1990s, and, in 2001, he became MR's Editor Emeritus.

From its inception, the magazine had the support of the German and History departments as well as English, and when the English professor Sidney Kaplan—who would in 1970 become a founding member of the university's W.E.B. Du Bois Department of Afro-American Studies—joined the planning committee, the magazine's scope extended further. In a chapter from Enlarging America, the Harvard literary scholar Susanne Klingentein offers a description by Chametzky of the publication's editorial goals during its formative years: “We wanted to break the logjam of ideas represented by the New Criticism and formalism,” he commented; publishing so-called "marginal" voices (e.g., Jewish, black, and women writers) was one way of "letting in fresh political and ideological currents." Responding to the tumultuous times, in 1969 Chametzky and Kaplan put together a collection of essays from the first ten years of MR; Julius Lester, in the New York Times, called Black and White in American Culture "a rare anthology [...] with a higher degree of relevance than almost any other book of its kind."

In 1967, when the Council of Literary Magazines and Presses (CLMP) was formed by combining two previous organizations, Chametzky was a founding member and its first secretary. The organization's original name, the "Coordinating Council of Literary Magazines" was given by Chametzky, chosen in order to allude to the Student Nonviolent Coordinating Committee or SNCC. The other signatories to the original NEH grant request letter were editors of other prominent reviews: Robie Macauley, William Phillips, George Plimpton, and Reed Whittemore.

== Public service ==
Having joined the NAACP in 1950, at the University of Minnesota, Chametzky headed the organization's committee on fair employment practices, and was "intensely involved in Minnesota's passing of the first American Fair Practices Employment Act". Differing with their position on the national (i.e., Jewish/Zionist) question, disagreeing that social realism was the best way to judge or write literature, and opposing Stalinist methods of dealing with political opposition, Chametzky refused to join the American Communist Party. His self-definition as "a member of the non-communist—i.e. social democratic, or democratic socialist—left" was confirmed definitively by the trial and execution of Rudolf Slansky, a Czech Jew, formerly Secretary-General of the Czechoslovak Communist Party. Such decisions, however, were no protection when in January 1954 Chametzky was named by a witness before the U.S. Justice Department's Subversive Activities Control Board. The case received extensive coverage in the local papers, and Chametzky was called to testify before a special Investigating Committee headed by the University of Minnesota President. He was eventually cleared later that same year.

Chametzky was a union man from an early age, and a member of the United Electrical, Radio and Machine Workers of America (UE) during his Brooklyn years. At the University of Massachusetts, he supported the Massachusetts Society of Professors (MSP) from its inception in 1972–73, and became the union's third President in 1979–80. A key accomplishment of his tenure at that post was reconciling the union on the Amherst campus with its members (fewer, though more radicalized) from the university's Boston campus—and developing operating procedures for resolving disputes between them. Chametzky was also responsible for opening direct lines of communication with the campus administration, and for establishing a cooperative relationship between union and administration on some issues. He served two terms in Washington as an editor for Thought and Action, the National Education Association journal for higher education. On the subject of faculty unions, Chametzky cited (and agreed with) Vladimir Lenin, that they are "just a defensive arm lifted up to ward off a blow." "But," he added, "you need that arm to defend and extend the rights of the faculty [....] You need the union's voice so that you won't just barely survive, but live with dignity."

== Death ==
Chametzky died in 2021 in Amherst, Massachusetts.

== Selected bibliography ==
Books (author)

- Reason and desire in the plays of John Marston. Ann Arbor, University Microfilms, 1972 [1958]
- From the Ghetto: The Fiction of Abraham Cahan. Amherst: University of Massachusetts Press, 1977 ISBN 978-0-87023-225-1
- Our Decentralized Literature: Cultural Mediations in Selected Jewish and Southern Writers. Amherst: University of Massachusetts Press, 1986 ISBN 978-0-87023-540-5
- Out of Brownsville: Encounters with Nobel Laureates and Other Jewish Writers. Cambridge: Meredith Winter Press, 2012 ISBN 978-0-9728573-4-5; reissued Amherst: University of Massachusetts Press, 2013 ISBN 9781625340368

Books (editor)

- John Spargo, The Bitter Cry of the Children. New York, Johnson Reprint Corp., 1969 ISBN 978-0-384-56900-3
- Jules Chametzky and Sidney Kaplan, Black & White in American Culture; An Anthology from the Massachusetts Review. University of Massachusetts Press, 1969 ISBN 978-0-87023-046-2
- Lewis Fried, with Gene Brown, Jules Chametzky, and Louis Harap. Handbook of American-Jewish Literature: An Analytical Guide to Topics, Themes, and Sources. New York: Greenwood Press, 1988. ISBN 978-0-313-24593-0
- Writers Speak : America and the Ethnic Experience. Amherst: Institute for Advanced Study in Humanities, 1984
- A Tribute to James Baldwin : Black writers redefine the struggle. Amherst: Institute for Advanced Study in Humanities, 1989 ISBN 978-0-87023-677-8
- Abraham Cahan, The Rise of David Levinsky/Abraham Cahan. New York: Penguin Books, 1993 ISBN 978-1-4043-2852-5
- Jules Chametzky, John Felstiner, Hilene Flanzbaum, and Kathryn Hellerstein. Jewish American Literature: A Norton Anthology. New York : Norton, 2000 ISBN 978-0-393-04809-4

Articles

- "Notes on the Assimilation of the Jewish-American Writer: Abraham Cahan to Saul Bellow," Jahrbuch fǖr Amerikastudiern, Bd. 9 (1964) pp. 173–80 JSTOR 41155281
- "Our Decentralized Literature: A Consideration of Regional, Ethnic, Racial, and Sexual Factors," Jahrbuch fǖr Amerikastudiern, Bd. 17 (1972) pp. 56–72 JSTOR 41155602
- "Ethnicity and beyond: An Introduction," Massachusetts Review Vol. 27, No. 2 (1986) pp. 242–51 JSTOR 25089755
- "Public Intellectuals—Now and Then," MELUS Vol. 29, No. 3/4 (2004) pp. 211–26.
