= Mary Doyle Curran =

American writer and teacher (1917–1981)

Mary Doyle Curran (May 10, 1917 – 1981) was an American poet, novelist, and teacher. Her work, described by poet Anne Halley as being "haunted" by issues of gender, ethnicity, and class, included many poems and a novel dealing with Irish-American life.

== Biography ==
First edition cover of The Parish and the Hill, Curran's most famous work, which illustrated the class divides among Irish in her birthplace of Holyoke, Massachusetts

Curran was born Mary Doyle in Holyoke, Massachusetts, and educated at Massachusetts State College. She married George Curran in 1940; they had no children and later divorced. Curran earned her PhD in English at the University of Iowa in 1946, and taught at Wellesley College and Queens College before directing the program in Irish Studies at the University of Massachusetts Boston.

While at Queens, her students included poet Lloyd Schwartz, who reported after her death that she included contemporary poets such as Robert Lowell, Elizabeth Bishop, James Wright, and Richard Wilbur in her survey of American literature even though "she wasn't supposed to." Another student at Queens was civil rights activist Andrew Goodman; after Goodman was murdered, Curran found among her papers a poem he had written for her class, "A Corollary to a Poem by A. E. Housman," and had it published in The Massachusetts Review; it was also published in The New York Times.

Her most influential work was The Parish and the Hill, a novel published in 1948. In a review in the New York Times, Mary McGrory describes it as "a bold book" and "an album-like novel made up of unflattering, unretouched pictures of three generations of an Irish-American family. . . written in a vehement, highly partisan tone." In an interview with the Boston Post, Curran said, "it is my family of whom I am writing." Subsequently the novel has been understood in a feminist context; as one critic puts it, the protagonist's "personal strength and her narrative voice reflect the honesty of a cooperative matrilineal heritage, a legacy which is continually contrasted to the competitive patrimony of hypocrisy and affectation divided among the male members of her family." It was republished by the Feminist Press in 1986, and, as of 2022, remains in print.

At the time of her death in 1981 she had been working on an intended compilation of her unpublished work, some of which had been rejected decades earlier due to its preoccupation "with frustration and death," with the title The Paper City.
