= The Massachusetts Review =

American literary journal

- Discipline: Literary journal
- Language: English
- Edited by: Britt Rusert

Publication details
- History: 1959–present
- Publisher: Massachusetts Review, Inc., with support from Amherst, Hampshire, Mount Holyoke, and Smith Colleges, and the University of Massachusetts Amherst (United States)
- Frequency: Quarterly

Standard abbreviations
- ISO 4: Mass. Rev.

Indexing
- ISSN: 0025-4878
- JSTOR: 00254878

Links
- Journal homepage

The Massachusetts Review is a literary quarterly founded in 1959 by a group of professors from Amherst College, Mount Holyoke College, Smith College, and the University of Massachusetts Amherst. It receives financial support from Five Colleges, Inc., a consortium which includes Amherst College and four other educational institutions in a short geographical radius.

== History ==
MR bills itself as "A Quarterly of Literature, the Arts, and Public Affairs." A key early focus was on civil rights as well as African-American history and culture; the Review published, among many others, Gwendolyn Brooks, Sterling A. Brown, Lucille Clifton, W.E.B. Du Bois, and Martin Luther King Jr. Sidney Kaplan, a founder of the Du Bois Department of Afro-American Studies at the University of Massachusetts, was a founding member of MR as well; Ekwueme Michael Thelwell, also a founder of Afro-American Studies at UMass, continues to serve as a contributing editor. In 1969, co-editor Jules Chametzky and Kaplan put together a collection of essays from the first ten years of MR; Julius Lester, in the New York Times, called Black and White in American Culture "a rare anthology [...] with a higher degree of relevance than almost any other book of its kind."

In 1972, MR published a double issue, entitled Woman: An Issue, edited by Lisa Baskin, Lee Edwards, and Mel Heath, featuring work from Bella Abzug, Angela Davis, Audre Lorde, Norman Mailer, Anaïs Nin, Tina Modotti, and Sonia Sanchez. Recent special issues include the 2008 Especially Queer Issue (edited by John Emil Vincent, and featuring new work from Frank Bidart, Michael Moon, and Jack Spicer, as well as an interview with Judith Butler and a conversation between Michael Snediker and Eve Kosofsky Sedgwick) as well as the 2011 Casualty Issue (co-edited by Kevin Bowen and Jim Hicks, with work from John Berger, Erri De Luca, Juan Goytisolo, Yusef Komunyakaa, David Rabe, and Nora Strejilevich).

== Achievements ==
MR is known for visual as well as literary arts. Its cover design was initially conceived by the sculptor and graphic artist Leonard Baskin, who contributed work throughout his career. Jerome Liebling – the photographer, filmmaker, and mentor to Ken Burns – was also an MR editor. Recent artists featured in magazine inserts include Manuel Álvarez Bravo, Whitfield Lovell, Anna Schuleit, and Dan Witz.

The Massachusetts Review has published 10 Nobel Prize winners, 23 Pulitzer Prize winners, and 9 United States Poets Laureate. Influential individual works from its pages include contributions from Chinua Achebe’s “An Image of Africa: Racism in Conrad's Heart of Darkness", Robert Frost, Martin Luther King Jr.’s “Legacy of Creative Protest", Roberto Fernández Retamar’s “Caliban", Adrienne Rich’s “Blood, Bread, and Poetry", and Jean-Paul Sartre’s “Black Orpheus".

The Community of Literary Magazines and Presses (CLMP, formerly CCLM) website notes: "[In 1967, t]he Coordinating Council of Literary Magazines (CCLM) [was] founded by a board of magazine editors at the suggestion of the National Endowment for the Arts (NEA), to act as an NEA regranter. The signatories of the original letter of intent to the NEA [were] Reed Whittemore (The Carleton Miscellany, New Republic); Jules Chametzky (The Massachusetts Review); George Plimpton (The Paris Review); Robie Macauley (The Kenyon Review); and William Phillips (The Partisan Review).

== Prizes ==
The magazine awards the Anne Halley Poetry prize to the best poem it published yearly; it also awards the Jules Chametzky Prize for Translation each year, alternating between its prose and poetry translations.

== Masthead ==
The current staff includes: Jules Chametzky, founding editor; Britt Rusert, executive editor; Abigail Chabitnoy and Nathan McClain, poetry editors; Francesca Bellei, Asha Nadkarni, and Jemimah James Wei, prose editors; Pam Glaven, art director and Mario Ontiveros, art editor; Shailja Patel and F. Orlandi, public affairs editors; Mona Kareem poetry-in-translation editor, Corine Tachtiris, prose-in-translation editor, Jack Saebyok Jung, translation editor; Dominic Taylor, theater editor; Richie Wills, reviews editor, Michael Thurston, poetry reviews editor; Emily Wojcik, business manager; Edward Clifford, managing editor; Franchesca Viaud, assistant editor; G. Ziegel, editorial assistant.

== See also ==
- List of literary magazines
