= Charles Macauley =

Charles Macauley may refer to:

- Charles R. Macauley (1871–1934), American cartoonist
- C. Cameron Macauley (1923–2007), American photographer and filmmaker
- Ed Macauley (Charles Edward Macauley, 1928–2011), basketball player

== See also ==
- Charles McAuley (1910–1999), Irish painter
- Charles Macaulay (1927-1999), American actor and director
