= Robie Macauley =

American novelist

- Robie Macauley in September, 1962.
- Born: Robie Mayhew Macauley; May 31, 1919; Grand Rapids, Michigan, United States
- Died: November 20, 1995 (aged 76); Boston, Massachusetts, United States
- Occupations: Novelist; short story writer; essayist; critic; editor
- Writing career
- Notable works: The Disguises of Love; The End of Pity and Other Stories; A Secret History of Time to Come; Technique in Fiction

Robie Mayhew Macauley (May 31, 1919 – November 20, 1995) was an American editor, novelist and critic whose literary career spanned more than 50 years.

== Biography ==
=== Early life ===
Robie Mayhew Macauley was born on May 31, 1919, in Grand Rapids, Michigan. He was the older brother of the noted photographer and movie producer C. Cameron Macauley. His uncle owned and published the Hudsonville newspaper, The Ottawa Times (named for Ottawa County), and Macauley used the printing press to publish his first books of fiction and poetry. At age 18 he printed and bound a limited edition of Solomon's Cat, a previously unpublished poem by Walter Duranty, setting the type and engraving the illustrations.

=== Education ===
As an undergraduate at Olivet College, he was a student of Ford Madox Ford (describing him as "my first teacher and editorial mentor.").Macauley's 1950 introduction to Ford's Parade’s End includes his reflections as an undergraduate.

Macauley then won a three-year literary prize scholarship and transferred to Kenyon College to be a student of John Crowe Ransom. There he lived in a writer's house with Robert Lowell, Peter Taylor, and Randall Jarrell. He was elected to Phi Beta Kappa during February 1941, and the same year was awarded a fellowship to attend the Bread Loaf Writers' Conference. He graduated summa cum laude from Kenyon in June 1941.

=== War years ===
He was drafted in March 1942 and served in World War II as a special agent in the Counterintelligence Corps (CIC) with the 97th Infantry Division, in the "Ruhr Pocket" and then in Japan after the war.

On April 23, 1945, Macauley's division helped liberate Flossenbürg concentration camp. Macauley later said, "I entered some concentration camps the day we liberated them--the most horrifying days of my life. My job was to interview survivors. Most of the bodies that I saw had been stripped and it was impossible to tell which were those of Jews and which of Christians. Nazi murder was a great leveler, fully ecumenical... Hitler's bell tolled for all..."

Macauley wrote four autobiographical short stories based on his experiences doing intelligence work, collected in The End of Pity and Other Stories, (1957). In "A Nest of Gentlefolk", (winner of the 1949 Furioso Prize) he describes the CIC's futile search for Nazi war criminals in the war-ravaged town of Hohenlohe; in The Thin Voice he describes the unsuccessful attempt by an American officer to prevent some freed Russian POWs from killing a vicious collaborator in Heiligenkreuz, Germany; in "The End of Pity" he tells the story of a woman's suicide after visiting her ruined house in a combat zone in Oberkassel; and in "The Mind is its Own Place" he describes his brief post-war encounter in Karuizawa, Japan with Captain Kermit Beahan, bombardier of the bomber "The Bockscar" who released the atomic bomb over Nagasaki. Macauley described Beahan as "a young captain with a college-boy face [who] had suffered some strange mutation of feeling so deep and so destructive..."

According to Macauley's letters archived at the University of North Carolina, while in Karuizawa he was friends with former Japanese Ambassador to the US Saburō Kurusu and German Admiral Paul Wenneker, as well as pianist Leo Sirota and artist Paul Jacoulet. He was also acquainted with three-time former Japanese Prime Minister Prince Fumimaro Konoe, to whom he presented a copy of The American Leviathan: The Republic in the Machine Age, written by Charles A. Beard.

In his capacity as CIC Station Chief, he supervised the arrests, on October 30, 1945, of a number of prominent Nazi leaders who were in hiding in Karuizawa: Franz-Josef Spahn, Nazi Gruppenleiter in Japan; Paul Sperringer, a former SS Stormtrooper and assistant to Gestapo Chief Colonel Josef Meisinger; Karl Hamel, Meisinger's secretary; Charles Schmidt-Jucheim, a former San Francisco police officer and an ex-US Army sergeant who attended Gestapo training in Germany and renounced his US citizenship; Karlfried Graf Dürckheim, chief of Nazi propaganda in Japan; Heinrich Loy, a Gestapo spy who allegedly participated in the Munich Beer Hall Putsch; Dr. Karl Kindermann, Meisinger's Jewish interpreter who was an informant for the Gestapo; Alrich Mosaner, chief of the Hitler Youth in Japan; and Otto Burmeister, chief of the Nazi education system in Japan. Most of these individuals were later released by the CIC.

Robie Macauley was awarded the Legion of Merit for his work in detaining members of the Gestapo in Japan.

== Career ==
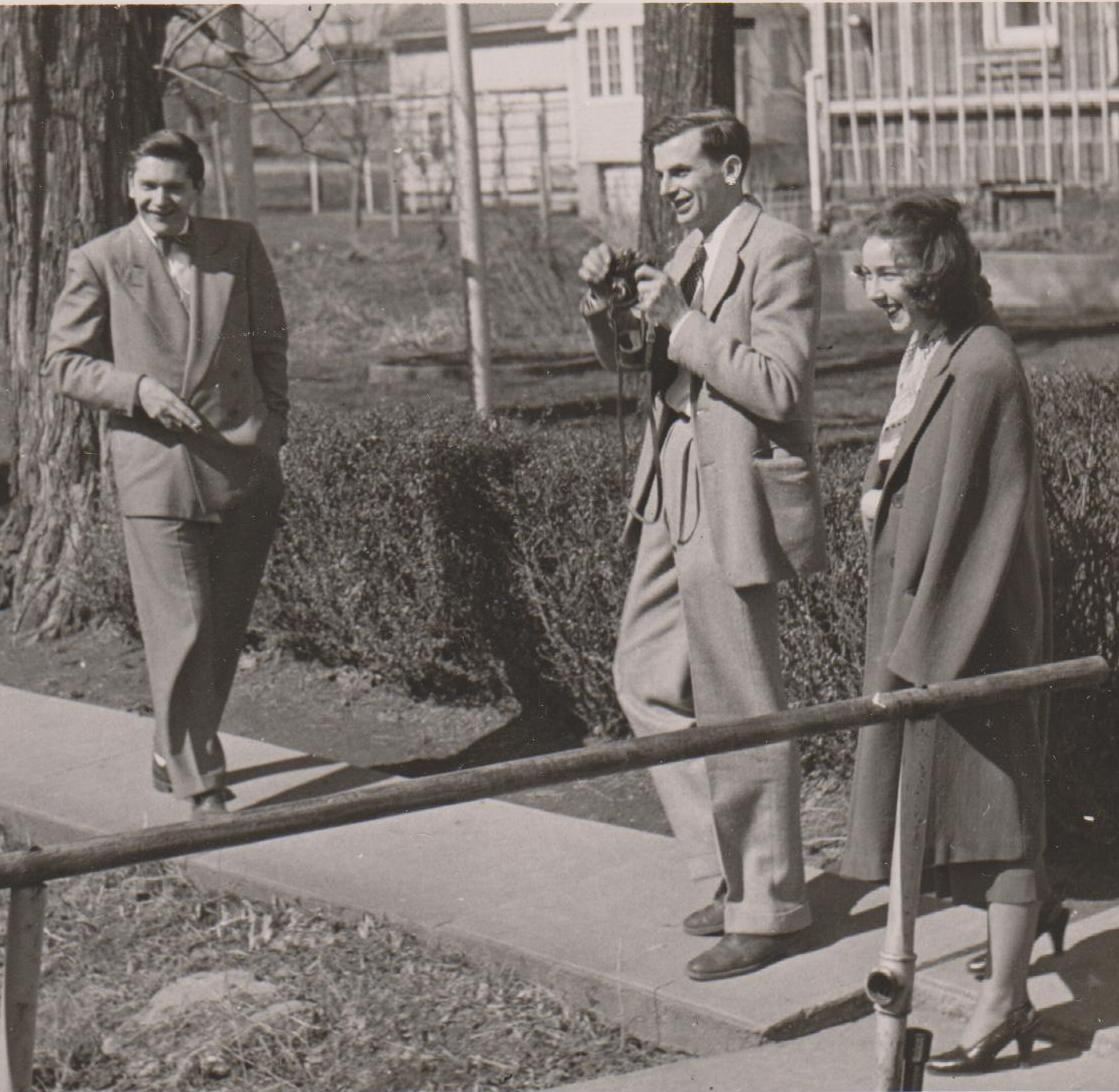
Robie Macauley with Arthur Koestler and Flannery O'Connor on a visit to the Amana Colonies in 1947. Macauley's camera is a Certo Dollina II. Photo by C. Cameron Macauley.

=== Iowa Writers Workshop ===
After the war, he taught briefly at Bard College then worked at Gourmet Magazine and for Henry Holt and Company. During 1947 he taught at the University of Iowa Writer's Workshop with Paul Engle, and Anthony Hecht (with whom Macauley had served during World War II), where he befriended Flannery O'Connor, advising her on drafts of her first novel, Wise Blood. He completed his MFA at the University of Iowa in 1950 and spent the next three years at the Woman's College (now The University of North Carolina at Greensboro) where he taught modern American literature and writing.

=== The Congress for Cultural Freedom ===
Macauley received a Rockefeller Fellowship and during 1953 Cord Meyer offered him a position in the International Organizations Division of the Central Intelligence Agency. With John Crowe Ransom's encouragement, Macauley accepted and relocated to Paris where he participated in the Congress for Cultural Freedom. Macauley assisted in the publication of Quadrant magazine (edited by James McAuley), an Australian literary journal that at the time had "an anticommunist thrust".

He was a U.S. representative to the International PEN Congress in Tokyo (1957) and Brazil (1960).

=== The Kenyon Review ===
John Crowe Ransom (right) with Robie Macauley as he prepares to become editor of The Kenyon Review during 1958.

During 1958 he returned to the US to succeed John Crowe Ransom as editor of The Kenyon Review. Ransom described Macauley as "wise and thorough, thoroughly experienced, an excellent critic...; a pretty good fiction writer who has just begun to get a lot better; and a person universally admired and liked." During the next seven years, Macauley published works by T. S. Eliot, Nadine Gordimer, Robert Graves, Randall Jarrell, Richmond Lattimore, Doris Lessing, Robert Lowell, V. S. Naipaul, Joyce Carol Oates, Frank O'Connor, V. S. Pritchett, Thomas Pynchon, J. F. Powers, Karl Shapiro, Jean Stafford, Christina Stead, Peter Taylor, and Robert Penn Warren, as well as articles, essays and book reviews by Eric Bentley, Cleanth Brooks, R. P. Blackmur, Malcolm Cowley, Richard Ellmann, Leslie Fiedler, Martin Green, and Raymond Williams. In 1964, he served as a fiction judge for the National Book Awards together with John Cheever and Philip Rahv. He received a Guggenheim Fellowship and took a sabbatical in 1964–65 as a Fulbright Research Fellow at the University of London.

=== Playboy Magazine ===
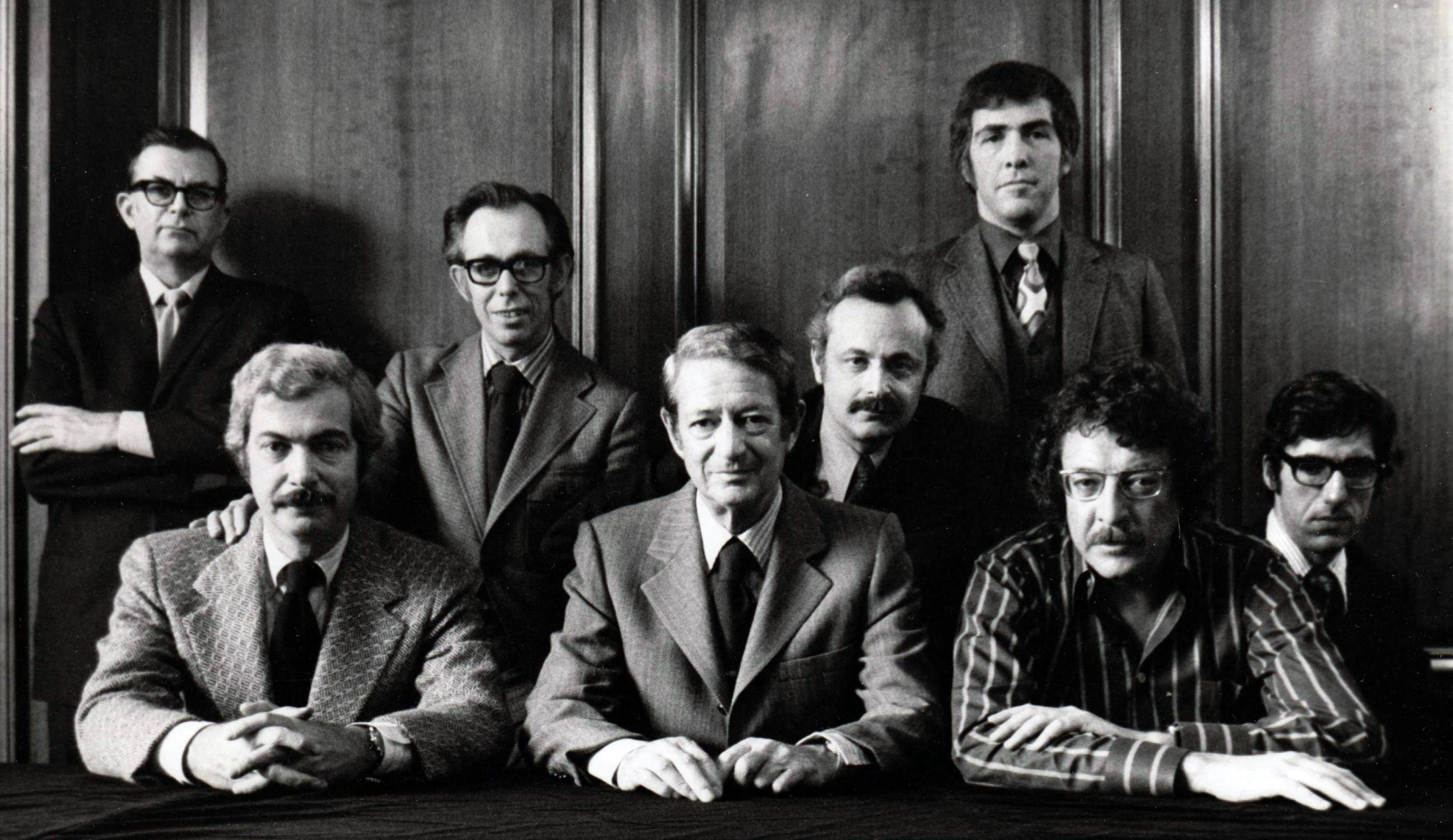
Robie Macauley on the editorial board of Playboy in 1970. Back, left to right: Robie Macauley, Nat Lehrman, Richard M. Koff, Murray Fisher, Arthur Kretchmer; front: Sheldon Wax, Auguste Comte Spectorsky, Jack Kessie.

In 1966 Macauley became the fiction editor at Playboy, where he published fiction by Saul Bellow, Michael Crichton, John Cheever, Roald Dahl, James Dickey, J. P. Donleavy, Nadine Gordimer, John Irving, Arthur Koestler, John le Carré, Ursula K. Le Guin, Doris Lessing, Bernard Malamud, Mary McCarthy, Vladimir Nabokov, Joyce Carol Oates, Seán Ó Faoláin, Anne Sexton, Irwin Shaw, Isaac B. Singer, John Updike, and Kurt Vonnegut as well as poetry by Yevgeny Yevtushenko. David H. Lynn, writing in The Kenyon Review, said that "in the years when he was fiction editor, Playboy was second only to The New Yorker in prestige as a place for serious writers to display their talents." During this period he also taught fiction at the MFA program at the University of Illinois at Chicago, Circle Campus.

In 1967, he co-initiated the Council of Literary Magazines and Presses together with Reed Whittemore (The Carleton Miscellany, The New Republic); Jules Chametzky (The Massachusetts Review); George Plimpton (The Paris Review); and William Phillips (The Partisan Review).

=== Houghton Mifflin ===
In 1978, he became a senior editor at Houghton Mifflin, where he was responsible for publishing The Mosquito Coast, The Marrakesh One-Two, Shoeless Joe, and several works of nonfiction such as Breaking the Ring: The Bizarre Case of the Walker Family Spy Ring, Techno-Bandits, Getting to Yes, The Puzzle Palace, The Bunker, The Dungeon Master, and The Nine Nations of North America. He later taught at the Harvard Extension School and during 1990 co-initiated and co-directed the Ploughshares International Writing Seminars, a summer program of the Emerson College European Center at Kasteel Well in the Netherlands.

== Death ==
Macauley died of non-Hodgkin's lymphoma in Boston on November 20, 1995.

== Publications ==
=== Novels ===
During his life Robie Macauley published two novels, The Disguises of Love (1951), the story of a university professor's love affair with a student and how it affects his wife and son, and A Secret History of Time to Come (1979), an adventure thriller set in a devastated post-apocalypse America 200 years in the future.

His last two novels, Citadel of Ice: Life and Death in a Glacier Fortress during World War I, (2014), and The Escape of Alfred Dreyfus, (2016) were published posthumously.

=== Short stories ===
His short fiction appeared in Furioso, the North American Review, The Kenyon Review, The Sewanee Review, The Southern Review, Shenandoah, Esquire, Fiction, Ellery Queen's Mystery Magazine, Cosmopolitan, the Virginia Quarterly Review and Playboy, for which he was awarded the Furioso Prize (1949), The O. Henry Award (1951, 1956 and 1967), and the John Train Humor Prize (1990).

In spite of his expertise and experience, Macauley's own fiction received only moderate recognition. "Robie Macauley's prose, like the best poetry, has a startling economy of means and precision of language", declared Melvin J. Friedman in Contemporary Novelists. "The author's work", continued Friedman, "is the enviable product of years spent in close and sympathetic relationship with the best novels from Jane Austen through James Joyce." David H. Lynn, editor of The Kenyon Review, described Macauley's fiction as "subtle, stinging, disturbing, witty." Eugene Goodheart, commenting on The End of Pity and Other Stories, said "Macauley has all the gifts of a master short story writer: narrative power, a quick and vivid imagination of character...a capacity for delivering the scene that at once surprises and satisfies the reader's expectation, i.e., a fine sense for the significant scene or action, a felicity of phrase that is not merely decoration, but becomes perception."

Since 2001 StoryQuarterly has awarded the annual "Robie Macauley Award for Fiction."

=== Nonfiction ===
He co-authored (with George Lanning) a textbook on writing, Technique in Fiction (1964, revised in 1989), and co-authored (with William Betcher) a book on marriage counseling, The Seven Basic Quarrels of Marriage (1990). He edited America and Its Discontents together with Larzer Ziff. Between 1942 and 1990 he contributed dozens of book reviews to The New York Times Book Review, The Kenyon Review, Furioso, Vogue, The New York Herald Tribune, The Partisan Review, The Boston Globe, The New York Review of Books, Encounter, The New Republic, The Chicago Sun-Times, Dialogue, the Boston Review, and other publications. He also wrote a series of contemplative essays on writing, writers and literature which were published in Shenandoah, The Irish University Review, Transition, The Texas Quarterly, Ploughshares, and The Paris Review.

== Bibliography ==
- The Disguises of Love (1951)
- The End of Pity and Other Stories (1957)
- Technique in Fiction (1964, revised 1987)
- A Secret History of Time to Come (1979, illustrated by Mark Hess)
- Citadel of Ice (2014, published posthumously)
- The Escape of Alfred Dreyfus (2016, published posthumously)
- Silence, Exile, and Cunning (2025, published posthumously)
