= Freek (rapper) =

UAE-based Somali rapper (born 1990)

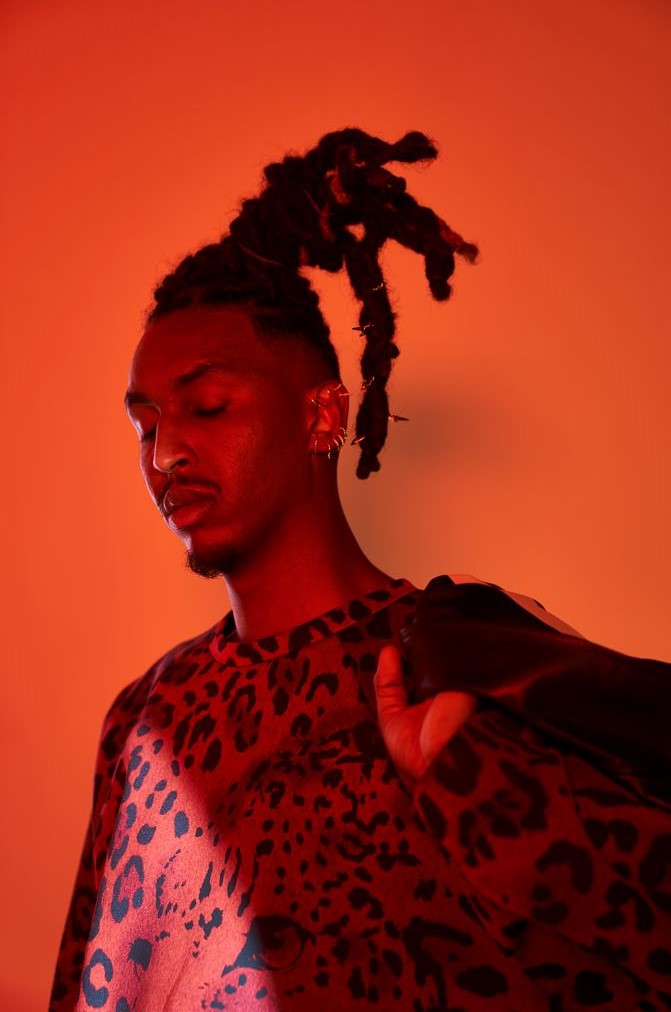

Background information
- Born: Mustafa Mohamed Ismail; 23 July 1990 (age 35); Abu Dhabi, UAE
- Origin: Somalia
- Genres: Underground; Trap; Hip Hop
- Occupations: Rapper; Singer; Music director; Record producer
- Years active: 2014–present
- Website: freektv.net/FTV/

Mustafa Mohamed Ismail (born 23 July, 1990), professionally known by his stage name, Freek, is a UAE-based Somali rapper, singer, music director and record producer. He is noted as one of the contributors to the Arabic drill rap music genre and in particular, to the GCC's underground music scene.

== Personal life ==
Freek was born and raised in Abu Dhabi to Somali parents who migrated to the UAE in the 1970s.

== Career ==
Freek's career as a musician began with Alonzo's track titled Batali released in 2014 and his first single Aslan 3adi was released in 2015. His 2019 single, Wala Kilma, was used in a 2019 Adidas marketing campaign featuring popular football player, Mohamed Salah. Wala Kilma, which was listed on Link Up TV, was later remixed with British rappers Eyez and Young Tribez. The record landed Freek his debut performance in London and Leicester in December 2019. This later paved the way to a series of performances in the UAE, including being the opening act for Sole DXB, Abu Dhabi Grand Prix and Expo 2020. Other musicians headlining the aforementioned events included Future, Gucci Mane and the Wu-Tang Clan.

In 2020, Freek was written about and praised extensively by Kuwaiti writer Mona Kareem. In her article, she claims "Freek comes as one of the first Gulf rappers to have taken it to the hit-making level, expanding Arabic hip hop beyond conscious rap and YouTube niche", though no data was provided to contextualize or substantiate her claims. In 2021 Freek was featured on the Charlie Sloth’s Fire in The Booth (Dubai Series) and on the Virgin Radio Dubai's Regional Artist Spotlight in 2022, both of which are programs covering budding underground artists in the UAE's hip hop scene. That same year, Freek's first studio-recorded album titled "150" was released.

== Discography ==
=== Singles ===
- 2015 Aslan 3Adi
- 2019 Wala Kilma
- 2019 Wala Kilma Remix (ft. Young Tribez & Eyez)
- 2019 Wadha
- 2019 La Titfalsaf
- 2020 Shwaya (Freek & Don Fuego)
- 2020 Mush Fathi
- 2020 Khali Wali
- 2020 Team (ft. Ab)
- 2021 Khfi

=== Albums ===
==== "150" (2022) ====
- Floos (ft. The Synaptic)
- La Tithawar (ft. Lil Eazy)
- Doos
- Sah Wala La (ft. TooDope)
- Mia Mia
- Samehni
- Kathab
- Min That (ft. Alyoungofficial & Randarofficial)

=== Collaborations ===
- 2014 Batali (Alonzo ft. Freek)
- 2022 Lali (The Synaptic, Freek & EQuBE)
- 2021 Nas Ghareeba (Oman Dafencii, Khayyat ft. Freek)
