= George Lanning =

American novelist

- Born: George William Lanning, Jr. July 30, 1925; Lakewood, Ohio
- Died: August 5, 1995 (aged 70); Cleveland, Ohio
- Occupations: Novelist; short story writer; critic
- Writing career
- Notable works: The Pedestal; Technique in Fiction

George William Lanning Jr. (July 30, 1925 – August 5, 1995) was an American editor, novelist and critic whose literary career spanned the 1950s through the 1980s.

== Biography ==
=== Early life ===
George Lanning was born on July 30, 1925, in Lakewood, Ohio. He was the only child of George William Lanning (1886–1969) and Helen A. Lanning (née Gravatt) (1898–1968). His father was born in Yarmouth in Elgin County, Ontario, and moved to the United States in 1904. His mother was born in Philadelphia, Pennsylvania. His parents married on October 18, 1920.

=== Education ===
As an undergraduate at Kenyon College, he majored in English and was a student of John Crowe Ransom. He received an AB, graduating summa cum laude from Kenyon in 1952.

== Career ==
=== The Kenyon Review ===
While continuing his association with Kenyon College after graduating (he received a Fellowship in Fiction in 1954–1955), he was an assistant editor at The World Publishing Company. He was an associate editor of the magazine The Kenyon Review from 1960 to 1967, and editor from 1967 to 1970. Kenyon College closed down the magazine due to financial burdens; the last issue (Vol. 32, #1) was published in April 1970. (It was started up again in 1979 under different management.) He taught the techniques of fiction at writers' conferences at the Universities of New Hampshire and Colorado, and was visiting writer at Longwood College.

== Publications ==
=== Short stories and criticism ===
His first professional sale of a short story was "Old Turkey Neck" in Tomorrow magazine in 1950, while still a student at Kenyon. His stories and criticism appeared in The Best American and O. Henry collections and various magazines.

=== Novels ===
He published three novels. This Happy Rural Seat was published by The World Publishing Company in 1953. The Pedestal was published by Harper & Row in 1966, and was nominated for Best First Novel by Mystery Writers of America in 1967. His third novel was Green Corn Moon, published by Viking in 1968.

=== Nonfiction ===
He co-authored (with Robie Macauley) a textbook on writing, Technique in Fiction (first published by Harper & Row in 1964, second edition published by St. Martin's Press in 1987).

== Membership ==
He was a member of Phi Beta Kappa, The Authors Guild, and the Rowfant Club of Cleveland. He died on August 5, 1995.
