= Community of Literary Magazines and Presses =

American nonprofit literary organization

- Abbreviation: CLMP
- Formation: 1967; 59 years ago
- Type: Nonprofit literary organization
- Tax ID no.: EIN 526074500
- Legal status: 501(c)(3)
- Headquarters: 90 Broad Street, Suite 2100
- Location: New York City, New York, U.S.
- Services: Technical assistance, professional development, awards, grant programs, and directory services for independent literary publishers
- Revenue: $1,473,111 (FY ended June 2025)
- Expenses: $1,631,944 (FY ended June 2025)
- Website: Official website
- Formerly called: Coordinating Council of Literary Magazines (1967–1989); Council of Literary Magazines and Presses (1989–2015)

The Community of Literary Magazines and Presses (CLMP) is an American nonprofit membership organization for independent literary publishers, including literary magazines and presses. Based in New York City, it provides professional development, technical assistance, grants, awards, and a directory of publishers.

Founded in 1967 as the Coordinating Council of Literary Magazines, it was renamed the Council of Literary Magazines and Presses in 1989 and adopted its current name in 2015. As of early 2026, CLMP reported 1,192 member organizations.

== History ==
CLMP was founded in 1967 as the Coordinating Council of Literary Magazines (CCLM) at the suggestion of the National Endowment for the Arts (NEA). Its founders were Robie Macauley, Reed Whittemore, Jules Chametzky, George Plimpton, and William Phillips. Poet Carolyn Kizer was the organization's first leader.

In 1989, the organization was renamed the Council of Literary Magazines and Presses. On April 1, 2015, it adopted its current name, Community of Literary Magazines and Presses.

Over time, CLMP expanded from an advocacy and service group for literary magazines into a broader membership organization serving literary magazines, independent presses, and publishers.

== Programs ==
CLMP offers workshops, roundtables, one-on-one consultations, and other resources for literary publishers. It also maintains a free online directory of independent literary publishers.

Since 1997, CLMP has administered the New York State Council on the Arts New York State Technical Assistance Program (NYSCA NYTAP) for New York-based independent literary publishers. In 2026, the program's regrant component offered capacity-building grants to eligible New York State literary magazines and presses.

CLMP also administers the Literary Magazine Fund in partnership with Amazon Literary Partnership.

== Awards ==
CLMP administers the annual Firecracker Awards for Independently Published Literature, which honor books and magazines published by independent literary publishers. The awards are presented in the categories of fiction, creative nonfiction, poetry, magazines/general excellence, and magazines/best debut. The current CLMP-administered version was launched in 2015 after the earlier Firecracker Awards had last been presented in 2002.

Since 2017, CLMP has also administered the annual Lord Nose Award, which recognizes a lifetime of work in literary publishing. In 2021, CLMP launched the Constellation Award, an annual $10,000 prize for an independent literary press that champions the writing of people of color.

== Response to the Small Press Distribution closure ==
After Small Press Distribution ceased operations in March 2024, CLMP published guidance and organized support for affected publishers. In 2024, KQED reported that CLMP had fielded hundreds of questions from publishers, launched surveys, and hosted consultations in response to the closure. In January 2025, Publishers Weekly reported that CLMP awarded $285,000 in Small Press Future Fund grants to 35 literary publishers formerly distributed by Small Press Distribution.

== See also ==
- List of literary magazines
- Literary presses
