= Bells for John Whiteside's Daughter =

1924 elegy by John Crowe Ransom

"Bells For John Whiteside's Daughter" is an elegy by John Crowe Ransom published in 1924. It was first collected in his 1924 anthology Chills and Fever, and is now considered his most-anthologized work. The five stanza poem reflects on the impact that unexpected death has on life by describing the death of a once lively young girl, once loud and energetic, but now silent. The reference to bells alludes to John Donne's "Devotions upon Emergent Occasions", which includes the lines, "never send to know for whom the bell tolls; It tolls for thee."
