= Amazon Literary Partnership =

Literary grant program

- Abbreviation: ALP
- Formation: 2009
- Type: Literary grant program
- Parent organization: Amazon

Amazon Literary Partnership (ALP) is a literary grant program operated by Amazon. Established in 2009, it awards grants to nonprofit literary organizations in the United States. A United Kingdom edition began in 2019 and was extended to the Republic of Ireland in 2024. In 2026, Publishers Weekly reported that the program had provided $18 million in grants to more than 150 organizations since its founding.

== History ==
In 2019, the program awarded $1 million to 66 literary nonprofits and separately provided $120,000 grants to the Academy of American Poets and the Community of Literary Magazines and Presses. In 2020, it again announced $1 million in grants to 66 organizations and also gave emergency funding to Artist Relief and the PEN America Writer's Emergency Fund during the COVID-19 pandemic.

A United Kingdom version of the program was introduced in 2019. In 2024, Publishing Perspectives reported that the British program had expanded to include the Republic of Ireland, while the United States program was awarding nearly $1 million to 93 organizations.

== Activities ==
The program awards grants to nonprofit literary organizations. It has also funded the National Book Foundation's 5 Under 35 program and the Best Translated Book Awards. Since 2019, some U.S. grants have been distributed through arrangements with the Academy of American Poets and the Community of Literary Magazines and Presses.
