= A Summons to Memphis =

1986 novel by Peter Taylor

- First edition
- Author: Peter Taylor
- Language: English
- Publisher: Alfred A Knopf
- Publication date: October 1986
- Publication place: United States
- Media type: Print (hardback & paperback)
- Pages: 224
- ISBN: 0-394-41062-9 (hardback edition); ISBN 0-345-34660-2 (paperback edition)
- OCLC: 13524488
- Dewey Decimal: 813/.54 19
- LC Class: PS3539.A9633 S8 1986

A Summons to Memphis is a 1986 novel by Peter Taylor that won the Pulitzer Prize for Fiction in 1987. It is the recollection of Phillip Carver, a middle aged editor from New York City, who is summoned back to Memphis by his two conniving unmarried sisters to help them prevent the marriage of their elderly father to a younger woman.

== Plot summary ==
As the story unfolds, Phillip reflects on the major incidents in the life of his once well-to-do family, which was forced to leave Nashville during the time of the Great Depression after the older Mr. Carver, a distinguished lawyer, lost a great deal of money in failed investments with his then-friend and business associate Lewis Shackleford. Though this happened when the four Carver children were still in their teens, they recall the event as a great betrayal. The resulting move had a major impact, affecting their abilities to build stable relationships and function as adults. Their lives were further dominated by their father as he ended romantic relationships for his children if he disapproved of them for any reason.

Ultimately, the oldest Carver son joined the army and died in World War II. Neither Phillip nor his sisters ever married. His sisters maintain an odd continued adolescence well into their fifties, dressing as though they were still attractive teenagers. Philip's two sisters never marry and live together partying like teens well into their midlives, while he moves to New York and lives with a younger woman, Holly, whom he will never marry. The "summons" to Memphis in the book's title refers to several events, but chiefly a call by Phillip's sisters to return and help them block their then-octogenarian father from remarrying after the death of their mother. This is a common type of marriage in Memphis, but ultimately the elder Mr. Carver is left at the altar in the end of the book.

The book is a rumination on the responsibilities of parents, friendships between men, the relationship between the "old" and "new" south, the nature of revenge and the possibility of forgiveness.

== Awards and nominations ==
- Won Pulitzer Prize for Fiction in 1987.
- Finalist for National Book Critics Circle Award for fiction in 1986.
