= Anne Halley =

German-born American writer

Marianne Halley Chametzky (November 9, 1928 – July 12, 2004), known professionally as Anne Halley, was a German-born American poet, editor, translator, and educator.

== Life ==
Ute Marianne Elisabeth Halle was born in Bremerhaven, Germany, on November 9, 1928. Her parents, Max Halle and Margarethe Kohlhepp, were both doctors. As the Nazis assumed power, Halley’s father – who was Jewish and thus forbidden to practice medicine – immigrated to the U.S. with her older brother, in 1936. They would be joined by Halley’s mother a year later, which left Anne and her twin sister, Renate, under the protection of their aunt, who enrolled the twins in the school where she taught. Finally, in 1938, Anne and Renate were able to move to the U.S., and the family settled in Olean, New York.

Halley attended Wellesley College, graduating in 1949 with a bachelor of arts degree. She earned a master's degree in English from the University of Minnesota in 1951.

In 1953, Halley married Jules Chametzky. In 1958, they moved to Amherst, Massachusetts, after Chametzky was offered a faculty position at the University of Massachusetts Amherst. They had three sons.

In 2004, at the age of 75, Anne Halley died from complications of multiple myeloma.

== Career ==
Halley first taught as a teaching assistant at the University of Minnesota before going on to teach at both UMass Amherst and Smith College as a part-time instructor and visiting lecturer; she was also an assistant professor at Holyoke Community College, where she was active in the anti-war in Vietnam protests. In addition, she taught intermittently in Germany at Frankfurt University and the Free University of Berlin.

A noted poet and feminist, Halley won a number of awards for both poetry and prose: the Wing Poetry Prize as an undergrad at Wellesley in 1948, the O.Henry Prize in 1976, a Massachusetts Artist Foundation Fellowship for poetry in 1980, and a National Endowment for the Arts Creative Writing Fellowship in 1982, for her story “The Kaiser’s Horses”. “The Kaiser’s Horses” was published by The Southern Review in 1980.

Halley published three collections of poetry: Between Wars & Other Poems (1965), which was originally published by noted sculptor and artist Leonard Baskin through his Gehenna Press in Northampton, MA, then by Oxford University Press in 1965 where it won an Oxford Summer Poetry Book Prize. "Between Wars" was then reissued by the University of Massachusetts Press. With UMass Press, she also published The Bearded Mother (1979) and Rumors of the Turning Wheel (2003), the former also being designed and illustrated by Baskin. Her poetry has been published in various outlets, “My Two Grandfathers” appeared in Saul Bellow’s The Noble Savage, and “The Village Hears that Gold is Unstable” in The New Republic. Halley also translated German satirist Kurt Tucholsky’s Deutschland Deutschland über Alles.

From 1977 to 2002, Halley served as the poetry editor of the Massachusetts Review. The Anne Halley Poetry Prize, co-sponsored by the Massachusetts Review and the English Department at UMass Amherst, is named in her honor.

== Published books ==
- Between Wars & Other Poems (University of Massachusetts Press, 1965)
- The Bearded Mother (University of Massachusetts Press, 1979)
- Rumors of the Turning Wheel (University of Massachusetts Press, 2003)
