= In the Miro District and Other Stories =

- First edition
- Author: Peter Taylor
- Genre: Short story collection
- Publisher: Alfred A. Knopf
- Publication date: 1977
- Media type: Print (hardback)
- Pages: 256
- ISBN: 978-0394410616

In the Miro District and Other Stories is a collection of short stories by Peter Taylor published in 1977 by Alfred A. Knopf.

The collection is notable in that none of the pieces had appeared in previous volumes, but were gleaned from periodicals of the 1960s and 70s. Four of these are "experimental" works from the mid-1970s, written in free verse: "The Instruction of the Mistress", "Three Heroines", "Her Need", and "The Hand of Emmagene", the later of which appeared in The Best American Short Stories 1976.

"Daphne's Lover" (1970) and "In the Miro District" (1978) also appeared in The Best American Short Stories.

== Stories ==
The original dates of publication and periodicals are indicated.

- "The Throughway" (Sewanee Review, Autumn 1964)
- "Daphne's Lover" (Sewanee Review, Spring 1969)
- "The Instruction of a Mistress" (New Review, September 1974)
- "The Hand of Emmagene" (Shenandoah, Winter 1975)
- "Three Heroines" (Virginia Quarterly Review, Spring 1975)
- "The Captain's Son" (The New Yorker, January 12, 1976)
- "Her Need" (Shenandoah, Summer 1976)
- "In the Miro District" (The New Yorker, February 7, 1977)

== Background to collection title ==
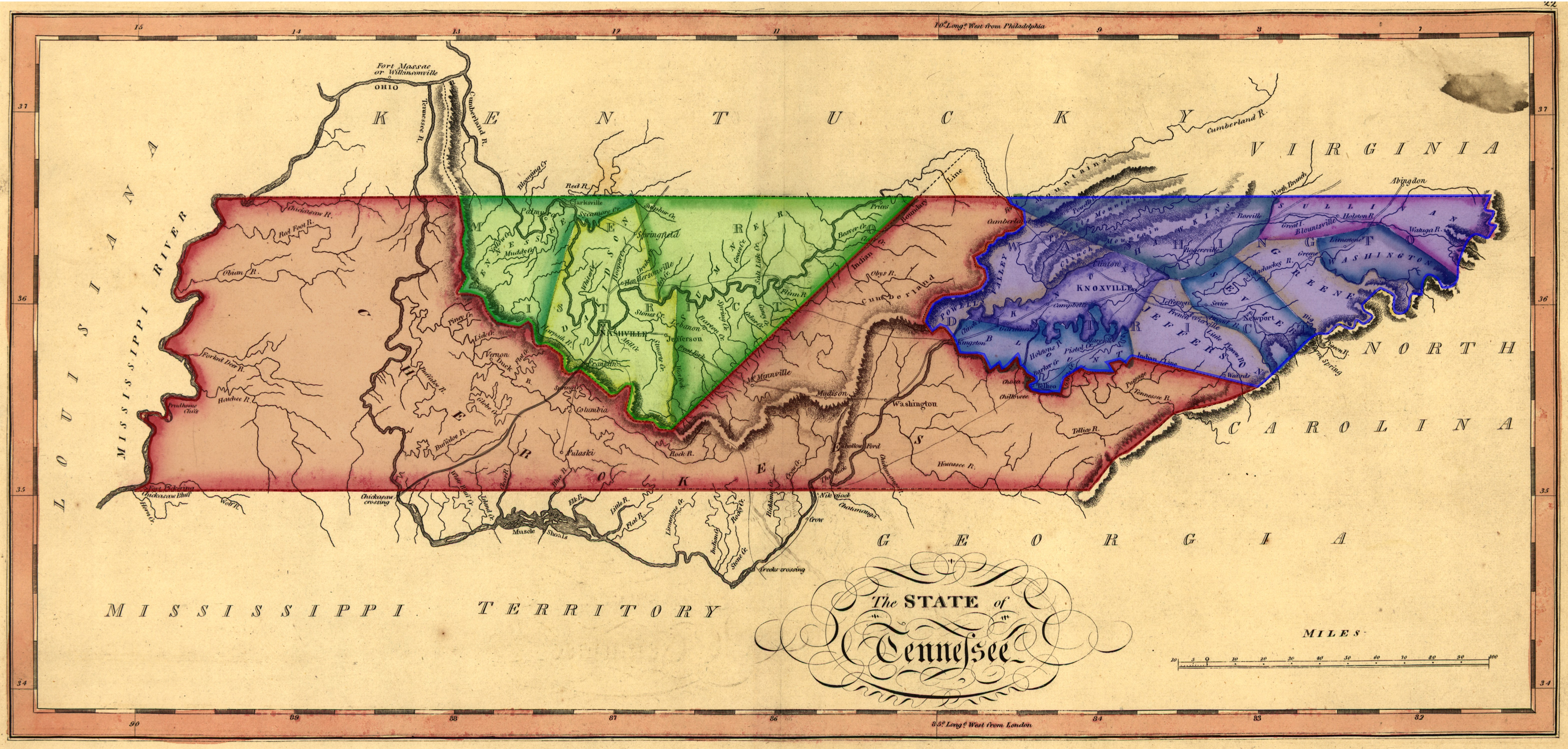
Shows state of Tennessee around 1810, emphasizing native land, Washington District, Mero District (in green).

The "Miro District" of the collection's title alludes to the archaic term for central Tennessee, in particular the area that now encompasses Nashville and surrounding counties.

"Miro" has its antecedents in Esteban Rodríguez Miró, the Spanish governor of Louisiana in the late 18th century. The North Carolina state legislature, which held jurisdiction over then territorial Tennessee in 1788, named the central region after Miro, who had assisted American patriots during the Revolutionary War, but misspelled the Spaniard's name as "Mero." The term "Mero District" had long been out of use when Peter Taylor revived it—restoring the correct spelling—to describe the setting for his fictional work.

Taylor's narrator in "In the Miro District" reports a disparaging remark by his 79-year-old grandfather—a Civil War veteran—concerning the fashionable section of Nashville and its status-conscious residents. The old man mockingly refers to the west side of the city as the Miro District "because he said only an antique Spanish name could do justice to the grandeur which Nashvillians claimed for themselves."

== Sources ==
- Beattie, Ann. "A Dream of a Writer". The American Scholar, Phi Beta Kappa publishing. September 5, 2017. Accessed 30 April, 2026.
- Carey, Bill. "Remembering the Mero District". Tennessee Magazine, August 7, 2025. Accessed 03 May, 2026.
- Casey, Jane Barnes. "A View of Peter Taylor's Stories". Virginia Quarterly Review 54, Spring 1978.
- Robison, James Curry. 1988. Peter Taylor: A Study of the Short Fiction. Twayne Publishers, Boston. G. K. Hall & Co., Gordon Weaver, General Editor. ISBN 0-8057-8303-2
- Sherrill, Charles A. "Mero District". Tennessee Encyclopedia. March 1, 2018. Accessed 04 May, 2026.
- Taylor, Peter. 1977. In the Miro District and Other Stories. Alfred A. Knopf, New York. ISBN 978-0394410616
