= William Phillips (editor) =

American editor (1907–2002)

William Phillips (November 14, 1907 – September 13, 2002) was an American editor, writer and public intellectual who co-founded Partisan Review. Together with co-editor Philip Rahv, Phillips made Partisan Review into one of the foremost journals of politics, literature, and the arts, particularly from the 1930s through the 1950s. In all, Phillips headed up the publication for six decades. He was the last surviving member of the first generation of The New York Intellectuals, which The Guardian described as "that brilliant and cantankerous group who 'argued the world' for decades."

== Life ==
Phillips was born in New York City. His parents were Jewish immigrants from Ukraine. Taken back to Russia from ages 1 to 4, he was raised in East Bronx. Phillips earned a B.A. from City College, which he called "the poor boy's steppingstone to the world." There he studied philosophy and came to admire the modernist movement in literature. He also took graduate literature courses and taught as an instructor at New York University.

In 1933, he married Edna Greenblatt, who worked as a high school teacher. She died in 1985. In 1995, Phillips married Edith Kurzweil, who ultimately succeeded him as editor of the magazine.

== Editorship of Partisan Review ==
As a young man, and up until the time of the Depression, Phillips was apolitical. Stirred by the new Marxist ideas, he turned to the Left; and in 1934 began attending meetings of the John Reed Club, a group of artists and writers associated with the international Communist movement. He rose to become the Club’s secretary although he never became a member of the Communist Party. He and Rahv originally launched Partisan Review in 1934, with an investment of $800, as an official publication of the Club. In 1936, Phillips and Rahv had an ideological falling out with the Club, and publication was briefly suspended. They relaunched the journal in December 1937, and it soon evolved into a leading anti-Stalinist voice on the left.

Rahv was often credited with being the more expansive thinker; Phillips called him a "manic impressive." But Phillips is generally regarded as having provided the editorial quality, stamina, and consistency that kept the publication alive for years, despite its modest circulation (never more than 15,000). Phillips enlisted a staff that included Mary McCarthy and Dwight Macdonald.

In the 1950s, Lillian Hellman complained that Phillips had not spearheaded the defense of intellectuals who were investigated by the House Un-American Activities Committee. The magazine had, in fact, editorialized against Joseph McCarthy. But Phillips also criticized writers and artists on the left who had been slow to recognize the Stalinist oppression of free expression and political dissent in the Soviet Union.

By the 1960s, Rahv had scaled back his participation in the day-to-day work of editing the journal. However, when the board of directors opted to list Phillips as editor-in-chief, Rahv sued and won the right to continue to see all submissions. In 1969, Rahv resigned to start his own journal, and Phillips gained principal editorial control of Partisan Review, which he maintained until shortly before his death.

== Coordinating Council of Literary Magazines (CCLM) ==
In 1967 he co-founded the Community of Literary Magazines and Presses together with Reed Whittemore (The Carleton Miscellany, The New Republic); Jules Chametzky (The Massachusetts Review); George Plimpton (The Paris Review); and Robie Macauley (Playboy).
