= James Thackara =

British-American writer (born 1944)

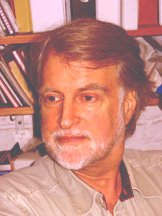
- James Thackara 2009
- Born: December 7, 1944 (age 81); Los Angeles, California, U.S.
- Occupation: Writer
- Writing career
- Genre: Novel fiction
- Notable works: America's Children, Ahab's Daughter, The Book of Kings

James Thackara (born 7 December 1944, in Los Angeles) is an American writer who has lived in the United Kingdom since 1971 and became a British citizen in 2007. He has published three novels – America's Children (1984), Ahab's Daughter (1989), and The Book of Kings (1999).

== Early life ==
Thackara was born in Los Angeles, California to Argentinean-born James Justin Thackara and Ellen Louise Schmid from Greenville, Texas. His parents' marriage broke down before Thackara's birth and thereafter, his mother travelled with her young son through Europe and the Americas. At the age of eleven, he was sent to the first of several boarding schools. While studying at Harvard University, Thackara was mentored by Peter Taylor, resulting in a close personal friendship that lasted till the end of Taylor's life.

== Writing ==
Thackara explored the making of the first atomic bomb in his first published novel, America's Children. A lightly fictionalised biography of Robert Oppenheimer, it was purchased in 1984 by Chatto and Windus. The commercial success of The Book of Kings caused America's Children to be republished in Britain after 19 years, and for it to be published in the US for the first time in 2002. In one of the book's first reviews, The Economist praised the "trenchant novel"...for "depicting the drama of Oppenheimer torn between lust for scientific achievement and horror of prospective success."

Ahab's Daughter was published by Abacus in 1989.

The Book of Kings, published by Overlook Press in 1999, had taken Thackara more than 20 years to complete. A chronicle of World War II evoking the 19th-century style of the "great novel", it attracted praise for its moral vision, scale, – and writing in such "elaborately and burnished scenes...as a schooner setting sail, the discovery of a wrecked plane and frequently commended military action scenes. It also received criticism for its writing style, in particular, the dialogue, with characters "speaking in the tones of an oracle", its length and the use of multiple foreign languages. The Chicago Tribune called the book "an audacious undertaking in the ...breadth of its unfolding... [he] writes in the mode of the sublime romanticist..." The San Diego Union Tribune said "the writer... sweeps us up into it with the passion of a great storyteller whose subject is not merely a particular cast of characters but a world in agonizing transition" The New York Times viewed the novel as "melodrama", "with swaths of very good writing and quite a bit that is dreadful". Kirkus Reviews described the book as marked by both an "undeniable if fitful power" and "infuriating awkwardness." A strong tribute was delivered by Malcolm Bradbury in The Times when he said of the book "it revives the form's classic power to chronicle history and society, manners, morals, politics, family dynasties and human anxieties, to move from individual to general, from the intense emotions of daily living to the sweeping forces of the world" The Observer issued a famously scathing review (later reprinted in The Guardian) by Philip Hensher, calling it "so awful, it's not even funny. There is not one decent sentence in the book, nothing but falsity and a useless sincerity. It may be the very worst novel I have read", and ending with the comment that Thackara "could not write 'Bum' on a wall." The Economist on the other hand praised the writing, stating that Thackara had Tolstoy's "talent for painting the grand with small brush strokes", and the Seattle Times too drew parallels with War and Peace, calling The Book of Kings a "book nobody should miss reading [...] Thackara's acknowledged success is the consummate ability to gracefully mesh the personal with the political, the sense of the individual with the historical."
