= John Crowe Ransom =

American writer and literary critic

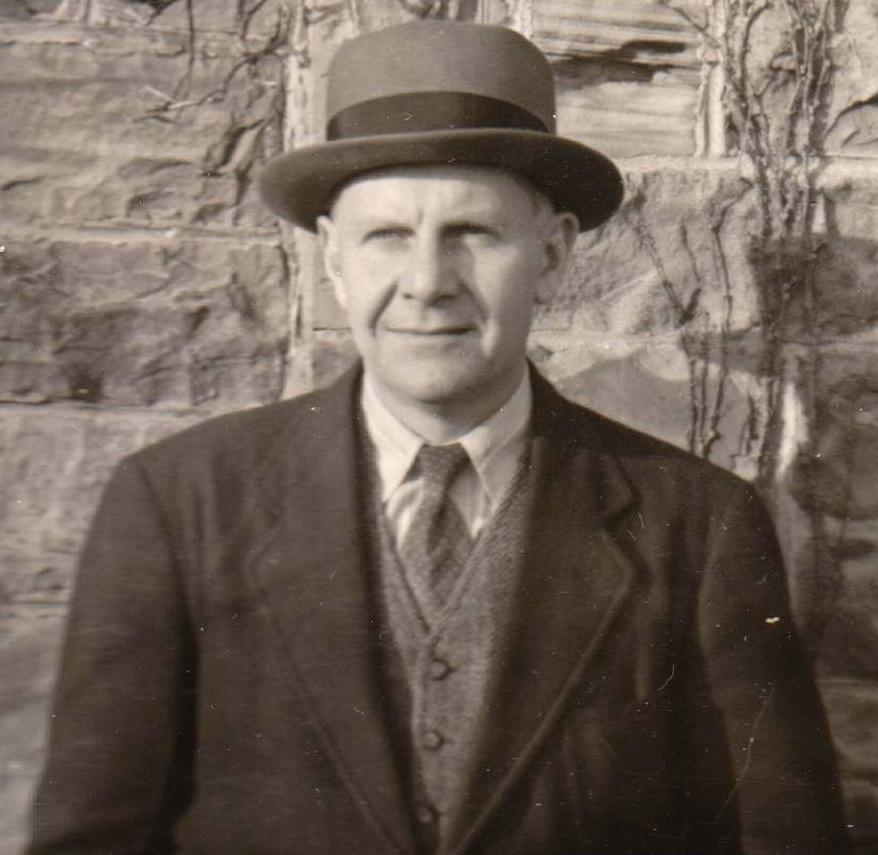
- John Crowe Ransom at Kenyon College in 1941. Photo by Robie Macauley.
- Born: April 30, 1888; Pulaski, Tennessee, US
- Died: July 3, 1974 (aged 86); Gambier, Ohio, US
- Resting place: Kenyon College Cemetery, Gambier, Ohio
- Education: Vanderbilt University (B.A.); Christ Church, Oxford (M.A.)
- Occupations: Educator; scholar; literary critic; poet; essayist
- Employer: Kenyon College
- Known for: New Criticism school of literary criticism
- Partner: Robb Reavill
- Awards: Rhodes Scholarship, Bollingen Prize for Poetry, National Book Award

John Crowe Ransom (April 30, 1888 – July 3, 1974) was an American educator, scholar, literary critic, poet, essayist and editor. He is considered to be a founder of the New Criticism school of literary criticism. As a faculty member at Kenyon College, he was the first editor of the widely regarded Kenyon Review. Highly respected as a teacher and mentor to a generation of accomplished students, he also was a prize-winning poet and essayist. He was nominated for the 1973 Nobel Prize in Literature.

== Background ==
John Crowe Ransom was born on April 30, 1888, in Pulaski, Tennessee. His father, John James Ransom (1853–1934) was a Methodist minister. His mother was Sara Ella (Crowe) Ransom (1859–1947). He had two sisters, Annie Phillips and Ella Irene, and one brother, Richard. He grew up in Spring Hill, Franklin, Springfield, and Nashville, Tennessee. He was home schooled until age ten. From 1899 to 1903, he attended the Bowen School, a public school whose headmaster was Vanderbilt alumnus Angus Gordon Bowen.

He entered Vanderbilt University in Nashville at the age of fifteen, graduating first in his class in 1909. His philosophy professor was Collins Denny, later a Bishop of the Methodist Episcopal Church, South. Ransom interrupted his studies for two years to teach sixth and seventh grades at the Taylorsville High School in Taylorsville, Mississippi, followed by teaching Latin and Greek at the Haynes-McLean School in Lewisburg, Tennessee. After teaching one more year in Lewisburg, he was selected as a Rhodes Scholar. He attended Christ Church, Oxford, from 1910 to 1913, where he read Greats, taking a second class degree.

John Crowe Ransom with Robie Macauley (left) at the Kenyon Review in 1959. Photo by Thomas Greenslade.

== Career ==
Ransom taught Latin for one year at the Hotchkiss School alongside Samuel Claggett Chew (1888–1960). He was then appointed to the English department at Vanderbilt University in 1914. During the First World War, he served as an artillery officer in France. After the war, he returned to Vanderbilt. He was a founding member of the Fugitives, a Southern literary group of sixteen writers that functioned primarily as a kind of poetry workshop and included Donald Davidson, Allen Tate, and Robert Penn Warren. Under their influence, Ransom, whose first interest had been philosophy (specifically John Dewey and American pragmatism) began writing poetry. His first volume of poems, Poems about God (1919), was praised by Robert Frost and Robert Graves. The Fugitive Group had a special interest in Modernist poetry and, under Ransom's editorship, started a short-lived but highly influential magazine, called The Fugitive, which published American Modernist poets, mainly from the South (though they also published Northerners like Hart Crane). Out of all the Fugitive poets, Norton poetry editors Richard Ellmann and Robert O'Clair opined that, "[Ransom's poems were] among the most remarkable," characterizing his poetry as "quirky" and "at times eccentric."

In 1930, alongside eleven other Southern Agrarians, he published the conservative, Agrarian manifesto I'll Take My Stand: The South and the Agrarian Tradition, which assailed the tide of industrialism that appeared to be sweeping away traditional Southern culture. The Agrarians believed that the Southern tradition, rooted in the pre-Civil War agricultural model, was the answer to the South's economic and cultural problems. His contribution to I'll Take My Stand is his essay Reconstructed but Unregenerate which starts the book and lays out the Southern Agrarians' basic argument. In various essays influenced by his Agrarian beliefs, Ransom defended the manifesto's assertion that modern industrial capitalism was a dehumanizing force that the South should reject in favor of an agrarian economic model. However, by the late 1930s he began to distance himself from the movement, and in 1945, he publicly criticized it. He remained an active essayist until his death even though, by the 1970s, the popularity and influence of the New Critics had seriously diminished.

In 1937, he accepted a position at Kenyon College in Gambier, Ohio. He was the founding editor of the Kenyon Review, and continued as editor until his retirement in 1959. In 1966, he was elected to the American Academy of Arts and Letters.

He has few peers among twentieth-century American university teachers of humanities; his distinguished students included Donald Davidson, Randall Jarrell, George Lanning, Robert Lowell, Andrew Lytle, Allen Tate, Peter Taylor, Robie Macauley, Robert Penn Warren, E.L. Doctorow, Cleanth Brooks, Richard M. Weaver, James Wright, and C. A. Patrides. His literary reputation is based chiefly on two collections of poetry, Chills and Fever (1924) and Two Gentlemen in Bonds (1927). Believing he had no new themes upon which to write, his subsequent poetic activity consisted almost entirely of revising ("tinkering", he called it) his earlier poems. Hence Ransom's reputation as a poet is based on the fewer than 160 poems he wrote and published between 1916 and 1927. In 1963, the poet/critic and former Ransom student Randall Jarrell published an essay in which he highly praised Ransom's poetry:

In John Crowe Ransom's best poems every part is subordinated to the whole, and the whole is accomplished with astonishing exactness and thoroughness. Their economy, precision, and restraint gives the poems, sometimes, an original yet impersonal perfection . . . And sometimes their phrasing is magical—light as air, soft as dew, the real old-fashioned enchantment. The poems satisfy our nostalgia for the past, yet themselves have none. They are reports . . . of our world's old war between power and love, between those who efficiently and practically know and those who are "content to feel/ What others understand." And these reports of battles are, somehow, bewitching . . . Ransom's poems profess their limitations so candidly, almost as a principle of style, that it is hardly necessary to say they are not poems of the largest scope or the greatest intensity. But they are some of the most original poems ever written, just as Ransom is one of the best, most original, and most sympathetic poets alive; it is easy to see that his poetry will always be cared for, since he has written poems that are perfectly realized and occasionally almost perfect."

Despite the brevity of his poetic career and output, Ransom won the Bollingen Prize for Poetry in 1951. His 1963 Selected Poems received the National Book Award the following year.

He primarily wrote short poems examining the ironic and unsentimental nature of life (with domestic life in the American South being a major theme). An example of his Southern style is his poem "Janet Waking", which "mixes modernist with old-fashioned country rhetoric." He was noted as a strict formalist, using both regular rhyme and meter in almost all of his poems. He also occasionally employed archaic diction. Ellman and O'Clair note that "[Ransom] defends formalism because he sees in it a check on bluntness, on brutality. Without formalism, he insists, poets simply rape or murder their subjects."

He was a leading figure of the school of literary criticism known as the New Criticism, which gained its name from his 1941 volume of essays The New Criticism. The New Critical theory, which dominated American literary thought throughout the middle 20th century, emphasized close reading, and criticism based on the texts themselves rather than on non-textual bias or non-textual history. In his seminal 1937 essay, "Criticism, Inc." Ransom laid out his ideal form of literary criticism stating that, "criticism must become more scientific, or precise and systematic." To this end, he argued that personal responses to literature, historical scholarship, linguistic scholarship, and what he termed "moral studies" should not influence literary criticism. He also argued that literary critics should regard a poem as an aesthetic object. Many of the ideas he explained in this essay would become very important in the development of The New Criticism. "Criticism, Inc." and a number of Ransom's other theoretical essays set forth some of the guiding principles that the New Critics would build upon. Still, his former students, specifically Allen Tate, Cleanth Brooks, and Robert Penn Warren, had a greater hand in developing many of the key concepts (like "close reading") that later came to define the New Criticism.

In 1951, he was awarded the Russell Loines Award for Poetry from the National Institute of Arts and Letters.

== Personal life and death ==
In 1920, he married Robb Reavill, a well-educated young woman who shared his interest in sports and games. Together they raised three children: a daughter, Helen, and two sons, David and John.

Ransom died on July 3, 1974, in Gambier at the age of eighty-six. He was buried at the Kenyon College Cemetery in Gambier.

== Bibliography ==
=== Literary criticism ===
- The World's Body. (C. Scribner's Sons, Ltd., 1938.)
- The New Criticism. (New Directions, 1941).
- God without thunder: an unorthodox defense of orthodoxy (Archon Books, 1965).

=== Poetry collections ===
- Poems About God (Henry Holt & Co., 1919).
- Chills and Fever (A.A. Knopf, 1924).
  - Includes "Bells for John Whiteside's Daughter"
- Grace after Meat (1924).
- Two Gentlemen in Bonds (Knopf, 1927).
- Selected Poems (Knopf, 1963)

=== Anthologies ===
- The Poetry of 1900-1950 (1951).
- The Past Half-century in Literature: A Symposium (National Council of English Teachers, 1952).
- Poems and Essays (Random House, 1965).
- Beating the bushes: selected essays, 1941-1970 (New Directors, 1972).

=== Textbook ===
- A College Primer of Writing (H.Holt and Company, 1943).
