= Eleanor Ross Taylor =

American poet (1920–2011)

- Copyright: Jill Krementz
- Born: Eleanor Ross; June 30, 1920; Norwood, North Carolina
- Died: December 30, 2011 (aged 91); Falls Church, Virginia
- Education: University of North Carolina at Greensboro
- Occupation: Poet
- Spouse: Peter Taylor (1943–1994)
- Writing career
- Period: 1960–2011
- Notable awards: Ruth Lilly Poetry Prize

Eleanor Ross Taylor (June 30, 1920 – December 30, 2011) was an American poet who published six collections of verse from 1960 to 2009. Her work received little recognition until 1998, but thereafter received several major poetry prizes. Describing her most recent poetry collection, Kevin Prufer writes, "I cannot imagine the serious reader — poet or not — who could leave Captive Voices unmoved by the work of this supremely gifted poet who skips so nimbly around our sadnesses and fears, never directly addressing them, suggesting, instead, their complex resistance to summary."

== Biography ==
Eleanor Ross was born in rural North Carolina in 1920. She enrolled at the Woman's College of the University of North Carolina, now the University of North Carolina at Greensboro, where she studied with the poet Allen Tate and novelist Caroline Gordon. She graduated in 1940, and worked for a time as a high school English teacher. With the recommendation from Allen Tate, she was admitted to Vanderbilt University for master's work with Donald Davidson. There in 1943 she met Peter Taylor, whom she married after a six-week courtship, having broken off her engagement to another man. Panthea Reid has written of their marriage,

Like most women of her generation, Eleanor Ross assumed that marriage and a career were incompatible. Despite precocious beginnings, therefore, Eleanor Ross largely ceased to write when she married the major short story writer and novelist, Peter Taylor. Perhaps she did not want to compete with her husband; certainly she was too busy to follow a dedicated writing regime. She served as wife, mother, housekeeper, hostess, letter-writer, and also family packer, as Peter Taylor nomadically moved from one to another writer-in-residence post.

== Poetry ==
In the 1950s, Peter Taylor was teaching at the University of North Carolina at Greensboro, along with the poet Randall Jarrell. Eleanor Taylor had been writing poems for some time, and Jarrell became her critic and sponsor. In 1960, her first poetry collection, A Wilderness of Ladies, was published; Panthea Reid has speculated that Jarrell "probably was behind the publication of Eleanor Taylor's first collection of poems", and Jarrell wrote an appreciative introduction for the volume. This first volume received a middling review from Geoffrey Hartman, who wrote,

That every poem is like to every other is not a fault, at least not in this volume. It is the price Mrs. Taylor pays for achieving a style with her first book. There is, miraculously, no pastiche. The fault I do find is related to her wish to write directly from the middle of other minds.

In 1972, her second book of poetry, Welcome Eumenides, was published by George Braziller, Inc.; Richard Howard, a poet who was then editing the Braziller poetry series, wrote a foreword for the volume. In her New York Times review, the poet Adrienne Rich commented that, "What I find compelling in the poems of Eleanor Taylor, besides the authority and originality of her language, is the underlying sense of how the conflicts of imaginative and intelligent women have driven them on, lashed them into genius or madness, ...".

Taylor's third collection, New and Selected Poems (1983), was published by a small press run by Stuart T. Wright, and apparently received very little distribution. Her next collection, Days Going, Days Coming Back (1991), was chosen by Dave Smith for the University of Utah Press poetry series. In his review of this volume, Richard Howard summarized Taylor's poetry,

Eleanor Ross Taylor devised, in her startling first poems over thirty years ago, and practices still, for all the modesty of her address, a tough modernist poetics of fragmentation and erasure, the verse rarely indulging in recurrent pattern or recognizable figure, the lines usually short and sharp in their resonance, gists and surds of a discourse allusive to the songs and sayings of a largely southern community dispersed among Virginia, North Carolina, Tennessee, and Florida and readiest (or at least, most eloquent) to speak in the tongues of remembered or imagined Others."

Dave Smith subsequently selected both of Taylor's ensuing collections, Late Leisure: Poems (1999) and Captive Voices: New and Selected Poems, 1960–2008 (2009), for the "Southern Messenger" poetry series of the Louisiana State University Press.

=== Affinities and influences ===
Taylor's originality has been emphasized by several critics writing of her work; thus Lynn Emanuel writes of Captive Voices, "It is a complex and unexpected convergence of the influences of modernism and a wholly original, native genius. Reading it one suddenly realizes that one is in the presence of an American classic." In a 2002 interview with Taylor, Susan Settlemyre Williams proposed Emily Dickinson, Marianne Moore, and Elizabeth Bishop as possible influences, but Taylor herself acknowledged Edna St. Vincent Millay as the poet she had read enthusiastically as a student, and who had "made me feel that poetry was contemporary and could relate to me right now, in the way that you know that all those wonderful heroines of poetry and heroes do, ...".

=== Taylor's "southernness" ===
Erika Howsare discerns a regional quality to Taylor's verse. She associates Taylor with "a literary circle that includes figures such as Randall Jarrell, Robert Lowell, and Robert Penn Warren" and writes, "The southernness of her background makes her tend to rein in her formidable intellect and biting wit with an uneasy deference to form and convention. This tension may be witnessed in her use of both metrical and nonmetrical lines. Just when the organization of her poems seems on the verge of wavering, she returns to the restraint with which most of them begin."

Eric Gudas writes, "The importance of region in Taylor's work simply cannot be overstated. These poems are grounded in the consciousness of a woman whose familiarity with Southern history, culture, and landscape is profound." Gudas discerns a tension that "has everything to do with the history of white women in the male-dominated, white supremacist South; and it is embodied in the music and rhythms of the poems, wherein a restrained, almost genteel tone is shot through with "a passion always threatening to go undisciplined with the characteristic intensity of her native South" (in the aptly worded jacket copy of her last book)." He illustrates his point with a close reading of Taylor's poem, "Retired Pilot Watches Plane":

...the speaker observes her suburban neighbor on an early morning dog-walk "…stopped / midstreet looking up / The early NY flight / slowing for coming in:"

His head
turning with the plane a maze
of speeds and altitudes?
controls he is unleashing
there in the cockpit?
Half dizzy
I come down to
my yard yews my late
husband planted East and color
raying far no line between
earth's atmosphere
black space no oxygen

=== Critical studies ===
Jean Valentine edited a collection of essays about Taylor's poetry that was published in 2001. Eric Gudas has written a doctoral dissertation about Taylor's life and poetry.

== Awards ==
In 1998, she was awarded the Shelley Memorial Award by the Poetry Society of America, which honors one or two poets each year "with reference to genius and need". She received the 2000 Aiken Taylor Award for Modern American Poetry, which honors a "substantial and distinguished career". In 2009, she was elected to the Fellowship of Southern Writers and was awarded the Carole Weinstein Poetry Prize. In March 2010, her volume Captive Voices: New and Selected Poems, 1960–2008 received the William Carlos Williams Award for the year's best volume of poetry from a small or a university press. On April 13, 2010 the Poetry Foundation announced that Taylor would receive the 2010 Ruth Lilly Poetry Prize, which honors poets whose "lifetime accomplishments warrant extraordinary recognition"; the prize was $100,000.

== Family ==
Eleanor and Peter Taylor had two children, Katherine Baird (b. 1947) and Peter Ross (b. 1955). Peter Taylor died in 1994. Peter Ross Taylor is a poet himself; Katherine Baird Taylor died in 2001. After many years living in Charlottesville, Virginia, Eleanor Ross Taylor last resided in Falls Church, Virginia.

== Poetry collections ==
- Taylor, Eleanor Ross; Jarrell, Randall (1960). Wilderness of Ladies. New York: McDowell, Obolensky.
- Taylor, Eleanor Ross; Howard, Richard (1972). Welcome Eumenides. George Braziller. ISBN 978-0-8076-0633-9.
- Taylor, Eleanor Ross (1983). New and Selected Poems. Winston-Salem: Stuart Wright Publishers. ISBN 978-0-913773-02-4.
- Taylor, Eleanor Ross (1991). Days Going/Days Coming Back. University of Utah Press. ISBN 978-0-87480-364-8.
- Taylor, Eleanor Ross (1999). Late Leisure: Poems. Louisiana State University Press. ISBN 978-0-8071-2355-3.
- Taylor, Eleanor Ross; Voigt, Ellen Bryant (2009). Captive Voices: New and Selected Poems, 1960–2008. Louisiana State University Press. ISBN 978-0-8071-3412-2.
