= Happy Families Are All Alike: A Collection of Stories =

- First edition
- Author: Peter Taylor
- Genre: Short story collection
- Publisher: McDowell, Obolensky
- Publication date: 1959
- Media type: Print (hardback)
- Pages: 305
- ISBN: 978-0839210450

Happy Families Are All Alike: A Collection of Stories is a collection of short stories by Peter Taylor published in 1959 by McDowell and Obolensky.

Taylor never wrote a story with the title "Happy Families Are All Alike". Rather, it derives thematically from the opening sentence of Russian novelist Leo Tolstoy's Anna Karenina (1878).

Happy families are all alike; every unhappy family is unhappy in its own way.

"Venus, Cupid, Folly and Time" won the O. Henry Award and appeared in The Best American Short Stories 1959.

== Stories ==
The original dates of publication and periodicals are indicated.

- "1939" (The New Yorker, March 12, 1955, as "A Sentimental Journey")
- "The Other Times" (The New Yorker, February 23, 1957)
- "Promise of Rain' (The New Yorker, January 25, 1958, as "The Unforgivable")
- "Venus, Cupid, Folly and Time" (The Kenyon Review, Spring 1958)
- "Je Suis Perdu" (The New Yorker, June 7, 1958, as "A Pair of Bright Blue Eyes")
- "The Little Cousins" (The New Yorker, April 25, 1959, as "Cousins, Family Love, Family Life, All That")
- "A Friend and Protector" (The Kenyon Review, Summer 1959, as "Who Was Jesse's Friend and Protector")
- "Heads of Houses" (The New Yorker, September 12, 1959)
- "Guests" (The New Yorker, October 3, 1959)

== Sources ==
- Robison, James Curry. 1988. Peter Taylor: A Study of the Short Fiction. Twayne Publishers, Boston. G. K. Hall & Co., Gordon Weaver, General Editor. ISBN 0-8057-8303-2
- Tolstoy, Leo. 1878. Anna Karenina. THE PROJECT GUTENBERG EBOOK 1399. https://www.gutenberg.org/files/1399/1399-h/1399-h.htm Accessed 30 April, 2026.
- Taylor, Peter. 1959. Happy Families Are All Alike: A Collection of Stories. McDowell, Obolensky, New York. ISBN 978-0839210450
- Taylor, Peter. 2009. The Collected Stories of Peter Taylor. Farrar, Straus and Giroux, New York. ISBN 978-0-374-53184-3 (paperback edition).
