= Mona Kareem =

Writer, translator and literary scholar

- منى كريم
- Education: American University of Kuwait; Binghamton University
- Occupations: Writer, translator, and literary scholar
- Employer: Washington University in St. Louis

Mona Kareem (Arabic: منى كريم; born 1987) is an Arab-American writer, translator, and literary scholar, as well as an advocate for migrant rights. Born in Kuwait to a stateless, or Bedoon, family, the theme of statelessness is prevalent in her literary work.

== Education and career ==
Due to Kareem's stateless legal status, she could not attend a public university. Her academic history and poetic prowess earned her a scholarship from a charitable family in Kuwait. Kareem studied at the American University of Kuwait.

Kareem received a scholarship from Binghamton University in 2011. She moved to the US and obtained a doctoral degree in Comparative Literature. Her thesis, titled "Good Mothers, Bad Sisters: Arab Women Writers in the Nation,” explored subalternity in the Arab literary scene.

Kareem worked as a visiting scholar at Tufts University and the University of Maryland, College Park. She has held fellowships from the National Endowment for the Arts, the Zora Neale Hurston Fellowship at Bard College, Poetry International Web, Arab American National Museum, Banff Centre for Arts and Creativity and National Centre for Writing. She served as translator-in-residence at Princeton University, and currently serves as assistant professor in the Arts and Sciences at Washington University in St. Louis.

As a literary scholar, Kareem's research interests range from Arabic poetry and prose, contemporary feminist fiction, and literary translation strategies to subaltern subjectivities.

Having faced discrimination as a Bedoon, Kareem established Bedoon Rights, an online reference dedicated to raising awareness on the prejudice and struggles the stateless face in Kuwait.

Kareem was denied entry to Kuwait at Kuwait International Airport when she flew there to see her family in 2023. Kareem told the Associated Press that Kuwaiti authorities informed her that she risked imprisonment if she remained in the country. She had previously been questioned about Bedoon-related activism and pledged not to have political discussions.

== Works ==
=== Poetry ===
Kareem's poetry is characterized by the use of simple language and vivid imagery. It is frequently arranged in short lines. Themes often deal with feminism and identity, especially as a migrant, and push beyond liberal feminist and colonial frameworks to examine structural violence of the nation-state.

At 14 years old, Kareem published her first poetry collection, Arabic: نهارات مغسولة بماء العطش, romanized: Naharaat maghsūla bi Ma-e el ’atash, lit. 'Mornings Washed by Thirst's Water'. Two years later, she released her second anthology Arabic: غياب بأصابعي مبذورة, romanized: Ghiyab bi asabi’ mabthūra, lit. 'Absence with Amputated Fingers'. Kareem published Ma anamū min adjlihi el yaum in 2016. In 2019, she released trilingual poetry collection Femme Ghosts. Her books have been translated to nine languages.

=== Translation ===
Kareem translated the novel Kindred by Octavia Butler and some poems of Alejandra Pizarnik into Arabic. She translated Instructions Within by Ashraf Fayadh (2017) into English; it was nominated for Best Translated Book Award.
