= A Long Fourth and Other Stories =

1948 book by Peter Taylor

- First edition
- Author: Peter Taylor
- Genre: Short story collection
- Publisher: Harcourt
- Publication date: 1948
- Media type: Print (hardback)
- Pages: 166
- OCLC: 30069097

A Long Fourth and Other Stories is a collection of short stories by Peter Taylor published in 1948 by Harcourt Brace Jovanich.

Three of the stories in the collection were included in The Best American Short Stories: "The Fancy Woman", "Rain in the Heart", and "The Scout Master".

== Stories ==
The original periodical and date of publication are indicated.

- "A Spinster's Tale" (Southern Review, Autumn 1940)
- "Skyline" (Southern Review, Winter 1941)
- "The Fancy Woman" (Summer 1941)
- "Rain in the Heart" (Sewanee Review, Winter 1945)
- "The Scoutmaster" (Partisan Review, Summer 1945 [originally "The Scout Master"])
- "A Long Fourth" (Sewanee Review, Summer 1946)
- "Allegiance" (The Kenyon Review, Spring 1947)

== Background ==
Taylor's first published work appeared in the small Mississippi journal River (spelled in lower case, "river," by its original publishers), two stories that Robert Penn Warren, editor at Louisiana State University's Southern Review, had declined to publish. "A Spinster's Tale"—"Taylor's first story of lasting value"—was published in the summer 1941 edition of the LSU journal.

== Reception ==
When A Long Fourth and Other Stories appeared in 1948, Taylor had already enjoyed the support of a "small but prestigious readership," including that of mentor and editor Robert Penn Warren.

With its laudatory Introduction provided by Warren, Taylor's short fiction became widely known and admired by a number of mainstream literary critics.

Critic Ashley Brown writing in The Sewanee Review declared "A Long Fourth was one of the best collections of short fiction which appeared during the forties."

=== Narrative voice ===
Critic William Peden characterizes Peter Taylor's male narrative persona as "urbane, witty, sophisticated, nostalgic" and "very much like Taylor himself"—conferring confidences upon members of his own upper-middle-class. Author Joyce Carol Oates observes: "Taylor's writing is always impeccable; he is a gentleman confiding in another gentleman."

Critic Robert Towers commented on the restrained voice of Taylor's male narrators:

Mr. Taylor avoids the melodrama and extreme situations that we associate with writers like William Faulkner or Flannery O'Connor. His fiction could hardly be less Gothic or rhetorical. Death takes place offstage; where sex is concerned, bedroom doors are kept firmly closed. He is very much an artist of the normal, who finds sufficient drama in the crises and perturbations that affect even the best-regulated families.

== Theme ==
"Peter Taylor has a disenchanted mind. In terms of his very disenchantment, however, he has succumbed to the last and most fatal enchantment: the enchantment of veracity. And that is what, in the end, makes the artist free."—Literary critic Robert Penn Warren, Introduction to A Long Fourth and Other Stories.

William Peden writes that the collection is "concerned with family relationships in respectable, urban, middle or upper middle class Tennessee." Robert Penn Warren identifies Taylor's key thematic concern in A Long Fourth:

Peter Taylor's stories are officially about contemporary, urban, middle-class world of the upper South, and he is the only writer who has taken this as his province...the old-fashioned structure of family still persists, disintegrating slowly under the pressure of modernity..."

== Sources ==
- Beattie, Ann. 2017. "A Dream of a Writer" The American Scholar, Phi Beta Kappa publishing. September 5, 2017. Accessed 30 April, 2026.
- Brown, Ashley. 1962. "The Early Fiction of Peter Taylor." The Sewanee Review, Autumn, 1962. Vol. 70, No. 4. pp. 588-602. https://www.jstor.org/stable/27540816 Accessed 16 April, 2026.
- Oates, Joyce Carol. 1971. "Reaction of Distance, Realism of Immediacy." Southern Review, Winter 1971. p. P. 295-301 in Peter Taylor: A Study of the Short Fiction. Twanye Publishers, Boston. G. K. Hall & Co., Gordon Weaver, General Editor. ISBN 0-8057-8303-2
- Peden, William. 1970. "A Hard and Admirable Toughness: The Stories of Peter Taylor." The Hollin's Critic 7, no. 1, February 1970. pp. 1-9. Peter Taylor: A Study of the Short Fiction. 1988. Twanye Publishers, Boston. G. K. Hall & Co., Gordon Weaver, General Editor. ISBN 0-8057-8303-2
- Robison, James Curry. 1988. Peter Taylor: A Study of the Short Fiction. Twanye Publishers, Boston. G. K. Hall & Co., Gordon Weaver, General Editor. ISBN 0-8057-8303-2
- Taylor, Peter. 1948. A Long Fourth and Other Stories. Harcourt Brace Jovanich, New York. OCLC 30069097
- Taylor, Peter. 2009. The Collected Stories of Peter Taylor. Farrar, Straus and Giroux, New York. ISBN 978-0-374-53184-3 (paperback edition).
- Towers, Robert. 1985. "A Master of the Miniature Novel." New York Times, February 17, 1985. https://archive.nytimes.com/www.nytimes.com/books/98/12/06/specials/taylor-forest.html Accessed 14 April, 2026.
- Warren, Robert Penn. 1948. Introduction to The Long Fourth and Other Stories. pp. viii-x. Harcourt Brace Jovanich, New York. OCLC 30069097 Peter Taylor: A Study of the Short Fiction. P. 150-151. Twanye Publishers, Boston. G. K. Hall & Co., Gordon Weaver, General Editor. ISBN 0-8057-8303-2
