= Peter Taylor (writer) =

American author (1917–1994)

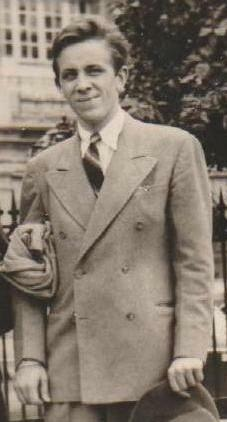
Taylor in 1941

Matthew Hillsman Taylor Jr. (January 8, 1917 – November 2, 1994), known professionally as Peter Taylor, was an American novelist, short story writer, and playwright. Born and raised in Tennessee and St. Louis, Missouri, he wrote frequently about the urban South in his stories and novels.

== Early life and education ==
Taylor was born in Trenton, Tennessee, to Matthew Hillsman "Red" Taylor, a prominent attorney who played football at Vanderbilt University in 1904 and 1905, and Katherine Baird (Taylor) Taylor. His father was named after Matthew Hillsman, a long-time local Baptist pastor. His father's father, Colonel Robert Zachary Taylor, had fought for the Confederate Army as a private under Nathan Bedford Forrest. When working in 1908 as an attorney for the West Tennessee Land Company, which had bought interests in property at Reelfoot Lake, he was kidnapped with attorney Quentin Rankin in October and shot by night riders, who were harassing and intimidating people associated with the company. Initially reported as killed, Taylor escaped by swimming across the lake. Rankin was shot and hanged the same night.

His mother's father was Robert Love Taylor, a politician and writer from eastern Tennessee who served one term as a US Congressman, and three two-year terms as governor of Tennessee in the 19th century, and as United States Senator from Tennessee from 1907 until his death in 1912.

During his early childhood, Taylor lived with his family in Nashville. The family moved to St. Louis in 1926 when Taylor's father became president of the General American Life Insurance Company. In St. Louis, Taylor attended the Rossman School and St. Louis Country Day School. In 1932, the family moved to Memphis, where his father established a law practice. Taylor graduated from Central High School in Memphis in 1935. He wrote his first published piece while there, an interview with actress Katharine Cornell.

After a gap year in which he traveled to England, Taylor enrolled at Southwestern at Memphis (now Rhodes College) in 1936, studying under the critic Allen Tate. Tate encouraged Taylor to transfer to Vanderbilt University, which he later left to continue studying with the great American critic and poet John Crowe Ransom at Kenyon College in Gambier, Ohio. Poet Robert Lowell from Boston was also enrolled there and they became lifelong friends. Taylor also befriended Robert Penn Warren, Randall Jarrell, Katherine Anne Porter, Jean Stafford, James Thackara, Robie Macauley and other significant literary figures of the time.

== Career ==
Considered to be one of the finest American short story writers, Taylor made his fictional milieu the urban South, with references to its history.

His characters, usually middle or upper-class white people, often are living in a time of change in the 20th century, and struggle to discover and define their roles in society. Taylor was "among the first to discover that the Southern city—not town—had literary possibilities." Though the legacy of the American Civil War and "the collapse of the old Southern order" is evident in Taylor's fiction, his work does not present an elegy for the ante bellum period. When black hired servants appear in Taylor's fiction, they often provide ironic insights into the declining family relations and social order of those they serve.

His collection The Old Forest and Other Stories (1985) won the PEN/Faulkner Award. Taylor also wrote three novels, including A Summons to Memphis in 1986, for which he won the 1987 Pulitzer Prize for Fiction, and In the Tennessee Country in 1994. Taylor taught literature and writing at Kenyon College and at the University of Virginia.

He was married for fifty-one years to the poet Eleanor Ross Taylor and died in Charlottesville, Virginia, in 1994. His papers are held at the Vanderbilt University Special Collections and University Archives.

He was a Charter member of the Fellowship of Southern Writers. He corresponded with literary critic M. Bernetta Quinn.

Library of America published a two-volume Complete Stories in 2017.

== Works ==
=== Short story collections ===
- A Long Fourth and Other Stories, introduction by Robert Penn Warren, Harcourt, 1948.
- The Widows of Thornton (includes a play), Harcourt, 1954, reprinted, Louisiana State University Press, 1994.
- Happy Families Are All Alike: A Collection of Stories, Astor Honor, 1959.
- Miss Leonora When Last Seen and Fifteen Other Stories, Astor Honor, 1963.
- The Collected Stories of Peter Taylor, Farrar, Straus, 1969.
- In the Miro District and Other Stories, Knopf, 1977.
- The Old Forest and Other Stories, Dial, 1985.
- The Oracle at Stoneleigh Court, Knopf, 1993.
- Peter Taylor: Complete Stories 1938 to 1959, Library of America, 2017

=== Novels ===
- A Woman of Means, Harcourt, 1950; reprinted, Frederic C. Beil, 1983, Picador, 1996.
- A Summons to Memphis, Knopf, 1986.
- In the Tennessee Country, Knopf, 1994.

=== Plays ===
- Tennessee Day in St. Louis, Random House, 1959.
- A Stand in the Mountains, published in Kenyon Review, 1965; reprinted, Frederic C. Beil, 1985.
- Presences: Seven Dramatic Pieces (contains "Two Images," "A Father and a Son," "Missing Person," "The Whistler," "Arson," "A Voice through the Door," and "The Sweethearts"), Houghton, 1973.

=== Short stories ===
Title	Publication	Collected in
"The Party"	River (March 1937)	Complete Stories 1938-1959
"The Lady Is Civilized"	River (April 1937)	Complete Stories 1938-1959
"The Life Before"	HIKA (November 1939)	Complete Stories 1938-1959
"Cookie" a.k.a. "Middle-Age"	HIKA (December 1939); The New Yorker (November 6, 1948) (revised)	The Widows of Thornton; Miss Leonora When Last Seen
"A Spinster's Tale"	The Southern Review (Autumn 1940)	A Long Fourth and Other Stories; Miss Leonora When Last Seen
"Skyline" a.k.a. "Winged Chariot"	The Southern Review (Winter 1941)	A Long Fourth and Other Stories; Miss Leonora When Last Seen
"The Fancy Woman"	The Southern Review (Summer 1941)	A Long Fourth and Other Stories; Miss Leonora When Last Seen
"A Walled Garden" a.k.a. "Like the Sad Heart of Ruth"	The New Republic (December 8, 1941)	Happy Families Are All Alike; The Old Forest and Other Stories
"The School Girl"	American Prefaces (Spring 1942)	Complete Stories 1938-1959
"Attendant Evils"	A Vanderbilt Miscellany (1944)	Complete Stories 1938-1959
"Rain in the Heart"	The Sewanee Review (Winter 1945)	A Long Fourth and Other Stories; The Old Forest and Other Stories
"The Scoutmaster"	Partisan Review (Summer 1945)	A Long Fourth and Other Stories; The Old Forest and Other Stories
"A Long Fourth"	The Sewanee Review (Summer 1946)	A Long Fourth and Other Stories; The Old Forest and Other Stories
"Allegiance"	The Kenyon Review (Spring 1947)	A Long Fourth and Other Stories; Miss Leonora When Last Seen; The Old Forest and Other Stories
"Casa Anna"*	Harper's Bazaar (November 1948)	* Excerpt from A Woman of Means
"Dudley for the Dartmouth Cup"*	The New Yorker (May 28, 1949)	* Excerpt from A Woman of Means
"Porte-Cochere"	The New Yorker (July 16, 1949)	The Widows of Thornton; The Old Forest and Other Stories
"A Wife of Nashville"	The New Yorker (December 3, 1949)	The Widows of Thornton; Miss Leonora When Last Seen
"Uncles"	The New Yorker (December 17, 1949)	Complete Stories 1938-1959
"Their Losses"	The New Yorker (March 11, 1950)	The Widows of Thornton; Miss Leonora When Last Seen
"What You Hear From 'Em?"	The New Yorker (February 10, 1951)	The Widows of Thornton; Miss Leonora When Last Seen
"Two Ladies in Retirement"	The New Yorker (March 31, 1951)	The Widows of Thornton; The Old Forest and Other Stories
"Bad Dreams"	The New Yorker (May 19, 1951)	The Widows of Thornton; Miss Leonora When Last Seen; The Old Forest and Other Stories
"The Dark Walk"	Harper's Bazaar (March 1954)	The Widows of Thornton
"1939" a.k.a. "A Sentimental Journey"	The New Yorker (March 12, 1955)	Happy Families Are All Alike
"The Other Times"	The New Yorker (February 23, 1957)	Happy Families Are All Alike
"Promise of Rain" a.k.a. "The Unforgivable"	The New Yorker (January 25, 1958)	Happy Families Are All Alike; The Old Forest and Other Stories
"Venus, Cupid, Folly and Time"	The Kenyon Review (Spring 1958)	Happy Families Are All Alike
"Je Suis Perdu" a.k.a. "A Pair of Bright-Blue Eyes"	The New Yorker (June 7, 1958)	Happy Families Are All Alike
"The Little Cousins" a.k.a. "Cousins, Family Life, Family Love, All That"	The New Yorker (April 25, 1959)	Happy Families Are All Alike; The Old Forest and Other Stories
"A Friend and Protector" a.k.a. "Who Was Jesse's Friend and Protector?"	The Kenyon Review (Summer 1959)	Happy Families Are All Alike; The Old Forest and Other Stories
"Heads of Houses"	The New Yorker (September 12, 1959)	Happy Families Are All Alike
"Guests"	The New Yorker (October 3, 1959)	Happy Families Are All Alike
"Miss Leonora When Last Seen"	The New Yorker (November 19, 1960)	Miss Leonora When Last Seen
"Reservations: A Love Story"	The New Yorker (February 25, 1961)	Miss Leonora When Last Seen
"Nerves"	The New Yorker (September 16, 1961)	The Oracle at Stoneleigh Court
"An Overwhelming Question"	Encounter (March 1962)	Miss Leonora When Last Seen; The Oracle at Stoneleigh Court
"At the Drugstore"	The Sewanee Review (Autumn 1962)	Miss Leonora When Last Seen
"Demons" a.k.a. "A Strange Story"	The New Yorker (August 24, 1963)	The Oracle at Stoneleigh Court
"Two Pilgrims"	The New Yorker (September 7, 1963)	Miss Leonora When Last Seen
"There"	The Kenyon Review (Winter 1964)	The Collected Stories of Peter Taylor
"The Throughway"	The Sewanee Review (Autumn 1964)	In the Miro District
"The End of Play"	Virginia Quarterly Review (Spring 1965)	The Oracle at Stoneleigh Court
"A Cheerful Disposition"	The Sewanee Review (Spring 1967)	Complete Stories 1960-1992
"Mrs. Billingsby's Wine"	The New Yorker (October 14, 1967)	The Collected Stories of Peter Taylor
"First Heat"	Shenandoah (Winter 1968)	The Collected Stories of Peter Taylor
"The Decline and Fall of the Episcopal Church in the Year of Our Lord 1952" a.k.a. "Tom, Tell Him"	The Sewanee Review (Spring 1968)	The Oracle at Stoneleigh Court
"The Elect"	McCall's (April 1968)	The Collected Stories of Peter Taylor
"Dean of Men"	Virginia Quarterly Review (Spring 1969)	The Collected Stories of Peter Taylor
"Daphne's Lover"	The Sewanee Review (Spring 1969)	In the Miro District
"The Instruction of a Mistress"	The New Review (September 1974)	In the Miro District
"The Hand of Emmagene"	Shenandoah (Winter 1975)	In the Miro District
"Three Heroines"	Virginia Quarterly Review (Spring 1975)	In the Miro District
"The Megalopolitans"	Ploughshares (Fall 1975)	Complete Stories 1960-1992
"The Captain's Son"	The New Yorker (January 12, 1976)	In the Miro District
"Her Need"	Shenandoah (Summer 1976)	In the Miro District
"In the Miro District"	The New Yorker (February 7, 1977)	In the Miro District
"The Old Forest"	The New Yorker (May 14, 1979)	The Old Forest and Other Stories
"The Gift of the Prodigal"	The New Yorker (June 1, 1981)	The Old Forest and Other Stories
"The Witch of Owl Mountain Springs: An Account of Her Remarkable Powers"	The Kenyon Review (Winter 1991)	The Oracle at Stoneleigh Court
"The Oracle at Stoneleigh Court"	New Virginia Review (Summer 1992)	The Oracle at Stoneleigh Court
"At the Art Theater"	Greensboro Review (Summer 1992)	The Oracle at Stoneleigh Court
"In the Waiting Room" a.k.a. "The Waiting Room"	The Southern Review (Autumn 1992)	The Oracle at Stoneleigh Court
"The Real Ghost" a.k.a. "Reflections"	-	The Oracle at Stoneleigh Court

=== Other ===
(Editor with Robert Lowell and Robert Penn Warren) Randall Jarrell, 1914-1965, Farrar, Straus, 1967.

Peter Taylor Reading and Commenting on His Fiction (audio tape), Archive of Recorded Poetry and Literature, 1987.

== Awards and honors ==
- 1986 – PEN/Faulkner Award for Fiction for The Old Forest and Other Stories
- 1987 – Pulitzer Prize for Fiction for A Summons to Memphis
- 1993 – PEN/Malamud Award for "excellence in the art of the short story"

== Sources ==
- Beattie, Ann. 2017. Interview: "Ann Beattie on the short fiction of Peter Taylor: "He just transcends every category." Library of America, November 6, 2017.https://www.loa.org/news-and-views/1340-ann-beattie-on-the-short-fiction-of-peter-taylor-he-just-transcends-every-category/ Accessed April 30, 2026.
- Giroux, Robert. 1995. "LIVES WELL LIVED: PETER TAYLOR; Peter's Friend." New York Times, January 1, 1995. Check this URL https://www.nytimes.com/1995/01/01/magazine/lives-well-lived-peter-taylor-peters-friend.html Accessed April 14, 2026.
- Guda, Eric. 2018. "The Acceptance of Certain Mysteries: Peter Taylor's 'Complete Stories.'" Los Angeles Review of Books. January 8, 2018. https://lareviewofbooks.org/article/the-acceptance-of-certain-mysteries-peter-taylors-complete-stories/ Accessed May 4, 2026.
- Howard, Richard. 1969. "The Collected Stories of Peter Taylor" New York Times, October 19, 1969. https://www.nytimes.com/1969/10/19/archives/the-collected-stories-of-peter-taylor-535-pp-new-york-farrar-straus.html Accessed April 15, 2026.
- Robinson, Marilynn. 1986. "The Family Game Was Revenge." New York Times, October 19, 1986.https://www.nytimes.com/1986/10/19/books/the-family-game-was-revenge.html Accessed April 29, 2026.
- Robison, James Curry. 1988. Peter Taylor: A Study of the Short Fiction. Twanyes Publishers, Boston. G. K. Hall & Co., Gordon Weaver, General Editor. ISBN 0-8057-8303-2
- Towers, Robert. 1985. "A Master of the Miniature Novel." New York Times, February 17, 1985. https://archive.nytimes.com/www.nytimes.com/books/98/12/06/specials/taylor-forest.html Accessed April 14, 2026.
- Warren, Robert Penn. 1948. Introduction to A Long Fourth and Other Stories. pp. viii-x Harcourt Brace Jovanich, New York. OCLC 30069097
- Sullivan, Walter. 1972. "In Time of the Breaking of the Nations: The Decline of Southern Fiction." in Death By Melancholy: Essays on Modern Southern Literature. Louisiana State University Press, Baton Rouge. ISBN 978-0807102367 from Peter Taylor: A Study of the Short Fiction. Twanye Publishers, Boston. G. K. Hall & Co., Gordon Weaver, General Editor. p. 16. ISBN 0-8057-8303-2
