= Reed Whittemore =

American poet (1919–2012)

- Born: Edward Reed Whittemore, Jr. September 11, 1919; New Haven, Connecticut, U.S.
- Died: April 6, 2012 (aged 92); Kensington, Maryland, U.S.
- Education: Yale University (BA)

Edward Reed Whittemore Jr. (September 11, 1919 – April 6, 2012) was an American poet, biographer, critic, literary journalist and college professor. He was appointed the sixteenth and later the twenty-eighth Poet Laureate Consultant in Poetry to the Library of Congress in 1964, and in 1984.

== Biography ==
Edward Reed Whittemore Jr. was born in New Haven, Connecticut to Edward Reed Whittemore, a doctor, and Margaret Whittemore née Carr. He attended Phillips Academy and received a Bachelor of Arts from Yale University in 1941. As a sophomore at Yale, he and his roommate James Angleton started a literary magazine called Furioso which became one of the most famous "little magazines" of its day and published many notable poets including Ezra Pound and William Carlos Williams. "It was the ne plus ultra of little magazines" according to Victor Navasky. The magazine was published intermittently until 1953. After service in the Army, he published his first volume of poetry in 1946. From 1947 to 1966, he was a professor of English at Carleton College. While at Carleton he renewed his magazine under the name the Carleton Miscellany, which ran from 1960 to 1980, and published many first-time poets such as Charles Wright. He taught at the University of Maryland College Park until 1984.

Whittemore was Poet Laureate of Maryland and twice (in 1964 and 1984) served as Poet Laureate Consultant in Poetry to the Library of Congress. He also served as literary editor of The New Republic from 1969 to 1973.

His poetry is notable for its wry and deflating humor. The poet X.J. Kennedy remarked that "his whole career has been one brave protest against dullness and stodginess." His book The Mother's Breast and the Father's House was a finalist for the National Book Award for poetry. He is the recipient of the National Council on the Arts Award for lifelong contribution to American Letters and the Award of Merit Medal from the American Academy of Arts and Letters.

The poet James Dickey wrote of Whittemore in Poetry magazine that, “as a poet with certain very obvious and amusing gifts, he is almost everyone’s favorite. Certainly he is one of mine. Yet there are dangerous favorites and inconsequential favorites and favorites like pleasant diseases. What of Whittemore? He is as wittily cultural as they come, he has read more than any . . . man anybody knows, has been at all kinds of places, yet shuffles along in an old pair of tennis shoes and khaki pants, with his hands in his pockets.”

In November 2007 Dryad Press published his memoir, Against the Grain: The Literary Life of a Poet, with an introduction by Garrison Keillor who took a class from him in his youth, calling him a "movie-star handsome poet and teacher" who "owns the only sort of immortality that matters to a writer, which is to have written things that people remember years later . . . What makes R.W. permanently readable and relevant is his wit and humor, which is the underground spring that keeps the gardens of American literature green."

Always self-effacing, Whittemore describes himself at 21 in his memoir: "He was nearsighted but wore no glasses. He had a medium-grade mind and managed to mix intellectual modesty with sudden arrogance. . . . He preferred to think of himself as a genuine rebel yet couldn't help being polite."

He was married to Helen Lundeen and had four children: Cate, Ned, Jack, and Daisy.

== Bibliography ==
Poetry

- Heroes & Heroines (1946)
- An American Takes a Walk (1956)
- The Self-Made Man (1959)
- The Boy from Iowa (1962)
- Poems, New and Selected (1967)
- Fifty Poems Fifty (1970)
- The Mother's Breast and the Father's House (1974)
- The Feel of Rock: Poems of Three Decades (1982)
- The Past, the Future, the Present: Poems Selected and New (1990)
- Ten from Ten & One More (2007)
- The Season of Waiting: Selected Poems: 1946–2006 (Hebrew trans by Moseh Dor) (2007)

Prose

- The Little Magazine and Contemporary Literature (1966)
- From Zero to Absolute (1967)
- The Fascination of the Abomination: Poems, stories, essays (1963)
- William Carlos Williams: Poet from Jersey (1975)
- The Poet as Journalist: Life at the New Republic (1976)
- Pure Lives: The Early Biographers (1988)
- Whole Lives: Shapers of Modern Biography (1989)
- Six Literary Lives (1993)
- Against The Grain: The Literary Life of a Poet, a Memoir by Reed Whittemore (2007)
