= The Collected Stories of Jean Stafford =

1969 short story collection by Jean Stafford

- First edition cover
- Author: Jean Stafford
- Language: English
- Genre: Short story collection
- Publisher: Farrar, Straus & Giroux
- Publication date: 1969
- Publication place: United States
- Media type: Print (hardcover)
- Pages: 463
- Award: Pulitzer Prize for Fiction (1970)
- ISBN: 9780374126322
- OCLC: 1948

The Collected Stories of Jean Stafford is a short story collection by American author Jean Stafford, published in 1969 by Farrar, Straus & Giroux. It won the Pulitzer Prize for Fiction in 1970.

== Contents ==
The stories in this volume are selected from these previously published collections: Children Are Bored on Sunday (1953) and Bad Characters (1964). The groupings under which the stories appear below are unrelated to the earlier collections.

Fourteen of Stafford's short stories, originally published in periodicals, remain uncollected.

- Author's Note

=== The Innocents Abroad ===
- "Maggie Meriwether's Rich Experience" (The New Yorker, June 25, 1955)
- "The Children's Game" (The Saturday Evening Post, October 4, 1958, as "The Reluctant Gambler")
- "The Echo and the Nemesis" (The New Yorker, December 16, 1950, as "The Nemesis")
- "The Maiden" (The New Yorker, April 29, 1950)
- "A Modest Proposal" (The New Yorker, July 23, 1949, as "Pax Vobiscum")
- "Caveat Emptor" ( Mademoiselle, May 1956, as "The Matchmaker")

=== The Bostonians, and Other Manifestations of the American Scene ===
- "Life is No Abyss" (The Sewanee Review, July-September 1952)
- "The Hope Chest" (Harper's Magazine, January 1947)
- "Polite Conversation" (The New Yorker, August 20, 1949)
- "A Country Love Story" (The New Yorker, May 6, 1950)
- "The Bleeding Heart" (Partisan Review, September 1948)
- "The Lippia Lawn" (The Kenyon Review, Spring 1944)
- "The Interior Castle" (Partisan Review, November-December 1946)

=== Cowboys and Indians, and Magic Mountains ===
- "The Healthiest Girl in Town" (The New Yorker, May 31, 1951)
- "The Tea Time of the Stouthearted Ladies" (The Kenyon Review, Winter 1964)
- "The Mountain Day" (The New Yorker, August 18, 1956)
- "The Darkening Moon" (Harper's Bazaar, January 1945)
- "Bad Characters" (The New Yorker, December 4, 1954)
- "In the Zoo" (The New Yorker, September 19, 1953)
- "The Liberation" (The New Yorker, May 30, 1953)
- "A Reading Problem" (The New Yorker, June 30, 1956)
- "A Summer Day" (The New Yorker, September 4, 1948)
- "The Philosophy Lesson" (The New Yorker, November 9, 1968)

=== Manhattan Island ===
- "Children Are Bored on Sunday" (The New Yorker, February 14, 1948)
- "Beatrice Trueblood's Story" (The New Yorker, February 26, 1955)
- "Between the Porch and the Altar" (Partisan Review, Spring 1945)
- "I Love Someone" (Colorado Quarterly, Summer 1952)
- "Cops and Robbers" (The New Yorker, January 24, 1953, as "The Shorn Lamb")
- "The Captain's Gift" (The Sewanee Review, April-June 1946, as "The Present")
- "The End of a Career" (The New Yorker, January 21, 1956)

== Critical assessment ==
"Most of the people in these stories are away from home, and while they are probably homesick, they won't go back. In a sense, then, the geographical grouping I have chosen for stories is arbitrary. I have borrowed titles from Mark Twain and Henry James (I am a great one for appropriating other people's titles), who are two of my favorite American writers and whose sense of place I feel allied."—Jean Stafford in Author's note to the collection.

In a retrospective appraisal of Stafford's novel The Mountain Lion (1947), Author and critic Yardley, Jonathan laments that this work, as well as her two other novels—Boston Adventure (1944) and The Catherine Wheel (1952)—were no longer in print.

Declaring Stafford "a figure of genuine consequence in American literature," Yardley, offers this suggestion: "If you can't find a copy [of her novels], read The Collected Stories. She was a master of that form, and everything in that quite large book is a gem."

== Sources ==
- Rochette-Crawley, Susan. 1994. "Enjoying the Conceit of Suddenness": An Analysis of Brevity, Context, and Textual "Identity" in Jean Stafford's "Caveat Emptor"," Short Story: Vol. 2: No. 1, Article 11. https://scholarworks.uni.edu/shortstory/vol2/iss1/11 Accessed March 4, 2026.
- Stafford, Jean. 1984. The Collected Stories of Jean Stafford. E. P. Dutton, New York. ISBN 0-525-48101-X
- Stafford, Jean. 1969. Author's note to The Collected Stories of Jean Stafford. E. P. Dutton, New York. ISBN 0-525-48101-X
- Yardley, Jonathan. 2007. "Jean Stafford, Diamond in A Rough Life." The Washington Post, February 12, 2007. https://www.washingtonpost.com/wp-dyn/content/article/2007/02/11/AR2007021101502.html Accessed 24 February, 2026.
