= The Catherine Wheel (novel) =

Novel by Jean Stafford

- First edition
- Author: Jean Stafford
- Language: English
- Publisher: Harcourt & Brace
- Publication date: 1952
- Publication place: United States
- Media type: Print (hardback)
- Pages: 281
- OCLC: 290543

The Catherine Wheel is a novel by Jean Stafford published in 1952 by Harcourt & Brace.

== Contents ==
- I On the First Day of Summer
- II My True Love Took from Me
- III The Sea's Souvenirs
- IV The Late Wedding Ring
- V The Dream of a Dove
- VI The Child in the House
- VII The Leaves of the Fig Trees
- VIII On the Final Night of Summer

== Reception ==
Writing in The Kenyon Review, novelist and literary critic Irving Howe registered dissatisfaction with The Catherine Wheel. Howe's complaint centers on Stafford's bravura performance as a literary stylist, but which her "dazzling" prose tends to overwhelm the narrative elements.

Unfortunately the problem reappears in The Catherine Wheel: her sensibility is so voracious that it consumes the story...[F]or all her ingenuity, the main theme is only set up, seldom developed.

== Retrospective appraisal ==
"Miss Stafford's prose is so fine and frequently so winning that it finally becomes a source of fascination in itself, undermining the matter it is supposed to reveal. The author, in brief, is too much in the way, dazzling us with her splendid prose and dazzling her characters into a bashful withdrawal."—Novelist Irving Howe from The Kenyon Review, Spring 1952 on The Catherine Wheel.

Reviewer Scott Bradfield in the Los Angeles Times praises The Catherine Wheel as "the last of her excellent novels," and "reminiscent of Henry James."

Biographer Mary Ann Wilson considers The Catherine Wheel Stafford's "most complex novel" of her three novels.

== Theme ==
Catherine of Alexandria and the Catherine Wheel on which she was said to have been martyred. Artist: Caravaggio.

The title of the novel had a number of associations for Stafford, primarily a reference to the Christian martyr and saint Catherine of Alexandria, also spelled Katherine,[a] Catherine is said to have died during the early 4th century by order of the Roman emperor Maxentius.

The torture device used in Saint Catherine's public execution was the breaking wheel, also known as the Catherine or Katherine Wheel. According to critic Blanche H. Gelfant, Stafford's protagonist, Katherine, suffers a gruesome death similar to that of the saint:

In The Catherine Wheel, the destruction is stunningly graphic: Stafford's heroine is consumed in flames, turned to ash, on a whirling wheel of fireworks. This flaming circle, a spectacle intended for pleasure, resembles a medieval instrument of pain, a spinning rack that tortured victims by its turning."

Critic Irving Howe considers Stafford's resort to "a spectacular death [is] convenient as a way of evading Katharine's difficulty but disturbing as the climax to 250 pages of static introspection." Biographer David Roberts shares an anecdote from Stafford that corresponds with the title of the novel, occurring five years after its publication:

In September 1957 Jean crossed the Atlantic, to be met by her suitor at Southampton. Joe Leibling's' chivalry delighted her: they drove all the way to London in chauffeured Rolls, pausing during the "supremely sunny, rose-smelling day for a picnic of caviar, cheese, and red wine. "I longed for my first taste of flattish, warmish English lager" she noted, "so we stopped at a pub called The Catherine Wheel."

== Sources ==
- Bradfield, Scott. 2019. "The new collection roams as many extremes as Jean Stafford's Golden State." Los Angeles Times, November 27, 2019. https://www.latimes.com/entertainment-arts/books/story/2019-11-27/jean-stafford-complete-novels-boston-adventure-the-mountain-lion-the-catherine-wheel Accessed 16 February, 2026.
- Gelfant, Blanche H. 1979. "Revolutionary Turnings: 'The Mountain Lion.'" The Massachusetts Review, Spring 1979, Vol. 20, No. 1, pp. 117-125. https://www.jstor.org/stable/25088931 Accessed 24 February, 2026.
- Howe, Irving. 1952. "Sensibility Troubles." The Kenyon Review, Spring, 1952, Vol. 14, No. 2, The Dante Number (Spring, 1952), pp. 345-348 Kenyon College. https://www.jstor.org/stable/4333333 Accessed 23 February, 2026.
- Roberts, David. 1988. "Jean & Joe: The Stafford-Liebling Marriage." The American Scholar, Summer 1988, Vol. 57, No. 3, pp. 373-391 The Phi Beta Kappa Society https://www.jstor.org/stable/41211547 Accessed 23 February, 2026.
- Wilson, Mary Ann. 1996. Jean Stafford: A Study of the Short Fiction. Twayne Publishers. Simon & Schuster, New York. ISBN 0-8057-7807-1
