= The Interior Castle =

The Interior Castle may refer to:

- The Interior Castle (book), a 1577 book by Teresa of Ávila
- The Interior Castle (short story), a 1946 short story by Jean Stafford
