= Jean Stafford =

American author (1915–1979)

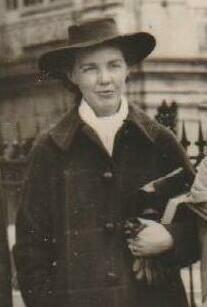
- Stafford in 1941
- Born: July 1, 1915; Covina, California, U.S.
- Died: March 26, 1979 (aged 63); White Plains, New York, U.S.
- Education: University of Colorado Boulder (BA, MA)
- Occupations: Novelist, short story writer
- Spouses: Robert Lowell (m. 1940; div. 1948) Oliver Jensen (m. 1950; div. 1953) A. J. Liebling (m. 1959; died 1963)
- Writing career
- Genre: Literary fiction
- Notable works: Boston Adventure; The Mountain Lion; The Collected Stories of Jean Stafford

Jean Stafford (July 1, 1915 – March 26, 1979) was an American short story writer and novelist. She won the Pulitzer Prize for Fiction for The Collected Stories of Jean Stafford in 1970.

Her fiction is highly regarded for its elegant style and its precision in rendering the social isolation of her characters.

Stafford's short fiction is frequently anthologized.

== Early life and education ==
Jean Stafford was born in Covina, California, the fourth child of Mary Ethel (McKillop) and John Richard Stafford, who owned a walnut ranch. The family moved in 1920 to San Diego and after her father was ruined in the stock market, to Colorado, where he was a largely unsuccessful writer and his wife ran a boarding house. Stafford's second novel, The Mountain Lion (1947), draws on her childhood in Colorado. She earned bachelor's and master's degrees from the University of Colorado Boulder in 1936, and then studied for a year at the University of Heidelberg on a fellowship. Later in the 1930s she was briefly enrolled in graduate school at the University of Iowa.

== Career ==
After returning to the United States, Stafford worked as assistant to the director of the summer writing conference at the University of Colorado, Boulder, then taught English for a year at Stephens College before moving to Massachusetts, where she eventually settled in Concord to concentrate on writing.

Her first novel, Boston Adventure (1944), was a best-seller. With the proceeds she was able to buy a house in Damariscotta Mills, Maine. She wrote two more novels, but became better known for her short stories, many of which were published in The New Yorker.

Stafford also published many book reviews. She served as secretary of The Southern Review while living in Baton Rouge with her first husband, and for the academic year 1964–1965 was a Fellow at the Center for Advanced Studies of Wesleyan University.

== Honors ==
Stafford was awarded a grant from the National Institute of Arts and Letters in 1945 and was twice awarded Guggenheim Fellowships in fiction, in 1945 and 1948. She won seven O Henry Awards for her short stories, and in 1970 The Collected Stories of Jean Stafford won the Pulitzer Prize for Fiction. She was made a member of the National Institute of Arts and Letters.

== Personal life and death ==
Stafford lived briefly with the Sinologist James Hightower, a college friend in both Boulder and Heidelberg, before dating the poet Robert Lowell, whom she had also met in Boulder. In 1938 she suffered serious spinal and facial injuries in a car accident with Lowell at the wheel; she drew on the trauma in her story "The Interior Castle", and sued Lowell for her medical expenses. She nonetheless married him in April 1940; the marriage ended in divorce in 1948. A second marriage to Life magazine staff writer Oliver Jensen in 1950 also ended in divorce, in 1953.

In the summer of 1956 Stafford traveled to London in search of subject matter. There she met editor Eve Auchincloss who would become a friend and mentor. Stafford's editor at The New Yorker, Katherine S. White, introduced her to A. J. Liebling, a prominent American journalist at the periodical, who was living in England. Stafford and Leibing had long held one another's work in high esteem. In 1959 they married. The union was a happy one, but ended with his death in 1963.

Stafford continued to live in their house on Long Island, New York, and to write primarily non-fiction, including an interview-based portrait of Lee Harvey Oswald's mother, A Mother in History, published in 1966.

A novel-in-progress, The Parliament of Women, remained unfinished at the time of her death.

For much of her life she suffered from alcoholism and depression. She was hospitalized at Payne Whitney Psychiatric Clinic for almost a year in the late 1940s. She had a stroke in 1976 and developed emphysema; she died in a clinic in White Plains, New York, in 1979, at the age of 63. Her ashes were placed with Liebling's in Green River Cemetery in East Hampton.

== Legacy ==
The Library of America republished Stafford's fiction in 2019 and 2021.

Several biographies of Jean Stafford were written following her death, including David Roberts' Jean Stafford: a Biography (1988), Charlotte Margolis Goodman's Jean Stafford: The Savage Heart (1990), and Ann Hulbert's The Interior Castle: The Art and Life of Jean Stafford (1992).

In The Elements of Style, E. B. White cites Stafford as an example of good prose: "Jean Stafford, to cite a modern author, demonstrates in her story 'In the Zoo' how prose is made vivid by the use of words and images that evoke sensations."

=== Novels ===
- Boston Adventure, 1944
- The Mountain Lion, 1947
- The Catherine Wheel, 1952
- The Interior Castle (1953), includes Boston Adventure (1944), The Mountain Lion (1947), and the short story collection Children Are Bored on Sunday (1953)

=== Short story collections ===
- Children Are Bored on Sunday, 1953, includes "The Interior Castle" (1946)
- A Book of Stories, with John Cheever, Daniel Fuchs, and William Maxwell, 1956 (five stories)
- Bad Characters, 1964
- Collected Stories, 1969

=== Juvenile books ===
- Elephi: The Cat with the High I.Q., 1962
- The Lion and the Carpenter and Other Tales from the Arabian Tales Retold, 1962

=== Nonfiction ===
- A Mother in History, 1966, a profile of Marguerite Oswald, mother of Lee Harvey Oswald

=== Short stories ===
Title	Publication	Collected in
"And Lots of Solid Color"	American Prefaces (November 1939)	Collected Stories & Other Writings
"The Darkening Moon"	Harper's Bazaar (January 1944)	The Collected Stories of Jean Stafford
"The Lippia Lawn"	The Kenyon Review (Spring 1944)	The Collected Stories of Jean Stafford
"A Reunion"	Partisan Review (Fall 1944)	Collected Stories & Other Writings
"The Home Front"	Partisan Review (Spring 1945)	Children Are Bored on Sunday
"Between the Porch and the Altar"	Harper's Magazine (June 1945)	Children Are Bored on Sunday
"The Captain's Gift" a.k.a. "The Present"	The Sewanee Review (April 1946)	Bad Characters
"The Interior Castle"	Partisan Review (Nov-Dec 1946)	Children Are Bored on Sunday
"The Hope Chest"	Harper's Magazine (January 1947)	The Collected Stories of Jean Stafford
"A Slight Maneuver"	Mademoiselle (February 1947)	Collected Stories & Other Writings
"Children Are Bored on Sunday"	The New Yorker (February 21, 1948)	Children Are Bored on Sunday
"The Bleeding Heart"	Partisan Review (September 1948)	Children Are Bored on Sunday
"A Summer Day"	The New Yorker (September 11, 1948)	Children Are Bored on Sunday
"The Cavalier"	The New Yorker (February 12, 1949)	The Collected Stories of Jean Stafford
"A Modest Proposal" a.k.a. "Pax Vobiscum"	The New Yorker (July 23, 1949)	Children Are Bored on Sunday
"Polite Conversation"	The New Yorker (August 20, 1949)	The Collected Stories of Jean Stafford
"A Country Love Story"	The New Yorker (May 6, 1950)	Children Are Bored on Sunday
"The Maiden"	The New Yorker (July 29, 1950)	Children Are Bored on Sunday
"Old Flaming Youth"	Harper's Bazaar (December 1950)	Collected Stories & Other Writings
"The Echo and the Nemesis" a.k.a. "The Nemesis"	The New Yorker (December 16, 1950)	Children Are Bored on Sunday
"The Healthiest Girl in Town"	The New Yorker (April 7, 1951)	The Collected Stories of Jean Stafford
"The Violet Rock"	The New Yorker (April 26, 1952)	Collected Stories & Other Writings
"I Love Someone"	Colorado Quarterly (Summer 1952)	The Collected Stories of Jean Stafford
"Life Is No Abyss"	The Sewanee Review (July 1952)	The Collected Stories of Jean Stafford
"The Connoisseurs"	Harper's Bazaar (October 1952)	Collected Stories & Other Writings
"Cops and Robbers" a.k.a. "The Shorn Lamb"	The New Yorker (January 24, 1953)	Bad Characters
"The Liberation"	The New Yorker (May 30, 1953)	Stories (1956); Bad Characters
"In the Zoo"	The New Yorker (September 19, 1953)	Stories (1956); Bad Characters
"A Winter's Tale"	New Short Novels (Ballantine, 1954)	Bad Characters
"Bad Characters"	The New Yorker (December 4, 1954)	Stories (1956); Bad Characters
"Beatrice Trueblood's Story"	The New Yorker (February 26, 1955)	Stories (1956)
"Maggie Meriwether's Rich Experience"	The New Yorker (June 25, 1955)	Stories (1956)
"The Warlock"	The New Yorker (December 24, 1955)	Collected Stories & Other Writings
"The End of a Career"	The New Yorker (January 21, 1956)	Bad Characters
"Caveat Emptor" a.k.a. "The Matchmaker"	Mademoiselle (May 1956)	Bad Characters
"A Reading Problem"	The New Yorker (June 30, 1956)	Bad Characters
"The Mountain Day"	The New Yorker (August 18, 1956)	The Collected Stories of Jean Stafford
"My Blithe, Sad Bird"	The New Yorker (April 6, 1957)	Collected Stories & Other Writings
"A Reasonable Facsimile"	The New Yorker (August 3, 1957)	Bad Characters
"The Children's Game"	The Saturday Evening Post (October 4, 1958)	The Collected Stories of Jean Stafford
"The Scarlet Letter"	Mademoiselle (July 1959)	Collected Stories & Other Writings
"The Tea Time of Stouthearted Ladies"	The Kenyon Review (Winter 1964)	The Collected Stories of Jean Stafford
"The Ordeal of Conrad Pardee"	Ladies' Home Journal (July 1964)	Collected Stories & Other Writings
"The Philosophy Lesson"	The New Yorker (November 16, 1968)	The Collected Stories of Jean Stafford
"An Influx of Poets"	The New Yorker (November 6, 1978)	The Collected Stories of Jean Stafford (not present in first edition)
"Woden's Day"	Shenandoah (Autumn 1979)	Collected Stories & Other Writings

=== Uncollected short fiction ===
The date and journal of publication are indicated for these uncollected works of short fiction.

- "And Lots of Solid Color" (American Prefaces 5, November 1939)
- "The Cavalier" (The New Yorker, February 12, 1949)
- "The Connosseurs" (Harper's Bazaar, October 1952)
- "An Influx of Poets" (The New Yorker, November 6, 1978)
- "Mountain Jim" (Boy's Life, February 1968)
- "My Blythe, Sad Bird" (The New Yorker, April 6, 1957)
- "Old Flaming Youth" (Harper's Bazaar, December 1950)
- "The Ordeal of Conrad Pardee" (Ladies' Home Journal, July 1964)
- "A Reunion" (Partisan Review 11, Autumn 1944)
- "The Scarlet Letter" (Mademoiselle, July 1959)
- "A Slight Maneuver" (Mademoiselle, February 1947)
- "The Violet Rock" (The New Yorker, April 16, 1952)
- "The Warlock" (The New Yorker, December 24, 1955)
- "Woden's Day" (Shenandoah, Autumn 1979)

== Dramatic adaptations ==
- "The Hope Chest" was adapted into a 30-minute TV film in 1952, starring Florence Bates.
- "The Scarlet Letter" was adapted into a 30-minute TV film in 1982, starring Christian Slater as Virgil Meade.

== Sources ==
- Howe, Irving. 1952. "Sensibility Troubles." The Kenyon Review, Spring, 1952, Vol. 14, No. 2, The Dante Number (Spring, 1952), pp. 345-348 Kenyon College. https://www.jstor.org/stable/4333333 Accessed 23 February, 2026.
- Leary, William. 1987. "Pictures at an Exhibition: Jean Stafford's 'Children Are Bored on Sunday.'" The Kenyon Review, Spring, 1987, New Series, Vol. 9, No. 2, pp.1-8. Published by: Kenyon College https://www.jstor.org/stable/4335798 Accessed 17 February, 2026.
- Oates, Joyce Carol. 1965. "Review: Notions Good and Bad Reviewed Work(s): Sometimes a Great Notion by Ken Kesey: Bad Characters by Jean Stafford: Cabot Wright Begins by James Purdy." The Kenyon Review, Winter, 1965, Vol. 27, No. 1, pp. 175-180. Published by: Kenyon College https://www.jstor.org/stable/4334526 Accessed 17 February, 2026.
- Peden, William. 1953. "A Bleak, Sad World; CHILDREN ARE BORED ON SUNDAY." New York Times, May 10, 1953. https://www.nytimes.com/1953/05/10/archives/a-bleak-sad-world-children-are-bored-on-sunday-by-jean-stafford-252.html Accessed 12 February, 2026.
- Roberts, David. 1988. "Jean & Joe: The Stafford-Liebling Marriage." The American Scholar, Summer 1988, Vol. 57, No. 3 , pp. 373-391 The Phi Beta Kappa Society https://www.jstor.org/stable/41211547 Accessed 23 February, 2026.
- Ryan, Maureen. 1994. "Green Visors and Ivory Towers: Jean Stafford and the New Journalism." The Kenyon Review, Autumn, 1994, New Series, Vol. 16, No. 4 pp. 104-119. Kenyon College. https://www.jstor.org/stable/4337139 Accessed 17 February, 2026.
- Toynton, Evelyn. 1991. Books in Review: Jean Stafford: The Savage Heart by Charlotte Margolis Goodman. Salmagundi, No. 92 (Fall 1991), pp. 238-244. Skidmore College.https://www.jstor.org/stable/40548324 Accessed 20 February 2026.
- Wilson, Mary Ann. 1996. Jean Stafford: A Study of the Short Fiction. Twayne Publishers. Simon & Schuster, New York. ISBN 0-8057-7807-1
