= The Mountain Lion =

Novel by Jean Stafford

- First edition
- Author: Jean Stafford
- Language: English
- Publisher: Harcourt Brace
- Publication date: 1947
- Publication place: United States
- Media type: Print
- Pages: 248

The Mountain Lion is a novel by Jean Stafford first published in 1947 by Harcourt & Brace. The novel was republished in 1953 in The Interior Castle (1953), which also includes Stafford's first novel, Boston Adventure (1944), and her short story collection Children Are Bored on Sunday (1953).

== Synopsis ==
"Poor old Molly! I loved her dearly and I hope she rests in peace. —Jean Stafford in author's note to The Mountain Lion (September 21, 1971)

Eight-year-old Molly and her ten-year-old brother Ralph live in a Los Angeles suburb where they are sheltered by their mother after they are left weak by scarlet fever. One summer, she relents to allow them to visit their Uncle Claude's ranch in Colorado, on the condition that they are not to go horseback riding or engage in "perilous amusements". Although fearful, the pair resolve to use this opportunity learn more about the world they have been missing. They return each summer for several years, providing a contrast between their dull suburban school years and the challenges of ranch life as the children grow into adults.

== Reception ==
Orville Prescott, in the New York Times detects elements of a "controlled and conscious work of art" that largely eclipses Stafford's first novel, Boston Adventure (1944).

Its characters are painfully real, interesting as individuals and significant as representatives of various attitudes toward life. Its story moves swiftly, quietly, surely to a tragic conclusion, which is surprising and yet somehow inevitably appropriate. ..convincing evidence that Miss Stafford has both the creative imagination and the artistic self-discipline to become one of our most interesting novelists.

Novelist Irving Howe praises Stafford's improved handling of her narratives: "In The Mountain Lion Miss Stafford solved one of her most troublesome problems, how to control her rich style so that it would allow the action to emerge tensely and cleanly."

== Theme ==
Stafford examines the American West and her ambivalence towards its icons, as well as social traditions of the East. Biographer Mary Ann Wilson writes:

The Mountain Lion [is] her most extended treatment of the western theme...Stafford demythologizes the Old West by making it the locus of distinctly unheroic actions and frequently comparing it to the East...to the detriment of both.

Literary critic Blanche H. Gelfant in The Massachusetts Review writes:

The Mountain Lion...surveys the American scene, East and West, to find everyone everywhere reduced to caricature. Stafford presents us with our familiar stereotypes, which is a way of preserving our prejudices, and her own."

Gelfant considers the novel "a brilliant and destructive tour de force..."

== Retrospective appraisal ==
The Mountain Lion is widely regarded as the best of Stafford's three novels.

Evelyn Toynton praises The Mountain Lion as Stafford's "one wholly successful novel.. Like so much of Stafford's finest work, it illuminates the sorrows of childhood with rare grace and elegance."

Novelist Joyce Carol Oates writes:

Though one would not want to stigmatize Stafford by suggesting that she is a writer's writer, [her] novels, particularly The Mountain Lion—a subtly and brilliantly realized tragedy of adolescence, told in a remarkably graceful and seemingly artless voice—remain highly regarded by other writers and substantiated early claims for Stafford's gifts.

== Bibliography ==
- Gelfant, Blanche H. 1979. "Revolutionary Turnings: 'The Mountain Lion'". The Massachusetts Review, Spring 1979, Vol. 20, No. 1, pp. 117-125. Retrieved February 24, 2026.
- Halverson, Cathryn. 2016. ""A Reading Problem": Margaret Lynn, Jean Stafford, and Literary Criticism of the American West". Legacy, Vol. 33, No. 1 (2016), pp. 127-149. University of Nebraska Press. Retrieved February 23, 2026.
- Howe, Irving. 1952. "Sensibility Troubles." The Kenyon Review, Spring, 1952, Vol. 14, No. 2, The Dante Number (Spring, 1952), pp. 345-348 Kenyon College. Retrieved February 23, 2026.
- Prescott, Orville. 1947. "Books of the Times". New York Times, March 3, 1947. Retrieved February 20, 2026.
- Stafford, Jean. 1972. Author's Note to The Mountain Lion. Farrar, Straus and Giroux, New York. ISBN 978-0374214029
- Toynton, Evelyn. 1991. "Books in Review: Jean Stafford: The Savage Heart by Charlotte Margolis Goodman". Salmagundi, No. 92 (Fall 1991), pp. 238-244. Skidmore College. JSTOR link. Retrieved February 20, 2026.
- Oates, Joyce Carol. 1988. "ADVENTURES IN ABANDONMENT". New York Times. August 28, 1988. Retrieved March 03, 2026.
