= The Heart of the Matter =

1948 novel by Graham Greene

- First edition
- Author: Graham Greene
- Language: English
- Genre: Novel
- Publisher: William Heinemann
- Publication date: 1948
- Publication place: United Kingdom
- Media type: Print (hardback & paperback)
- Pages: 297
- Preceded by: The Ministry of Fear (1943)
- Followed by: The Third Man (1950)

The Heart of the Matter (1948) is a novel by English author Graham Greene. The book details a life-changing moral crisis for Henry Scobie. Greene, a former British intelligence officer in Freetown, British Sierra Leone, drew on his experience there. Although Freetown is not mentioned in the novel, Greene confirms the location in his 1980 memoir, Ways of Escape.

The Heart of the Matter was enormously popular, selling more than 300,000 copies in the United Kingdom upon its release. It won the 1948 James Tait Black Memorial Prize for fiction. In 1998, the Modern Library ranked The Heart of the Matter 40th on its list of the 100 best English-language novels of the 20th century. In 2005, the novel was chosen by Time magazine as one of the one hundred best English-language novels from 1923 to the present. In 2012, it was shortlisted for the Best of the James Tait Black.

The book's title appears halfway through the novel: "If one knew, he wondered, the facts, would one have to feel pity even for the planets? If one reached what they called the heart of the matter?"

== Plot summary ==
Major Scobie lives in a colony on the west coast of Africa during World War II, and is responsible for local security during wartime. His wife Louise, an unhappy, solitary woman who loves literature and poetry, cannot make friends. Scobie feels responsible for her misery, but does not love her. Their only child, Catherine, died in England several years before. Louise is a devout Catholic. Scobie, a convert, is also devout.

Throughout the novel the oppressive nature of the climate is a major backdrop. The heat and humidity act as weakening factors.

Scobie is passed over for promotion to commissioner, which upsets Louise both for her personal ambition and her hope that the local British community will begin to accept her. Louise asks Scobie if she can go to live in South Africa to escape a life she hates.

At the same time, a new inspector, named Wilson, arrives in the town. He is priggish and socially inept, and hides his passion for poetry for fear of ostracism by his colleagues. He and Louise strike up a friendship, which Wilson mistakes for love. Wilson rooms with another colleague named Harris, who has created a sport for himself of killing the cockroaches that appear in his room each night. He invites Wilson to join him, but in the first match, they end up quarrelling over the rules of engagement.

One of Scobie's duties is to lead the inspections of local passenger ships, particularly looking for smuggled diamonds, a needle-in-a-haystack problem that never yields results. A Portuguese ship, the Esperança (the Portuguese word for 'hope'), comes into port, and a disgruntled steward reveals the location of a letter hidden in the captain's quarters. Scobie finds it, and because it is addressed to someone in Germany, he confiscates it, as it might contain secret codes and clandestine information. The captain says it is a letter to his daughter and begs Scobie to forget the incident, offering him a bribe of one hundred pounds when he learns that they share the Catholic faith. Scobie declines the bribe and takes the letter, but having opened and read it—contrary to regulations—and finding it innocuous, he decides not to submit it to higher authorities, and burns it.

Scobie is called to a small inland town to deal with the suicide of the local inspector, a man named Pemberton, who was in his early twenties and left a note implying that his suicide was due to a loan he could not repay. Scobie suspects the involvement of the local agent of a Syrian man named Yusef, a local black marketeer. Yusef denies it, but warns Scobie that the British have sent a new inspector specifically to look for diamonds; Scobie claims this is a hoax and that he does not know of any such man. Scobie later dreams that he is in Pemberton's situation, even writing a similar note, but when he awakens, he tells himself that he could never kill himself, as no cause is worth the eternal damnation that suicide would bring.

Scobie tries to secure a loan from the bank to pay the two hundred pound fare for Louise's passage, but is turned down. Yusef offers to lend Scobie the money at four per cent per annum. Scobie initially declines, but after an incident where he mistakenly thinks Louise is contemplating suicide, he accepts the loan and sends Louise to South Africa. Wilson meets them at the pier and tries to interfere with their parting.

Shortly afterwards, the survivors of a shipwreck arrive after forty days at sea in lifeboats. One young girl dies as Scobie tries to comfort her by pretending to be her father, who was killed in the wreck. A 19-year-old woman named Helen Rolt also arrives malnourished and dehydrated, clutching an album of postage stamps. She was married before the ship left port and is now a widow with a wedding ring too big for her finger. Scobie feels drawn to her, as much to the cherished album of stamps as to her physical presence, even though she is not beautiful. She reminds him of his daughter.

He soon starts a passionate affair with her, all the time aware that he is committing the grave sin of adultery. A letter he writes to Helen ends up in Yusef's hands, and the Syrian uses it to blackmail Scobie into sending a package of diamonds for him via the departing Esperança, thus avoiding the authorities.

After Louise unexpectedly returns, Scobie struggles to keep her ignorant of his love affair. But he is unable to renounce Helen, even in the confessional, where the priest instructs him to think it over and postpones absolution. Still, to placate his wife, Scobie attends Mass with her and receives communion in his state of mortal sin—a sacrilege according to Catholic doctrine. Soon after, Yusef's servant delivers a "gift" to Scobie, which he refuses. Scobie's servant, Ali, however, witnesses this and a romantic embrace between Scobie and Helen. Scobie visits Yusef to confront him about the gift, but also to relate his suspicion that Ali, whom he had trusted for all of their 15 years together, is disloyal. Yusef says he will take care of the matter, which within a few hours ends up with Ali being killed by local teenagers known as "wharf rats". The reader is led to believe that Yusef arranged the killing for which Scobie blames himself.

Having gone this far down the path of ruin and seeing no way out, Scobie decides to free everyone from himself—including God—and plots his death by faking a heart ailment and getting a prescription for sleeping pills. Knowing full well that suicide is the ultimate damnation according to Church doctrine, he kills himself with the pills. The act yields ambiguous results; Scobie tries to say an Act of Contrition, and tries to help a presence he feels is calling for aid, before he dies. Helen continues her dreary existence. And Louise, who knew about the affair all along, is made to realise by her suitor, Wilson, that Scobie's death was a suicide. She tells Wilson she will not marry him, but might in time.

The concluding chapter consists of a short encounter between Louise and her confessional priest. Louise tries to rationalize Scobie's suicide in relation to his Catholicism, to which the priest advises that no one can know what is in a person's heart or about God's mercy.

== Characters ==
- Major Henry Scobie – Longtime police deputy commissioner and protagonist of the novel.
- Louise Scobie – Henry's devout Catholic wife.
- Catherine Scobie – Deceased daughter of Henry and Louise.
- Ali – Scobie's longtime African servant.
- Edward Wilson – New inspector who spies on Major Scobie and is in love with his wife, Louise.
- Harris – Wilson's housemate
- "Dicky" Pemberton – Inspector who commits suicide due to his large debt to Yusef.
- Helen Rolt – Newly arrived widow who becomes Scobie's mistress.
- Yusef – Syrian local black marketeer who blackmails Scobie after finding a letter in which he expresses his love for Helen.
- Tallit – Catholic Syrian, Yusef's chief competitor.
- Father Rank – Local Catholic priest.
- Father Clay – Catholic priest at Bamba who reads about saints.

== Critical response ==
=== Contemporary reviews ===
Novelist and literary critic George Orwell, in the 17 July 1948 The New Yorker wrote:

The central idea of the book is that it is better to be an erring Catholic than a virtuous pagan…it is impossible not to feel a certain snobbishness in Mr. Greene's attitude, both here and in other books written from an explicitly Catholic standpoint. He appears to share the idea, floating around since Baudelaire, that there is something distingué in being damned; Hell is a sort of high-class night club, entry to which is reserved for Catholics only, since the others, non-Catholics, are too ignorant to be held guilty, like the beasts that perish.

Orwell added: “But all the while—drunken, lecherous, criminal, or damned outright—the Catholics retain their superiority, since alone they know the meaning of good and evil.”

Literary critic William DuBois in the July 11, 1948 issue of The New York Times describes Greene as "a profound moralist with a technique to match his purpose" and his protagonist, the policeman Scobie, as "a textbook case of a judge destroyed by his own sentences." DuBois offers the following passage to illustrate his characterization of The Heart of the Matter as a "parable" of a man who is "victim of his own acute kindness." Father Rank, the priest, visits Scobie's widow to offer condolences shortly after her husband's suicide:

[Mrs. Scobie]: "He was a bad Catholic."

"That's the silliest phrase in common use," Father Rank said.

"And in the end, this—horror. He must have known that he was damning himself."

"Yes, he knew that all right. He never had any trust in mercy—except for other people."

"It's no good even praying..."

Father Rank clapped the cover of the diary to and said, furiously, "For goodness' sake, Mrs. Scobie, don't imagine you— or I—know a thing about God's mercy."

"The Church says ..."

"I know what the Church says. The Church knows all the rules. But it doesn't know what goes on in a single human heart."

"You think there's some hope, then?" she wearily asked.

"Are you so bitter against him?"

"I haven't any bitterness left."

"And do you think God's likely to be more bitter than a woman?" he said with harsh insistence, but she winced away from the arguments of hope.

"Oh why, why, did he have to make such a mess of things?"

Father Rank said, "It may seem an odd thing to say—when a man's as wrong as he was—but I think, from what I saw of him, that he really loved God."

She had denied just now that she felt any bitterness, but a little more of it drained out now like tears from exhausted ducts. "He certainly loved no one else," she said.

"And you may be in the right of it there, too," Father Rank replied.

DuBois adds: "Such is Mr. Greene's parable: the reader will search far to find another novel that explores that basic malaise in such clinical depth—and with such compassion."

=== Later assessments ===
Writing in The Guardian, on 17 September 2010, literary critic D. J. Taylor places The Heart of the Matter within the legacy of the "Catholic novels" that began to appear in the mid-19th century, "born out of the Tractarian movement" and part of the "Catholic tradition in English letters." Taylor adds that "the real impetus to the Catholic novel's mid-[20th] century rise was provided by converts: Evelyn Waugh, Graham Greene and, slightly later, Muriel Spark." Taylor offers this observation on the critical response to these Catholic-inspired works:

Even Catholics found some of the complaints levelled at Waugh and Greene by their contemporary critics difficult to ignore. Even to certain believers, Waugh's Catholicism was a symptom of his pursuit of "smartness", that zealous romanticizing of upper-class English life in which Brideshead Revisited (1945) positively revels. Orwell's quarrel with Greene turned on the idea that the situations in which his characters found themselves were psychologically implausible. Scobie, in The Heart of the Matter, is, according to Orwell, incredible…But what exactly was being fought over here? Both Greene and Waugh believed that their characters' religious sensibilities gave them a dimension that most people in novels no longer possessed.

Taylor reports that "any religious novelist faces…the absolute necessity of opening up the exclusive private club to which you belong to the non-members who don't wear its tail-coats or drink its claret."

Literary critic Scott Bradfield in the 10 March 2021 The New Republic, considers The Heart of the Matter a "breakthrough" novel.:

Greene achieved international fame by appealing to Catholics who found in it an expression of living in a post–World War II world where God didn't seem to reward the faith they placed in Him.

Observing that "Greene's cynicism about the world—and the sufferings of humanity—came close to nihilism," Bradfield quotes protagonist Scobie from The Heart of the Matter: "Point me out the happy man and I will point you out either extreme egotism, evil—or else an absolute ignorance." Bradfield adds: "It’s hard to think of any similarly productive, commercial novelist today who speaks so vigorously against religious and political pieties."

== Film ==
The novel was made into a film in 1953, directed by George More O'Ferrall and starring Trevor Howard and Maria Schell, and a TV film version was produced in 1983, featuring Jack Hedley as Scobie. In the film, Scobie contemplates suicide but is actually killed trying to stop a brawl.

== Sources ==
- Bradfield, Scott. 2021. “Graham Greene Against the World” in The New Republic, March 10, 2021. https://newrepublic.com/article/161645/graham-greene-world-biography-book-review
- Breit, Harvey. 1949. An Interview with Evelyn Waugh. The New York Times, March 13, 1949.https://archive.nytimes.com/www.nytimes.com/books/97/05/04/reviews/waugh-interview.html
- DuBois, William. 1948. A Searching Novel of Man's Unpaid Debt to Man. The New York Times, July 11, 1948. https://archive.nytimes.com/www.nytimes.com/books/00/02/20/specials/greene-matter.html
- Orwell, George. 1948. “The Sanctified Sinner” in The New Yorker, July 17, 1948 from The 1940s: The Story of a Decade. 2014. The New Yorker Magazine, New York. Ed. Henry Finder. pp. 477–481. ISBN 9780812983296
- Taylor, D. J. 2010. “The heart of the matter” in The Guardian, September 17, 2010. https://www.theguardian.com/books/2010/sep/18/dj-taylor-catholic-novels
