= Elephi: The Cat with the High I.Q. =

Elephi, the Cat with the High I.Q.
- First edition
- Author: Jean Stafford
- Cover artist: Erik Blegvad
- Publisher: Farrar, Straus & Cudahy
- Publication date: September 1962
- Media type: Print (hardback)
- Pages: 77
- OCLC: 41806618

Elephi, the Cat with the High I.Q. is a children's book by Jean Stafford published in 1962 by Farrar, Straus & Cudahy. A paperback version was issued in 1962 by Dover Publications.

== Publication background ==
Elephi, the Cat with the High I.Q. was written for publisher Farrar, Straus & Cudahy and unbeknownst to Random House, who had previously contracted Stafford to produce a major work of fiction: a sequel to her novel Boston Adventure (1944).

Stafford received a modest advance of $1000 for the story and a 5 percent royalty. The book was published in September of 1962.

Elephi, the Cat with the High I.Q. sold fewer than three thousand copies. Stafford declined to write a sequel to the book when she found the advance offer unsatisfactory.

== Retrospective appraisal ==
Reviewers at Cosmic Dream Farm highly recommend the book: "What an absolutely captivating, comical and clever story written by a woman who obviously was intimate with cat psychology. If you love cats, you will love this book."

Jean Stafford biographer David Roberts calls the work "an utter delight."

== Sources ==
- Roberts, David. "Jean & Joe: The Stafford-Liebling Marriage". The American Scholar, Summer 1988, Vol. 57, No. 3 , pp. 373-391 The Phi Beta Kappa Society. Accessed February 23, 2026.
- Stafford, Jean. 1962. Elephi, the Cat with the High I.Q. Farrar, Straus & Cudahy, New York.
- Wilson, Mary Ann. 1996. Jean Stafford: A Study of the Short Fiction. Twayne Publishers. Simon & Schuster, New York. ISBN 0-8057-7807-1
