= Children Are Bored on Sunday =

1953 book by Jean Stafford

- First edition
- Author: Jean Stafford
- Language: English
- Genre: Short story collection
- Publisher: Harcourt, Brace & Co.
- Publication date: 1953
- Publication place: United States
- Media type: Print (hardback)
- Pages: 252
- OCLC: 290015

Children Are Bored on Sunday is a collection of short fiction by Jean Stafford published in 1953 by Harcourt, Brace & Co.

== Stories ==
- "The Echo and the Nemesis" (The New Yorker, December 16, 1950, as "The Nemesis")
- "A Country Love Story" (The New Yorker, May 6, 1950)
- "A Summer Day" (The New Yorker, September 4, 1948)
- "The Maiden" (The New Yorker, April 29, 1950)
- "The Home Front" (Partisan Review, Spring 1945)
- "Between the Porch and the Altar" (Harper's Magazine, June 1945)
- "The Bleeding Heart" (Partisan Review, September 1948)
- "The Interior Castle" (Partisan Review, November–December 1946)
- "A Modest Proposal" (The New Yorker, July 23, 1949, as "Pax Vobiscum")
- "Children Are Bored on Sunday" (The New Yorker, February 14, 1948)

== Reception ==
Reviewer William Peden in the New York Times praised the collection as a welcome addition to her three novels, terming the stories "meaningful and complex."

Literary critic Ihab Hassan in Western Review places the best stories in the volume within the tradition of James Joyce and Anton Chekov:

The intimate glimpse unresolved, the moment of sudden knowledge, the reversal of a situation, the symbolic crisis, the humour of innocence and perversity, find each some deft application in Jean Stafford's stories."

== Retrospective appraisal ==
Stafford's novels and short stories "collectively merit her a place among the finest fiction writers of her generation."

Writing in Shenandoah, critic Jerome Mazzaro in comparing Stafford's work to Marcel Proust's, singles out "A Country Love Story" as a "classic statement" of her thematic concerns.

== Sources ==
- Hassan, Ihab. "Jean Stafford: The Expense of Style and the Scope of Sensibility," Western Review 19, Spring 1955 pp. 185–203 in Jean Stafford: A Study of the Short Fiction. 1996. Twayne's Publishing, New York. pp. 109–114. ISBN 0-8057-7807-1
- Mazzaro, Jerome. "Rememberances of Things Proust" (a review of Jean Stafford's Bad Characters), Shenandoah 16, Summer 1965. pp. 114–117. Washington and Lee University Review.
- Peden, William. "A Bleak, Sad World; CHILDREN ARE BORED ON SUNDAY." New York Times, May 10, 1953. https://www.nytimes.com/1953/05/10/archives/a-bleak-sad-world-children-are-bored-on-sunday-by-jean-stafford-252.html Accessed 12 February 2026.
- Stafford, Jean. 1953. The Children Are Bored on Sunday. Harcourt, Brace & Co, New York. OCLC 290015
- Stafford, Jean. 1984. The Collected Stories of Jean Stafford. E. P. Dutton, New York. ISBN 0-525-48101-X
- Wilson, Mary Ann. 1996. Jean Stafford: A Study of the Short Fiction. Twayne's Publishing. Simon & Schuster, New York. ISBN 0-8057-7807-1
