= A Mother in History =

1966 essay

- First edition
- Author: Jean Stafford
- Publisher: Farrar Straus & Giroux
- Publication date: 1966
- Media type: Print (hardback)
- Pages: 121
- ISBN: 978-0374213725

A Mother in History is an essay by Jean Stafford published in 1966 by Farrar Straus & Giroux.

In her only non-fiction book, Stafford adapted the methods of the New Journalism to present a series of interviews with Marguerite Oswald, mother of Lee Harvey Oswald, in the aftermath of the John F. Kennedy assassination.

The title of the piece is derived from Marguerite Oswald's characterization of herself as "a mother in history."

== Publication background ==
The article was initially commissioned by McCall's in 1965 to assemble a series of interviews with Marguerite Oswald, mother of Lee Harvey Oswald, the latter widely regarded at the time as the lone assassin in the murder of US President John Fitzgerald Kennedy an expansion of a commissioned 1965 McCall's article based on a three-day interview with Marguerite Oswald."

== Reception ==
"A Mother in History, with its controversial subject and its impassioned responses, is a fascinating example of Jean Stafford's adaptation of her skills as a fiction writer to a new, personal form of journalism...What the biographers do agree on is the similarity of Mrs. Oswald to Stafford's own eccentric fictional characters."—Literary critic Maureen Ryan in The Kenyon Review (Autumn, 1994).

Popular reaction to the book was positive. The hardback edition sold ten thousand copies in the first three months after its release.

Critical response was largely negative, in part due to Stafford's idiosyncratic application of the New Journalism methodology, substituting the third-person point-of-view for her own editorial voice.

Time panned A Mother of History, calling it "by far Stafford's most thoroughly unpleasant book—perhaps the most abrasively unpleasant book in recent years—and it required no writing talent at all."

American Heritage, in a 1992 review of the Pharos Books reissue of A Mother In History, provided quotes by Marguerite Oswald, "the assassin's mother", which serve as their own indictment of Lee Harvey Oswald who "acting alone, had killed John F. Kennedy."

== Sources ==
- Ryan, Maureen. "Green Visors and Ivory Towers: Jean Stafford and the New Journalism". The Kenyon Review, Autumn, 1994, New Series, Vol. 16, No. 4 pp. 104-119. Kenyon College. Accessed February 17, 2026.
- Wilson, Mary Ann. 1996. Jean Stafford: A Study of the Short Fiction. Twayne Publishers. Simon & Schuster, New York. ISBN 0-8057-7807-1
