= And Lots of Solid Color =

- Short story by Jean Stafford

Publication
- Published in: American Prefaces
- Media type: Literary journal
- Publication date: November 1939

"And Lots of Solid Color" is a short story by Jean Stafford published in American Prefaces (November 1939). The story is among Stafford's uncollected works.

A minor piece in her oeuvre, "And Lots of Solid Color" is notable as Stafford's first story to appear in print.

== Plot ==
"And Lots of Solid Color" is presented as first-person narrative by its protagonist, Marie. The events describe a single day in her life.

Marie is a young woman who recently graduated from college. She has returned to Oregon to live with her parents and Aunt Eva while she anxiously seeks employment as a writer. Her efforts have so far proved futile: she has garnered nothing but rejection letters in the mail, a fact over which she obsesses. Marie's father has struggled aimlessly for years to create a best-seller and failed; she suspects that her aspirations, too, are doomed.

Compounding these self-doubts is Aunt Eva, who disparages her niece's college education and maligns all literary pursuits as pointless. In her despair, Marie retreats to vivid memories of a childhood trip to Mexico. There she was enchanted by the brightly painted houses and their decorative furnishings.

The story closes with Marie receiving yet another rejection letter.

== Theme ==
"And Lots of Solid Color"— as do a number of Stafford's short stories —"ends with characters accepting a life of compromise, accommodation, or at best, dreams of escape."

== Sources ==
- Wilson, Mary Ann. 1996. Jean Stafford: A Study of the Short Fiction. Twayne Publishers. Simon & Schuster, New York. ISBN 0-8057-7807-1
- Stafford, Jean. "And Lots of Solid Color". American Prefaces 5, November 1939. pp. 22-25.
