= The Captain's Gift =

- Short story by Jean Stafford
- Country: United States
- Language: English

Publication
- Published in: The Sewanee Review
- Publication type: Literary journal
- Media type: Print (magazine)
- Publication date: April 1946

"The Captain's Gift" is a short story by Jean Stafford. It was originally published as "The Present" in The Sewanee Review (April 1946), and first collected in Bad Characters (1964) by Farrar, Straus and Giroux.

== Plot ==
"The Captain's Gift" is told from a third-person point-of-view by a reliable narrator. Mrs. Ramsey is the focal character.

The story opens on a pleasant spring day in a residential area of a small American town. The neighborhood, once an exclusive abode for the upper-middle-class, is now occupied by the poor working class—many of them European immigrants.

The elderly Mrs. Chester Ramsey, widow of General Chester Ramsey, lives alone in one of the last Edwardian homes in the area. The neighborhood swarms with families and children, socializing and enjoying the weather. Mrs. Ramsey's friends, who have moved uptown, refer to them as "riffraff." Mrs. Ramsey insists on remaining in the realm of her childhood; she still lives in the Belle Époque, dressing in the attire of her mother's generation. Little of modern society has penetrated her consciousness. She is largely invisible to her neighbors, and she observes them with benign condescension.

Before World War II, Mrs. Ramsey, now in her seventies, invited well-bred young men to her parlor for tea or lunch; these men are now serving overseas in the armed forces. Her daughter is a Red Cross supervisor, her granddaughters serving as WAVES, her grandson an Army flight instructor. Though all of her offspring are deeply committed to the war efforts, Mrs. Ramsey remains detached from current events. As such, she still imagines the architectural monuments, museums and cathedrals of Europe to be intact, despite the carpet bombing by allied forces. She takes particular pleasures in corresponding with numerous young soldiers and sailors. Their friendly responses do not challenge her obliviousness to the war.

A special delivery package arrives from overseas by her favorite grandson, Arthur, who has recently reported he is "somewhere in Germany." Delighted, she opens the box, and out drops a severed braid of blonde hair, very long, and tied with pink bow. Resting on the floor, it resembles "a living snake."

Mrs. Ramsey is disturbed by the "gift", and quickly distracts herself by contemplating whether a bouquet of her African violets need replacing. She remarks with reproach: "How unkind!" Nonetheless, Arthur's voice delivers a rejoinder from her subconscious: "There's a war on, hadn't you heard?"

== Theme ==
The story is set during the events of WWII, Captain Cousins and his company have been operating in Germany during final weeks of The Holocaust, the severed hair serves as a "brutal reminder of a war whose atrocities were only too real."

Mrs. Chester Ramsey's "strategic retreat from life" has rendered her incapable of fathoming the circumstances under which the "braid of golden hair" might have been obtained. Nor can she recognize the "profound change" that her grandson has undergone through his war experiences.

She finds the "gift" merely offensive, and chides her grandson out loud to the empty parlour for his breach of etiquette: "How unfriendly, Arthur!...How unkind!" As if in reaction to her petulant reproach, there issues a stern reply: "[A]s if there were a voice in the hair at her feet, she distinctly hears him saying 'There's a war on, haven't you heard?'" Though the "exact source" of the human artifact escapes Mrs. Ransey in her self-imposed innocence, the reader who possesses a knowledge of the European war may surmise its origins.

Literary critic Marueen Ryan] notes that "war inspired nihilism and loss of faith in human ideals reverberate throughout" on several of Stafford's stories including "The Captain's Gift."

Author Joyce Carol Oates, commenting on "The Captain's Gift," faults Stafford for crafting a story "marred by an arch, over-written self-consciousness, too elaborate, too artificial, to have arisen from the fable at hand."

== Sources ==
- Oates, Joyce Carol. "The Interior Castle: The Art of Jean Stafford's Short Fiction". Shenandoah 30 (Winter 1979) pp. 61-62 in Jean Stafford: A Study of the Short Fiction. Twayne Publishers. Simon & Schuster, New York. pp. 136-139. ISBN 0-8057-7807-1
- Ryan, Maureen. 1987. Innocence and Estrangement in the Fiction of Jean Stafford. Louisiana State University Press, ISBN 978-0807113813 in Jean Stafford: A Study of the Short Fiction. Twayne Publishers. Simon & Schuster, New York. pp. 143-147. ISBN 0-8057-7807-1
- Stafford, Jean. 1984. The Collected Stories of Jean Stafford. E. P. Dutton, New York. ISBN 0-525-48101-X
- Wilson, Mary Ann. 1996. Jean Stafford: A Study of the Short Fiction. Twayne Publishers, Simon & Schuster, New York. ISBN 0-8057-7807-1
