= The Maiden (short story) =

- Short story by Jean Stafford
- Country: United States
- Language: English

Publication
- Published in: The New Yorker
- Publication type: Literary journal
- Media type: Print (magazine)
- Publication date: April 29, 1950

"The Maiden" is a short story by Jean Stafford originally appearing in The New Yorker (April 29, 1950) and first collected in Children Are Bored on Sunday (1953) by Harcourt & Brace.

== Plot ==
"To paraphrase a comment once made by James Branch Cabell, Jean Stafford seems to have dedicated herself to writing beautifully about unbeautiful matters."—Literary critic William Peden in the New York Times, May 10, 1953.

"The Maiden" is presented from a third-person omniscient point-of-view by a reliable narrator. Evan Leckie is the focal character.

The story is set in post-WWII Germany. Leckie, a journalist, has recently arrived in Heidelberg from Nuremberg where the trials of Nazi leaders for war crimes is underway. Germany lies in ruins, and is under international military occupation. Leckie is attending a dinner party of affluent Americans and formerly well-to-do Germans. The company is sociable, but the Americans make no secret that they are enjoying buying up art and furnishing for a fraction of their worth. Fine wines and liqueurs are freely served.

Leckie—recently experiencing a bitter separation from his wife—is deeply moved by a middle-aged German couple, Dr. Reinmuth and his spouse Frau Liselotte Reinmuth. By all indications, the aging Reinmuths are still deeply in love. Leckie is particularly impressed with Frau Reinmuth's demeanor; she seems to have remained detached from the horrors of the Third Reich. Leckie finds touching the nostalgia she feels for her pre-war existence . He asks himself how the horrors of this regretful war had come about with such exemplary German as the Reinmuths.

When the topic of Nuremberg is mentioned, Herr Reinmuth remarks only that he and Liselotte had lived there long before the war while still in their youth, rather than a place of contemporary reckoning with the perpetrators of genocide. During the course of the evening, Herr Reinmuth and the American Judge Crowell exchange amusing anecdotes about their careers, This prompts Herr Reinmuth, himself once a judge, to share a tale from his early career. Frau Reinmuth urges him to do so: "It is such an extraordinary story of a young lawyer's first case." His client was a man who had confessed to killing an elderly woman and stealing from the small sum of sixty pfennig. His defense was proforma, as the man was automatically condemned to death. Herr Reinmuth was invited to attend the execution by guillotining. He describes the highly ritualistic performance of the public event in complacent detail, bemused at how the blood spurted out the victim's neck when his head was severed.

Most of the Americans are dismayed that Dr. Reinmusth takes satisfaction in sharing the story, while others are clearly disgusted. When asked whether he had fainted at the sight of the blood, Herr Reimuth, emphatically denies it; rather, he had immediately rushed to the home of young Liselotte and asked her to marry him. Herr Reimuth looked upon her husband adoringly as the story ends.

The stunned Americans fall silent. Judge Cromwell remarks cynically that he had thought that death by guillotine had been obsolete for generations, the last performed in Edinburg with an ancient device: "They call it The Maiden." Herr Reinmuth calmly finishes his wine and responds "It was nectar and I've drunk it all. Sic transit gloria mundi." (Thus passes the glory of the world).

== Theme ==
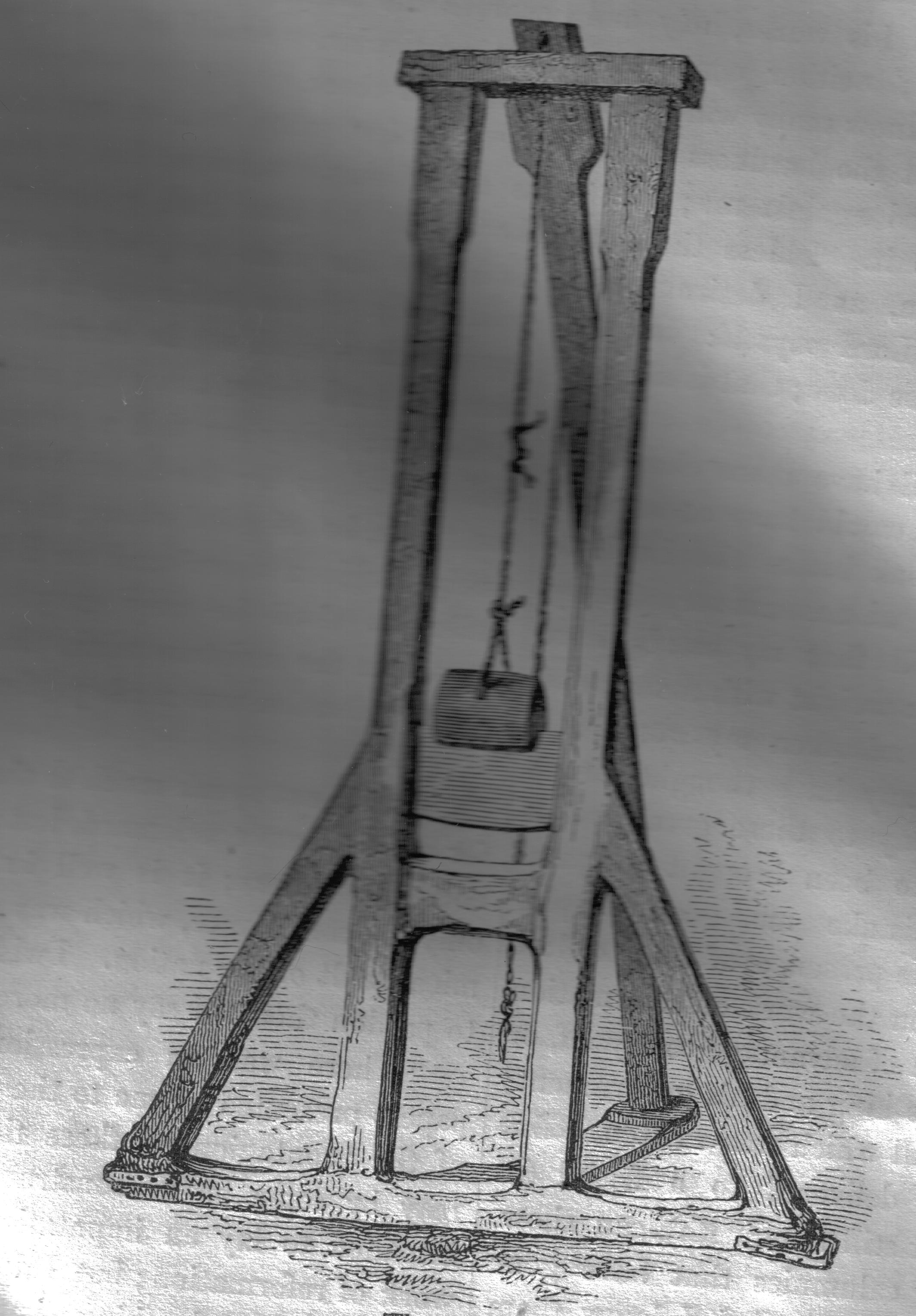
"The Maiden" —Scottish guillotine

.Biographer Mary Ann Wilson notes the "immense cultural divide" revealed by Herr Reinmuth's tale: "[T]he Americans are shocked and repelled by the brutality under the thin layer of civilization, the Germans apparently oblivious of anything contradictory in their bevanior."

The protagonist, Evan Leckie, is left to reconcile his initial feelings of admiration for Frau Reinmuth's devotion to her husband's with his conflation of the gruesome execution that inspired Reinmuth to propose marriage. Stafford arranges a convergence of "sexuality, love, and death to dramatize Leckies' epiphany.

Literary critic Olga W. Vickery observes that Leckie's admiration of the Reinmuth's "capacity of love in an unloving world' is gravely disabused when he discovers that it "had its origin in the totentanz, in the sexual excitation of observing the execution of a petty criminal." Author Joyce Carol Oates quotes from a key passage in Dr. Reinmuth's description of the execution that so appalls the American dinner party guests, and the grisly details of death by guillotine that he recounts with gusto:

"One, he was horizontal! Two, the blade descended! Three, the head was off the carcass and the blood shot out from the neck like a volcano, a geyser, a flame from an explosion...I did not faint. You remember this was a beautiful day in spring? And that I was a young man all dressed up at seven in the morning?...I took the train to Furth, Germany and I called my sweetheart: "I know it's an unusual time of day to call, but I have something unusual to say. Will you marry me?"

== Sources ==
- Oates, Joyce Carol. "The Interior Castle: The Art of Jean Stafford's Short Fiction". Shenandoah 30 (Winter 1979) pp. 61-62 in Jean Stafford: A Study of the Short Fiction. Twayne Publishers. Simon & Schuster, New York. pp. 136-139. ISBN 0-8057-7807-1
- Peden, William. 1953. "https://www.nytimes.com/1953/05/10/archives/a-bleak-sad-world-children-are-bored-on-sunday-by-jean-stafford-252.html A Bleak, Sad World; CHILDREN ARE BORED ON SUNDAY." New York Times, May 10, 1953. Accessed February 12, 2026.
- Ryan, Maureen. 1987. Innocence and Estrangement in the Fiction of Jean Stafford. Louisiana State University Press, ISBN 978-0807113813 in Jean Stafford: A Study of the Short Fiction. Twayne Publishers. Simon & Schuster, New York. pp. 143-147. ISBN 0-8057-7807-1
- Stafford, Jean. 1984. The Collected Stories of Jean Stafford. E. P. Dutton, New York. ISBN 0-525-48101-X
- Vickery, Olga W. 1962. "Jean Stafford and the Ironic Vision" South Atlantic Quarterly, 61:4. Duke University Press in Jean Stafford: A Study of Short Fiction. Twayne Publishers, Simon & Schuster, New York. pp. 115-118. ISBN 0-8057-7807-1
- Wilson, Mary Ann. 1996. Jean Stafford: A Study of Short Fiction. Twayne Publishers. Simon & Schuster, New York. ISBN 0-8057-7807-1
