= Boston Adventure =

1944 novel by Jean Stafford

- First edition
- Author: Jean Stafford
- Publisher: Harcourt Brace & Company
- Publication date: 1944
- Media type: Print (hardback)
- Pages: 496

Boston Adventure is a 1944 novel by Jean Stafford. It was her first published novel and was a surprise best-seller, launching her career as a writer.

Set shortly before World War II, it tells the story of Sonia Marburg, who grew up in Chichester, a small fishing village on the North Shore facing Boston. Deserted by her father and burdened with an insane mother, she dreams of life on the imagined splendor of Beacon Hill, a rich neighborhood in Boston. When she becomes the protegee of a wealthy Bostonian as a teenager her dream is achieved, but with it comes the revelation of an empty, decadent society.

== Reception ==
Critic Marguerite Young at The Kenyon Review (Autumn 1944) found the novel appealing for its sophistication: “[W]ritten with incisive, painstaking delicacy, as if an insect recorded those minutiae which escape the average eye…a delightful novel.”

New York Times reviewer Orville Prescott, commenting on the novel almost three years after its publication, compares it unfavorably to Stafford’s newly released novel The Mountain Lion (1947). Prescott considers Boston Adventure, though “impressive,” overrated by critics: “[I]mitative, overwrought, overstuffed with repetitious material and abusive rather than penetrating in its social satire.”

Reviewer Ruth Page at the New York Times (September 24, 1944) is impressed with the accomplishment of Stafford’s prose, delivering “imagery of symbolic value.”

== Retrospective appraisal ==
Biographer Mary Ann Wilson observes the “Boston Adventure and The Mountain Lion (1947) anticipate later feminist issues of female self-definition, powerlessness, and socially constructed gender roles…”

Writing in Salmagundi, literary critic Evelyn Toynton remarks that Boston Adventure is “the least artistically interesting of Stafford’s three novels and the only one to become a best-seller.”

Author Joyce Carol Oates remarks that of Stafford's three well-received novels only ""Boston Adventure, her first, sold well—it was in fact a best seller, reaching 400,000 copies; and this despite the novel's literary manner, its resolutely old-fashioned language that advances the narrative by slow grudging degrees.”

== Sources ==
- Oates, Joyce Carol. 1988. “ADVENTURES IN ABANDONMENT” New York Times. August 18, 1988. https://www.nytimes.com/1988/08/28/books/adventures-in-abandonment-37388.html Accessed 3 March 2026.
- Page, Ruth. “Some Proustian Images of Boston; BOSTON ADVENTURE. By Jean Stafford.” New York Times, September 24, 1944. https://www.nytimes.com/1944/09/24/archives/some-proustian-images-of-boston-boston-adventure-by-jean-stafford.html Accessed 20 February 2026.*Roberts, David. 1988. “Jean & Joe: The Stafford-Liebling Marriage.” The American Scholar, Summer 1988, Vol. 57, No. 3, pp. 373–391 The Phi Beta Kappa Society https://www.jstor.org/stable/41211547 Accessed 23 February 2026.
- Prescott, Orville. 1947. Books of the Times. New York Times, March 3, 1947. https://www.nytimes.com/1947/03/03/archives/books-of-the-times.html Accessed 20 February 2026.
- Stafford, Jean. 1944. Boston Adventure. Harcourt Brace & Company, New York. OCLC 9489073
- Toynton, Evelyn. 1991. Books in Review: Jean Stafford: The Savage Heart by Charlotte Margolis Goodman. Salmagundi, No. 92 (Fall 1991), pp. 238–244. Skidmore College. https://www.jstor.org/stable/40548324 Accessed 20 February 2026.*Young, Marguerite. 1944. Review: “The Dusty Interiors of Boston.” The Kenyon Review, Vol. 6, No. 4 (Autumn, 1944), pp. 662–666. Kenyon College .https://www.jstor.org/stable/4332555 Accessed February 20, 2026.
- Wilson, Mary Ann. 1996. Jean Stafford: A Study of the Short Fiction. Twayne Publishers. Simon & Schuster, New York. ISBN 0-8057-7807-1
