= A Country Love Story =

- Short story by Jean Stafford

Publication
- Publisher: The New Yorker
- Media type: Literary journal
- Publication date: May 6, 1950

"A Country Love Story" is a short story by Jean Stafford originally appearing in The New Yorker (May 6, 1950) and first collected in Children Are Bored on Sunday (1953) by Harcourt, Brace & Co.

The work is ranked among Stafford's finest stories.

== Plot ==
"A Country Love Story" is told by an omniscient third-person narrator. May is the focal character. Daniel and May are an affluent Boston couple who, on the recommendation of Dr. Tellenbach, have purchased a property in the countryside. Daniel, a university history professor, has recently been released from a sanitarium for an unspecified mental disorder under Tellenbach's care. A rural environment is expected to provide Daniel an escape from the strain of academia so as to concentrate on his writing. Daniel is about to turn fifty. May, age thirty, disputed Dr. Tellenbach assessment; she insisted Daniel needed social contact after his prolonged isolation. The doctor condescendingly dismissed her objections in the interests of his patient.

Arriving in summer, May and Daniel stay busy refurbishing the property. As fall sets in, Daniel retires upstairs to concentrate on his writing. May finds herself with nothing to do; she feels she has been exiled with her husband. May cooks for them and goes for walks alone. Daniel is increasingly remote, and reacts defensively when May shares her sense of isolation and their lack of intimacy. They only meet briefly to consume meals together.

Christmas Day arrives. In response to May's casual remark concerning the snow-covered derelict sleigh, Daniel flies into a rage, accusing her of trying to drive him back into the sanitarium; "It was wonderful, wasn't it, for you while I was gone?" Daniel further insinuates that she had had lovers during his absence, and adds rhetorically "Are you going mad?" May sobs in anguish.

This brutal verbal assault leads May to believe that she may actually be guilty of having betrayed Daniel. Withdrawing into a fantasy world, she imaginatively manufactures a man; handsome, considerate, clever and with impeccable social skills. Once created, she falls in love with him and is utterly dependent on him for companionship.

In a rare expression of affection, Daniel gives May a kiss, musing out loud as to what precisely she had done to cause this domestic crisis. Despairing, May suspects both she and her spouse are mutually insane. May cannot deny that she is cheating on Daniel with her fantasy man and suspects her husband knows her secret. She suffers daily from his emotional absence. Months pass and spring approaches. Daniel commiserates with May's isolation, and tells her there is no shame if she decides to enter a sanitarium.

May observes her fantasy lover sitting on the sleigh. He appears as a tall, slim young man with fair hair wearing a red silk scarf. His pallor reminds her of an invalid. She only knows that she loves him. That night May dreams of being in a canoe with him. The lover touches her shoulder gently with the paddle:

"May? May? I love you May."

"Oh!" enchanted, she heard her voice replying. "Oh, I love you, too!"

"The winter is over, May. You must forgive the hallucinations of a sick man."

May awakes beside Daniel, who declares his love for her and pleads "If I am ever sick again, don't leave me, May."

Looking through the window at the abandoned sleigh, she laments that she will never see her lover again. She goes outside and sits on the seat of the sleigh and "wondering over and over again how she would live the rest of her life."

== Theme ==
Isolation and its pernicious effects is the central thematic element in the story. Daniel's relapse into illness as winter sets in, plunges May into physical isolation on their remote property; his detachment and cruel accusations of faithlessness further drive her to despair.

Literary critic Mary Ann Wilson offers the following passage that illustrates "May's unstable world."

But she did not disturb Daniel in his private musings; she held her tongue, and out of the corner of her eye she watched him watch the winter cloak the sleigh, and, as if she were computing a difficult sum in her head, she tried to puzzle what it was that had stilled tongues that earlier, before Daniel's illness, had found the days too short to communicate all they were eager to say.

Author Joyce Carol Oates detects a tragic irony in the story. Whereas Daniel emerges from his madness, May descends into a state of irredeemable alienation: "[By] the stories end, she and Daniel have traded places."

=== The antique sleigh ===
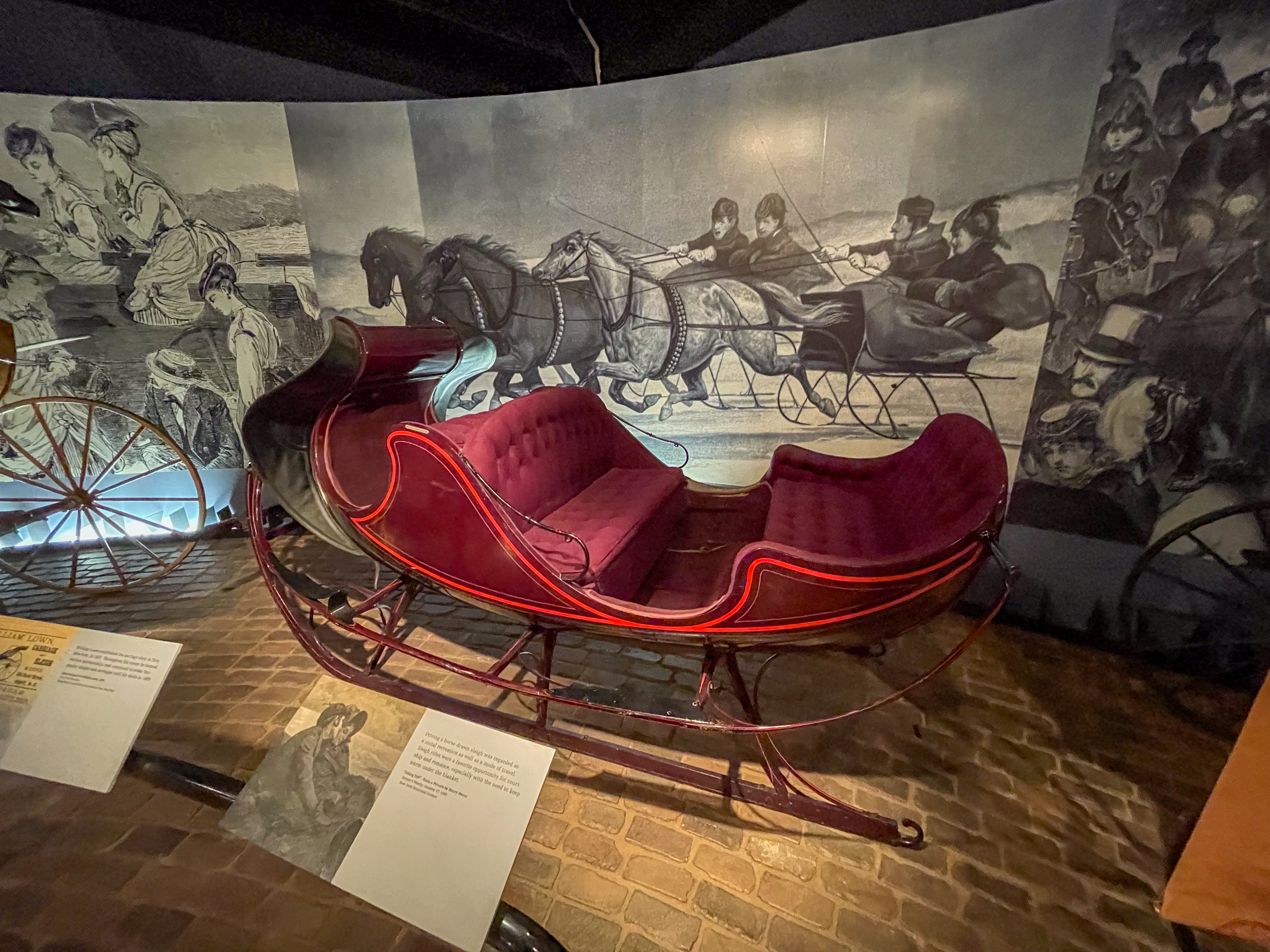
Vis-a-vis Sleigh, about 1880. William Lown, Troy, New York.

Stafford introduces a key symbolic device with the once stylish 19th century sleigh eroding for generations in the front yard. The antique sleigh "serves as a focal point and symbol both as leaden passing of time and for the inertia May and Daniel experience in this juncture in their married life." Ultimately, the antique sleigh "becomes the very vehicle of madness."

Literary critic Philip Stevick notes the symbolic function of the sleigh that contrasts two domains commonly featured in literature: the man-made world and the world of nature, representing the "man-nature dichotomy."

[W]e know, even from the first sentence, that the presence of the sleigh, immobile and non-functional, will be made into a metaphor for the presence of man in the world.

== Sources ==
- Hassan, Ihab. 1955. "Jean Stafford: The Expense of Style and the Scope of Sensibility," Western Review 19, Spring 1955 pp. 185–203 in Jean Stafford: A Study of the Short Fiction. 1996. Twayne Publishers, New York. pp. 109–114. ISBN 0-8057-7807-1
- Nettels, Elsa. 1994. "Thwarted Escapes: 'Ethan Frome' and Jean Stafford's 'A Country Love Story." Wharton Review, Fall 1994, Vol. 11, No. 2, pp. 6-8. Penn State University. https://www.jstor.org/stable/43512843 Accessed 17 February 2026.
- Oates, Joyce Carol. 1965. "Review: Notions Good and Bad Reviewed Work(s): Sometimes a Great Notion by Ken Kesey: Bad Characters by Jean Stafford: Cabot Wright Begins by James Purdy." The Kenyon Review, Winter, 1965, Vol. 27, No. 1, pp. 175–180. Published by: Kenyon College https://www.jstor.org/stable/4334526 Accessed 17 February 2026.
- Oates, Joyce Carol. 1988. "ADVENTURES IN ABANDONMENT" New York Times. August 18, 1988. https://www.nytimes.com/1988/08/28/books/adventures-in-abandonment-37388.html Accessed 3 March 2026.
- Stafford, Jean. 1984. The Collected Stories of Jean Stafford. E. P. Dutton, New York. ISBN 0-525-48101-X
- Stevick, Philip. 1981. "Alternative Pleasures: Postrealist Fiction and the Tradition." University of Illinois Press in Jean Stafford: A Study of the Short Fiction. Twayne Publishers. Simon & Schuster, New York. pp. 140–142. ISBN 0-8057-7807-1
- Wilson, Mary Ann. 1996. Jean Stafford: A Study of the Short Fiction. Twayne Publishers. Simon & Schuster, New York. ISBN 0-8057-7807-1
