= David Roberts (novelist) =

English editor and novelist (1944–2025)

- Born: 1944
- Died: 18 December 2025 (aged 80–81)
- Occupations: Editor and novelist

David Roberts (1944 – 18 December 2025) was an English editor and novelist.

Roberts worked for several years as a book editor at Chatto and Windus, Weidenfeld & Nicolson, and Michael O'Mara Books. Since 2000, he had been a full-time writer, best known for a series of crime novels set during the late 1930s, and featuring the joint adventures of Lord Edward Corinth and Verity Browne. The novels use actual historical events as a backdrop and there is an Author's Note at the back of the books briefly outlining what happened to the historical characters subsequently.

Publishers Weekly described his novels as "well-researched" and "first-rate fun".

Robets died aged 81 on 18 December 2025.

== Bibliography ==
Lord Edward Corinth and Verity Browne series:

1. Sweet Poison (2001)
2. Bones of the Buried (2001)
3. Hollow Crown (2002)
4. Dangerous Sea (2003)
5. The More Deceived (2004)
6. A Grave Man (2005)
7. The Quality of Mercy (2006)
8. Something Wicked (2007)
9. No More Dying (2008)
10. Sweet Sorrow (2009)
