= In the Zoo =

Short story by Jean Stafford

- Short story by Jean Stafford
- Country: United States
- Language: English

Publication
- Publication type: Literary journal
- Publisher: The New Yorker
- Media type: Print (magazine)
- Publication date: September 19, 1953

"In the Zoo" is a short story by Jean Stafford originally appearing in The New Yorker (September 19, 1953) and first collected in Bad Characters (1964) published by Farrar, Straus and Giroux.

The story won the O. Henry Memorial Award in 1955.

== Plot ==
"In the Zoo" is told primarily from a first-person point-of-view by a reliable, but unnamed female narrator. The opening and closing sections of the story are written in the present tense, while the long middle section is presented in a flashback and the past tense.

The middle-aged narrator and her sister Daisy, two years her senior, are Colorado residents. They are visiting the Denver zoo, and Daisy recalls a Mr. Murphy, a figure from their childhood. The narrator events surrounding the man she remembers as "our only friend" when the girls were ten- and eight-years-old, respectively. The sisters became orphans at that age, and were sent to live with a childhood friend of their paternal grandmother, a Mrs. Placer. This elderly woman, whom they addressed as "Gran", was a childless widow who ran a cheap boarding house for local workers and retirees. She collected a modest life insurance award provided by the girl's deceased father and mother to compensate for raising them.

The boarding house contained a rogue's gallery of disaffected pessimists, of which Mrs. Placer was the chief misanthrope. She and her boarders gathered daily to register grievances toward community members, high and low: no one was spared their enmity. When Gran encouraged her wards, whom she considered insufficiently mean-spirited, to disdain the locals, she succeeded only in deepening the children's social isolation. The girls were pitied by the community. Mr. Murphy was a middle-aged alcoholic who lives alone with a menagerie of beloved pets: a Capuchin monkey, a de-ordorized skunk, a parrot who spoke only French obscenities, and a coyote. The girls became friends with the gentle hermit and his animals. Murphy' s gentle, easy-going demeanor concealed a volatile streak when it came to protecting his animals, demonstrated when a boy molested the pet skunk: Murphy flew into an apoplectic rage, and assaulted the youth. When Mr. Murphy came into possession of a puppy, he offered to give it to the girls: Gran consented, but only after she considered its potential as a watchdog.

Loving by nature, and gentle with the girls, Laddy was quickly transformed by Mrs. Placer's rigorous training into a dangerously vicious canine, devoted only to her. Door-to-door salesmen fled the premises in panic, newspaper boys ceased to deliver the papers, and even a boarder was intimidated into departing. Mrs. Placer altered the dog's name to Caesar, who now slept at the foot of her bed. When police attempted to investigate complaints, Mrs. Placer appeared with Caesar muzzled, and the matter was dropped.

Daisy and her sister were reluctant to inform Mr. Murphy about the fate of Laddy. When he discovered the truth at a local tavern, Murphy took action. With the girls in tow, he arrived at the boarding house, with his favorite monkey on his shoulder. Gran appeared at her screen door with Caesar. Murphy and Mrs. Placer silently regarded one another. She suddenly flung open the door and Caesar raced out, ripping the monkey from Murphy's shoulder and snapping its neck with its jaws. Mrs. Placer remarked "Why Caesar, you scamp! You've hurt Mr. Murphy's monkey! Aren't you ashamed!" Mr. Murphy departed, sobbing, cradling the tiny primate in his hands.

The next evening, Caesar began convulsing and died. Mr. Murphy had secretly placed poison-laced hamburger meat on the porch. An Irish Catholic, Murphy erected a memorial featuring a figure of Saint Francis to the dead monkey and sang a Dies Irae over it. Many of the locals sanctioned his killing of the dog as a form of euthanasia. Murphy withdrew further into his solitary alcoholism, and the girls ceased to visit him. The story returns to the present and the zoo.

The narrator takes leave of her sister Daisy and boards a home-bound train. En route she reflects that both she and her sister have internalized some of adamant misanthropy of the woman who raised them.

== Critical appraisal ==
"To paraphrase a comment once made by James Branch Cabell, Jean Stafford seems to have dedicated herself to writing beautifully about unbeautiful matters." — Literary critic, William Peden. New York Times. (May 10, 1953).

Author Joyce Carol Oates singles out the story for special mention: "Among Stafford's many strengths as a writer of fiction are a sharp poetic eye for the telling detail — the doomed capuchin monkey Shannon of "In the Zoo" — and an authorial voice that ranges from the sinewy and vernacular to the coolly detached.

Oates offers the following passage as evidence of Stafford's nuanced literary gifts:

The dog was tangibly in the room with us, shedding his fur, biting his fleas, shaking rain off himself to splatter the walls, dragging some dreadful carcass across the floor, chewing up slippers, knocking over chairs with his tail, gobbling the chops from the platter, barking, biting, fathering, fighting, smelling to high heaven of carrion, staining the rug with his muddy feet, scratching the floor with his claws. He developed rabies; he bit a child, two children! And Gran and her poor darlings went to jail for harboring this murderous, odoriferous, drunk, Roman Catholic dog.

— Jean Stafford, "In the Zoo", Collected Stories (1984)

== Theme ==
The title for the work is derived from the framing of the story, which begins and ends in a city zoo. Here, the narrator and her sister reveal the extent to which their "nightmarish childhood" has instilled a misanthropic outlook that persists into their adulthood.

Critic Mary Gordon, writing in Literary Hub cautions readers that "In the Zoo", with its collection of lovely pets in Mr. Murphy's menagerie, is nonetheless a distressing tale. The narrator and her sister Daisy have not escaped the pernicious examples set by their guardian, Gran: "What is perhaps the most terrible aspect of the story is that Daisy and her sister have, despite their best efforts, absorbed some of Gran's suspiciousness and ill wishing."

Joyce Carol Oates ranks the story among the "serious stories" in Stafford's collected works. She writes of it:

[A] woman who saw fraud and evil everywhere and who revealed her own soul when she refashioned the young girls' dog into a vicious creature that terrorized the neighborhood. The story moves skilfully between the satirical and the brutal, and only at the end, when the sisters half-mockingly reveal their legacy of suspicion and hatred, is the power of evil made real for us.
