= Jerome Mazzaro =

American editor and poet (born 1934)

- Born: November 25, 1934 (age 90); Detroit, Michigan, U.S.
- Occupation: Editor; poet
- Education: Wayne State University (AB, PhD); University of Iowa (MA)

Jerome Mazzaro (born November 25, 1934) was an American editor and poet.

Mazzaro graduated from Wayne State University with a A.B. in 1954, and with a Ph.D. in 1963, and from the University of Iowa with a M.A. in 1956.

He worked as a technical writer for General Motors from 1955 to 1956. He taught at the University of Detroit from 1958 to 1961, and at the State University of New York at Cortland from 1962 to 1964, and at the University at Buffalo, The State University of New York.

Mazzaro edited Fresco from 1960 to 1961, and Modern Poetry Studies from 1970 to 1979. He was assistant editor for North American Review from 1963 to 1965, and Noetics from 1964 to 1965. He contributed to Salmagundi, American Poetry Review, and Helios.

== Awards ==
- 1964 Guggenheim Fellowship

== Works ==
- The Achievement of Robert Lowell: 1939-1959 (1960)
- The Poetic Themes of Robert Lowell University of Michigan Press, 1965
- Transformations in the Renaissance English lyric, Cornell University Press, 1970, ISBN 978-0-8014-0587-7
- Modern American poetry: essays in criticism, Editor Jerome Mazzaro, D. McKay Co., 1970
- William Carlos Williams: The Later Poetry Cornell University Press, 1973
- Postmodern American poetry, University of Illinois Press, 1980, ISBN 978-0-252-00759-0
- The Figure of Dante (1981)

=== Translations ===
- Satires, Authors Juvenal, Editor Richard Emil Braun, Translated Jerome Mazzaro, University of Michigan Press, 1965

=== Poetry ===
- Changing the Windows University Press, 1966

=== Anthologies ===
- "Lullaby; Early Afternoon, Chautaugua", From the margin: writings in Italian Americana, Editors Anthony Julian Tamburri, Paolo Giordano, Fred L. Gardaphé, Purdue University Press, 2000, ISBN 9781557531520
- "The Caves of Love", Wild Dreams: The Best of Italian Americana, Editors Carol Bonomo Albright, Joanna Clapps Herman, Fordham Univ Press, 2008, ISBN 978-0-8232-2910-9
- "Yvonne Winters and In Defense of Reason", The Critics who made us: essays from Sewanee review, Editor George Core, University of Missouri Press, 1993, ISBN 978-0-8262-0916-0
