= A. J. Liebling =

American journalist (1904–1963)

- Born: Abbott Joseph Liebling; October 18, 1904; New York City, U.S.
- Died: December 28, 1963 (aged 59); New York City, U.S.
- Occupation: Journalist
- Spouses: Ann Beatrice McGinn (m. 1934; div. 1949) Lucille Spectorsky (m. 1949; div. 1959) Jean Stafford (m. 1959)

Abbott Joseph Liebling (October 18, 1904 – December 28, 1963) was an American journalist who was closely associated with The New Yorker from 1935 until his death. His New York Times obituary called him "a critic of the daily press, a chronicler of the prize ring, an epicure and a biographer of such diverse personages as Gov. Earl Long of Louisiana and Col. John R. Stingo." He was known for dubbing Chicago "The Second City" and for the aphorism "Freedom of the press is guaranteed only to those who own one." Liebling's boxing book The Sweet Science was named the greatest sports book of all time by Sports Illustrated. Liebling was a connoisseur of French cuisine, a subject he wrote about in Between Meals: An Appetite For Paris. Pete Hamill, editor of a Library of America anthology of Liebling's writings, said "He was a gourmand of words, in addition to food... he retained his taste for 'low' culture too: boxers and corner men, conmen and cigar store owners, political hacks and hack operators. They're all celebrated in [his] pages."

== Early life ==
Liebling was born into a well-off family on the Upper East Side of Manhattan, where his father worked in New York's fur industry. His father was a Jewish immigrant from Austria and his mother, Anna Adelson Slone, came from a Jewish family in San Francisco. After early schooling in New York, Liebling was admitted to Dartmouth College in the fall of 1920. His primary activity during his undergraduate career was as a contributor to the Jack-O-Lantern, Dartmouth's nationally known humor magazine. He left Dartmouth without graduating, later claiming he was "thrown out for missing compulsory chapel attendance." He then enrolled in the School of Journalism at Columbia University.

== Career ==
=== Early years ===
After finishing at Columbia, he began his career as a journalist at the Evening Bulletin of Providence, Rhode Island. He worked briefly in the sports department of The New York Times, from which he supposedly was fired for listing the name "Ignoto" (Italian for "unknown") as the referee in results of games.

In 1926, Liebling's father asked if he would like to suspend his career as a journalist to study in Paris for a year.

I sensed my father's generous intention and, fearing that he might change his mind, I told him that I didn't feel I should go, since I was indeed thinking of getting married. "The girl is ten years older than I am," I said, "and Mother might think she is kind of fast, because she is being kept by a cotton broker from Memphis, Tennessee, who only comes North once in a while. But you are a man of the world, and you understand that a woman can't always help herself..." Within the week, I had a letter of credit on the Irving Trust for two thousand dollars, and a reservation on the old Caronia for late in the summer, when the off-season rates would be in effect.

Liebling later wrote that the unsuitable proposed marriage was a fiction intended less to swindle his father than to cover his own pride at being the recipient of such generosity.

Thus in summer 1926, Liebling sailed to Europe where he studied French medieval literature at the Sorbonne in Paris. By his own admission his devotion to his studies was purely nominal, as he saw the year as a chance to absorb French life and appreciate French food. Although he stayed for little more than a year, this interval inspired a lifelong love for France and the French, later renewed in his war reporting. He returned to Providence in autumn 1927 to write for the Journal. He then moved to New York, where he proceeded to campaign for a job on Joseph Pulitzer's New York World, which carried the work of James M. Cain and Walter Lippmann and was known at the time as "the writer's paper". In order to attract the attention of the city editor, James W. Barrett, Liebling hired an out-of-work Norwegian seaman to walk for three days outside the Pulitzer Building, on Park Row, wearing sandwich boards that read Hire Joe Liebling. It turned out that Barrett habitually used a different entrance on another street, and never saw the sign. He wrote for the World (1930–31) and the World-Telegram (1931–35).

=== The New Yorker ===
Liebling joined The New Yorker in 1935. His best pieces from the late thirties are collected in Back Where I Came From (1938) and The Telephone Booth Indian (1942).

During World War II, Liebling was active as a war correspondent, filing many stories from Africa, England, and France. His war began when he flew to Europe in October 1939 to cover its early battles, lived in Paris until June 10, 1940, and then returned to the United States until July 1941, when he flew to Britain. He sailed to Algeria in November 1942 to cover the fighting on the Tunisian front (January to May 1943). His articles from these days are collected in The Road Back to Paris (1944). He participated in the Normandy landings on D-Day, and he wrote a memorable piece concerning his experiences under fire aboard a U.S. Coast Guard-staffed landing craft off Omaha Beach. He afterwards spent two months in Normandy and Brittany, and was with the Allied forces when they entered Paris. He wrote afterwards: "For the first time in my life and probably the last, I have lived for a week in a great city where everybody was happy." Liebling was awarded the Cross of the Legion of Honour by the French government for his war reporting.

Following the war he returned to regular magazine fare and for many years after he wrote a New Yorker monthly feature called "Wayward Press", in which he analyzed the American press. Liebling was also a fan of boxing, horse racing and food, and frequently wrote about these subjects.

In 1947 he published The Wayward Pressman, a collection of his writings from The New Yorker and other publications.

=== Hiss case ===
During the late 1940s, he vigorously criticized the House Un-American Activities Committee and became friends with Alger Hiss.

In 1949, he published Of Mink and Red Herring, a "second book of critical articles on New York newspapers", which included his critique of the "scurrilous journalism" applied to victims of "Elizabeth Bentley and her ilk". On July 23, 1949, The New Yorker published an article by Liebling entitled "Spotlight on the Jury" in which he opened by stating "The trial of Alger Hiss, which produced some of the best and some of the worst newspaper copy of our time" and concluded "This sort of thing obviously and apparently lessens the chance of a fair trial next time. Perhaps the secrecy of the jury room, like that of the voting booth, should be protected by law."

=== Last years ===
In 1961, Liebling published The Earl of Louisiana, originally published as a series of articles in The New Yorker in which he covered the trials and tribulations of the governor of Louisiana, Earl K. Long, the younger brother of the Louisiana politician Huey Long.

== Personal life ==
He married Ann Beatrice McGinn, a former movie theater ticket taker he had met while she was working in Providence, Rhode Island, on July 28, 1934. McGinn suffered from either bipolar disorder or schizophrenia, which caused her to have hallucinations and go into fugue states. Her illness required many lengthy and expensive hospital stays and when she was out of the hospital, she was often heavily sedated. Both Liebling and McGinn committed infidelities during their marriage.

In 1946 he and his wife separated. They divorced on August 30, 1949, in Reno, Nevada. Two days later he married Lucille Spectorsky, the ex-wife of Auguste Comte Spectorsky, in Virginia City, Nevada. Spectorsky was described by Liebling's friend and New Yorker editor Gardner Botsford as "a big blonde from rural Kentucky, amiable if dumb." Liebling and Spectorsky divorced in 1959 and he married author Jean Stafford the same year.

On December 19, 1963, Liebling was hospitalized for bronchopneumonia. He died on December 28 at Mount Sinai Hospital, and was buried in the Green River Cemetery, East Hampton, New York.

== Legacy ==
- Liebling's papers are archived at Cornell University.
- In 1995, the Boxing Writers Association of America created the A.J. Liebling Award. The first class of honorees included longtime Washington, D.C. sportswriters Sam Lacy and Shirley Povich.
- In 2008, the Library of America published a volume of Liebling's World War II writings. The book includes the essays The Road Back to Paris, Mollie and Other War Pieces, Normandy Revisited, as well as his uncollected war journalism. In 2009, this was followed by the publication of The Sweet Science and Other Writings, edited by Pete Hamill.
- The journalist and sportswriter W. C. Heinz called Liebling "the best essayist."
- The Library of America selected Liebling's 1955 New Yorker story "The Case of the Scattered Dutchman" for inclusion in its two-century retrospective of American True Crime writing, published in 2008.
- Friend and fellow New Yorker writer Joseph Mitchell inherited Liebling's book library after his death, and recalls Liebling's once having used bacon as a bookmark.
- A later New Yorker writer, Anthony Lane, wrote favorably of Liebling, whose "delicately gluttonous writings on food keep wandering off (when he can tear himself away) into such equally pressing areas Paris, boxing and sex."
- Anthony Bourdain named Between Meals as one of his favorite books, adding "He was an enthusiastic lover of food and wine, very knowledgeable but never a snob. It's the benchmark for great food writing."

His writing was often memorable, as was his eating, and he nicely combined the two passions in Between Meals (1962), of which the following extract gives a taste:

In the restaurant on the Rue Saint-Augustin, Parisian actor and gourmand Yves Mirande would dazzle his juniors, French and American, by dispatching a lunch of raw Bayonne ham and fresh figs, a hot sausage in crust, spindles of filleted pike in a rich rose sauce Nantua, a leg of lamb larded with anchovies, artichokes on a pedestal of foie gras, and four or five kinds of cheese, with a good bottle of Bordeaux and one of champagne, after which he would call for the Armagnac and remind Madame to have ready for dinner the larks and ortolans she had promised him, with a few langoustes and a turbot — and, of course, a fine civet made from the marcassin, or young wild boar, that the lover of the leading lady in his current production had sent up from his estate in the Sologne. "And while I think of it," I once heard him say, "we haven't had any woodcock for days, or truffles baked in the ashes, and the cellar is becoming a disgrace — no more '34s and hardly any '37s. Last week, I had to offer my publisher a bottle that was far too good for him, simply because there was nothing between the insulting and the superlative."

== Bibliography ==
=== Books ===
- Marks, Edward B. (1934). They all sang : from Tony Pastor to Rudy Vallée. As told to Abbott J. Liebling. New York: Viking Press. (Note: Memoir by the music publisher Edward B. Marks.)
- Back Where I Came From (1938) (Note: Back Where I Came From; 1938 (1990 North Point Press ed: ISBN 0-86547-425-7)) Collection of pieces about New York
- The Telephone Booth Indian (1942) (Note: The Telephone Booth Indian; 1942, Doubleday, Doran and Co.:Garden City, New York (2004 Broadway Books ed: ISBN 0-7679-1736-7)) Collection of New Yorker pieces
- The Road Back to Paris (1944) (Note: The Road Back to Paris; 1944 Doubleday, Doran and Co.:Garden City, New York (1997 Modern Library ed: ISBN 0-679-60248-8)) Reporting on World War II, 1939–43
- La République du silence (1945) / Republic of Silence (1947), editor, with Eugene Jay Sheffer. Collection of articles from the French underground press.
- The Wayward Pressman (1947) (Note: The Wayward Pressman; 1947, Doubleday:Garden City, New York (1972 Greenwood Press ed: ISBN 0-8371-6173-8)) First collection of press criticism
- Mink and Red Herring (1949) (Note: Mink and Red Herring: The Wayward Pressman's Casebook;1949, Doubleday:Garden City, New York (1972 Greenwood Press ed: ISBN 0-8371-6174-6)) Second collection of press criticism
- Chicago: The Second City (1952) (Note: Chicago: The Second City; 1952, Knopf: New York (2004 Univ of Nebraska Press ed: ISBN 0-8032-8035-1)) Portrait of Chicago
- The Honest Rainmaker (1953) (Note: The Honest Rainmaker: The Life and Times of Colonel John R. Stingo; 1953, Doubleday:Garden City, New York) On the New York racing columnist Colonel John R. Stingo
- The Sweet Science (1956) (Note: The Sweet Science; 1956, Viking Press: New York (1982 Penguin Books ed: ISBN 0-14-006191-6)) Collection of boxing pieces
- Normandy Revisited (1958) (Note: Normandy Revisited; 1958, Simon & Schuster: New York) Recollections of events in 1944 and revisiting in the 1950s
- The Press (1961, revised 1964) (Note: The Press - Ballantine Books:New York, 1961 (1975 Ballantine ed: ISBN 0-345-24396-X)) Third collection of press criticism, including some pieces from The Wayward Pressman and Mink and Red Herring
- The Earl of Louisiana (1961) (Note: The Earl of Louisiana, Louisiana State University Press:Baton Rouge, 1961 (ISBN 0-8071-0537-6)) On Earl Long and Louisiana politics
- The Jollity Building (1962) Collection reprinting material from The Telephone Booth Indian and The Honest Rainmaker
- Between Meals (1962) (Note: Between Meals: An Appetite for Paris - 1962 (1995 ed: ISBN 0-679-60142-2)) Memoir of living and eating in France
- Mollie & Other War Pieces (1964) (Note: Mollie and Other War Pieces - 1964 (2004 ed: ISBN 0-8032-8031-9)) Reporting on World War II, 1943–44

Later collections

- Liebling Abroad (1981) (Note: Liebling Abroad: The Road Back to Paris / Mollie and Other War Pieces / Normandy Revisited / Between Meals: An Appetite for Paris; 1981, Wideview Books: New York) Collects The Road Back to Paris, Mollie, Normandy Revisited, Between Meals
- Liebling At Home (1982) Collects The Telephone Booth Indian, Chicago, The Honest Rainmaker, The Earl of Louisiana, The Jollity Building
- A Neutral Corner (1990) Collection of post-The Sweet Science boxing pieces
- Liebling at the New Yorker (1994) Uncollected New Yorker pieces
- A Reporter At Large: Dateline – Pyramid Lake, Nevada (1999) (Note: A Reporter At Large Dateline: Pyramid Lake, Nevada originally published in The New Yorker, 1955, entitled "The Lake of the Cui-Ui Eaters", University of Nevada Press. 1999.) Report on the Pyramid Lake Paiute Tribe Reservation, from 1955
- Just Enough Liebling (2004) (Note: Just Enough Liebling: Classic Work by the Legendary New Yorker Writer 2004 (ISBN 0-374-10443-3) - A posthumous collection of his writings) Selections from Liebling's whole career
- World War II Writings (2009) (Note: World War II Writings: The Road Back to Paris /Mollie and Other War Pieces / Uncollected War Journalism / Normandy Revisited, Pete Hamill, ed. (New York: Library of America, 2008) ISBN 978-1-59853-018-6) Collects The Road Back to Paris, Mollie, uncollected war journalism, Normandy Revisited
- The Sweet Science and Other Writings (2009) (Note: The Sweet Science and Other Writings: The Earl of Louisiana / The Jollity Building / Between Meals / The Press, Pete Hamill, ed. (New York: Library of America, 2009) ISBN 978-1-59853-040-7) Collects The Sweet Science, The Earl of Louisiana, The Jollity Building, Between Meals, The Press
- Liebling's War (2011) (Note: Liebling's War: the World War II Dispatches of A.J. Liebling; University of New Mexico Press, 2011 ed: ISBN 0-8263-4905-6) Reporting on World War II, including pieces from The Road Back to Paris, Mollie, Normandy Revisited

=== Essays and reporting ===
- Liebling, A. J. (January 7, 1950). "Aspirins for atoms, down with babushkas!". The Wayward Press. The New Yorker. 25 (46): 52, 53–59. (Note: On the Chicago Tribune.)
- — (January 21, 1950). "'Dismally' was the word". The Wayward Press. The New Yorker. 25 (48): 76–84. (Note: On New York City daily newspapers.)
- — (August 29, 2022). "Lugubrious mama". The Talk of the Town. November 15, 1947. The New Yorker. 98 (26): 12. (Note: Originally published in the November 15, 1947, issue.) (Note: Online version is titled "Edith Piaf's thousand (delightful) ways to bum you out".)

———————
