= The Interior Castle (short story) =

- Short story by Jean Stafford
- Country: United States
- Language: English

Publication
- Published in: Partisan Review
- Publication type: Literary journal
- Media type: Print (magazine)
- Publication date: November–December 1946

"The Interior Castle" is a short story by Jean Stafford originally appearing in Partisan Review (November–December 1946) and first collected in Children Are Bored on Sunday (1953) published by Farrar, Straus & Giroux.

Editors John Updike and Katrina Kenison selected "The Interior Castle" for The Best American Short Stories of the Century (1999).

== Plot ==
"The Interior Castle" is written from a third-person omniscient point-of-view. Pansy Vanneman and Dr. Nicholas are the focal characters. The events take place in a hospital.

Pansy is recovering from injuries she suffered when the taxi she was riding in crashed; the cab driver was killed. She suffered major trauma to her cranium—the bone and cartilage around sinuses were shattered. Pansy's "crushed and splintered nose" requires extensive reconstructive surgery. At night she lies awake, listening to the horrifying sounds of the other patients in the ward; some scream as their morphine wears off, others writhe in their death agonies. This contrasts with the hospital staff who go about their tasks with cheerful self-complacence. Weeks pass as Pansy's head fracture heals sufficiently for her to undergo the delicate task of reconstructing her nose. She evinces a studied remoteness towards the nurses and aides who attend to her, causing resentment among the staff. Pansy secretly takes pleasure in their discomfiture; they consider her a snob.

Pansy begins to obsess over the upcoming operation, one which will necessitate inserting scalpels and other sharp implements very close to her brain. She conceives of this precious organ as a jewel, a delicate flower, a light, "always pink and always fragile, always deeply interior and invaluable." The youthful Dr. Nicholas is eager to begin the surgery. Tall, handsome, and widely regarded as supremely talented, he is adored by his internees.

The preparation for the surgery alone is agonizing—only local anesthetics are applied. Dr. Nicholas keeps up a jocular banter with Pansy as a way to reassure her. Then he descends upon her with probes, pincers, knives, scissors, applying them near her brain tissue as he chips away at bone and tendons. The pain is excruciating and Pansy begins to hallucinate. The nurses gasp at the surgeon's virtuoso performance. Pansy withdraws into a state of terror and loathing that transitions into ecstasy.

The medical ordeal ends successfully. The doctor congratulates his patient and he and his staff depart triumphantly from the operating room. As Pansy's awareness slowly emerges she realizes that a precious and private realm has been violated by Dr. Nicholas: "Her silent mind abused him: 'you are a thief' it said, 'you are heartless and you should be put to death.'"

== Background ==
In 1938 Stafford suffered serious spinal and facial injuries in an automobile accident with poet and later husband Robert Lowell who was driving the vehicle. "The Interior Castle" is Stafford's only effort to fictionalize the incident and the reconstructive surgery which followed "that permanently scarred her face."

== Theme ==
Literary critic Mary Gordon at Literary Hub notes that some passages in the story provide a clinically "precise description of pain." The story transcends a merely clinic interpretation:

[I]t is misleading to say that this is only a story about a surgery; It touches on the most profound of subjects: what is the self, what is identity, what is the mind, and what is its connection to the physical brain?"

Author Joyce Carol Oates and literary critic Ihab Hassan each offer the following passage from "The Interior Castle" as evidence of Stafford's literary achievement.

The knives ground and carved and curried and scoured the wounds they made; the scissors clipped hard gristle and the scalpels chipped off bone... the pain was a pyramid made of a diamond; it was an intense light; it was the hottest fire, the coldest chill, the highest peak, the fastest force, the furthest reach, the newest time. It possessed nothing of her but its one infinitesimal scene; beyond the screen as thin as gossamer, the brain trembled for its life..."

=== St. Teresa of Avila and Los Morados (1577) ===
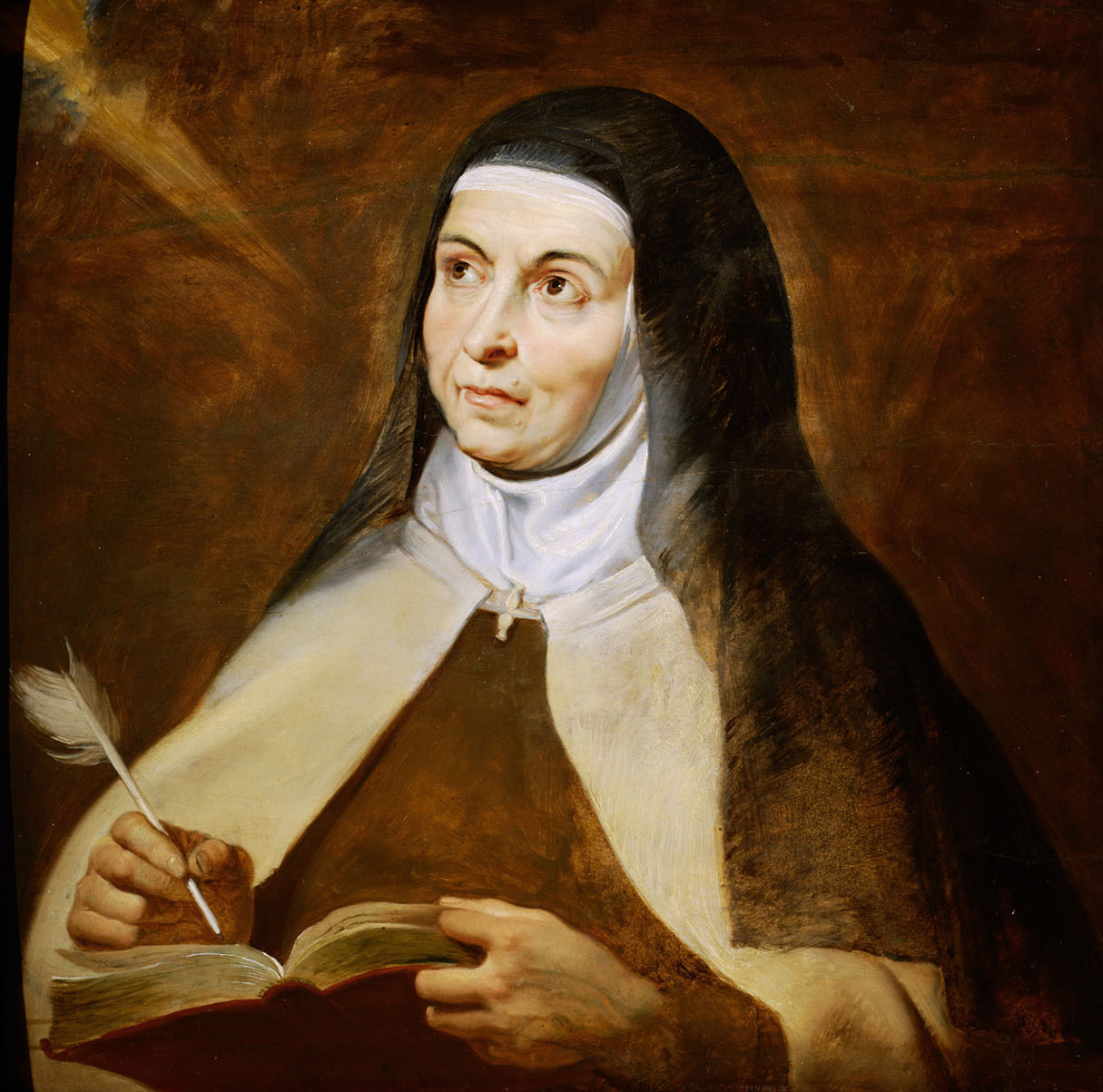
St. Teresa of Ávila

Stafford appropriated both the title of the story from thematic elements of a sixteenth century mystic saint Teresa of Ávila.

Her Los Morados (The Dwelling Place) conceives the soul as a multi-chambered "interior castle."

... a most beautiful crystal globe, made in the shape of a castle, and containing seven mansions, in the seventh and innermost of which was the King of Glory, in the greatest splendour, illumining and beautifying them all. The nearer one got to the centre, the stronger was the light; outside the palace limits everything was foul, dark and infested with toads, vipers and other venomous creatures."

Literary critic Mary Ann Wilson reports that "Teresa's contemplative piece provided Stafford a vehicle by which to convey the inexpressible—the excruciating, but transcendent physical and psychic pain" that Pansy experienced during the surgery and its aftermath.

== Sources ==
- Gordon, Mary. "Amusing, Disturbing, Delightful: Celebrating Jean Stafford". Literary Hub, November 30, 2022. Accessed February 10, 2026.
- Hassan, Ihab. "Jean Stafford: The Expense of Style and the Scope of Sensibility". Western Review 19, Spring 1955 pp. 185-203 in Jean Stafford: A Study of the Short Fiction. 1996. Twayne Publishers, New York. pp. 109-114. ISBN 0-8057-7807-1
- Oates, Joyce Carol. "The Interior Castle: The Art of Jean Stafford's Short Fiction". Shenandoah 30, Autumn 1979. pp. 61-64 in Jean Stafford: A Study of the Short Fiction. 1996. Twayne Publishers, New York. pp. 136-139. ISBN 0-8057-7807-1
- Peden, William. "A Bleak, Sad World; CHILDREN ARE BORED ON SUNDAY." The New York Times, May 10, 1953. https://www.nytimes.com/1953/05/10/archives/a-bleak-sad-world-children-are-bored-on-sunday-by-jean-stafford-252.html Accessed February 12, 2026.
- Stafford, Jean. 1984. The Collected Stories of Jean Stafford. E. P. Dutton, New York. ISBN 0-525-48101-X
- Updike, John and Kenison, Katrina. 1999. The Best American Short Stories of the Century. Houghton-Mifflin Company, New York. ISBN 978-0395843673
- Wilson, Mary Ann. 1996. Jean Stafford: A Study of the Short Fiction. Twayne Publishers. Simon & Schuster, New York. ISBN 0-8057-7807-1
