= Scott Bradfield =

American novelist (born 1955)

- Born: Scott Michael Bradfield; April 27, 1955 (age 71)
- Occupations: Essayist; critic; writer

Scott Michael Bradfield (born April 27, 1955) is an American essayist, critic and fiction writer who resides in London, England. He has taught at the University of California, the University of Connecticut and Kingston University and has reviewed for The Times Literary Supplement, Elle, The Observer, Vice and The Independent. He is best known, however, for his short stories, of which he has had four collections published. The 1998 film Luminous Motion, for which he wrote the screenplay, was based on his first novel, The History of Luminous Motion (1989). Bradfield also operates a public YouTube channel, where he uploads videos on a variety of books and literary topics.

== Bibliography ==
=== Novels ===
- The History of Luminous Motion. New York: Knopf. 1989.
- What's Wrong with America. New York: St. Martin's. 1994.
- Animal Planet New York: Picador USA, 1995. ISBN 978-0-312-13428-0
- Good Girl Wants It Bad New York: Carroll & Graf, 2004. ISBN 978-0-7867-1338-7
- The People Who Watched Her Pass By Columbus, Ohio: Two Dollar Radio, 2010. ISBN 978-0-9820151-5-5
- The history of luminous motion. Reprint. New York: Calamari Press. 2013 [1989].
- Dazzle Resplendent: Adventures of a Misanthropic Dog: 2016, ISBN 978-1533290960

=== Short fiction ===
Collections

- The Secret Life of Houses London: Unwin Hyman, 1989. ISBN 978-0-04-440241-1
- Dream of the Wolf New York: Knopf, 1990. ISBN 978-0-394-58213-9
- Greetings from Earth: New and Collected Stories New York: Picador USA, 1996. ISBN 978-0-312-14088-5
- Hot Animal Love: Tales of Modern Romance New York: Carroll & Graf, 2005. ISBN 978-0-7867-1576-3

Stories

Title	Year	First published	Reprinted/collected	Notes
Dazzle joins the Screenwriter's Guild	2008	"Dazzle joins the Screenwriter's Guild". F&SF. 115 (4&5): 108–125. October–November 2008.		
The Devil disinvests	2000	"The Devil disinvests". F&SF. 99 (4&5): 32–36. Oct–Nov 2000.		

=== Criticism ===
- Dreaming Revolution: Transgression in the Development of American Romance. Iowa City: University Of Iowa Press, 1993. ISBN 978-0-87745-395-6
- Why I Hate Toni Morrison's Beloved: First presented as the Seymour Fischer Lecture at the Free University of Berlin, on January 17, 2001. It was revised and expanded and published in the Denver Quarterly and later reprinted online . Published by Createspace Independent Publishing Platform (2016): ISBN 1530581761 ISBN 9781530581764
