= Orville Prescott =

American book reviewer (1906–1996)

- Born: September 8, 1906; Cleveland, Ohio, U.S.
- Died: April 28, 1996 (aged 89); New Canaan, Connecticut, U.S.
- Education: Williams College
- Occupation: Literary critic
- Known for: Main book reviewer for The New York Times

Orville Prescott (September 8, 1906 – April 28, 1996) was the main book reviewer for The New York Times for 24 years.

== Biography ==
Born on September 8, 1906, in Cleveland, Ohio, Prescott graduated from Williams College in 1930. He began his career as a researcher for Newsweek, then known as News-Week, and became the literary editor of Cue Magazine before joining the Times, where he wrote three or four book reviews every week from 1942 through 1966. More than any other reviewer, he influenced sales of books across the country, and was held in high esteem. His reviews showed a preference for traditional novels with strong narratives and clear characterizations.

In 1958, he reviewed Lolita by Vladimir Nabokov and described it as "dull, dull, dull in a pretentious, florid and archly fatuous fashion". In 1961, Gore Vidal wrote a scathing portrait of Prescott as a reviewer. Vidal later wrote that Prescott was so offended by his depiction of a homosexual love affair in The City and the Pillar that he refused to review his work or allow the Times to review it.

Prescott edited three anthologies about history and after his retirement wrote two books on the Italian Renaissance. He died aged 89 on April 28, 1996, at his home in New Canaan, Connecticut.

== Works ==
- In My Opinion: An Inquiry into the Contemporary Novel (1952)
- The Five Dollar Gold Piece: The Development of a Point of View (1956)
- Robin Hood: The Outlaw of Sherwood Forest, illustrated by Charles Beck (1959) – children's picture book, LCCN 59-6144
- Undying Past (1961)
- A Father Reads to His Children: An Anthology of Prose and Poetry (1965)
- Princes of the Renaissance: A Chronicle of the Private Lives and Public Careers of the Kings, Dukes, Popes and Despots Who Ruled Italy in the Fifteenth Century (1969)
- History as Literature (1971)
- Lords of Italy: Portraits from the Middle Ages (1972)
- Mid-Century: An Anthology of Distinguished Contemporary American Short Stories (1973)
