= Shenandoah (magazine) =

- Discipline: literary magazine
- Language: English
- Edited by: Beth Staples

Publication details
- History: 1950 to present
- Publisher: Washington and Lee University (United States)
- Frequency: Biannual

Standard abbreviations
- ISO 4: Shenandoah

Indexing
- ISSN: 0037-3583

Links
- Journal homepage

Shenandoah: The Washington and Lee Review is a literary magazine published by Washington and Lee University.

== History ==
Originally a student-run quarterly, Shenandoah has evolved into a biannual literary journal. Since 2018, the magazine has been edited by current English professor Beth Staples. According to Shenandoah's mission statement, the magazine aims to showcase diverse voices because "reading through the perspective of another person, persona, or character is one of the ways we practice empathy, expand our understanding of the world, and experience new levels of awareness."

Shenandoah was founded in 1949 by a group of Washington and Lee University faculty members, including English professor Samuel Ashley Brown, who published the fiction and poetry of undergraduates including Tom Wolfe. In the 1950s Thomas H. Carter became one of the founding student editors. During his tenure the Shenandoah corresponded with E. E. Cummings, William Carlos Williams, William Faulkner, Ezra Pound and many other Southern writers and the Shenandoah grew in stature and national prominence. From the 1960s to the 1980s, W&L faculty member James Boatwright expanded the journal and published occasional theme issues, including a 35th anniversary anthology. In 1995, R. T. Smith was selected as the first full-time editor of the journal. In 2018 after twenty-three years as editor, R. T. Smith retired, and Beth Staples took over as editor of the magazine. Today, the magazine publishes biannually in the spring and fall.

Shenandoah is funded and supported by Washington and Lee University through the Office of the Dean of the College and is located in Mattingly House on W&L's campus. The magazine maintains a board of university advisors who offer guidance and advice, and the current editor maintains an intern program in which undergraduate students work for the journal and learn the craft of editing as an academic course in the English Department.

Recent contributors include Wendell Berry, Joyce Carol Oates, Jacob M. Appel, Speer Morgan, Lee Smith, Claudia Emerson, May-lee Chai, and Rita Dove. This list complements a long history of literary luminaries who have been published in Shenandoah such as W. H. Auden, James Merrill, J. R. R. Tolkien, T. S. Eliot, Ray Bradbury, and Flannery O'Connor.

Since moving away from print in 2011, the magazine can now be found online in its entirety.

== Fellowships and contest ==
In the past, Shenandoah has hosted several prestigious annual contests: the James Boatwright III Prize for Poetry, the Goodheart Prize for Fiction, the Thomas H. Carter Prize for the Essay, and the Shenandoah/Glasgow Prize for Emerging Writers. Presently, Shenandoah host the Graybeal-Gowan Prize for Virginia Writers. In 2021, Shenandoah launched a fellowship for BIPOC editors. Through a competitive application process, the magazine selects one fellow for each issue to aid in the selection of fiction, non-fiction, poems, or comics.

== Recent honors, awards and reviews ==
- 2008 Governor's Award for the Arts
- "The Worst You Ever Feel" by Rebecca Makkai was included in The Best American Short Stories 2008.
- "Souvenir" by Beth Ann Fennelly was included in The Best American Poetry 2006
- "Death Is Intended" by Linda Pastan was included in The Best American Poetry 2005
- "A Portrait of the Artist as a Young Stalker" by Kate Osana Simonian was "noted" in The Best American Essays 2019
- "Volume 68 Number 1: Bodies, Bones, and the Space We Occupy" was given "5 Stars" on "The Review Review"

== See also ==
- List of literary magazines
