= A. J. Bermudez =

American screenwriter and fiction writer

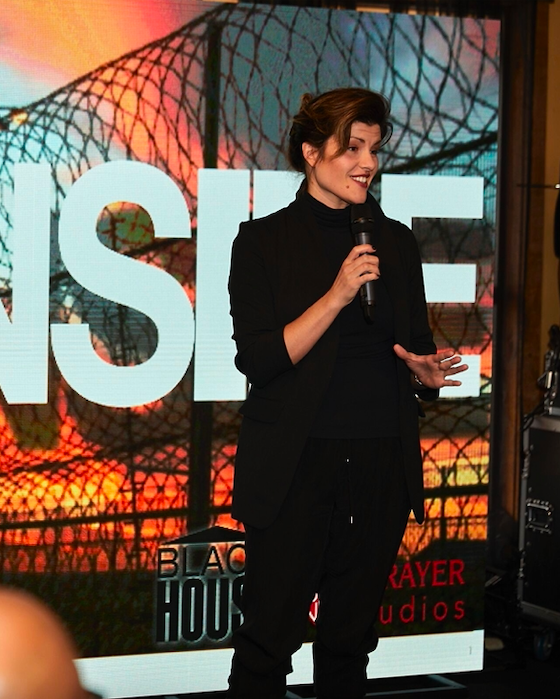
- Born: Amanda J. Bermudez
- Occupation: Writer
- Writing career
- Genres: Screenwriting, fiction, short fiction
- Notable works: My Dead Friend Zoe, iCON, Nightingale, Stories No One Hopes Are About Them
- Notable awards: PAGE International Screenwriting Award, Alpine Fellowship Writing Prize, Iowa Short Fiction Award
- Website: amandajbermudez.com

A. J. Bermudez is an American author, screenwriter, and director. Her short fiction and screenwriting have won a number of awards, including the PAGE International Screenwriting Award (iCON, 2021), the Alpine Fellowship Writing Prize ("The Lady Will Pay for Everything", 2021), and the Iowa Short Fiction Award (Stories No One Hopes Are About Them, University of Iowa Press, 2022). Her films have been produced in the U.S. and internationally, and her literary writing has appeared in McSweeney's, Virginia Quarterly Review, Story, Chicago Review, The Masters Review, Fiction International, Electric Literature, Boulevard, Creative Nonfiction, and elsewhere.

== Personal life ==
Bermudez grew up in various parts of the United States, and after graduating high school at age 16, she moved to Russia, where she worked as a music translator and with the Afghan refugee population in Moscow. Prior to screenwriting, Bermudez worked as an EMT.

In interviews, Bermudez has talked about the loss of her parents at a young age, and has described "writing, like mourning, [as] a constant negotiation between the political and the personal."

== Career ==
Bermudez has been a vocal advocate of social justice and the arts. In 2019, she was named one of the Top 25 Screenwriters to Watch by the International Screenwriters Association. Her debut book was called a "must-read" by Publishers Weekly and was described by Anthony Marra as "an absolutely brilliant collection, so of the moment formally and politically yet timeless in its pursuit of human contradiction."

Bermudez was announced as Co-Editor of The Maine Review in January 2022, and currently serves as Editor. As a writer, Bermudez's work has been noted to focus on "intersections of power, privilege, and place," with characters who subvert traditional ideas of literary protagonists.

In 2022, Bermudez was one of the inaugural resident artists of the Nawat Fes Residency in Fez, Morocco.

Bermudez co-wrote the film My Dead Friend Zoe, which premiered at South by Southwest in 2024, with director Kyle Hausmann-Stokes.

== Awards and honors ==
Year	Work	Accolade	Result	Ref
2024	My Dead Friend Zoe	South by Southwest Narrative Spotlight Award	Winner	
2023	Stories No One Hopes Are About Them	Lambda Literary Award	Finalist	
2023	"The Real India"	Pushcart Prize	Winner	
2023	Self	Steinbeck Fellowship	Winner	
2023	"Picking the Wound"	Best Small Fictions	Nominee	
2022	Stories No One Hopes Are About Them	Iowa Short Fiction Award	Winner	
2022	Stories No One Hopes Are About Them	The Story Prize	Nominee	
2021	iCON	PAGE International Screenwriting Award	Winner	
2021	"The Lady Will Pay for Everything"	Alpine Fellowship Writing Prize	Winner	
2021	"Obscure Trivia of the Antarctic"	Pushcart Prize	Nominee	
2021	"Octopus"	Adina Talve-Goodman Fellowship	Finalist	
2020	Self	SmokeLong Fellowship for Emerging Writers	Finalist	
2019	Self	Top 25 Screenwriters to Watch	Selection	
2018	Nightingale	Best 60-Minute Teleplay	Winner	
2018	Nightingale	Emerging Screenwriters Award	Winner	
2017	The Face of the Earth	Diverse Voices Award	Winner	

== Bibliography ==
- Stories No One Hopes Are About Them (University of Iowa Press)
- "The Real India" (Virginia Quarterly Review)
- "Bottle Girl" (Electric Literature)
- "All the Places You Will Never Be Again" (Chicago Quarterly Review)
- "Misery & Company" (Creative Nonfiction)
- "Rabbitfish" (SmokeLong Quarterly)
- "Ori Dreams of a Tree" (City in a Wild Garden: Stories of the Nature of Cities)
- "The Third Trip" (Coastal Shelf)
- "Octopus" (Story)
- "Conservancy" (Litro)
- "The Voice as Heirloom" (Fiction International)
- "Obscure Trivia of the Antarctic" (Boulevard)
- "Mnemophobe" (Chicago Review)
- "Rosa" (Every Day Fiction)
- "Fall" (The Baltimore Review)
- "Ní de Aqui, Ní de Alla" (Arachne Press)
- "Casualty" (Columbia Journal)
- "Water & Earth" (Bad Bride)
- "Orphea" (Fearsome Critters)
- "Insertion" (The Offing)
- "Maslow's Hierarchy of Post-Pandemic Wish Fulfillment Fantasies" (McSweeney's)
- "The Body Electric" (Gertrude Press)
- "Walk-Off" (Hobart)
- "On the Negligible Proximity of Money and Mouths" (Heirlock)
- "Year of the Snake" (The Masters Review)
- "Totenhaus" (Black Static)
- "Eating the Leaves" (Lunch Ticket)
- "Sabbatical" (Cheap Pop)
- "Cain vs. Cain" (Iron Horse Literary Review)
- "Disenchantment" (Spider Road Press)
- "The Breakneck Boys" (Concīs)
