= Iowa Short Fiction Award =

Annual literary award

- Type: Short story award
- Country: United States
- Presented by: University of Iowa Press
- First award: 1969
- Website: uiowapress.org

The Iowa Short Fiction Award is an annual award given for a first collection of short fiction. It has been described as "a respected prize" by the Chicago Tribune, and The New York Times considered it "among the most prestigious literary prizes America offers."

The award was founded by the University of Iowa Press in 1969, and has been continuously presented to a writer of short stories each year since. In 1988, a companion award called the John Simmons Short Fiction Award, named for the original director of the University of Iowa Press, was instituted. Both the Iowa Short Fiction Award and the John Simmons Short Fiction Award are juried through the Iowa Writers' Workshop, and winning books are published by the University of Iowa Press.

Select stories from winning entries are included in The Iowa Award: The Best Stories from Twenty Years and The Iowa Award: The Best Stories, 1991-2000, with selections by American author Frank Conroy.

== Winners of the Iowa Short Fiction Award by year ==
- 2022: Stories No One Hopes Are About Them by A. J. Bermudez
- 2021: The Boundaries of Their Dwelling by Blake Sanz
- 2020: Father Guards the Sheep by Sari Rosenblatt
- 2019: Not a Thing to Comfort You by Emily Wortman-Wunder
- 2018: The Water Diviner and Other Stories by Ruvanee Pietersz Vilhauer
- 2017: Outside Is the Ocean by Matthew Lansburgh
- 2016: November Storm by Robert Oldshue
- 2015: Night in Erg Chebbi and Other Stories by Edward Hamlin
- 2014: The Lovers Set Down Their Spoons by Heather A. Slomski
- 2013: Lungs Full of Noise by Tessa Mellas
- 2012: Safe As Houses by Marie-Helene Bertino
- 2011: Power Ballads by Will Boast
- 2010: The Company of Heaven: Stories from Haiti by Marilène Phipps-Kettlewell
- 2009: All That Work and Still No Boys by Kathryn Ma
- 2008: Invite by Glen Pourciau
- 2007: Desert Gothic by Don Waters
- 2006: Things Kept, Things Left Behind by Jim Tomlinson
- 2005: The Thin Tear in the Fabric of Space by Doug Trevor
- 2004: What You've Been Missing by Janet Desaulniers
- 2003: Bring Me Your Saddest Arizona by Ryan Harty
- 2002: Her Kind of Want by Jennifer S. Davis
- 2001: Ticket to Minto: Stories of India and America by Sohrab Homi Fracis
- 2000: Troublemakers by John McNally
- 1999: House Fires by Nancy Reisman
- 1998: The River of Lost Voices: Stories from Guatemala by Mark Brazaitis
- 1997: Thank You for Being Concerned and Sensitive by Jim Henry
- 1996: Hints of His Mortality by David Borofka
- 1995: May You Live in Interesting Times by Tereze Glück
- 1994: Igloo Among Palms by Rod Val Moore
- 1993: Where Love Leaves Us by Renée Manfredi and Macauley's Thumb by Lex Williford
- 1992: My Body to You by Elizabeth Searle
- 1991: Traps by Sondra Spatt Olsen
- 1990: A Hole in the Language by Marly Swick
- 1989: Lent: The Slow Fast by Starkey Flythe, Jr.
- 1988: The Long White by Sharon Dilworth
- 1987: Fruit of the Month by Abby Frucht and Star Game by Lucia Nevai
- 1986: Eminent Domain by Dan O'Brien and Resurrectionists by Russell Working
- 1985: Dancing in the Movies by Robert Boswell
- 1984: Old Wives' Tales by Susan M. Dodd
- 1983: Heart Failure by Ivy Goodman
- 1982: Shiny Objects by Dianne Benedict
- 1981: The Phototropic Woman by Annabel Thomas
- 1980: Impossible Appetites by James Fetler
- 1979: Fly Away Home by Mary Hedin
- 1978: A Nest of Hooks by Lon Otto
- 1977: The Women in the Mirror by Pat Carr
- 1976: The Black Velvet Girl by C.E. Poverman
- 1975: Harry Belten and the Mendelssohn Violin Concerto by Barry Targan
- 1974: After the First Death There Is No Other by Natalie L. M. Petesch
- 1973: The Itinerary of Beggars by H. E. Francis
- 1972: The Burning and Other Stories by Jack Cady
- 1971: Old Morals, Small Continents, Darker Times by Philip F. O'Connor
- 1970: The Beach Umbrella by Cyrus Colter

== Winners of the John Simmons Short Fiction Award by year ==
- 2022: The Woods by Janice Obuchowski
- 2021: You Never Get It Back by Cara Blue Adams
- 2020: Ancestry by Eileen O'Leary
- 2019: Happy Like This by Ashley Wurzbacher
- 2018: The Lightning Jar by Christian Felt
- 2017: What Counts as Love by Marian Crotty
- 2016: Of This New World by Allegra Hyde
- 2015: Excommunicados by Charles Haverty
- 2014: Mystical Creatures Attack! by Kathleen Founds
- 2013: If I'd Known You Were Coming by Kate Milliken
- 2012: Tell Everyone I Said Hi by Chad Simpson
- 2011: Pulp and Paper by Josh Rolnick
- 2010: Lester Higata's 20th Century by Barbara Hamby
- 2009: How to Leave Hialeah: Stories from the Heart of Miami by Jennine Capó Crucet
- 2008: One Dog Happy by Molly McNett
- 2007: Whose World Is This? by Lee Montgomery
- 2006: Permanent Visitors by Kevin Moffett
- 2005: This Day in History by Anthony Varallo
- 2004: Here Beneath Low-Flying Planes by Merrill Feitell
- 2003: American Wives by Beth Helms
- 2002: The Kind of Things Saints Do by Laura Valeri
- 2001: Fire Road by Donald Anderson
- 2000: Articles of Faith by Elizabeth Oness
- 1999: Out of the Girls' Room and into the Night by Thisbe Nissen
- 1998: Friendly Fire by Kathryn Chetkovich
- 1997: Within the Lighted City by Lisa Lenzo
- 1996: Western Electric by Don Zancanella
- 1995: Listening to Mozart by Charles Wyatt
- 1994: The Good Doctor by Susan Onthank Mates
- 1993: Happiness by Ann Harleman
- 1992: Imaginary Men by Enid Shomer
- 1991: The Ant Generator by Elizabeth Harris
- 1989: Line of Fall by Miles Wilson
- 1988: The Venus Tree by Michael Pritchett

== Guest judges by year ==
- 2022: Anthony Marra
- 2021: Brandon Taylor
- 2020: Tom Drury
- 2019: Carmen Maria Machado
- 2018: Rebecca Lee
- 2017: Andre Dubus III
- 2016: Bennett Sims
- 2015: Karen Russell
- 2014: Wells Tower
- 2013: Julie Orringer
- 2012: Jim Shepard
- 2011: Yiyun Li
- 2000: Elizabeth McCracken
- 1999: Marilynne Robinson
- 1998: Stuart Dybek
- 1997: Ann Beattie
- 1996: Oscar Hijeulos
- 1995: Ethan Canin
- 1994: Joy Williams
- 1993: Francine Prose
- 1992: James Salter
- 1991: Marilynne Robinson
- 1990: Jayne Anne Phillips
- 1989: Gail Godwin
- 1988: Robert Stone
- 1987: Alison Lurie
- 1986: Tobias Wolff
- 1985: Tim O'Brien
- 1984: Frederick Busch
- 1983: Alice Adams
- 1982: Raymond Carver
- 1981: Doris Grumbach
- 1980: Francine du Plessix Gray
- 1979: John Gardner
- 1978: Stanley Elkin
- 1977: Leonard Michaels
- 1976: Donald Bathelme
- 1975: George P. Garrett
- 1974: William H. Gass
- 1973: John Hawkes
- 1972: Joyce Carol Oates
- 1971: George P. Elliott
- 1970: Vance Bourjaily and Kurt Vonnegut
