= Unhinged (1982 film) =

1982 American slasher film directed by Don Gronquist

- Promotional poster
- Directed by: Don Gronquist
- Written by: Don Gronquist; Reagan Ramsey
- Produced by: Don Gronquist
- Starring: Laurel Munson; J. E. Penner; Sara Ansley
- Cinematography: Richard Blakeslee
- Edited by: Bob Laird (Note: Credited as Phillips Blair.); Don Gronquist (Note: Credited as Foster Castleman.)
- Music by: Jonathan Newton
- Production company: Anavisio Productions
- Release dates: May 14, 1983 (Cannes); June 21, 1983 (United Kingdom); August 20, 1983 (NW Film Festival)
- Running time: 79 minutes
- Country: United States
- Language: English
- Budget: $100,000

Unhinged is a 1982 American slasher film directed by Don Gronquist in his directorial debut, written by Gronquist and Reagan Ramsey, and starring Laurel Munson, Janet Penner, Sara Ansley, Virginia Settle, and Barbara Lusch. The film follows three young women who, after suffering a car accident, are taken in by a mysterious spinster and her infirm mother at their rural mansion. Over the course of the next several days, the women are stalked by an unseen killer.

The screenplay for Unhinged was completed by Gronquist and Ramsey in September 1977, when it was registered for U.S. copyright. An independent film, Unhinged was produced on a budget of $100,000, with principal photography taking place in Gronquist's hometown of Portland, Oregon in the fall of 1981. The majority of the film was shot at the Pittock Mansion over 19 nights due to the estate's daily operation as a museum. Additional photography took place in St. Johns and Forest Park, as well as in Gronquist's own home. Gus Van Sant served as a location scout for the production.

Unhinged screened at the Cannes Film Festival's Marché du Film in May 1983, and was released on video shortly after in the UK by Avatar Communications. It subsequently appeared on the list of the UK's 72 "video nasties," which led to an expanded role for the BBFC. Numerous video copies of the film were seized and confiscated by the British government during police raids between 1983 and 1985. Despite censorship efforts for its home video release, the film received an 18 certificate from the BBFC for theatrical release, and screened throughout the UK in the latter half of 1983. In the USA, it opened at the Northwest Film & Video Festival in Portland on August 20, 1983.

Though the film received little critical attention at the time of its release, it has been subject to retrospective reviews and reassessment, receiving praise for its atmosphere, synthesizer-based musical score, and twist ending, with criticism aimed at its acting and pacing. In 2014, the film's original score by Jonathan Newton was ranked at number 40 in a list of the 100 greatest horror film scores by Fact magazine. The film has also been the topic of scholarly discussion due to its depiction of repression and gender dysphoria of its villain, and has also drawn comparisons to Alfred Hitchcock's Psycho (1960) and William Castle's Homicidal (1961). A loose remake was made in England and released in 2017, followed by a second remake, Unhinged Retribution in 2023.

== Plot ==
On October 22, 1981, (Note: A radio announcement from The Dave Hood Show at the beginning of the film places this as the day the film begins.) college students Terry, Nancy, and Gloria embark for a music festival in rural Washington. While driving on a forested road, the women smoke marijuana in the car, while a news radio broadcaster announces the recent disappearance of two teenage girls in the area. A sudden storm causes Nancy to accidentally crash, rendering all three unconscious.

Terry awakes to find her and her friends alive, sheltered in an isolated mansion owned by the Penroses: the middle-aged spinster Marion, her mother, and their groundskeeper, Norman. Gloria is the only one with serious injuries, so Marion suggests they spend the night until Gloria is able to leave. Terry and Nancy are invited to dinner with Marion and her elderly, senile, crippled mother. Throughout dinner, Marion's mother rants and raves, espousing her misandrist views, and recounts how her husband left her for another woman when the family lived as socialites in Rhode Island. She also recurrently accuses Marion of bringing men into the home. Later, while the women relax in the parlour, a mysterious man watches them through the windows.

Later that night, Terry finds a human tooth under her bed and subsequently awakens to the sound of a man breathing heavily upstairs. In the morning, Terry and Nancy take a shower, while someone spies on them through a peephole in the wall. Later that day, Nancy elects to walk to the local village alone and starts off through the woods. When she arrives at a rural country road, she is attacked by a cloaked figure with a long scythe, who slashes her to death. That evening at dinner, Mrs. Penrose continues to ramble about her disgust for men and harangues Marion, while Terry worries about Nancy's absence. Alone in her bedroom, Terry once again hears the breathing and goes to investigate. She searches the attic, where she finds black-and-white pictures of two children and an old tool belt containing a dusty handgun and a machete. She goes back downstairs and sees the man staring in at her through the window, and runs screaming through the house. Marion consoles her and reveals that the man is Carl, her developmentally disabled younger brother. Marion insists that he is harmless, and Terry goes back to bed.

The next day, Terry asks Norman if he has seen Nancy. Norman reveals that he never spoke with her, and instead tells her a confusing story about the two teenage girls who recently disappeared in the woods. At nightfall, Gloria regains consciousness, and Terry tells her she feels the two need to leave. When Terry leaves the room, an unseen figure attacks a sleeping Gloria, plunging a hatchet through her head. Later in the evening, Terry finds Gloria's room empty and asks Marion where she is. Marion suggests she may have gone outside for a breath of fresh air. As she steps outside, Terry is attacked and chased by Carl. She hides in a shed, where she discovers the dead bodies of her friends along with several other dismembered corpses. Carl breaks through the window and tries to grab her, but she manages to escape and runs back to the house as Carl chases after her.

Hurrying into the attic, Terry obtains the handgun and shoots Carl in the head, killing him. Marion rushes upstairs after hearing the struggle and chastises Terry for killing her brother. Terry responds by ordering Marion to search the shed. After a moment of silence, Marion, now speaking in a deep, masculine register, tells her that Carl had nothing to do with the corpses in the shed. Terry looks at Marion in confusion, who brandishes a machete. Marion reveals that she is actually Mrs. Penrose's second son, and Carl's younger biological brother, who dresses and presents as a woman. Terry attempts to flee, but Marion knocks her to the ground and maniacally stabs her to death whilst raving about the pressures of her gender dysphoria, and of her obligations to care for her brother and mother. As Terry bleeds to death on the floor, Mrs. Penrose calls for Marion from downstairs, asking if there is a man up there. Marion, covered in blood, responds in her feminine voice: "No, mother."

== Cast ==
- Laurel Munson as Terry Morgan
- Sara Ansley as Nancy Paulson
- Janet Penner as Marion Penrose (as J. E. Penner)
- Virginia Settle as Mrs. Penrose
- Barbara Lusch as Gloria
- John Morrison as Norman Barnes
- Bill Simmonds as Carl Penrose
- Francine Molter as Terry's mother (voice)
- Dave Hood as Radio DJ (voice)

== Production ==
=== Development ===
The original screenplay for Unhinged was written some time prior to late 1977 by Portland, Oregon native Don Gronquist and Reagan Ramsey, the latter of whom provided additional dialogue. The 145-page screenplay was registered for copyright in the USA on September 21, 1977. Commenting on its origins, Gronquist said that he and Ramsey devised the story together while drinking together in local bars: "We were sitting there talking about, how cheap can we make a movie? How cheap could we make a commercially viable 35 mm film?"

Prior to filming Unhinged, Gronquist had made his debut as a producer on the independent film Stark Raving Mad (1981), a biographical account of the murders committed by Charles Starkweather and Caril Ann Fugate.

Unhinged was executive-produced by Dale Farr, with Dan Biggs serving as an associate producer.

=== Casting ===
The cast was made up entirely of Portland locals, including stage actresses Janet Penner and Virginia Settle as Marion and Mrs. Penrose, respectively. Local stage actor John Morrison was cast in the film as Norman Barnes, a mansion groundskeeper. Sara Ansley, who portrayed Nancy, was a model whom Gronquist hired through a talent agency. Laurel Munson, who portrays the lead role of Terry, was also a model.

=== Filming ===
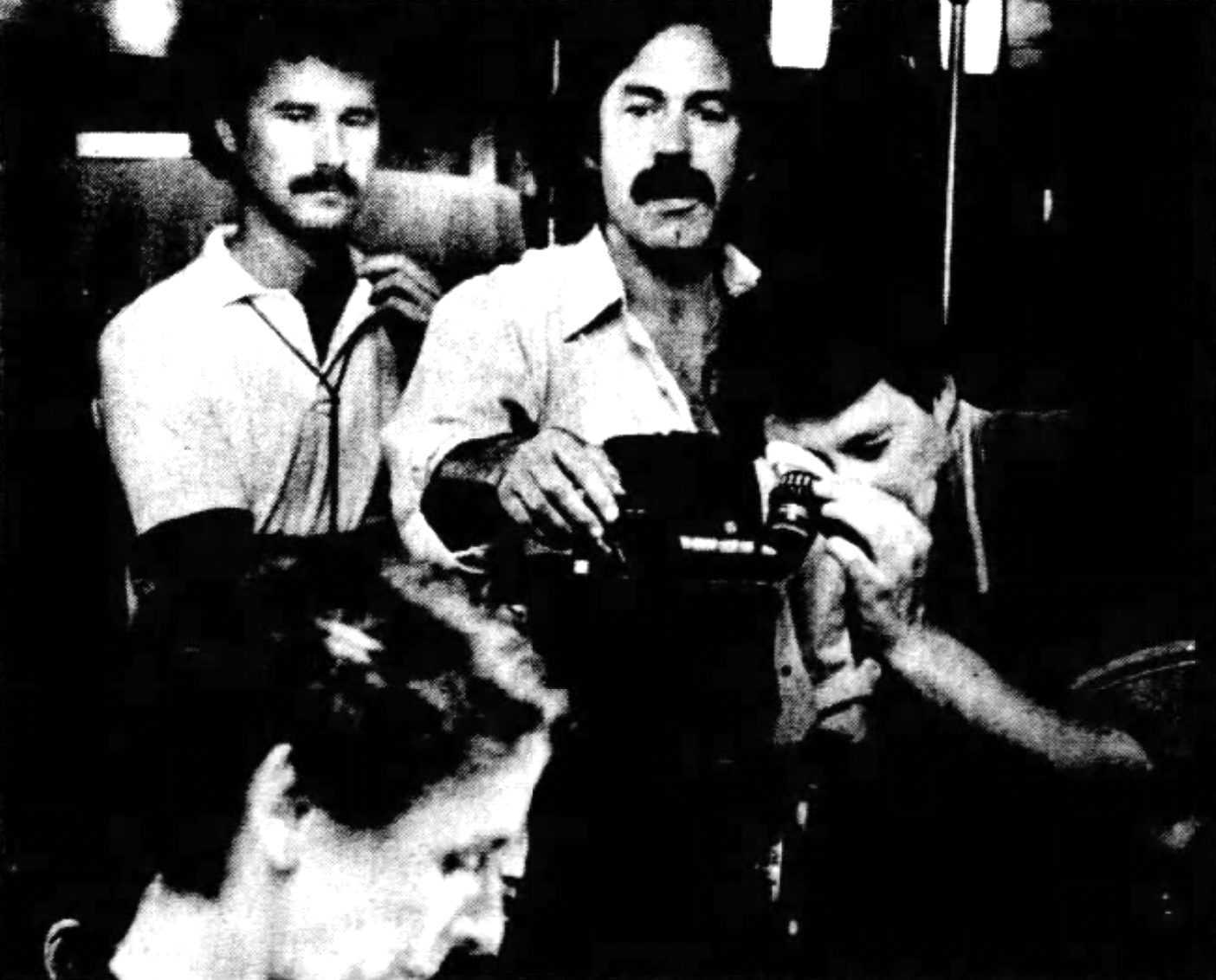
Clockwise, left to right: Camera operator Harry Dawson, cinematographer Richard Blakeslee, director Don Gronquist, and actress Janet Penner filming Unhinged

Unhinged was produced on a budget of $100,000, which included funds from local investors, including helicopter and aviation entrepreneur Betsy Johnson, a friend of Gronquist's who later became an Oregon State Senator. The crew was hired locally out of Portland and Corvallis. Local filmmaker Gus Van Sant assisted as a location scout for the production.

Principal photography of Unhinged took place over a six-week period in the fall of 1981 (Note: A behind-the-scenes photograph of actress Janet Penner taken by photographer Brent Wohjan was published by The Oregonian on October 13, 1981, in which journalist Ted Mahar noted that filming had recently concluded.) by cinematographer Richard Blakeslee at the Pittock Mansion, an historic 22-room French Renaissance-style château in Portland, built in 1914. Jan Baross, a local filmmaker and production assistant, helped secure the mansion as a filming location. Because Pittock Mansion is a tourist attraction and city property, the bulk of the film had to be shot overnights from approximately 5:00 p.m. to 7:00 a.m. over a course of nineteen evenings. The night shoots were described as "a disruption in the lives of everyone involved," with dinner breaks occurring at 10:00 p.m. Gronquist's wife, Wendy, served as production assistant on the film, preparing meals for the cast and crew, while Sol Leibowitz served as production designer.

Reflecting on the shoot in a newsletter during production, Blakeslee commented: "Don is going a little crazy by this time, zeroing in on something new every day.... The one we enjoy most is, 'I've lost my pages!' This is in reference to his script…which he has taken apart and carries around like a bundle of autumn leaves; at various times, these will be lost, splattered with stage blood, misplaced, left in other rooms, soaked with water, covered with muddy footprints."

Additional photography took place in Forest Park; the film's opening scenes feature shots of the St. Johns Bridge, and the road accident scene was filmed on Northwest Germantown Road near Linnton in North Portland. The interiors of the attic were shot in Gronquist's own house. The film's special makeup effects were created by Janet Scoutten, who had recently designed special effects for the slasher film The Slumber Party Massacre. Filming was completed by mid-October 1981. The film was processed locally by TekniFilmLabs, a film processing lab in Portland. On October 30, 1981, Gronquist and actress Janet Penner appeared on a local public TV segment to promote the film.

== Music ==
Unhinged boasts an original score by Jonathan Newton, who later scored Shadow Play, starring Dee Wallace and Cloris Leachman, before becoming a professor of music at PSU.

In 2014, the British music publication Fact magazine ranked the film's score at number 40 in a list of the 100 greatest horror film scores of all time. The list's compilers, John Twells and Joseph Morpurgo, noted: "Newton’s score for synth marries Carpenter-style moodiness with unusually dynamic drum programming, and, simply put, ticks all the boxes: genuinely killer theme, impressive atmospherics, [and] occasional moments of unsignposted lunacy." Bart Bealmear, writing for DangerousMinds.net in 2018, praised the score as "exceptional" and "stellar," noting that it "is easily the best part of the picture." In a press release for a 2019 screening at the Spectacle Theater, Newton's composition was likened to "a black mass that’s being sabotaged by an all-skeleton Soft Cell cover band."

In addition to its original score, the film features the classical compositions "Piano Concerto No. 20 in D minor" by Wolfgang Amadeus Mozart, and "Nocturne (Bal Phantôme)" by Francis Poulenc. (Note: Adapted from the film's closing credits.)

== Release ==
Unhinged screened at the Cannes Marché du Film on May 14, 1983. It was released theatrically in the United Kingdom on June 21, 1983, with an 18 certificate. It continued to show on British screens in numerous cities including Manchester, Lancashire, London, Bolton, and Coventry, among others, through December of that year. It was sometimes paired as a double feature with Patrick (1978) and Screwballs (1983).

In the United States, it was shown on August 20, 1983, at the Northwest Film & Video Festival in Portland, Oregon.

=== Censorship ===
Although the BBFC had passed the film uncut for UK cinemas in 1983, the UK DPP retroactively banned the video release, placing Unhinged on its list of 72 "video nasties", which violated the Obscene Publications Act (as amended in 1977). Unlike other films on that list, the film's few murders were suggested (by sprays of blood) rather than explicitly depicted, and it featured few scenes of nudity. The film was profiled among several others by the BBC following its 1983 video release.

The film was one of several titles whose videos were confiscated by the British government during police raids beginning in December 1983, alongside The Boogeyman (1980), The Driller Killer (1979), and The Last House on the Left (1972). It was confiscated again in August 1984 in Wigan, Greater Manchester. While the DPP officially removed the film from its video nasty list in May 1985, it continued to be confiscated through the rest of that year: In October 1985, the film—among 67 other titles—was confiscated from a video rental shop in North Shields, as well as from a rental shop in Shanklin on the Isle of Wight in November 1985. It was not submitted for approval by distributors until 2005, when it was finally passed fully uncut in the United Kingdom.

=== Home media ===
Unhinged was released in the UK on a pre-certification VHS by the CBS/Fox subsidiary Avatar Communications in April 1983. This release became one of the best-selling videocassettes in England that summer. In Australia, a VHS was released by CBS/Fox Video the same year. In Spain, the film was issued on VHS in 1984 under the title Demencial Unhinged by I.V.E. (Intervideo Española). In 1988, the Portland-based Lighthouse Home Video released the film on VHS in the USA.

On October 8, 2002, IndieDVD released Unhinged on DVD in the USA. It was subsequently issued in the UK on DVD in 2004 through Platinum Home Video, uncut and with an '18' certificate. In the USA, the film received two other DVD reissues from different distributors: On March 22, 2005, Brentwood Home Video released it on DVD, followed by a Code Red release in 2012 as a double feature disc with Murder Run (1983), a film produced by Gronquist.

The film was released in a remastered DVD edition in the UK by 88 Films in 2014. Despite its remastering, the transfer was described in Delirium magazine "as rough and ready-looking as ever" due to the lack of any known high-definition masters. In a 2021 interview with David Gregory, a co-founder of Severin Films, he commented on the film's home media status, stating that "there are no [original] film elements [known] in the world. There’s basically a one-inch master in London, and it’s not even as good as a DVD!"

On October 17, 2026, Severin Films released a limited VHS edition of the film in honor of Video Store Day.

== Reception ==
=== Critical response ===
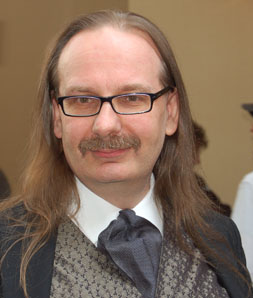
British film critic Kim Newman criticized Unhinged for its extensive use of dialogue

Reviewing the film during its British theatrical release for The Monthly Film Bulletin, Kim Newman described it as "interminable" and wrote that it "draws itself out with acres of overblown dialogue." In his subsequent book Nightmare Movies: Horror on Screen Since the 1960s, Newman was again critical of the film, calling it a "sickle-slicker slasher so inept that the clapperboard can twice be discerned in the grey murk during a slow fade."

A review by TV Guide noted: "In this film, J. E. Penner is one of the few cast members left in one piece by a mysterious serial killer. Props essential to the action include machetes, scythes, and power saws. The climactic showdown between heroine and villain is as predictable as it is inevitable." D. K. Holm, reviewing the film for DVD Talk in 2003, described it as an amalgam of Homicidal (1961), The Last House on the Left (1972), and Friday the 13th (1980) and noted giallo influences in the film, but criticized it for its extensive use of dialogue, which he felt resulted in "long, aimless scenes padding out its 79 minute running time."

In a retrospective review of the film, Gregory Burkart of Blumhouse wrote of the film:

"The main issue for most viewers is going to be the film’s rather leisurely pace; the filmmakers apparently attempted to position Unhinged as more psychological thriller than chop-em-up slasher, but instead of slowly building tension and suspense, the script frequently leaves the characters lounging around with nothing much to do except talk and sleep (both of which they do a lot). A tighter edit might have helped speed things along, but considering the film’s ultra-lean runtime of under 80 minutes, I’m not sure that would have even been possible."

In Scott Aaron Stine's The Gorehound's Guide to Splatter Films of the 1980s, he writes: "Although not a bad film, Unhinged is exceptionally slow; the abundance of talking heads actually slackens much of the suspense and tension the film strives to generate. And despite some wonderful plot twists—the above average shock ending is a pleasant surprise—the scriptwriting rarely rises above that of pulp horror, derivative of such films as Three on a Meathook (1973)," though he concedes that it "showed so much promise for a debut." Film critic Kat Ellinger, writing for Scream magazine, praised the film's "wonderfully bleak and nihilistic atmosphere," adding that it owes "a great debt to the exploitation films of the former decade. There might not be much in the way of action, but what does occur is worthwhile. The ending, especially, was fairly shocking and brutal for its day, and still manages to strike a chord in its delivery-tinged with a glorious nastiness you can almost taste, there is something quite delightfully feral about the film’s parting blow."

Jerome Reuter of Dread Central praised the film in a 2017 retrospective, noting: "While it isn’t the blood-splattered mayhem of Violent Shit, or the psychological portrait of Bill Lustig’s Maniac, it certainly deserves recognition among genre fans as an underrated gem... Unquestionably, the greatest attribute of Unhinged is its pacing best described as a slow burn. The story builds up gradually, and unlike some of its contemporaries, it restrains itself a great deal with its content."

Writing on Unhinged for the film review website Bleeding Skull, Joseph A. Ziemba praised it, noting: "The music is perfect for a midnight axe murder, but totally surreal when it accompanies a dinner scene. There’s also Laurel Munson’s loud-yet-medicated lead performance as Terry, which wouldn’t feel out of place in John Waters’ Multiple Maniacs. These dream-like details enhance the grim reveals, making the movie feel damaged on multiple levels. Unhinged might be a terrific sleep aid, but it's also a gloomy slasher mood piece—the kind that will never exist again." Dan Budnik, who co-authored Bleeding Skull!: A 1980s Trash-Horror Odyssey (2013) with Ziemba, commended the film in that book, describing it as a slasher variation of The Cat and the Canary and praised its "sparse, atmospheric synth score." Actress Janet Penner's performance received praise from Chris Alexander of Delirium magazine, despite his criticism of the film's direction: "Though atmospheric and showing a great flair for uncomfortable detail, Gronquist’s direction is, even with such a scant seventy-odd minute run time, a touch lax; especially so during Unhinged's more standard dramatic moments."

In The Mammoth Book of Slasher Movies (2012), writer Peter Normanton was critical of the film's performances, but conceded that director Gronquist "distinguished himself in creating a lingering sense of suspense and shocked his audience with only the use of occasional but effective gore." An assessment written for a screening of the film by the Spectacle Theater in 2019 also critiqued the performances as ranging "in tone from ‘on too many painkillers’ to ‘community theater Tennessee Williams’, only adding to the surreal-dreamlike feel of the whole thing... Unhinged is way more fun and moody than your average video nasty." Paul Le, writing for Screen Rant in 2019, commented on the film: "Unhinged moves at a slow pace like other slashers from this same time period, but even more so because the cast is, after all, considerably small. However, there is ample atmosphere in this unhurried mystery. There is even a twist ending that will catch you off guard."

=== Themes and analysis ===
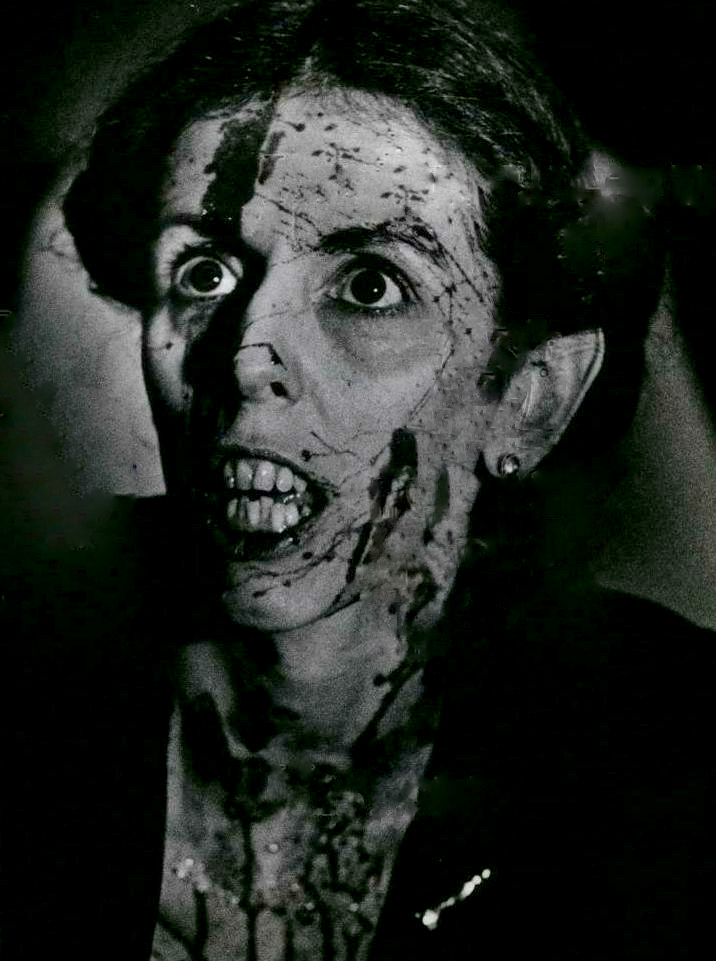
Marion (pictured in the final scene) has been noted by scholars for her revelation as being transgender in the film's twist ending

Unhinged has been noted by some film scholars for its dealing with themes of repression and gender dysphoria. Writing in Serial Killer Cinema: An Analytical Filmography with an Introduction (2003), Robert Cettl analyzes the character of Marion, the villain who is a biological male presenting as a female: "Unhinged portrays the society of women as monstrous, perverse abhorrence which corrupts the male and, ironically, consumes itself. The killer, whose aggressive gaze is coded as masculine, considers such young women groveling, subhuman figures, and his crimes are in part expressions of the person he has been forced to become, and the gender he has been forced to adopt. It is self-hatred and gender confusion as much as it is misogyny." Cettl connects this element of the film as being inspired by Alfred Hitchcock's Psycho (1960). Normanton similarly described the film's twist ending as an "inversion" of the twist featured in Psycho, an attribute he feels "elevates the film above so many of its contemporaries."

Anna Bogutskaya of Little White Lies likened the film to a "low-rent version" of The Beguiled (1971) in a 2021 review, observing that "the odd, emotionally abusive and codependent relationship between mother and daughter is the true horror of the film... They run their household like a deranged matriarchy, treating any men in the household as second-class citizens." Reviewer Chris Alexander of Delirium magazine associates the film with the psycho-biddy sub-genre due to its depiction of mentally deranged middle-aged and elderly women.

In the book Bleeding Skull!: A 1980s Trash-Horror Odyssey (2013), writer Dan Budnik observes that the film also contains themes of the degradation of high society and intra-familial turbulence, noting that, despite its setting in the 1980s, "many of the main elements of the film harken back to decades past. The old mansion, far away from civilization, is one of the big ones. There's also the constant rain, the members of high society collapsing, and something evil lurking in the house. All of this ties into some sort of familial trouble rooted in events from long ago."

=== Legacy ===
In the years since its release, Unhinged has developed a cult following. Kat Ellinger, reviewing the film in Scream magazine in 2014, commented on the film's obscurity, noting that it "tends to float under the radar of many horror fans, and vastly deserves much more attention than it has had over the years."

The film received a 30th-anniversary revival screening at Portland's Hollywood Theatre on August 21, 2012. It received another revival screening at New York City's Spectacle Theater in 2019.

== Related works ==
A remake of the film was produced in England and released in 2017. In December 2022, a second remake was announced, with Winnie-the-Pooh: Blood and Honey (2023) producer Scott Jeffrey attached at that time. The second remake, Unhinged Retribution, was released in 2023 by ITN Distribution.

== Sources ==
- Albright, Brian (2012). Regional Horror Films, 1958-1990: A State-by-State Guide with Interviews. Jefferson, North Carolina: McFarland & Company. ISBN 978-0-786-47227-7.
- Cettl, Robert (2003). Serial Killer Cinema: An Analytical Filmography with an Introduction. Jefferson, North Carolina: McFarland & Company. ISBN 978-0-7864-1292-1.
- Cook, Scott; Wade, Aimee (2014). PDXccentric: An Odyssey of Portland Oddities. Portland, Oregon: Slough Biscuit Press. ISBN 978-0-979-92327-2.
- Gronquist, Don (2012). Unhinged (DVD audio commentary). Code Red.
- Library of Congress (1977). Catalog of Copyright Entries: Third Series. Washington, D.C.: Library of Congress. ISSN 0090-8371.
- McKenna, Mark (2020). Nasty Business: The Marketing and Distribution of the Video Nasties. Edinburgh, Scotland: Edinburgh University Press. ISBN 978-1-474-45110-9.
- Martin, John Wiley (2007). Seduction of the Gullible: The Truth Behind the Video Nasty Scandal. Liskeard, Cornwall: Stray Cat Publishing. ISBN 978-0-953-32618-1.
- Newman, Kim (2011). Nightmare Movies: Horror On Screen Since the 1960s. London, England: Bloomsbury. ISBN 978-1-408-80503-9.
- Normanton, Peter (2012). The Mammoth Book of Slasher Movies. London, England: Robinson. ISBN 978-0-762-44596-7.
- Stine, Scott Aaron (2003). The Gorehound's Guide to Splatter Films of the 1980s. Jefferson, North Carolina: McFarland & Company. ISBN 978-0-786-41532-8.
- Ziemba, Joseph A.; Budnik, Dan (2013). Bleeding Skull!: A 1980s Trash-Horror Odyssey. London, England: Headpress. ISBN 978-1-900-48688-0.
