= Stark Raving Mad =

Stark Raving Mad can refer to:

- Stark Raving Mad (1981 film), depicting a fictional account of the Charles Starkweather/Carol Fugate killings
- Stark Raving Mad (TV series), a 1999 NBC sitcom
- Stark Raving Mad (2002 film)
