= Ann Harleman =

American novelist

- Born: Youngstown, Ohio, U.S.
- Occupation: Novelist; scholar; professor
- Education: Rutgers University (BA); Princeton University; Brown University (MFA)
- Notable awards: O. Henry Award (2003); Rona Jaffe Foundation Writers' Award (2004)
- Spouse: Bruce Rosenberg (m. 1981; died 2010)

Website
- annharleman.com

Ann Harleman is an American novelist, scholar, and professor.

== Early life and education ==
Harleman was born in Ohio. When she was four years old, her family moved to Bethlehem, Pennsylvania, where her father worked for Bethlehem Steel. As a child, she wrote mystery stories in the style of the Nancy Drew novels.

Aiming for a career in academia, she earned the B.A. degree at Rutgers University. In 1972, she became the first woman to earn the doctorate in linguistics at Princeton.

In 1988 she earned a M.F.A. in creative writing at Brown University

== Career ==
=== Academia ===
After earning her PhD, Harleman taught linguistics at the University of Washington. In 1976, she took part in a six-month exchange program in Russia.

After moving to Rhode Island in 1983, she became a visiting scholar at Brown's American Civilization department and later a lecturer at the Rhode Island School of Design.

=== Writing ===
She began to write short stories, submitting some annually for the Iowa Short Fiction contest. In 1994, her collection of short stories, Happiness, won the Iowa Short Fiction Award.

== Honors and awards ==
Harleman has received numerous awards, including the Guggenheim and Rockefeller fellowships, the Berlin Prize in Literature, the Iowa Short Fiction Award, the PEN Syndicated Fiction Award, and the O. Henry Award.

- Guggenheim Fellowship, 1976
- Raymond Carver Prize, 1986
- Chris O'Malley Fiction Prize, 1987
- Chicago Tribune Nelson Algren Award, 1987
- NEH Fellow, Institute for Literary Translation, 1988
- Rockefeller Foundation Artist’s Fellow, 1989
- Judith Siegel Pearson Award, 1991
- PEN Syndicated Fiction Award, 1991
- Iowa Short Fiction Award, 1993
- Berlin Prize in Literature, 2000
- Zoetrope All-Story Short Fiction Prize, 2002
- O. Henry Award, 2003
- Goodheart Prize for Fiction, 2004
- Rona Jaffe Foundation Writers' Award, 2004

== Personal life ==
Harleman married folklore scholar Bruce Rosenberg in 1981. He was diagnosed with multiple sclerosis in 1990 and died in 2010.

== Works ==
Harleman is the author of the story collections Thoreau’s Laundry and Happiness, and the novels The Year She Disappeared and Bitter Lake.

- The Cost of Anything, 1988 (thesis submitted at Brown University)
- Mute Phone Calls, by Ruth Zernova (translated from Russian), 1991
- Happiness: Stories, 1994 (reprinted 2008)
- Bitter Lake: A Novel, 1996
- Thoreau’s Laundry: Stories, 2007
- The Year She Disappeared: A Novel, 2008

=== Non-fiction ===
- Graphic Representation of Models in Linguistic Theory, 1976 (as Ann Harleman Stewart)
- Ian Fleming: A Critical Biography, 1989 (co-authored with Bruce A. Rosenberg)

==== Articles ====
- "Kenning and Riddle in Old English." Papers on Language and Literature, vol. 15, issue 2 (spring 1979): 115–136
- "The Solution to Old English Riddle 4." Studia Philologica, vol. 78 (1981)
- "The Role of Narrative Structure in the Transmission of Ideas", in Textual Dynamics of the Professions, 1991
