= Metro Headquarters Building =

Government office in Los Angeles, US

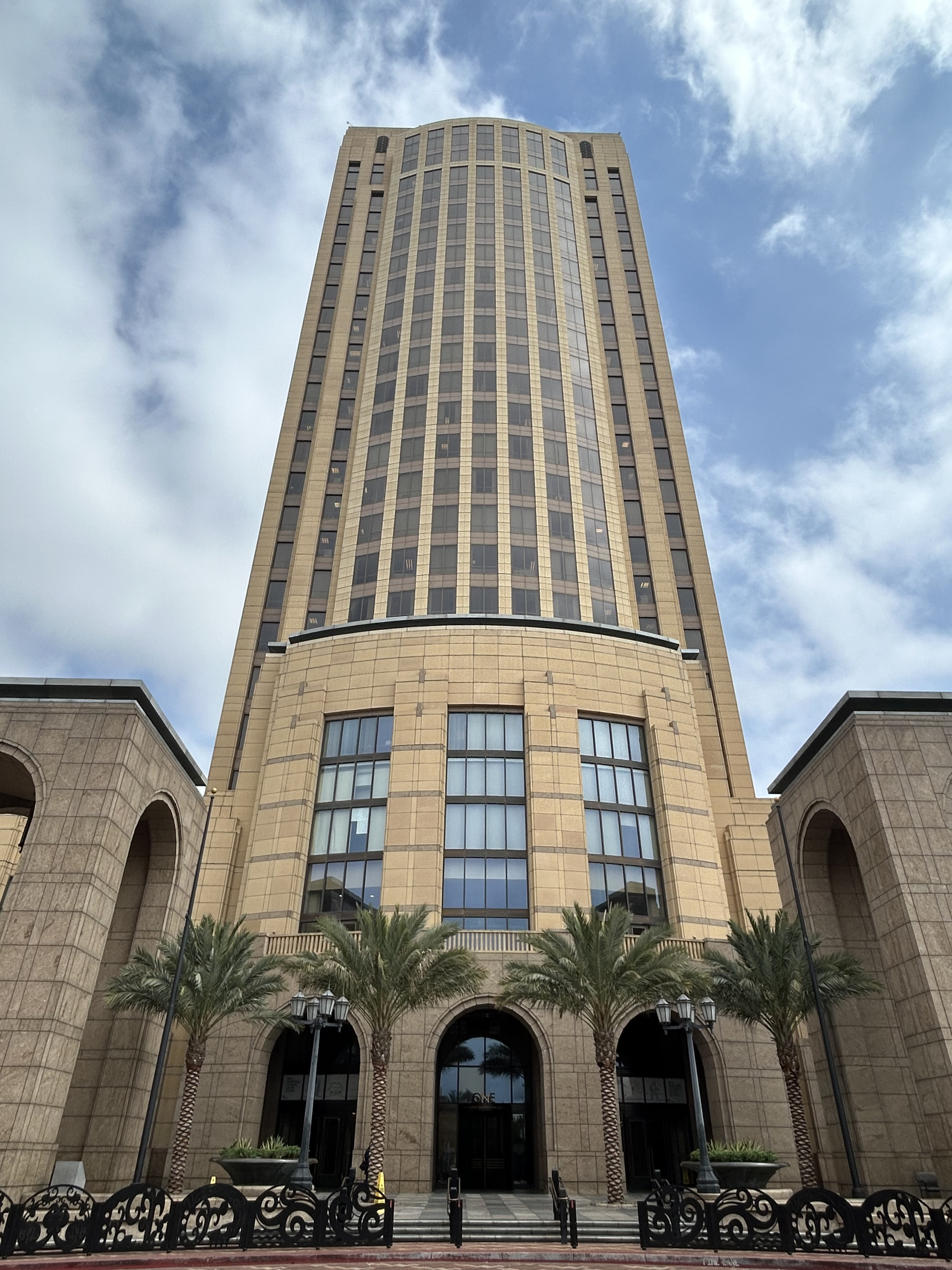
- Interactive map of the Metro Headquarters Building area
- Alternative names: One Gateway Plaza

General information
- Type: Governmental office
- Location: 1 Gateway Plaza; Downtown Los Angeles, California; United States
- Coordinates: 34°3′23.2″N 118°13′58.6″W
- Current tenants: Los Angeles Metro
- Construction started: 1992
- Completed: 1995
- Cost: $145.5 million

Height
- Roof: 398 ft (121 m)

Technical details
- Floor count: 26
- Floor area: 650,000 sq ft (60,000 m^{2})

Design and construction
- Architects: McLarand Vasquez Emsiek & Partners
- Main contractor: Charles Pankow Builders, Ltd.

Other information
- Parking: 3,000 spaces
- Public transit: Union Station; Patsaouras Transit Plaza

The Metro Headquarters Building (or One Gateway Plaza) is a 398 ft (121 m) high rise office tower in Los Angeles, California. It is located in Northeastern Downtown Los Angeles, east across the tracks from Union Station.

Completed in 1995, it serves as the main headquarters for Los Angeles Metro.

== Building ==
The Metro Headquarters Building was designed by McLarand Vasquez Emsiek & Partners and completed in 1995. The $145.5 million building is the main fixture of the Patsaouras Transit Plaza and features exquisite artwork and restaurants throughout the exterior facades and the interior lobby. The main boardroom seats 350 people. The building's design features a blend of contextual influences of 1930s Hispanic-Deco and post-modern architecture. It features four levels of park & ride underground parking. The building was also home to the Southern California Regional Rail Authority (Metrolink) from 2011 to 2018.

=== In Media ===
The construction of this building was filmed in the 1994 children's video There Goes a Bulldozer, where Dave Hood climbed a tower crane and the 1994 children's video of How We Work - Building Construction.

In the Star Trek: Voyager episode "Future's End", a digitally-altered image of the building was used to represent the 1996 headquarters of villain Henry Starling (Ed Begley, Jr.). The building was again seen, this time on a matte painting depicting a building on the Mari homeworld in the Star Trek: Voyager episode "Random Thoughts" in 1997.

== Criticism ==
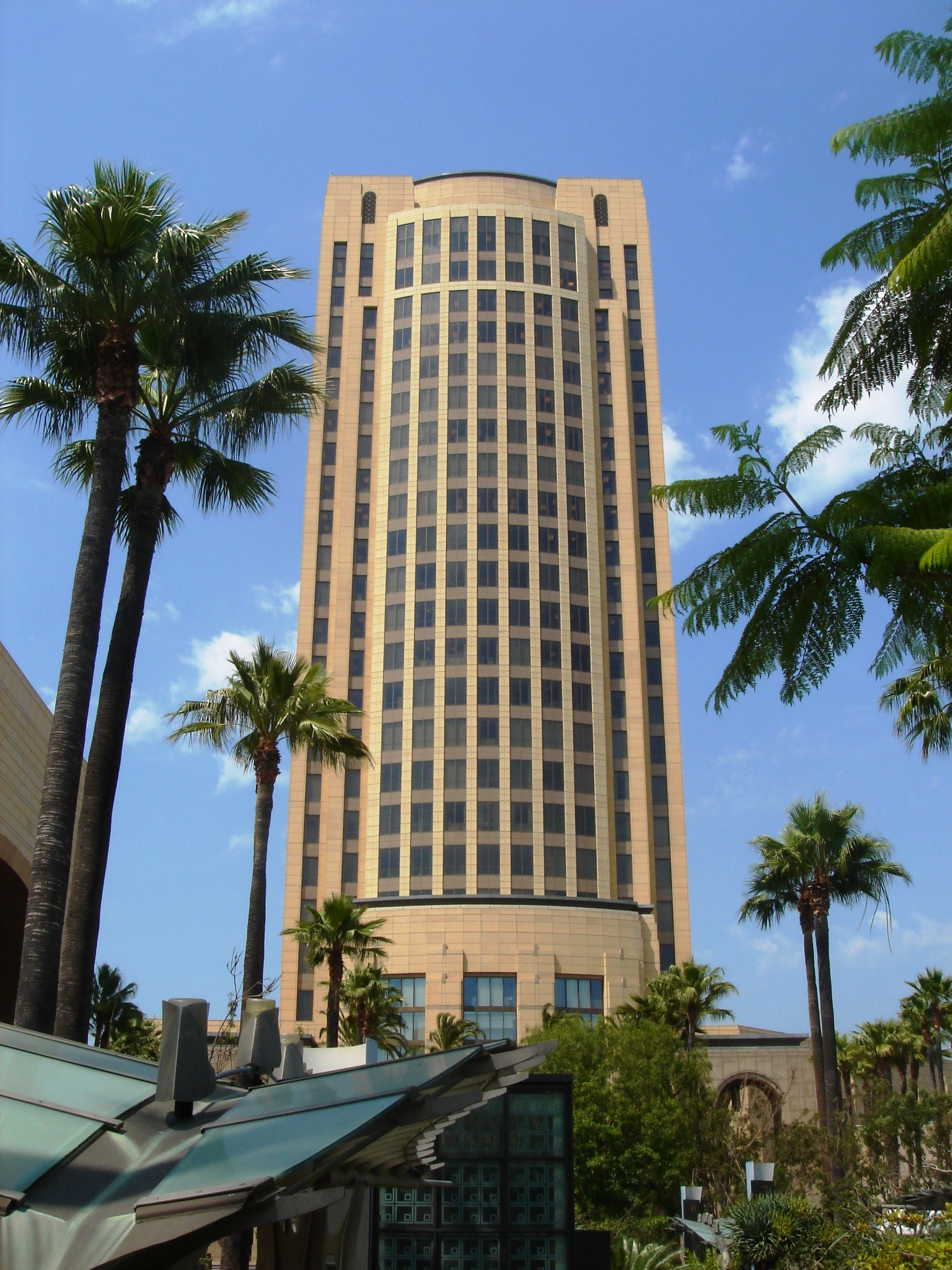
Metro Headquarters Building in 2007

Prior to its completion, the building was criticized for its use of expensive construction materials as a public agency. One critic dubbed it as a "Taj Mahal" in reference to its Italian granite, English brick and a $300,000 aquarium. However, proponents of the project argued that it would spur development around Union Station and create a new public gathering place.

== See also ==
- List of tallest buildings in Los Angeles
