= Sohrab Homi Fracis =

American novelist

- Born: August 19, 1958 (age 68); Bombay, India
- Education: Campion School, Mumbai; IIT Kharagpur (BTech); University of Delaware (MCE); University of North Florida (MA)
- Occupation: Author
- Parent(s): Homi Fracis; Dinsi Fracis
- Writing career
- Notable awards: Iowa Short Fiction Award (2001)
- Website: www.fracis.com

Sohrab Homi Fracis (born August 19, 1958) is the first Asian American author to win the Iowa Short Fiction Award, juried by the Iowa Writers' Workshop and described by The New York Times Book Review as "among the most prestigious literary prizes America offers."

Fracis was born in Bombay (now Mumbai), India, on August 19, 1958, to Homi and Dinsi Fracis. His sister, Niloufer, was born three years earlier. Having earned an Indian School Certificate at Campion School, Mumbai, he moved across the country for a B.Tech. at the Indian Institute of Technology Kharagpur, and then across the world, on a scholarship, for an M.C.E. at the University of Delaware.

As a systems analyst at Fortune 100 companies such as Ford, the only writing he did was handwriting. A handwriting newspaper column in Detroit analyzed his handwriting, after which the columnist shared his cursive sample with an analysts’ club. They declared his evolved Indian style to be a creative one, suggested he had unusual insights, and recommended that he share them. A few years later, while working in Jacksonville, Florida, he accepted his calling to become a writer.

He went back to school for an M.A. in English, with a concentration in creative writing, at the University of North Florida. That made him the rare person with engineering and fiction theses in the United States library system. He taught literature and creative writing at UNF from 1993 to 2003. From 1994 to 2001 he was a fiction and poetry editor at the now defunct State Street Review. In 1999, he became an American citizen. From 2004 to 2008 he was the final judge and presenter of the Page Edwards Short Fiction Award at the also defunct Florida First Coast Writers' Festival. In 2004 he was Visiting Writer in Residence at Augsburg College, Minneapolis. In 2006 he was an artist in residence at Escape to Create, Seaside, Florida. In 2007 he was an artist in residence at the art colony of Yaddo in Saratoga Springs, New York. And in 2010 Yaddo selected him again. Since 2009, he has led a summer fiction workshop at the UNF Writers Conference. In 2013, he became an Overseas Citizen of India, the closest thing to dual citizenship that India allows.

Fracis' fiction found publication in Other Voices (magazine), Chicago; India Currents, San Jose; State Street Review, Jacksonville; The Antigonish Review, Nova Scotia; Weber Studies, Utah; The Toronto Review, Toronto; Ort der Augen, Germany; Writecorner website, Gainesville, Fla.; South Asian Review, Pennsylvania; and Slice Magazine, New York. In addition to letters to the editor in The New Yorker, his literary commentary has been in The Florida Times-Union, FEZANA Journal, and The News India-Times.

In 1999, he was awarded the Florida Individual Artist Fellowship in Literature. His collection, Ticket to Minto: Stories of India and America, was a finalist for the Flannery O'Connor Award for Short Fiction. In 2001, the book won the Iowa Short Fiction Award and was published by the University of Iowa Press. In 2002, he was awarded a Walter E. Dakin Fellowship in Fiction at the Sewanee Writers' Conference, Tennessee. That year, Ticket to Minto was released in India by Indialog Publications. Its German translation by Thomas Loschner, Fahrschein bis Minto, was released by Mitteldeutscher Verlag at the 2006 Frankfurt Book Fair and selected one of the year's Most Beautiful Books by the Stiftung Deutsche Buchkunst (German Foundation for Book Art).

Fracis' themes deal with displacement, alienation, injustice, culture clash, and cross-cultural bridges. These themes reappear in excerpts from a forthcoming novel called Go Home. An excerpt, "Distant Vision," was published in Slice Magazine and nominated for a 2010 Pushcart Prize. Another excerpt, "Country Roads," appeared in South Asian Review. He is represented by New York literary agent Irene Skolnick, who also represents Vikram Seth (A Suitable Boy) and Joyce Johnson (Minor Characters).
