= Edward Hamlin =

Edward Hamlin may refer to:

- Edward Hamlin (fiction writer) (born 1959), American writer and composer
- Edward S. Hamlin (1808–1894), American politician from Ohio
- Edward O. Hamlin (1828-1895), American politician from Minnesota
