= Chad Simpson (disambiguation) =

Chad Simpson (born 1985), American football player.

Chad Simpson may also refer to:

- Chad Simpson (author), short and flash fiction author and Micro Award winner
- Chad Simpson (curler) in 2011 The Dominion Tankard
