= New Letters =

Coordinates: 39°2′11″N 94°34′41″W

- Language: English
- Edited by: Robert Stewart

Publication details
- Former names: The University Review, The University of Kansas City Review
- History: 1934-present
- Publisher: University of Missouri–Kansas City (United States)
- Frequency: Quarterly

Standard abbreviations
- ISO 4: New Lett.

Indexing
- ISSN: 0146-4930
- OCLC no.: 1759882

Links
- Journal homepage

New Letters is a non-profit literary magazine and one of the oldest quarterly publications in the United States. Published twice annually in two double issues, the magazine is based in Kansas City, Missouri. New Letters publishes Poetry, Fiction, and Creative Nonfiction in digital and print formats.

== History and editors ==
The University Review was founded in 1934 at the University of Kansas City, a small, private school that later became part of the University of Missouri system. In its first two years, the periodical published a discussion on "Art and Social Struggle," including contributions from Thomas Hart Benton and Diego Rivera, a story by Vance Randolph, a poem by Edgar Lee Masters, and a personal note from Pearl S. Buck.

Starting with the Spring 1938 issue, Alexander P. Cappon became editor and remained in that post for the next 33 years. In 1944 the magazine's name was changed to The University of Kansas City Review. In that time the magazine published work by May Sarton, J.D. Salinger, E.E. Cummings, Marianne Moore, May Swenson, James T. Farrell, Kenneth Rexroth.

In 1971, poet David Ray took over as editor, and the magazine's name was changed to New Letters. Ray founded the radio program New Letters on the Air, which aired on NPR stations. Ray published work by Robert Bly, Cyrus Colter, Anselm Hollo, Joyce Carol Oates, Richard Hugo, Robert Peters and Josephine Jacobsen.

In 1986, James McKinley became editor, and under his editorship the magazine published new work by Amiri Baraka, Thomas Berger, former President Jimmy Carter, Annie Dillard, Tess Gallagher, William Gass, Charles Simic, John Updike, and Miller Williams.

Robert Stewart took over as editor-in-chief in September 2002, serving in that role for eighteen years. He also took the helm of New Letters on the Air and the magazine's affiliate book imprint, BkMk Press. During his tenure, the magazine tripled its yearly circulation to 12,000, making it one of the top-read literary publications in the country. Stewart also oversaw an increase in the variety of material at the magazine. During this period, the magazine published writers such as Brian Doyle, Quincy Troupe, Daniel Woodrell, Sherman Alexie, Sergio Troncoso, Marilyn Hacker, Maxine Kumin and Charlotte Holmes.

Christie Hodgen became editor-in-chief in 2020. She planned to digitize the magazine's 86 years of back issues, making them available to the public.

New Letters won the National Magazine Award for the essay on May 1, 2008, at Lincoln Center in New York. The winning essay was "I Am Joe's Prostate," by Thomas E. Kennedy.

=== New Letters on the Air ===
In 1977, editor David Ray and his wife, Judy, began the audio literature program New Letters on the Air, a half-hour radio program featuring writers reading from their work and talking about it.

Rebekah Presson produced and hosted the show until 1996, when Angela Elam took over. The program was the longest continuously-running national literary radio series, having broadcast more than 1,200 episodes. The show aired on 40 to 50 stations a week across the country and locally on KCUR 89.3. The broadcasts are stored in the Public Radio Satellite Systems Content Depot. The show was also heard internationally and was available as a podcast. It was distributed by PRX.

Citing its budget crisis, the University of Missouri discontinued funding for New Letters on the Air and BkMk Press in 2020. It also incorporated New Letters into its English department.

== New Letters Literary Awards ==
The New Letters Literary Awards program was begun in 1986. It consists of prizes for poetry, essays and short stories:

- New Letters Poetry Prize — $1,500 for the best group of three to six poems
- Dorothy Churchill Cappon Essay Prize — $1,500 for the best essay
- Alexander Patterson Cappon Fiction Prize — $1,500 for the best short story

== See also ==
- List of literary magazines
