= Janet Nichols Lynch =

American writer (born 1952)

- Born: Janet Louise Nichols; October 3, 1952 (age 73); Sacramento, California, U.S.
- Education: California State University, Sacramento (BA); Arizona State University (MM); California State University, Fresno (MFA)
- Occupations: Author, educator, pianist
- Spouse: Timothy Lynch
- Children: 2
- Writing career
- Genres: Young adult fiction, historical fiction, nonfiction
- Notable works: Messed Up (2009); Racing California (2012)
- Website: www.janetnicholslynch.com

Janet Nichols Lynch (née Janet Louise Nichols; born October 3, 1952) is an American author of young adult fiction, fiction, and nonfiction. Lynch is also a pianist and an educator in music, English, and history.

== Early life and education ==
Lynch was born in Sacramento, California, and raised in the nearby suburb of Carmichael. Her father, William R. Nichols, was a refrigeration engineer and her mother, Lena D. Graifemberg Nichols, was a homemaker. She has an older sister, Joyce, born in 1950. In 1974, Lynch graduated with a B.A. in music from California State University, Sacramento. She continued her musical study to earn a Master of Music in Piano Performance and Pedagogy from Arizona State University in 1976. In 2002, she earned an M.F.A. in creative writing from California State University, Fresno, where she studied fiction writing with Steve Yarbrough and David Borofka and creative nonfiction with John Hales.

== Writing career ==
Lynch's first published works were in cycling journalism and appeared in Competitive Cycling, Bike World, Bicycling, Women Sports, and similar publications, 1977–1980.

After turning to fiction writing, Lynch's first published short story appeared in The New Yorker in 1984. Her fiction also has been published in Seventeen, The San Joaquin Review, The Baltimore Review, Confrontation, Writers' Forum, Highway 99: a Literary Journey through California’s Great Central Valley, Tribute to Orpheus 2, and elsewhere. For the past sixteen years, she has read her short fiction on Valley Public Radio's Valley Writers Read, hosted by Franz Weinschenk.

Lynch is most known for her young adult novels, which are written in the genres of historical and realistic fiction and often set in California.

== Awards ==
Lynch's young adult novel Messed Up, about a Mexican-American teen secretly living on his own in a small town of California's San Joaquin Valley, was awarded a 2009 ALA Quick Pick for Reluctant Readers and a VOYA Top of the Top Shelf Fiction for Middle School Readers. Her novel Racing California, set at the AMGEN Tour of California professional bicycle race, was named a Society of School Librarians International 2012 Honor Book. Her short story collection Where Words Leave Off Music Begins won the 2003 Outstanding Thesis Award for the College of Arts and Humanities at Fresno State University.

== Teaching career ==
At the age of 18, Lynch began teaching private piano. She was an adjunct music instructor at De Anza College, Cupertino, 1980–1990, and at Skyline College, San Bruno, 1981–1990. She taught music and English at College of the Sequoias, Visalia, 1997–2009.

Employed by Visalia Unified School District from 1999 to 2014, Lynch taught English and history at the middle school and high school levels. She was the director of the Tulare County Office of Education Teen Fiction Writers’ Workshop in spring, 2015.

== Personal life ==
Lynch lives in Visalia, California, with her husband, composer Timothy Lynch, and they have two grown children. Lynch is an avid cyclist; she has raced bicycles and cycle-toured in the U.S. and Europe, including a ride from Phoenix, AZ to Washington, D. C. She competes in running races and triathlons.

== Works ==
=== Young Adult and Children's Fiction ===
- Ellen of Allensworth (2025) ASIN B0DX88DVJZ
- Commie Pinko (2017) ASIN B079655CV8 ISBN 978-1532017797
- Wheel of Fire (2016) ISBN 978-1491791059 ASIN B0794XM6S8
- My Beautiful Hippie (2013)ISBN 978-0823426034 ISBN 0823426033
- Racing California (2012) ISBN 0823423638, 978-0823423637
- Addicted to Her (2010) ISBN 0823421864, 978-0823421862
- Messed Up (2009) ISBN 0823421856, 978-0823421855
- Peace is a Four Letter Word (2005)ISBN 1442004711, 9781442004719
- Casey Wooster's Pet Care Service (middle grade, 1993) ISBN 0689318790, 978-0689318795

=== Fiction ===
- More to Life (novel, 2025)
- Chest Pains (novel, 2009)
- Where Words Leave off Music Begins (stories, 2004)

=== Nonfiction ===
- Elizabeth Warren: What It Takes to Run for President (2022)
- Florence Price, American Composer (2022)
- Clara Schuman, Pianist and Composer (2021)
- Women Music Makers (1992)
- American Music Makers (1990)
