= C.E. Poverman =

American fiction writer

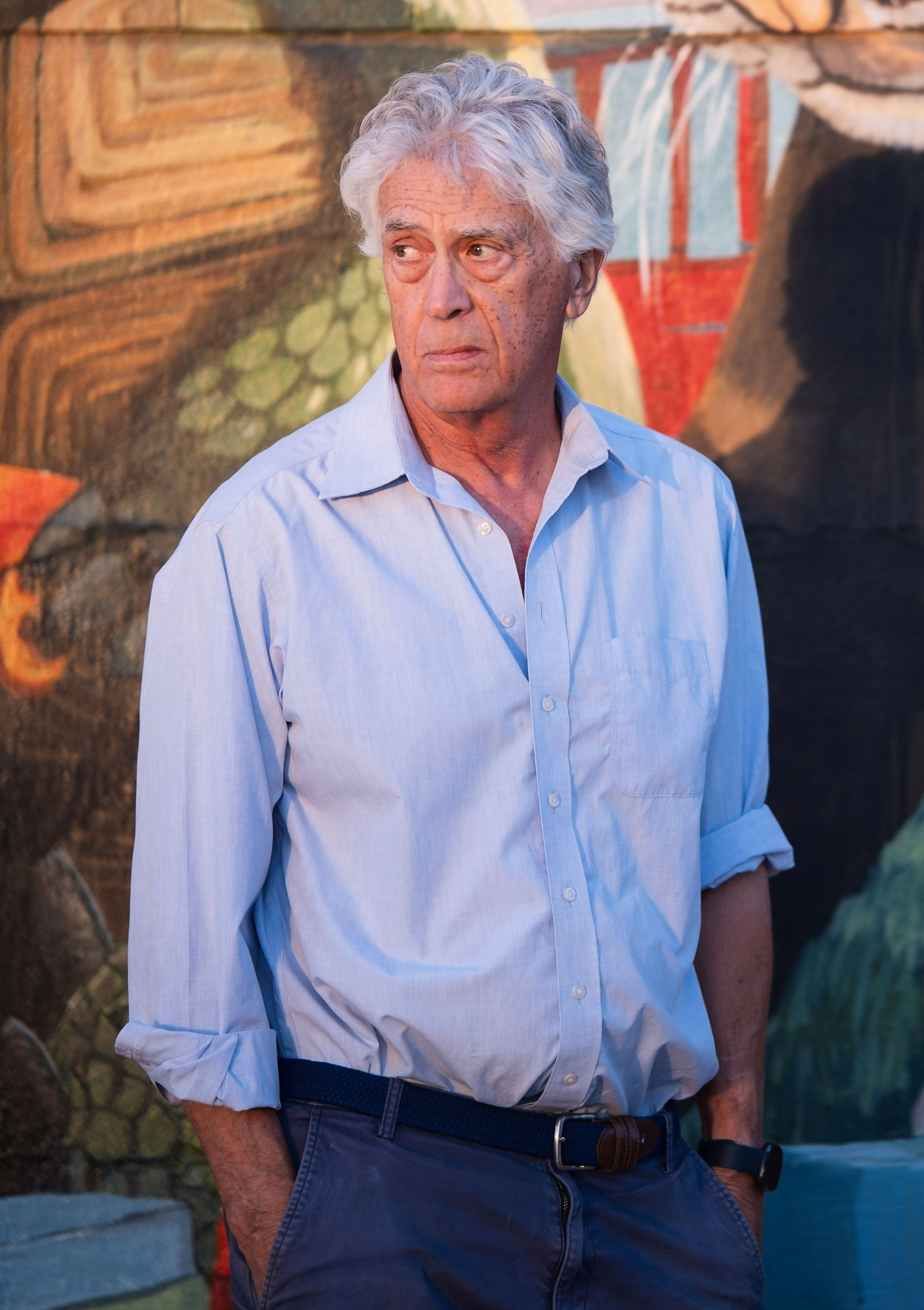
C.E. Poverman in 2025

Charles Everit Poverman (born in New Haven, Connecticut) is an American fiction writer.

== Life and work ==
Poverman is the son of A. David Poverman, a surgeon and Helen Goldberg Poverman. He had an older sister, Judith, who died in 1995.

On Labor Day 1955, at age eleven, Poverman contracted polio during the last major epidemic before Jonas Salk’s polio vaccine was released. He was the only child in the ward who neither died nor was permanently paralyzed. Poverman cites this incident as a watershed in his own life and in his understanding of family dynamics.

Poverman attended Hopkins Grammar School, a private school in New Haven, where he swam competitively and graduated in 1962. Poverman then entered Yale and studied writing under Robert Penn Warren. He was a Senior Scholar of the House and president of his senior society, Elihu. He graduated with “High Honors with Exceptional Distinction” in 1966.

Following graduation, Poverman went to India on a Fulbright teaching fellowship. After nine months of teaching and a short stint as a famine relief worker in India, he lived briefly in Thailand before returning to the United States. In 1969, he earned an M.F.A. with honors from the University of Iowa Writing Program.

His first collection of stories, The Black Velvet Girl, won the Iowa School of Letters Short Fiction Award in 1976. Competition judge Donald Barthelme wrote: “Poverman takes us to new places, new cities of the imagination. He is adept, surprising, sometimes harsh, and frequently very funny—a real discovery.

In 1977, he took a position at the University of Arizona at Tucson and published his first novel, Susan, with Viking. In 1980, he published his second novel, Solomon's Daughter, also with Viking. That same year he married the photographer Linda Fry. Their son, Dana, was born in 1983 and their daughter, Marisa, in 1987. In 1986, he published his third novel My Father in Dreams.

Poverman’s second story collection, Skin was published in 1992. In the Winter 1992 issue of The Georgia Review, Greg Johnson wrote that Skin “powerfully dramatizes the stress and confusion of people who try, quixotically and sometimes nobly, to get inside the skin of another person, while a review from PBS Books & Company stated "the stories all hit the mark with their depictions of characters who are devious, gullible, confused, quirky and even insane, but never unreal."

In August 2013, Poverman published his seventh book, Love by Drowning. A starred review in Library Journal called it "an acutely intelligent psychological thriller that will keep readers as off-balance as his protagonist."

In 2019, Poverman's novel, Love by Drowning, was made into a movie with Dow Jazz Films. Poverman wrote the adapted screenplay for the movie.

== Works ==
- The Black Velvet Girl (Iowa City: University of Iowa Press, 1976)
- Susan (New York; Viking, 1977)
- Solomon’s Daughter (New York: Viking, 1981)
- My Father in Dreams (New York: Scribners, 1988)
- Skin: Stories (Princeton: Ontario Review Press, 1992)
- On the Edge (Princeton: Ontario Review Press, 1997)
- Love by Drowning (Berkeley, California: El León Literary Arts, 2013)

== Published Stories ==
- Landlocked (Santa Monica Review. Spring 1995. Volume 7, Number 2.)
- Deer Season (The Ontario Review. Spring/Summer 1996. Number 44.)
- Washington Crossing the Delaware (Gettysburg Review. Winter 1997. Volume 10, No. 4.)
- Half Wives (The Colorado Review. 47.1. Spring 2020.)
- Before the N Word (The North American Review. Spring 2022. Volume 307. Number 1.)

== Awards ==
- 1976, Iowa Short Fiction Award: The Black Velvet Girl
