= There Goes a... =

US television program

- Also known as: Real Wheels; Live Action Video for Kids; Dream Big
- Genre: Children's, Educational
- Created by: Dave Hood
- Written by: Dave Hood
- Directed by: Dave Hood; Ken Urman
- Starring: Dave Hood (20 episodes); Becky Borg (12 episodes); David Sidoni (3 episodes)
- Country of origin: United States
- Original language: English
- No. of seasons: 1
- No. of episodes: 23

Production
- Executive producer: Dave Hood
- Producers: Dave Hood; Brian Levine; Ken Urman
- Editor: Dave Hood
- Running time: 30 minutes
- Production companies: Dave Hood Entertainment; Power to Create, Inc.

Original release
- Network: Direct-to-video
- Release: 1993 – 2003

Real Wheels, also known as There Goes a..., Live Action Video for Kids, and Dream Big, is a live-action series of children's educational videos for ages 3–8. The subject of each episode is a specific vehicle and the different jobs it does, along with real people who do jobs requiring the vehicle. Episodes are hosted by Dave Hood, usually with Becky Borg as a co-host. Dave Sidoni also hosted 3 episodes.

Real Wheels aired in broadcast syndication (alternating with KidVision series, 'A Day With') during the 1996–97 television season, under the umbrella title Dream Big, distributed by Litton Syndications. The series was syndicated to public television stations by American Public Television from 2003 to 2010.

== Premise ==
At the beginning of each episode, Dave and (usually) Becky introduce themselves to the audience as their job titles. They say they are not real workers but have been given permission to pretend for a day, so that the hosts and the audience can learn about the episode's subject vehicles and jobs.

In a typical episode, Dave and Becky talk about how the vehicles work, their purposes, their history, and talk to people who work in their fields. Comedic segments are also shown in a typical episode, such as antics between Dave and Becky, Dave making a mistake and saying his catchphrase, "I shouldn't have done that!", and Dave and Becky getting into trouble.

At the end of each episode, Dave and Becky persuade the audience to visit their local library, or the place based on the subject vehicles' episode to learn more about them. Sometimes, Dave and Becky, or someone who works in the subject vehicles' fields discuss safety or words of advice with the audience.

== Locations ==
The majority of the episodes were filmed on location in Southern California at locations such as Union Station, Ontario International Airport, the Los Angeles County Sheriff's Department, Six Flags Magic Mountain, the Metro Headquarters Building, the Getty Museum and Camp Pendleton. They were occasionally filmed at places like the Kennedy Space Center, the Pacific Southwest Railway Museum, and the USS Kitty Hawk.

== List of episodes ==
| No. | Title | Original release date |
|---|---|---|
| 1 | "There Goes a Fire Truck" | 1993 |
Firefighter Dave takes a visit to the Ontario, California Fire Department to see what it takes to be a real firefighter and how fire trucks work. It also features footage of the Ontario International Airport Fire Department in action. Viewers are also shown the inside of a fire truck and learn about all of the different equipment and gear the firefighters use. Note: This is the series premiere.
| 2 | "There Goes a Bulldozer" | March 2, 1994 |
Construction Foreman Dave visits demolition and construction sites to learn all about machines used in many types of construction.
| 3 | "There Goes an Airplane" | July 27, 1994 |
Pilot Dave learns all about different types of airplanes and how they work. Some footage shows the US Navy aircraft in action. Note: The episode has been called There Goes a Plane on Travel Adventures DVD case. This episode was even originally titled as There Goes a Jet Plane.
| 4 | "There Goes a Train" | July 27, 1994 |
Engineer Dave learns all about the different types of trains by visiting places such as Los Angeles Union Station and the Pacific Southwest Railway Museum. Note: This episode was originally titled There Goes a Locomotive.
| 5 | "There Goes a Police Car" | July 27, 1994 |
Deputies Dave and Becky learn all about police work as well as the equipment and vehicles they use. Most of the footage shows the Los Angeles Sheriff's Department in action. Viewers are also shown different police equipment, gear and vehicles to see what they look like. Note: This episode marks Becky Borg's first appearance in the series.
| 6 | "There Goes a Truck" | July 27, 1994 |
Truck Drivers Dave and Becky learn about all different types of trucks and how they work.
| 7 | "There Goes a Boat" | January 18, 1995 |
Captains Dave and Becky learn about different types of boats and ships and how they work. Note: The episode was originally titled There Goes a Ship and There Goes a Big Ship, but was soon re-titled as bigger ships were not only shown in the episode.
| 8 | "There Goes a Spaceship" | January 18, 1995 |
Astronauts Dave and Becky visit the Kennedy Space Center to learn about outer space and different types of spacecraft.
| 9 | "There Goes a Race Car" | January 18, 1995 |
Race Car Drivers Dave and Becky learn all about different types of race cars, including off-road racing, stock-car racing at a NASCAR race in Tucson Raceway, Top Fuel Dragsters, and visit Sears Point Raceway to visit the Skip Barber Racing School.
| 10 | "Here Comes a Roller Coaster and Other Fun-Filled Rides" | May 16, 1995 |
Dave has a dream that he spends a day at Six Flags Magic Mountain and rides on all different types of roller coasters and other thrill rides, with help by his son, Taylor, who helps Dave find “the kid in him”. Note: This episode was not broadcast in syndication.
| 11 | "There Goes a Monster Truck" | May 16, 1995 |
Monster Truck Drivers Dave and Becky learn all about monster trucks, and learn how to drive one.
| 12 | "There Goes a Motorcycle" | May 16, 1995 |
Bikers Dave and Becky learn all about motorcycles and how they are used when driving for recreation and racing.
| 13 | "There Goes a Helicopter" | May 16, 1995 |
Helicopter Pilots Dave and Becky learn all about different types of helicopters and how they work.
| 14 | "There Goes Santa Claus" | September 12, 1995 |
Dave and Becky pretend to be Santa Claus and do the duties that he does. Note: This episode is a flashback episode when Dave and Becky remember what they did in the past. It features flashbacks from There Goes a Police Car, There Goes a Boat, There Goes a Monster Truck, and There Goes a Motorcycle.
| 15 | "There Goes a Mail Truck" | 1996 |
Letter Carriers Dave and Becky learn about where the mail goes and how it is transported. Note: The episode is also titled as There Goes The Mail. A VHS reissue was released on June 16, 1999
| 16 | "There Goes a Rescue Vehicle" | April 15, 1997 |
Paramedics Dave and Becky learn about different types of rescue workers and the vehicles they use. Viewers are shown some of the equipment medical responders use. Dave and Becky also work with a rescue dog named Buddy.
| 17 | "There Goes a Garbage Truck" | January 27, 1998 |
Garbage Collectors Dave and Becky learn about garbage trucks and how important it is to keep the Earth clean and not pollute, and about where the garbage goes and where it is stored. Note: This episode marks Becky Borg's final appearance in the series. The episode also features a flashback from There Goes a Truck.
| 18 | "There Goes a Dump Truck" | June 15, 1999 |
Dump Truck Driver Dave learns all about dump trucks and other construction vehicles in road work, and what it takes being a construction foreman. Note: David Sidoni hosts this episode.
| 19 | "There Goes a Tractor" | January 30, 2001 |
Farmer Dave learns about tractors and equipment used in farm work. Note: David Sidoni hosts this episode. The original title for this episode was There Goes a Farm Tractor.
| 20 | "There Goes a Farm Truck" | January 30, 2001 |
Following up with the previous episode, Dave learns all about farm trucks and how they work, and learns more about harvesting and the packaging of fruits and vegetables, with different kinds of harvesting equipment. Note: David Sidoni hosts this episode. This episode also marks his final appearance.
| 21 | "There Goes a Bus" | May 30, 2002 |
Bus Driver Dave learns about buses and attends bus driver school to know what it takes to become one. Note: Dave Hood returns in this episode.
| 22 | "There Goes a Tank" | September 16, 2003 |
Tank Driver Dave goes to Camp Pendleton and learns all about tanks and other military vehicles and how they work.
| 23 | "There Goes a Rescue Hero" | September 16, 2003 |
Rescue Hero Dave learns about rescue workers and the vehicles and equipment they use in emergency situations. He also brings along his real pet dog named Charlie, where he attempts to train him how to rescue people in distress. Note: This is the series finale.

== Spin-offs ==
=== Rockin' Real Wheels ===
A spin-off known as Rockin' Real Wheels was also released featuring songs about the specific types of vehicles featured in the main series. There are four episodes in this series.

| No. | Title | Original release date |
|---|---|---|
| 1 | "Train Songs" | September 12, 1995 |
Two kids named Michael and Jennifer visit the Pacific Southwest Railway Museum to learn all about trains. Along the way, they meet Tuffy the train in a musical train adventure.
| 2 | "Bulldozer Songs" | September 12, 1995 |
Two kids named Winnie and Alex meet Rocky the bulldozer as he takes them to learn all about bulldozers and other construction vehicles and how they work through song.
| 3 | "Fire Truck Songs" | September 12, 1995 |
During an open house at the fire department, two kids named Jessica and Jay meet Freddy the Friendly Fire Engine as they embark on a musical journey learning all about fire trucks. Along the way, the kids learn about the various types of tools and equipment the firefighters use as well as various fire safety guidelines. Various songs are used to entertain the kids.
| 4 | "Santa Songs" | September 12, 1995 |
One day, at the library, three kids named Leslie, Leon (then-future All That star Leon Frierson), and Julie open a magical Christmas book and an animated Santa Claus takes them on a musical holiday journey to the North Pole.

=== That's How They Do It ===
The first two episodes were originally released as part of the Thinking Kids series, and were re-released on DVD in 2002.

| No. | Title | Original release date |
|---|---|---|
| 1 | "Making Candy" "Chocolate" | September 12, 1995 |
Dave as Professor Hoody visits a chocolate factory to see how sugar and cocoa beans become candy bars and chocolate chips.
| 2 | "Making Money" "Money" | September 12, 1995 |
Dave as Professor Hoody visits Washington, D.C. to learn how dollar bills are printed. He also travels to the Denver Mint to learn how coins are made.
| 3 | "Dolls" | 2004 (syndication) |
Dave as Professor Hoody visits a doll museum to learn about dolls and how they are made. Hoody gets to create his own doll with a little help from friends.

== Other media ==
=== DVD releases ===
The Real Wheels series has also released a series of DVD, each usually containing three episodes as well as a blooper reel, interactive glossary, and other special features. The DVDs are usually titled as "Adventures", with three episodes sharing a theme among their featured vehicles. The "Rockin' Real Wheels" spin-off was also re-released on DVD, excluding Santa Songs. All of the episodes from the original series, excluding Here Comes a Roller Coaster and There Goes Santa Claus, were re-released on DVD.

| Title | Episodes featured |
|---|---|
| Truck Adventures | There Goes a Fire Truck, There Goes a Garbage Truck, There Goes a Truck |
| Mega Truck Adventures | There Goes a Bulldozer, There Goes a Monster Truck, There Goes a Tank |
| High Speed Adventures | There Goes a Race Car, There Goes a Motorcycle, There Goes a Spaceship |
| Travel Adventures | There Goes a Train, There Goes a Plane, There Goes a Bus |
| Land, Sea, and Air Adventures | There Goes a Boat, There Goes the Mail, There Goes a Helicopter |
| Tractor Adventures | There Goes a Tractor, There Goes a Dump Truck, There Goes a Farm Truck |
| Rescue Adventures | There Goes a Rescue Hero, There Goes a Police Car, There Goes a Rescue Vehicle |
| Rockin' Real Wheels | Train Songs, Bulldozer Songs, Fire Truck Songs |

=== Live tour ===
From 2001-2004, there was a live tour entitled, "Real Wheels Live". It starred Dave Hood that featured him doing magic tricks and had audience participation stunts. Before the show, there were vehicles that the audience would touch and look at.
