= Elizabeth Searle =

Fiction writer

- Searle at Boston Book Festival in 2026
- Born: Penn Wynne, Pennsylvania, U.S.
- Education: Oberlin College (BA); Brown University
- Occupations: Novelist, short story, scriptwriter
- Writing career
- Period: 1982-present
- Genres: Literary fiction, erotic literature, theater

Elizabeth Searle is an American fiction writer, playwright and screenwriter. She is the author of seven books of fiction and a rock opera, and she is co-writer of "I'll Show You Mine," a feature film from Duplass Brothers Productions and that was released by Gravitas Ventures in 2023 in select theaters in NYC, LA and more and widely via VOD on AmazonPrime, AppleTV, Peacock and more. The film which Elizabeth co-wrote with David Shields and Tiffany Louquet, is directed by Megan Griffiths and stars Poorna Jagannathan and Casey Thomas Brown. It received positive reviews in the New York Times and more, and national media coverage in VARIETY and more. Both I'LL SHOW YOU MINE and Searle's theater work, TONYA & NANCY: THE ROCK OPERA, have drawn major media attention.

Searle's novel "A Four-Sided Bed" is currently being developed as a feature film. A short film based on the novel, 'Four-Sided,' screened 2019-2025 in festivals in Cannes, Boston, Chicago, Madrid, Paris, Tokyo and more. Her most recent books are 'Lock Her Up' (Pierian Springs Press) which is released in 2026, and The Drama Room (Pierian Springs Press) which was a Finalist for the Kirkus Indie Book award in literary fiction (2025).

She is the playwright for 'Tonya & Nancy: the Rock Opera' (music by Michael Teoli) which most recently was produced in March 2026 by Dogged Utopia Productions and in February 2020 in an award-winning TheatreZone production starring Broadway great Andrea McArdle (the original ANNIE). It was produced in NYC as a sold-out Full Production show at the New York Musical Festival (NYMF). Paul Boghosian/Harborside Films has produced the show multiple times. The 2020 production won four Broadway World Regional Theater awards. A Tonya & Nancy concert at 54Below, featuring Broadway performers, was recorded as a CD from Broadway Records and produced as a concert film, available in 2021 on streamingmusicals.com.

Searle's novel 'Girl Held in Home' was selected for New Rivers Press American Fiction Series. 'We Got Him' was a finalist for the Midwest Book Award and was released in AudioBook in 2018. 'A Four Sided Bed' was nominated for an ALA award and various Editor's Choice awards. Her short story collection My Body to You won the Iowa Short Fiction Prize (James Salter, judge) and Celebrities in Disgracewas a finalist for the Paterson Fiction Prize. 'Celebrities in Disgrace' was produced as a short film that screened at various festivals. Searle's one act play, 'Stolen Girl Song' was produced at the Act One One Act Play festival in NY in 2019. Searle wrote the libretto for Tonya and Nancy:The Opera, produced multiple times. Searle's theater works and the Feature Film I'LL SHOW YOU MINE have drawn both national and international media.

== Early life ==
Searle was born in Penn Wynne, Pennsylvania. Her father Bill was a Democratic Party activist and worked at GE and other companies; Barbara, her mother, was a public school teacher and children's librarian. She has a younger sister, Kate, who works at MIT and Bill, her older brother, is a videographer. Her family moved during her childhood from PA to SC to KY to AZ.

== Education ==
Searle received a B.A. from Oberlin College and her Master's degree from Brown University. She was a special education teacher and taught students with autism in schools located in New Haven, Connecticut and Providence, Rhode Island.

== Career ==
In 1982, Searle's short story, "Missing LaDonna", appeared in Redbook. This was followed by stories placed in the South Carolina Review, the Indiana Review, The Greensboro Review, the Kenyon Review, Ploughshares and other journals. In 1993 her first book, My Body To You, was published. In 1992, it had been named winner of the Iowa Short Fiction Award by the Iowa Writers' Workshop. James Salter, a novelist and screenwriter, who wrote The Hunters, Downhill Racer, The Appointment and others, acted as judge.

A Four Sided Bed, Searle's first novel, was published by Graywolf Press in 1998 and received positive reviews from Kirkus Reviews and Booklist. Her novel A Four-Sided Bed was nominated for an ALA book award and was sited as an Editor's Choice by Booklist, Amazon and more. The book is now being developed as a Feature Film. "We Got Him" was published by New Rivers Press in 2016 and was released in AudioBook in 2018 by BlunderWoman Productions. "Girl Held in Home" was also published by New Rivers Press, selected for the American Fiction Series.

A novella and collection of short stories entitled Celebrities in Disgrace was published in 2001. When discussing one of the themes of this collection during an interview with Post Road Magazine, Searle said, "I had a phrase in my mind, 'the witch of ambition,' and I do think there is this sort of dark force inside of people and any of those dark forces are hard to write about but they're the ones you want to write about...." Ambition and the search for attention seem to be the "...driving forces of our time."

"Celebrities in Disgrace," the title novella, was called a 'miniature masterpiece' by New York Times Book Review. Celebrities in Disgrace was produced as a short film in 2010 by Bravo Sierra Pictures, with a script co-written by Elizabeth Searle. The film premiered as an official selection at Woods Hole International Film Festival on Cape Cod and has screened at other festivals throughout the country. Searle's novel A Four-Sided Bed was also the basis of an award-winning short film that screened widely at over 20 festivals, Four-Sided (2019-2024)

Tonya and Nancy: The Rock Opera was most recently produced in North Carolina by Dogged Utopia Productions and in 2020 by TheatreZone in a production starring Broadway's Andrea McArdle (ANNIE) and reviewed as a 'joyous theater package.' The show was produced as a concert event at Lucille Lortel Theater in NYC in 2019 and was recorded in concert at 54Below in Feb 2018. The 54Below concert CD was reviewed as 'stunningly awesome.' The concert is available on film (2021). The rock opera premiered in 2008 in Portland, OR, produced by Triangle Productions. It featured libretto by Searle and music by Michael Teoli. The show was based on Searle and Abigail Al Doory Cross's Tonya & Nancy: the Opera, libretto and concept by Elizabeth Searle; Searle adapted it for the Portland production with director Don Horn. The rock opera reviewed as "brilliant and touching" in Portland Mercury and received wide media. Tonya & Nancy: the Rock Opera premiered with a new Book by Searle in 2011, produced by Harborside Films at the American Repertory Theater's Oberon Theater. Boston reviews included: "Black Swan on Ice" (The Boston Herald); "Absurdly funny; surprisingly poignant moments amidst the comedy and a rousing soundtrack" (The Boston Phoenix); "Brilliant; amazing music; one of the most exciting spectacles I have ever seen' (Steve Almond; WGBH Boston).

The show premiered in Hollywood at the King King Club, as a benefit for the LA theater Celebration. The show had a sold-out run at New York Musical Theater Festival (NYMF). It was fully produced by Underscore Theater in Chicago for a 6 week run. It was named one of the Top Five Musicals of the Year by New City Stages and was a Jeff Award 'recommended' show. The award-winning 2020 production at TheatreZone featured Broadway icon Andrea McArdle. A concert film is on streamingmusicals.com.

Searle also writes nonfiction. Her essays have appeared in over a dozen anthologies. She has co-edited an anthology on Soap Operas from McFarland Books (2017) and co-edited an anthology with McFarland in 2018 on Teen Idols called IDOL TALK. Her essay "Knitted Goods: Notes from a Nervous Non-Knitter" appeared in the anthology Knitting Yarns: Writers on Knitting, published by W. W. Norton & Company in 2013.

Searle has recently focused on screenwriting. Searle co-wrote with Tiffany Louquet and David Shields the feature film 'I'll Show You Mine' which is directed by Megan Giffiths and stars Poorna Jagannathan (Never Have I Ever) and Casey Thomas Brown (The Kominsky Method) and is a Duplass Brothers Production released by Gravitas Ventures in 2023 in select theaters and on home screens via VOD. The film was praised in the New York Times (see review link below) and CapTimes ("Two nervy lead performances and a very well written script") as well as INTO ("a triumph").

Searle's novel A Four-Sided Bed is being developed as a feature film by Creatrix Films and by producer David Ball. Her script for A Four-Sided Bed has won recognition at over 20 festivals and award competitions in 2019-2025 including Best Feature Screenplay at the Massachusetts Independent Film Festival. It was produced as a staged reading at Zephyr Theater in LA in 2016, starring Evan Ross (The Hunger Games) and Gia Mantegna (Under the Dome). It was also performed as a Staged Reading in 2019 at ReelHeArt International Film Festival in Toronto. Her thriller script LOCK HER UP has won awards in several contests and is now a novel.

Searle has taught creative writing at Brown University, Emerson College, the University of Southern Maine's Program in Creative Writing, the University of Massachusetts Boston and other institutions. She has taught at Stonecoast MFA since the program began in 2002. Searle was a longtime member, Board officer and committee chairperson of the New England chapter of International PEN. In 2020, she was one of six writers who formed the group Writers Against Racial Injustice which raised over $60,000 for the Equal Justice Initiative. The group was featured in the Boston Globe and Publishers Weekly. She is a member of Women in Film and Video and a board member of Writers for Democratic Action- MA. Searle is married to software engineer John Hodgkinson; they have a son, Will and reside in Arlington, Massachusetts.

== Bibliography ==
=== Novels ===
- Lock Her Up (2026) ISBN 978-1965784594
- We Got Him (2016) ISBN 978-0-89823-348-3
- A Four-Sided Bed (1998) ISBN 978-0983677482
- Girl Held in Home (2011) ISBN 978-0898232585

=== Story collections ===
- My Body To You (1993) ISBN 9780-877453871
- Celebrities in Disgrace (2001) ISBN 978-1555973247
- The Drama Room: A Collection in Three Acts | ISBN 978-1965784310 | Pierian Springs Press, 2025

=== As contributor or editor ===
- Unbound: Composing Home; anthology including Elizabeth's essay 'Moving Map'; New Rivers Press, 2022
- Idol Talk: Women Writers on the Teenage Infatuations that Changed Their Lives; co-editor with Tamra Wilson of anthology and contributor of essay; published by McFarland Books, 2018
- Soap Opera Confidential: Women Writers on Why We Tune in Tomorrow as the World Turns Restlessly by the Guiding Light of our Lives; co-editor with Suzanne Strempek Shea; published by McFarland Books, 2017
- "Act Tresses: Hair as Performance Art"; Me, My Hair and I; anthology edited by Elizabeth Benedict; published by Algonquin Books, 2016
- "Knitted Goods: Notes from a Nervous Non-Knitter"; Knitting Yarns: Writers on Knitting. W. W. Norton & Company (2013)
- "Men Undressed: Women Writers and the Male Sexual Experience"; Dzanc Books, 2011
- "No Near Exit: Best of Post Road Magazine"; Dzanc Books, 2011
- Don't You Forget About Me: Contemporary Writers on the Films of John Hughes (2007)
- The Darfur Anthology (2007)
- Now Write!:Fiction Writing Exercises from Today's Best Writers and Teachers (2006)
- Out of the Blue Writers Unite (2004)
- The Iowa Award: The Best Stories, 1991-2000 (2001)
- American Fiction, Volume Seven: The Best Unpublished Short Stories by Emerging Writers (1995)
- Breaking Up Is Hard to Do: Stories by Women (1994)
- The Time of Our Lives: Women Write on Sex After 40 (1993)
