= Nancy Reisman =

American author

Nancy Reisman (born 1961) is an American author. She teaches creative writing at Vanderbilt University.

== Biography ==
Reisman received her M.F.A. from the MFA Program for Poets & Writers at the University of Massachusetts Amherst and her B.A. from Tufts University.

Her stories have been included anthologies including Best American Short Stories, O. Henry Award Stories, and Jewish in America, High 5ive: An Anthology of Fiction From Ten Years of Five Points, Bestial Noise: A Tin House Reader Her work has also appeared in The Yale Review, The Kenyon Review, Tin House, New England Review, Five Points, Michigan Quarterly Review, SubTropics, Narrative, Glimmer Train, and other journals.

== Awards ==
Her short story collection House Fires won the 1999 Iowa Short Fiction Award. Her novel The First Desire won the Samuel Goldberg & Sons Foundation Prize for Jewish Fiction. Reisman has also received fellowships from the National Endowment for the Arts, the Wisconsin Institute for Creative Writing, and the Fine Arts Work Center in Provincetown, Massachusetts. Reisman won an O. Henry Award and the Raymond Carver Short Story Award. Her book, The First Desire, was also named a New York Times Notable Book of the Year. She was a 2007 James Merrill House Fellow in Stonington, CT.

== Selected works ==
- House Fires (Iowa Short Fiction Award, University of Iowa Press)
- The First Desire (Pantheon)
- Trompe L'Oeil (Tin House Books, May 2015)
