= My Dead Friend Zoe =

2024 film by Kyle Hausmann-Stokes

- Theatrical release poster
- Directed by: Kyle Hausmann-Stokes
- Screenplay by: Kyle Hausmann-Stokes; A. J. Bermudez
- Story by: Kyle Hausmann-Stokes; Cherish Chen
- Produced by: Paul Scanlan; Kyle Hausmann-Stokes; Terri Lubaroff; Ray Maiello; Mike Field; Richard Silverman; Robert Paschall Jr.
- Starring: Sonequa Martin-Green; Natalie Morales; Gloria Reuben; Utkarsh Ambudkar; Morgan Freeman; Ed Harris
- Cinematography: Matt Sakatani Roe
- Edited by: Ali Greer
- Music by: Dan Romer
- Production companies: Legion M Entertainment; Radiant Media Studios
- Distributed by: Briarcliff Entertainment
- Release dates: March 9, 2024 (SXSW); February 28, 2025 (United States)
- Running time: 102 minutes
- Country: United States
- Language: English
- Box office: $1.3 million

My Dead Friend Zoe is a 2024 American comedy-drama film written by Kyle Hausmann-Stokes and A. J. Bermudez, directed by Hausmann-Stokes and starring Sonequa Martin-Green, Natalie Morales, Gloria Reuben, Utkarsh Ambudkar, Morgan Freeman, and Ed Harris.

It premiered at South by Southwest on March 9, 2024 (winning the Audience Award), and was theatrically released in the United States on February 28, 2025.

== Premise ==
My Dead Friend Zoe is a dark comedy drama that follows the journey of Merit, a U.S. Army Afghanistan veteran who is at odds with her family thanks to the presence of Zoe, her dead best friend from the Army.

Due to the persistence of her VA group counselor, her relationship with her mother, and an unserious attitude to a new love interest, Merit's dysfunctional yet supportive friendship with Zoe protects the duo. This is uprooted when Merit's estranged grandfather, who resides at the family's ancestral lake house, loses his way and refuses help.

At its core, this story is about a complicated friendship, a divided family, and the complex ways in which we process grief.

== Cast ==
- Sonequa Martin-Green as Merit
- Natalie Morales as Zoe
- Ed Harris as Dale
- Morgan Freeman as Dr. Cole
- Gloria Reuben as Kris
- Utkarsh Ambudkar as Alex
- Thom Tran as Rufus
- Barbara Lusch as Conductor

== Production ==
Kyle Hausmann-Stokes directed the film in his feature debut. Written by Hausmann-Stokes, A. J. Bermudez and Cherish Chen, the story was inspired by Hausmann-Stokes' time serving five years in Iraq as a paratrooper and convoy commander. Hausmann-Stokes also wrote and directed the 2022 short film, Merit x Zoe. According to Variety, the film is the first to be financed with green energy tax credits; Ray Maiello produced the film for Radiant Media Studios. Radiant Media Studios brought Kansas City Chiefs tight end Travis Kelce to the project as an executive producer. Legion M co-financed under their crowdfunding model.

In May 2023, it was reported that Ed Harris, Sonequa Martin-Green, and Natalie Morales were cast in the film. In June 2023, it was announced that Morgan Freeman, Gloria Reuben, and Utkarsh Ambudkar joined the cast in main roles. Filming occurred in Portland, Oregon, Forest Grove, Oregon and Molalla, Oregon in 2023. In September 2023, it was announced that filming wrapped. By January 2024, Dan Romer was composing the film's score.

== Release ==
My Dead Friend Zoe premiered at South by Southwest on March 9, 2024, where it won the Audience Award. In June 2024, Briarcliff Entertainment acquired the film. On October 19, it won the Grand Jury prize for Best Feature Narrative at the Woodstock Film Festival. It was theatrically released in the United States on February 28, 2025.

== Reception ==
=== Critical response ===
On the review aggregator website Rotten Tomatoes, 94% of 98 critics' reviews are positive, with an average rating of 7.6/10. The website's consensus reads: "Carrying off painful subject matter with a light touch, My Dead Friend Zoe invites audiences to a healing process that comes with both chuckles and tears." Metacritic, which uses a weighted average, assigned the film a score of 75 out of 100, based on 20 critics, indicating "generally favorable" reviews.

Valerie Complex of Deadline Hollywood called the film "a powerful testament to the resilience of the human spirit." Matt Donato of Collider praised Martin-Green's performance, while Brian Tallerico of RogerEbert.com also commended Harris, describing him as "one of our best living actors" in the supporting cast.

Variety ranked My Dead Friend Zoe as one of the 10 Best Films of 2025.
