= Susy Dorn =

Peruvian teacher, musician

- Born: Susana Gabriela Rodriguez Santander; July 20, 1974 (age 52); Lima, Perú
- Occupations: Singer; musician; songwriter; puppeteer
- Website: www.LetsPlayinSpanish.com

Susy Dorn (born Susana Gabriela Rodriguez Santander, July 20, 1974) is a Peruvian-American teacher, musician, performer, producer, and the creator and founder of the Spanish Immersion Program "Let's Play in Spanish". Her teaching methodology includes theater, puppetry, games, and music that she composes and sings.

== Early life ==
Dorn was born and raised in Lima, Perú. She spent her preschool, elementary and high school years in an American school where she was immersed in the English language from age 3. She comes from a family of teachers. Her mother and father are both educators. Dorn got her Bachelor's Degree in Child Development Education from the Pontifical Catholic University of Peru.

== Founding Let's Play in Spanish ==
Dorn moved to the United States in 1998 and started Spanish classes for 8 children in the house of a friend in downtown San Jose, California. The parent participation classes started growing by word of mouth and soon she found herself driving to different cities such as Palo Alto, Cupertino, Willow Glen and Campbell to teach classes full-time. Soon after that, she established her main Spanish classes at the Campbell Community Center, where people drove all the way from San Francisco to take them. Later on, she hired a qualified team of native Spanish teachers and brought the program to different cities. Today the program is established in Campbell, Santa Cruz, Palo Alto, San Mateo and San Francisco attracting more than 700 children from 10 months to 9 years of age.

Dorn and the "Juguemos" team have performed numerous times all around the San Francisco Bay Area attracting hundreds of young followers and their parents to the concerts. Several performances have been done with benefit purposes for Peruvian street children.

== Discography, movies and books ==
Dorn has composed and produced original materials in CDs, DVDs and books that allow parents to take the lessons home.

- Crazy Adventures with Harry & Susy: Spanish is Fun! – with Dave Hood, DVD (2010)
- Cantemos en Español – CD (2004), DVD (2006) and Book (2006)
- Sal y Pimienta – CD (2005), DVD (2006) and Book (2006)
- Los Bomberos – CD (2005) and Book (2007)
- La Marcha de las Aves – CD (2007) and Book (2007)
- Feliz Navidad – CD (2007)
- Rimas y Más Rimas, Ratón Ramón – CD (2008) and Book (2008)
- El Baile del Mono – CD (2009)
