= Ryan Harty =

American writer

Ryan Harty is an American writer. His first book, Bring Me Your Saddest Arizona, was published in 2003 by University of Iowa Press. He is married to fellow writer Julie Orringer.

== Overview ==
Harty grew up in Arizona and northern California and is a graduate of the University of California, Berkeley and the Iowa Writers' Workshop. He was a Stegner Fellow at Stanford University and the recipient of a Henfield-Transatlantic Review Award.

His stories have appeared in Tin House and The Missouri Review and have been anthologized in The 2003 Pushcart Prize and The Best American Short Stories 2003.

== Literary works ==
- Bring me your saddest Arizona. University of Iowa Press. 2003. ISBN 0-87745-869-3. "ryan harty." This book contains eight short stories:
  - What Can I Tell You about My Brother?
  - Ongchoma
  - Between Tubac and Tumacacori
  - Crossroads
  - Sarah at the Palace
  - Why the Sky Turns Red When the Sun Goes Down
  - Don't Call It Christmas
  - September

He won the John Simmons Short Fiction Award.
