= Cara Blue Adams =

American author

- Born: New Hampshire, U.S.
- Education: University of Arizona (MFA)
- Occupation: Author
- Writing career
- Notable awards: Iowa Short Fiction Award (2021)

Cara Blue Adams is an American author born in New Hampshire, raised in Vermont, and resident in Brooklyn, New York.

She won the Iowa Short Fiction Award in 2021 for her debut collection of short stories, You Never Get It Back. Her short fiction also won The Kenyon Review Short Fiction Prize in 2008 and was first-runner up for the Blue Mesa Review Fiction Prize in 2010. Her work has appeared in many journals, including The Kenyon Review, Narrative Magazine and The Sun. She earned her MFA degree from the University of Arizona. From 2011 to 2013 she served as fiction and non-fiction editor of The Southern Review and is currently an associate professor at Seton Hall University.
