= Renée Manfredi =

American novelist

Renée Manfredi is an American novelist.

Manfredi was co-winner of the 1993 Iowa Short Fiction Award for Where Love Leaves Us.

Born in 1962 in Pittsburgh, Pennsylvania, she earned a BA at the University of Pittsburgh and a MFA at Indiana University, Bloomington.

== Books ==
- Where Love Leaves Us, short stories (Iowa City: University of Iowa Press, 1994).
- Above the Thunder, novel (San Francisco: MacAdam/Cage, 2004).
- Running Away with Frannie, novel (San Francisco: MacAdam/Cage, 2006).
