= Edward Hamlin (fiction writer) =

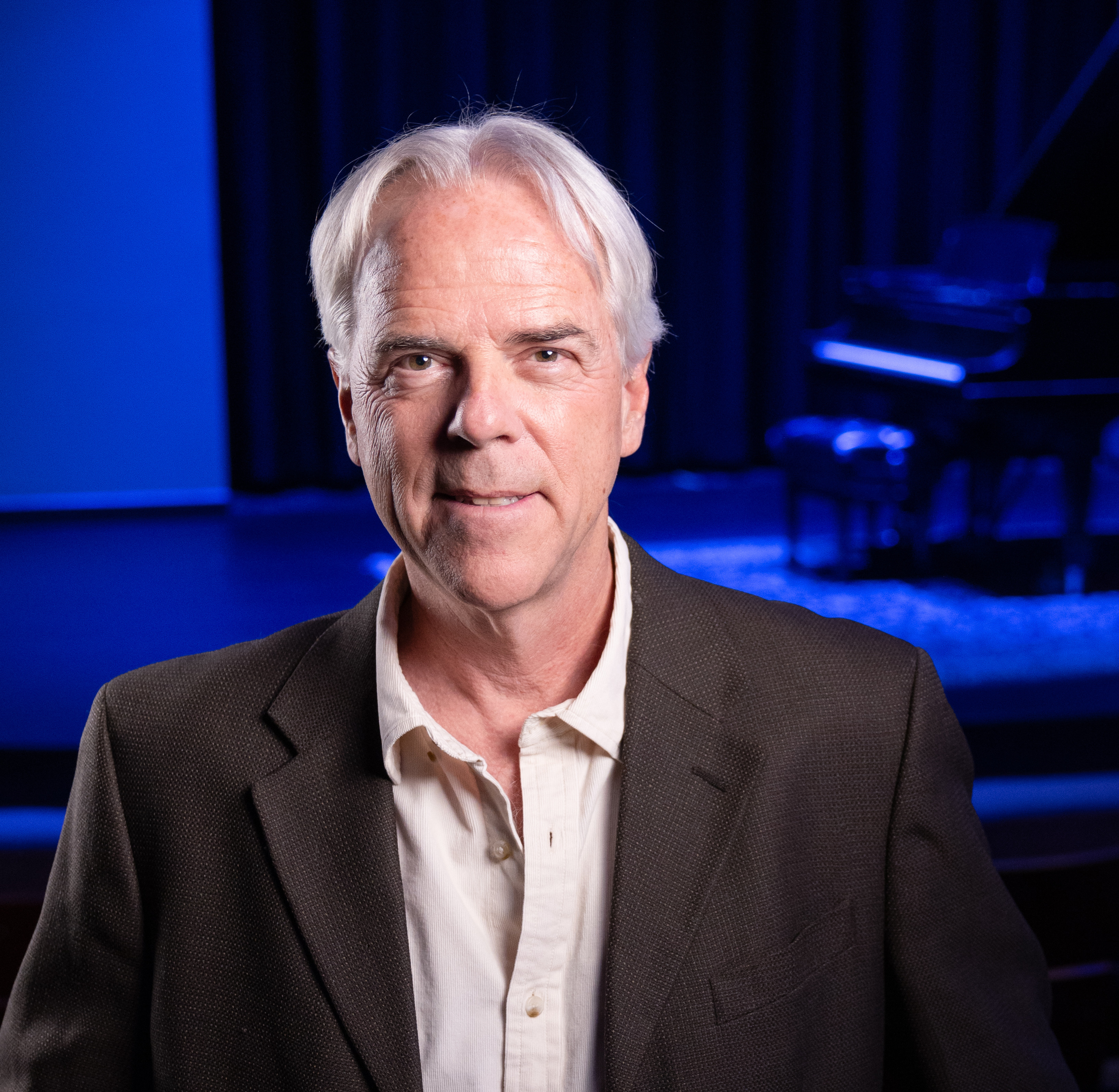
Edward Hamlin (2023).

Edward Hamlin (born 1959) is an American fiction writer and composer of music for acoustic guitar.

== Biography ==
A New York native, Hamlin spent his formative years in Chicago, Illinois and currently resides outside Boulder, Colorado. He received an A.B. with Special Honors from the University of Chicago in 1981 and was inducted into Phi Beta Kappa society in 1980. Hamlin did graduate work toward a PhD in Buddhist Studies at the University of Michigan from 1983 to 1984.

== Writing and recognition ==
Hamlin's work has appeared in numerous literary magazines, including Ploughshares, the Colorado Review, the Bellevue Literary Review, the Missouri Review and Chariton Review. His short story collection, Night in Erg Chebbi and Other Stories (University of Iowa Press 2015, ISBN 978-1609383831), was selected by author Karen Russell as winner of the 2015 Iowa Short Fiction Award and was subsequently published, to positive reviews, by the University of Iowa Press. The collection went on to win the Colorado Book Award for short story collections.

In addition to the Iowa and Colorado awards, Hamlin's work has been recognized with a Nelson Algren Award, a Nelligan Prize and a Top of the Mountain Book Award, and has been a finalist for the Flannery O’Connor Award for Short Fiction, the Narrative Story Contest, the American Fiction Prize, the Mary C. Mohr Editors’ Award, the David Nathan Myerson Fiction Prize and the Jeffrey E. Smith Editors’ Prize. In 2013, his story “The Release” was named runner-up for the Nelson Algren Award. In the United Kingdom, his stories “Indígena” and “After Dreamland” were shortlisted for the Bridport prize in 2014 and 2016 respectively. Two of his stories have been nominated for the Pushcart Prize. The story “Phone Phone Gun” was performed theatrically, in Denver, as part of the 2012–2013 season of Stories on Stage.

Hamlin's debut novel, Sonata in Wax (Green City Books 2024, ISBN 978-196310100-3), was published in April, 2024. The novel is a musical mystery centered on a brilliantly avant-garde piano sonata discovered a century after it was recorded on wax cylinders by an unknown virtuoso. Musically, the sonata is many decades ahead of its time, the unknown composer exploring harmonic and rhythmic concepts that have more in common with mid-century bebop than with the piano music of its era, as exemplified by composers such as Ravel and Satie. The novel uses a braided, dual-timeline structure to uncover the mystery behind the sonata and its nameless composer while pursuing a parallel family origin mystery. The two plot lines intersect when the protagonist of the contemporary story, the renowned classical music producer Ben Weil, stumbles into a lie that threatens to destroy his career and his personal life. Solving the mystery of the strange sonata proves to be the only way Ben can redeem himself.

== Critical response ==
Critical response to Hamlin's work has been positive. Pulitzer Prize finalist Karen Russell called the stories in his debut collection “sweeping and intimate and awesomely confident of their own effects,” while Publishers Weekly described Night in Erg Chebbi and Other Stories as “a memorable read from a writer with considerable talent.” Foreword Reviews described the collection as "beautiful, terrifying and compassionate."

Kirkus Reviews called Sonata in Wax a "deeply realized tale of the power of music and the anonymity of history," adding that "Hamlin’s rich prose is as deft and precise as the skills of his characters, imbuing the descriptions of music with beauty and drama."

== Themes and style ==
Hamlin's writing explores what happens when ordinary people are confronted with choices they never thought they would have to make. His characters are often caught unprepared by circumstances in which they must quickly decide what to do, then live out the consequences—often unintended—of their actions. Stylistically, Hamlin's stories and debut novel make extensive use of free indirect discourse and third-person narrative; very little of his narrative is written in first person. Much of his work features women as central point-of-view characters, and international settings such as Haiti under the regime of Jean-Claude Duvalier, Brazil, Morocco and Northern Ireland are common. Reviewers have noted Hamlin's close attention to sensory detail and use of exotic locales.

== Music ==
In addition to his literary work, Hamlin is a composer and performer of acoustic guitar music. His 2007 CD Rooted and subsequent work explores the possibilities of jazz- and Celtic-inflected fingerstyle guitar, making extensive use of altered tunings, especially DGDGCD and CGDGCD (“Orkney tuning”). Of Rooted, Minor 7th Magazine wrote: "This debut outing reveals a mature acoustic guitarist who is unnecessarily modest about his well-refined craft… The tone is elegiac… One hears surrender to the allure of the instrument, all in itself."
