= Barbara Lusch =

American jazz singer and actress

- Born: October 26, 1957 (age 68); Portland, Oregon, U.S.
- Education: Oregon State University
- Occupations: Actress; singer
- Years active: 1982–present
- Website: www.barbaralusch.com

Barbara Anne Lusch (born October 26, 1957) is an American jazz singer and actress from Portland, Oregon. She made her feature film debut in the slasher film Unhinged (1982) and later appeared onstage in the 1985 Atlantic City production of Fiddler on the Roof as Chava, opposite Theodore Bikel. She later had guest roles on the television series Coach (1989), The Trials of Rosie O'Neill (1990), and Nowhere Man (1996).

In the mid-1990s, Lusch began performing as a singer in local Portland bands before beginning a solo career in 2002, performing and recording contemporary jazz music.

== Biography ==
Lusch was born and raised in Portland, Oregon, the daughter Peggy (née Stoecklein) and Roy Lusch, a dentist. She graduated from Oregon State University. She made her feature film debut in the locally-produced slasher film Unhinged (1982). She later worked as a model in Los Angeles and San Francisco.

From October through December 1985, she appeared onstage at the east coast run of Fiddler on the Roof as Chava, opposite Theodore Bikel, Bess Meisler, and Fritzi Burr, staged at the Claridge Hotel in Atlantic City, New Jersey. She subsequently made appearances on the television series The Trials of Rosie O'Neill and Coach (both 1989).

She was a close friend of actress Rebecca Schaeffer, and spoke at Schaeffer's funeral following her 1989 murder. Lusch testified along with Schaeffer's agent Jonathan Newton, and her boyfriend, Brad Silberling, in the 1991 trail against Schaeffer's killer, Robert John Bardo.

Lusch began her career as a singer in the mid-1990s in the band Pepe and the Bottle Blondes. She began a solo career as a jazz singer in 2002, and released her self-titled debut album in 2005. This was followed by Surprisingly Good for You, released in 2006. Lusch has performed locally in her hometown of Portland at various venues, as well as at New York City's Metropolitan Room. In 2014, she released her second album, Rock Me Sweet, recorded at Capitol Studios, which consists of jazz interpretations of 1980s pop and rock songs.

In 2018, she had a supporting role in the film Pretty Broken. In 2024, Lusch made a minor appearance in the film My Dead Friend Zoe.

== Filmography ==
Year	Title	Role	Notes	Ref.
1982	Unhinged	Gloria		
1989	Criminal Act	Val		
1989	Coach	Coat Check Girl	2 episodes	
1990	After the Shock	Survivor		
1990	The Trials of Rosie O'Neill	Caroline	2 episodes	
1996	Nowhere Man	Brenda	1 episode	
1997	Total Reality	Marla		
1999	Birddog	Sydney		
2018	Pretty Broken	Sandy		
2024	My Dead Friend Zoe	Conductor		

== Stage credits ==
Year	Title	Role	Notes	Ref.
1985	Fiddler on the Roof	Chava	The Claridge Hotel, Atlantic City, New Jersey	

== Discography ==
- Barbara Lusch (2005, self-released)
- Surprisingly Good For You (2006, Blush Records)
- Rock Me Sweet (2014)
