= Ruth Zernova =

Soviet-born Israeli author and translator

- Руфь Александровна Зернова
- Born: 15 February 1919; Călărași, Bessarabia
- Died: 15 November 2004 (aged 85); Israel
- Education: Leningrad State University
- Occupations: Writer; translator
- Writing career
- Language: Russian

Ruth Aleksandrovna Zernova (Russian: Руфь Александровна Зернова; 1919–2004) also known as Rufʹ Zernova and Ruth Zevina, was a Soviet-born Israeli author and interpreter. She wrote short stories and novels.

== Early life and education ==
Ruth Zernova was born in Călărași, Bessarabia, in 1919. She was Jewish and grew up in Odessa. She attended Leningrad State University in 1936, where she studied literature. She also took Spanish classes. As a result, in year two of university, she was sent to Spain to work as an interpreter for Russian military leaders during the Spanish Civil War.

== Career and midlife ==
After returning from the Spanish Civil War, she worked for the Naval Reconnaissance Office. During World War II, she worked for TASS.

Zernova married Ilya Serman. The couple had two children together. They were arrested in 1949 and charged with spreading "anti-soviet propaganda." Both were sentenced to prison, with Zernova being sentenced to fifteen years. Their children were sent to live with grandparents. Zernova was released in 1954, after the death of Joseph Stalin. During her time in prison, she wrote about the experiences she had, including stories of the women she interacted with while imprisoned.

After her release from prison, Zernova translated novels from French and Spanish into Russian at home. She did not have her work published until the 1960s. She published her first original short story, "Skorpionovy Yagody" in Ogoniok in the early 1960s. Her published original work included stories of life in the Soviet labour camps and everyday Soviet life.

== Later life and legacy ==
Zernova eventually moved to Israel. In 1991, her book Mute Phone Calls was published by Rutgers University Press.

She died on 15 November 2004.

In 2005, a memorial event was held for Zernova at the Bowery Poetry Club in New York City.

Collections of Ruth Zernova are held at the Hoover Institution.

== Writings ==
- Mute Phone Calls (1991)
