= Chad Simpson (author) =

American author and professor

- Born: Monmouth, Illinois
- Education: Monmouth College (B.A.); Southern Illinois University at Carbondale (M.F.A.)
- Occupations: Author; Professor of English
- Awards: Second annual Micro Award in 2009

Chad Simpson is a short and flash fiction author from Monmouth, Illinois, United States. He is the winner of the 2012 John Simmons Short Fiction Award, juried by Jim Shepard. His short story collection, "Tell Everyone I Said Hi," was published by the University of Iowa Press in fall 2012.

He has written numerous stories that have appeared in multiple literary magazines. His flash story "Let x" won the second annual Micro Award in 2009. "Let x" originally appeared in Esquire.com. Simpson earned a B.A. from Monmouth College in 1998 and a M.F.A. from Southern Illinois University at Carbondale in 2005. He also is the author of a chapbook, "Phantoms," published in April 2010 by Origami Zoo Press. He is currently an associate professor of English at Knox College in Galesburg, Illinois, where he received the college's distinguished teaching award in 2010.
