= David Borofka =

American novelist and short story writer

David Borofka is an American novelist and short story writer. He is the author of the short story collection, Hints of His Mortality, which won the Iowa Short Fiction Award in 1996, and the novel, The Island (1997).

Borofka has won the Missouri Review’s Editors’ Prize, Carolina Quarterly's Charles B. Wood Award for Distinguished Writing, the Emerging Writers Network Fiction Prize, Prism Review Fiction Award, and the Nancy D. Hargrove Award from Jabberwock Review. His short fiction has also appeared in Image, Southern Review, Manoa, and Glimmer Train. He was a professor of composition, literature and creative writing at Reedley College until his retirement in 2019, but he continues to teach for the Writers' Program at UCLA Extension.

A second collection of stories, A Longing for Impossible Things, was released by Johns Hopkins University Press in 2022, and was awarded an American Book Award for the Short Story by American Book Fest. The last story in the collection, "Attachments for the Platonically Inclined," was reprinted under the title "Attachment" in Coolest American Stories 2023. A new novel, The End of Good Intentions, was published in 2023 by Fomite Press. The newest collection of stories, The Bliss of Your Attention, was published in January 2025 by Johns Hopkins UP.
