= Alpine Fellowship =

Charitable foundation

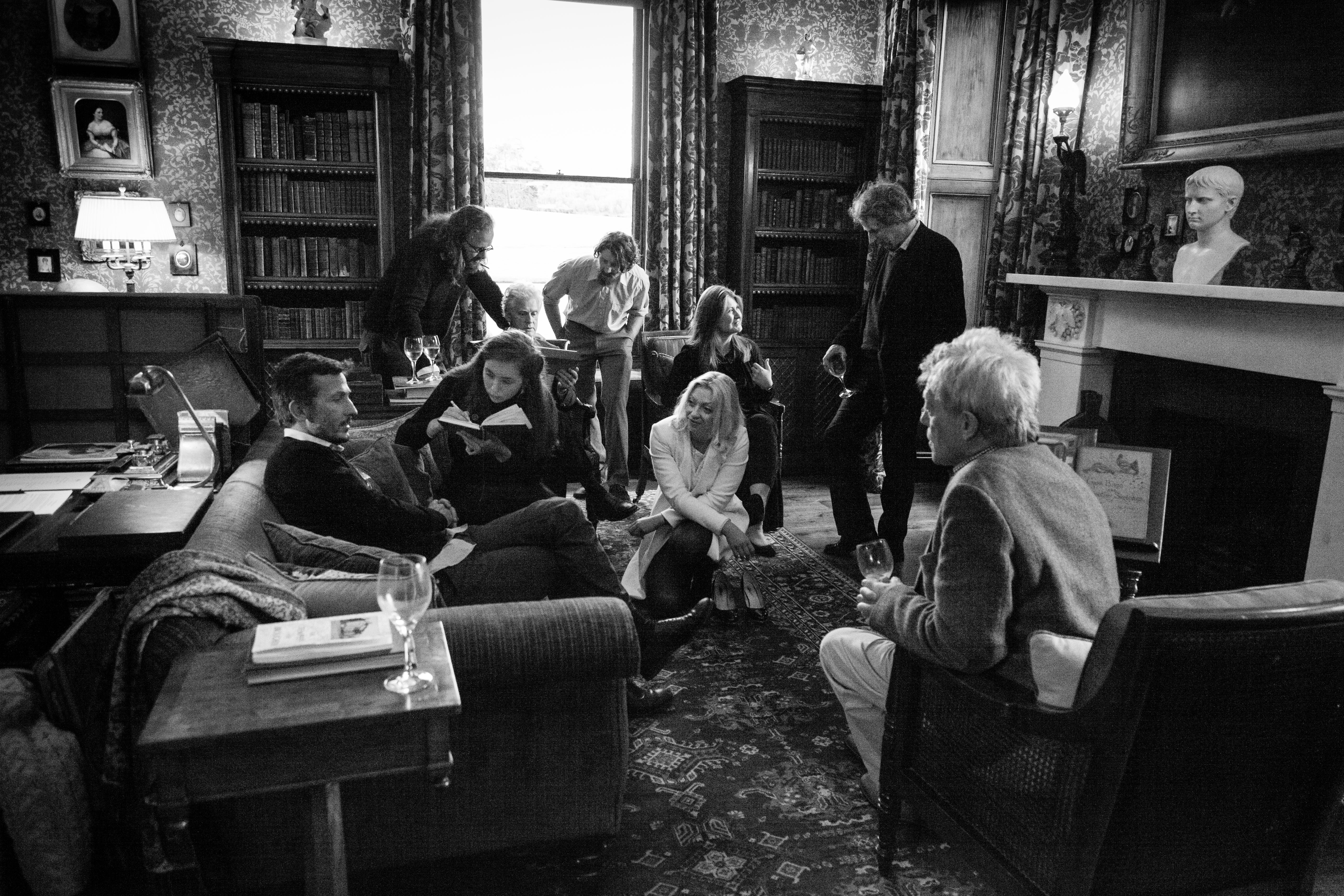

The Alpine Fellowship is a charitable foundation that supports, commissions and showcases artists, writers, academics and playwrights. It was founded in 2013 by artist Alan J Lawson and Jacob Burda.

== The Symposium ==
The focal point of activities is an annual symposium. The symposium 'draws together participants from academia, the arts and business' and they have been held on the themes of 'home', 'representation', 'the self-portrait', 'ephemera' and 'landscape'. Fellows, "can attend the symposium by competing in one of the different prize categories: drama, writing and visual arts."

Previous guests have included philosophers Simon May and Sir Roger Scruton, the novelist Ian McEwan, the poets, Ruth Padel, Gillian Clarke and John Burnside, film maker Luc Jacquet and art historians, including Andrew Graham-Dixon. Symposiums have been held in Switzerland, Scotland, and Italy.

== Prizes ==
The Alpine Fellowship offers prizes in Philosophy, Theatre, Poetry, Music, Writing, and Visual Arts. These are aimed at supporting emerging artists, writers and playwrights from around the world.

In addition to this, it also manages the Alpine Fellowship Refugee Scholar Prize, awarded in partnership with Bard College Berlin. This prize has been pledged to the United Nations High Commissioner for Refugees as part of the 15by30 Roadmap.

Since 2015, the Alpine Fellowship has supported programme at NYU ensuring financial support for students pursuing interdisciplinary research at the Graduate Level at NYU.

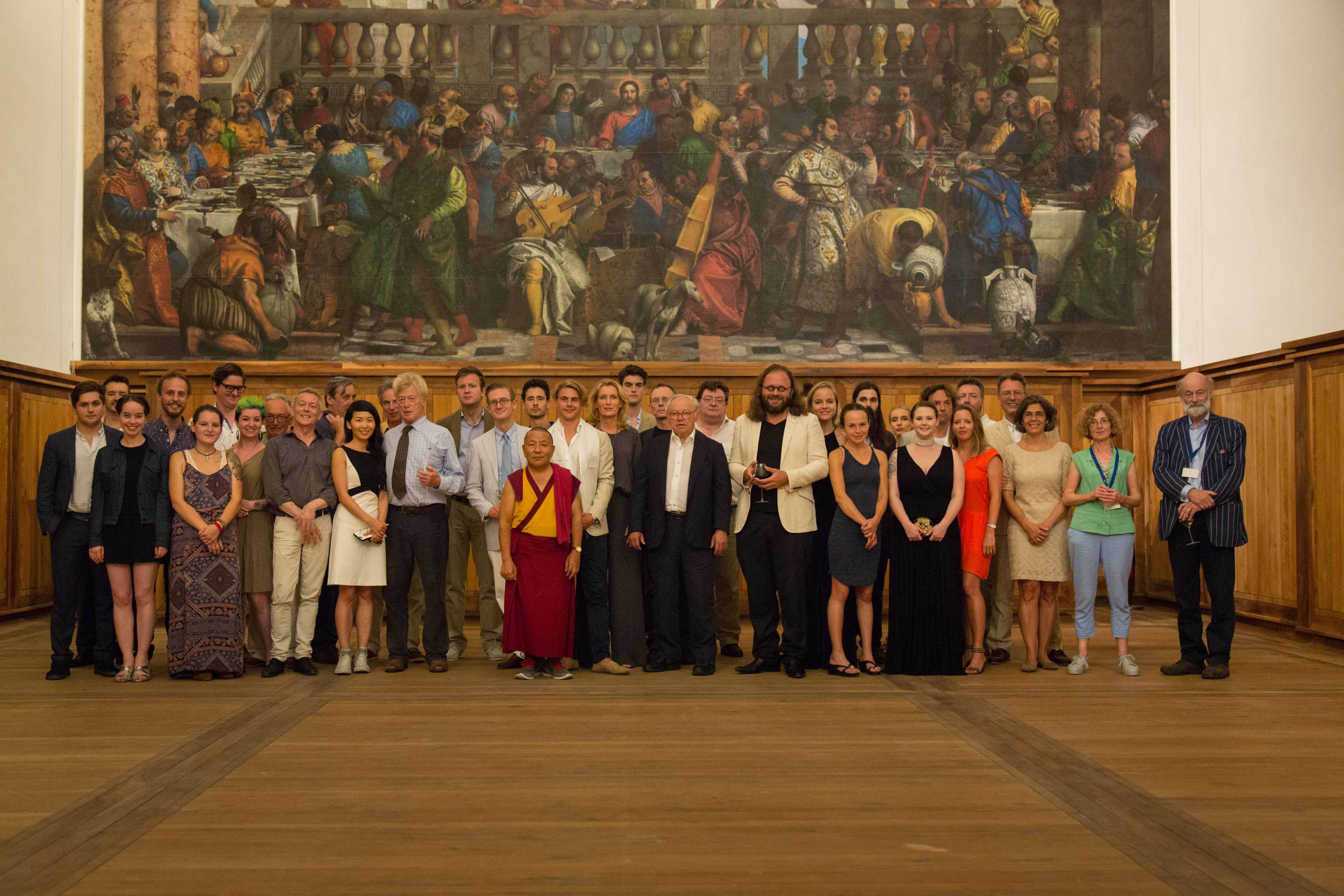

== Past events ==
In 2024, the theme was Language, speakers included Esther Perel, Es Devlin, John McWhorter and Martin Puchner.

In 2023, the theme was Flourishing, speakers and performers including Aloe Blacc, Diedre d'Albertis and Martin Aylward.

In 2022, the theme was 'Freedom' and speakers included Esther Perel, Yuval Harari and Clare Chambers (Philosopher).

The 2020 and 2021 symposiums were both cancelled due to the pandemic.

In 2019, the theme was 'Identity' and the symposium was hosted at Fjällnäs, Sweden.

In 2018, the theme was 'Childhood'.

In 2017, the Fellowship discussed the theme of 'Landscape'. Amongst other things, virtual reality pioneer Nonny de la Pena gave a talk on 'virtual landscapes' that stirred much debate.

In 2016, the Fellowship convened on the topic of ‘Ephemera’ and the nature of time. Philosophers Luciano Floridi and Mark Wrathall spoke to underline the way our self-understanding is inextricably bound up with our understanding of time.

The 2015, symposium convened over the theme 'authorittrato - self-expression in the age of instant communication'. Participants tried to trace the historical developments that occurred since Albrecht Dürer's self-portrait in 1500 to today's 'selfie-culture'.

In 2014, the Fellowship discussed the theme of 'representation' with contributions from the realms of academia, music and the visual arts. Philosophers emphasized the difficulties and dangers inherent in the subjectivist approach that regards the world as the 'mere' representation of the subject. The annual symposium was held at the Fondazione Giorgio Cini, on the island of San Giorgio, Venice, in the years 2015 through 2018.

== Advisory board ==
The advisory board includes Ayishat Akanbi, Andrew Huddleston, Nick Blood, Michael Lesslie, Iain Martin and Sukhdev Sandhu.
