= Kyle Hausmann-Stokes =

American film director and screenwriter

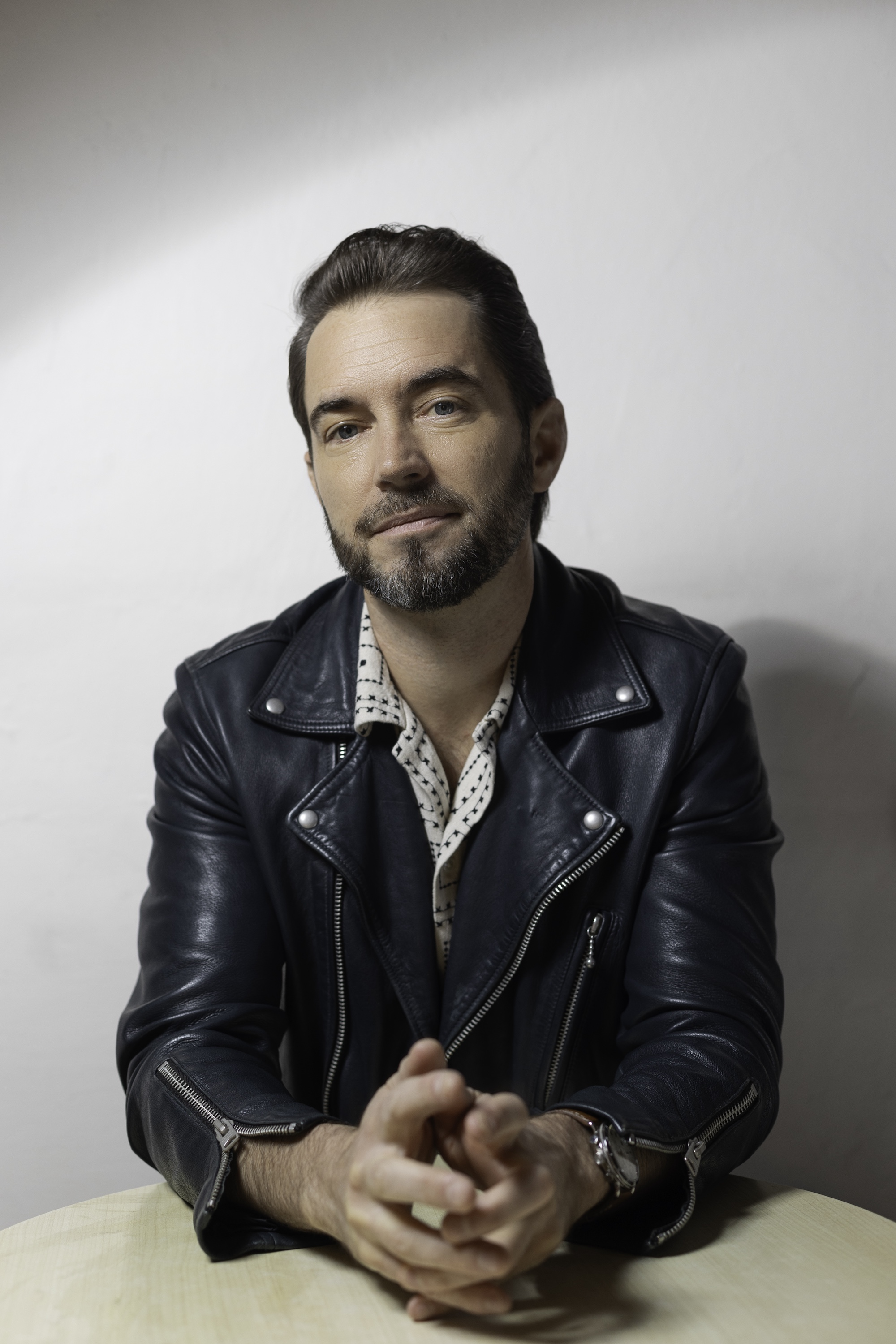
- Hausmann-Stokes in 2025
- Born: United States
- Occupations: Film director, screenwriter

Kyle Hausmann-Stokes is an American film director, screenwriter, and producer. His feature directorial debut My Dead Friend Zoe (2025)—based on his short film Merit x Zoe—won the 2024 South by Southwest Narrative Spotlight Audience Award and stars Sonequa Martin-Green, Natalie Morales, Ed Harris, and Morgan Freeman. The film was released in theaters nationwide on February 28, 2025, and has received a rating of at least 95% on Rotten Tomatoes.

Kyle enlisted in the US Army in August 2001 a month before 9/11, served 5 years as a paratrooper and received the Bronze Star Medal in the Iraq War. He used the G.I. Bill to graduate from USC film, after which he spent a decade directing commercials around the world for brands like Google, IBM, UPS, REI, US Air Force and Rocket Mortgage, etc.

Kyle is the co-founder Veterans in Media & Entertainment, the largest professional veteran x entertainment industry organization in Hollywood. Kyle is based in Los Angeles and represented by CAA and Untitled Entertainment. He is originally from Madison, Wisconsin.
