= Cyrus Colter =

American author

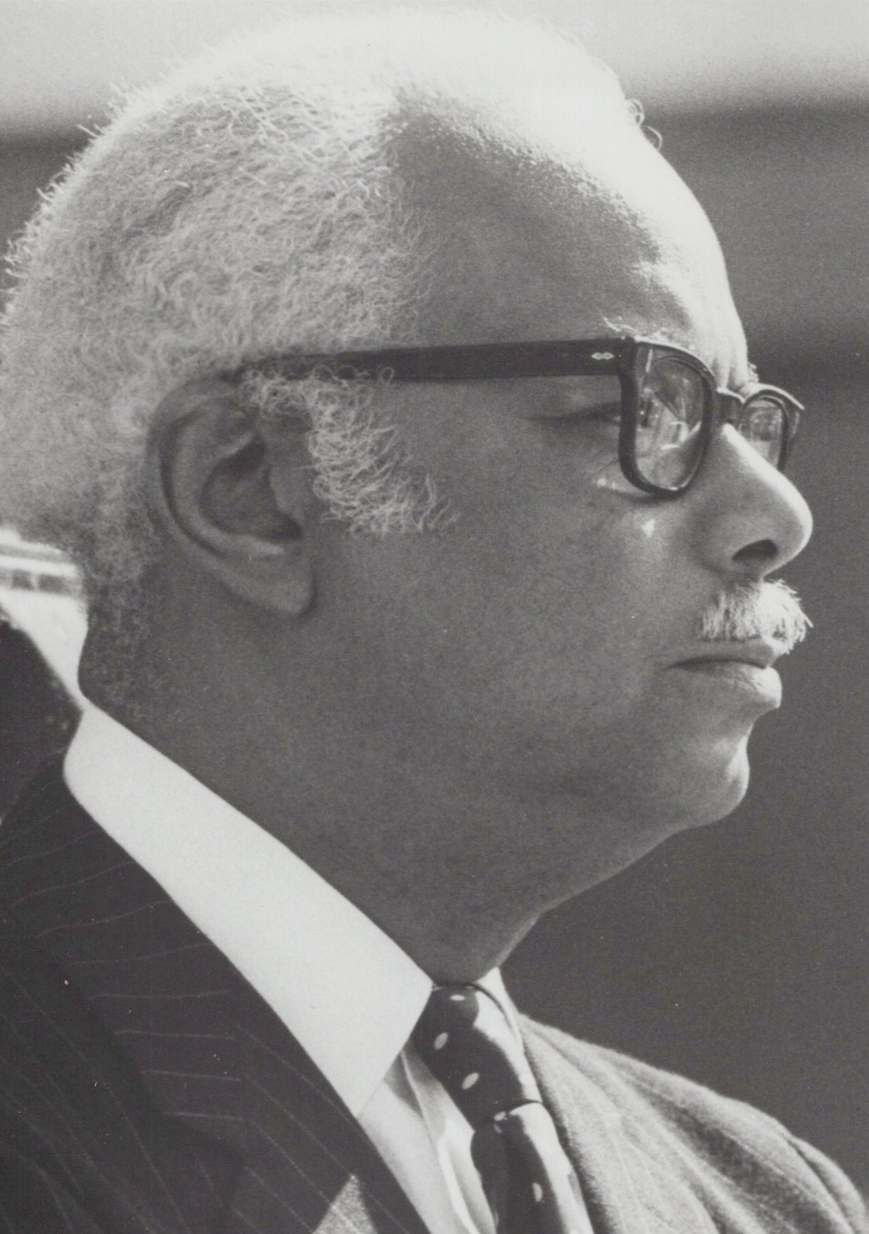
- Colter in 1972
- Born: Cyrus James Colter; January 8, 1910; Noblesville, Indiana, U.S.
- Died: April 15, 2002 (aged 92); Chicago, Illinois, U.S.
- Occupations: Writer; academic; lawyer
- Spouse: Imogene Mackay (m. 1943; died 1984)
- Writing career
- Period: 1960–2002
- Notable works: The Beach Umbrella (1970); Night Studies (1979); The Amoralists and Other Tales (1988); A Chocolate Soldier (1988)

Cyrus Colter (January 8, 1910 – April 15, 2002) was an American author. Trained as a lawyer and during an extended career in public service, he began writing short stories at aged 50. He joined the faculty at Northwestern University in the 1970s and became the first African American to occupy an endowed chair at the university. His short stories and novels often dealt with the lives of working and middle-class African Americans.

== Biography ==
Cyrus Colter was born in Noblesville, Indiana, on January 8, 1910, to James Alexander Colter and Ethel Marietta Basset Colter. His parents' families had come to Indiana in the 1830s from North Carolina in search of a "safe home for free blacks." James Alexander worked in insurance, as an actor, and for the state National Association for the Advancement of Colored People (NAACP). Ethel Marietta died when Cyrus Colter was six years old.

Colter was educated at the Rayan school when the family moved to Youngstown, Ohio. At Youngstown College and Ohio State University, he pursued an undergraduate degree during the Great Depression. In 1936, Colter moved to Chicago to study law at Chicago-Kent College of Law where he graduated in 1940. He served in Italy in the Army during World War II, and was promoted to captain. While practicing law in Chicago, Colter was appointed by Illinois Governor Adlai Stevenson to the Illinois Commerce Commission, where he remained until 1973 when he begin his career at Northwestern University.
