= Dave Hood =

American actor

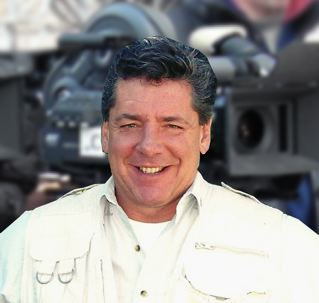
- Hood in 2010
- Born: November 1, 1950; Stevenson, Washington, U.S.
- Died: February 28, 2026 (aged 75)
- Occupations: Actor; filmmaker; radio personality
- Years active: 1968–2023

Dave Hood (November 1, 1950 – February 28, 2026) was an American actor, filmmaker and radio personality, best known for his award winning entertaining and educational children's productions. He has been host of many travel oriented programs including PM Magazine and Tourific Destinations on the Discovery Channel. Hood was most recognized as the co-creator, writer and star of Warner Bros.' - Real Wheels video series, a set of 23 children's videos which aimed to be both informative and entertaining. The series won a number of awards including the Parents' Choice Award.

== Career ==
Hood started his career as a radio personality at the age of 18 in Yakima, Washington. He worked his way to becoming the number-one afternoon drive personality at KGW in Portland, Oregon, before moving to KRTH in Los Angeles. He moved into television at the age of 30 as the host of the Oklahoma City version of the syndicated show PM Magazine at KTVY between 1982 and 1985 before traveling the world for Tourific Destinations on the Discovery Channel in the early 1990s. In 1993, he was best known for starting the live action children's video series Real Wheels, also called There Goes a..., with co-creator Ken Urman of Power to Create, featuring the There Goes a... theme. In every video, he was also the producer, writer, actor, and, director, and in some of the videos, he is accompanied by his sidekick, Becky. The series had sales near $8 million and won many awards including the Dove Foundation Award, The National Parenting Association Award, the Parents' Choice Award, and Kid's First Endorsement Award. The series was syndicated for television under the name Dream Big on more than 100 stations nationally in the late 1990s. In 1996, he started the live action children's video series, The Adventures of Dave and Becky, where he and Becky go on adventures around the world. During the early 2000s, the show was re-packaged and aired on PBS nationwide. Due to the popularity of the Real Wheels franchise, it also had a live tour that starred Dave. The show consisted of magic tricks and audience participation stunts. Prior to the show, there were real life vehicles that the audience would touch and look at. The tour lasted from 2001-2004 and was produced by Dave Hood Entertainment.

Hood continued to produce children's productions and other family entertainment including: Crazy Adventures with Harry and Susy - Spanish is FUN! with Susy Dorn, and The Family Ghost Hunters.

Hood also produced a series of Accessible Tourism videos with the USDA and small productions.

== Real Wheels ==
Hood was most notable for his creation of Real Wheels.

The Real Wheels series is a collection of children's videos (also known as There Goes a..., previously as Live Action Videos for Kids). Three episodes, There Goes a Garbage Truck, There Goes the Mail and There Goes a Rescue Vehicle, were released as a part of the short-lived Dream Big series. Each episode focuses on different transportation vehicles; however, one episode is reserved for Santa Claus, and another for roller coasters. Each is live-action, starring Hood, and is sometimes accompanied by a sidekick, Becky Borg. He is absent from There Goes a Tractor, Farm Truck, and Dump Truck and is replaced by David Sidoni, but comes back in 3 more episodes which are on Tanks, Rescue Heroes, and Buses.

== Filmography ==
=== Production work ===
- There Goes a... (1993–2003) - Writer (4 episodes), producer (4 episodes), director (3 episodes)
- The Adventures of Dave & Becky: In Search of the Haunted Goldmine (1996) - Writer
- The Adventures of Dave & Becky: In Search Pirate Treasure (1997) - Writer

=== Acting ===
- Real Wheels/There Goes a... (1993–2003) - Firefighter Dave, Pilot Dave, Construction Foreman Dave, Engineer Dave, Deputy Dave, Truck Driver Dave, various
- The Adventures of Dave & Becky: In Search of the Haunted Goldmine (1996) - Dave
- The Adventures of Dave & Becky: In Search Pirate Treasure (1997) - Dave

== Death ==
Hood died on February 28, 2026 at the age of 75 from complications after a coronary artery bypass surgery.
