= Stark Raving Mad (1981 film) =

- Directed by: George F. Hood
- Screenplay by: Don Grongquist
- Produced by: Don Gronquist
- Starring: Russ Fast; Marcie Severson
- Cinematography: J. Wilder Mincey
- Edited by: George F. Hood
- Distributed by: Independent Artists Releasing
- Release date: June 19, 1981
- Running time: 88 minutes
- Country: United States
- Language: English

Stark Raving Mad is a 1981 American crime film directed by George F. Hood, written by Don Gronquist, and starring Russ Faust and Marcie Severson. It depicts a fictionalized account of the Charles Starkweather and Caril Ann Fugate killings of the 1950s. It was released in January 1983.

== Plot ==
The film opens with convicted serial killer Richard Stark on death row and awaiting execution. While he waits in the death cell, he begins to relate the story of the circumstances that led to his present situation.

== Release ==
The film was released in Canada as Execution and in Australia as Murder Run.

== See also ==
- Badlands, a 1973 film about the Charles Starkweather murders
