= University of Iowa Press =

University press

- Parent company: University of Iowa
- Founded: 1969
- Country of origin: United States
- Headquarters location: Iowa City, Iowa
- Distribution: Chicago Distribution Center
- Publication types: Books
- Official website: www.uipress.uiowa.edu

The University of Iowa Press is a university press that is part of the University of Iowa.

Established in 1969, the University of Iowa Press is an academic publisher of poetry, short fiction, and creative nonfiction. The UI Press is the only university press in Iowa, also dedicated to the preservation of literature, history, culture, wildlife, and natural areas of the Midwest.

Scholarly titles include reference and course books, and trade books published by the UI Press include the winners of the Iowa Short Fiction Award and the Iowa Poetry Prize, as well as other titles.

The press is currently a member of the Association of University Presses.

== See also ==
- List of English-language book publishing companies
- List of university presses
