= The Best American Short Stories 1992 =

1992 short story collection

- Editor: Katrina Kenison and Robert Stone
- Language: English
- Series: The Best American Short Stories
- Published: 1992
- Publisher: Houghton Mifflin Harcourt
- Media type: Print (hardback & paperback)
- ISBN: 0395593530
- Preceded by: The Best American Short Stories 1991
- Followed by: The Best American Short Stories 1993

The Best American Short Stories 1992 is a volume in The Best American Short Stories series edited by Robert Stone with Katrina Kenison.

== Short stories included ==
Author	Story	Source
Alice Adams	"The Last Lovely City"	The New Yorker
Rick Bass	"Days of Heaven"	Ploughshares
Thomas Beller	"A Different Kind of Imperfection"	The New Yorker
Amy Bloom	"Silver Water"	Story
Robert Olen Butler	"A Good Scent from a Strange Mountain"	New England Review
Mavis Gallant	"Across the Bridge"	The New Yorker
Tim Gautreaux	"Same Place, Same Things"	The Atlantic Monthly
Denis Johnson	"Emergency"	The New Yorker
Thom Jones	"The Pugilist at Rest"	The New Yorker
Marshall Klimasewiski	"JunHee"	The New Yorker
Lorrie Moore	"Community Life"	The New Yorker
Alice Munro	"Carried Away"	The New Yorker
Joyce Carol Oates	"Is Laughter Contagious?"	Harper's Magazine
Reynolds Price	"The Fare to the Moon"	The Southern Review
Annick Smith	"It's Come to This"	Story
Christopher Tilghman	"The Way People Run"	The New Yorker
David Foster Wallace	"Forever Overhead"	Fiction International
Kate Wheeler	"Under the Roof"	Black Warrior Review
Elizabeth Winthrop	"The Golden Darters"	American Short Fiction
Tobias Wolff	"Firelight"	Story
