= The Best American Short Stories 1995 =

1995 short story collection

- Editor: Katrina Kenison and Jane Smiley
- Language: English
- Series: The Best American Short Stories
- Published: 1995
- Publisher: Houghton Mifflin Harcourt
- Media type: Print (hardback & paperback)
- ISBN: 0395711797
- Preceded by: The Best American Short Stories 1994
- Followed by: The Best American Short Stories 1996

The Best American Short Stories 1995, a volume in The Best American Short Stories series, was edited by Katrina Kennison and by guest editor Jane Smiley.

== Short stories included ==
Author	Story	Source
Daniel Orozco	"Orientation"	The Seattle Review
Thom Jones	"Way down Deep in the Jungle"	The New Yorker
Ellen Gilchrist	"The Stucco House"	The Atlantic Monthly
Jaimy Gordon	"A Night's Work"	The Michigan Quarterly Review
Avner Mandelbaum	"Pity"	Zyzzyva
Steven Polansky	"Leg"	The New Yorker
Peter Ho Davies	"The Ugliest House in the World"	The Antioch Review
Gish Jen	"Birthmates"	Ploughshares
Edward J. Delaney	"The Drowning"	The Atlantic Monthly
Joy Williams	"Honored Guest"	Harper's Magazine
Andrea Barrett	"The Behavior of the Hawkweeds"	The Missouri Review
Andrew Cozine	"Hand Jive"	The Iowa Review
Stephen Dobyns	"So I Guess You Know What I Told Him"	Ploughshares
Jennifer C. Cornell	"Undertow"	New England Review
Kate Braverman	"Pagan Night"	Zyzzyva
Melanie Rae Thon	"First, Body"	Anteus
Don DeLillo	"The Angel Esmeralda"	Esquire
Edward Falco	"The Artist"	The Atlantic Monthly
Max Garland	"Chiromancy"	The New England Review
Jamaica Kincaid	"Xuela"	The New Yorker
