= The Best American Short Stories 1996 =

1996 short story collection

- Editor: Katrina Kenison and John Edgar Wideman
- Language: English
- Series: The Best American Short Stories
- Published: 1996
- Publisher: Houghton Mifflin Harcourt
- Media type: Print (hardback & paperback)
- ISBN: 0395752914
- Preceded by: The Best American Short Stories 1995
- Followed by: The Best American Short Stories 1997

The Best American Short Stories 1996, a volume in The Best American Short Stories series, was edited by Katrina Kenison and by guest editor John Edgar Wideman.

== Short stories included ==
Author	Story	Source
Alice Adams	"Complicities"	Michigan Quarterly Review
Rick Bass	"Fires"	Big Sky Journal
Jason Brown	"Driving the Heart"	Mississippi Review
Robert Olen Butler	"Jealous Husband Returns in Form of Parrot"	The New Yorker
Lan Samantha Chang	"The Eve of the Spirit Festival"	Prairie Schooner
Dan Chaon	"Fitting Ends"	TriQuarterly
Peter Ho Davies	"The Silver Screen"	Harvard Review
Junot Díaz	"Ysrael"	Story
Stephen Dixon	"Sleep"	Harpers Magazine
Stuart Dybek	"Paper Lantern"	The New Yorker
Deborah Galyan	"The Incredible Appearing Man"	Missouri Review
Mary Gordon	"Intertextuality"	The Recorder
David Huddle	"Past My Future"	Story
Anna Keesey	"Bright Winter"	Grand Street
Jamaica Kincaid	"In Roseau"	The New Yorker
William Henry Lewis	"Shades"	Ploughshares
William Lychack	"A Stand of Fables"	Quarterly West
Joyce Carol Oates	"Ghost Girls"	American Short Fiction
Angela Patrinos	"Sculpture I"	The New Yorker
Susan Perabo	"Some Say the Word"	TriQuarterly
Lynn Sharon Schwartz	"The Trip to Halawa Valley"	Shenandoah
Akhil Sharma	"If You Sing Like That for Me"	The Atlantic Monthly
Jean Thompson	"All Shall Love Me and Despair"	Mid-American Review
Melanie Rae Thon	"Xmas, Jamaica Plain"	Ontario Review
