= The Best American Short Stories 2003 =

2003 short story collection

- Editor: Katrina Kenison and Walter Mosley
- Language: English
- Series: The Best American Short Stories
- Published: 2003
- Publisher: Houghton Mifflin Harcourt
- Media type: Print (hardback & paperback)
- ISBN: 0618197338
- Preceded by: The Best American Short Stories 2002
- Followed by: The Best American Short Stories 2004

The Best American Short Stories 2003, a volume in The Best American Short Stories series, was edited by Katrina Kenison and by guest editor Walter Mosley.

== Short stories included ==
| Author | Story | Source |
|---|---|---|
| Mary Yukari Waters | "Rationing" | The Missouri Review |
| Susan Straight | "Mines" | Zoetrope |
| Mona Simpson | "Coins" | Harper's Magazine |
| Jess Row | "Heaven Lake" | Harvard Review |
| Emily Ishem Raboteau | "Kavita Through Glass" | Tin House |
| Sharon Pomerantz | "Ghost Knife" | Ploughshares |
| Marilene Phipps | "Marie-Ange's Ginen" | Callaloo |
| Dean Paschall | "Moriya" | Ontario Review |
| ZZ Packer | "Every Tongue Shall Confess" | Ploughshares |
| Nicole Krauss | "Further Emergencies" | Esquire |
| Adam Haslett | "Devotion" | The Yale Review |
| Ryan Harty | "Why the Sky Turns Red When the Sun Goes Down" | Tin House |
| Louise Erdrich | "Shamengwa" | The New Yorker |
| Anthony Doerr | "The Shell Collector" | Chicago Review |
| E. L. Doctorow | "Baby Wilson" | The New Yorker |
| Edwidge Danticat | "Night Talkers" | Callaloo |
| Rand Richards Cooper | "Johnny Hamburger" | Esquire |
| Dan Chaon | "The Bees" | Timothy McSweeney's Quarterly Concern |
| Kevin Brockmeier | "Space" | The Georgia Review |
| Dorothy Allison | "Compassion" | Tin House |

== Other notable stories ==
Among the other notable writers whose stories were among the "100 Other Distinguished Stories of 2002" were Andrea Barrett, Rick Bass, Robert Coover, Donald Hall, Brad Vice, Joyce Carol Oates, Grace Paley, John Updike and John Edgar Wideman.
