= The Best American Short Stories 1993 =

1993 short story collection

- Editor: Katrina Kenison and Louise Erdrich
- Language: English
- Series: The Best American Short Stories
- Published: 1993
- Publisher: Houghton Mifflin Harcourt
- Media type: Print (hardback & paperback)
- ISBN: 0395636272
- Preceded by: The Best American Short Stories 1992
- Followed by: The Best American Short Stories 1994

The Best American Short Stories 1993, a volume in The Best American Short Stories series, was edited by Katrina Kenison and by guest editor Louise Erdrich.

== Short stories included ==
Author	Story	Source
John Updike	"Playing with Dynamite"	The New Yorker
Mary Gaitskill	'The Girl on the Plane"	Mirabella
Alice Munro	"A Real Life"	The New Yorker
Larry Woiwode	"Silent Passengers"	The New Yorker
Alice Fulton	"Queen Wintergreen"	TriQuarterly
Harlan Ellison	"The Man Who Rowed Christopher Columbus Ashore"	Omni
Jane Shapiro	"Poltergeists"	The New Yorker
Susan Power	"Red Mocassions	Story
Thom Jones	"I Want to Live!"	Harper's Magazine
Tony Earley	"Charlotte"	Harper's Magazine
Janet Peery	"What the Thunder Said"	Black Warrior Review
Antonya Nelson	"Naked Ladies"	The New Yorker
Stephen Dixon	"Man, Woman, Boy"	Western Humanities Review
Andrea Lee	"Winter Barley"	The New Yorker
Joanna Scott	"Concerning Mold Upon the Skin, Etc."	Anteaus
Wendell Berry	"Pray Without Ceasing"	The Southern Review
Kim Edwards	"Gold"	Anteaus
Diane Johnson	"Great Barrier Reef"	The New Yorker
Lorrie Moore	"Terrific Mother"	The Paris Review
Mary Gordon	"The Important Houses"	The New Yorker
