= The Best American Short Stories 1994 =

1994 short story collection

- Editor: Katrina Kenison and Tobias Wolff
- Language: English
- Series: The Best American Short Stories
- Published: 1994
- Publisher: Houghton Mifflin Harcourt
- Media type: Print (hardback & paperback)
- ISBN: 0395681022
- Preceded by: The Best American Short Stories 1993
- Followed by: The Best American Short Stories 1995

The Best American Short Stories 1994, a volume in The Best American Short Stories series, was edited by Katrina Kenison and by guest editor Tobias Wolff.

== Short stories included ==
Author	Story	Source
Sherman Alexie	"This Is What It Means to Say Phoenix, Arizona"	Esquire
Carol Anshaw	"Hammam"	Story
Robert Olen Butler	"Salem"	Mississippi Review
Lan Samantha Chang	"Pipa's Story"	The Atlantic Monthly
Ann Cummins	"Where I Work"	Room of One's Own
Alice Elliott Dark	"In the Gloaming"	The New Yorker
Stuart Dybek	"We Didn't"	Antaeus
Tony Earley	"The Prophet from Jupiter"	Harper's Magazine
Carolyn Ferrell	"Proper Library"	Ploughshares
John Rolfe Gardiner	"The Voyage Out"	The New Yorker
David Gates	"The Mail Lady"	Grand Street
Barry Hannah	"Nicodemus Bluff"	The Carolina Quarterly
Thom Jones	"Cold Snap"	The New Yorker
John Keeble	"The Chasm"	Prairie Schooner
Nancy Krusoe	"Landscape and Dream"	The Georgia Review
Laura Glen Louis	"Fur"	Ploughshares
Chris Offutt	"Melungeons"	Story
Roxana Robinson	"Mr. Sumarsono"	The Atlantic Monthly
Jim Shepard	"Batting Against Castro"	The Paris Review
Christopher Tilghman	"Things Left Undone"	The Southern Review
Jonathan Wilson	"From Shanghai"	Ploughshares
