= Hunger (short story collection) =

1998 short story collection by Lan Samantha Chang

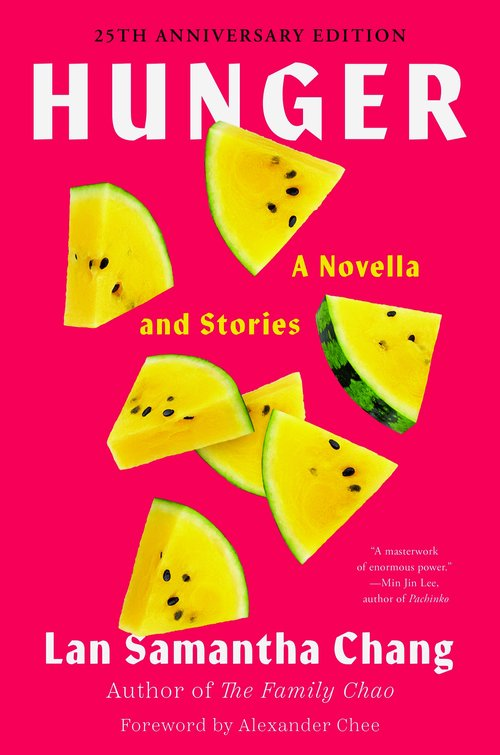
- The 25th anniversary edition with foreword by Alexander Chee
- Author: Lan Samantha Chang
- Language: English
- Genre: Literary fiction
- Publisher: W. W. Norton (US)
- Publication date: 1998
- Publication place: United States
- Pages: 193
- ISBN: 0393046648
- OCLC: 317919688
- LC Class: PS3553.H2724 H86 1998

Hunger is a short story collection by American writer Lan Samantha Chang, published in 1998 by W. W. Norton.

It won the Commonwealth Club of California's California Book Award's Silver Medal for Fiction and was a finalist for the Los Angeles Times Book Awards's Art Seidenbaum Award for First Fiction.

== Plot ==
Hunger includes the titular novella and five short stories: "The Unforgetting", "The Eve of the Spirit Festival", "Water Names", "Pipa's Story" and "San".

The narratives follow Chinese Americans in the US and China, and they explore home, family, and loss.

== Writing and development ==
Hunger is Chang's debut book of fiction. The stories were inspired by her parents' "sense of disengagement" after leaving China for the US. She described her characters as "fictional contemporaries" of her parents, whom she "created to better understand the reasons for generational silence".

In the house she grew up in Appleton, Wisconsin, there was "no sense of family history". The book was her way of addressing the strife occasioned by such silence. She cited as inspiration the fiction of Jewish writers Bernard Malamud and Philip Roth, who, she said, "write about very fraught communication between parents and children".

== Reception and accolades ==
=== Critical reception ===
Hunger was critically acclaimed in the US upon release.

Kirkus Reviews praised it as "wonderfully written" and "The debut of a writer possessing a distinctive, fresh imagination and voice". The Washington Post called it "A work of gorgeous, enduring prose".

The New York Times Book Review called it "Elegant.… A delicately calculated balance sheet of the losses and gains of immigrants whose lives are stretched between two radically different cultures." Chicago Tribune wrote: "Chang's stories open up to readers a world of sadness and regret. So often, her characters can't break barriers of silence with one another to uncover true feelings. The end result is that sometimes parents can't give their children what they need most: a firm foundation of cultural and family history".

=== Awards ===
Hunger won the California Book Awards' Silver Medal for Fiction and was a finalist for the Los Angeles Times Book Awards's Art Seidenbaum Award for First Fiction.

Before Hunger was published, "Pipa’s Story" appeared in The Best American Short Stories 1994 and "The Eve of the Spirit Festival" in The Best American Short Stories 1996.

== 25th anniversary ==
In 2023, W.W. Norton announced a 25th anniversary reissue of Hunger. In a comment to The Washington Post, Min Jin Lee said: "I read Hunger again this fall, because I return to great work when I need to be nourished. A literary classic, Chang’s collection is a remarkable achievement and turns a quarter of a century next year."
