= The Best American Short Stories 1991 =

1991 short story collection

- Editor: Katrina Kenison and Alice Adams
- Language: English
- Series: The Best American Short Stories
- Published: 1991
- Publisher: Houghton Mifflin Harcourt
- Media type: Print (hardback & paperback)
- ISBN: 0395544092
- Preceded by: The Best American Short Stories 1990
- Followed by: The Best American Short Stories 1992

The Best American Short Stories 1991, a volume in The Best American Short Stories series, was edited by Katrina Kenison and by guest editor Alice Adams.

== Short stories included ==
Author	Story	Source
Rick Bass	"The Legend of Pig-Eye"	The Paris Review
Charles Baxter	'The Disappeared"	Michigan Quarterly Review
Amy Bloom	"Love Is Not a Pie"	Room of One's Own
Kate Braverman	"Tall Tales from the Mekong Delta"	Squandering the Blue
Robert Olen Butler	"The Trip Back"	The Southern Review
Charles D'Ambrosio	"The Point"	The New Yorker
Millicent Dillon	"Oil and Water"	Southwest Review
Harriet Doerr	"Another Short Day in La Luz"	The New Yorker
Deborah Eisenberg	"The Custodian"	The New Yorker
Mary Gordon	"The Separation"	Antaeus
Elizabeth Graver	"The Body Shop"	The Southern Review
Siri Hustvedt	"Houdini"	Fiction
Mikhail Iossel	"Bologove"	Boulevard
David Jauss	"Glossolalia"	Shenandoah
Leonard Michaels	"Viva la Tropicana"	ZYZZYVA
Lorrie Moore	"Willing"	The New Yorker
Alice Munro	"Friends of My Youth"	The New Yorker
Joyce Carol Oates	"American, Abroad"	The North American Review
Francine Prose	"Dog Stories"	Special Report-Fiction
John Updike	"A Sandstone Farmhouse"	The New Yorker
