= The Lotus and the Storm =

Novel by Lan Cao

- Cover of The Lotus and the Storm
- Author: Lan Cao
- Cover artist: Monish Matthias
- Language: English
- Genre: Fiction, Literary
- Publisher: Viking/Penguin Books
- Publication date: 2014
- Publication place: United States
- Media type: Print
- Pages: 400 pp (first edition)
- ISBN: 978-0-670-01692-1
- Preceded by: Monkey Bridge

The Lotus and the Storm is a 2014 historical fiction novel written by Vietnamese author Lan Cao.

The novel tells the story of a family whose lives are altered by the tragic events that led to the fall of Saigon. The chapters alternate between the life of a once admired soldier, who is now weak and ailing, in his home in the suburbs of Washington, D.C., and that of his daughter Mai, who grew up in Saigon's twin city, Cholon.

== Plot summary ==
Minh is a former South Vietnamese commander of the airborne brigade who left his homeland with his daughter, Mai. During the war, their lives became entwined with those of two Americans: James, a soldier, and Cliff, a military adviser. Forty years later, Minh and his daughter Mai live in a close-knit Vietnamese immigrant community in suburban Virginia. As Mai discovers a series of devastating truths about what really happened to her family during those years, Minh reflects upon his life and the story of love and betrayal that has remained locked in his heart since the fall of Saigon.

The Lotus and the Storm is a tale of people who rebuild their lives in the aftermath of war and broken promises. Despite pain and loss, they find an inner strength that restores their capacity to forgive, love, and live.

== Reception ==
"The Lotus and the Storm is part beautiful family saga, part coming-of-age story, part love story, but above all a searing indictment of the American campaign in Vietnam and its incalculable toll on generations past and future. A powerful read from start to end." -Khaled Hosseini, author of The Kite Runner; A Thousand Splendid Suns; And the Mountains Echoed.

"Lan Cao is not just one of the finest of the American writers who spring from war and profoundly understand the war in Vietnam and the Vietnamese diaspora. She is certainly that. She is also one of our finest American writers. Period. The Lotus and the Storm is a brilliant novel that illuminates the human condition shared by us all." – Robert Olen Butler, 1993 Pulitzer Prize for Fiction.

"A profoundly moving novel about the shattering effects of war on a young girl, her family, and her country. In sensuous and searing detail, Lan Cao brings Saigon’s past vividly to life through the eyes of her child narrator, Mai, following the girl and her father halfway around the world, to a suburb in Virginia, where forty years later, Mai’s trauma unravels. In this fractured world where old wars, loves and losses live on, The Lotus and the Storm is a passionate testament to the truth that the past is present—inseparable, inescapable, enduring." – Ruth Ozeki, author of A Tale for the Time Being.

"A heart-wrenching and heartwarming epic about war and love, hurt and healing, losing and rediscovering homelands. Through the mesmerizing voices of a Vietnamese-born father and his daughter resettled in Virginia’s "Little Saigon" after the fall of Saigon, Lan Cao dramatizes landmark battles in the Vietnam War and the toll such battles take on winners and losers. The Lotus and The Storm establishes Lan Cao as a world-class writer." – Bharati Mukherjee, 1988 Winner of the National Book Critics Circle Award.
