= The Best American Short Stories 2004 =

2004 short story collection

- Editor: Katrina Kenison and Lorrie Moore
- Language: English
- Series: The Best American Short Stories
- Published: 2004
- Publisher: Houghton Mifflin Harcourt
- Media type: Print (hardback & paperback)
- ISBN: 0618197354
- Preceded by: The Best American Short Stories 2003
- Followed by: The Best American Short Stories 2005

The Best American Short Stories 2004, a volume in The Best American Short Stories series, was edited by Katrina Kenison and by guest editor Lorrie Moore.

== Short stories included ==
Author	Story	Where story previously appeared
Sherman Alexie	"What You Pawn I Will Redeem"	The New Yorker
T. Coraghessan Boyle	"Tooth and Claw"	The New Yorker
Catherine Brady	"Written in Stone"	Zyzzyva
Sarah Shun-Lien Bynum	"Accomplice"	The Georgia Review
Charles D'Ambrosio	"Screenwriter"	The New Yorker
Stuart Dybek	"Breasts"	Tin House
Deborah Eisenberg	"Some Other, Better Otto"	The Yale Review
Paula Fox	"Grace"	Harper's Magazine
Nell Freudenberger	"The Tutor"	Granta
Edward P. Jones	"A Rich Man"	The New Yorker
Trudy Lewis	"Limestone Diner"	Meridian
Jill McCorkle	"Intervention"	Ploughshares
Thomas McGuane	"Gallatin Canyon"	The New Yorker
Alice Munro	"Runaway"	The New Yorker
Angela Pneuman	"All Saints Day"	Virginia Quarterly Review
Annie Proulx	"What Kind of Furniture Would Jesus Pick"	The New Yorker
R. T. Smith	"Docent"	The Missouri Review
John Updike	"The Walk with Elizanne"	The New Yorker
Mary Yukari Waters	"Mirror Studies"	Zoetrope
John Edgar Wideman	"What We Cannot Speak About We Must Pass Over in Silence"	Harper's Magazine

== Other notable stories ==
Among the other notable writers whose stories were among the "100 Other Distinguished Stories of 2003" were Max Apple, Kevin Brockmeier, Dan Chaon, Stephen King, Arthur Miller, Joyce Carol Oates and Joy Williams.
