= Victoria Wilson (publisher and writer) =

American publishing executive (born 1949)

- Born: 1949 (age 76–77); New York City, U.S.
- Education: Goddard College; New School for Social Research
- Occupation: Publishing executive
- Parent(s): Mitchell A. Wilson; Helen Weinberg Wilson
- Relatives: Stella Adler (stepmother)

Victoria "Vicky" Wilson (born 1949) is an American publishing executive and writer who served on the United States Commission on Civil Rights (USCCR) from 2000 through 2001.

== Early and personal life ==
Wilson was born in New York City and grew up on Martha's Vineyard. She attended Goddard College and New York's New School for Social Research.

Her father, physicist Mitchell Wilson, was a novelist who had a book adapted by Jean Renoir into The Woman on the Beach. Her mother Helen was a patients' rights advocate. Wilson is the stepdaughter of Stella Adler.

Her restored home was featured in The New York Times.

== Career ==
She began working at Alfred A. Knopf Publishers in 1972, and she was promoted in 1988 to Senior Editor, Vice President, and Associate Publisher. Authors she edits include Alice Adams, William Gass, Jane Sherron de Hart, Lorrie Moore, Anne Rice, and Meryle Secrest

She also held several positions at the PEN American Center, including the executive board and Treasurer from 1997 to 1999. She also served as Vice President of the National Board of Review of Motion Pictures. She taught in the writing program at Columbia University from 1992 to 1993.

Wilson was appointed by Bill Clinton to the USCCR vacancy left by the 1998 death of A. Leon Higginbotham Jr. Wilson voted in support of a USCCR report which found voting irregularities in Florida during the 2000 United States presidential election. Once in office, President George W. Bush attempted to replace Wilson with Peter Kirsanow, but USCCR Commissioner Mary Frances Berry refused Krisanow a seat. Kirsanow sued, claiming Wilson's tenure had expired and he had been validly appointed. Wilson won in federal district court but ultimately lost on appeal in 2002, and the court ordered the seating of Kirsanow following a lengthy legal battle.

She has published one volume of her planned two-volume biography of Barbara Stanwyck, A Life of Barbara Stanwyck: Steel-True, 1907-1940. A review in Publishers Weekly reviewed, "Wilson includes a wealth of intriguing material but her meticulous research weighs heavily on the narrative, making it hard to plow through. Nevertheless, history buffs and fans will be educated, if not always entertained". Kirkus Reviews said, "Despite its overreach, this is an ambitious portrait of a young actress whose best films are still ahead of her—a first volume that should whet readers' appetite for the second, provided they have the stamina to stay with it".
