= The Best American Short Stories 2005 =

2005 short story collection

- Editor: Katrina Kenison and Michael Chabon
- Language: English
- Series: The Best American Short Stories
- Published: 2005
- Publisher: Houghton Mifflin Harcourt
- Media type: Print (hardback & paperback)
- ISBN: 0618427058
- Preceded by: The Best American Short Stories 2004
- Followed by: The Best American Short Stories 2006

The Best American Short Stories 2005, a volume in The Best American Short Stories series, was edited by Katrina Kenison and by guest editor Michael Chabon.

== Short stories included ==
Author	Story	Where story previously appeared
Tom Perrotta	"The Smile on Happy Chang's Face"	Post Road
Dennis Lehane	"Until Gwen"	The Atlantic Monthly
Lynne Sharon Schwartz	"A Taste of Dust"	Ninth Letter
Thomas McGuane	"Old Friends"	The New Yorker
J. Robert Lennon	"Eight Pieces for the Left Hand"	Granta
Kelly Link	"Stone Animals"	Conjunctions
Nathaniel Bellows	"First Four Measures"	The Paris Review
Charles D'Ambrosio	"The Scheme of Things"	The New Yorker
Alice Munro	"Silence"	The New Yorker
Tom Bissell	"Death Defier"	Virginia Quarterly Review
Joy Williams	"The Girls"	Idaho Review
Cory Doctorow	"Anda's Game"	Salon.com
Alix Ohlin	"Simple Exercises for the Beginning Student"	Swink
Edward P. Jones	"Old Boys, Old Girls"	The New Yorker
David Means	"The Secret Goldfish"	The New Yorker
Joyce Carol Oates	"The Cousins"	Harper's Magazine
David Bezmozgis	"Natasha"	Harper's Magazine
Tim Pratt	"Hart and Boot"	Polyphony
Rishi Reddi	"Justice Shiva Ram Murthy"	Harvard Review
George Saunders	"Bohemians"	The New Yorker

== Other notable stories ==
Among the other notable writers whose stories were among the "100 Other Distinguished Stories of 2005" were Ann Beattie, E. L. Doctorow, Jhumpa Lahiri, Rick Moody, Gina Ochsner and John Updike.
