= The Best American Short Stories 2002 =

2002 short story collection

- Editor: Katrina Kenison and Sue Miller
- Language: English
- Series: The Best American Short Stories
- Published: 2002
- Publisher: Houghton Mifflin Harcourt
- Media type: Print (hardback & paperback)
- ISBN: 0395926866
- Preceded by: The Best American Short Stories 2001
- Followed by: The Best American Short Stories 2003

The Best American Short Stories 2002, a volume in The Best American Short Stories series, was edited by Katrina Kenison and by guest editor Sue Miller.

== Short stories included ==
Author	Story	Source
Michael Chabon	"Along the Frontage Road"	The New Yorker
Carolyn Cooke	"The Sugar-Tit"	Agni
Ann Cummins	"The Red Ant House"	McSweeney's
Edwidge Danticat	"Seven"	The New Yorker
E. L. Doctorow	"A House on the Plains"	The New Yorker
Richard Ford	"Puppy"	The Southwest Review
Melissa Hardy	"The Heifer"	Descant
Karl Iagnemma	"Zilkowski's Theorem"	Zoetrope
Jhumpa Lahiri	"Nobody's Business"	The New Yorker
Beth Lordan	"Digging"	The Atlantic Monthly
Alice Mattison	"In Case We're Separated"	Ploughshares
Jill McCorkle	"Billy Goats"	Bomb
Tom McNeal	"Watermelon Days"	Zoetrope
Leonard Michaels	"Nachman from Los Angeles"	The New Yorker
Arthur Miller	"Bulldog"	The New Yorker
Meg Mullins	"The Rug"	The New Yorker
Alice Munro	"Family Furnishings"	The New Yorker
Akhil Sharma	"Surrounded by Sleep"	The New Yorker
Jim Shepard	"Love and Hydrogen"	Harper's Magazine
Mary Yukari Waters	"Aftermath"	Manoa

== Other notable stories ==
Among the other notable writers whose stories were in the "100 Other Distinguished Stories of 2001" were Ann Beattie, Dan Chaon, Stuart Dybek, Louise Erdrich, Joyce Carol Oates, Bob Shacochis, John Updike and the late Richard Yates.
