= The Best American Short Stories 2001 =

2001 short story collection

- Editor: Katrina Kenison and Barbara Kingsolver
- Language: English
- Series: The Best American Short Stories
- Published: 2001
- Publisher: Houghton Mifflin Harcourt
- Media type: Print (hardback & paperback)
- ISBN: 0395926882
- Preceded by: The Best American Short Stories 2000
- Followed by: The Best American Short Stories 2002

The Best American Short Stories 2001, a volume in The Best American Short Stories series, was edited by Katrina Kenison and by guest editor Barbara Kingsolver.

== Short stories included ==
Author	Story	Source
Andrea Barrett	"Servants of the Map"	Salmagundi
Rick Bass	"The Fireman"	The Kenyon Review
Peter Ho Davies	"Think of England"	Ploughshares
Claire Davis	"Labors of the Heart"	Ploughshares
Elizabeth Graver	"The Mourning Door"	Ploughshares
Ha Jin	"After Cowboy Chicken Came to Town"	TriQuarterly
Andrea Lee	"Brothers and Sisters Around the World"	The New Yorker
Rick Moody	"Boys"	Elle
Barbara Klein Moss	"Rug Weaver"	The Georgia Review
Alice Munro	"Post and Beam"	The New Yorker
Peter Orner	"The Raft"	The Atlantic Monthly
Roy Parvin	"Betty Hutton"	Five Points
Nancy Reisman	"Illumination"	Tin House
Jess Row	"The Secrets of Bats"	Ploughshares
Annette Sanford	"Nobody Listens When I Talk"	Descant
Katherine Shonk	"My Mother's Garden"	Tin House
Marisa Silver	"What I Saw From Where I Stood"	The New Yorker
Trevanian	"The Apple Tree"	The Antioch Review
John Updike	"Personal Archeology"	The New Yorker
Dorothy West	"My Baby..."	Connecticut Review
