= The Best American Short Stories 1990 =

1990 short story collection

- Editor: Shannon Ravenel and Richard Ford
- Language: English
- Series: The Best American Short Stories
- Published: 1990
- Publisher: Houghton Mifflin Harcourt
- Media type: Print (hardback & paperback)
- ISBN: 0395515963
- Preceded by: The Best American Short Stories 1989
- Followed by: The Best American Short Stories 1991

The Best American Short Stories 1990, a volume in The Best American Short Stories series, was edited by Shannon Ravenel and by guest editor Richard Ford.

== Reception ==
In a review appearing in Kirkus Reviews the volume was said to include a "fair sampling of what's happening in American fiction today," while also criticizing the editorial choice of stories appearing elsewhere in the same year and the inclusion of two stories each by two writers. In the Publishers Weekly review it was noted that "the volume's prevailing themes [are] of modern angst."

== Short stories included ==
Author	Story	Source
Edward Allen	"River of Toys"	Southwest Review
Richard Bausch	"The Fireman's Wife"	The Atlantic Monthly
Richard Bausch	"A Kind of Simpe, Happy Grace"	Wigwag
Madison Smartt Bell	"Finding Natasha"	Antaeus
C. S. Godshalk	"The Wizard"	The AGNI Review
Patricia Henley	"The Secret of Cartwheels"	The Atlantic Monthly
Pam Houston	"How to Talk to a Hunter"	Quarterly West
Siri Hustvedt	"Mr. Morning"	The Ontario Review
Denis Johnson	"Car Crash While Hitchhiking"	The Paris Review
Dennis McFarland	"Nothing to Ask For"	The New Yorker
Steven Millhauser	"Eisenheim the Illusionist"	Esquire
Lorrie Moore	"You're Ugly, Too"	The New Yorker
Alice Munro	"Differently"	The New Yorker
Alice Munro	"Wigtime"	The New Yorker
Padgett Powell	"Typical"	Grand Street
Lore Segal	"The Reverse Bug"	The New Yorker
Elizabeth Tallent	"Prowler"	The New Yorker
Christopher Tilghman	"In a Father's Place"	Ploughshares
Joan Wickersham	"Commuter Marriage"	The Hudson Review
Joy Williams	"The Little Winter"	Granta
