= From Where You Dream =

Book by Robert Olen Butler

- First edition
- Editor: Janet Burroway
- Author: Robert Olen Butler
- Language: English
- Genre: Non-fiction
- Publisher: Grove/Atlantic
- Publication date: 2005
- ISBN: 0-8021-4257-5

From Where You Dream: The Process of Writing Fiction is a collection of essays by Robert Olen Butler, based on lectures given as part of his creative writing class. It is edited and introduced by Janet Burroway, a graduate of the class.

The book focuses on the creative process rather than on writing techniques. It emphasizes the importance of dreamspace or unconscious writing, of the senses and sense memories, and of yearning. It focuses on literary fiction rather than commercial and analyses a number of works, including pointing out faults in Butler's own works.

The book is divided into three main sections, "The Lecture", "The Workshop", and "The Stories Analyzed".

It includes advice on how student writers can access the unconscious, including the technique of "dreamstorming": "A writer watches his character and floats around the dreamy milieu of his novel and identifies potential scenes. He jots down a few sensual details about each scene on a 3×5 index card. Then he arranges the cards in sequence and finally begins to write the scenes."

== Reception ==
Publishers Weekly noted similarities to Method acting and concluded "Butler shares his insights into—and passion for—the creation and experience of fiction with total openness, and seriously aspiring writers should receive this text/manifesto in the same light."

The Seattle Times said that while writers "will probably feel reluctant to completely embrace Butler’s principles, they’ll surely find many useful concepts scattered throughout his book".
