= The Train to Lo Wu =

2005 short story collection by Jess Row

- Author: Jess Row
- Language: English
- Genre: Short story collection
- Publisher: Dell Publishing
- Publication date: January 2005
- Publication place: Hong Kong
- Media type: Print
- Pages: 208 pp
- ISBN: 978-0-385-33789-2
- OCLC: 56387392
- Dewey Decimal: 813/.6 22
- LC Class: PS3618.O87255 T73 2005

The Train to Lo Wu is a collection of short stories by Jess Row published in January 2005. The book contains seven loosely related stories set in or related to Hong Kong. They all deal with the tension felt between insiders and outsiders, especially between locals and foreigners visiting for study or work.

== The stories ==
=== "The Secret of Bats" ===
Alice, a young English student, experiments with echolocation as a means to dealing with her mother's suicide, which attracts her confused and alienated American English teacher. She shares with her teacher a fragmented and strangely eloquent journal about her attempts at echolocation, which becomes a consuming personal project. The story ends on her apartment's rooftop, as Alice and the teacher embrace.

Characters: Alice Leung: sixteen-year-old Chinese student who looks 12; tall girl, narrow face, pinched around the mouth, her cheeks pitted with acne scars. She pretends she is a bat, wandering around in a blindfold, trying to gain a bat's sense of orientation. She wants to show her teacher how it works to prove it to him. Unpopular; other girls ignore her and she keeps to herself. She experiments with echolocation as a means to dealing with her mother’s suicide. Alice’s mom: committed suicide. The reason Alice wants to act like a bat—so she can communicate with her mom Narrator: American teacher in Hong Kong. Becomes engulfed in the Chinese lifestyle (on the bus when an old woman gives him money for the New Year he says he has forgotten what America was like). He is a good, genuine person who wants the best for his students (stays after school for Alice’s experiments). Caring and optimistic (goes to visit Alice at her house when she invites him)

=== "The American Girl" ===
A young woman, a student from Oklahoma, visits a blind masseur regularly in order to pry from him information about his boyhood during the Cultural Revolution. Through the course of the story, what one first assumes is a friendship between the young woman and old man, is in fact a case of cultural misunderstanding, the American believing that telling his traumatic story would be healthy for the old man, and the Chinese man trying to avoid what he perceives as her invasive interrogation.

=== "The Train to Lo Wu" ===
A Hong Kong resident and businessman, Harvey, is drawn to a girl named Lin who lives in Shenzhen but comes from the rural province of Anhui. As they date and eventually become lovers, she expresses her desperate wish to remain on equal footing with him, despite the disparity in their incomes. In the end, Harvey is not able to fully understand her concerns and their relationship is not able to overcome cultural and social obstacles.

=== "For You" ===
An American photographer, Lewis, moves with his wife Melinda when her Boston-based company posts her in Hong Kong. Her new job forces her to work longer hours and offers fewer benefits. Unable to adjust to their new life, he retreats at her urging to a Zen monastery in South Korea. After some time, he finally realizes that in order to save his marriage, he has to tell his wife he cannot handle living in Hong Kong, and risks the possibility of divorce.

=== "The Ferry" ===
An African-American lawyer, Marcel Thomas, must tell another African-American working for his company, who is based in Hong Kong, that he is being fired. As the story unfolds, it becomes clear that while racism is involved, no one party is completely innocent of wrongdoing, as the Hong Kong businessman, Wallace Ford, admits to participating in illegal activities at the behest of the company. In return for Wallace's silence about such actions, he receives a very generous retirement package. Throughout his stay, Marcel must endure attention because of his race, but in the closing scene feels grateful that he is "gwai lo" in Cantonese, or "ghost", and in a sense invisible. (note that the correct here should be huckgwei)

=== "Heaven Lake" ===
A Chinese man in Hong Kong is raising his two daughters, twelve and sixteen, after the death of their mother six years before. The distance between them causes him to reflect on his early days in New York City, when he worked as a deliveryman for a Chinese restaurant for very little money while studying at Columbia University on a scholarship. One late night, he received a call for a large order in a dangerous part of the city, and upon delivery was mugged. The mugger is a man desperate for enough money to repay a bookie and escape danger. The young deliveryman ended up letting the mugger face his own danger rather than assisting him, and wonders about the morality of his decision.

=== "Revolutions" ===
An American painter who was thriving in Bangkok, Thailand, breaks a leg and must relocate to Hong Kong. Through his physical therapy at a Zen monastery he comes into contact with Ana, a Polish Buddhist nun. His despair and her compassion draws the two into an intense physical and emotional relationship. As he heals, emotionally and physically, Ana also explores areas that gave her pleasure, like dancing. Once he is well, she leaves him to rejoin the convent, and he continues to paint.

== Reception ==
Kirkus Reviews called the book "an impressive debut from an admirably protean storyteller."

It also received positive reviews from Publishers Weekly.
