= Monkey Bridge =

Novel by Lan Cao

- First edition
- Author: Lan Cao
- Language: English
- Genre: Immigrant, Vietnamese American, war and exile
- Publisher: Viking Press
- Publication date: 1997
- Publication place: United States
- Media type: Print (hardback & paperback)
- Pages: 260
- ISBN: 0-14-026361-6
- OCLC: 39481595

Monkey Bridge, published in 1997, is the debut novel of Vietnamese American attorney and writer Lan Cao, a professor of international law at Chapman University School of Law. In addition to Monkey Bridge, Cao co-authored Everything You Need to Know about Asian American History with Himilce Novas.

== Plot summary ==
Monkey Bridge traverses several opposing worlds. The novel consists of two narrators: Mai, a teenage Vietnamese immigrant, who flees to the United States on the day of the Fall of Saigon in 1975, and her mother, Thanh, who manages to join Mai a few months after Mai is settled in the U.S.

Three years after their arrival in the United States, Thanh is in the hospital with a blood clot in her brain, suffering paralysis of half side. She has been calling out for Baba Quan, her father, in her sleep. Thanh and Baba Quan were supposed to meet in Saigon and leave for America together back in 1975, but this plan fails because Baba Quan, for some unknown reason, does not show up. Since then, Thanh has "never truly recovered from the mishap that left him without the means to leave Saigon".

Mai, who worries about her mother's health and understands how desperately her mother wants to see Baba Quan, decides to make a dangerous trip to Canada with her best friend Bobbie, where they plan to make a phone call to Baba Quan once they cross the border and hopefully take a wild chance to bring her grandfather to the United States. The plan, however, does not succeed. Mai retreats at the last minute because she not only fears of being deported by the U.S government but also recalls what her father says all the time: "One wrong move ... the entire course of a country changed", in which he refers to America's decision to make the crucial commitment in the Vietnam War.

Thanh is discharged by the hospital and decides to temporarily leave her Vietnam past behind so she can move on. She becomes socially active again in the Vietnamese American community, Little Saigon. Meanwhile, Mai, idling around at home in the summer before attending college, gets very curious about her mysterious grandfather and starts to pry into things about Baba Quan from her mother and different acquaintances, such as Mrs. Bay, Thanh's best friend, and Uncle Michael, a Vietnam veteran who befriended her father and brought her to the United States when Saigon fell. After several attempts, Mai still fails to learn anything specific about Baba Quan; all they would tell her are some basic facts and superficial comments. She also fails to convince Uncle Michael to help her grandfather relocate in the United States.

Wanting to know more about her mother's and Baba Quan's Vietnam past—"the vivid details that accompanied every fault and fracture, every movement and shift that had forced her apart and at the same time kept her stitched together", Mai sneaks in her mother's room and steals the letters that her mother has kept writing her, but has not let her read them yet. From her mother's secret letters, Mai finally learns the unspoken family history that Thanh has been avoiding telling her and the reason why Baba Quan did not show up at their escape.

Unable to maintain his rental payments, Baba Quan, whom Thanh once believed to be her father, prostitutes his wife to his rich landlord, Uncle Khan, whose wife is sterile. Tuyet, Baba Quan's wife, later on has Khan's child, Thanh. From this act, Baba Quan secures his land and gets endless benefits from the rich landlord. The Khan's soon adopt Thanh and send her to a Catholic boarding school. Living with shame and rage, Baba Quan has been planning to get revenge on his landlord by committing murder but never succeeds. Later on, when the war begins, Baba Quan becomes a Vietcong. His village is declared a free-fire zone, and his family is moved away from their ancestral land to a nearby strategic hamlet, while he stays there to keep working with the Vietcong. Thanh's mother dies during the transition. In accordance with Vietnamese ritual, Thanh has to escort her mother's body back to their home village for burial. By a riverbank on her way back home, Thanh witnesses Baba Quan murder his landlord. Struck with panic, Thanh runs away and leaves her mother's body behind. Because Thanh loses her mother's body and fails to perform the proper burial rituals, she is left with a permanent scar and never adjusts to her new life in the US.

== Significant characters ==
Mai: The first narrator of the novel, a teenage immigrant who struggles with being American and remaining Vietnamese.

Thanh: Mai's mother, the second narrator.

Baba Quan: Thanh's father, the mysterious father figure in the novel.

Uncle Michael: the Vietnam War veteran who brings Mai to America.

Aunt Mary: Michael's wife.

Uncle Khan: Baba Quan's rich landlord.

Bobbie: Mai's best friend. She is Mai's positive influence.

Mrs. Bay: Thanh's best friend.

== Themes ==
Gender roles in traditional Vietnamese society: From Thanh's narrative, we learn that she has to give up all her fancy education in order to be a perfect wife, as her mother-in-law calls her. On the other hand, even though Baba Quan prostitutes his wife to his landlord, becomes a Vietcong, and eventually murders his landlord, Thanh and Uncle Michael still try to protect his vulnerable father figure by making up lies, because the Vietnamese believe that men are supposed to take care of their families by all means and women are to sacrifice.

Language and authority: Language, in this novel, appears in two opposite forms: the barrier of language and the power of language. In Thanh's secret letters to her daughter, she writes that Mai is ashamed of her because she speaks English with an accent, even though she speaks perfect Vietnamese and French. On the other hand, Mai finds her power from "the gift of language":

Inside my new tongue, my real tongue, was an astonishing new power. For my mother and her Vietnamese neighbors, I became the keeper of the word, the only one with access to the light-world. Like Adam, I had the God-given right to name all the fowls of the air and all the beasts of the field. The right to name, I quickly discover, also meant the right to stand guard over language and the right to claim unadulterated authority.

The generation gap: Because of the cultural differences and language barriers, the generation gap in immigrant families has become the most crucial factor that distance the parents and the children. Mai admits that her mother "dies in her mind" because she is "imperfect and unable to adjust". A role shift between two generations hence appears. As critic David Cowart writes, "Mai sees the elder immigrants as adolescents, and her mother is undramatically transformed from mother to child".

Exile and nostalgia: When the Little Saigon members get together, the only thing they talk about is Vietnam. Deep in their hearts, they still believe that the communist government will eventually fall apart, and they can all go home then.

== Reception ==
In a largely positive review, Michiko Kakutani of The New York Times concluded that the author had "not only made an impressive debut, but also joined writers like Salman Rushdie and Bharati Mukherjee in mapping the state of exile and its elusive geography". However, she cited the melodramatic revellations as "far from fluent", saying that "incongruous developments and clumsy foreshadowings [make] us suspect that something is afoot long before we're supposed to", but said that the novelist more than made up for this weakness "with her authoritative and subtly nuanced delineation of character and place". In a review for the Chicago Tribune, Andrea Louie said that "Western readers are fortunate to have Cao contribute to the modest body of work that goes beyond wartime and reaches for Vietnam's lush heart", citing Robert Olen Butler's A Good Scent from a Strange Mountain and novels by Dương Thu Hương as some of the few such works available in the US in 1997 when Monkey Bridge was published. Judith Coburn said in The Los Angeles Times that "After early chapters of lyrical and subtle writing, the novel rockets to a close with so many plot developments that it's more like a bodice-ripper than like literary fiction. The voice of the narrator, supposedly Mai's, is too knowing and literary to be a teenager's. And her mother's journal is too close to the narrator's densely metaphoric style to ring anything but false."
