= Thom Jones bibliography =

This is a list of stories by the American writer Thom Jones.

Story	Published In	Collected In	Notes
40, Still at Home	N/A	Sonny Liston Was a Friend of Mine	
A Merry Little Christmas	N/A	Night Train	
A Midnight Clear	Playboy	Sonny Liston Was a Friend of Mine	
A Run Through the Jungle	N/A	Sonny Liston Was a Friend of Mine	
A White Horse	The New Yorker	The Pugilist at Rest	
All Along the Watchtower	Playboy	Night Train	
As of July 6, I Am Responsible for No Debts Other Than My Own	Buzz	The Pugilist at Rest	
Bomb Shelter Noel	Playboy	Night Train	
Break on Through	N/A	The Pugilist at Rest	
Brother Dodo's Revenge	F&SF	N/A	First Published Story
Cannonball: Love Sinks	The Washington Post	N/A	
Cold Snap	The New Yorker	Cold Snap	Best American Short Story 1994
Daddy's Girl	Harper's	Sonny Liston Was a Friend of Mine	
Diary of My Health	N/A	Night Train	
Dynamite Hands	Playboy	Cold Snap	
Easter Island Noodles Almondine	Granta	N/A	
Fields of Purple Forever	GQ	Sonny Liston Was a Friend of Mine	
I Love You, Sophie Western	Nerve	Sonny Liston Was a Friend of Mine	
I Need a Man to Love Me	Harper's	Cold Snap	Published as "Nights in White Satin"
I Want to Live!	Harper's	The Pugilist at Rest	Best American Short Stories 1993 and Best American Short Stories of the Century
Mosquitoes	Story (magazine)	The Pugilist at Rest	
Mouses	The New Yorker	Sonny Liston Was a Friend of Mine	
My Heroic, Mythic Journey	Story	Sonny Liston Was a Friend of Mine	
Night Train	Tin House	Night Train	Best American Nonrequired Reading 2004
Ooh Baby Baby	Esquire (magazine)	Cold Snap	
Pickpocket	Playboy	Cold Snap	
Pot Shack	Buzz	Cold Snap	
Powder	Playboy	N/A	
Quicksand	Playboy	Cold Snap	
Rocket Man	Mississippi Review	The Pugilist at Rest	
Rocketfire Red	N/A	Cold Snap	
Silhouettes	N/A	The Pugilist at Rest	
Sonny Liston Was a Friend of Mine	The New Yorker	Sonny Liston Was a Friend of Mine	O. Henry Award Winner, 1993
Superman, My Son	The New Yorker	Cold Snap	
Tarantula	Zoetrope: All-Story	Sonny Liston Was a Friend of Mine	O. Henry Award Short List 1998
The Black Lights	The New Yorker	The Pugilist at Rest	
The Junkman of Chengdu	?	Night Train	
The Pugilist at Rest	The New Yorker	The Pugilist at Rest	Best American Short Stories 1992
The Roadrunner	N/A	Sonny Liston Was a Friend of Mine	
Unchain My Heart	N/A	The Pugilist at Rest	
Way Down Deep in the Jungle	The New Yorker	Cold Snap	Best American Short Stories 1995
Wipeout	Esquire	The Pugilist at Rest	
You Cheated, You Lied	N/A	Sonny Liston Was a Friend of Mine	
