= Mitchell A. Wilson =

American novelist (1913–1973)

- Born: July 17, 1913; New York City, U.S.
- Died: February 25, 1973 (aged 59)
- Occupations: Novelist; physicist
- Spouse(s): Helen Weinberg Wilson; Stella Adler
- Children: 2, including Victoria
- Writing career
- Pen name: Emmett Hogarth

Mitchell A. Wilson (July 17, 1913 – February 25, 1973) was an American novelist and physicist.

== Life and career ==
Before becoming a writer, Wilson was a research scientist (for a time as an assistant to Enrico Fermi) and instructor in physics at the university level. Science, invention, and the ethical problems of modern atomic science are the subjects for some of his works. He also wrote non-fiction on scientific matters for the general reader.

At the height of the Cold War, he was considered a major novelist in the Soviet Union, while his work received little recognition in the United States.

His novels include Live with Lightning, Meeting at a Far Meridian, and My Brother, My Enemy. A 1945 novel None So Blind was adapted for the 1947 film The Woman on the Beach directed by Jean Renoir. His non-fiction includes American science and Invention, a Pictorial History and Passion to Know. At the start of his career, he collaborated on a mystery novel The Goose is Cooked with Abraham Polonsky, written under the joint pseudonym of Emmett Hogarth.

At the time of his death, Wilson was married to acting coach Stella Adler. His first marriage was to Helen Weinberg Wilson which produced two daughters: Erica Silverman, a literary agent, and Victoria Wilson, editor and publisher at Alfred A. Knopf.

== Books ==
=== Non-fiction ===
- American Science and Invention: A Pictorial History (1954)
- The Human Body: What It Is and How It Works(1959)
- The Body in Action: The Parts of the Body and How They Work (1962)
- Energy (1963) (Series: LIFE Science Library)
- Passion to know: The scientists of today's world, who they are, what they are doing, and why! (1972)

=== Fiction ===
- The Goose is Cooked (1940)
- Footsteps Behind Her (1942)
- Stalk the Hunter (1945)
- None So Blind (1945)
- The Panic Stricken (1946)
- Live With Lightning (1949)
- My Brother, My Enemy (1952)
- The Lovers (1954)
- Meeting at a Far Meridian (1961)
- The Huntress (1966)

== Sources ==
- Oxford Companion to American Literature
- American National Biography
