= Jason Brown (writer) =

American writer

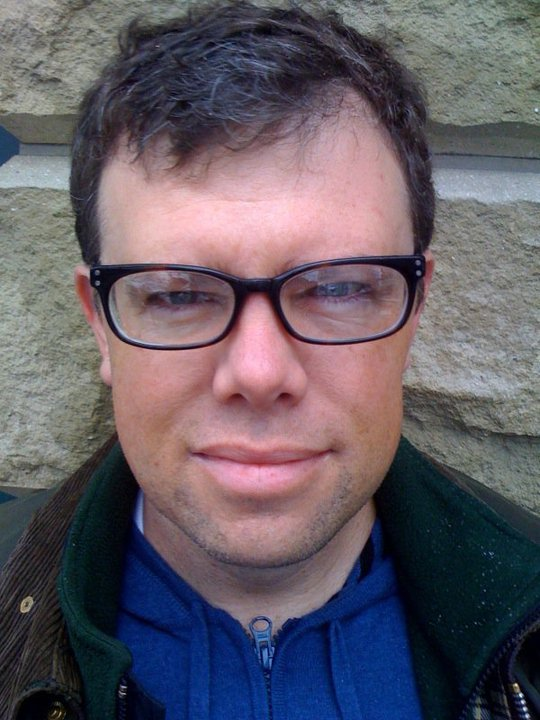
- Education: Cornell University (MFA)
- Occupations: Writer, teacher
- Writing career
- Genre: Fiction, Nonfiction, Screenplays
- Notable works: Driving the Heart (1999); Why the Devil Chose New England for His Work (2007); A Faithful But Melancholy Account of Several Barbarities Lately Committed (2019); Outermark (2024); Character Witness (2025)
- Website: www.writerjasonbrooksbrown.com

Jason Brown is an American writer of fiction, nonfiction and screenplays who writes primarily about Maine and New England. His work has appeared in magazines and anthologies including The New Yorker, Harper's, The Atlantic ,The Best American Short Stories, The Best American Essays, and The Pushcart Prize Anthology.

== Early life and education ==
Brown grew up in Maine. He earned an MFA in creative writing from Cornell University and received a Stegner Fellowship to study creative writing at Stanford University.

== Career ==
=== Driving the Heart ===
After its initial publication in the Mississippi Review, the title story for his first collection, "Driving the Heart," was selected for The Best American Short Stories 1996. The story later appeared in the 2012 collection Boston Noir 2: The Classics.

In 1999, Brown's debut collection was published. The New York Times described Driving the Heart and Other Stories as "bleak yet penetrating," adding that "each of Brown's elegant stories echoes with the same quiet despair." The 13 stories are mostly set in and around Portland, Maine, involving characters affected by tragic experiences past and present. Driving the Heart was a starred review in Publishers Weekly, where it was called an "extraordinary debut collection."

=== Why the Devil Chose New England for His Work ===
Brown's second collection of 11 loosely linked short stories, Why the Devil Chose New England for His Work: Stories, came out in 2007. The 11 stories set in the fictional town of Vaughn in central Maine are linked by geography and tone, with "weary, complicated souls" of all ages. With the changes in narrative point of view within some of the stories, Brown has said he was influenced by the narration in the films of Terrence Malick – Days of Heaven and The Thin Red Line in particular. Some of the stories were originally published in magazines including Harper's, Epoch, Open City and The Atlantic. The book was given an A− by Entertainment Weekly, and was a starred review in Publishers Weekly. The Los Angeles Times called it "an exceptionally beautiful and devastating book." It was a suggested summer reading by NPR in 2009. The New Yorker said, "The narrators of Brown’s second book of stories are mostly watchers—witnesses to sordid events in the fictional town of Vaughn, Maine. Through their eyes, the familiar routines of small-town life are transmogrified into emblematic ugliness. Some of the stories deal with Maine’s twin preoccupations with boats and lumber, but the strongest anatomize the town with stunning emotional precision."

Three of Brown's stories were named among the Best American Short Stories series "100 Other Distinguished Stories" in 1997, 2005 and 2010. His story "Wintering Over" was published in The Southern Review in 2012.

=== A Faithful But Melancholy Account of Several Barbarities Lately Committed ===
Brown's third collection of stories, a novel in stories, chronicles the comic misfortunes of the Howland family of Maine published in October 2019 in a short fiction series created by Missouri Review Books. Stories from the book appeared in Best American Short Stories and the Pushcart Prize Anthology. The book won the Maine Book Award for fiction. The book received favorable reviews in The Boston Globe and other venues .

=== Outermark ===
Outermark, a novel in stories, chronicles the history of a fictional island thirty miles off the Maine coast and was published by Paul Dry Books/Ingram in 2024. The book received favorable reviews in the Wall Street Journal and other venu es.

=== Character Witness ===
Character Witness, a memoir, will be published in September 2025 as part of the American Lives Series, edited by Tobias Wolff, at the University of Nebraska Press. The first part of the book, "The Wrong Jason Brown," appeared in The New Yorker and Best American Essays. The book was short-listed for the Yale Nonfiction Book Prize.

The Wrong Jason Brown The New Yorker

=== Film ===
Rule Breakers, a film that fictionalizes the journey of the Afghan Girls Robotics Team, is a feature-length film co-written with Bill Guttentag and Elaha Mahboob and was produced by Parallax Films, Slingshot Productions, and Shape Pictures and was distributed to over 2100 theaters across the United States by Angel Studies in March 2025. The film appeared on Amazon Prime in the spring of 2025 and was distributed in over 25 countries worldwide. Jason was also an executive producer on the film along with Roya Mahboob, the subject of the bio picture, Elizabeth Brown, and others. The film was reviewed favorably in Variety, The Hollywood Reporter, the New York Times and many other venues. It was also screened at the United Nations, Stanford, Yale, Princeton, the Doha Forum, and many other places.

=== Teaching ===
Brown previously taught creative writing at Stanford University as a Jones lecturer, and at the University of Arizona's creative writing MFA program. He is currently a professor at the University of Oregon where he serves as director of the creative writing MFA program.

== Honors and awards (selected) ==
- Best American Essays, 2022, for "The Wrong Jason Brown"
- Maine Literary Award for A Faithful But Melancholy Account of Several Barbarities Lately Committed
- Best American Short Stories, 2020, for "A Faithful But Melancholy Account of Several Barbarities Lately Committed"
- 2019 Pushcart Prize XLIV
- NPR summer pick for Why the Devil Chose New England For His Work.
- Best American Short Stories 1996 pick for "Driving the Heart"
- Jeffrey E Smith Editor's Prize from the Missouri Review, 2017
- Stegner Fellowship in Fiction, Stanford University, 1996-98
- MacDowell Colony Fellowship, 2002
- Corporation of Yaddo Fellowship, 2002
- Pushcart Prize special mention for "Why the Devil Chose New England For His Work", 2009
- Glenna Lusche Award for "Flood", 2009
- Mississippi Review Fiction Prize for "Driving the Heart," 1995
- Saltonstall Foundation Grant

== Bibliography ==
=== Books ===
- Driving the Heart and Other Stories (W. W. Norton & Company, 1999)
- Why the Devil Chose New England for His Work: Stories (Open City/Grove Atlantic, 2007)
- A Faithful But Melancholy Account of Several Barbarities Lately Committed: A Novel in Stories (Missouri Review Books, Oct, 2019)
- Outermark: A Novel (Paul Dry Books/Ingram, 2024)
- Character Witness: A Memoir (American Lives Series, Tobias Wolff editor, 2025)

=== Stories (selected) ===
- "The Last Voyage of the Alice B Toklas" – The Pushcart Anthology XLIV
- "Driving the Heart" – The Best American Short Stories 1996 (ed. John Edgar Wideman, Houghton Mifflin, 1996); Boston Noir 2: The Classics (ed. Dennis Lehane, Mary Cotton and Jaime Clarke, Akashic Books, 2012)
- "Afternoon of the Sassanoa" – The Atlantic (April 1999)
- "She" – Harper's (March 2001)
- "A Faithful But Melancholy Account of Several Barbarities Lately Committed" – Sewanee Review (2019)
- "North" – Open City (Issue 19, June 2003)
- "Instructions to the Living from the Condition of the Dead" – Missouri Review (2017)
- "Dark Room" – StoryQuarterly (Issue 42, 2006)
- "Life During Peacetime". TriQuarterly. March 22, 2006. Archived from the original on March 29, 2015 – via HighBeam Research.
- "The last Voyage of the Alice B. Toklas" – Missouri Review (2018)
- "Why the Devil Chose New England for His Work" – Epoch (2007)
- "Wintering Over" – The Southern Review (Winter 2012)

=== Articles and Essays (selected) ===
- "The Wrong Jason Brown," The New Yorker, 2021
- "If I did not Protest, no one would" – Salon, August 2015
- "Digital Literacy For Women and Girls in Afghanistan" – Salon, May 2015
- "If I Teach Them, No One Can Stop Them" – Salon, February 2015
- "One Girl Can Be Silenced, But A Nation Of Girls Telling Their Stories Becomes Free" – Salon, February 2015
