= Laura Glen Louis =

American poet

Laura Glen Louis is an American author, poet, and essayist. Her work has appeared in Ploughshares, Michigan Quarterly Review, Columbia Poetry Review, AGNI Online, American Short Fiction, and Nimrod, and has been anthologized in Best American Short Stories. Her collection, Talking in the Dark (Harcourt, 2001) a Barnes & Noble Discover book, and San Francisco Chronicle Bestseller, was named by Detroit Free Press as one of the eight best books of 2001. Born in Macao, Louis graduated from the University of California, Berkeley. She lives in California.

== Bibliography ==
- Talking in the Dark, Harcourt, Inc. 2001 ISBN 0151005222, ppb ISBN 0156007657
- Some, like elephants, El León Literary Arts, 2010 ISBN 978-0-9795285-4-5

== Anthologies ==
- Best American Short Stories, 1994 Tobias Wolff and Katrina Kennison, editors

== Awards and honors ==
- Barnes & Noble Discover book, Talking in the Dark, 2001
- Katherine Anne Porter Prize, Nimrod Literary Journal 1990
