= Jess Row =

American short story writer, novelist, and professor

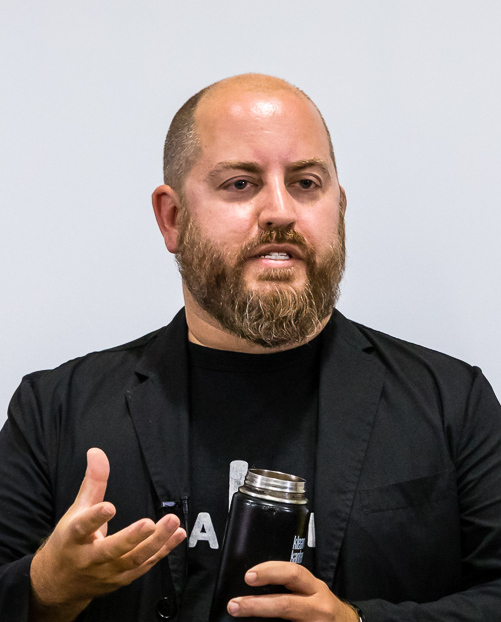
- Row in 2019
- Born: October 25, 1974 (age 51); Washington, D.C., U.S.
- Education: B.A., Yale University (1997); M.F.A., University of Michigan (2001)
- Occupations: Writer; professor; literary critic
- Writing career
- Genre: American literature

Jess Row (born 1974 in Washington, D.C.) is an American short story writer, novelist, and professor.

== Early life ==
He received a B.A. in English from Yale University in 1997. He later taught English in Hong Kong for two years. He completed his Master of Fine Arts in creative writing at the University of Michigan in 2001.

== Career ==
His debut novel Your Face in Mine (Riverhead, 2014) explored racial reassignment surgery against the backdrop of post-industrial Baltimore.

His stories have appeared in various publications, including The New Yorker, Harvard Review, Ploughshares, Granta, Witness, The Atlantic, Kyoto Journal and the Best American Short Stories of 2001 and 2003.

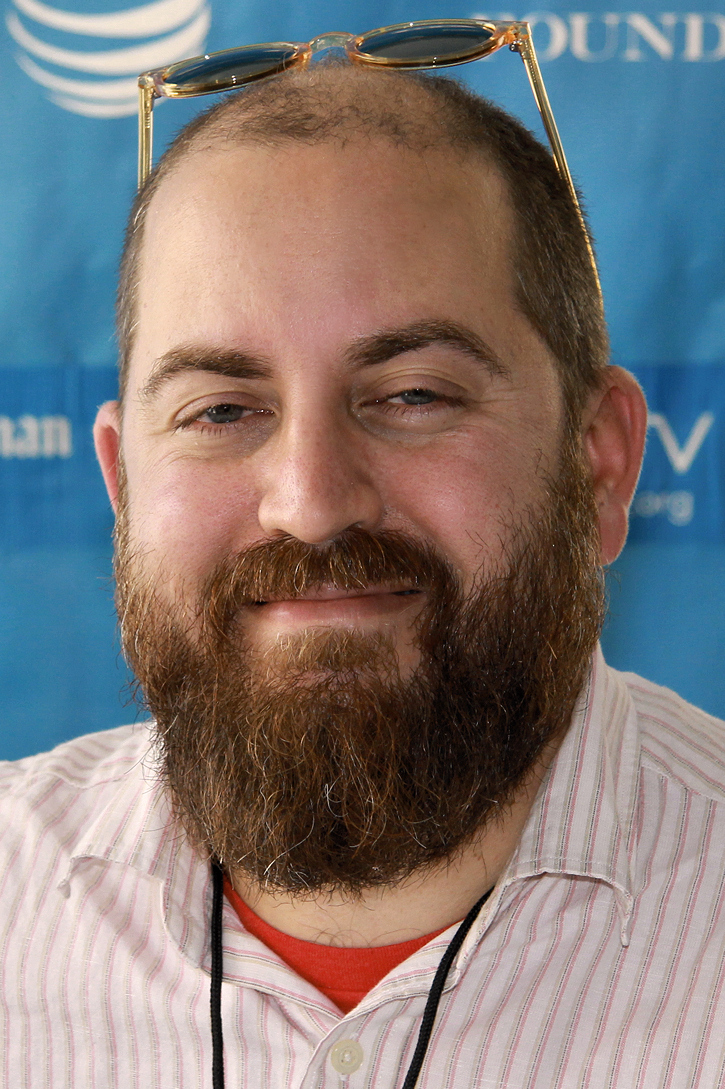
Row at the Texas Book Festival in Austin, Texas in 2014

He was an associate professor of English at The College of New Jersey and as of 2021 teaches at New York University as a professor of English and used to teach in the Writing Program at Vermont College of Fine Arts. He is also a teacher and student of Zen Buddhism.

== Awards ==
He has received many awards for his fiction, among them a Whiting Award, a Pushcart Prize, and a fellowship from the National Endowment for the Arts. In 2018, he received a Whiting Creative Nonfiction Grant to complete his book White Flights: Race, Fiction and the American Imagination. Most notably, Professor Row won the Guggenheim Fellowship.

== Personal life ==
He currently resides in New York City with his wife Sonya Posmentier and his two children.

== Works ==
=== Books ===
- The Train to Lo Wu. The Dial Press. 2005. ISBN 978-0-38533-789-2.
  - "Heaven Lake," Reprinted from Harvard Review 22, Spring 2002
- Nobody Ever Gets Lost. FiveChapters Books. 2011. ISBN 978-0-98293-922-2.
- Your Face In Mine. Riverhead Books. 2014. ISBN 978-1-59448-834-4.
- White Flights: Race, Fiction, and the American Imagination. Graywolf Press. 2019. ISBN 978-1555978327.
- The New Earth. HyperCollins books. 2023. ISBN 978-0-06-240065-9.

=== Short stories ===
- "The Answer". Granta (97: Best of Young American Novelists 2). Spring 2007.
- "Amritsar". The Atlantic. Fiction Issue. 2008.
- "The Call of Blood". Harvard Review. 38. Harvard University. Spring 2010.
- "The World in Flames". FiveChapters. 2011. Archived from the original on 24 September 2015.

=== Articles and essays ===
- "Portrait of My Father". Granta. 2009.
- "A Confession". Granta (128: American Wild). Autumn 2013. (Subscription Required)
