= Kate Wheeler (novelist) =

American novelist and meditation teacher (born 1955)

- Born: 1955 (age 70–71); Oklahoma
- Education: Stanford University; Rice University
- Occupations: Novelist; meditation teacher
- Writing career
- Notable awards: O. Henry Award 1982 La Victoire; Pushcart Prize 1983 Judgment; O. Henry Award 1993 Improving My Average; Whiting Awards 1994; Guggenheim Fellowship 1998

Kate Wheeler (born 1955 Oklahoma) is an American novelist and meditation teacher. Since 2016, she has served as the coordinator of the Meditation Retreat Teacher Training Program at the Spirit Rock Meditation Center in Woodacre, California, where she trains senior students to be empowered as teachers. She also is a practicing Buddhist teacher and instructor who offers retreats, talks, and personal guidance to communities and individuals. Wheeler received a Pushcart Prize as well as two O. Henry Awards.

== Life ==
She was raised in various parts of South America. She graduated from Rice University, and Stanford University. She was ordained a Buddhist nun in Burma. She teaches at Southwest Texas State University. She was a panelist at the Key West Literary Seminar.

She is married and lives in Somerville, Massachusetts.

== Awards ==
- 1981 Second prize, Xerox-Atlantic Monthly American Short Story Contest
- 1982 O. Henry Awards, for La Victoire
- 1983 Pushcart Prize, for Judgment
- 1992 The Best American Short Stories 1992
- 1993 O. Henry Awards, for Improving My Average
- 1993 PEN/Faulkner runner-up
- 1994 Whiting Award
- 1994 NEA Fellowship
- 1996 Twenty best novelists under 40 in US, Granta
- 1997 Best of Outside: The First 20 Years
- 1998 Guggenheim Fellowship
- 1999 Somerville Arts Council Grant
- 2002 The Best American Travel Writing
- 2008 The Best Women's Travel Writing
- 2008 The Best Buddhist Writing
- 2008 Radcliffe Institute Fellow

== Works ==
- Not Where I Started From. Houghton Mifflin Harcourt. 1997. ISBN 978-0-395-86032-8.
- When Mountains Walked. Houghton Mifflin Harcourt. 2001. ISBN 978-0-618-12701-6. "Kate Wheeler (novelist)."

=== Editors ===
- Kate Wheeler, ed. (2004). Nixon under the bodhi tree and other works of Buddhist fiction. Wisdom Publications. ISBN 978-0-86171-354-7.

=== Anthologies ===
- "Contemporary Fiction: Granta's Best of the Young American Novelists " 1996
- C. Michael Curtis, ed. (2003). Faith: stories. Houghton Mifflin Harcourt. ISBN 978-0-618-37824-1.
- William Miller Abrahams, ed. (1982). Prize Stories 1982: The O. Henry Awards. Doubleday. ISBN 978-0-385-17563-0.
- Robert Stone; Katrina Kenison, eds. (1992). The best American short stories. Houghton Mifflin. ISBN 978-0-395-59304-2.
- Frances Mayes; Jason Wilson, eds. (2002). The Best American Travel Writing 2002. Houghton Mifflin Harcourt. ISBN 978-0-618-11880-9.
- Lucy McCauley, ed. (2008). "Cave with a View". The Best Women's Travel Writing 2008: True Stories from Around the World. Travelers' Tales. ISBN 978-1-932361-55-1.
