= The Alleys of Eden =

- Cover image
- Author: Robert Olen Butler
- Language: English
- Published: 1981
- Publication place: United States
- Media type: Print (hardback & paperback)
- Pages: 251 pp
- ISBN: 0749396385 (paperback)
- OCLC: 7958792
- Dewey Decimal: 811.54
- LC Class: PS3552.U8278
- Followed by: Sun Dogs (1982)

The Alleys of Eden is the first published novel of Pulitzer Prize winning author Robert Olen Butler, first published in 1981.

== Synopsis ==
Set in Saigon during the final days of the Vietnam War and the buildup to the American evacuation, the story revolves around Clifford Wilkes, the last U.S. Army deserter remaining in Saigon and his Vietnamese girlfriend Lanh, a former prostitute. The soldier has spent the last five years hiding in his lover's small room in one of the countless back alleys of that sprawling city, afraid to venture far in case he is captured by his countrymen. During that time the couple have become far more than lovers, having gradually built a unique level of trust and understanding. As the end of the conflict becomes inevitable, Wilkes must face his fears and claim a place for himself and Lanh on one of the last helicopters to leave Saigon.

Back in the United States, their relationship slowly flounders and dissolves as Wilkes is drawn back into his own society and Lanh becomes alienated and helpless among her new surroundings and the lack of empathy she encounters in the people around her.
