= The Family Chao =

2022 novel by Lan Samantha Chang

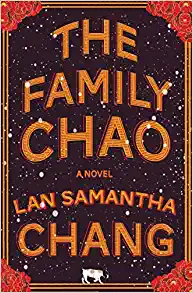
- First edition (US)
- Author: Lan Samantha Chang
- Genre: Mystery, Comedy, Family saga
- Publisher: W. W. Norton (US)
- Publication date: 2022
- Pages: 320
- ISBN: 978-0-393-86807-4
- LC Class: PS3553.H2724 F36

The Family Chao is a 2022 novel by the American novelist Lan Samantha Chang, published by W. W. Norton.

It won the 2023 Anisfield-Wolf Book Award for Fiction. Barack Obama named it on his 2022 Summer Reading List.

== Plot ==
The novel focuses on a Chinese American family of chefs in the fictional town of Haven, Wisconsin, who must reckon with their reputation after the family patriarch, Leo Chao, is murdered. The rest of the family includes Leo's wife Winnie and their three sons: Dagou, Ming, and James.

The book is divided into two sections. The first, titled "They See Themselves," builds up to the demise of Leo Chao. The second, titled "The World Sees Them," tracks the trial of one of the three sons for the murder.

== Writing and development ==
The Family Chao is Chang's third novel and fourth book of fiction. It follows the novels All Is Forgotten, Nothing is Lost (2010) and Inheritance (2004), and the short story collection Hunger (1998). There was a conscious 12-year gap before she published The Family Chao.

Chang, who is the first female and first Asian American director of the Iowa Writers' Workshop, has said that her first three books "fit the acceptable stereotype of the quietly suffering Chinese American family," even though she "actually grew up in a noisy Chinese American family." The Family Chao, she has said, is her first time writing in a "candid" way. The Chao family at the center of the book is not based on hers but is in some ways closer to hers than those in the previous books.

She has said that the book is a homage to Fyodor Dostoevsky's The Brothers Karamazov.

The fictional town of the novel is not to be confused with the real town of Haven, Wisconsin.

== Reception and accolades ==
=== Critical reception ===
The Family Chao was released to critical acclaim in the US.

Publishers Weekly called it "ingenious and cunning," concluding that, "For Chang, this marks a triumphant return." The Guardian praised "the way the novel dramatises the gap between how a family wants to be seen, and its messier inner realities," terming it "a wonderful comedy of American consumption." NPR wrote that it is "a riveting character-driven novel that delves beautifully into human psychology." The Star Tribune described it as "operatic and subversive, a playful literary romp with a serious heart."

The Asian Review of Books wrote: "Chang's debt to the original Dostoevsky story is largely limited to the characterization of the brothers and their overbearing father. She uses the Wisconsin backdrop—the state where she was born and raised—to discuss race and identity in America, all while balancing her story with humorous and absurd scenes, including the play on words with the family name, as in Fine Chao, the name of their restaurant."

=== Awards ===
In 2023, the novel was announced joint winner of the Anisfield-Wolf Book Award for Fiction, alongside Geraldine Brooks' Horse. It was long-listed for the Joyce Carol Oates Literary Prize.

It was named a Best Book of the Year by Vogue and NPR, a Kirkus Reviews Favorite Fiction of 2022 Selection, the Barnes & Noble Book Club Selection for February 2022, and a Washington Post Best Audiobook of 2022.
