= Lan Cao =

American writer (born 1961)

- Born: 1961 (age 64–65); Saigon, South Vietnam
- Occupations: Author, professor
- Writing career
- Notable works: Monkey Bridge; The Lotus and the Storm

Lan Cao (born 1961) is a Vietnamese American professor and author. She wrote her debut novel Monkey Bridge in 1997, and her second novel, The Lotus and the Storm, in 2014. She is a professor of law at the Chapman University School of Law, specializing in international business and trade, international law, and development. She received her Juris Doctor from Yale Law School. She has taught at Brooklyn Law School, Duke Law School, Michigan Law School and William & Mary Law School.

== Early life ==
She was born in Saigon, South Vietnam and grew up in Saigon's twin city, Cholon. In 1975, when communist forces defeated South Vietnam, she was flown out of Vietnam. She lived in Avon, Connecticut, with a close family friend, an American colonel, later promoted to Major General, and his wife. Cao received her B.A. in political science from Mount Holyoke College in 1983 and her J.D. from Yale Law School. After law school graduation, she worked as a litigation and corporate attorney at the NYC law firm Paul, Weiss, Rifkind, Wharton & Garrison. She also clerked for a federal judge, Constance Baker Motley of the Southern District of New York, who was the first African-American woman to argue a case before the U.S. Supreme Court in Meredith v. Fair, where she won James Meredith's effort to be the first black student to attend the University of Mississippi in 1962.

== Monkey Bridge ==
Monkey Bridge is the semi-autobiographical story of a mother and daughter who leave Vietnam to come to the United States. Michiko Kakutani of The New York Times wrote of the novel, "Cao has not only made an impressive debut, but joined authors such as Salman Rushdie and Bharati Mukherjee in mapping the state of exile and its elusive geographies of loss and hope."

Monkey Bridge is part coming-of-age story, part immigration story, part war story and part mother-daughter story set both in Vietnam (Mekong Delta) and the US (Virginia). It is considered to be "the first novel by a Vietnamese American about the war experience and its aftermath". Monkey Bridge has been widely adopted in high schools and colleges, in courses such as AP English, comparative literature, women's studies, Vietnam War studies, and cultural studies.

== The Lotus and the Storm ==
Cao's second novel, The Lotus and the Storm, was published by Viking Press in August 2014. Viking describes the novel as "the first in-depth portrait of the Vietnam War from a Vietnamese-American point of view; it is an intimate, universally human story, epic in scope, about the entwined paths of Americans and Vietnamese. It explores the ways in which love and connection heal trauma; and how the deeper story of war is always one of relationships." As in Monkey Bridge, The Lotus and the Storm deals with disjunction, war, trauma, loss, lives exiled, and the continuing weight of the past on the present.
