= Catherine Brady =

American short story writer

- Education: Hollins College (MA); University of Massachusetts Amherst (MFA)
- Occupation: Short story writer
- Writing career
- Notable awards: Western States Book Award (2000); Flannery O'Connor Award for Short Fiction (2003)

Catherine Brady is an American short story writer.

== Life ==
She graduated from Hollins College with an MA, and from the University of Massachusetts Amherst with an MFA. She was on the board, served as Vice-President and President of the Association of Writers & Writing Programs. She teaches at the University of San Francisco.

Her work appeared in Other Voices, Kenyon Review, The Missouri Review.

== Awards ==
- 2003 Flannery O'Connor Award for Short Fiction
- 2000 Western States Book Award in Fiction.

== Works ==
- The Mechanics of Falling. University of Nevada Press. 2009. ISBN 978-0-87417-763-3.
- Elizabeth Blackburn and the story of telomeres: deciphering the ends of DNA. MIT Press. 2007. ISBN 978-0-262-02622-2.
- Curled in the Bed of Love. University of Georgia Press. 2003. ISBN 978-0-8203-2545-3. "Catherine Brady."
- The End of the Class War. CALYX Books. 1999. ISBN 978-0-934971-66-9. "Catherine Brady."

=== Anthologies ===
- Katrina Kenison; Lorrie Moore, eds. (October 14, 2004). The Best American Short Stories 2004. Houghton Mifflin. ISBN 978-0-618-19735-4.
