= Kathleen Hirsch =

American author (born 1953)

- Born: June 1, 1953 (age 73)
- Education: Mount Holyoke (BA); Brown University (MFA)
- Occupation: Author

Kathleen Hirsch (born June 1, 1953) is an American author.

Hirsch received her B.A. in political science and English in 1975 at Mount Holyoke College and her M.F.A in fiction writing from Brown University in 1979. She joined the staff of The Boston Phoenix in 1983, reporting on Boston's subcultures and marginal populations. She profiled two homeless women in a book, "Songs from the Alley."

She has taught writing at Boston College, Harvard University, Wellesley College, and Brown University. She is a contributor to the Boston Globe's Catholic news site, Crux.

== Works ==
- 2001: A Sabbath Life: A Woman's Search for Wholeness (ISBN 978-0385412773)
- 1998: A Home in the Heart of a City: A Woman's Search for Community (ISBN 978-0374280796)
- 1997: "Mothers: Twenty Stories of Contemporary Motherhood" - co-editor with Katrina Kenison (ISBN 978-0865475113)
- 1989: Songs from the Alley (ISBN 978-0385412773)
