= A Good Scent from a Strange Mountain =

1992 book by Robert Olen Butler

A Good Scent From a Strange Mountain
- First edition cover
- Author: Robert Olen Butler
- Cover artist: Jacket illustration by Neil Flewellen; Jacket design by Carin Goldberg
- Language: English
- Genre: Short story collection
- Published: 1992
- Publisher: Henry Holt
- Publication place: United States
- Media type: Print (hardback & paperback)
- Pages: 249 (first edition, hardback)
- ISBN: 0-8050-1986-3 (first edition, hardback)
- OCLC: 24285600
- Dewey Decimal: 813/.54 20
- LC Class: PS3552.U8278 G66 1992

A Good Scent from a Strange Mountain is a 1992 collection of short stories by American writer Robert Olen Butler. It received the Pulitzer Prize for Fiction in 1993.

Each story in the collection is narrated by a different Vietnamese immigrant living in the US state of Louisiana. The stories are largely character-driven and center on cultural differences between Vietnam and the United States. Many of the stories were first published in literary journals, and the collection was re-released in 2001 with two additional stories, "Salem" and "Missing".

== Contents ==
Story	Originally published in
"Open Arms"	The Missouri Review
"Mr. Green"	The Hudson Review
"The Trip Back"	The Southern Review
"Fairy Tale"	Virginia Quarterly Review
"Crickets"	
"Letters from My Father"	Cimarron Review
"Love"	Writer's Forum
"Mid-Autumn"	Hawaii Review
"In the Clearing"	Icarus
"A Ghost Story"	Colorado Review
"Snow"	The New Orleans Review
"Relic"	The Gettysburg Review
"Preparation"	The Sewanee Review
"The American Couple"	
"A Good Scent from a Strange Mountain"	The New England Review
"Salem"	The Mississippi Review
"Missing"	Gentlemen's Quarterly

== Synopsis ==
=== Open Arms ===
The opening story is set during the Vietnam War. The narrator, a translator for the Australian forces, recounts the story of a North Vietnamese communist named Thập who joins the Australian forces as a spy after the communists massacre his family. When the Australian soldiers bring him to a screening of pornographic films, Thập seems overwhelmed and disgusted. The narrator speculates that, as a former Communist, he considers pornography immoral, and that it simultaneously reminds him of his longing for his dead wife. Thập later kills an Australian soldier and himself.

=== Mr. Green ===
"Mr. Green" is narrated by a Catholic woman who was taught by her grandfather about ancestor worship. As a child, she was saddened when her grandfather told her that she could not tend to the worship of her family members because she is a woman. Mr. Green is a talking parrot that belonged to her great grandfather; after his death, she cares for the parrot, bringing him to the United States with her. When Mr. Green grows old and melancholy, plucking out his own feathers, the narrator kills him by wringing his neck as she had learned from her mother and grandmother. This story is about gendered values. The narrator must come to terms with her grandfather's subtle misogyny and establish her own self-worth as a woman. This story focuses on the conflict between ancient, honourable but constricting values and the modern assertion of femininity. As the narrator leaves Vietnam, she takes a reminder of this bonding Confucian values with her in the form of Mr. Green. The death of Mr. Green is therefore symbolic.

=== The Trip Back ===
"The Trip Back" is about Kánh, who drives to the airport in order to pick up his wife's grandfather, Mr. Chinh. Kánh is shocked when he discovers that Mr. Chinh is chaperoned by his cousin Hương, and during his trip home realizes that Alzheimer's disease afflicts Mr. Chinh. Kánh is deeply disturbed by this and worries whether he could ever forget his wife, whom he deeply loves. The situation is compounded further when his wife realizes that her grandfather has no recollection of her.

=== Fairy Tale ===
The story is about a Vietnamese prostitute nicknamed Miss Noi who was brought to the United States as the wife of an American GI. She divorces her husband, becomes a prostitute again, and seems happy with her station in life. She meets a Vietnam War veteran named Mr. Fontenot who proposes to her with an apple and gives her a good life.

=== Crickets ===
"Crickets" is about a man named Ted (Thiệu) who tries to teach his Americanized son how to make crickets fight, which was a favorite game of Ted's as a boy in Vietnam. His son is uninterested and Thiệu eventually gives up.

Thiệu and his new bride had escaped from Vietnam and ended up in the state of Louisiana, where the land was very much like the Mekong Delta. They struggled to adapt to the new land and language, while their American-born son, Bill, adapted easily but had little knowledge of his Vietnamese cultural background. Despite barriers of age and language, Thiệu tries to educate his son to be more Vietnamese.

=== Letters From My Father ===
"Letters From My Father" is the story of a Vietnamese teenager who has grown up without her American father. After the father arranges for his wife and daughter to come to the United States, he is unsure of how to react to his daughter, because all that he knows of her is from pictures and letters. His daughter learns more from her father by discovering some letters that he had written to the United States government in which he angrily and poetically demands his daughter's release, and she longs for him to love her in the way that he expressed his love in those letters.

=== Love ===
"Love" is about a former Vietnamese spy who has a beautiful wife, Bướm. As a spy in Vietnam, he was able to direct U.S. missiles onto the homes of men who aroused his jealousy by looking at or flirting with his wife. After moving to New Orleans, he suspects his wife of having an affair with a Vietnamese restaurant owner and consults a voodoo practitioner.

=== Preparation ===
A woman readying her friend's corpse for burial combs and envies the hair she has always considered beautiful, the same hair she used to comb when they were girls in Saigon.

=== Mid-Autumn and In the Clearing ===
The stories "Mid-Autumn" and "In the Clearing" are similar in that they deal heavily in Vietnamese mysticism. Both are dialogues between parent and child and make reference to supernatural beings. "Mid-Autumn" is about a mother's first love lost; "In the Clearing" is an apology from father to son for having to leave his family in Vietnam.

=== A Ghost Story ===
In "A Ghost Story", a man tells a story, which he claims he knows to be true, about the spirit of a beautiful woman who saves men from disaster and then reappears to eat them.

=== Snow ===
"Snow" is the story of a woman named Giàu who works as a waitress in a Chinese restaurant. A Jewish lawyer named Cohen who shares with Giàu a fear of snow talks to her as he waits for his takeaway meal on Christmas Eve. They realize that despite their different backgrounds, they have several things in common, and they arrange to go on a date.

=== The American Couple ===
"The American Couple" is the longest story in the collection at 80 pages. It is narrated by a Vietnamese woman named Gabrielle on vacation in Puerto Vallarta, Mexico. They meet an American couple, Frank and Eileen. Frank is a Vietnam veteran who is eager to talk about his experiences. Vinh and Frank begin a strange and secretive relationship in which hostilities are sometimes manifested concerning their respective roles in the Vietnam War. The story is told from the perspective of Vinh's wife, who has had little access to her husband's experiences as a soldier. It is an outsider's perspective of Vietnam veterans, and Frank and Vinh are observed at a distance.

=== A Good Scent from a Strange Mountain ===
"A Good Scent from a Strange Mountain" is the final story. It involves a grandfather, slowly dying, and seeing the vision of Ho Chi Minh, with whom he worked and lived. The politics of the Vietnamese refugees continue after they have arrived in America, as their new home country looks to deal with the newly Communist united Vietnam.

=== Salem ===
"Salem", added to later editions of the collection, is a story of a Vietnamese soldier that works alone in the jungles of Vietnam and assassinates American soldiers that stumble on his path. His job is to kill American soldiers and take the items they carry with them and hand the items over to the government so that they can identify the American soldier. The Vietnamese soldier recovers a pack of Salem cigarettes from a dead American soldier he has just killed. In the pack of cigarettes is a photograph of the dead American soldier's wife.

=== Missing ===
"Missing" is one of the two additional stories added in the later editions. This story is about an American soldier who stayed in Vietnam after the war and married a Vietnamese girl. The American soldier sees a photo of his face in a newspaper titled Missing. Because of this, he suspects that he is missing in Vietnam.
