= Kate Braverman =

American novelist (1949–2019)

- Born: February 5, 1949; Philadelphia, Pennsylvania, U.S.
- Died: October 12, 2019 (aged 70); Santa Fe, New Mexico, U.S.
- Education: University of California, Berkeley (BA); Sonoma State University (MA)
- Occupations: Novelist; short-story writer; poet

Kate Braverman (February 5, 1949 – October 12, 2019) was an American novelist, short-story writer, and poet. Los Angeles was the focus for much of her writing.

== Formative years ==
Kate Braverman was born in Philadelphia, Pennsylvania, on February 5, 1949. She moved to Los Angeles in 1958 with her family.

Braverman earned a B.A. in Anthropology from University of California, Berkeley, and an M.A. in English from Sonoma State University.

== Career ==
Braverman was a member of the Venice Poetry Workshop, Professor of Creative Writing at California State University, Los Angeles, and staff faculty of the UCLA Writer's Program.

She also taught a private workshop that included Janet Fitch, Cristina Garcia and Donald Rawley.

== Awards ==
Braverman won three Best American Short Stories awards, an O. Henry Award, and a Carver Short Story Award, as well as the Economist Prize and an Isherwood Fellowship. She was also the first recipient of Graywolf Press's Creative Nonfiction Award for Frantic Transmissions to and from Los Angeles: An Accidental Memoir, published in February 2006.

== Death ==
Braverman died in Santa Fe, New Mexico, on October 12, 2019.

== Works ==
=== Novels ===
- Lithium for Medea. Harper & Row. 1979. ISBN 0-06-010441-4.
- Palm Latitudes. Seven Stories Press. 1988. ISBN 978-1-58322-572-1.
- Wonders of the West. Fawcett Columbine. 1993. ISBN 978-0-449-90656-9.
- The Incantation of Frida K. Seven Stories Press. 2001. ISBN 978-1-58322-571-4.

=== Short stories ===
- "Squandering The Blue", KGB Bar Lit
- Squandering the Blue. Fawcett Columbine. 1990. ISBN 978-0-449-90551-7.
- Small Craft Warnings. University of Nevada Press. 1998. ISBN 978-0-87417-321-5.
- A Good Day For Seppuku. City Lights Publishers. 2018. ISBN 978-0-87286-721-5.

=== Poetry ===
- Milk Run. Momentum Press. 1977.
- Lullaby for sinners. Pinnacle Books. 1981. ISBN 978-0-523-41539-0.
- Hurricane Warnings. Illuminati. 1987. ISBN 0-89807-146-1.
- Postcard from August. Illuminati. 1990. ISBN 0-89807-262X.

=== Memoir ===
- Frantic Transmissions to and from Los Angeles: An Accidental Memoir. Graywolf Press. 2006. ISBN 978-1-55597-438-1.

=== Anthologies ===
- Bill Mohr; Sheree Levin, eds. (1985). Poetry Loves Poetry: An Anthology of Los Angeles Poets. Momentum Press. ISBN 978-0-936054-50-6.
- The Best American Short Stories 1991 ISBN 0-395-54409-2
- William Miller Abrahams, ed. (1992). Prize Stories 1992: The O. Henry Awards. Knopf Doubleday Publishing Group. ISBN 978-0-385-42192-8.
- Gerald W. Haslam, ed. (1999). Many Californias: Literature from the Golden State. University of Nevada Press. ISBN 978-0-87417-325-3.
- Ben Marcus, ed. (2004). The Anchor Book of New American Short Stories. Anchor. ISBN 978-1400034826.
