= The Woman on the Beach =

1947 film by Jean Renoir

- Theatrical release poster
- Directed by: Jean Renoir
- Screenplay by: Frank Davis; Jean Renoir; Michael Hogan
- Based on: None So Blind; 1945 novel by Mitchell Wilson
- Produced by: Jack J. Gross; Will Price
- Starring: Joan Bennett; Robert Ryan; Charles Bickford
- Cinematography: Leo Tover; Harry J. Wild
- Edited by: Lyle Boyer; Roland Gross
- Music by: Hanns Eisler
- Production company: RKO Pictures
- Distributed by: RKO Pictures
- Release date: June 7, 1947 (U.S.)
- Running time: 71 minutes
- Country: United States
- Language: English

The Woman on the Beach is a 1947 American film noir directed by Jean Renoir and starring Joan Bennett, Robert Ryan, and Charles Bickford. It was released by RKO Radio Pictures. The film is a love triangle drama about Scott, a conflicted U.S. Coast Guard officer (Ryan), and his pursuit of Peggy, a married woman (Bennett). Peggy is married to Tod, a blind former artist (Bickford).

== Plot ==
Scott, a mounted Coast Guard officer, has recurring nightmares involving a maritime tragedy. He sees himself immersed in an eerie landscape surrounded by a shipwreck and walking over skeletons at the bottom of the sea, while a ghostly blonde woman beckons him from afar. He thinks he is going mad. He proposes to Eve Geddes, a young woman working at a local shipyard catering to the Coast Guard. She accepts. Eve has a strong resemblance to the ghostly blonde of his nightmares.

While riding by the seaside on his horse Scott meets Peggy, the mysterious wife of Tod, who was a painter before going blind. He rides by her as she stands near a shipwreck protruding from the sand, like an eerie echo from his nightmares. After a conversation, they discover that they share similar metaphysical anxieties. A bond develops between the two, but the situation becomes tangled when Tod tries to befriend Scott. Tod's attitude toward Scott is ambivalent. The retired artist tests Peggy and Scott to gauge how far they could go in their relationship. Tod tells Peggy that he knows she could never leave him and that he finds Scott, a much younger man, virile but banal.

Tod cannot come to terms with the fact that, because of his blindness, he can not paint anymore. He tells Scott that dead painters' works always appreciate in value. He expects the value of his own paintings to increase, considering he is now 'dead' as a painter.

Scott is suspicious of Tod's motives and also suspects that Tod is not actually blind. Scott is increasingly interested in Peggy, and she returns his attentions. Scott sets up an outing to test Tod; He lures him near the edge of a cliff, thinking that he will be forced to see and therefore avoid falling. However, Tod falls. After this mishap, he eventually recovers. Soon after the mishap, Tod is abusive toward Peggy when he realizes that she has hidden his masterpiece, his nude portrait of her. Seeing this, Scott tries to protect Peggy.

Eve, because of Scott's infatuation with Peggy, becomes distant and asks Scott to delay their marriage plans. Scott attempts to drown both Tod and himself during a fishing trip. Peggy alerts the authorities, and Tod and Scott are rescued by the Coast Guard.

Tod burns all his paintings along with the house he and Peggy live in. Peggy frantically tries to stop Tod and save the paintings. She fails, and Scott forces her out of the collapsing house. After they have moved safely away, Scott asks Tod why he did it. Tod says the paintings were a symbol of the obsession he had with his previous, sighted life. He asks Peggy to take him to New York City, where they have happy memories of their earlier life together. He tells her that afterward, she may "do as she pleases". Peggy embraces Tod, and Scott leaves them.

== Cast ==
- Joan Bennett as Peggy Butler
- Robert Ryan as Scott Burnett
- Charles Bickford as Tod Butler
- Nan Leslie as Eve Geddes
- Walter Sande as Otto Wernecke
- Irene Ryan as Mrs. Wernecke
- Glen Vernon as Kirk
- Frank Darien as Lars
- Jay Norris as Jimmy

== Production ==
The Woman on the Beach was based upon the novel None So Blind by Mitchell A. Wilson, and had the working title Desirable Woman. RKO Pictures offered Joan Bennett the starring role in 1946, hoping to capitalize on her recent success with the films noir The Woman in the Window and Scarlet Street. Bennett was allowed to choose as director Jean Renoir, who had been France's premiere director before fleeing from the Nazis to Hollywood in 1940. Charles Koerner, the RKO chief of staff, promised carte blanche to Renoir, and even helped craft the story to Renoir's vision of the film. Renoir chose Val Lewton as producer, however Lewton left soon after shooting began, in effect leaving Renoir as his own producer. His freedom was productive; the shooting went so well that Renoir and the cast were even able to improvise on set. Soon after, Koerner died. Whereas he had balanced his business acumen with an appreciation for the artistry of movie making, the new executives were baffled by Renoir's film. A consumer preview was held, attended by high school and college students who were uninterested in the movie's dark themes. After the catastrophic preview, Renoir spent the next six months reediting the film, even reshooting several sections, causing him much distress. It was ultimately released in 1947 as The Woman on the Beach.

== Reception ==
The film recorded a loss of $610,000.

The staff at Variety liked the film and wrote, "Thesping is uniformly excellent with the cast from top to bottom responding to Renoir's controlling need for a surcharged atmosphere. In subtle counterpoint to the film's surface vagueness, the settings are notably realistic in their size and quality. Choice camerawork sustains the film's overall impact while sweeping through the entire production is a magnificent score by Hanns Eisler which heightens all of the film's pictorial values." In 1992, Leonard Maltin was less complimentary, calling the film an "overheated melodrama" and noting it was "easy to see why this was Renoir's American swan song."
