= Lan Samantha Chang =

American professor and fiction writer

Lan Samantha Chang 張嵐
- Born: 1965 (age 60–61); Appleton, Wisconsin, U.S.
- Education: Yale University (BA); Harvard University (MPA); University of Iowa (MFA)
- Writing career
- Genres: Novel, short story
- Notable works: Hunger (1998); Inheritance (2005); All Is Forgotten, Nothing Is Lost (2010); The Family Chao (2022)
- Notable awards: Anisfield-Wolf Book Award for Fiction (2023); Berlin Prize (2021); PEN Open Book Award (2005); Rona Jaffe Foundation Writers' Award (1998)
- Website: www.lansamanthachang.com

Lan Samantha Chang (Chinese: 張嵐; pinyin: Zhāng Lán; born 1965) is an American novelist and short story writer. She is the author of the novel The Family Chao and short story collection Hunger. For her fiction, which explores Chinese American and Taiwanese American experiences, she is a recipient of the Anisfield-Wolf Book Award, the Berlin Prize, the PEN Open Book Award and the Rona Jaffe Foundation Writers' Award.

She is the Elizabeth M. Stanley Professor in the Arts at the University of Iowa and has been the director of the Iowa Writers' Workshop since 2005. She is the first woman, and the first Asian American, to hold the position.

== Early life and education ==
Chang was born to a waishengren family in Appleton, Wisconsin. Her parents had moved to Taiwan following the Retreat of the government of the Republic of China to Taiwan, then moved to the United States to attend college.

Chang's mother, Helen Chung-hung (1937–2014), was born in Shanghai and, at age twelve, moved in 1949 to Taiwan, where she graduated as valedictorian from Taipei First Girls' High School. Chung-hung was the top female high school student in Taiwan during her graduation year. Chang's father, Nai Lin Chang (1922–2020), was born in Beijing and, after leaving mainland China for Taiwan, served as a lieutenant colonel in the Republic of China Armed Forces and oversaw a production factory in Taiwan. He later graduated from Columbia University with a degree in chemical engineering and Helen received an undergraduate education at Mount Mercy College. Nai Lin later returned to China in the 1980s on a visit.

After high school, Chang graduated from Yale University with a Bachelor of Arts in East Asian studies. As an undergraduate at Yale College, she was an editor of the Yale Daily News. She then worked briefly in publishing in New York City, and earned an M.P.A. from the Harvard Kennedy School and an M.F.A. from the Iowa Writers' Workshop. She was also a Stegner Fellow in fiction at Stanford University.

== Work ==
Chang's first book is a novella and short stories, titled Hunger (1998). The stories are set in the US and China, and they explore home, family, and loss. The New York Times Book Review called it "Elegant.… A delicately calculated balance sheet of the losses and gains of immigrants whose lives are stretched between two radically different cultures." The Washington Post called it "A work of gorgeous, enduring prose." The collection won the California Book Awards' Silver Medal for Fiction and was a finalist for the Los Angeles Times Book Awards's Art Seidenbaum Award for First Fiction.

Her first novel, Inheritance (2004), is about a family torn apart by the Japanese invasion during World War II. The Boston Globe said: "The story…is foreign in its historical sweep and social detail but universal in its emotional truth." Publishers Weekly noted: "It is memory — rather than dramatic action — at which Chang excels; her prose is lovely." The novel won a PEN Open Book Award in 2005.

Chang's second novel, All Is Forgotten, Nothing Is Lost (2011), follows two poets and their friendship as they explore the depths and costs of making art. The book received a starred review from Booklist and praise: "Among the many threads Chang elegantly pursues—the fraught relationships between mentors and students, the value of poetry, the price of ambition—it is her indelible portrait of the loneliness of artistic endeavor that will haunt readers the most in this exquisitely written novel about the poet’s lot." NPR wrote: "This relatively short novel begins small, but blossoms into a full and resonant story of the pains and perils, falsehoods and truths of trying to be an American artist, in this case poet, against all odds, psychological and social. In its own way, it is rather unforgettable."

Chang's fourth book and third novel, The Family Chao, was published by W. W. Norton & Company. The Guardian praised it: "One of the many pleasures of The Family Chao is the way the novel dramatises the gap between how a family wants to be seen, and its messier inner realities." The Star Tribune called it "A playful literary romp with a serious heart. Operatic and subversive."

Barack Obama chose the novel for his 2022 summer reading list. The book was a Jeopardy! clue on October 6, 2022. It won the Anisfield-Wolf Book Award for Fiction in 2023.

Chang has received fellowships from MacDowell, the American Library in Paris, the Guggenheim Foundation, the Radcliffe Institute for Advanced Study, and the National Endowment for the Arts. In 2024, she received an Arts and Letters Award from the American Academy of Arts and Letters and a fourth MacDowell Fellowship.

== Directorship of Iowa Writers' Workshop ==
As the sixth director of the Iowa Writers' Workshop, Chang has been fundamental to the increase of racial, cultural, and aesthetic diversity within the program, and has mentored a number of emerging writers. Beyond that, she is credited with increasing the program’s endowment from $2.6 million to $12.5 million. In 2019, she received the Michael J. Brody Award and the Regents' Award for Excellence from the University of Iowa.

In a 2022 interview with Open Country Mag, she discussed what her 17 years at the helm means: "One thing that seemed really clear to me was that if we were to represent American literature then we had to bring in literature from all over the world. There is the possibility of creating the conversation not just in this country but around the world that brings in as many voices as possible, and that is a goal of mine with this program. I feel like what we’re doing is work in progress."

About her work as the program director, Oprah Daily wrote: "Under Lan Samantha Chang’s mentorship, a new generation of writers has emerged."

== Awards and distinctions ==
=== Literary awards ===
Year	Title	Award	Category	Result	Ref.
1998	Hunger	Bay Area Reviewers Award	—	Nominated	
1998	Hunger	Commonwealth Club of California Book Awards	First Fiction	Silver Medal	
1998	Hunger	Los Angeles Times Book Prize	Art Seidenbaum Award	Finalist	
1999	Hunger	PEN/Hemingway Award	—	Alternate	
1999	Hunger	WLA Literary Awards	—	Won	
2005	Inheritance	Independent Publisher Book Awards	General Fiction	Finalist	
2005	Inheritance	John Gardner Fiction Book Award	—	Shortlisted	
2005	Inheritance	Massachusetts Book Award	Fiction	Honor	
2005	Inheritance	PEN Open Book Award	—	Won	
2011	All Is Forgotten, Nothing Is Lost	John Gardner Fiction Book Award	—	Shortlisted	
2011	All Is Forgotten, Nothing Is Lost	Paterson Fiction Prize	—	Finalist	
2022	The Family Chao	Heartland Booksellers Award	Fiction	Finalist	
2023	The Family Chao	Anisfield-Wolf Book Award	Fiction	Won	
2023	The Family Chao	Joyce Carol Oates Literary Prize	—	Longlisted	
2023	The Family Chao	WLA Outstanding Achievement Award	Fiction	Won	

=== Honors ===
- 1993: Stegner Fellowship, Stanford University
- 1998: National Endowment for the Arts, Creative Writing Fellowship in Prose
- 1998: Rona Jaffe Foundation Writers' Award
- 1999: Alfred Hodder Fellow, Princeton University
- 2000: Radcliffe Fellow, Radcliffe Institute for Advanced Study, Harvard University
- 2008: Guggenheim Fellowship
- 2015: American Library in Paris Visiting Fellowship
- 2016: Doctor of Humane Letters, Lawrence University
- 2021: Berlin Prize Fellow, American Academy in Berlin
- 2024: Arts and Letters Award from the American Academy of Arts and Letters
- 2024: MacDowell Fellowship

== Works ==
=== Novels ===
- Hunger (W. W. Norton & Company, 1998)
- Inheritance: A Novel (W. W. Norton & Company, 2005)
- All Is Forgotten, Nothing Is Lost: A Novel (W. W. Norton & Company, 2010)
- The Family Chao (W. W. Norton & Company, 2022)

=== Short stories ===
- "Pipa's Story", The Atlantic Monthly, August, 1993 and The Best American Short Stories 1994
- "New House", Greensboro Review 57 (1994–95); Fish Stories: Collective I Honorable Mention for Fiction, Greensboro Review Literary Awards Distinguished Story of 1995, The Best American Short Stories
- "The Eve of the Spirit Festival", Prairie Schooner 69:1 (1995) Prairie Schooner Readers' Choice Award for Fiction The Best American Short Stories 1996
- "A Dream of Western Music", Stanford Today 1:1 (1996) Distinguished Story of 1997, The Best American Short Stories
- "San", Story 44:1 (1996) Distinguished Story of 1997, The Best American Short Stories Special Mention, Pushcart Prize, 1998
- "A Genealogy of Longing", Story 47:4 (1999) Distinguished Story of 2000, The Best American Short Stories
- "The Cottage", Freeman's, Grove Atlantic, (2018) Distinguished Story of 2018, The Best American Short Stories

=== Selected nonfiction ===
- "Pass the Turkey. And the Stir-Fry", The New York Times, November 26, 1998
- "And Iowa Now", The New York Times, January 3, 2008
- "Volvos from Florida", The New York Times, March 7, 2009
- "Writers, Protect Your Inner Life", Literary Hub, August 7, 2017

== See also ==
- List of Asian-American writers
- Yale Daily News
- Iowa Writers' Workshop
