= Robert Olen Butler =

American fiction writer (born 1945)

- Butler at the 2026 World Fantasy Convention
- Born: January 20, 1945 (age 81); Granite City, Illinois, U.S.
- Education: Northwestern University (BS); University of Iowa (MFA)
- Occupations: Novelist, short fiction writer
- Writing career
- Period: 1981–present
- Notable works: A Good Scent from a Strange Mountain, Tabloid Dreams
- Movement: Magical realism

Robert Olen Butler (born January 20, 1945) is an American fiction writer. His short-story collection A Good Scent from a Strange Mountain was awarded the Pulitzer Prize for fiction in 1993.

== Early life ==
Butler was born in Granite City, Illinois, to Robert Olen Butler Sr., an actor and theater professor who became the chairman of the theater department of Saint Louis University, and his wife, the former Lucille Frances Hall, an executive secretary.

Butler attended Northwestern University as a theater major (BS, 1967) and switched to playwriting at the University of Iowa (MA, 1969).

Butler served in Vietnam from 1969 to 1971, first as a counter-intelligence special agent for the Army and later as a translator. He rose to the rank of sergeant in the Army Military Intelligence Corps. His experiences during that period have informed his writings, and as a result, in 1987 Butler received the Tu Do Chinh Kien Award from the Vietnam Veterans of America for outstanding contributions to American culture by a veteran. "My greatest pleasure in life was at 2 in the morning to wander out into the steamy back alleys of Saigon, where nobody ever seemed to sleep, and just walk the alleys and crouch in the doorways with the people," Butler told The New York Times in 1993. "The Vietnamese were the warmest, most open and welcoming people I've ever met, and they just invited me into their homes and into their culture and into their lives."

After working as a steel mill laborer, a taxi driver, and a substitute teacher in high schools in the years following his tour of duty in Vietnam, Butler joined Fairchild Publications, where he worked on the staffs of trade publications such as Electronic News. From 1975 until 1985, he was the editor-in-chief of Fairchild's Energy User News (now Energy & Power Management).

== Literary career ==
Robert Olen Butler is the author of 12 novels and six short story collections, including A Good Scent from a Strange Mountain, which won the 1993 Pulitzer Prize for Fiction. In a review for the Guardian newspaper, renowned author Claire Messud wrote, "The book has attracted such acclaim not simply because it is beautifully and powerfully written, but because it convincingly pulls off an immense imaginative risk. . . . Butler has not entered the significant and ever-growing canon of Vietnam-related fiction (he has long been a member)—he has changed its composition forever."

Butler began writing novels on the Long Island Rail Road while working as a publicist for Fairchild Publications. "Every word of my first four published novels was written on a legal pad, by hand, on my lap, on the Long Island Rail Road as I commuted back and forth from Sea Cliff to Manhattan," Butler has said of his early writing.

Butler's first novel was The Alleys of Eden, which was published in 1981 by Horizon Press after being rejected by 21 publishers. Its protagonist is an American deserter who decides to stay in Vietnam, as Butler's onetime writing professor Anatole Broyard wrote in The New York Times, "because, with all its troubles, Vietnam seems to him to retain more of its integrity, its sense of self, than the America he has left behind." Before the publication of The Alleys of Eden, Butler had written, by his estimation, "five ghastly novels, about forty dreadful short stories, and twelve truly awful full-length plays, all of which have never seen the light of day and never will."

Butler has always been a controversial artist, seemingly reinventing himself with each new novel or short story collection. His shape-shifting often polarizes reviewers, as with his second novel, Sun Dogs (Horizon, 1983), which The New York Times said had "some powerful moments, some engrossing scenes and deft touches, but there is little momentum, no satisfying pattern, none of the magic of synergy." Conversely, the Ft. Worth Star-Telegram called the book "full of power and energy...mov[ing] from the most feverish of prose to a flatness and sparseness that is reminiscent of the best of Chandler and Hammett. And most importantly, he has something to say... Butler is an intelligent novelist who cares about his characters. He is skillful enough to make the reader feel the same way. It is not often that we get the chance to witness the birth of something this important."

Butler's stories have appeared in such publications as The New Yorker, Esquire, Harper's, The Atlantic Monthly, GQ, and Zoetrope: All-Story. He has had stories in 12 editions of The Best American Short Stories, New Stories From the South, and numerous college literature textbooks. Butler has also written screenplays for film and television, most of them based on other writers' material.

Butler's short-story collections Tabloid Dreams (1996) and Had a Good Time (2004) take their inspiration from popular culture. The stories in Tabloid Dreams were spun from the titles of outlandish articles in supermarket tabloids. Had a Good Time builds its narratives around the images on vintage American picture postcards, which Butler has collected for more than a decade. One example is the tale "Mother in the Trenches", first published in Harper's in February 2003. It traces the journey of Mrs. Jack Gaines, a prosperous matron, from her comfortable home to the battlefields of World War I France, in order to convince her soldier son to come home; the story's basis is a period postcard that depicts a stout, middle-aged woman wearing dark clothes and a cloche hat.

Again the critical response varied dramatically. The San Francisco Chronicle said that the stories "feel like a literary parlor game"; The Boston Globe called them full of "crisp writing, marvelous imagining, the discussion of large, existential questions that are as central to life now as they were a hundred years ago."

Severance, Butler's 2006 collection of 240-word short stories about the post-beheading thoughts of decapitated people (from Nicole Brown Simpson to Louis XVI to Butler himself) was the basis of Severance, a one-act play by David Jette. It was produced in 2007 at McCadden Place Theatre in Los Angeles. At the time, Butler described Severance as his best and most ambitious book.

This was the first of an extended venture into defining and exploring the short short story form. His companion collection, Intercourse, comprising 100 very short stories, revealed the inner monologues of couples (often famous) engaged in sexual intercourse. Weegee Stories, presenting the inner monologues of the subjects of 60 iconic photographs by Arthur "Weegee" Fellig, continued his interest in the form. He also published a theory of the short short story in Narrative Magazine.

As further evidence of his predilection for self-reinvention, in 2009 Butler published Hell, a "roaring satire" of a novel set entirely in the underworld. Donna Seaman of Booklist, the American Library Association's magazine, called his 2011 novel A Small Hotel a "sexy novel of psychological suspense", adding, "Butler executes a plot twist of profound proportions in this gorgeously controlled, unnerving, and beautifully revealing tale of the consequences of emotional withholding."

In still another act of reinvention, Butler published his first literary/historical/espionage/thriller, The Hot Country, with Otto Penzler's Mysterious Press in the fall of 2012.

In 2001, Butler wrote in real time a complete short story, "This is Earl Sandt," from first inspiration to final story, in a webcast of 17 two-hour sessions. As he said of the broadcasts, "What we're trying to do here is reproduce for you what is normally hidden behind the veil of private life". The webcasts, under the title "Inside Creative Writing," have been available on iTunes.

Butler taught creative writing from 1985 to 2000 at McNeese State University in Lake Charles, Louisiana, with his colleague John Wood, to whom he dedicated A Good Scent from a Strange Mountain. He then joined the faculty of Florida State University as a Francis Eppes Distinguished Professor, holding the Michael Shaara Chair in Creative Writing.

== Awards and honors ==
Butler is a recipient of a Guggenheim Fellowship in fiction and a National Endowment for the Arts grant, and was a finalist for the PEN/Faulkner Award. In 2001 he won a National Magazine Award for "Fair Warning," a short story published in the journal Zoetrope: All-Story, and four years later he won another National Magazine Award for "The One in White," a short story published in The Atlantic Monthly.

In 1993, his first story collection, A Good Scent from a Strange Mountain, won the Pulitzer Prize for fiction. The New York Times praised the book's "startling, dreamlike" stories about the lives of Vietnamese immigrants living in Louisiana, and said it was "remarkable not for its flaws, but for how beautifully it achieves its daring project of making the Vietnamese real." The Pulitzer committee said that the stories "raise the literature of the Vietnam conflict to an original and highly personal new level."

Butler also judged the annual Robert Olen Butler Prize, a short-fiction award founded and sponsored by Del Sol Press, with the most recent prize awarded in 2010. He also judges The Southeast Review's short-short story contest.

- 2013: received the Fitzgerald Award for Achievement in American Literature award, given annually in Rockville, Maryland, the city where Fitzgerald, his wife, and his daughter are buried, as part of the F. Scott Fitzgerald Literary Festival.

== Marriages ==
On August 10, 1968, Butler married Carol Supplee. They divorced in January 1972.

On July 1, 1972, Butler married poet Marylin Geller (now known professionally as Marylin Krepf).

On July 21, 1987, Butler married Maureen Donlan. They divorced in March 1995.

On April 23, 1995, at Tavern on the Green restaurant in New York City, Butler married the novelist and playwright Elizabeth Dewberry. They ended their marriage in July 2007 and were divorced on July 19, according to an email Butler sent to his graduate students and fellow professors at Florida State University about Dewberry's decision to leave him for communications mogul Ted Turner. A controversy arose over the highly personal revelations in Butler's email, which was leaked by one of its recipients and subsequently reported on by major international media outlets, such as The Washington Post, The New York Times, and National Public Radio.

On November 22, 2011, Butler married Kelly Lee Daniels, now known professionally as K. Iver, a trans non-binary poet. They divorced in April 2020.

On June 19, 2022, Butler married Clara Guzman Herrera. She died on August 26, 2024, in Monticello, Florida.

== Works ==
=== Novels ===
- The Alleys of Eden (1981)
- Sun Dogs (1982)
- Countrymen of Bones (1983)
- On Distant Ground (1985)
- Wabash (1987)
- The Deuce (1989)
- They Whisper (1994)
- The Deep Green Sea (1997)
- Mr. Spaceman (2000)
- Fair Warning (2002)
- Hell (2009)
- A Small Hotel (2011)
- Perfume River: A Novel (2016)
- Late City (2021)
- Citizen Parrot (novella, 2027)

=== Christopher Marlowe Cobb series ===
- The Hot Country (2012) ISBN 0-8021-2046-6
- The Star of Istanbul (2013) ISBN 978-0-8021-2155-4
- The Empire of Night (2014)
- Paris in the Dark (2018)

=== Short story collections ===
- A Good Scent from a Strange Mountain (1992)
- Tabloid Dreams (1996)
- Had a Good Time: Stories from American Postcards (2004)
- Severance (2006)
- Intercourse (2008)
- Weegee Stories (2010)

=== Non-fiction ===
- From Where You Dream: The Process of Writing Fiction (2005)

=== Anthologies ===
- The Best American Short Stories 1991 (1991)
- The Best American Short Stories 1992 (1992)
- The Best American Short Stories 1994 (1994)

=== Other publications ===
- Introduction to Vietnam War Literature: A Catalogue (1990)
- The Robert Olen Butler Prize Stories 2004 (2005) ISBN 0-9748229-5-7
- The Robert Olen Butler Prize Stories 2005 (2006) ISBN 0-9748229-8-1
- The Robert Olen Butler Prize Stories 2007 (2007) ISBN 978-0-979150-16-6
- The Robert Olen Butler Prize Stories 2008 (2008) ISBN 978-1-934832-06-6
- The Robert Olen Butler Prize Stories 2009 (2011) ISBN 978-1-934832-11-0

== See also ==
- Best American Short Stories 1991 (1991)
