= Rick Bass =

American writer (born 1958)

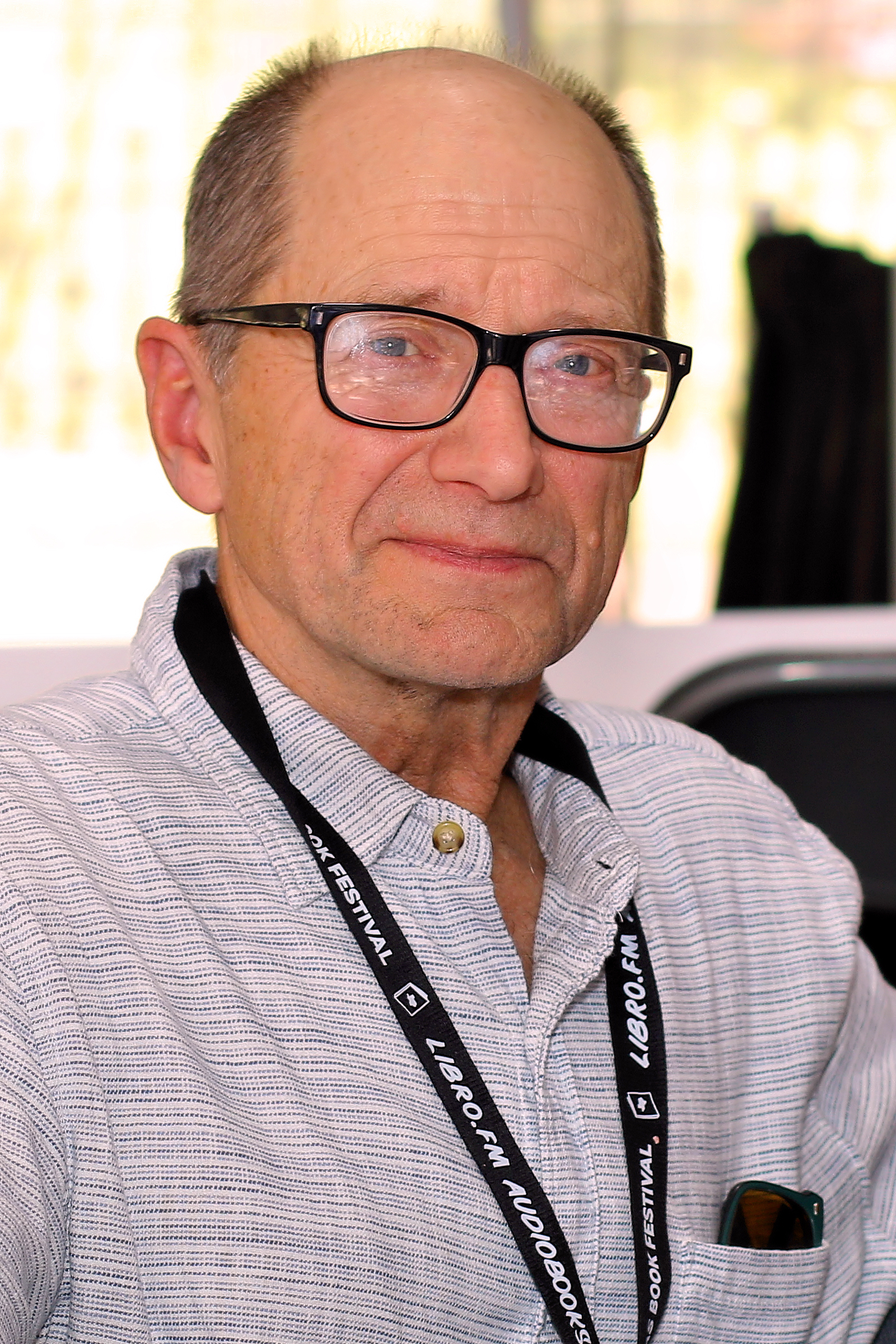
- Bass at the 2025 Texas Book Festival
- Born: March 7, 1958 (age 68); Fort Worth, Texas, U.S.
- Education: Utah State University
- Occupations: Writer and environmental activist
- Spouse: Elizabeth Hughes Bass (1987-2015)
- Writing career
- Notable work: For a Little While
- Notable awards: Story Prize
- Website: Official website

Rick Bass (born March 7, 1958) is an American writer and an environmental activist. He has a Bachelor of Science in geology with a focus in Wildlife from Utah State University. Right after he graduated, he interned for one year as a Wildlife Biologist at the Weyerhaeuser Timber Company in Arkansas. He then went onto working as an oil and gas geologist and consultant before becoming a writer and teacher. He has worked across the United States at various universities: University of Texas at Austin, Beloit College, University of Montana, Pacific University, Montana State University, Iowa State University. He teaches at the Stonecoast MFA low-residency program in Maine. He has done many workshops and lectures on writing and wildlife throughout his career. Texas Tech University, Texas State University, and University of Texas at Austin have collections of his written work.

== Life ==
Bass was born in Fort Worth, Texas. He studied petroleum geology at Utah State University. He grew up in Houston, and started writing short stories on his lunch breaks while working as a petroleum geologist in Jackson, Mississippi. In 1987, he married the artist Elizabeth Hughes Bass, with whom he had two children before their divorce in 2015. He moved to Yaak Valley, where he worked to protect his adopted home from roads and logging. Rick serves on the board of the Yaak Valley Forest Council. He teaches and gives readings in the U.S. and abroad.

His papers are held in two collections: the Sowell Family Collection in Literature, Community, and the Natural World, part of the Southwest Collection/Special Collections Library at Texas Tech University, and Texas State University–San Marcos's Wittliff Collections.

== Awards ==
Bass won The Story Prize for books published in 2016 for his collection of new and selected stories, For a Little While.

He won the 1995 James Jones Literary Society First Novel Fellowship for his novel in progress, Where the Sea Used to Be.

He was a finalist for the Story Prize in 2006 for his short story collection The Lives of Rocks.

He was a finalist for the 2008 National Book Critics Circle Award (autobiography) for Why I Came West (2008).

He was also awarded the General Electric Younger Writers Award, a PEN/Nelson Algren Award Special Citation for fiction, and a National Endowment for the Arts fellowship.

== Works ==
=== Fiction ===
- The Watch: Stories. W. W. Norton & Company. 1994. ISBN 978-0-393-31135-8. (Originally published 1989)
- Platte River. University of Nebraska Press. 1994. ISBN 978-0-8032-5973-7.
- In the Loyal Mountains. Houghton Mifflin Harcourt. 1995. ISBN 0-395-71687-X.
- The Sky, The Stars, The Wilderness. Houghton Mifflin Harcourt. 1997. ISBN 0-395-71758-2. "Rick Bass."
- Fiber. University of Georgia Press. 1998. ISBN 978-0-8203-2063-2. "fiber rick bass."
- Where the Sea Used to Be. Houghton Mifflin Harcourt. 1999. ISBN 978-0-395-95781-3. (Originally published 1998)
- The Hermit's Story. Houghton Mifflin Harcourt. 2003. ISBN 978-0-618-38044-2. (Originally published 2002)
- The Diezmo. Houghton Mifflin Harcourt. 2005. ISBN 0-395-92617-3. "Rick Bass."
- The Lives of Rocks: Stories. Houghton Mifflin Harcourt. 2006. ISBN 978-0-618-59674-4. "Rick Bass."
- The Blue Horse: A Novella. Narrative Library. 2009.
- Nashville Chrome: A Novel. Houghton Mifflin Harcourt. 2010. ISBN 978-0-547-31726-7.
- All the Land to Hold Us. Houghton Mifflin Harcourt. 2013. ISBN 978-0-547-68712-4. "Rick Bass All the Land to Hold Us."
- For a Little While: New and Selected Stories. Little, Brown and Company. 2016. ISBN 978-0-316-38115-4

=== Nonfiction ===
- The Deer Pasture. W. W. Norton & Company. 1996. ISBN 978-0-393-31435-9. (Originally published 1985)
- Wild to the Heart. W. W. Norton & Company. 1997. ISBN 978-0-393-31487-8. (Originally published 1987)
- Oil Notes. Flamingo. 1990. ISBN 978-0-87074-383-2.
- Winter: Notes from Montana. Houghton Mifflin Harcourt. 1991. ISBN 978-0-395-61150-0. "Rick Bass."
- The Ninemile Wolves. Houghton Mifflin Harcourt. 2003. ISBN 978-0-618-26302-8. (Originally published 1992)
- The Lost Grizzlies. Houghton Mifflin Harcourt. 1997. ISBN 978-0-395-85700-7. (Originally published 1995)
- The Book of Yaak. Houghton Mifflin Harcourt. 1997. ISBN 978-0-395-87746-3. (Originally published 1996)
- The New Wolves: The Return of the Mexican Wolf to the American Southwest. Globe Pequot. 2007. ISBN 978-1-59921-228-9. (Originally published 1998)
- Brown Dog of the Yaak: Essays on Art and Activism. Milkweed Editions. 1999. ISBN 978-1-57131-224-2.
- Colter: The True Story of the Best Dog I Ever Had. Houghton Mifflin Harcourt. 2000. ISBN 978-0-395-92618-5. (Originally published 2000)
- Why I Came West: A Memoir. Houghton Mifflin Harcourt. 2008. ISBN 978-0-618-59675-1.
- The Wild Marsh: Four Seasons at Home in Montana. Houghton Mifflin Harcourt. 2009. ISBN 978-0-547-05516-9.
- Caribou Rising: Defending the Porcupine Caribou Herd, Gwitch-'in Culture and the Arctic National Wildlife Refuge. Sierra Club Books. 2004. ISBN 1-57805-114-2.
- In My Home There is No More Sorrow: Ten Days in Rwanda. McSweeney's Books. 2011. ISBN 978-1-936365-99-9.
- The Heart Beneath the Heart: An Essay on Writing and Life. Narrative Library. 2011.
- The Black Rhinos of Namibia: Searching for Survivors in the African Desert. Houghton Mifflin Harcourt. 2012. ISBN 978-0-54705-521-3.
- A Thousand Deer: Four Generations of Hunting and the Hill Country. University of Texas Press. 2012.
- The Traveling Feast: On the Road and at the Table with My Heroes. Little, Brown and Company. 2018.
- With Every Great Breath: New and Selected Essays, 1995-2023. Counterpoint. 2024.
- Wrecking Ball: Race, Friendship, God, and Football. High Road Books. 2025. ISBN 978-0-82636-856-0

=== As Editor ===
- The Roadless Yaak: Reflections and Observations About One of Our Last Great Wild Places. 2002
- Falling From Grace in Texas: A Literary Response to the Demise of Paradise. Wings Press. 2004. With Paul Christensen, Ed.
- Fortunate Son: Selected Essays from the Lone Star State. High Road Books. 2021.

=== Anthologies ===
- Pushcart Prize
- O. Henry Award.
- Best American Short Stories 1991
- Best American Short Stories 1996
- Best American Short Stories 1999
- Best American Short Stories 2001.
- The Best American Science and Nature Writing 2013

=== About Rick Bass, non-fiction by others ===
- The Literary Art and Activism of Rick Bass, edited by O. Alan Weltzein, (2001). ISBN 978-0-87480-697-7
