= Christopher Tilghman =

American novelist and short story writer

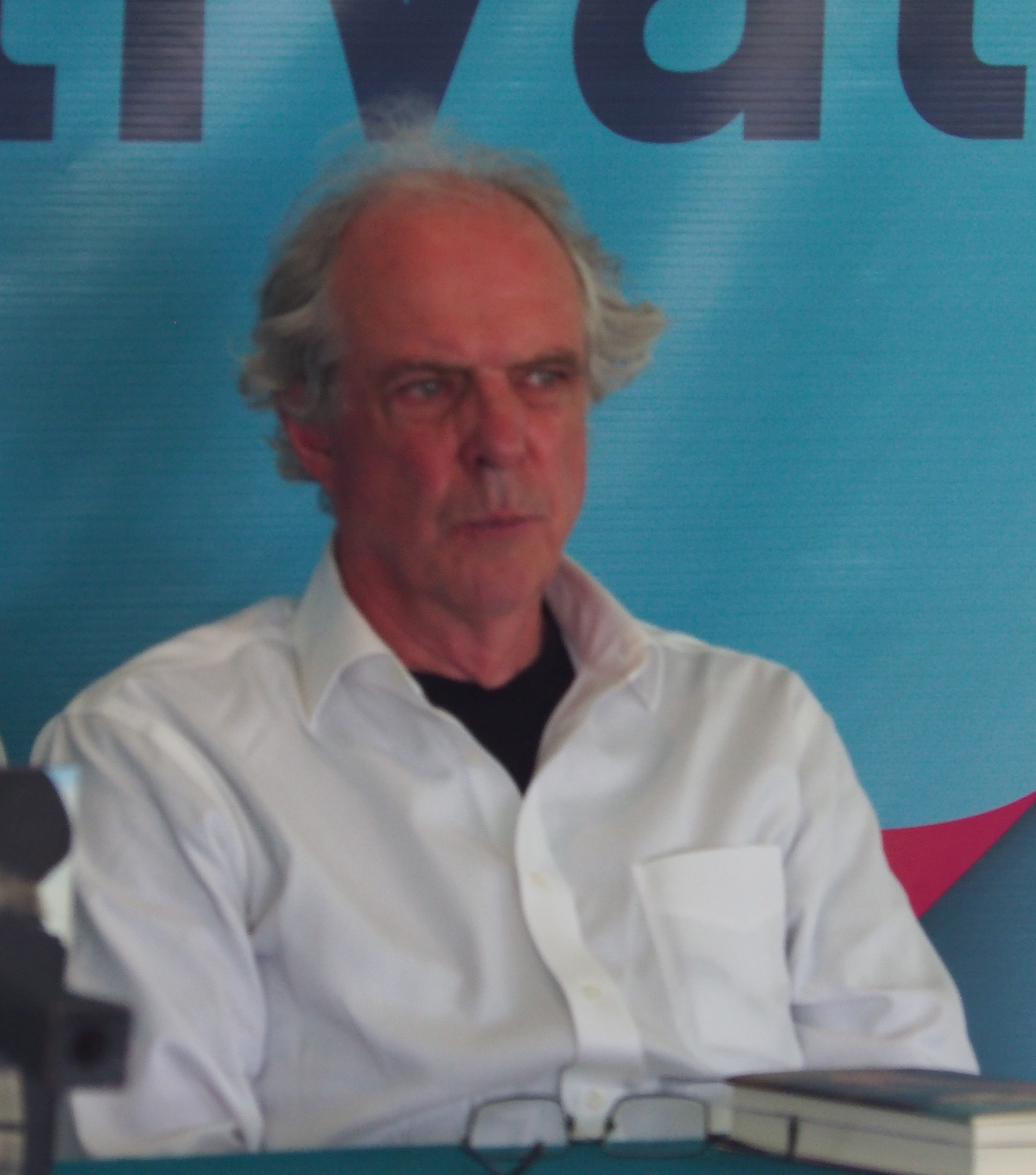
- Education: Yale University
- Writing career
- Notable awards: Whiting Award

Christopher Tilghman is an American novelist and short story writer.

== Life ==
He graduated from Yale University. He served three years in the Navy. He worked at a sawmill in New Hampshire, moved back to Cambridge, Massachusetts. He was a corporate copywriter and journalist. He edited Ploughshares. He lived with his wife and three sons in rural Massachusetts.

He teaches at the University of Virginia and the Napa Writers' Conference.

== Awards ==
- 1990 Whiting Award
- 1993-1994 Guggenheim Fellowship
- Ingram Merrill Foundation Award

== Works ==
=== Books ===
- In a Father's Place: Stories. HarperPerennial. ISBN 978-0-06-097383-4. (reprint 1991)
- Mason's Retreat. Random House. 1996. ISBN 978-0-679-42712-4.
- The Way People Run: Stories. Random House. 1999. ISBN 978-0-679-44971-3.
- Roads of the Heart. Random House, Inc. 2005. ISBN 978-0-8129-7431-7.
- The Right-Hand Shore. Farrar, Straus and Giroux. 2012. ISBN 978-0-374-20348-1.
- Thomas and Beal in the Midi. Farrar, Straus and Giroux, 2019. ISBN 978-0-374-27652-2.

=== Stories ===
- "Norfolk, 1969", Virginia Quarterly Review, Spring 1986
- "On the Rivershore", Virginia Quarterly Review, Spring 1989
- "Aerial Bombardment", Virginia Quarterly Review, "Writers on Writers," 2006
