= Thom Jones =

American short story writer

Thomas Douglas Jones (January 26, 1945 – October 14, 2016) was an American writer, primarily of short stories.

== Biography ==
Jones was raised in Aurora, Illinois, where he went to public schools. He went to college at the University of Hawaiʻi, where he played catcher on the baseball team.

He later attended the University of Washington, from which he graduated in 1970. He studied at the Iowa Writers' Workshop at the University of Iowa, from which he received an M.F.A. in 1973.

Jones trained in Force Reconnaissance in the Marine Corps but was discharged before his unit was sent to Vietnam. He used this and other personal experiences, including the suicide of his father, a boxer, after being confined to a mental institution, as sources for his fiction.

After graduation from college, he worked as a copywriter for a Chicago advertising agency and later as a janitor, while reading and writing for hours each day.

He was "discovered" well into his forties by the fiction editors of The New Yorker, who published "The Pugilist at Rest" (1991), which won an O. Henry Award. It was included in Best American Short Stories of 1992. Other stories of his were published in The New Yorker, as well as in Harper's, Esquire, Mirabella, Story, and Buzz.

In 1993 he published his first collection of stories, for which this was the title story.

Jones resided in Olympia, Washington, where he died on October 14, 2016, at the age of 71. He had temporal lobe epilepsy and diabetes. He was eulogized in The New Yorker magazine, by Joyce Carol Oates.

== Early work ==
In 1973, Jones published an animal-fantasy allegory in the dystopian George Orwell mode titled "Brother Dodo's Revenge" in The Magazine of Fantasy and Science Fiction.

== Short-Story collections ==
His first book, published in 1993, was the short-story collection The Pugilist at Rest. The stories deal with common themes of mortality and pain, with characters who often find a kind of solace in the rather pessimistic philosophy of Schopenhauer. Boxing, absent or mentally ill fathers, physical trauma, and the Vietnam War are also recurring motifs. The collection was a National Book Award finalist.

Jones published two other collections of short stories, Cold Snap (1995) and Sonny Liston Was a Friend of Mine (1999). See List of Thom Jones Stories.

Night Train: New and Selected Stories was published in October 2018 by Little, Brown.

== Since 1999 ==
His story "Night Train," which originally appeared in the magazine Tin House, was included in The Best American Nonrequired Reading 2004. A humorous essay, "Easter Island Noodles Almondine," about a time when Jones worked as a youth for the General Mills plant in Aurora, Illinois, was published in a 2009 issue of Granta focused on Chicago. "Bomb Shelter Noel," a story about a diabetic girl, was published in the January 2011 issue of Playboy.

== Script writing ==
Reports have appeared stating Jones wrote screenplays for feature films, including a Vietnam screenplay for Cheyenne Enterprises. He was reported to have adapted Larry Brown's novel, The Rabbit Factory (2003), as a screenplay for Ithaka Films.

== Reception ==
- His short story, "The Pugilist at Rest" (1991), won an O. Henry Award and was included in Best American Short Stories of 1992.
- His first collection, The Pugilist at Rest (1993), was nominated for a National Book Award.
- In a Salon.com interview, writer John Updike praised Jones as one of two writers of a younger generation he admired. Updike included Jones's story, "I Want To Live!", in the anthology, The Best American Short Stories of the Century (2000).
