= Alice Adams (writer) =

American journalist (1926–1999)

- Born: Alice Boyd Adams; August 14, 1926; Fredericksburg, Virginia
- Died: May 27, 1999 (aged 72); San Francisco, California
- Education: Radcliffe College
- Known for: Writer, Novelist, Professor
- Notable work: Beautiful Girl (1979), To See You Again (1982), Superior Women (1984), Return Trips (1985), After You've Gone (1989), The Last Lovely City (1999), The Stories of Alice Adams (2002)
- Spouse: Mark Linenthal

Alice Boyd Adams (August 14, 1926 – May 27, 1999) was an American short story writer and novelist. In 1982 she became the third author of only four to receive the O. Henry Special Award for Continuing Achievement for her short stories (others having gone to John Updike, Joyce Carol Oates, and Alice Munro).

== Early life ==
Alice Boyd Adams was born in Fredericksburg, Virginia, the only child of Agatha Erskine Boyd Adams and Nicholson Barney Adams. Her father was a Spanish professor at the University of North Carolina and her mother an aspiring, but unfulfilled writer and university librarian. Adams described her family as "three difficult, isolated people." She grew up in Chapel Hill, North Carolina. She attended public schools in Chapel Hill and Wisconsin before graduating from St. Catherine's School in Richmond, Virginia at age 16. From there she went directly to Radcliffe College, where she took a short-story writing course at Harvard before she graduated in 1946 at the age of 19. After working in publishing in New York, she married Mark Linenthal Junior, a Harvard student who had been a prisoner-of-war in Germany. They lived in Paris in 1947-1948 where they became friends with Norman Mailer and his first wife, Beatrice Silverman Mailer, and then moved to Palo Alto where Mark attended graduate school in English literature at Stanford University and Alice did clerical jobs. They became friends with writer and later editor William S. Abrahams. Their only child, artist Peter Linenthal, was born in 1951. They moved to San Francisco in 1955, when Mark began teaching at San Francisco State University (then College). Throughout her marriage Alice continued to write fiction but had little luck getting published. Linenthal and Adams divorced in 1958.

== Career ==
Adams sold her short story, "Winter Rain," to Charm magazine. Her first novel was Careless Love (1966); in 1969 she began publishing stories in The New Yorker and received growing recognition. Eventually, she published more than 25 stories there. She wrote eleven novels, including the bestseller Superior Women, but is best known and most admired for her short stories, collected in Beautiful Girl (1979), To See You Again (1982), Return Trips (1985), After You've Gone (1989), and The Last Lovely City (1999), as well as in the posthumous selection called The Stories of Alice Adams (2002). All her short story collections and all but one novel were published by Victoria Wilson at Alfred A. Knopf, Inc. After the War and The Stories of Alice Adams appeared posthumously.

Adams's place in late-twentieth-century American literature has been earned, writes Christine C. Ferguson, "not only by the skill and deftness of her prose, but also by her challenge to hackneyed dismissal of love's redemptive possibilities. She presents a world where the potential for smart and independent women to have their cake and eat it, too, to enjoy professional and romantic success, stubbornly persists even if not often realized. No romanticist, Adams never flinches from describing all the vagaries and disappointments that afflict sexual and platonic relationships, but neither does she ever permit these descriptions to produce a sense of crushing pessimism." Reviewers described her work as "fusing the sensibilities of Jane Austen and Mary McCarthy."

She taught writing at Stanford University, the University of California, Davis, and the University of California at Berkeley.

== Process ==
Adams sometimes followed a pattern she called ABDCE in outlining a short story, which she described to her friend Anne Lamott. "The letters stand for Action, Background, Development, Climax, and Ending. You begin with action that is compelling enough to draw [the reader] in, make us want to know more. Background is where you ... see and know who these people are, how they've come to be together, what was going on before the opening of the story. Then you develop these people, so that we learn what they care most about. The plot – the drama, the actions, the tension – will grow out of that. You move them along until everything comes together in the climax, after which things are different for the main characters, different in some real way. And then there is the ending: what is our sense of who these people are now, what are they left with, what happened, and what did it mean?Adams's ABDCE method became a useful way of organizing short stories by moving from an engaging opening through character development and a climax to a meaningful ending."

== Recognition ==
She received numerous awards, including the O. Henry Special Award for Continuing Achievement, several Best American Short Stories Awards, Guggenheim and NEA fellowships, and a literature award from the American Academy and Institute of Arts and Letters. Her stories have frequently been anthologized, including in 22 O. Henry Awards collections. The short story "Barcelona" was included in The Norton Anthology of Contemporary Fiction (1998), edited by R. V. Cassill and Joyce Carol Oates.

== Personal life ==
During the early 1950s, a psychiatrist advised Adams to stay married but stop writing. Soon after, her marriage to Mark Linenthal broke up. She then spent several years as a single mother working as a medical secretary. Her domestic partner from 1966 to 1987 was interior designer Robert McNie. She enjoyed close friendships with authors Mary Gaitskill, Anne Lamott, Max Steele, Ella Leffland, Diane Johnson, Alison Lurie, and Carolyn See, and editors Frances Kiernan, William Abrahams, and Victoria Wilson. She spent the majority of her adult life in San Francisco.

== Death ==
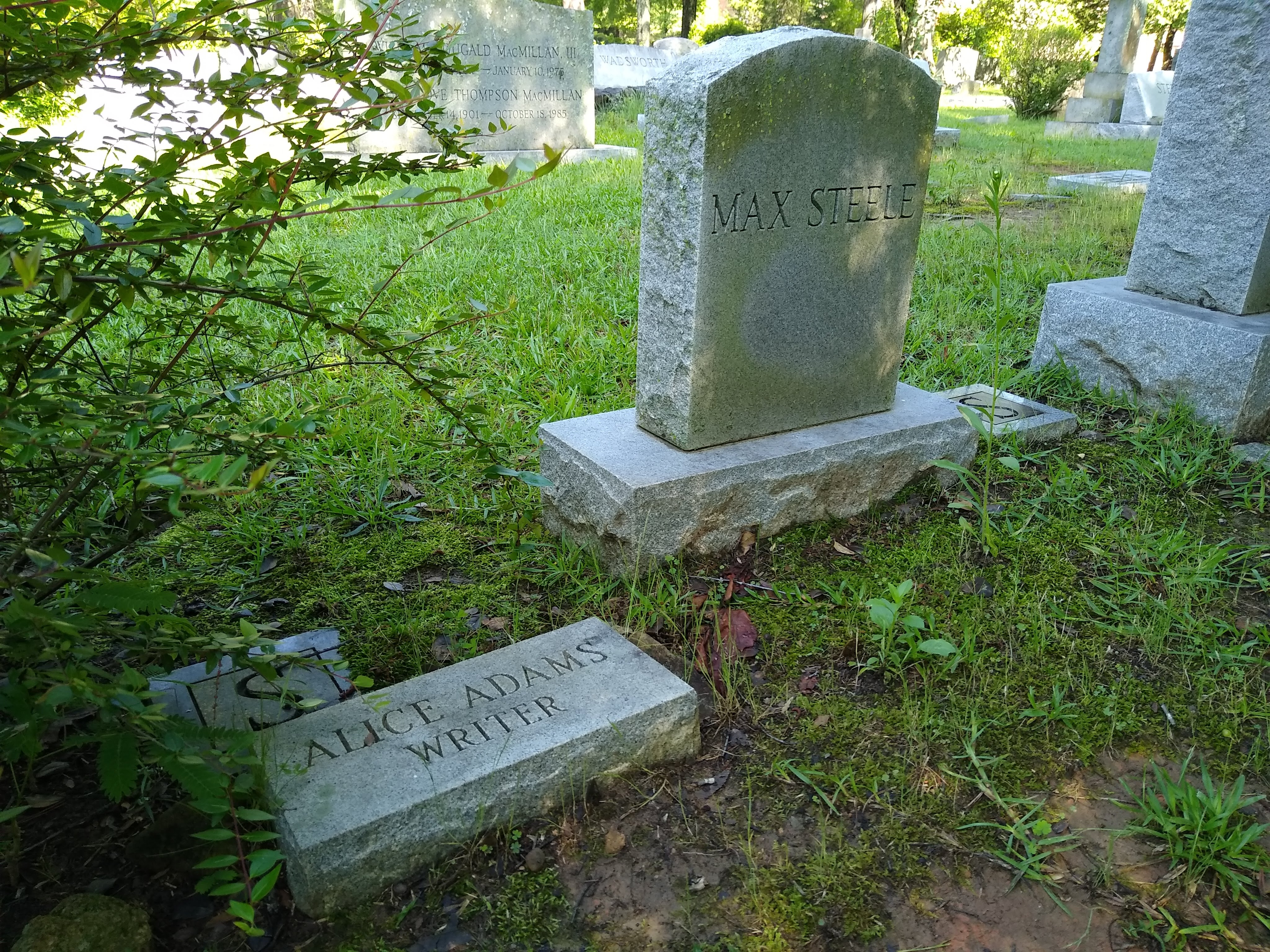
Graves of Alice Adams and Max Steele at the Old Chapel Hill Cemetery

Adams died in her sleep at her home in San Francisco, California, in 1999 at the age of 72. Previously that week, she had been treated for heart problems. She was survived by her son, artist Peter Linenthal.

== Works ==
- Careless Love (titled The Fall of Daisy Duke in U.K.)(1966)
- Families and Survivors (1975)
- Listening to Billie (1978)
- Beautiful Girl (short story collection) (1979)
- Rich Rewards (1980)
- To See You Again (short story collection) (1982)
- Molly's Dog (1983)
- Superior Women (1984)
- Return Trips (short story collection) (1985)
- Second Chances (1988)
- After You've Gone (short story collection) (1989)
- Mexico: Some Travels and Some Travelers There, introduction by Jan Morris (1990)
- Caroline's Daughters (1991)
- Almost Perfect (1993)
- A Southern Exposure (1995)
- Medicine Men (1997)
- The Last Lovely City (short story collection) (1999)
- After the War (2000) (posthumous)
- The Stories of Alice Adams (2002) (posthumous)
- The Stories of Alice Adams with an introduction by Victoria Wilson (2019)
