= Katrina Kenison =

American author of literary memoir and nonfiction

Katrina Kenison is an American author of literary memoir and nonfiction about parenting, life stages, mindfulness, and simplicity. Her first book, Mitten Strings for God: Reflections for Mothers in a Hurry, published in 2000, encourages parents of young children to restore balance and stillness to lives often spent on the run. "Inspirational and life-affirming, it offers reminders of what is of lasting value, such as grace, love, tranquility." In 2009, Kenison published The Gift of an Ordinary Day: A Mother's Memoir, an exploration of the challenges and rewards of parenting adolescents. Her memoir Magical Journey: An Apprenticeship in Contentment, published in January 2013, is a personal account of the losses and lessons of the second half of life. Kenison is also the author, with Rolf Gates, of Meditations from the Mat: Daily Reflections on the Path of Yoga. A graduate of Smith College, she lives in New Hampshire with her husband, Steven Lewers, and is the mother of two grown sons. She is a yoga instructor and a Reiki practitioner.

"I've come to see paying attention as a spiritual practice," Kenison says. "I write to remind myself that life's seemingly mundane moments are often where we find beauty, grace, and transformation. When we race through life, we miss it."

A former literary editor at Houghton Mifflin, Kenison published works by Olive Ann Burns, Calvin Trillin, Jane Hamilton, Donald Hall, Thomas Mallon, Bruce Duffy, and others. She became the fourth series editor of the Best American Short Stories in 1990, a post she held through 2006. She co-edited, with John Updike, The Best Short Stories of the Century (1999). Kenison's work has appeared in O, the Oprah Magazine, Real Simple, Woman's Day, Parenting, FamilyFun, Health, and other publications.

== Bibliography ==
- Magical Journey: An Apprenticeship in Contentment, Grand Central Publishing, 2013.
- The Gift of an Ordinary Day: A Mother's Memoir, Grand Central Publishing, 2009. According to WorldCat, the book is held in 436 libraries
- The Best American Short Stories 2006, edited with Ann Patchett, Houghton Mifflin Company, 2007
- The Best American Short Stories 2005, edited with Michael Chabon, Houghton Mifflin Company, 2006
- The Best American Short Stories 2004, edited with Lorrie Moore, Houghton Mifflin Company, 2005
- The Best American Short Stories 2003, edited with Walter Mosley, Houghton Mifflin Company, 2004
- The Best American Short Stories 2002, edited with Sue Miller, Houghton Mifflin Company, 2003
- Meditations from the Mat: Daily Reflections on the Path of Yoga, with Rolf Gates, Anchor Books: Random House, 2002
- The Best American Short Stories 2001, edited with Barbara Kingsolver, Houghton Mifflin Company, 2002
- The Best American Short Stories 2000, edited with E. L. Doctorow, Houghton Mifflin Company, 2001
- Mitten Strings for God: Reflections for Mothers in a Hurry, Grand Central Publishing, 2000
- The Best American Short Stories 1999, edited with Amy Tan, Houghton Mifflin Company, 2000
- The Best American Short Stories of the Century, edited with John Updike, Houghton Mifflin Company, 1999 According to WorldCat, the book is held in 2054 libraries
- The Best American Short Stories 1998, edited with Garrison Keillor, Houghton Mifflin Company, 1999
- The Best American Short Stories 1997, edited with Annie Proulx, Houghton Mifflin Company, 1998
- The Best American Short Stories 1996, edited with John Edgar Wideman, Houghton Mifflin Company, 1997
- Mothers: Twenty Stories of Contemporary Motherhood, edited with Kathleen Hirsch, North Point Press: Farrar, Straus and Giroux, 1996
- The Best American Short Stories 1995, edited with Jane Smiley, Houghton Mifflin Company, 1996
- The Best American Short Stories 1994, edited with Tobias Wolff, Houghton Mifflin Company, 1995
- The Best American Short Stories 1993, edited with Louise Erdrich, Houghton Mifflin Company, 1994
- The Best American Short Stories 1992, edited with Robert Stone, Houghton Mifflin Company, 1993
- Leaving Cold Sassy: The Unfinished Sequel to Cold Sassy Tree by Olive Ann Burns, with a reminiscence by Katrina Kenison, Ticknor & Fields: Houghton Mifflin Company, 1992
- The Best American Short Stories 1991, edited with Alice Adams, Houghton Mifflin Company, 1992
