= Art Seidenbaum Award for First Fiction =

Annual English-language literary award for debut novels

- Country: United States
- Status: Active
- First award: 1991

The Art Seidenbaum Award for First Fiction, established in 1991, is a category of the Los Angeles Times Book Prize awarded to authors' debut books of fiction. It is named for the Los Angeles Times' critic Art Seidenbaum, who was also an author and editor. Works are eligible during the year of their first US publication in English, though they may be written originally in languages other than English.

== Recipients ==
Art Seidenbaum Award for First Fiction winners and finalists
Year	Author	Title	Result	Ref.
1991	David Wong Louie	Pangs of Love	Winner	
1991	Louis Begley	Wartime Lies	Finalist	
1991	Louis Edwards	Ten Seconds	Finalist	
1991	Nico Ricci	The Book Of Saints	Finalist	
1991	Whitney Otto	How To Make An American Quilt	Finalist	
1992	Darryl Pinckney	High Cotton	Winner	
1992	Jane Shapiro	After Moondog	Finalist	
1992	Linda Svendsen	Marine Life	Finalist	
1992	Thulani Davis	1959	Finalist	
1992	Wally Lamb	She's Come Undone	Finalist	
1993	Paul Kafka	Love	Winner	
1993	Amy Bloom	Come To Me	Finalist	
1993	Judy Troy	Mourning Doves	Finalist	
1993	Laura Esquivel	Like Water For Chocolate	Finalist	
1993	Rita Ciresi	Mother Rocket	Finalist	
1994	Martin Milan Šimečka	The Year of the Frog	Winner	
1994	Alain de Botton	On Love	Finalist	
1994	Graciela Limon	In Search Of Bernabé	Finalist	
1994	Jose Barreiro	The Indian Chronicles	Finalist	
1994	Sandra Benitez	A Place Where The Sea Remembers	Finalist	
1995	Mark Merlis	American Studies	Winner	
1995	A. J. Verdelle	The Good Negresse	Finalist	
1995	Andrew Solomon	A Stone Boat	Finalist	
1995	Charles D'Ambrosio	The Point	Finalist	
1995	Mukul Kesavan	Looking Through The Glass	Finalist	
1996	Mark Behr	The Smell of Apples	Winner	
1996	Mark Winegardner	The Veracruz Blues	Finalist	
1996	Daniel Akst	St. Burl's Obituary	Finalist	
1996	Jose Raul Bernardo	The Secret Of The Bulls	Finalist	
1996	Judith Farr	I Never Came To You In White	Finalist	
1996	John Lanchester	The Debt To Pleasure	Finalist	
1996	Eoin McNamee	Resurrection Man	Finalist	
1996	Jane Mendelsohn	I Was Amelia Earhart	Finalist	
1997	Carolyn Ferrell	Don't Erase Me: Stories	Winner	
1997	Suzanne Berne	A Crime In The Neighborhood	Finalist	
1997	Michelle Huneven	Round Rock	Finalist	
1997	Tara Ison	A Child Out Of Alcatraz	Finalist	
1997	Arundhati Roy	The God Of Small Things	Finalist	
1998	C. S. Godshalk	Kalimantaan	Winner	
1998	Lan Samantha Chang	Hunger: A Novella and Stories	Finalist	
1998	Samantha Gillison	The Undiscovered Country	Finalist	
1998	Nicholas Papandreou	A Crowded Heart	Finalist	
1998	Bart Schneider	Blue Bossa	Finalist	
1999	Elizabeth Strout	Amy and Isabelle	Winner	
1999	Galaxy Craze	By the Shore	Finalist	
1999	Nathan Englander	For the Relief of Unbearable Urges	Finalist	
1999	Jhumpa Lahiri	Interpreter Of Maladies	Finalist	
1999	Jenny Offill	The Last Things	Finalist	
2000	Pankaj Mishra	The Romantics	Winner	
2000	Helen DeWitt	The Last Samurai	Finalist	
2000	Matthew Klam	Sam the Cat and other stories	Finalist	
2000	Akhil Sharma	An Obedient Father	Finalist	
2000	Zadie Smith	White Teeth	Finalist	
2001	Rachel Seiffert	The Dark Room	Winner	
2001	Manil Suri	The Death of Vishnu	Finalist	
2001	Nuala O'Faolain	My Dream Of You	Finalist	
2001	Nani Power	Crawling At Night	Finalist	
2001	John Wray	The Right Hand Of Sleep	Finalist	
2002	Arthur Phillips	Prague	Winner	
2002	Jay Basu	The Stars Can Wait	Finalist	
2002	Jonathan Safran Foer	Everything Is Illuminated	Finalist	
2002	Nicole Krauss	Man Walks Into A Room	Finalist	
2002	Hari Kunzru	The Impressionist	Finalist	
2003	Mark Haddon	The Curious Incident of the Dog in the Night-Time	Winner	
2003	Monica Ali	Brick Lane	Finalist	
2003	David Marshall Chan	Goblin Fruit:Stories	Finalist	
2003	John Murray	A Few Short Notes On Tropical Butterflies: Stories	Finalist	
2003	Lara Vapnyar	There Are Jews In My House	Finalist	
2004	Lorraine Adams	Harbor	Winner	
2004	Pete Duval	Rear View	Finalist	
2004	David Bezmogis	Natasha and other stories	Finalist	
2004	Susan Fletcher	Eve Green	Finalist	
2004	Lisa Glatt	A Girl Becomes A Comma Like That	Finalist	
2005	Uzodinma Iweala	Beasts of No Nation	Winner	
2005	Kirstin Allio	Garner	Finalist	
2005	Karen Fisher	A Sudden Country	Finalist	
2005	Olga Grushin	The Dream Life Of Sukhanov	Finalist	
2005	Marlon James	John Crow's Devil	Finalist	
2006	Alice Greenway	White Ghost Girls	Winner	
2006	Jennifer Gilmore	Golden Country	Finalist	
2006	Lisa Fugard	Skinner’s Drift	Finalist	
2006	Tony D'Souza	Whiteman	Finalist	
2006	Janis Cooke Newman	Mary	Finalist	
2007	Dinaw Mengestu	The Beautiful Things That Heaven Bears	Winner	
2007	Ellen Litman	The Last Chicken in America	Finalist	
2007	Antonia Arslan	Skylark Farm	Finalist	
2007	Pamela Erens	The Understory	Finalist	
2007	Rebecca Curtis	Twenty Grand: and Other Tales of Love and Money	Finalist	
2008	Zoë Ferraris	Finding Nouf	Winner	
2008	Roma Tearne	Mosquito	Finalist	
2008	Uwem Akpan	Say You're One Of Them	Finalist	
2008	Sadie Jones	The Outcast	Finalist	
2008	David Wroblewski	The Story of Edgar Sawtelle	Finalist	
2009	Philipp Meyer	American Rust	Winner	
2009	Daniyal Mueenuddin	In Other Rooms, Other Wonders	Finalist	
2009	Paul Harding	Tinkers	Finalist	
2009	Petina Gappah	An Elegy For Easterly	Finalist	
2009	Wells Tower	Everything Ravaged, Everything Burned	Finalist	
2010	Peter Bognanni	The House of Tomorrow	Winner	
2010	Christine Sneed	Portraits of a Few of the People I’ve Made Cry	Finalist	
2010	Michael Sledge	The More I Owe You	Finalist	
2010	Tatjana Soli	The Lotus Eaters	Finalist	
2010	Leslie Jamison	The Gin Closet	Finalist	
2011	Ismet Prcic	Shards	Winner	
2011	Ben Lerner	Leaving the Atocha Station	Finalist	
2011	Eleanor Henderson	Ten Thousand Saints	Finalist	
2011	Chad Harbach	The Art Of Fielding	Finalist	
2011	James Wallenstein	The Arriviste	Finalist	
2012	Maggie Shipstead	Seating Arrangements	Winner	
2012	David Abrams	Fobbit	Finalist	
2012	Kevin P. Keating	The Natural Order Of Things	Finalist	
2012	Lydia Netzer	Shine Shine Shine	Finalist	
2012	Robin Sloan	Mr. Penumbra's 24-Hour Bookstore	Finalist	
2013	NoViolet Bulawayo	We Need New Names	Winner	
2013	Jamie Quatro	I Want To Show You More	Finalist	
2013	Jeff Jackson	Mira Corpora	Finalist	
2013	Fiona McFarlane	The Night Guest	Finalist	
2013	Ethan Rutherford	The Peripatetic Coffin and Other Stories	Finalist	
2014	Valeria Luiselli with Christina MacSweeney (trans.)	Faces in the Crowd	Winner	
2014	Eimear McBride	A Girl Is a Half-Formed Thing	Finalist	
2014	Diane Cook	Man V. Nature: Stories	Finalist	
2014	David James Poissant	The Heaven of Animals: Stories	Finalist	
2014	John Darnielle	Wolf in White Van	Finalist	
2015	Chigozie Obioma	The Fishermen	Winner	
2015	Sarah Gerard	Binary Star	Finalist	
2015	Ben Metcalf	Against The Country	Finalist	
2015	Sara Novic	Girl At War	Finalist	
2015	Andrew Roe	The Miracle Girl	Finalist	
2016	Nathan Hill	The Nix	Winner	
2016	Sara Baume	Spill Simmer Falter Wither	Finalist	
2016	Mark Beauregard	Against The Country	Finalist	
2016	Idra Novey	Ways To Disappear	Finalist	
2016	Rebecca Schiff	The Bed Moved	Finalist	
2017	Jenny Zhang	Sour Heart	Winner	
2017	Rachel Khong	Goodbye, Vitamin	Finalist	
2017	Carmen Maria Machado	Her Body and Other Parties	Finalist	
2017	Gabriel Tallent	My Absolute Darling	Finalist	
2017	Elif Batuman	The Idiot	Finalist	
2018	Nafissa Thompson-Spires	Heads of the Colored People	Winner	
2018	Lisa Halliday	Asymmetry	Finalist	
2018	Katya Apekina	The Deeper the Water the Uglier the Fish	Finalist	
2018	R. O. Kwon	The Incendiaries	Finalist	
2018	Tommy Orange	There There	Finalist	
2019	Namwali Serpell	The Old Drift	Winner	
2019	De'Shawn Charles Winslow	In West Mills	Finalist	
2019	Sarah Elaine Smith	Marilou Is Everywhere	Finalist	
2019	Maria Gainza	Optic Nerve	Finalist	
2019	Lila Savage	Say Say Say	Finalist	
2020	Deesha Philyaw	The Secret Lives of Church Ladies	Winner	
2020	Shruti Swamy	A House is a Body: Stories	Finalist	
2020	Meng Jin	Little Gods	Finalist	
2020	Douglas Stuart	Shuggie Bain	Finalist	
2020	Maisy Card	These Ghosts Are Family	Finalist	
2021	Jackie Polzin	Brood	Winner	
2021	Natasha Brown	Assembly	Finalist	
2021	Thomas Grattan	The Recent East	Finalist	
2021	Jocelyn Nicole Johnson	My Monticello: Fiction	Finalist	
2021	Benjamín Labatut with Adrian Nathan West (trans.)	When We Cease to Understand the World	Finalist	
2022	Aamina Ahmad	The Return of Faraz Ali: a novel	Winner	
2022	Maayan Eitan	Love	Finalist	
2022	Sidik Fofana	Stories from the Tenants Downstairs	Finalist	
2022	Oscar Hokeah	Calling for a Blanket Dance	Finalist	
2022	Morgan Thomas	Manywhere: Stories	Finalist	
2023	Shannon Sanders	Company: Stories	Winner	
2023	Stephen Buoro	The Five Sorrowful Mysteries of Andy Africa: A Novel	Finalist	
2023	Sheena Patel	I'm a Fan: A Novel	Finalist	
2023	James Frankie Thomas	Idlewild: A Novel	Finalist	
2023	Ghassan Zeineddine	Dearborn	Finalist	
2024	Jiaming Tang	Cinema Love	Winner	
2024	Pemi Aguda	Ghostroots: Stories	Finalist	
2024	Joseph Earl Thomas	God Bless You, Otis Spunkmeyer	Finalist	
2024	Jessica Elisheva Emerson	Olive Days	Finalist	
2024	Julian Zabalbeascoa	What We Tried to Bury Grows Here	Finalist	
2025	Justin Haynes	Ibis: A Novel	Winner	
2025	Andy Anderegg	Plum	Finalist	
2025	Krystelle Bamford	Idle Grounds: A Novel	Finalist	
2025	Addie E. Citchens	Dominion: A Novel	Finalist	
2025	Saou Ichikawa	Hunchback: A Novel	Finalist	
