= Malaysian Americans =

Americans of Malaysian birth or descent

Orang Amerika Malaysia اورڠ امريکا مليسيا 马来西亚裔美国人 (Chinese) மலேசிய அமெரிக்கர்கள் (Tamil)
- Malaysian-Americans at a Deepavali (Diwali) festival in Pennsylvania.

Total population
- 48,179 (2023)

Regions with significant populations
- New York City Metropolitan Area, San Francisco Bay Area, Los Angeles Metropolitan Area, Houston Metropolitan Area, Seattle Metropolitan Area, Illinois, Indiana, Arizona, Virginia, Ohio, Colorado, Honolulu, Washington, D.C., Minneapolis, Nashville and Dallas

Languages
- American English, Malay, and other minority languages: Chinese, Tamil, Cantonese, Hokkien, Telugu, and Malayalam

Religion
- Islam, Christianity, Buddhism, Hinduism, Sikhism

Related ethnic groups
- Americans, Indonesian Americans, Singaporean Americans

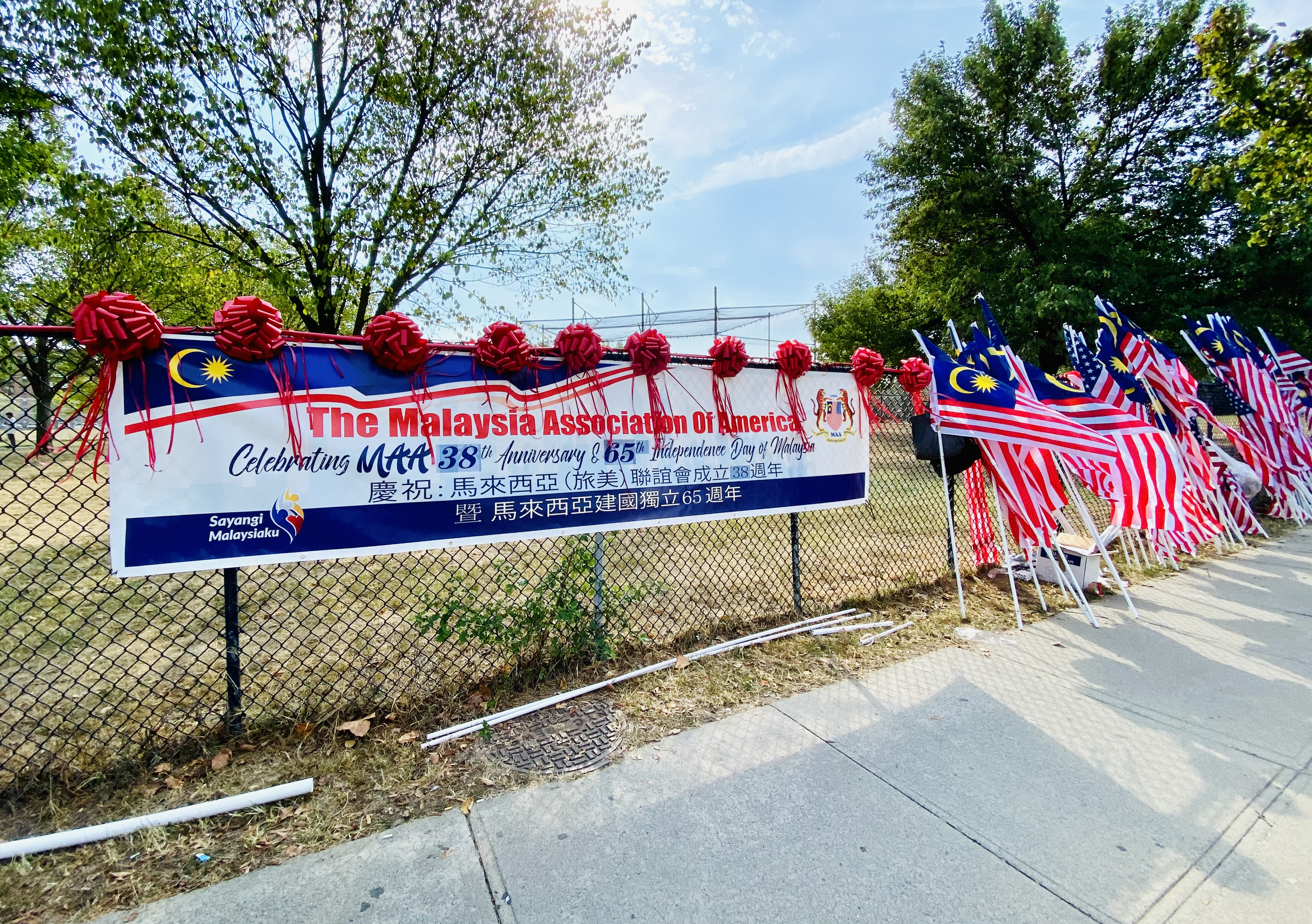
The Malaysian Association of America celebrating 38th anniversary and 65th Independence Day of Malaysia in Flushing, NY

Malaysian Americans (Malay: Orang Amerika Malaysia, Jawi: اورڠ امريکا مليسيا) are Americans of Malaysian ancestry. Rather than a single ethnic group, Malaysian Americans descend from a variety of ethnic groups that inhabit the Southeast Asian country of Malaysia, all of which speak different languages and profess different cultures and beliefs, including Malay, Chinese and Tamil, as Malaysian is primarily a national identification. According to answers provided to an open-ended question included in the 2019 US Census, 38,227 people said that their ancestry or ethnic origin was Malaysian.

== History and associations ==
In the 1930 census, 96 Americans identified themselves as "Malay" racially.

Malaysians have been coming to New York City, the West Coast of the U.S., and Chicago since the 1970s for job and educational opportunities, partly because of political and economic tensions in Malaysia. Although some students later found jobs in U.S. companies, many students from Chicago returned to Malaysia after their education ended. Community leaders in 2001 estimated that the Malaysian population of metropolitan Chicago had decreased to 600-700 individuals.

There are three Malaysian government offices in the U.S. whose goal is to assist and supervise Malaysian students. One of them is the Malaysian Student Department (MSD) in Evanston, Illinois, which covers the midwestern part of the U.S. MSD sponsors several events each year for students in the region, including the celebration of Malaysian independence, the Midwest Games (a three-day sporting competition), and Ambassador Award Night, whose function is recognizing the academic achievements of Malaysian students.

Malaysian Americans have created several community associations in the U.S. The Malaysian American Society was founded in 1967 to promote cultural exchanges between Malaysia and the U.S. Other community organizations include the Malaysian Association of Georgia and the Malaysian Association of Southern California.

Malaysian Americans also have created several educational associations. The National Assembly of Malaysian Students in America acts as an umbrella organizations for several Malaysian Students in America. The Malaysian Students Association at the University of Michigan fosters friendships among Malaysian students. The objective of the Malaysia Student Association of St. Louis, Missouri is to maintain close relationships among students after their college graduation. The Malaysian Students Association at Ohio State University is an organization that represents the Malaysian student community while promoting Malaysia's unique cultural identity at Ohio State. Other educational associations include the University of California-Berkeley Alumni Club of Malaysia and the Harvard Club of Malaysia plus associations at the Illinois Institute of Technology and the University of Chicago.

== Demographics ==
The top 15 counties of settlement for Malaysian immigrants from 2015 - 2019 out of a national total of 76,500 were:

No	County	Population
1	Queens, NY	4,100
2	Los Angeles County, California	3,600
3	Santa Clara County, California	2,800
4	Brooklyn, New York	2,100
5	Manhattan, New York	2,000
6	King County, Washington	2,000
7	Orange County, California	1,900
8	Harris County, Texas	1,900
9	Alameda County, California	1,800
10	Marion County, Indiana	1,600
11	Cook County, Illinois	1,400
12	Maricopa County, Arizona	1,200
13	San Mateo County, California	1,100
14	Fort Bend County, Texas	1,000
15	Fairfax County, Virginia	1,000

== Socioeconomics & Culture ==
The Malaysia Association of America, based in the area of the Chinatown, Flushing in New York City, was credited by the Consul General of Malaysia in New York for getting the New York State Assembly to declare August 31, 2008, to be "Malaysian American Day".

In 2018, Jocelyn Yow, at the age of 23, became the first Malaysian American to be elected to public office in the United States. She is currently serving as the Mayor Pro Tem for the City of Eastvale in Riverside County, California.

== Malaysian Islamic Study Group ==
The Malaysian Islamic Study Group (MISG) was founded in Peoria, Illinois in 1976 with the main objective to assist the Malaysian students in walking the path of success while they are in America/Canada, fulfilling their responsibilities as students, as members of their communities and as servants of Allah.

After more than 30 years of its establishment, MISG has a sizeable number of members in almost each university in America which has Malaysian students.

In relation to all the other Islamic organizations in America, MISG is viewed as a foreigners-based Muslim student group that emerged from the Islamic Society of North America. Despite claims that MISG's founding was influenced by the ideology of Abul Ala Maududi, no evidence indicates such opinions. MISG is by and large an independent organization without binding allegiances to any other organizations.

== Notable people ==
- Isaac Angking, soccer player in United States and for Puerto Rico national team, Malaysian descent
- Isabel Atkin, British-American skier, bronze medal in slopestyle at 2018 Winter Olympics for Great Britain, Malaysian mother
- Zoe Atkin, British-American skier, bronze medal in halfpipe at 2026 Winter Olympics for Great Britain, Malaysian mother
- Ross Butler, Singaporean-American actor, Chinese Malaysian mother
- Ronny Chieng, comedian on The Daily Show, born in Malaysia
- Malay (Ho), Grammy award-winning producer of Frank Ocean’s Channel Orange, Malaysian father
- Maria Kang, fitness advocate
- Rachel Khong, author of Goodbye, Vitamin and Real Americans
- Wan Kuzain, soccer player in USL Championship known as “Malaysian Messi,” Malaysian parents
- Wan Kuzri, soccer player in the USL League Two and Malaysia Super League, Malaysian parents
- Kwan Kew Lai, doctor and Ebola survivor
- Hock Lai Lee, badminton player
- Sandra Lee, dermatologist known as Dr. Pimple Popper, Malaysian mother
- Adele Lim, screenwriter of Crazy Rich Asians and Raya and the Last Dragon, born in Malaysia
- Anita Lo, chef and restaurateur
- Nigel Ng, YouTuber and comedian, born in Malaysia
- Jennifer Phang, filmmaker
- Aaron Phillips, MMA fighter
- Aruwin Salehhuddin, ski racer and first female athlete to represent Malaysia at the Winter Olympics
- Hock Tan, CEO of Broadcom, born in Malaysia
- Lip-Bu Tan, CEO of Intel
- Phil Tan, Grammy award-winning audio engineer for projects with Mariah Carey, Ludacris, and Rihanna
- Manika (Ward), singer
- Ming-Na Wen, actress
- Michelle Yeoh, Academy award-winning actress, born in Malaysia
- Mike Yin, businessman and politician
- Amos Yong, Pentecostal theologian born in Malaysia
- Jocelyn Yow, first Malaysian American to hold public office, Chinese Malaysian parents
- Yuna (Zara’ai), pop singer born in Malaysia

== See also ==
- Malaysia–United States relations
- Malaysian Canadians
