= Idlewild =

Idlewild, also spelled Idlewyld, Idyllwild, Idyllwyld, Idylwild, or Idylwyld might refer to:

== Film ==
- Idlewild (film), an American musical film released in 2006

== Literature ==
- Idlewild, a 1995 novel by Mark Lawson
- Idlewild, the quiet meeting place in Lucy Maud Montgomery's Anne of Green Gables
- Idlewild (novel), a 2003 novel by Nick Sagan
- Idlewild, a 2023 novel by James Frankie Thomas

== Music ==
- Idlewild (band), Scottish rock band
- Idlewild (Everything but the Girl album), 1988
- Idlewild (Idlewild album), 2025
- Idlewild (Outkast album), companion album to the 2006 film
- Idlewild (They Might Be Giants album), 2014 compilation
- "Idlewild", a song by Travis featuring Josephine Oniyama from their 2016 album Everything at Once
- "Idlewild", a song by Gretchen Peters from her 2012 album Hello Cruel World
- "Idlewild", a song by Robbie Williams from his 2019 album The Christmas Present
- Idlewild Records, a record label
- Idlewild South, 1970 Allman Brothers album

== Places ==
=== Locations in the United States ===
==== Populated places in California ====
- Idlewild, Placer County, California
- Idlewild, Tulare County, California
- Idyllwild-Pine Cove, California, one of a group of unincorporated communities in Riverside County

==== Other populated places in the United States ====
- Idlewild Airport, the original name of John F. Kennedy International Airport in New York City
- Idlewild, Georgia, a fictional town in the 2006 film Idlewild
- Idlewild, Kentucky, an unincorporated community
- Idlewild, Michigan, a western Michigan community and former resort, known as "Black Eden" in the early 20th century
- Idlewild, Missouri, an unincorporated community
- Idlewild, Tennessee, an unincorporated community
- Idlewild, Wisconsin, an unincorporated community
- Idlewild and Soak Zone, an amusement park in Ligonier Township, Pennsylvania
- Ski Idlewild, an abandoned ski area in downtown Winter Park, Colorado
- Idylwild Wildlife Management Area in Maryland

=== Historic sites in the United States ===
- Idlewild (Talladega, Alabama), listed on the NRHP in Talladega County, Alabama
- Idlewilde (Indian Springs, Georgia), listed on the NRHP in Butts County, Georgia
- Idlewild (Trenton, Kentucky), listed on the NRHP in Todd County, Kentucky
- Idlewild (Patterson, Louisiana), listed on the NRHP in St. Mary Parish, Louisiana
- Idlewild Historic District (Idlewild, Michigan), listed on the NRHP in Michigan
- Idlewild (Port Gibson, Mississippi), listed on the NRHP in Claiborne County, Mississippi
- Idlewild, a home in Cornwall-on-Hudson, New York, built by Nathaniel Parker Willis
- Dr. Franklin King House-Idlewild, Eden, North Carolina, listed on the NRHP in Rockingham County, North Carolina
- Idlewild Farm Complex, Bryn Mawr, Pennsylvania, listed on the NRHP in Pennsylvania
- Idlewild (Media, Pennsylvania), summer cottage of architect Frank Furness
- Idlewild Historic District (Memphis, Tennessee), listed on the NRHP in Shelby County, Tennessee
- Idlewild Mansion (Fredericksburg, VA), Virginia's Landmark Registry
- Idlewild (Fredericksburg, Virginia), a historic home located at Fredericksburg, Virginia

=== Locations in Canada ===
- Idylwylde, Edmonton, a neighborhood in Edmonton, Alberta, Canada
- Idylwild Park, a former park in Ontario
- Idylwyld Drive, a road in Saskatoon, Saskatchewan

== Other uses ==
- Belle of Louisville or Idlewild, a steamboat
- Idlewild, a screensaver included with the Windows Entertainment Pack
- Idyllwild Arts Foundation in Idyllwild, California
  - Idyllwild Arts Academy, a private school operated by the Idyllwild Arts Foundation
