= The Ruby (space) =

Community space in San Francisco

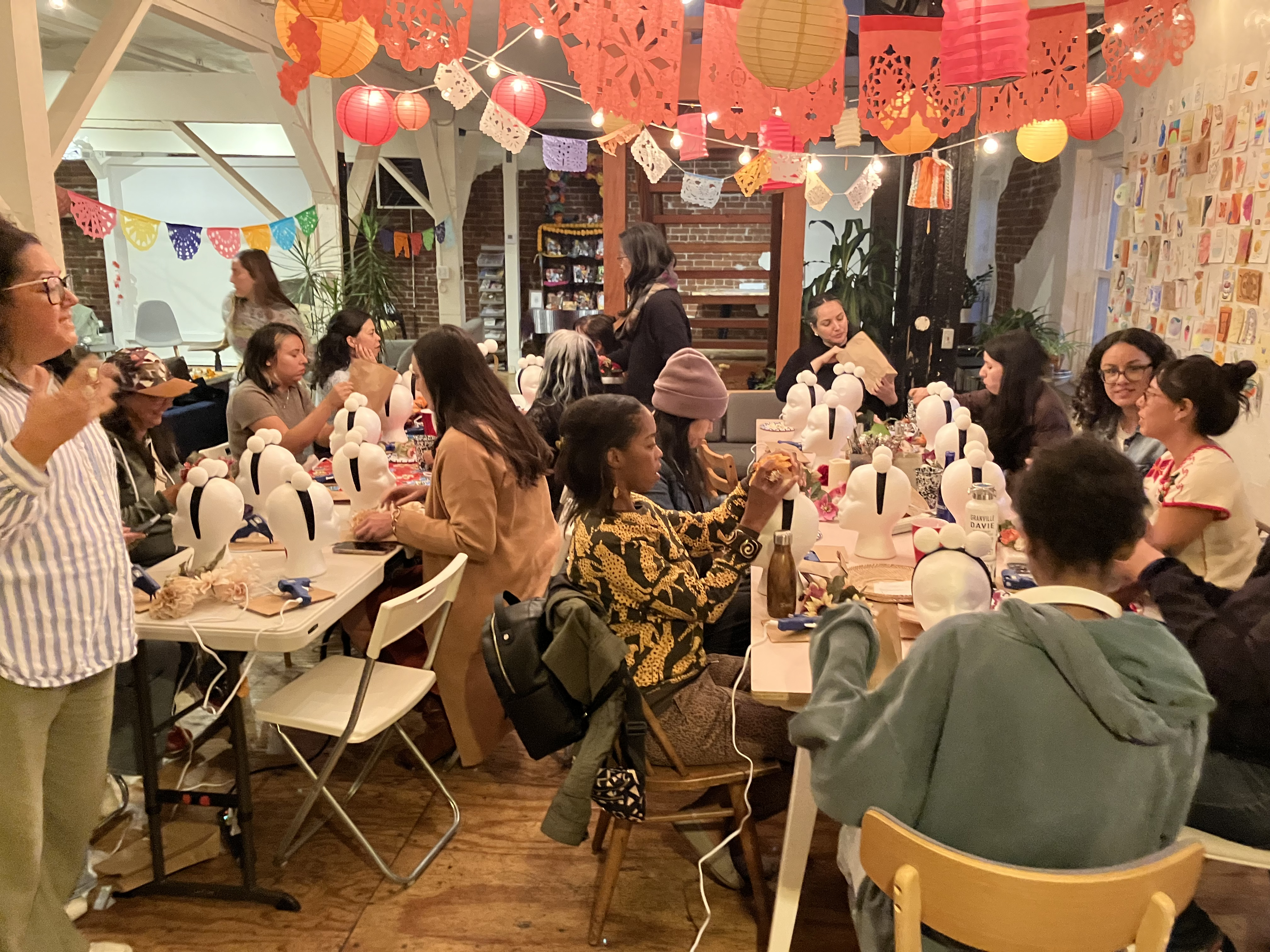
- An art workshop with the Marigold Project in commemoration of Día de los Muertos
- Formation: 2018
- Location: San Francisco, California
- Members: 130
- Founder: Rachel Khong
- Director: Peggy Lee
- Website: Official website

The Ruby is a work and event space in the Mission District, San Francisco, with goals of building community and supporting creative work. It describes itself as offering membership to nonbinary, transfeminine and woman-identified creatives. It was founded in 2018 by author Rachel Khong. In addition to providing a coworking space for artists and writers, it hosts classes, workshops, meals, public events, volunteer opportunities, and other cultural programming for members and the public.

== Programs ==
The Ruby is a collective community project and co-working space, with the intention of a different atmosphere than co-working spaces that are tech-focused according to Khong. Stevie Stacionis, a business owner in Oakland, described it as a "gritty, open-minded co-working space, where vulnerable conversations about race, politics, literature and motherhood take place over spritzes and noodles" after hosting a wine event at the Ruby.

With a previous career that involved both food and the arts, Khong wanted to make "food and beverage programming a crucial element" in the Ruby. Every other Friday, the Ruby invites local chefs from various culinary backgrounds to prepare meals for its members, including cuisine styles such as Vietnamese, Mexican, Indonesian, Ethiopian, Malaysian, and Native American. For happy hours every other Friday, the Ruby hosts makers specializing in a variety of drinks, particularly women and non-binary winemakers.

Other programming includes clubs, including a book club and a writing club, and occasional events by members and individuals from the broader San Francisco community. On-site, the Ruby has a rolodex where individuals can look each other up for networking purposes. Online, the Ruby provides an online rolodex for businesses owned by women and non-binary people. In 2024 the Ruby hosted a fundraiser for the family of a local business owner.

== History ==
After graduating from the University of Florida's MFA program, Khong moved to San Francisco and worked at Lucky Peach, a food magazine co-created by David Chang. She then began writing her debut novel, Goodbye, Vitamin, which was later published in 2017, and started writing her second novel, Real Americans, in December 2016 after witnessing the Donald Trump 2016 presidential campaign. Shortly after, the Lucky Peach magazine shuttered. From then on, Khong focused on her writing, hopping from cafe to cafe to write, though she found herself unsatisfied by their lack of community.

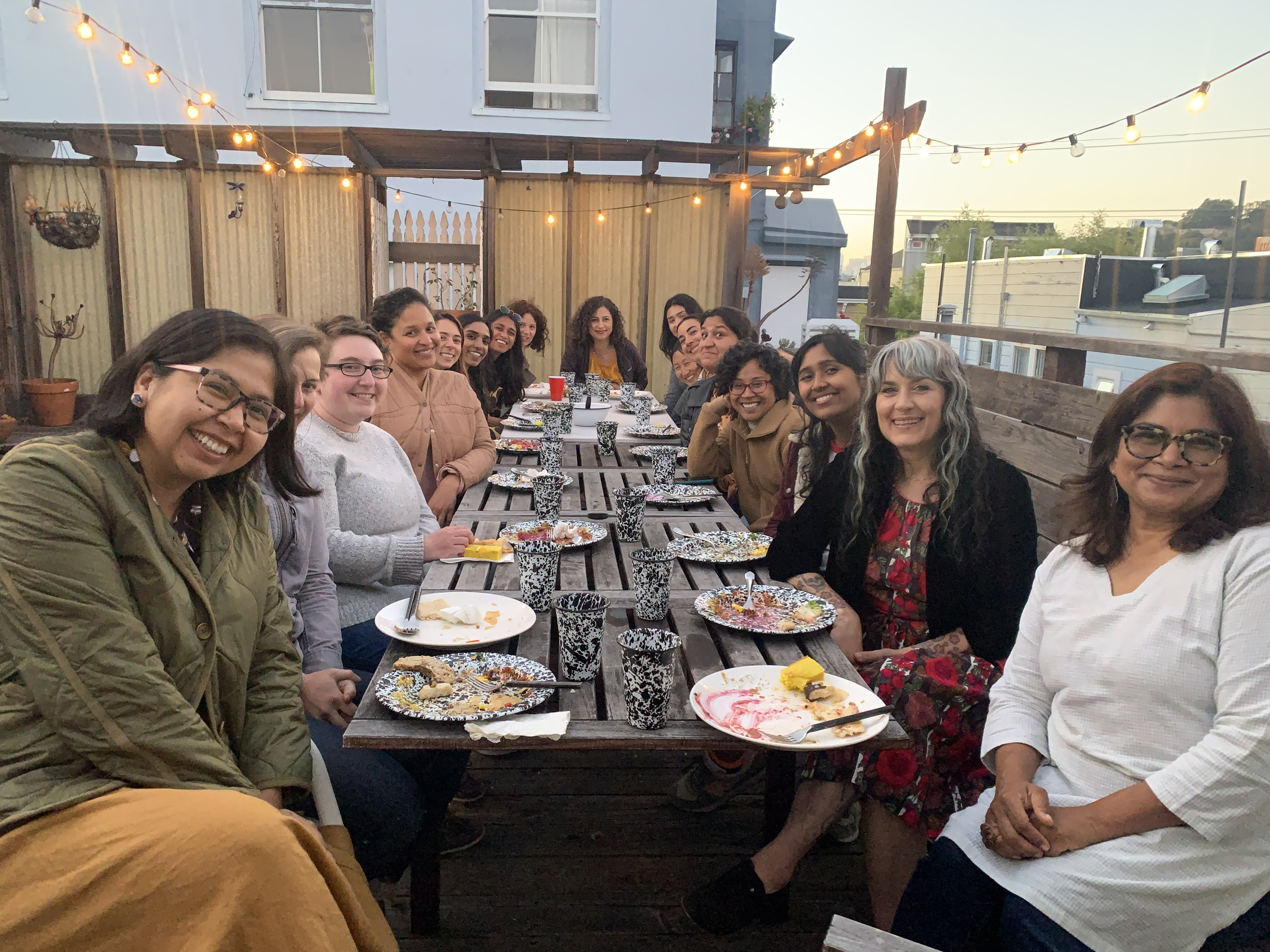
A cookbook club celebration for Reem Assil's Arabiyya.

Khong then thought a lot about the nature of the community in the city, which spurred her to establish the Ruby, intended as a collective space for women and non-binary people. She took inspiration from other co-working spaces in the city, specifically the Makeshift Society in Hayes Valley that closed in 2016. After finding the space for the Ruby—a 3,800 square foot building—Khong gathered 50 people who helped her design and furnish it. The Ruby opened in 2018.

Over time, Khong acquired works of art by local members to continue decorating the Ruby space with. During the COVID-19 pandemic, Khong hosted virtual programming like book clubs and movie clubs. To keep her lease, Khong briefly rented the Ruby space out to Something Labs, an organization focused on personal protective equipment. In 2021, Khong retired from managing the space and moved to Los Angeles. Peggy Lee, who was one of the founding members, became the director of the Ruby.

Six months after it was established, the Ruby had over 130 members according to Bon Appétit. Past and present Ruby members include Meng Jin, R. O. Kwon, Mimi Lok, Rita Bullwinkel, Esmé Weijun Wang, C. Pam Zhang, Cecilia Rabess, Gabriela Garcia, and Shruti Swamy. Events have included Crystal Hana Kim and collaborations with Litquake. Writers in Residence at the Ruby have included Nicole Chung and Mimi Tempestt.

In 2020, Built In San Francisco recommended the Ruby in an article listing five women's co-working spaces in San Francisco.
