= Mariya Kuznetsova =

Maria or Mariya Kuznetsova (Russian: Мария Кузнецова) may refer to:

- Maria Kuznetsova (novelist), Ukrainian American novelist
- Mariya Kuznetsova (wrestler) (born 1997), Russian wrestler
- Mariya Kuznetsova (actress) (born 1950), Russian actress in the 2001 film Taurus
- Mariya Kuznetsova (singer) (1880–1966), Russian opera singer and dancer
- Mariya Kuznetsova (pilot) (1918–1990), Soviet fighter pilot

== See also ==
- Maria Kouznetsova (violinist) (born 1991), Russian violinist
