= Asymmetric =

Asymmetric may refer to:

- Asymmetry in geometry, chemistry, and physics

== Computing ==
- Asymmetric cryptography, in public-key cryptography
- Asymmetric digital subscriber line, Internet connectivity
- Asymmetric multiprocessing, in computer architecture

== Other ==
- Asymmetric relation, in set theory
- Asymmetric synthesis, in organic synthesis
- Asymmetric warfare, in modern war
- Asymmetric Publications, a video game company
- Asymmetry (Mallory Knox album), 2014
- Asymmetry (Karnivool album), 2013
- Asymmetry (population ethics)
- Asymmetry (novel), a 2018 novel by Lisa Halliday
