= The Best American Short Stories 2020 =

2019 short story collection

- Editor: Curtis Sittenfeld and Heidi Pitlor
- Language: English
- Series: The Best American Short Stories
- Published: 2020
- Publisher: Houghton Mifflin Harcourt
- Media type: Print (hardback & paperback)
- ISBN: 9781328485366 (hardback)
- Preceded by: The Best American Short Stories 2019
- Followed by: The Best American Short Stories 2021

The Best American Short Stories 2020 is a volume in the annual Best American Short Stories anthology. It was edited by the series editor, Heidi Pitlor, and guest editor Curtis Sittenfeld.

== Short stories included ==
Author	Title	First published
Selena Anderson	"Godmother Tea"	Oxford American (September 3, 2019)
T. C. Boyle	"The Apartment"	McSweeney's (Nr. 56, 2019)
Jason Brown	"A Faithful But Melancholy Account of Several Barbarities Lately Committed"	The Sewanee Review (December 2019)
Michael Byers	"Sibling Rivalry"	Lady Churchill's Rosebud Wristlet (issue 40, 2019)
Emma Cline	"The Nanny"	The Paris Review (no.231)
Marion Crotty	"Hallowween"	Crazyhorse (no. 96, 2019)
Carolyn Ferrell	"Something Street"	Story (no. 5, 2019)
Mary Gaitskill	"This is Pleasure"	The New Yorker (July 8, 2019)
Meng Jin	"In the Event"	The Threepenny Review (Issue 159, Fall 2019)
Andrea Lee	"The Children"	The New Yorker (June 10 & 17, 2019)
Sarah Thankam Mathews	"Rubberdust"	Kenyon Review Online (Jan-Feb 2019)
Elizabeth McCracken	"It's Not You"	Zoetrope: All-Story {Vol. 23, no. 3, 2019)
Scott Nadelson	"Liberté"	Chicago Quarterly Review (no. 29, Fall 2019)
Leigh Newman	"Howl Palace"	The Paris Review (no. 230, 2019)
Jane Pek	"The Nine-Tailed Fox Explains"	Witness (Vol. XXXII, no. 1, 2019)>
Alejandro Puyana	"The Hands of Dirty Children"	American Short Fiction (Vol. 22, no. 68)
Anna Reeser	"Octopus VII"	The Threepenny Review (Issue 25, 2019)
William Pei Shih	"Enlightenment"	Virginia Quarterly Review (Vol 95/2, 2019)
Kevin Wilson	"Kennedy"	Subtropics (issue 27, 2019)
Tiphanie Yanique	"The Special World"	The Georgia Review (Winter 2019)
