= I'm a Fan =

I'm a Fan may refer to:

- "I'm a Fan" (song), 2017 song by Pia Mia
- I'm a Fan (novel), 2022 novel by Sheena Patel
