= Foyles Book of the Year =

British literary award (2010s–present)

The Foyles Books of the Year have been announced annually since 2017 by the British bookseller chain Foyles. From 2017 to 2023 they recognised outstanding literature in three categories: Fiction, Non-fiction, and Children's. A fiction award was conferred in 2016, before the other two categories were added. In 2024 the award changed to a combined one for all genres, however this was reverted for the 2025 award.

When announcing the 2023 choices, Foyles said that they chose "our favourite, most interesting, most important, most year-defining titles published, recommended and sold this year".

== Winners (2016 – 2023) ==
=== Fiction ===
Year	Author	Book	Ref
2016	Paul Beatty	The Sellout	
2017	Naomi Alderman	The Power	
2018	Sayaka Murata	Convenience Store Woman	
2019	Ocean Vuong	On Earth We're Briefly Gorgeous	
2020	Brandon Taylor	Real Life	
2021	Natasha Brown	Assembly	
2022	Sheena Patel	I'm a Fan	
2023	R. F. Kuang	Yellowface	

=== Non-fiction ===
Year	Author	Book	Ref
2017	Reni Eddo-Lodge	Why I'm No Longer Talking to White People About Race	
2018	Akala	Natives: Race and Class in the Ruins of Empire	
2019	Lisa Taddeo	Three Women	
2020	Doireann Ní Ghríofa	A Ghost in the Throat	
2021	Warren Ellis	Nina Simone's Gum	
2022	Thomas Halliday	Otherlands: A World in the Making	
2023	Cat Bohannon	Eve: How the Female Body Drove 200 Million Years of Human Evolution	

=== Children's ===
Year	Author	Book	Ref
2017	Elena Favilli	Goodnight Stories for Rebel Girls	
2018	Tomi Adeyemi	Children of Blood and Bone	
2019	Katherine Rundell	The Good Thieves	
2020	Myriam Dahman	The Wolf’s Secret	
2021	Tom Gauld	The Little Wooden Robot and the Log Princess	
2022	S. F. Said	Tyger	
2023	Katherine Rundell	Impossible Creatures	

== Winners and shortlist (2024 – ) ==
=== Combined ===
Year	Author	Book	Result	Ref
2024	Sally Rooney	Intermezzo	Winner	
2024	Gillian Anderson (editor)	Want	Shortlist	
2024	Jonn Elledge	A History of the World in 47 Borders	Shortlist	
2024	Percival Everett	James	Shortlist	
2024	Johnny Flynn and Robert Macfarlane (co-authors), Emily Sutton (illustrator)	The World to Come	Shortlist	
2024	Megan Hopkins	Starminster	Shortlist	
2024	Olga Tokarczuk (author), Antonia Lloyd-Jones (translator)	The Empusium	Shortlist	
2024	Asako Yuzuki (author), Polly Barton (translator)	Butter	Shortlist	

=== Fiction ===
Year	Author	Book	Result	Ref
2025	Vincenzo Latronico	Perfection	Fiction Book of the Year	
2025	Kang Han	We Do Not Part	Shortlist	
2025	Ian McEwan	What We Can Know	Shortlist	
2025	Charlie Porter	Nova Scotia House	Shortlist	
2025	Uketsu	Strange Pictures	Shortlist	

=== Non-fiction ===
Year	Author	Book	Result	Ref
2025	Arundhati Roy	Mother Mary Comes to Me	Book of the Year	
2025	Karen Hao	Empire of AI: Dreams and Nightmares in Sam Altman's OpenAI	Shortlist	
2025	Joseph Nguyen	Don't Believe Everything You Think: Why Your Thinking Is The Beginning & End Of Suffering (Beyond Suffering)	Shortlist	
2025	Patti Smith	Bread of Angels: A Memoir	Shortlist	
2025	Harry Tanner	The Queer Thing About Sin: Why the West Came to Hate Queer Love	Shortlist	

=== Children's ===
Year	Author	Book	Result	Ref
2025	Thomas Halliday	Otherlands: A World in the Making	Children's Book of the Year	
2025	Suzanne Collins	Sunrise on the Reaping	Shortlist	
2025	Anna James	Alice with a Why	Shortlist	
2025	Loes Riphagen	The Gnome Book	Shortlist	
2025	Hannah Tunnicliffe	Detective Stanley and the Mystery at the Museum	Shortlist	
