= Universality (novel) =

2025 novel by Natasha Brown

- Author: Natasha Brown
- Language: English
- Genre: Satire
- Publisher: Faber
- Publication date: 2025
- Publication place: Great Britain
- Media type: Print
- Pages: 176
- Awards: Booker Prize (longlisted)
- ISBN: 9780571389018

Universality is a 2025 satirical novel by Natasha Brown published by Faber. The novel satirizes modern social and political thought. The first third of the novel is a fictional newspaper investigative feature regarding a party where a guest is attacked with a gold bar, with the rest of the novel shifting narration between different characters directly or indirectly involved in the event.

The novel was longlisted for the 2025 Booker Prize.

== Narrative ==
The first third of Universality is a fictional magazine investigative report by young, aspiring journalist Hannah entitled "A Fool's Gold". The work is an expose about a party in a barn in West Yorkshire during the COVID-19 pandemic, during the COVID-19 lockdown in the United Kingdom. The party in the barn, contravening lockdown rules, is hosted by a group of anarchists known as The Universalists, who aspire to form a separate micro-society. During that party, the leader of The Universalists is bludgeoned nearly to death with a gold bar. The gold bar and the barn belonged to London banker Richard, who becomes vilified, losing his job and his home, after the piece is published. The young man who attacked the group leader, a partygoer named Jake, is aimless in life with no goals. His mother is Miriam Leonard (nicknamed Lenny) who is a newspaper columnist for The Telegraph and The Observer. Her columns are on the topics of sex, race, class, politics and social justice. Often, she is critical of progressive, social justice initiatives, being staunchly against diversity, equity and inclusion (DEI) initiatives and writing a book titled No Mo' Woke, critical of wokeness. Lenny's columns are sensationalistic; purposefully written to evoke strong emotions and prey on biases in her readers at the expense of accurate reporting.

After the feature is released, Hannah sees increased success as a journalist, but her fame is limited, quickly fading as modern society moves on to the next fad.

== Reception ==
Writing for The Guardian, Joe Hamya stated that Brown was "one of the most intelligent voices in writing today." Hamya further stated that in this satirical novel, Brown expertly uses the reader's preconceptions and biases to add nuance to the plot. Also writing for The Guardian, Alex Clark observed that Brown expertly illustrated the power dynamics between characters, in a wider society that has gone awry. Writing in The Financial Times, Mia Levitin described the novel as a "nesting doll of satire that leaves readers uncertain where their loyalties lie."
