= Natasha Brown (author) =

British novelist

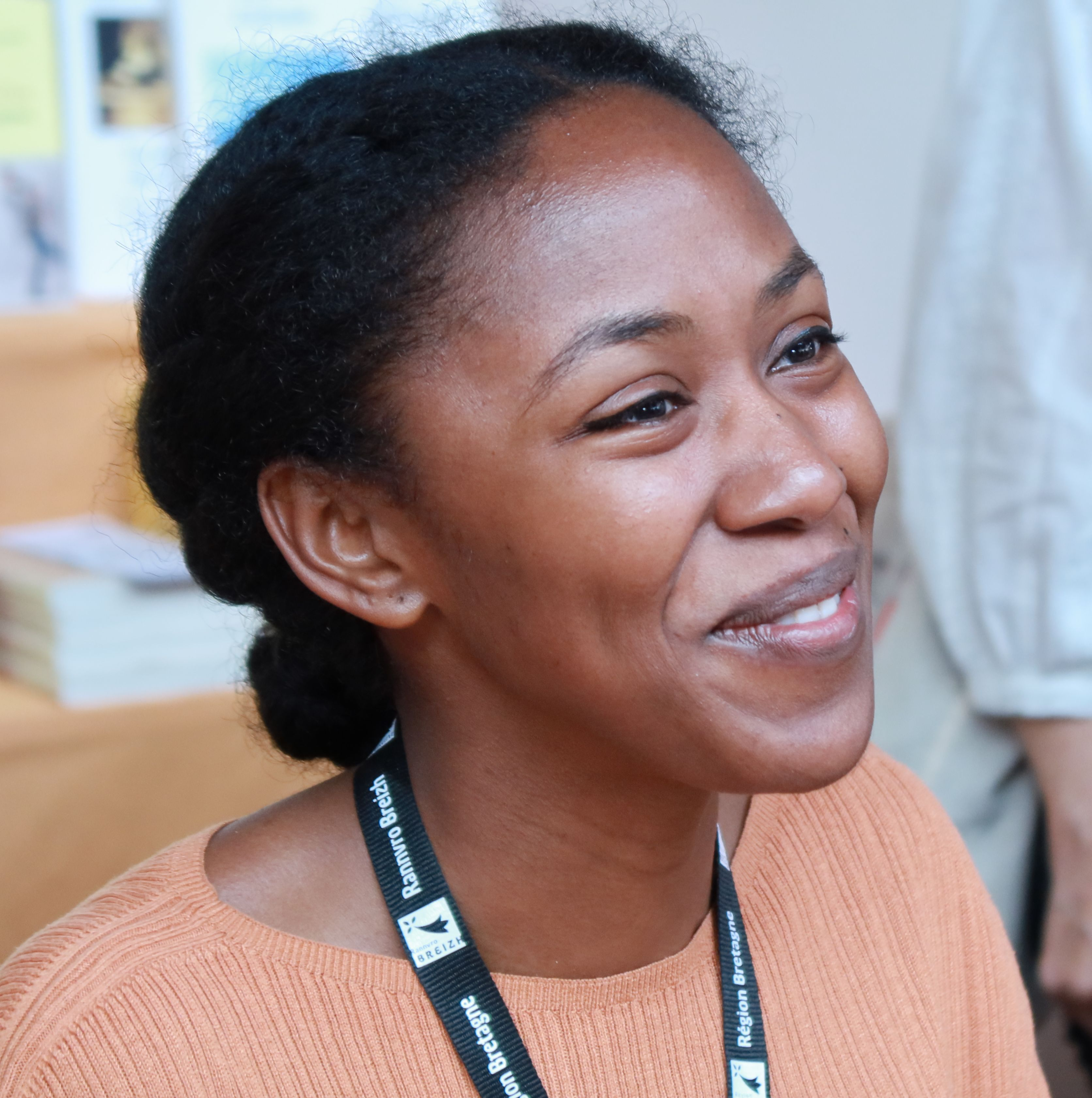
- Brown at the 2023 Étonnants Voyageurs
- Education: University of Cambridge
- Occupation: Novelist
- Writing career
- Language: English
- Notable work: Assembly (2021)
- Notable awards: Foyles BotY—Fiction (2021); Betty Trask Award (2022); Granta Best of Young British Novelists (2023)
- Website: npbrown.com

Natasha Brown is a British writer who lives in London, England. Assembly (2021), her first novel, won a Betty Trask Award, was Foyles Book of the Year (for Fiction), and was shortlisted for several other American, British, and English-language awards. In 2023, she was included on the Granta Best of Young British Novelists list.

== Career ==
Brown spent a decade working in financial services, after studying mathematics at the University of Cambridge.

In 2023, Brown was named on Granta's Best of Young British Novelists list, compiled every 10 years since 1983, identifying the 20 most significant British novelists aged under 40. The judging panel comprised Tash Aw, Rachel Cusk, Brian Dillon and Helen Oyeyemi, chaired by Granta editor Sigrid Rausing.

=== Assembly ===
Brown developed Assembly after receiving a 2019 London Writers Award in the literary fiction category. It was published in hardcover format in the UK through Hamish Hamilton on 3 June 2021; Penguin also released an ebook and audiobook dictated by Pippa Bennett-Warner. Later she released it via Little, Brown and Company in the US on 14 September 2021, along with an ebook.

The novel received acclaim from several publications. Its economy of language is frequently mentioned as one of its strengths, with Brown's tight prose often being described as "precise" and "crisp."

Literary Hub's Emily Temple compiled a comprehensive assessment of critic attitudes towards literature from 2021 calling it an "Ultimate Best Books of 2021 List"; she determined that altogether four mainstream magazines and outlets explicitly named Assemby as a critical or important work on their own platforms' end-of-the-year lists. These consisted of The Guardian's Top Fiction of 2021, Publisher Weekly's Top 10 Books of 2021, The Washington Post's 50 Notable Works of Fiction of 2021 and The Philadelphia Inquirer's Best Books of 2021. It also made an appearance on The Atlantic's 20 Best Books of 2021.

The novel was shortlisted for the Books Are My Bag Readers' Award, Goldsmiths Prize, Art Seidenbaum Award for First Fiction, British Book Award for debut book, Orwell Prize for Political Fiction, and The Writers' Prize (previously the Rathbones Folio Prize); it also won a Betty Trask Award.

=== Other works ===
Brown's second novel, Universality, was published by Faber & Faber on 13 March 2025. Reviewing the novel in The Guardian, Jo Hamya wrote: "Brown is one of our most intelligent voices writing today, able to block out the short-term chatter around both identity and language in order to excavate much more uncomfortable truths." Alex Clark's review described the novel as "terrific", going on to say: "Brown is a talented satirist, for sure, and her commitment to contemporary detail is impressive."

In May 2025, Universality was named as a finalist for the Orwell Prize, and on 29 July 2025, was announced as one of 13 titles on the longlist of the Booker Prize.

In February 2026, Brown was announced as the chair of the judging panel for the International Booker Prize, leading the jury responsible for selecting the longlist, shortlist and winner of the 2026 prize.

== Awards ==
Year	Work	Award	Category	Result	Ref.
2019	—	London Writers Award	—	Won	
2021	Assembly	Books Are My Bag Readers' Award	Fiction	Shortlisted	
2021	Assembly	Foyles Books of the Year	Fiction	Won	
2021	Assembly	Goldsmiths Prize	—	Shortlisted	
2021	Assembly	Los Angeles Times Book Prize	First Fiction	Shortlisted	
2022	Assembly	Betty Trask Prize and Awards	Betty Trask Award	Won	
2022	Assembly	British Book Award	Début Book of the Year	Shortlisted	
2022	Assembly	Desmond Elliott Prize	—	Longlisted	
2022	Assembly	Orwell Prize	Political Fiction	Shortlisted	
2022	Assembly	The Writers' Prize	—	Shortlisted	
2025	Universality	Booker Prize	—	Longlisted	
2025	Universality	Orwell Prize	Political Fiction	Shortlisted	
2025	Universality	Waterstones Book of the Year		Shortlisted	

== Selected publications ==
- —— (2021). Assembly (hardcover 1st ed.). London: Hamish Hamilton. ISBN 9780241515709.
- —— (2025). Universality (hardcover 1st ed.). London: Faber & Faber. ISBN 9780571389018.
