= Michael Byers (American academic) =

American writer

- Occupation: Novelist

Academic background
- Education: Oberlin College; University of Michigan

Michael Byers is an American writer based in Ann Arbor, Michigan. He is a graduate of Oberlin College and of the University of Michigan Creative Writing MFA Program. His first book, The Coast of Good Intentions, is a collection of short stories set in his native Pacific Northwest. His second book (and first novel), Long for this World, is set in his hometown of Seattle, Washington, and tells the story of a geneticist facing an ethical dilemma that might lead to a cure for a fatal childhood disease. His third book, Percival's Planet, a novel about the discovery of Pluto in 1930, was published in August 2010. His short story "Sibling Rivalry" was included in The Best American Short Stories 2020.

Byers is an assistant professor in the English Department at the University of Michigan in Ann Arbor. He is married to the poet Susan Hutton.

== Novels ==
- Long for this World (Houghton Mifflin 2003)
- Percival's Planet (Henry Holt 2010; published first in the UK as The Unfixed Stars)

== Short story collections ==
- The Coast of Good Intentions (Houghton Mifflin 1998)

== Honors and awards ==
- Friends of American Writers Literary Award for Long for this World
- American Academy of Arts and Letters Sue Kaufman Prize for First Fiction for The Coast of Good Intentions
- Whiting Award, 1998
- New York Times Notable Books, 1998 for The Coast of Good Intentions
- PEN/Hemingway Award (finalist) for The Coast of Good Intentions
- Stanford University Stegner Fellowship in Fiction, 1996–98
