= Jonn Elledge =

British journalist and author

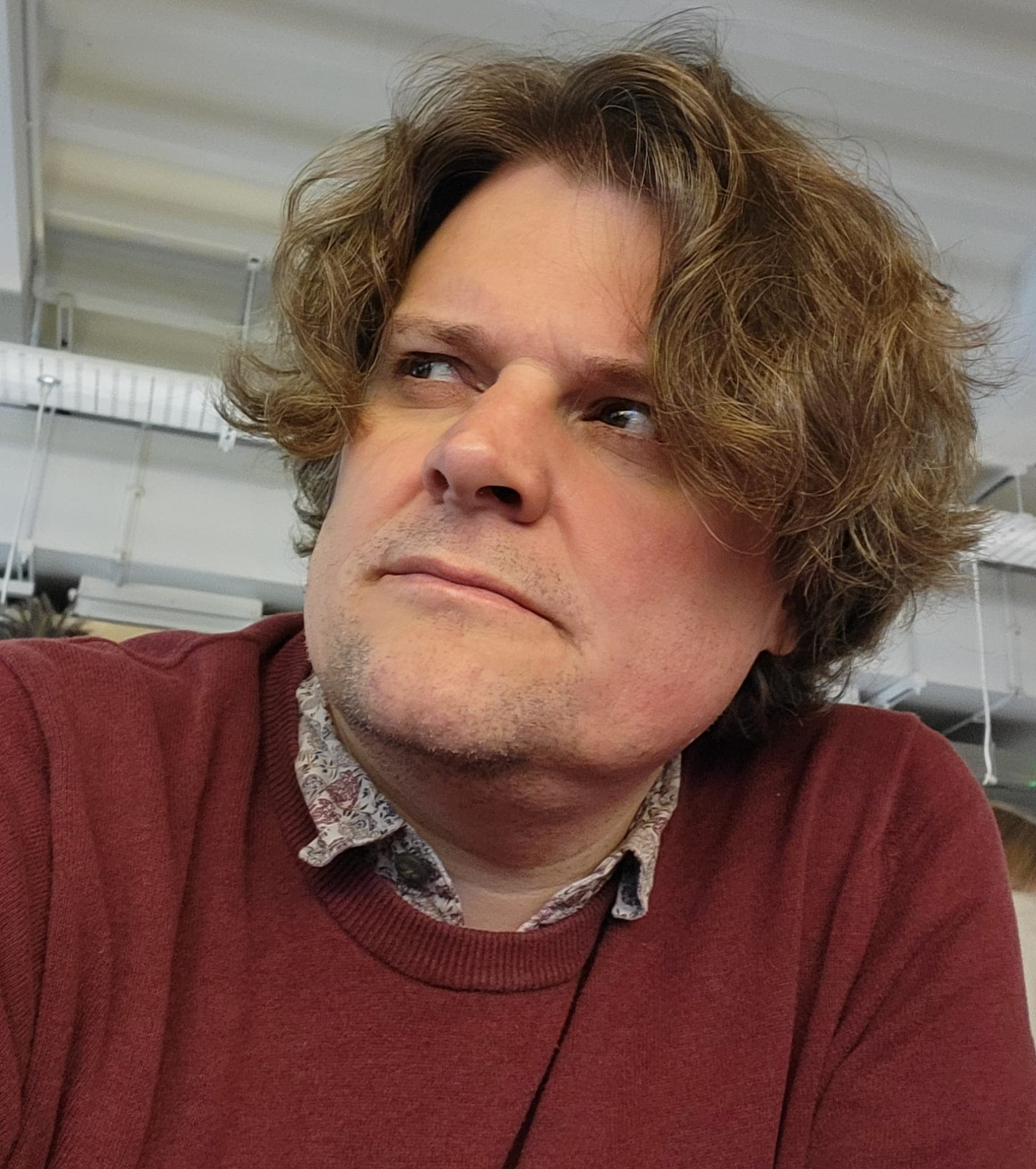
- Elledge 2025
- Born: 17 October 1980 (age 45)
- Education: Brentwood School, Essex; Trinity Hall, Cambridge; London College of Communication
- Occupations: Journalist, author
- Website: jonnelledge.wordpress.com

Jonn Elledge (born 17 October 1980) is an English journalist and non-fiction author.

== Education ==
His secondary schooling was at the independent Brentwood School, Essex. He received a BA (Hons) in English from Trinity Hall, Cambridge, receiving a 2.1, writing dissertations on 1930s political literature and the plays of Joe Orton. He also studied an MA in Journalism from the London College of Communication, receiving a distinction. While at university, he auditioned for the role of "Young Hagrid" in Harry Potter and the Chamber of Secrets.

== Career ==
=== Journalist and broadcaster ===
Elledge has worked as a columnist and as the assistant editor of New Statesman. Since going freelance, he has written for publications such as The Financial Times, The Guardian, and the i.

His television and radio appearances include The Today Programme on BBC Radio 4 and Free Thinking on BBC Radio 3. He has been a guest on topical and political podcasts such as Trash Talk… with Count Binface, Oh God, What Now?, and Paper Cuts.

=== Author ===
His book The Compendium of (Not Quite) Everything: All the Facts You Didn't Know You Wanted to Know was published in 2021 by Hachette UK.

In 2022, he co-wrote Conspiracy: A History of Boll*cks Theories, and How Not to Fall for Them with Tom Phillips.

His 2024 book A History of the World in 47 Borders: The Stories Behind the Lines on Our Maps was published by Hachette UK. It was the only non-fiction book nominated for Foyles Book of the Year in 2024.
