= Assembly (novel) =

2021 novel by Natasha Brown

- Author: Natasha Brown
- Audio read by: Pippa Bennett-Warner
- Language: English
- Genre: Literary fiction
- Publisher: Hamish Hamilton (UK); Little, Brown (US)
- Publication date: 3 June 2021 (UK); 14 September 2021 (US)
- Publication place: United Kingdom
- Media type: Print, ebook, audiobook
- Pages: 105 pp
- Awards: Foyles BotY—Fiction (2021); Betty Trask Award (2022)
- ISBN: 9780241515709 (1st edn)
- OCLC: 1201685227
- Dewey Decimal: 823/.92
- LC Class: PR6102.R69195 A92 2021

Assembly is the debut novel of British writer Natasha Brown, published in 2021. Critics praised Natasha Brown's precision, thematic depth, and brevity, with her style being compared to that of Virginia Woolf.

== Plot ==
Assembly follows the internal reflections of a young, successful Black British woman as she prepares to attend a lavish garden party hosted by her white boyfriend's family. As she navigates the pressures of her professional life in a predominantly white corporate environment and reflects on societal expectations tied to race, class, and gender, she confronts existential questions about her identity and future. Her musings intensify as she grapples with a recent medical diagnosis, forcing her to reconsider what it means to "succeed" in a society built on systemic inequalities.

== Release ==
Brown developed Assembly after receiving a 2019 London Writers Award in the literary fiction category. The book was published in hardcover format in the UK by Hamish Hamilton on 3 June 2021; Penguin also released an ebook and an audiobook read by Pippa Bennett-Warner. Assembly was subsequently released in the US by Little, Brown and Company on 14 September 2021, along with an ebook.

== Response ==
Assembly received starred reviews from Kirkus Reviews and Library Journal, as well as Shelf Awareness. According to Kirkus, the novel "has all the jagged clarity of a shard of broken glass. A piercing meditation on identity and race in contemporary Britain." Writing in the Times Literary Supplement, Desirée Baptiste remarks on "how a novel so slight can bear such weight", pointing out that it "blows apart the flimsily constructed notion of a race-blind meritocracy long severed from the umbilical cord of its imperial past."

The novel's economy of language is frequently mentioned as one of its strengths, with Brown's tight prose being described as "precise" and "crisp". Reviewers have pointed out that this minimalism gives the novel a sharpness that matches its thematic depth, allowing it to explore weighty topics without feeling overly didactic. The review in Publishers Weekly concluded: "This is a stunning achievement of compressed narrative and fearless articulation." According to The Masters Review: "Race, class and gender are encapsulated in a beautiful way in Assembly."

The author's writing style garnered admiration from some reviewers for its fragmented, stream-of-consciousness narrative, with critics noting how this disjointed structure mirrors the protagonist's internal conflict, her emotional exhaustion, and the disorientation she feels as she navigates both her personal and professional life. This technique has been likened to the introspective prose of Virginia Woolf, with several reviewers comparing Assembly to Woolf's Mrs Dalloway for its focus on the inner workings of a character's mind. The stream-of-consciousness style is seen as a bold yet effective choice, immersing readers into the protagonist's thoughts and making them feel the weight of her struggles.

Another point of discussion is the novel's exploration of existential themes, particularly the protagonist's awareness of her own mortality. As she reflects on her health and the pressures of conforming to societal expectations, the novel raises questions about personal agency, the value of success, and what it means to truly live. Critics have described Assembly as a meditation on life's fleetingness and the limits imposed by systemic oppression.

Literary Hub's Emily Temple compiled a comprehensive assessment of critic attitudes towards literature from 2021 calling it an "Ultimate Best Books of 2021 List"; she determined that altogether four mainstream magazines and outlets explicitly named the novel as a critical or important work on their own platforms' end-of-the-year lists. These consisted of The Guardian's Top Fiction of 2021, Publishers Weekly's Top 10 Books of 2021, The Washington Post's 50 Notable Works of Fiction of 2021 and The Philadelphia Inquirer's Best Books of 2021. It also made an appearance on The Atlantic magazine's 20 Best Books of 2021.

== Literary awards ==
Assembly was shortlisted for the Books Are My Bag Readers' Award, Goldsmiths Prize, Art Seidenbaum Award for First Fiction, British Book Award for Debut Book, Orwell Prize for Political Fiction, and The Writers' Prize; Assembly also won a Betty Trask Award.

Year	Award	Category	Result	Ref
2021	Books Are My Bag Readers' Award	Fiction	Shortlisted	
2021	Foyles Books of the Year	Fiction	Won	
2021	Goldsmiths Prize	—	Shortlisted	
2021	Los Angeles Times Book Prize	Art Seidenbaum Award for First Fiction	Shortlisted	
2022	Betty Trask Prize and Awards	Betty Trask Award	Won	
2022	British Book Award	Début Book of the Year	Shortlisted	
2022	Desmond Elliott Prize	—	Longlisted	
2022	Orwell Prize	Political Fiction	Shortlisted	
2022	The Writers' Prize	—	Shortlisted	
