= John Murray (Australian writer) =

Australian epidemiologist and writer (born 1963)

John Murray (born 1963) is an Australian epidemiologist and writer.

== Life ==
Murray was born in 1963 in Adelaide, Australia. In 1985, Murray received his medical degree. He received a master's of public health from Johns Hopkins University. He went on to the Centers for Disease Control's Epidemic Intelligence Service. He investigated the outbreak of diseases such as cholera and dysentery.

In fall 1999, he moved with his wife and daughter to Iowa, where he graduated from the Iowa Writers' Workshop.

In 2003, he published a collection of short stories.

== Works ==
- John Murray (4 March 2003). A Few Short Notes on Tropical Butterflies. HarperCollins. ISBN 0-06-050928-7. "A Few Short Notes on Tropical Butterflies (short Stories)."
