= Katya Apekina =

American novelist and short story writer

Katya Apekina is a Russian-American novelist and translator.

== Life ==
Apekina was born in Moscow into a family of refuseniks. They moved to the United States when Apekina was three. She grew up in Greater Boston. She attended Columbia University and Washington University in St Louis for her Master of Fine Arts. She now teaches at Antioch University Los Angeles. She has a daughter.

=== Work ===
Apekina's debut novel The Deeper The Water The Uglier The Fish was published by Two Dollar Radio in 2018. It was a finalist for the 2018 Los Angeles Times Book Prize and the First Novelist Award, and shortlisted for the William Saroyan International Prize for Writing. Her sophomore novel, Mother Doll, was published in 2024.

She has published short fiction in Alaska Quarterly Review, The Iowa Review, and Joyland. Her work is influenced by the work of Nadezhda Teffi and Marina Tsvetaeva.

She has translated poetry and prose for a Farrar, Straus and Giroux compendium of Vladimir Mayakovsky's work. She also writes nonfiction for Electric Literature.
