= Carolyn Ferrell =

American short story writer (born 1962)

- Born: 1962 (age 62–63); New York City, U.S.
- Occupation: Short story writer; novelist
- Education: Sarah Lawrence College; City College of New York (MA)
- Notable awards: John C. Zacharis First Book Award (1997); Art Seidenbaum Award for First Fiction (1997)
- Spouse: Linwood Lewis

Carolyn Ferrell (born 1962, Brooklyn, New York) is an American short story writer and novelist.

== Life ==
Ferrell graduated from Sarah Lawrence College, and City College of New York with an MA. She has lived, worked, and studied in West Berlin, Manhattan, and the South Bronx. She is married to and has children with psychology professor Linwood Lewis.

Her work has appeared in The Literary Review, Callaloo, Fiction, and Sojourner: The Women's Forum.

She teaches writing at Sarah Lawrence College.

== Awards ==
Year	Title	Award	Category	Result	Ref
1994	Proper Library	The Best American Short Stories	—	In	
1997	Don't Erase Me: Stories	John C. Zacharis First Book Award	—	Won	
1997	Don't Erase Me: Stories	Los Angeles Times Book Prize	Art Seidenbaum Award for First Fiction	Won	
1997	Don't Erase Me: Stories	Quality Paperback Book Prize	—	Won	
2020	Something Street	The Best American Short Stories			
2022	Dear Miss Metropolitan	PEN/Faulkner Award for Fiction	—	Shortlisted	
2022	Dear Miss Metropolitan	PEN/Hemingway Award for Debut Novel	—	Shortlisted	

== Works ==
- —— (1997). Don't Erase Me: Stories. Houghton Mifflin. ISBN 9780395713273.
- —— (2021). Dear Miss Metropolitan. Holt. ISBN 9781250793614.

=== Anthologies ===
- Susan Richards Shreve, ed. (2003). "A Child's Garden of Verse". Dream Me Home Safely: Writers on Growing Up in America. Houghton Mifflin Harcourt. p. 39. ISBN 978-0-618-37902-6.
- John Updike; Katrina Kenison, eds. (2000). "Proper Library". The best American short stories of the century. Houghton Mifflin Harcourt. ISBN 978-0-395-84367-3.
- Elizabeth Merrick, ed. (2006). This is not chick lit: original stories by America's best women writers. Random House, Inc. ISBN 978-0-8129-7567-3.
- Meri Nana-Ama Danquah, ed. (2003). "Wonderful Teen". Shaking the tree: a collection of new fiction and memoir by Black women. W. W. Norton & Company. ISBN 978-0-393-05067-7.

=== Ploughshares ===
- "Proper Library", Ploughshares, Spring 1993
- "Tiger Frame Glasses", Ploughshares, Spring 1997
