= Kwan Kew Lai =

Malaysian-American doctor

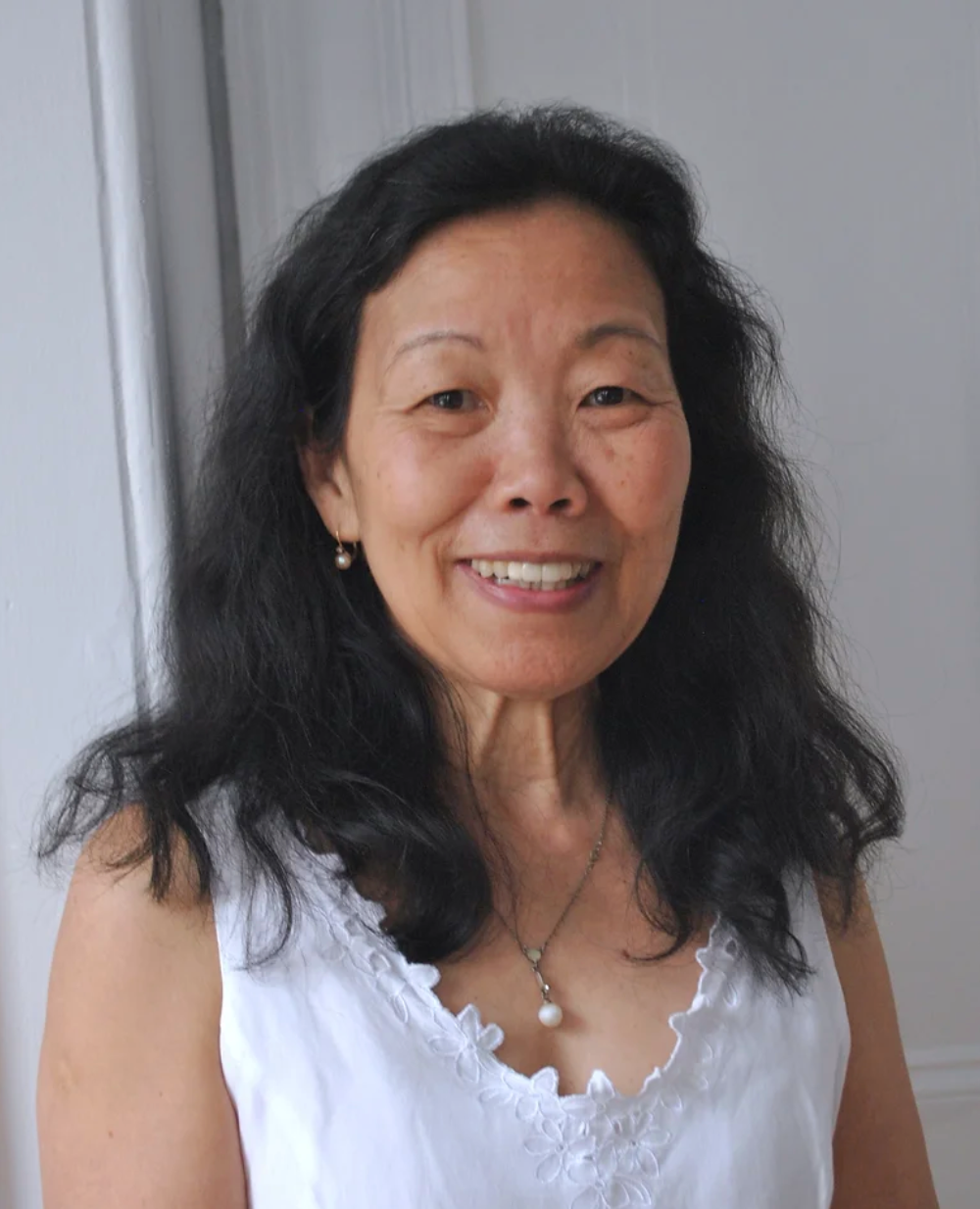
- Education: Chicago Medical School (MD)
- Alma mater: Wellesley College (1974)
- Occupation: Infectious Disease Specialist

Kwan Kew Lai is an American doctor.

== Early life ==
Kwan Kew Lai is originally from Penang, Malaysia. Through the library in the United States Information Service office, she learned about universities and colleges in the United States.

== Career ==
Once Lai completed her medical degree and residency in internal medicine, in 2001, she became a professor at the University of Massachusetts Medical School in Worcester. In 2005, she began her humanitarian work. In 2014, Lai volunteered at an Ebola Treatment Unit in Liberia. She donned a full protective body suit to care for her patients for 12-hour shifts. She had an Ebola Blog while working in Liberia, gaining NPR's attention. The article covered the eye-opening experience of Ebola treatment centers. She was invited to the White House by former President Barack Obama in recognition for work in Liberia during the Ebola outbreak.

Lai is now a Harvard Medical faculty physician affiliated with Beth Israel Deaconess. She is also a fellow of IDSA.

Lai is also a published author. She wrote, The Girl who Taught Herself to Fly and 2 more books.

== Education ==
In 1970 Lai received a full ride scholarship to Wellesley College where she earned her bachelor's degree in molecular biology. She did not receive her degree until finishing one year at Harvard University, because she enrolled there during her junior year 4 credits shy of her B.A. She continued with her studies at Harvard School of Dental Medicine. However, realizing she yearned for more, she continued on Chicago Medical School where her residency was in internal medicine and has been in practice for more than 20 years. Returning to Boston, she joined the University of Massachusetts Medical School faculty where she became a professor.
