= James Frankie Thomas =

American writer (born 1987)

- Born: New York
- Education: City College of New York (BA in English); Iowa Writers' Workshop (MFA)
- Occupation: Writer
- Writing career
- Genres: Bildungsroman, Campus novel
- Notable work: Idlewild

James Frankie Thomas is an American writer, best known for his debut novel, Idlewild. He was previously a columnist for The Paris Review and is currently a theatre critic at Vulture.

== Early life and education ==
Thomas is from New York. He earned a Bachelor of Arts in English from the City College of New York and a Master of Fine Arts in fiction from the Iowa Writers’ Workshop. He is transgender.

== Career ==
Thomas is a lecturer for the Master of Arts writing program at Johns Hopkins University. He previously worked as a columnist for The Paris Review. He was a theatre critic at Vulture.

=== Idlewild (2023) ===
Thomas' debut novel, Idlewild, was published by Abrams Books in 2023. The story revolves around an intense queer friendship between Fay and Nell that collapses when they meet two queer boys at a production of Othello. It is set in two timelines: between 2001 and 2002, when the two meet at a private Quaker high school in Manhattan called Idlewild, and in 2018 as they look back on their teenage years. Thomas described the book as "a direct descendant of Curtis Sittenfeld’s Prep and Alan Bennett’s The History Boys."

Kirkus Reviews wrote that "the novel bursts with voice, skillfully conjuring both the easy banter of best friends on AIM and the ruminating uncertainty of adolescence." The Millions called it "a compulsively readable, sincerely funny, nostalgic ode to adolescence," adding that "throughout the novel, Thomas captures the obsession innate to being a teenager with skillful sincerity and paints a uniquely beautiful portrait of a young trans man." Nylon wrote that Thomas's "puppeteer-like control of pacing guides us cinematically through scenes of euphoria, yearning, confusion, regret, grief, and hope." Friends Journal praised how "its prose flows from the witty to the sublime, the characters are superbly developed, and chapters are increasingly fast-paced, breaking into a sprint by the book’s conclusion."

Lambda Literary Review published a favourable review:

The stakes in this novel are relatively low–will a rich girl get into college, will the best friends get the lead in the school musical, will two boys kiss? Yet, over the course of almost four hundred pages that move at a quick, insatiable clip, they feel unbearably high. The careful attention paid to the inner workings of both girls, immediately relatable to anyone who shared a love of slash fiction and an early 2000s burgeoning political consciousness, imbue every chapter with emotional immediacy. The unreliable narrators–everyone in the book, made clear through cracks and slippages where Fay and Nell remember events differently, while each believing fully in their recollections–leave you wondering what really happened, and whether it matters.

Idlewild was a finalist for the 2023 Los Angeles Times Book Prize's Art Seidenbaum Award for First Fiction.

== Bibliography ==
=== Novel ===
- Idlewild. Abram Books. 2023. ISBN 978-1419769146.
