= Jennifer Gilmore =

American writer

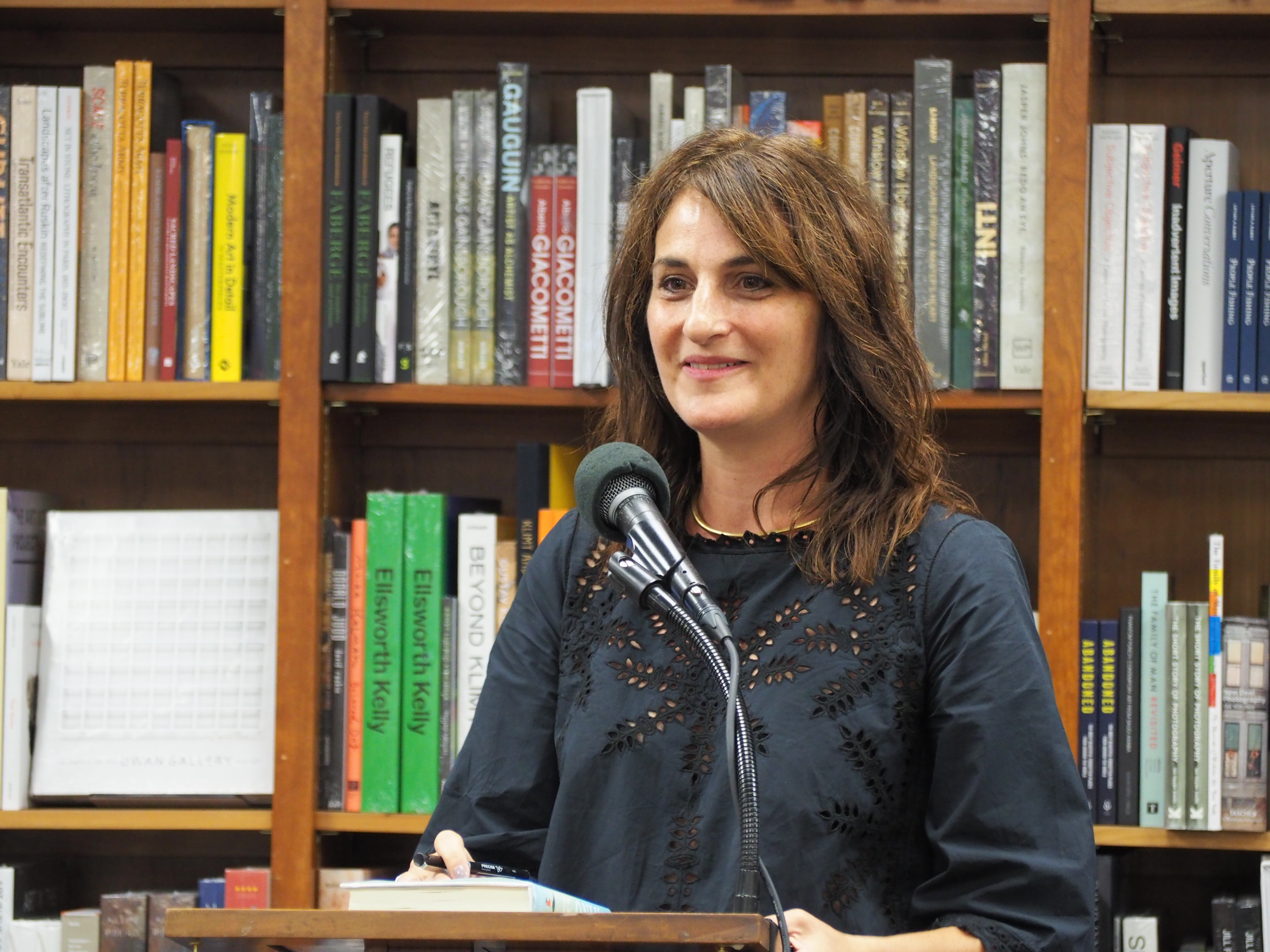
- Born: Geneva, Switzerland
- Education: Brandeis University, Cornell University
- Occupation: Writer
- Writing career
- Genre: novel

Jennifer Gilmore is a Swiss-born American novelist.

== Early life ==
Gilmore was born in Geneva, Switzerland.

== Education ==
Gilmore received her Bachelor of Arts from Brandeis University in 1992 and her Master of Fine Arts in fiction from Cornell University in 1997.

== Career ==
Gilmore's first novel, Golden Country, was published by Scribner in 2006 and was a New York Times notable book, a finalist for the Los Angeles Times Book Prize, and a finalist for the National Jewish Book Award.

Her second novel, Something Red, was published by Scribner in March 2010 and received glowing reviews from the Los Angeles Times, the Washington Post, O, the Oprah magazine, The New Yorker, Vanity Fair, and more. Mariner Books, an imprint of Houghton Mifflin Harcourt, published the paperback in March 2011.

Gilmore's work has appeared in many anthologies and magazines including The New York Times Magazine, The New York Times Book Review, the Los Angeles Times, Bookforum, Nerve and Salon.

== Personal ==
Gilmore lives in Easton, Pennsylvania with her husband, the painter, Pedro Barbeito.

== Works ==
- Golden Country, Orlando: Harcourt, 2007. ISBN 9780156034371, OCLC 85783455
- Something Red, Boston: Mariner Books, 2010. ISBN 9780547549422, OCLC 647772175
- Mothers., Scribner, 2014. ISBN 9781451697865, OCLC 862348113
- If Only, New York, NY: HarperTeen, 2018. ISBN 9780062393630, OCLC 1008983957

== Additional sources ==
- Gilmore, Jennifer; Jewish Family Christmas, The New York Times, 2006-12-24, retrieved 2008-04-21
- Gilmore, Jennifer; Golden Country: A Novel, Simon & Schuster, retrieved 2008-04-21
- Gilmore, Jennifer; Small, Good Bits, blog, 2006-08-29, retrieved 2008-04-21
- Video, retrieved 2008-04-21
