= Lisa Halliday =

American author

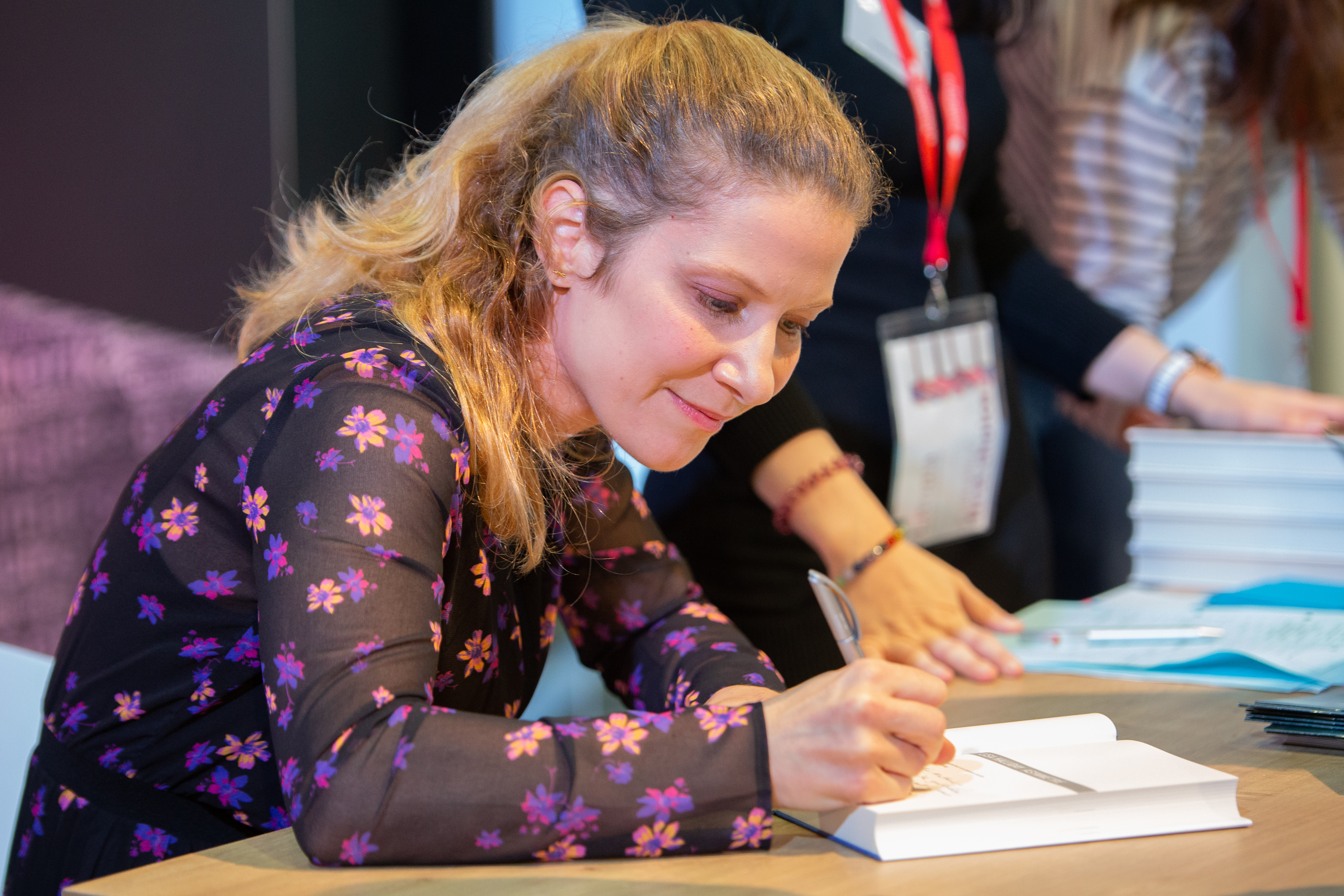
- Lisa at the Frankfurt Book Fair (2018)
- Born: July 12, 1976 (age 50); Medfield, Massachusetts, U.S.
- Education: Harvard University
- Occupation: Author
- Years active: 1997-present
- Notable work: Asymmetry
- Spouse: Theo (m. 2009)
- Children: 1
- Awards: Whiting Award

Lisa Halliday (born July 12, 1976) is an American author and novelist. She is most known for her novel Asymmetry, for which she received a Whiting Award in 2017.

== Life ==
Halliday was born and grew up in Medfield, Massachusetts, in a working-class family. Her ancestors come from Campania, Italy. Her father was a mechanic and a repairman, and her mother worked as a seamstress. In 1981, when she was 5 years old, her parents divorced. She and her sister moved in with her mother and her then-boyfriend, who started an extermination business together, later married. Halliday excelled in school and got into study at Harvard, making herself the first person in her immediate family to go to college. While studying art history at Harvard, she lived in Cambridge and Somerville in Massachusetts. After graduation in 1998, she moved to Manhattan and got a job as an assistant literary agent at The Wylie Agency, and later was promoted. She lived there for over a decade. She met Philip Roth at the agency and entered a relationship with him. In 2006, she left the agency and started focusing on her fiction. She did some freelance editing and ghostwriting to support herself financially. In 2009, she married British editor and translator, Theo, with whom she had worked in the same literary agency. In 2011, she moved to Milan with her husband, and in 2017 they had a daughter.

== Career ==
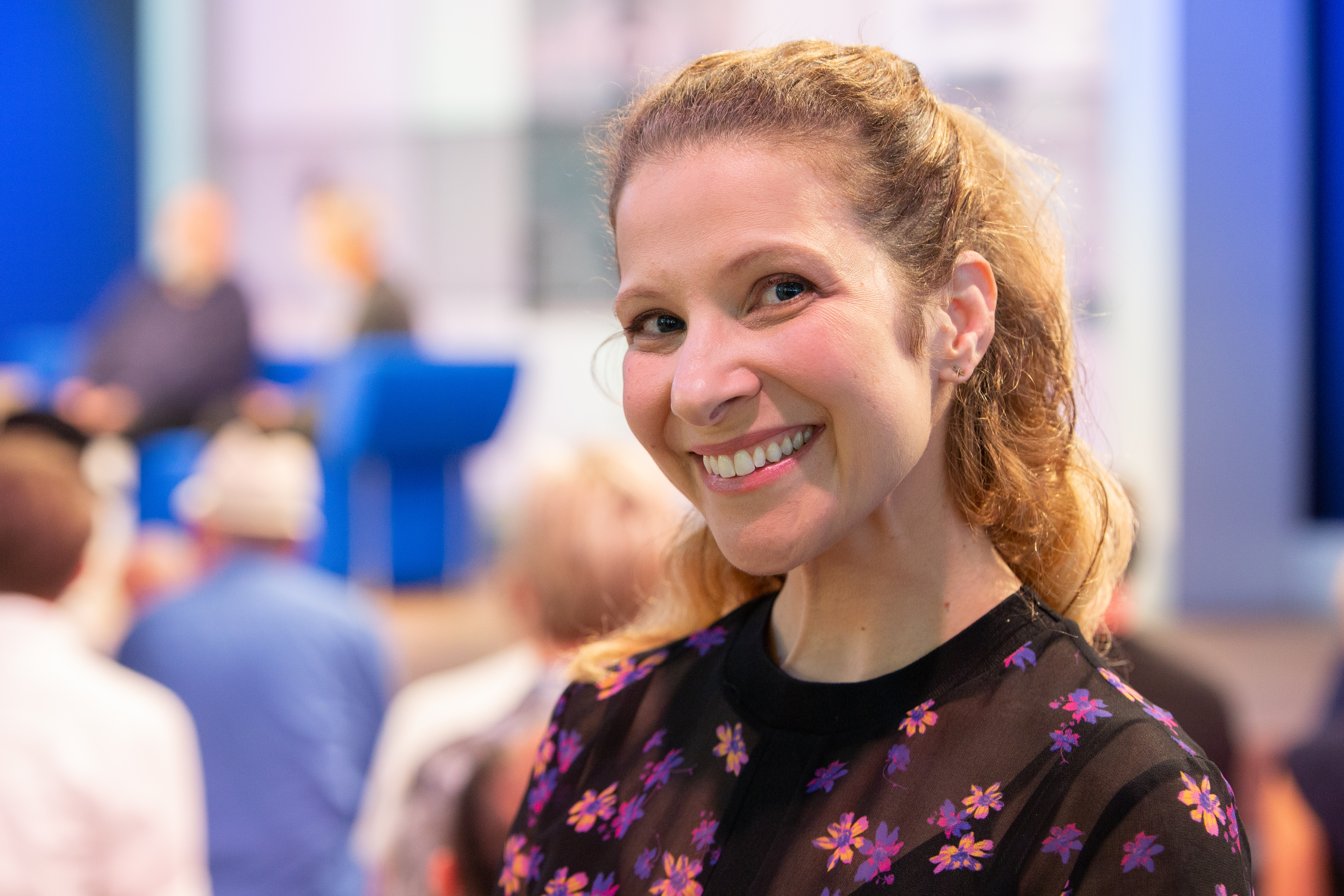
Halliday in 2018

Halliday started writing amateur short stories and books in the mid-1990s. In 1997, while studying at Harvard, she wrote The Unofficial Guide to Life at Harvard 1997-1998. In 2005, her short story Stump Louie appeared in the Paris Review. Halliday published her debut novel, Asymmetry, in 2018, for which she received a Whiting Award in the fiction category. The book was published by Simon & Schuster in February 2018. The book was named as one of the top ten books of 2018 by The New York Times, The New Yorker, Time, and several other publications. Barack Obama included the book in his list of best books from 2018.
