= Maria Kuznetsova (novelist) =

American novelist

- Марія Кузнєцова
- Born: Kyiv, Ukraine
- Occupation: Novelist

Maria Kuznetsova (Note: Ukrainian: Марія Кузнєцова, romanized: Mariia Kuznietsova) is a novelist with two book publications, both from Random House.

== Early life and education ==
Kuznetsova was born in Kyiv, Ukraine, and moved to the U.S. at five years old with her family. After the dissolution of the Soviet Union, her family became Jewish refugees in Alabama. Upon moving, she learned English, and eventually attended Duke University as an English major. She went on to receive master's degrees in creative writing from University of California, Davis and the Iowa Writers' Workshop. She serves as an assistant professor in the English department at Auburn University.

== Writing ==
Kuznetsova's debut novel Oksana, Behave! was published in 2019 by Random House. A bildungsroman about a young Ukrainian immigrant woman divided into "episodes" for chapters, the book was reviewed positively by Emma Straub in the Wall Street Journal, Anya Ulinich in the New York Times, O, The Oprah Magazine, Kirkus Reviews, and Publishers Weekly. Kuznetsova wrote in an essay for Catapult that many readers assumed that the book was autobiographical. The book's launch also led to author interviews with a variety of publications including Electric Literature, Bookforum, The Gazette, and the Chicago Review of Books. Kuznetsova stated that the Soviet dissident Sergei Dovlatov was an influence on the work.

Following the success of her first novel, Kuznetsova published her second, Something Unbelievable, less than two years later, in April 2021. The book centers a grandmother in Ukraine and a granddaughter in the U.S. discussing their Jewish family's history through and after the Holocaust. Rachel Khong wrote that the book argues that "the everyday matters—how unspectacular moments can transcend their confines, how miraculous the ordinary can be" in the New York Times. In an interview with Sanjena Santhian for The Millions, she said the novel began as a short story that she wrote for a class with Ethan Canin at the Iowa Writers' Workshop. This story's grandmother character was based on her grandmother in life, which she wrote about in an essay for Guernica. In an interview for Bookforum, she said that the second novel was different because it required more historical research than the first. It also received positive reviews from the Moscow Times, Bustle, Ploughshares, and the A.V. Club. However, it also received negative reviews, including one from Publishers Weekly, which wrote that the book "tediously unfolds" and "there’s not enough to hold readers' interest."

Kuznetsova has also published books reviews and other nonfiction, including essays in Slate about her experience having a miscarriage and postpartum depression after the birth of her daughter.
