= Ski Idlewild =

Ski park in Colorado

- Interactive map of Ski Idlewild
- Location: Colorado, United States
- Nearest city: Winter Park, Colorado
- Coordinates: 39°55′38″N 105°46′45″W
- Top elevation: 9,100 feet (2,774 m)
- Base elevation: 8,700 feet (2,652 m)
- Trails: 5 total 60% beginner 40% intermediate 0% advanced/expert
- Longest run: 0.5 miles (0.8 kilometres)
- Lift system: 2 total (1 fixed-grip chair, 1 surface lift)

Older Ski Idlewild logo used in the 60s and 70s

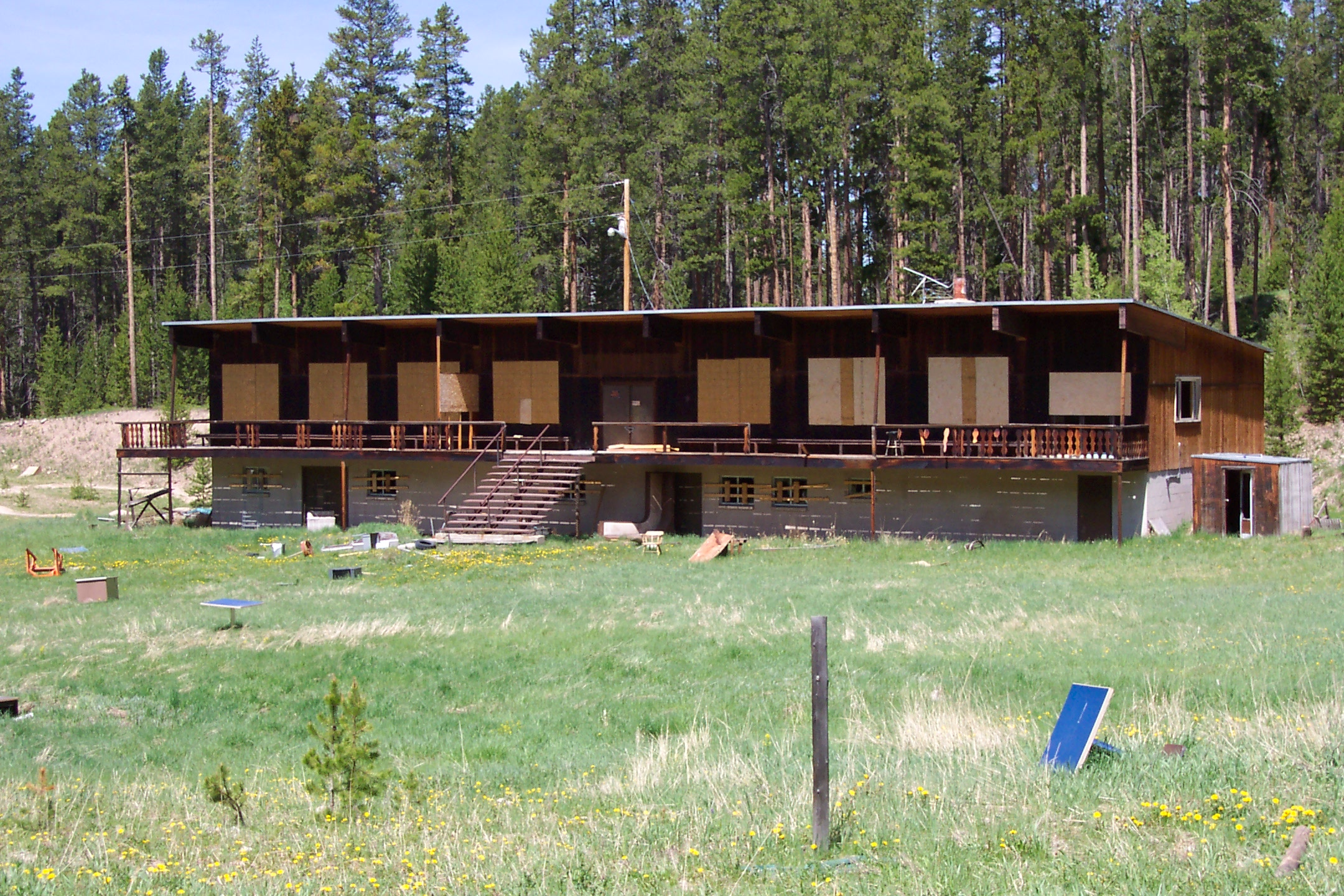
The Ski Idlewild base lodge

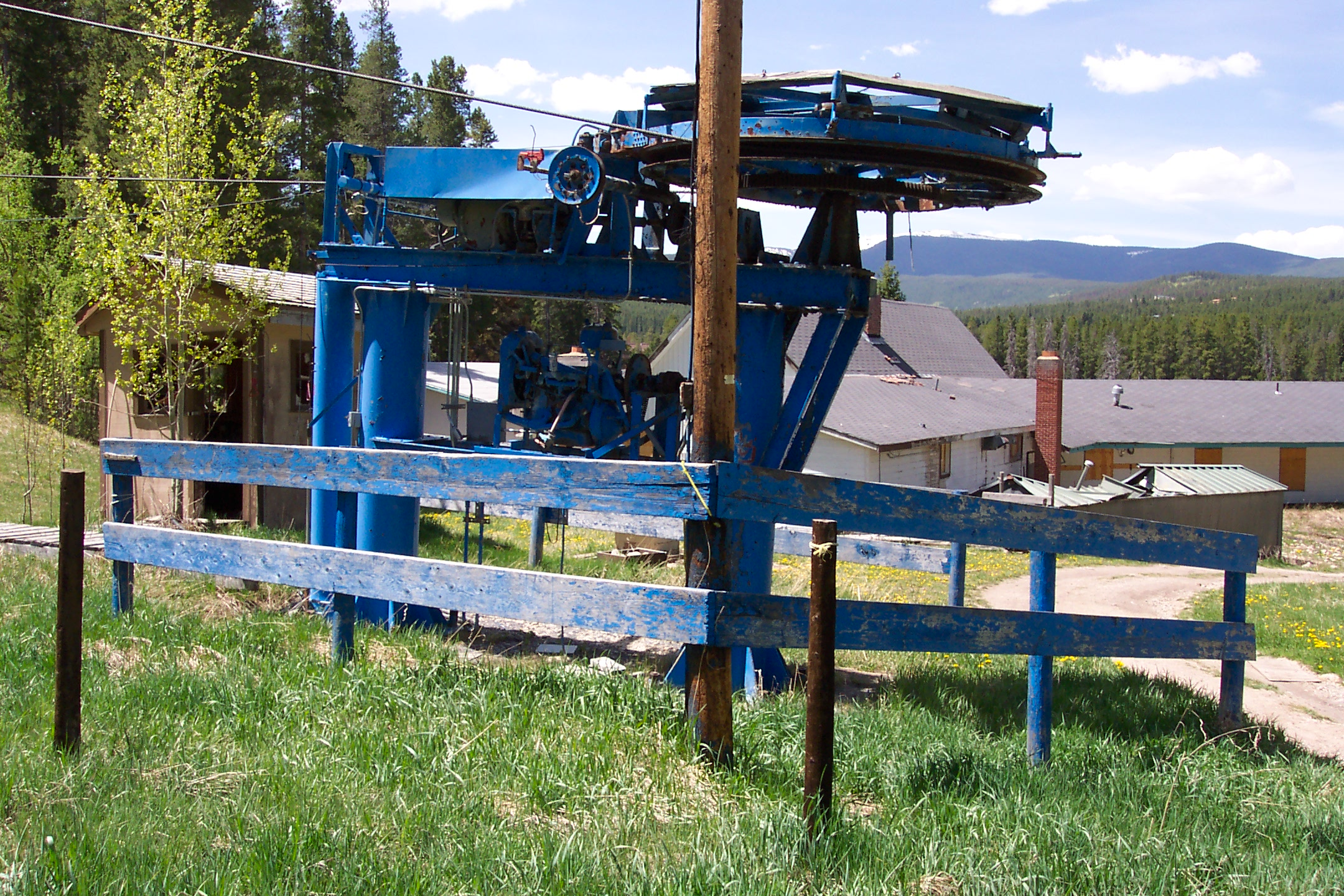
Lower terminal of the double chairlift

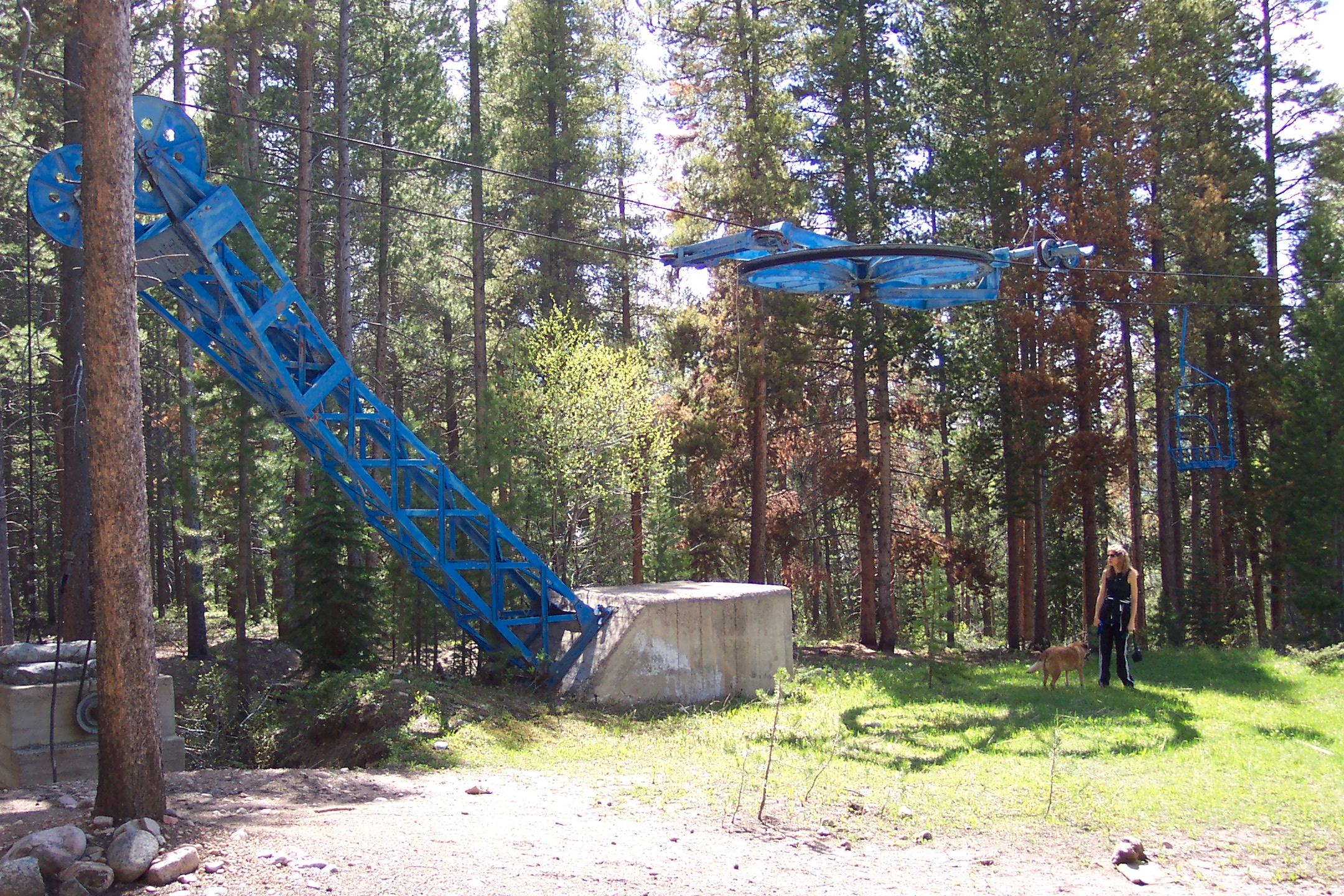
Upper terminal of the double chairlift (note the floating bullwheel)

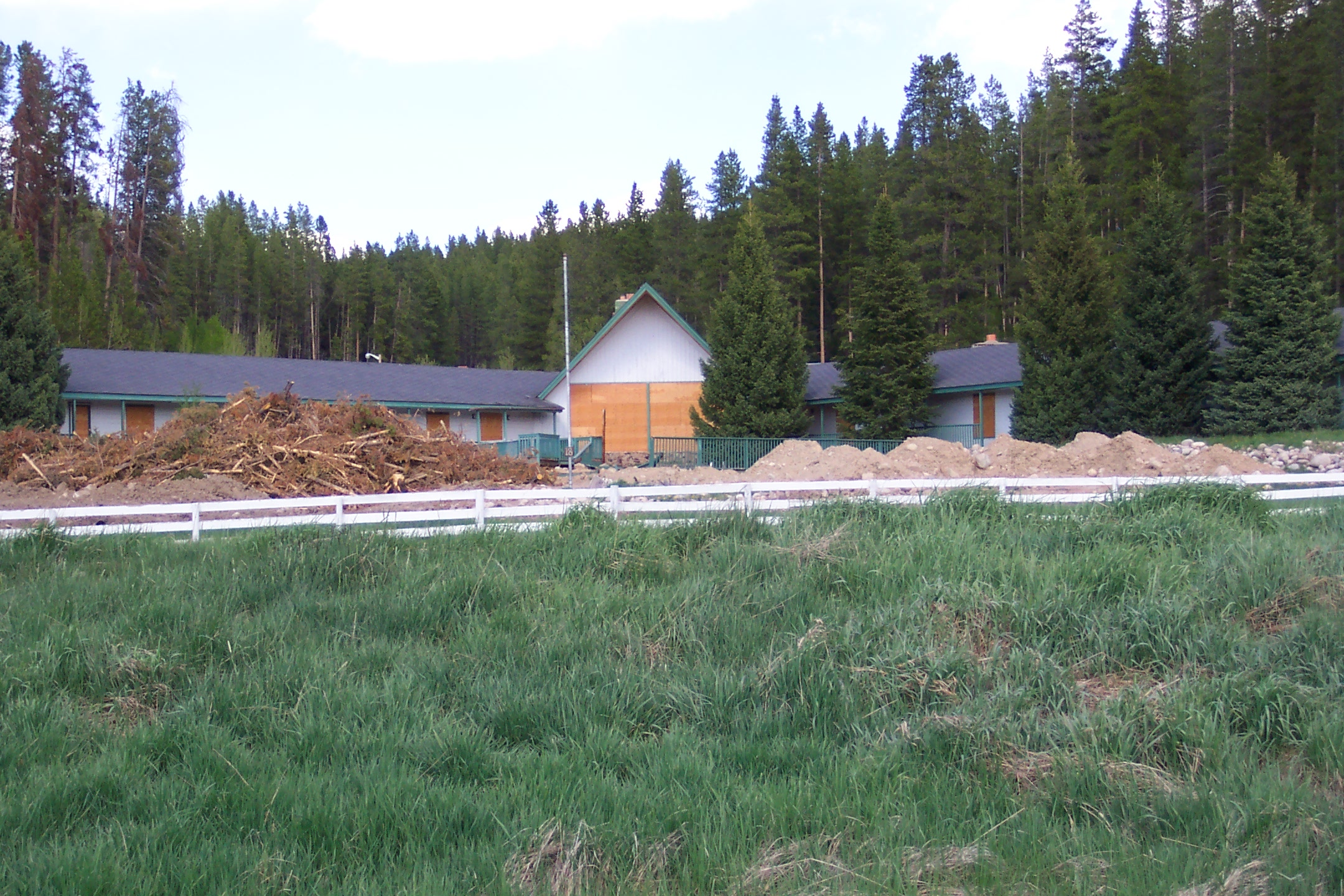
The Idlewild Lodge hotel

Ski Idlewild was a small ski area located in Hideaway Park, Colorado (now downtown Winter Park). It began operation in 1961 opened by Dwight and Jean Miller with a blue Pomagalski (now Poma of America) double chair with shield. In 1967 a platter lift was installed, yielding better access to the north ski runs and giving first-time skiers an easier way to access the slopes. At the base of Ski Idlewild was which was Idlewild Guest Ranch, a hotel built three years before the ski area opened. The Idlewild Lodge hotel, not to be confused with the Ski Idlewild base lodge, was a part of the Idlewild Guest Ranch and featured tennis courts, a swimming pool, a disc golf course, cross country ski trails, and the Idlewild Barn, an ice skating rink. After many years of providing novice skiers with fun and affordable skiing, Ski Idlewild closed on March 20, 1986.

In 1986, the left sheave train (wheel system) of the chairlift failed and fell to the ground. There were no deaths or injuries, but four people had to be evacuated from the lift by the ski patrol. Ski Idlewild could not pay the $550 inspection fee to the Colorado Passenger Tramway Safety Board, and the ski area was abandoned. The Idlewild Guest Ranch continued its operation as a cross-country ski area, and the Ski Idlewild base lodge was closed and used for document storage. Idlewild Lodge teamed up with Devil's Thumb Ranch in Tabernash, creating a vast network of cross country ski trails connecting Tabernash, Fraser, and Winter Park. In 1994, the Idlewild Lodge hotel was sold, renovated, and reopened for winter and summer operation until closing again in summer 1996. Up until the close of the hotel in 2002, the ski area was serviced by the Winter Park Resort shuttle, which provided free transportation to Ski Idlewild.

== Ski Idlewild Today ==
For six years, Ski Idlewild sat boarded up, though almost all lifts and buildings remained. It became a frequent target of vandals and looters, as well as an occasional hangout for local kids. On July 29, 2008, it was announced that the buildings would be burned to make way for a paved road into the adjacent Rendezvous housing development and a park which will be formed on land the current owner plans to donate to the city. The next day, however, it was noted that the burning has been delayed and that no date has yet been chosen for the rescheduled destruction.

== Idlewild prices over the years ==
(Some 1984 stats based on info from ColoradoSkiHistory.com)

1967-1968 Ski Season

- Lift Tickets
  - 1 Ride $1.00
  - Half Day $3.00
  - Full Day $4.00
  - 3 days $10.00
  - 1 Week $21.00
  - Under 18 $3.25
- Ski School also offered

1974-1975 Ski Season

- Ski School
  - 1 day $8.00
  - 3 days $21.00
  - 5 days $35.00
  - 1 half day $6.00
  - 3 half days $16.00
  - 5 half days $26.00
  - Private Lesson $6.00 per hour plus $6.00 per person
- Lift Tickets
  - All day $6.00
  - Half day $4.50
  - Under 12 $4.00
  - 3 day $17.00
  - 5 day $27.00
  - Over 65 half price

1976-1977 Ski Season

- Ski School
  - 1 day $9.00
  - 3 days $24.00
  - 5 days $35.00
  - 1 half day $7.00
  - 3 half days $19.00
  - 5 half days $31.00
  - Private Lesson $6.00 per hour plus $6.00 per person
- Lift Tickets
  - All day $6.50
  - Half day $5.00
  - Under 12 $4.00
  - 3 day $18.00
  - 5 day $29.00
  - Over 65 half price

1984-1985 Ski Season

- Ski School
  - 1 day $18.00
  - 2 days $32.00
  - 1 half day $12.00
  - Private Lesson $17.00 per hour plus $8.00 per person
- Lift Tickets
  - All day $11.00
  - Under 12 $8.00
  - Over 65 half price
