= My Absolute Darling =

2017 debut novel by Gabriel Tallent

- First edition (US)
- Author: Gabriel Tallent
- Cover artist: Meighan Cavanaugh
- Language: English
- Genre: Literary fiction
- Publisher: Riverhead Books (US); Fourth Estate (UK)
- Publication date: 2017
- Publication place: US
- Pages: 417
- ISBN: 9780735211179

My Absolute Darling is the 2017 debut novel by American author Gabriel Tallent, published in the US by Riverhead Books.

== Plot ==
Julia "Turtle" Alveston, age fourteen, lives in California with her sociopathic father, Martin. He is convinced of impending catastrophe, forcing her to learn survivalist skills. Turtle is thus highly proficient with firearms. The extent of Martin's physical and sexual abuse of Turtle is revealed as the plot progresses, though Turtle's Stockholm syndrome cause her to make excuses for his behavior. Although Turtle's teacher suspects the abuse, Martin threatens to kill Turtle if she tells anyone the truth. Turtle meets two teenage boys; they become her first real friends.

After Turtle's grandfather, her only other living family, dies, Martin disappears for several months, leaving Turtle to provide for herself. When he returns, he brings a young girl named Cayenne, age nine or ten, whom he took at a gas station. One night, Turtle rebuffs her father's attempted rape by cleaning and loading her gun as he enters her bedroom. The following night she hears him bring Cayenne back to his bedroom instead. Using her shotgun, she blows the lock off his bedroom door, attempting to stop the rape. In the ensuing struggle, Martin nearly strangles her, though she is able to fight him off and escape with Cayenne; she flees to her friend Jacob's house, frightened because her father has the address and might hurt him in retribution.

Martin arrives at Jacob's house. In an ensuing firefight where Turtle is shot three times, she manages to kill him, protecting her friends and Cayenne. She then lives with her former teacher, and uses gardening as a means to overcome her trauma.

== Reception ==
Michael Schaub of NPR called the book "difficult to read" in reference to its depictions of child abuse. However, he also stated "it's also nearly impossible to put down", praising its thrilling pace. Schaub also praised the character Turtle, saying she was both memorable and original. Lisa Zeidner of The Washington Post wrote that Turtle was impressively complex, particularly in how she simultaneously loved her father and was enraged by him. Parul Sehgal for The New York Times, however, criticized the character, saying "we're left with...an action hero, a kind of male fantasy figure out of Mad Max: Fury Road. And it’s a fantasy of a wearying sort, because Turtle has clearly been designed to be 'empowering.'"
