= Come to Me =

Come to Me may refer to:

== Albums ==
- Come to Me (Juice Newton album), 1977
- Come to Me, a 1994 re-release of France Joli's eponymous 1979 album

== Songs ==
- "Come to Me" (Diddy song), 2006
- "Come to Me" (Diesel song), 1991
- "Come to Me" (France Joli song), 1979
- "Come to Me" (Goo Goo Dolls song), 2013
- "Come to Me" (Johnny Mathis song), 1958
- "Come to Me" (Marv Johnson song), 1959
- "Come to Me" (Ricky Martin song), 2002
- "Come to Me" (Sarkodie song), 2017
- "Come to Me", by Otis Redding from The Great Otis Redding Sings Soul Ballads, 1964
- "Come to Me", by Björk from Debut, 1993
- "Come to Me", by Bobby Caldwell from Bobby Caldwell, 1978
- "Come to Me", by Celine Dion from Miracle, 2004
- "Come to Me", by Damien Leith from Night of My Life, 2006
- "Come to Me", by Jesse McCartney from Beautiful Soul, 2004
- "Come to Me", by Psapp from Wet Salt, 2009
- "Come to Me", by Tommy James and the Shondells, 1970
- "Come to Me", by Treasure, 2020
- "Come to Me", by Vangelis from Voices, 1995
- "Come to Me", from the film Indiscreet, 1931
