= Idlewild (Fredericksburg, Virginia) =

Historic house in Virginia, United States

- U.S. National Register of Historic Places
- Virginia Landmarks Register
- Location within Northern Virginia Location within Virginia Location within the United States
- Location: 1501 Gateway Blvd., Fredericksburg, Virginia
- Coordinates: 38°17′26″N 77°30′20″W
- Area: 6.6 acres (2.7 ha)
- Built: 1859
- Built by: Tongue, James
- Architectural style: Gothic Revival
- NRHP reference No.: 09000415
- VLR No.: 111-0151

Significant dates
- Added to NRHP: June 8, 2009
- Designated VLR: March 19, 2009

Idlewild, also known as the Downman House, was a historic home located at Fredericksburg, Virginia. It was built in 1859; a fire in April 2003 destroyed most of the interior and collapsed the roof. It was a 2 1/2-story, Gothic Revival-style brick dwelling with an English basement and an irregular "T" shape with a center passage plan. The house was topped by a steep slate gable roof. Also on the property at present are three contributing brick dependencies and a contributing pet cemetery. During the American Civil War, Idlewild became a prominent landmark on 4 May 1863, during battle action related to the Chancellorsville campaign. On that evening Confederate General Robert E. Lee used the house as his headquarters, after being initially occupied that day by Federal troops of the Union Sixth Corps.

It was listed on the National Register of Historic Places in 2009.

== History ==
Idlewild Mansion in Fredericksburg, Virginia is also called Downman House. It is an excellent example of the American Gothic Revival style popular in the mid-1800s. Idlewild was built in 1859 by William Yates Downman, a blue blooded Virginian whose family seat was Belle Isle in Lancaster County.

It is thought that perhaps the style and name of Mr. Downman's house was inspired by the well-known editor and writer Nathaniel Parker Willis. Willis built a large Gothic styled "cottage" overlooking a steep gorge in the Hudson River Valley in 1846. When he first viewed the property, the sellers told him it was nothing but "an idle wild of which nothing could ever be made". As a result, the new home was named "Idlewild". Many of Willis' writings made reference to his beloved home and in 1855 he published a popular book entitled "Outdoors At Idlewild". The book featured a drawing of a large Gothic styled mansion on its cover. William Downman may easily have been inspired to create his own Idlewild when he began building his new home for his growing family.

William and his wife Mary Ann Hayes Downman had three young children when they moved into their new home. Their oldest daughter Anne Hayes (Nannie) Downman would grow up and marry R. Innes Taylor of nearby Fall Hill. Sophia Chinn Downman would marry architect Marion Dimmock of Richmond. First born son Joseph Henry Downman (named after William's father) would die only a few days after his birth. John Yates Downman dedicated his life to the ministry and would be the last surviving member of the family and the last family owner of Idlewild. Rawleigh William Downman was the first son to be born at Idlewild but would pass away at the early age of twenty one while visiting relatives in Baltimore. James Hayes Downman would become a successful New York businessman who came back to Fredericksburg where he died while visiting sister Nannie at her home at Fall Hill. Mary Ann had the first Tiffany stained glass window in St. George's Church in Fredericksburg installed in memory of these two sons. In later years, Mary Ann, Nannie and Sophia moved back to their "city home" on Caroline Street in Fredericksburg. Mary Ann would be Fredericksburg's oldest resident when she died in the 1920s.

Idlewild served as Confederate Gen. Robert E. Lee’s headquarters on May 4–5, 1863, during the Civil War’s Chancellorsville campaign. With its location just west of Fredericksburg, the mansion and its grounds were often the site of skirmishes and occupations by troops of both sides. Mention is made of some of the incidents in the "practice" letters of daughter Sophia who jotted down her correspondence in her father's old notebooks - one volume of which recently found its way back to Fredericksburg. (This little book and its writings was the subject of an article written by local historian and Idlewild advocate Donna Chasen.)

== Damage by fire ==
Idlewild has been in ruins since it burned in April 2003 after vandals set it on fire. Idlewild again suffered damage from a smaller porch fire in August 2006. An earthquake on 23 August 2011 damaged the chimneys in the main house and leveled the two chimneys on the summer kitchen. The brick walls of the house have been braced with steel beams and remained basically unharmed by the quake. Considering, the house remains in stable condition. There are many theories to how the Downman House burned down the most likely being vandals. There are others such as homeless campers who set up a fire in the weakest fireplace.

== Official recognition ==
The property has been added to the Virginia Landmarks Register and was listed on the National Register of Historic Places in June 2009.

== Local surroundings ==
The mansion sits on a hill overlooking Hazel Run. Three period dependencies remain: a summer kitchen, a meathouse and a laundry. It is thought that brick walkways remain connecting the main house to these outbuildings but further archaeological research would be necessary to confirm this. The land directly surrounding the mansion remains intact with older milking sheds, corn cribs and other non-contributing structures in place. It is well shielded by trees from the surrounding development.

A large planned community, called The Village of Idlewild, has been built centered around the mansion in recent years. Starting March, 2023, a large amount of property surrounding the mansion has been razed in order to build a middle school.
