= Asymmetry (novel) =

2018 novel by Lisa Halliday

- First edition (US)
- Author: Lisa Halliday
- Language: English
- Genre: Literary Fiction
- Publisher: Simon & Schuster (US); Granta Books (UK)
- Publication date: 2018
- ISBN: 978-1501166761

Asymmetry is the first novel by American author Lisa Halliday, published in February 2018 by Simon & Schuster. The novel has received critical acclaim with The New Yorker calling it "a literary phenomenon" and The New York Times including it in the list of "15 remarkable books by women that are shaping the way we read and write fiction in the 21st century." Barack Obama included the book in his list of best books from 2018. The cover of the first edition locates the novel on Manhattan's Upper West Side by displaying the distinctive turret of 271 West End Avenue at 72nd Street.

== Plot ==
The book is composed of three parts that take place over different periods of time in the 2000s.

=== Part 1: Folly ===
The 25-year old Alice, who works for a publishing company, starts an affair with a famous writer, Ezra Blazer. They both live and work in New York City, and the story follows their affair over time, as many world events happen in the background, most noticeably the start of the Iraq War. Because Blazer is very famous, they spend most of their time inside his apartment often watching TV and discussing the 2003 and 2004 ALCS playoffs between Red Sox and Yankees.

=== Part 2: Madness ===
It's Christmas 2008 and Amar Jaafari, an American citizen of Iraqi-Kurdish descent is held for questioning at the Heathrow Airport in London on his way to Iraq. During the hours of his detention, he recalls his life in America, his visits to Iraq during the war, and his brother, a doctor who learned to play piano during his childhood in America, who has gone missing.

=== Part 3: Ezra Blazer's Desert Island Discs ===
More years have passed, and during a radio interview with the BBC in 2011, we learn that Ezra Blazer has finally won the Nobel Prize in literature. During the interview he mentions that a young friend of his has written a little novel, hinting that Amar's story is "Alice's creative jailbreak."

== Ezra Blazer as Philip Roth ==
Ezra Blazer employs many quotations and turns of phrase that appear in the novels and conversation of Philip Roth (1933–2018). Among them are

- Page 4. Roth's favorite joke ("You're velcome.")
- Pages 5, 271. The pickup line "Are you game?" appears in Everyman, pp. 132, 133.
- Page 71. The rule about Chekhov's gun going off in a later chapter is used in the "Judea" and "Aloft" chapters of The Counterlife.
- Page 252. The military policeman directing traffic so that it "flows through the hips" appears in the "Salad Days" chapter of My Life as a Man.
- Page 253. The attempt to write a novel about a Jewish soldier's postwar affair with a "blond German girl" appears in the "My True Story" section of My Life as a Man.
- Page 258. The ballet dancer with the "little monkey face" appears in the "Maestro" chapter of The Ghost Writer.

== Film adaptation ==
On May 1, 2026, it was announced that Richard Gere and Diana Silvers would star as Ezra and Alice, respectively, in a film adaptation of the novel. The film will be directed by Edward Zwick, who also co-wrote the script with Marshall Herskovitz and original author Halliday.
