= Real Americans =

2024 novel by Rachel Khong

- Author: Rachel Khong
- Genre: Literary fiction, science fiction, speculative fiction, Asian American fiction
- Publisher: Knopf
- Publication date: April 30, 2024
- Pages: 416
- ISBN: 9780593537251
- Preceded by: Goodbye, Vitamin

Real Americans is a 2024 novel by American writer Rachel Khong, published by Knopf. The novel follows a Chinese American family across three generations in both China and the United States. Khong began writing the novel in December 2016, shortly after the 2016 United States presidential election and before the release of her 2017 debut, Goodbye Vitamin.

== Synopsis ==
The novel is split into three sections, each one concerning a different generation of the Chinese American families centered in the novel. The first part takes place in New York City in 1999, following the character Lily Chen during her internship and subsequent romance with a rich man named Matthew Allen. The second section follows Nick in 2021, the child of Lily and Matthew, and his attempt to find his absent father through a DNA test. The third section introduces Lily's mother and Nick's grandmother, May, who works as a geneticist in 2030 after having escaped from the Cultural Revolution while growing up. Covering over eight decades, the novel includes and addresses historical events like the turbulence of Maoist China, the September 11 attacks, and the legal battle over affirmative action in the United States.

== Critical reception ==
Kirkus Reviews, in a starred review, found the novel "Bold, thoughtful, and delicate at once ... through artfully crafted scenes and characters." Publishers Weekly considered it "an impressive family drama."

Critics in the Los Angeles Times, Washington Post, Star Tribune, and NPR appreciated Khong's speculative, imaginative approach to questions of wealth inequality, genetic research, ethics of technology, Chinese American lineage. Interview admired Khong's genre-defying ambition: "Real Americans is a brilliant, sprawling, maximalist, multigenerational novel ... It's somehow historical fiction, a love story, a science fiction thriller, a fantasy novel, and a psychological drama all at once." Harper's Bazaar lauded the complexity of Khong's characters, conflicts, and storylines. In comparison to Khong's first novel which was "slim and focused on a single point of view", Alta Journal remarked that her second novel was "sprawling, employing three narrators and spanning decades."

Per the novel's namesake, many critics observed Khong's interrogation of American identity and American exceptionalism. Some critics in The Guardian and New York Times at times felt that Khong's commentary on America was too overbearing.

The novel was chosen for Jenna Bush Hager's Today Show book club for May 2024.
