= Meng Jin =

American novelist

- Born: 1989 (age 36–37)
- Education: Harvard University (BA); Hunter College (MFA)
- Occupation: Novelist

Meng Jin (born 1989) is an American novelist.

== Life ==
She graduated with a BA from Harvard University in 2011, and from Hunter College's MFA program in 2015. While at Hunter, she was a Hertog Fellow. Continuing to teach literature and creative writing at Hunter, Jin also guest lectures at Harvard. She is a Kundiman Fellow at Fordham University and a Steinbeck Fellow at San Jose State University; and has also received support from the Elizabeth George Foundation.

Her writing has appeared in Baltimore Review, Ploughshares, The Arkansas International, The Threepenny Review, Vogue, Bare Life Review, and The Masters Review; as well as anthologies such as The Best American Short Stories and Pushcart Prize: Best of the Small Presses.

She became the 2016-17 David T. K. Wong Fellow, a program at University of East Anglia, for her work in "deepening — through literature — inter-cultural understanding between Asia and the West".

== Works ==
=== Novels and Short Collections ===
- Little Gods: A Novel (2020)
- Self-Portrait With Ghost (2022)

=== Short stories and editorials ===
Date	Work	Magazine	Ref
January 2014	"Ratios and Differences"	Bound Off Short Story Podcast #96	
Summer 2014	"The Weeping Widow"	Baltimore Review	
Summer/Autumn 2015	"You Who Made It Happen"	ZYMBOL #5	
Winter 2015-16	"Ghost"	Ploughshares (Vol 41, No 4)	
Spring 2018	"She and She and I"	The Arkansas International	
Fall 2019	"In the Event"	The Threepenny Review (Fall 2019)	
Fall 2019	"In the Event"	The Best American Short Stories 2020 (2020)	
Fall 2019	"In the Event"	Pushcart Prize XLV: Best of the Small Press (2021)	
January 13, 2020	"Marilyn, My Mother and Me"	Vogue	
April 10, 2020	"Why Gua Sha Is the Original Form of At-Home Self-Care"	Vogue	
