= Rachel Khong =

American writer

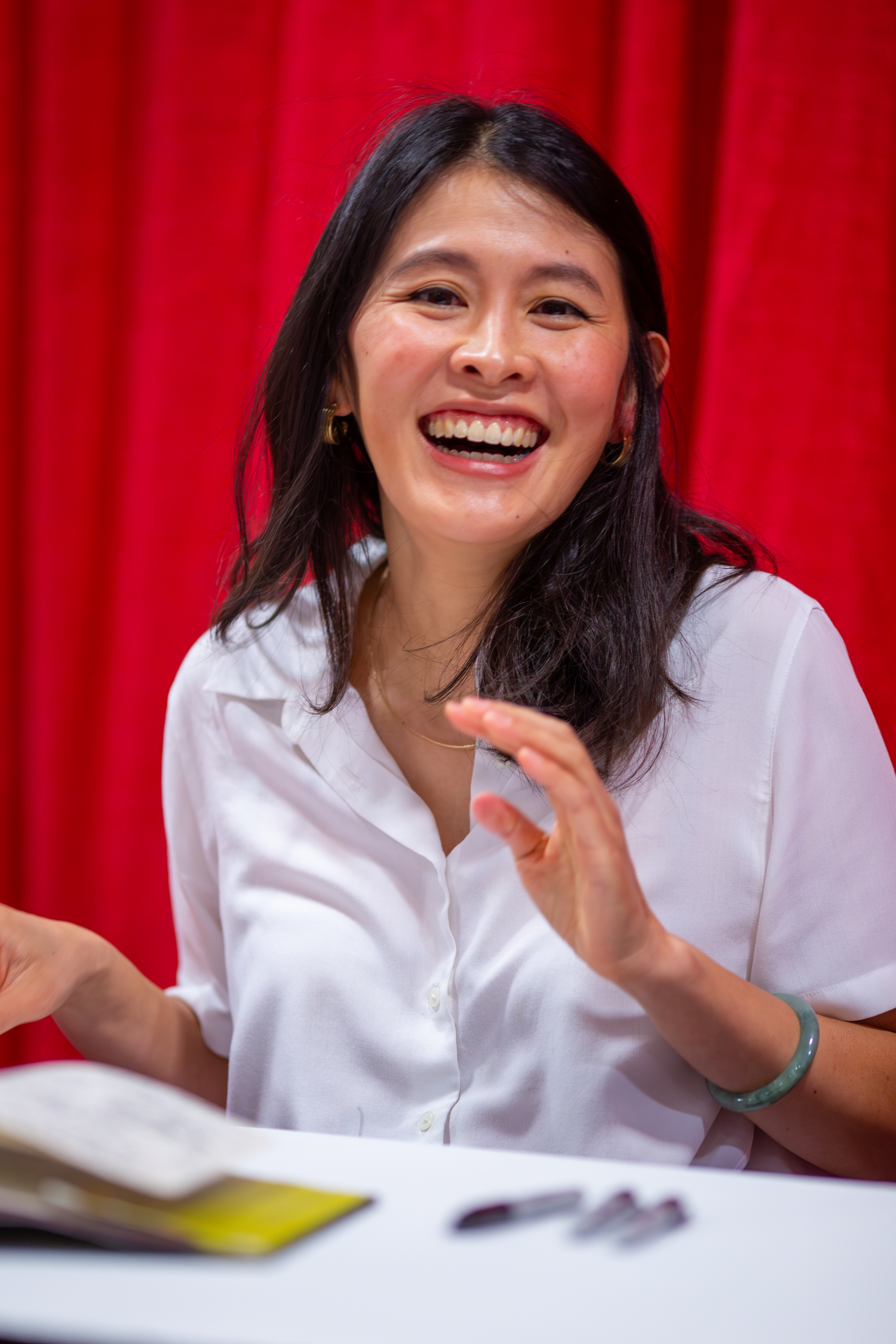
- Khong at the 2024 National Book Festival
- Born: 1985 (age 40–41)
- Education: Yale University; University of Florida
- Spouse: Eli Horowitz
- Writing career
- Notable works: Goodbye, Vitamin; Real Americans
- Website: www.rachelkhong.com

Rachel Khong (born 1985) is an American writer and editor based in Los Angeles as of 2021.

== Life ==
Khong was born in Malaysia to a Malaysian Chinese family, but they soon moved to the United States when she was two. She grew up in Rancho Cucamonga, California and attended high school in nearby Diamond Bar, California.

Khong attended Yale University and graduated with a degree in English in 2007. In 2011, she received her MFA from the University of Florida, where she studied with Padgett Powell.

Khong is married to Eli Horowitz, co-creator of Gimlet's Homecoming podcast and TV series and former editor at McSweeney's.

== Career ==
After completing her graduate degree, Khong moved to San Francisco and worked in the food service industry. She interned at McSweeney's while in college and edited cookbooks for them after graduating. In 2011, Chris Ying of Lucky Peach, who Khong had met while interning at McSweeney's, asked her to be the managing editor of the magazine. She later went on to become executive editor of Lucky Peach.

Khong cofounded The Ruby in 2018, a female oriented co-working space based in Mission District, San Francisco. She retired from managing the space and moved to Los Angeles in 2021.

=== Writing ===
Khong's writing has appeared in publications such as American Short Fiction, Joyland, and the San Francisco Chronicle. She is the coauthor of a cookbook from Lucky Peach called All About Eggs.

Her first novel, Goodbye, Vitamin, received Best Book of the Year honors from NPR, O, The Oprah Magazine, the San Francisco Chronicle, and Vogue. It was the winner of the California Book Award for first fiction. The story was inspired by her grandmother's battle with Alzheimer's disease. The novel won the 2017 California Book Award for First Fiction, as well as a Los Angeles Times Book Prize Finalist for First Fiction. Universal Pictures optioned the film rights in June 2019, with Constance Wu attached to lead.

FilmNation Entertainment announced on February 5, 2021 that they and Ali Wong are producing an adaptation of Khong's short story, The Freshening, with director Cathy Yan set to write and direct. She has written book reviews for the New York Times, including of novels by Maria Kuznetsova and Sarah Elaine Smith.

Her second novel, Real Americans, was a New York Times bestseller. The novel was chosen as the May 2024 Read with Jenna Book Club pick.

Her first story collection, My Dear You, was released by Knopf on April 7, 2026. Author Bryan Washington cited My Dear You as "one of [his] favorite books.”

== Works ==
=== Novels ===
- Goodbye, Vitamin (2017, Henry Holt) ISBN 9781471159480, OCLC 1015212743
- Real Americans (2024, Knopf) ISBN 9780593537251, OCLC 1374133903

=== Short story collections ===
- My Dear You (2026, Knopf) ISBN 9780593803691

=== Short stories ===
- Khong, Rachel (2020-08-10). "The Freshening". The Paris Review.
