= Goodbye, Vitamin =

2017 debut novel by Rachel Khong

- Author: Rachel Khong
- Publisher: Henry Holt and Company
- Publication date: July 11, 2017
- Pages: 208
- Awards: California Book Award for First Fiction
- ISBN: 978-1250109163
- Followed by: Real Americans

Goodbye, Vitamin is a 2017 debut novel by Rachel Khong, published by Henry Holt and Company. It made several recommended reading lists and won the California Book Award for First Fiction.

== Synopsis ==
The novel follows Ruth, a 30-year-old woman whose engagement falls through after her fiancé leaves her for another woman. When Ruth returns home for Christmas to see her parents, her mother asks her to stay long-term in order to tend to Ruth's father who has Alzheimer's disease. Ruth moves in, but family life at home isn't what she thought it would be. Written in the format of Ruth's diary, the novel follows a year of her at home.

== Critical reception ==
The novel was a finalist for the Art Seidenbaum Award for First Fiction.

Kirkus Reviews called it "a heartfelt family dramedy in a debut novel that ruminates on love, loss, and memory" and wrote that "Khong’s pithy observations and cynical humor round out a moving story that sparks empathy where you’d least expect it." Publishers Weekly said that "Though this foray into a family’s attempts to cope mostly skims the surface, it does gain depth as it progresses." In a starred review, Booklist stated "Khong ... writes heartbreaking family drama with charm, perfect prose, and deadpan humor."

Vogue reviewed the novel in an article with the title "Goodbye, Vitamin May Be the Best Novel You’ll Read This Summer". The New Yorker, in a brief review, noted its "quirky, diary-like bursts" and "beautiful quotidian details". The New York Times called it "a darkly comic yet heartfelt novel" and noted some of its "poignant passages". NPR lauded the novel's handling of family and cognitive decline. R. O. Kwon, for The Margins, called the novel "beguiling, hilarious, and insightful, often all at once." SFGate wrote that "Rachel Khong has managed to create an Alzheimer’s novel that is heartbreaking but also funny, offering a fresh take on the disease and possible outcomes both for the people suffering from it and their caretakers." The Los Angeles Review of Books called the novel "a testament to memory" and said "while the memory loss in Goodbye, Vitamin is a vehicle for humor and play, it ultimately is also a means of expressing absolute tenderhearted emotion." The Chicago Review of Books called it "a total pleasure to read." The Professional Women's Association at the University of California, Santa Barbara commended its "sweet structure" and Khong's "sensitivity toward her characters" which "gave them a delicate quality".

The Sydney Morning Herald said the novel "suffers from an odd instability of tone, as though Rachel Khong had been unable to make up her mind whether she was writing a comedy or a tragedy." The reviewer further stated that "both comedy and tragedy requires a firm grip on your material and a musician's gift for control of tone. Khong has neither, so this book is a bumpy if intermittently entertaining read."

The novel made several lists in 2017. O, The Oprah Magazine called it a best book of 2017. Huffington Post called it one of the best fiction books of 2017. PopSugar called it one of the best summer reads of the year, stating "every moment in the book is unpredictable, poignant, and downright fascinating." BuzzFeed News considered it an anticipated read for summer of 2017, writing that it was a "poignant insight into family, memory, marriage, parenthood, love, and loss.". Bustle included it on a similar list. Alta Journal picked the novel as the publication's book club selection for December 2024.

== Adaptations ==
In 2019, Universal Pictures acquired rights to the novel and announced Constance Wu as a lead actress.
