= Sheena Patel =

British author and poet

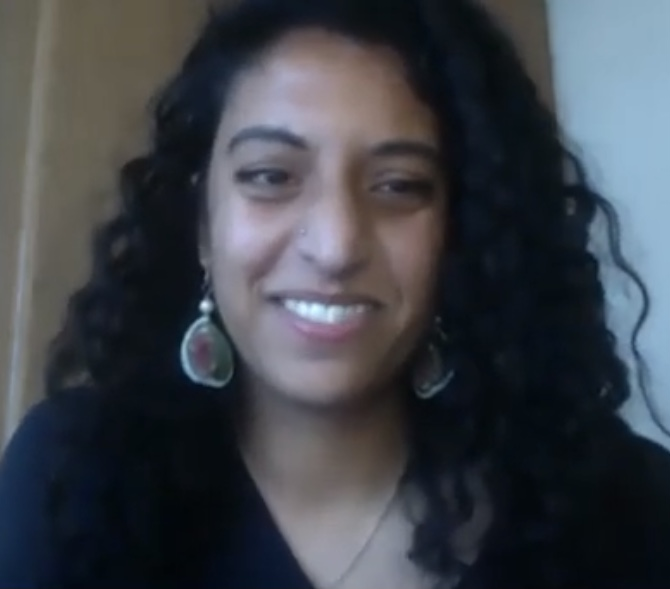
- Patel in 2021
- Education: Queen Mary University of London
- Occupation: Novelist
- Years active: 2017–present
- Known for: I'm a Fan (2022)

Sheena Patel is a British author. She is part of the collective 4 BROWN GIRLS WHO WRITE, with which she released her first published work, This Is What Love Is, as part of a set of pamphlets in a 2021 collection named for the collective.

Her debut novel, I'm a Fan, was published by Rough Trade Books in 2022 and received recognition including the Discover Book of the Year at the 2023 British Book Awards and The Observer Best Debut Novel of 2022. It was longlisted for the 2023 Women's Prize for Fiction and shortlisted for other accolades.

== Early life and education ==
Patel is a second-generation immigrant with a Kenyan-Indian father and a Mauritian mother. She was born in northwest London and was a voracious reader from early in life, reading what she describes as a large amount of "filthy books" for her young age.

She studied English literature at Queen Mary University alongside Sharan Hunjan and Rosh Goyate. The three women, along with Sunnah Khan, formed 4 BROWN GIRLS WHO WRITE in 2017.

== Career ==
The collective performed at the Edinburgh Festival Fringe before publishing its first collection in 2021. Patel's work on I'm a Fan came after the January 6 United States Capitol attack, when she observed that "Love and hate and destruction all became intertwined, and I thought, This is what it’s like being infatuated with someone who is emotionally unavailable." The novel was a critical success and won various awards.

Patel has previously worked in film and television as an assistant director.

== Bibliography ==
- —— (2022). I'm a Fan (hardcover 1st ed.). Aylesbury: Rough Trade Books. ISBN 9781914236150.
