= Saboteur (disambiguation) =

A saboteur is someone who commits sabotage.

Saboteur(s) or The Saboteur(s) may also refer to:

== Film and television ==
- Saboteur (film), a 1942 film directed by Alfred Hitchcock
- The Saboteur: Code Name Morituri or Morituri, a 1965 American film
- The Saboteurs (TV series) or The Heavy Water War, a 2015 television series

== Music ==
- The Raconteurs, known as The Saboteurs in Australia, an American rock band
- "Saboteur", a song by Amon Tobin from Supermodified
- "Saboteur", a song by Jethro Tull from Under Wraps
- "Saboteurs", a song by Sabaton from Coat of Arms

== Video games ==
- Saboteur (1985 video game), an action-adventure computer game
- Saboteur II: Avenging Angel, sequel of 1985's action-adventure game, released in 1987
- Saboteur, an unreleased 1980s Atari 2600 game by Howard Scott Warshaw, released on Atari Flashback in 2004
- The Saboteur, a 2009 video game
- The Saboteur (2010 video game), a mobile tie-in to the 2009 game

== Other uses ==
- Saboteur (card game), a 2004 card game by Frederic Moyersoen
- "Saboteur" (short story), a 1996 short story by Ha Jin
- The Saboteur, a 2017 novel by Andrew Gross
