= The Best American Short Stories 2000 =

2000 short story collection

- Editor: Katrina Kenison and E. L. Doctorow
- Language: English
- Series: The Best American Short Stories
- Published: 2000
- Publisher: Houghton Mifflin Harcourt
- Media type: Print (hardback & paperback)
- ISBN: 0395926866
- Preceded by: The Best American Short Stories 1999
- Followed by: The Best American Short Stories 2001

The Best American Short Stories 2000 is a volume in The Best American Short Stories series. It was edited by Katrina Kenison and by guest editor E. L. Doctorow.

== Short stories included ==
Author	Story	Source
Geoffrey Becker	"Black Elvis"	Ploughshares
Amy Bloom	"The Story"	Story
Michael Byers	"The Beautiful Days"	Ploughshares
Ron Carlson	"The Ordinary Son"	Oxford American
Raymond Carver	"Call If You Need Me"	Granta
Kiana Davenport	"Bones of the Inner Ear"	Story
Junot Díaz	"Nilda"	The New Yorker
Nathan Englander	"The Gilgul of Park Avenue"	The Atlantic Monthly
Percival Everett	"The Fix"	New York Stories
Tim Gautreaux	"Good for the Soul"	Story
Allan Gurganus	"He's at the Office"	The New Yorker
Aleksandar Hemon	"Blind Jozef Pronek"	The New Yorker
Kathleen Hill	"The Anointed"	DoubleTake
Ha Jin	"The Bridegroom"	Harper's Magazine
Marilyn Krysl	"The Thing Around Them"	Notre Dame Review
Jhumpa Lahiri	"The Third and Final Continent"	The New Yorker
Walter Mosley	"Pet Fly"	The New Yorker
ZZ Packer	"Brownies"	Harper's Magazine
Edith Pearlman	"Allog"	Ascent
Annie Proulx	"People in Hell Just Want a Drink of Water"	GQ
Frances Sherwood	"Basil the Dog"	The Atlantic Monthly
