= The Missouri Review =

American literary magazine

- Discipline: Literary magazine
- Language: English
- Edited by: Speer Morgan

Publication details
- History: 1978-present
- Publisher: University of Missouri (United States)
- Frequency: Quarterly

Standard abbreviations
- ISO 4: Mo. Rev.

Indexing
- ISSN: 0191-1961

Links
- Journal homepage

The Missouri Review is a literary magazine founded in 1978 by the University of Missouri. It publishes fiction, poetry, and creative non-fiction quarterly. With its open submission policy, The Missouri Review receives 12,000 manuscripts each year and is known for printing previously unpublished and emerging authors.

Each year, The Missouri Review hosts the Jeffrey E. Smith Editors' Prize contest with $15,000 in prize money for entries in fiction, essays, and poetry. The winners receive prize money, publication, and an invitation to a public awards reception.

The Missouri Review is available in print, digital, and audio formats.

== Honors and awards ==
- Mako Yoshikawa's essay "My Father's Women" appeared in The Best American Essays 2013 (ed. Cheryl Strayed).
- Rachel Riederer's essay "Patient" appeared in The Best American Essays 2011 (ed. Edwidge Danticat).
- Laura Yeager's short story, "Having Ann", was short-listed for an O. Henry Award in 2000.
- Molly Giles's short story, "Two Words", won an O. Henry Award in 2003.
- Steve Yarbrough's short story "The Rest of Her Life", appeared in The Best American Short Stories 1999 (ed. Amy Tan).
- R.T. Smith's short story, "Docent", appeared in The Best American Short Stories 2004 (ed. Lorrie Moore).
- David Shuman's short story, "Stay", was selected as one of the "100 Other Distinguished Stories of 2005" by The Best American Short Stories 2006 (ed. Ann Patchett).
- Susan Perabo's short story, "Treasure", was selected as one of the "100 Other Distinguished Stories of 2006" by The Best American Short Stories 2007 (ed. Stephen King).
- Jacob M. Appel's short story, "Creve Coeur", was selected as one of the "100 Other Distinguished Stories of 2007" by The Best American Short Stories 2008 (ed. Salman Rushdie).
- Katie Chase's story, "Man and Wife", appeared in The Best American Short Stories 2008 (ed. Salman Rushdie)
- L.E. Miller's story, "Kind", won an O. Henry Award in 2009.

== Notable contributors ==
- Steve Almond
- Jacob M. Appel
- Russell Banks
- Andrea Barrett
- Aimee Bender
- Robert Bly
- David Borofka
- Jesse Lee Brooks
- Frederick Busch
- Robert Olen Butler
- Michael Byers
- Moira Crohn
- Amy Hempel
- Bob Hicok
- Ha Jin
- Maxine Kumin
- Wally Lamb
- Ursula K. Le Guin
- Philip Levine
- Larry Levis
- Romulus Linney
- Bret Lott
- Naguib Mahfouz
- Bharati Mukherjee
- Joyce Carol Oates
- Dan O'Brien
- Bob Shacochis
- William Stafford
- Gerald Stern
- James Tate
- David Foster Wallace
- Joy Williams
- Tobias Wolff
- Daniel Woodrell

== Special projects ==
=== Found text ===
The Missouri Review also publishes "found text" projects, usually previously unpublished work by past literary figures. These include works by Mark Twain, Tennessee Williams, William Faulkner, Charlotte Brontë, Jack Kerouac and Marianne Moore.

=== History as literature ===
This series highlights diaries and journals of everyday citizens, giving perspective and insight into our past as a nation and people.

- As a young Choctaw Indian, Peter Pitchlynn gave what might be the only journal account by a Native American of the U.S. Government's policy of tribal removal in the mid-19th century Trail of Tears.
- A nurse in Cuba during the Spanish–American War in 1898, Amy Wingreen displayed bravery and a spirit of responsibility, helping to lead to the found of the Nurse Corps in 1901.
- The second African American to earn a Ph.D. from Harvard, Lorenzo Greene traveled through the south in 1930 selling books on black history.

=== Interviews ===
The Missouri Review features an interview in every issue. Notable interviewees have included the following authors.

- Jo Ann Beard
- Eric Bogosian
- Dan Chaon
- Sandra Cisneros
- Michael Cunningham
- Stuart Dybek
- Jessica Hagedorn
- Terrance Hayes
- Jamaica Kincaid
- Chuck Klosterman
- Li-Young Lee
- Benjamin Percy
- E. Annie Proulx
- David Sedaris
- Natasha Trethewey

== See also ==
- List of literary magazines
