= The Best American Short Stories 2008 =

2008 short story collection

- Editor: Salman Rushdie and Heidi Pitlor
- Language: English
- Series: The Best American Short Stories
- Media type: Print (hardback & paperback)
- Preceded by: The Best American Short Stories 2007
- Followed by: The Best American Short Stories 2009

The Best American Short Stories 2008, a volume in The Best American Short Stories series, was edited by Heidi Pitlor and by guest editor Salman Rushdie.

== Short stories included ==
Author	Story	Where story previously appeared
T. C. Boyle	"Admiral"	Harper's Magazine
Kevin Brockmeier	"The Year of Silence"	Ecotone
Karen Brown	"Galatea"	Crazyhorse
Katie Chase	"Man and Wife"	The Missouri Review
Danielle Evans	"Virgins"	Paris Review
Allegra Goodman	"Closely Held"	Ploughshares
A. M. Homes	"May We Be Forgiven"	Granta
Nicole Krauss	"From the Desk of Daniel Varsky"	Harper's Magazine
Jonathan Lethem	"The King of Sentences"	The New Yorker
Rebecca Makkai	"The Worst You Ever Feel"	Shenandoah
Steven Millhauser	"The Wizard of West Orange"	Harper's Magazine
Daniyal Mueenuddin	"Nawabdin Electrician"	The New Yorker
Alice Munro	"Child's Play"	Harper's Magazine
Miroslav Penkov	"Buying Lenin"	The Southern Review
Karen Russell	"Vampires in the Lemon Grove"	Zoetrope
George Saunders	"Puppy"	The New Yorker
Christine Sneed	"Quality of Life"	The New England Review
Bradford Tice	"Missionaries"	The Atlantic Monthly
Mark Wisniewski	"Straightaway"	The Antioch Review
Tobias Wolff	"Bible"	The Atlantic Monthly

== Other notable stories ==
In his introduction to the volume, Rushdie named several other writers whom he said that he was "sad to have left out" including Andre Aciman, David Foster Wallace, Rick DeMarinis, Beverly Jensen, Erin Soros, Shena McAuliffe, Brendan Mathews and Andrew Sean Greer. Among the other notable writers whose stories were among the "100 Other Distinguished Stories of 2007" were Daniel Alarcón, Jacob Appel, John Barth, Stuart Dybek, Mary Gordon, Marjorie Kemper, Stephen King, Molly McNett, Antonya Nelson, Jim Shepard, Melanie Rae Thon and John Updike.
