= The Best American Short Stories 1997 =

Short story compilation

- Editor: Katrina Kenison and E. Annie Proulx
- Language: English
- Series: The Best American Short Stories
- Published: 1997
- Publisher: Houghton Mifflin Harcourt
- Media type: Print (hardback & paperback)
- ISBN: 0395798655
- Preceded by: The Best American Short Stories 1996
- Followed by: The Best American Short Stories 1998

The Best American Short Stories 1997, a volume in The Best American Short Stories series, was edited by Katrina Kennison and by guest editor E. Annie Proulx. This was the first and only year that the stories were formally grouped by category, rather than alphabetically.

== Short stories included ==
=== Category: Manners and Right Behavior ===
Author	Story	Source
Ha Jin	"Saboteur"	The Antioch Review
Robert Stone	"Under the Pitons"	Esquire
Carolyn Cooke	"Bob Darling"	The Paris Review
Jonathan Franzen	"Chez Lambert"	The Paris Review

=== Category: Identifying the Stranger ===
Author	Story	Source
Michelle Cliff	"Transactions"	TriQuarterly
Richard Bausch	"Nobody in Hollywood"	The New Yorker
Cynthia Ozick	"Save My Child!"	The New Yorker
Karen E. Bender	"Eternal Love"	Granta
Leonard Michaels	"A Girl with a Monkey"	Partisan Review
Lydia Davis	"St. Martin"	Grand Street

=== Category: Perceived Social Values ===
Author	Story	Source
Junot Díaz	"Fiesta, 1980"	Story
Donald Hall	"From Willow Temple"	The Atlantic Monthly
T. Coraghessan Boyle	"Killing Babies"	The New Yorker
Clyde Edgerton	"Send Me to the Electric Chair"	The Oxford American
June Spence	"Missing Women"	The Southern Review
Jeffrey Eugenides	"Air Mail"	The Yale Review
Pam Durban	"Soon"	The Southern Review

=== Category: Rites of Passage ===
Author	Story	Source
Michael Byers	"Shipmates Down Under"	American Short Fiction
Tobias Wolff	"Powder"	Fish Stories
Alyson Hagy	"Search Bay"	Ploughshares
Tim Gautreaux	"Little Frogs in a Ditch"	Gentlemen's Quarterly
