= Edith Pearlman =

American short story writer (1936–2023)

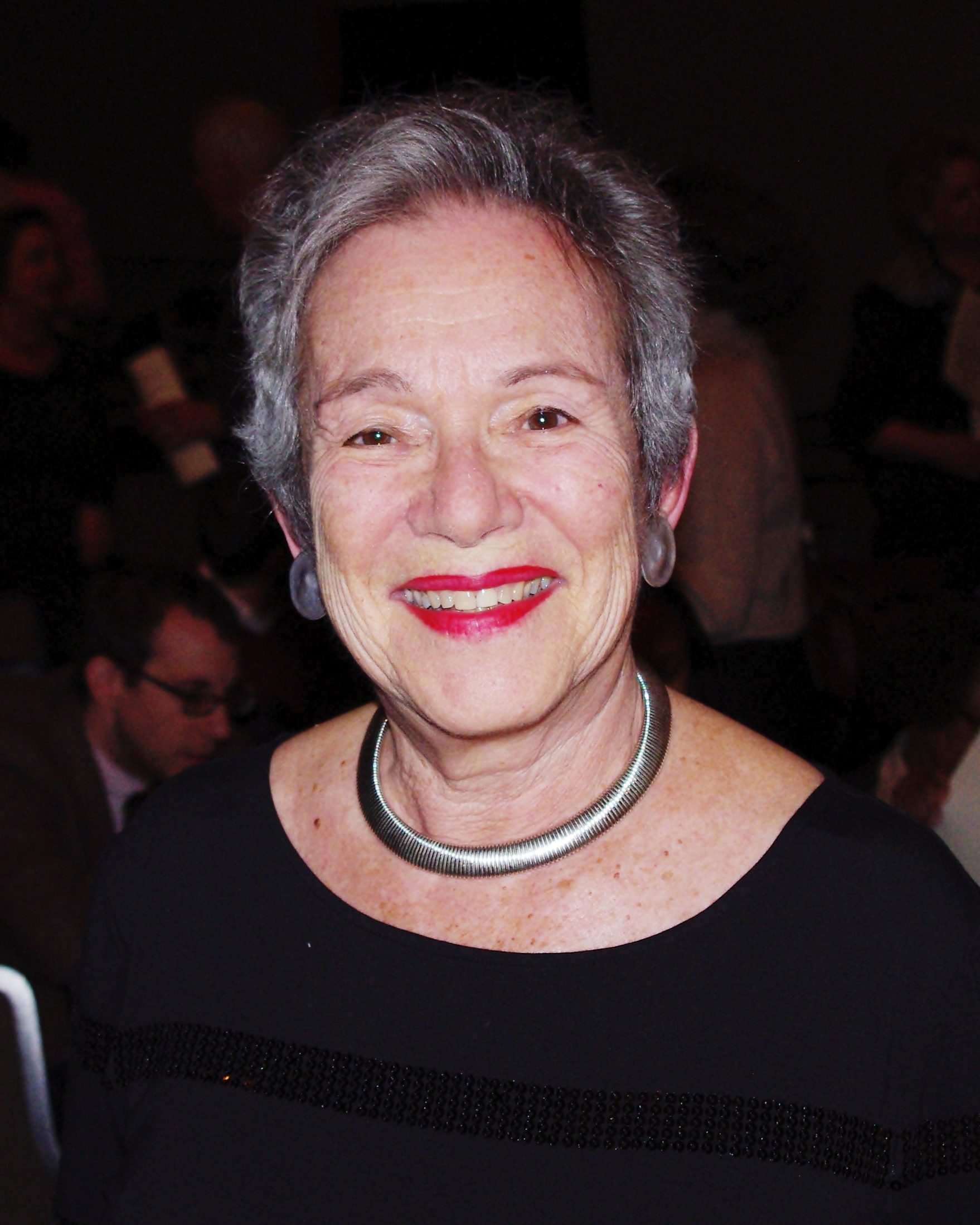
- Pearlman in 2012
- Born: Edith Ann Grossman; June 26, 1936; Providence, Rhode Island, U.S.
- Died: January 1, 2023 (aged 86); Brookline, Massachusetts, U.S.
- Education: Radcliffe College
- Occupation: Writer

Edith Ann Pearlman (née Grossman; June 26, 1936 – January 1, 2023) was an American short story writer.

== Early life and career ==
Pearlman was born in Providence, Rhode Island, where she grew up in a middle-class Jewish neighborhood, the daughter of Edna (Rosen) and Herman Paul Grossman, an ophthalmologist. Her father was born in Ukraine, and her maternal grandparents emigrated from Poland. She graduated from Radcliffe College. She has worked in a computer firm and a soup kitchen and has served in the Town Meeting of Brookline, Massachusetts.

Her non-fiction has appeared in The Atlantic Monthly, Smithsonian, Preservation, and Ploughshares. Her travel writing – about the Cotswolds, Budapest, Jerusalem, Paris, and Tokyo – has been published in The New York Times and elsewhere.

In January 2015, her fifth collection of short stories, Honeydew, was chosen as one of Oprah Winfrey's "top 19 books to read right now".

== Personal life and death ==
Pearlman lived in Brookline, Massachusetts, with her husband. They had two children.

Pearlman died in Brookline on January 1, 2023, at the age of 86.

== Awards and honors ==
- 2014 Jewish Quarterly-Wingate Prize, shortlist, Binocular Vision
- 2012 National Book Critics Circle Award, Binocular Vision
- 2011 Edward Lewis Wallant Award, Binocular Vision
- 2011 PEN/Malamud Award
- 2011 National Book Award for Fiction, finalist, Binocular Vision
- 2008 Pushcart Prize XXXIII, "Door Psalm"
- 2006 The Best American Short Stories 2006, "Self-Reliance"
- 2003 The PEN/O. Henry Prize Stories, "The Story"
- 2001 Pushcart Prize XXV, "Mates"
- 2000 The Best American Short Stories 2000, "Allog"
- 1999 The Antioch Review Distinguished Fiction Award
- 1998 The Best American Short Stories 1998, "Chance"
- 1991 Syndicated Fiction Award (from NEA)
- 1987 Syndicated Fiction Award
- 1984 The PEN/O. Henry Prize Stories, "Conveniences"
- 1978 The PEN/O. Henry Prize Stories, "Hanging Fire"

== Works ==
=== Short story collections ===
- Vaquita and Other Stories. University of Pittsburgh Press. 1996. ISBN 9780822962113. Winner of the Drue Heinz Literature Prize
- Love Among the Greats and Other Stories. Eastern Washington University Press. 2002. ISBN 9780910055802. Winner of Spokane Prize for Literature
- How to Fall: Stories. Sarabande Books. 2005. ISBN 9781932511116. Winner of Mary McCarthy Prize
- Binocular Vision: New and Selected Stories. Lookout Books. 2011. ISBN 9780982338292.
- Honeydew: Stories. Little, Brown and Company. 2014. ISBN 9780316297226.

=== Anthologies ===
- Kathleen Coskran; Calvin William Truesdale, eds. (1998). An Inn Near Kyoto: Writing by American Women Abroad. New Rivers Press. ISBN 9780898231816.
- David Farley; Jessie Sholl, eds. (2006). "The Kiss". Prague and the Czech Republic: True Stories. Travelers' Tales. ISBN 9781932361339.

=== Stories ===
Title	Publication	Collected in
"Which Eleanor Am I?"	Seventeen (May 1969)	-
"The Liniments of Love"	Seventeen (September 1969)	-
"Ring Out the New"	Seventeen (December 1969)	-
"Her Own Kind"	Seventeen (May 1970)	-
"One Touch of a Wizard's Wand"	Redbook (August 1972)	-
"At Miss Elvira's"	Ingenue (April 1973)	-
"Menage"	Carleton Miscellany 15.1 (Fall 1974-Winter 1975)	-
"New Year's Eve at the Litvans'"	Ascent 3.1 (Winter 1977)	-
"Hanging Fire"	The Massachusetts Review 18.1 (Spring 1977)	Binocular Vision
"Sydney"	Ascent 4.1 (Winter 1978)	-
"Bun"	Ascent (1980–81)	-
"Dreaming"	Ascent (1981)	-
"Conveniences"	Ascent 8.1 (Winter 1982)	Honeydew
"The Book"	New England Review 4.3 (Spring 1982)	-
"The Silent Wound"	Ascent (1983)	-
"National Characters"	StoryQuarterly (Spring 1984)	-
"Legacy"	Ascent (Fall 1984)	-
"Lou in New York"	CrossCurrents 5.2 (Spring 1985)	-
"Settlers"	Commentary (January 1986)	Vaquita
"Felix's Business"	New England Review/Bread Loaf Quarterly 8.4 (Summer 1986)	Vaquita
"A Family Trait"	Ascent (Spring 1987)	-
"Boy Meets Girl"	PEN Syndicated Fiction (Summer 1987)	-
"Sunday Suppers"	Other Voices 6/7 (Fall 1987)	-
"The Large Lady"	CrossCurrents (Fall 1987)	How to Fall
"Art of the Camera"	Oak Square (Fall 1987)	-
"Dear Hearts"	Boston Review (February 1988)	-
"Their Pride and Joy"	Redbook (May 1988)	-
"Hands Across the Sea"	Redstart (June 1988)	-
"Protector"	Ascent (Summer 1988)	-
"The King of Sweden"	The Alaska Quarterly Review 7.1/2 (Fall 1988-Winter 1989)	-
"Swampmaiden"	The Iowa Review 19.1 (Winter 1989)	-
"Tongues"	New England Review/Bread Loaf Quarterly 12.2 (Winter 1989)	-
"Edict"	Tikkun (March/April 1989)	-
"Blanche's Season"	Other Voices 10 (Spring 1989)	-
"Their Dan"	The Massachusetts Review 31.4 (Winter 1990)	-
"The Folks at Home"	The Iowa Review 20.1 (Winter 1990)	-
"June the Twentieth"	Oak Square (Winter 1990)	-
"Her Day"	Response (Winter 1990)	-
"Eighteen Questions"	The Alaska Quarterly Review 8.3/4 (Spring-Summer 1990)	-
"Donna's Heart"	Ascent (Fall 1990)	Vaquita
"Brief Lives"	Thema (Fall 1990)	-
"The Mid-Day Fairy"	The Fiddlehead 165 (Autumn 1990)	-
"The Handkerchief"	Phoebe: An Interdisciplinary Journal of Feminist Scholarship, Theory and Aesthetics 2.2 (Fall 1990)	-
"Aunt Irma Adjusts to Her New Surroundings"	Kalliope: A Journal of Women's Art 12.3 (1990)	-
"The Lives of the Aunts"	The Iowa Review 21.1 (Winter 1991)	-
"I Remember You"	CrossCurrents 5.4/6 (Winter 1991)	-
"Sweet Counsel"	Gopherwood Review (Winter 1991)	-
"Moving Day"	Villager (Winter 1991)	-
"Left-Handed Girl"	Thema (Spring 1991)	-
"Ledivan's Quest"	Ascent (Summer 1991)	-
"Honeymoon"	CrossCurrents (1991)	-
"One Not Chosen"	Event (Spring 1992)	-
"Some Turbulence"	Sound of Writing (Spring 1992)	-
"The Non-Combatant"	The Alaska Quarterly Review 10.3/4 (Spring-Summer 1992)	Vaquita
"The Game of the Name"	The Jewish Spectator (Summer 1992)	-
"Nate, Dead and Alive"	Emrys Journal (Summer 1992)	-
"Going to the Barn"	Gopherwood Review (Summer 1992)	-
"Madeleines"	Kalliope: A Journal of Women's Art 14.1 (1992)	-
"Stranger in the House"	Tikkun 8.1 (January–February 1993)	Vaquita
"Binocular Vision"	The Boston Globe (March 21, 1993)	Binocular Vision
"Dorothea"	Witness (Spring 1993)	Vaquita
"Rehearsals"	Ascent (Spring 1993)	Vaquita
"I Follow My Wife"	The Massachusetts Review 34.1 (Spring 1993)	-
"The Cook"	The Alaska Quarterly Review 11.3/4 (Spring-Summer 1993)	Vaquita
"All the Things You Are"	Thema (Fall 1993)	-
"All Their Sins"	Whetstone (1993)	-
"Marlene Tighe Winokaur"	Kalliope: A Journal of Women's Art 15.2 (1993)	-
"The Thought of You"	Other Voices 20 (Spring 1994)	Love Among the Greats
"Worldviews"	Emrys Journal (Spring 1994)	-
"Quality Time"	Mothering (June 1994)	-
"Day of Awe" aka "To Reach This Season"	The Alaska Quarterly Review 13.1/2 (Fall 1994-Winter 1995)	Vaquita
"Rules"	Witness 8.2 (1994)	How to Fall
"Timing"	Magic Realism (Winter 1995)	-
"Devil's Trill"	This (Winter 1995)	-
"Watching Isabel"	Event (Winter 1995)	-
"Sympathizer"	The Massachusetts Review 36.1 (Spring 1995)	-
"Swans"	Santa Barbara Review (Summer 1995)	-
"Vegetarian Chili"	Happy (Fall 1995)	How to Fall
"Inbound"	The Boston Globe (November 26, 1995)	Vaquita
"Charity"	Ascent (Spring 1996)	Vaquita
"Allergies"	The Antioch Review 54.4 (Autumn 1996)	-
"Cavalier"	Witness 10.2 (1996)	Vaquita
"Vaquita"	Vaquita (November 1996)	Vaquita
"The Headwaiter's Son"	Vaquita (November 1996)	Vaquita
"Afternoons"	Vaquita (November 1996)	Vaquita
"Fedra's Wings"	Santa Barbara Review (Spring 1997)	-
"Abundance"	Widener Review (Summer 1997)	-
"Adventures of Henriette"	Whetstone (Summer 1997)	-
"Chance"	The Antioch Review 55.4 (Autumn 1997)	Love Among the Greats
"Eyesore"	Ascent (Fall 1997)	How to Fall
"Poste Restante"	Kalliope: A Journal of Women's Art 19.2 (1997)	-
"Gaffer's Delights"	The Antioch Review 56.4 (Autumn 1998)	-
"A Gentle Heart"	CrossCurrents (Fall 1998)	-
"Deliverance"	Ascent 23.1 (Fall 1998)	Honeydew
"Home Schooling"	The Alaska Quarterly Review 17.1/2 (Fall 1997-Winter 1998)	How to Fall
"The Message"	An Inn in Kyoto: Writing by American Women Abroad (1998)	How to Fall
"Imre's Fate"	Sweet Annie & Sweet Pea Review (1998)	-
"ToyFolk"	Ascent (Winter 1999)	Love Among the Greats
"Christmas Eve"	Evansville Review (Spring 1999)	-
"Accomodators"	The Antioch Review 57.4 (Autumn 1999)	Love Among the Greats
"Allog"	Ascent (Fall 1999)	Love Among the Greats
"Rescue"	Bananafish (Fall 1999-Winter 2000)	-
"Girl and Marble Boy"	The Atlantic (December 29, 1999)	-
"The Shrug"	Witness 13.2 (1999)	-
"Fitting"	The Kenyon Review 22.1 (Winter 2000)	Love Among the Greats
"End of the World"	Larcom Review (January 2000)	-
"The Jigsaw Table"	Yankee (July–August 2000)	Love Among the Greats
"Skin Deep"	The Antioch Review 58.4 (Autumn 2000)	-
"Mates"	Pleiades (2000)	How to Fall
"Finery"	Ascent (2000)	-
"Love Among the Greats"	Ascent (Winter 2001)	Love Among the Greats
"Neighbors"	Ascent (Fall 2001)	Love Among the Greats
"Unravished Bride"	Pleiades (2001)	Binocular Vision
"Trifle"	West Branch (Spring 2002)	How to Fall
"The Story"	The Alaska Quarterly Review 19.3/4 (Spring-Summer 2002)	How to Fall
"If Love Were All"	Turnrow 2.1 (Summer 2002)	How to Fall
"On Our Own"	On the Page 8 (Autumn 2002)	-
"Big Fish"	Pleiades	Love Among the Greats
"Fidelity"	Love Among the Greats (November 2002)	Love Among the Greats
"Tess" aka "Tess's Team"	Love Among the Greats (November 2002)	Love Among the Greats
"Sonya's Place"	Love Among the Greats (November 2002)	Love Among the Greats
"Up"	Kalliope: A Journal of Women's Literature and Art 23.3/24.1 (2002)	-
"Calvin"	Witness 16.1 (2002)	-
"Shenanigans"	Ascent (Winter 2003)	How to Fall
"Beau Geste"	Ascent (Fall 2003)	-
"Night People"	Northeast Magazine (Fall 2003)	-
"Silence"	Hotel Amerika 2.1 (Fall 2003)	-
"How to Fall"	Idaho Review 5 (2003)	How to Fall
"Dream Children"	Post Road 7 (Fall 2003-Winter 2004)	Honeydew
"The Good Life"	Ascent (2003)	-
"Madame Guralnik"	Midstream (February–March 2004)	How to Fall
"Envy"	Thema 16.1 (Spring 2004)	-
"Lost Joy"	Epiphany 1 (Spring-Summer 2004)	-
"Prodigal Niece"	The Antioch Review 62.3 (Summer 2004)	-
"The Coat"	Idaho Review 6 (2004)	How to Fall
"Purim Night"	Witness 18.1 (2004)	How to Fall
"Flip and Marian"	Kalliope: A Journal of Women's Literature and Art 26.2 (2004)	-
"Self-Reliance"	Lake Effect 9 (Spring 2005)	Binocular Vision
"Granski"	The Antioch Review 63.3 (Summer 2005)	Binocular Vision
"South Market"	Pakn Treger (Summer 2005)	-
"Mimi"	Mid-American Review 26.1 (Fall 2005)	-
"Girl in Blue with Brown Bag"	West Branch 57 (Fall 2005-Winter 2006)	-
"Signs of Life"	How to Fall (2005)	How to Fall
"On Junius Bridge"	Agni 61 (2005)	Binocular Vision
"Diplomacy"	Salamander 11.1 (2005/2006)	-
"Speak to Me of Love"	Lake Effect 10 (Spring 2006)	-
"Aunt Telephone"	The Antioch Review 64.3 (Summer 2006)	Binocular Vision
"Life Jackets"	Crab Orchard Review 11.2 (Summer-Fall 2006)	-
"Lineage"	Idaho Review 8 (2006)	Binocular Vision
"Her Cousin Jamie"	Salamander 12.1 (2006/2007)	Honeydew
"Puck"	Ascent 30.2 (Winter 2007)	Honeydew
"Relic and Type"	Pakn Treger (Spring 2007)	Binocular Vision
"Elder Jinks"	The Antioch Review 65.4 (Fall 2007)	Binocular Vision
"The Golden Swan"	The Alaska Quarterly Review 24.3/4 (Fall-Winter 2007)	Honeydew
"Cul-de-Sac"	Agni 65 (2007)	Honeydew
"Gifts"	An Intricate Weave, ed. Marlene Miller (2007)	-
"The Ministry of Restraint"	Ecotone 7 (Winter 2008)	Binocular Vision
"Assisted Living"	Ascent 31.2 (Winter 2008)	Honeydew
"Hat Trick"	The Cincinnati Review 4.2 (Winter 2008)	Honeydew
"Snoop"	Lake Effect 12 (Spring 2008)	-
"The Little Wife"	Ontario Review 68 (Spring-Summer 2008)	Binocular Vision
"Guides"	Ascent (Fall 2008)	-
"The Transparent House"	Writecorner Press (2008)	-
"First Fruits"	Sonora Review 52 (2008)	-
"Exit Nurse"	Superstition Review 3 (Spring 2009)	-
"Tale"	The Cincinnati Review 6.1 (Summer 2009)	-
"Castle 4"	The Alaska Quarterly Review 26.3/4 (Fall 2009-Winter 2010)	Honeydew
"Capers"	Ascent (2009)	Binocular Vision
"Jan Term"	Idaho Review 10 (2009)	Binocular Vision
"It Is I"	VerbSap (Winter 2010)	-
"Niche"	The Antioch Review 36.2 (Spring 2010)	-
"Big Sister"	The Massachusetts Review 51.2 (Summer 2010)	-
"Flowers" aka "Hearts and Flowers"	The Cincinnati Review 7.1 (Summer 2010)	Honeydew
"Vallies"	Ecotone 10 (Fall 2010)	Binocular Vision
"Tenderfoot"	Idaho Review 11/12 (2010-2011)	Honeydew
"Sentimental Ballads"	Passages North 32.1 (Winter-Spring 2011)	-
"Skylight"	Lake Effect 15 (Spring 2011)	-
"Honeydew"	Orion (September–October 2011)	Honeydew
"S. faux"	The American Scholar 81.1 (Winter 2012)	-
"Life Lessons"	The Cincinnati Review 8.2 (Winter 2012)	-
"Last Words"	Shenandoah (Winter-Spring 2012)	-
"Grossie"	The Antioch Review 70.3 (Summer 2012)	-
"Just So"	Virginia Quarterly Review 88.3 (Summer 2012)	-
"The Kargman Affliction"	Moment (July 2012)	-
"What the Ax Forgets the Tree Remembers" aka "The Ax Forgets, the Tree Remembers"	Ecotone 14 (Fall 2012)	Honeydew
"Stone"	Agni 75 (2012)	Honeydew
"The Gentle Girl"	Iron Horse Review 14.6 (2012)	-
"Wait and See"	The American Scholar 82.1 (Winter 2013)	Honeydew
"Decorum"	The Antioch Review 71.4 (Fall 2013)	-
"The Descent of Happiness"	Epiphany 13 (Fall 2013-Winter 2014)	Honeydew
"Blessed Harry"	Harvard Review 44 (2013)	Honeydew
"Exultemus"	Imaginary Oklahoma, ed. Jeff Martin (2013)	-
"Sonny"	Fifth Wednesday Journal 14 (Spring 2014)	Honeydew
"Fishwater"	Ploughshares 40.2/3 (Fall 2014)	Honeydew
"First Lady"	Idaho Review 14 (2014)	-
"Comfort"	The Saturday Evening Post (July–August 2016)	-
