= The Bridegroom (short story collection) =

- First edition
- Author: Ha Jin
- Language: English
- Genre: Short stories
- Set in: China
- Publisher: Pantheon
- Publication date: October 3, 2000
- Publication place: United States
- Pages: 225

The Bridegroom is a collection of twelve short stories by Chinese-American author Ha Jin. The stories are set in Muji City in contemporary China, the same provincial city that served as the setting for his novel Waiting.

== Contents ==
| Story | Originally published in |
|---|---|
| "Saboteur" | The Antioch Review |
| "Alive" | AGNI |
| "In the Kindergarten" | Five Points |
| "A Tiger-Fighter Is Hard to Find" | The Oxford American |
| "Broken" | Columbia |
| "The Bridegroom" | Harper's |
| "An Entrepreneur's Story" | Witness |
| "Flame" | Missouri Review |
| "A Bad Joke" | Manoa |
| "An Official Reply" | Shenandoah |
| "The Woman from New York" | The Boston Book Review |
| "After Cowboy Chicken Came to Town" | TriQuarterly |

"Saboteur," "The Bridegroom," and "After Cowboy Chicken Came to Town" were subsequently included in The Best American Short Stories series.
