= In the Pond =

1998 novel by Ha Jin

- First edition
- Author: Ha Jin
- Language: English
- Publisher: Zoland Books
- Publication date: Nov 1998
- Publication place: United States
- Media type: Print
- Pages: 178
- ISBN: 0-944072-92-5
- OCLC: 43403434

In the Pond is a 1998 novel by Ha Jin.

== Overview ==
The novel centers on the character Shao Bin, a Chinese man working at a fertilizer plant, and his struggle to obtain a decent apartment for his young family. Continually passed over by the plant's corrupt leaders, Bin decides to fight back against his communist superiors. Conflict ensues when Bin's struggle is met with counterattacks and opposition he could never have imagined.

== Reception ==
Phyllis Alesia Perry, writing for The Atlanta Journal-Constitution, found that despite this being Jin's first book, his "story-telling rarely missteps."
