= The Best American Short Stories 1999 =

1999 short story collection

- Editor: Katrina Kenison and Amy Tan
- Language: English
- Series: The Best American Short Stories
- Published: 1999
- Publisher: Houghton Mifflin Harcourt
- Media type: Print (hardback & paperback)
- ISBN: 039592684X
- Preceded by: The Best American Short Stories 1998
- Followed by: The Best American Short Stories 2000

The Best American Short Stories 1999, a volume in The Best American Short Stories series, was edited by Katrina Kenison and by guest editor Amy Tan.

== Short stories included ==
Author	Story	Source
Rick Bass	"The Hermit's Story"	The Paris Review
Junot Díaz	"The Sun, the Moon, the Stars"	The New Yorker
Chitra Divakaruni	"Mrs. Dutta Writes A Letter"	The Atlantic Monthly
Stephen Dobyns	"Kansas"	Clackamas Literary Review
Nathan Englander	"The Tumblers"	American Short Fiction
Tim Gautreaux	"The Piano Tuner"	Harper's Magazine
Melissa Hardy	"The Uncharted Heart"	Ontario Review
George Harrar	"The 5:22"	Story
A. Hemon	"Islands"	Ploughshares
Pam Houston	"The Best Girlfriend You Never Had"	Other Voices
Ha Jin	"In the Kindergarten"	Five Points
Heidi Julavits	"Marry the One Who Gets There First"	Esquire
Hester Kaplan	"Live Life King-Sized"	Press
Sheila Kohler	"Africans"	Story
Jhumpa Lahiri	"Interpreter of Maladies"	AGNI
Lorrie Moore	"Real Estate"	The New Yorker
Alice Munro	"Save the Reaper"	The New Yorker
Annie Proulx	"The Bunchgrass at the Edge of the World"	The New Yorker
James Spencer	"The Robbers of Karnataka"	The Gettysburg Review
Samrat Upadhyay	"The Good Shopkeeper"	Manoa
Steve Yarbrough	"The Rest of Her Life"	The Missouri Review
