= A Distant Center =

2018 poetry collection by Ha Jin

- Author: Ha Jin
- Genre: Poetry
- Publisher: Copper Canyon Press
- Publication date: April 24, 2018
- Pages: 71
- ISBN: 978-1-55659-462-5

A Distant Center is a 2018 poetry collection by Ha Jin, published by Copper Canyon Press. In 2019, it won a PEN Oakland/Josephine Miles Literary Award.

== Form ==
The poems were originally written in Chinese and then rewritten in English. They explore themes like exile, immigration, and China's political history, drawing on the tradition of the Misty Poets.

== Critical reception ==
Publishers Weekly praised Jin's "honest, restrained look at his philosophies about home, writing, and staying true to oneself," calling the poems "muted, yet arresting."

The Asian Review of Books called the book "ambitious and original" as well as "witty, metaphorical, and imbued with tenderness," praising how it reveals "the reverberations of home for those who have left it."

The International Examiner found the collection a reminder of Jin's multifaceted talents as a writer, not merely as a fiction writer but also as a poet: "His poems spend their time in simple language but show a sophistication of character. The poet speaks behind distances. His understanding steps in between a prayer and the possibilities offered to the poet by just a piece of paper."
