= The Best American Short Stories 1998 =

1998 short story collection

- Editor: Katrina Kenison and Garrison Keillor
- Language: English
- Series: The Best American Short Stories
- Published: 1998
- Publisher: Houghton Mifflin Harcourt
- Media type: Print (hardback & paperback)
- ISBN: 0395875145
- Preceded by: The Best American Short Stories 1997
- Followed by: The Best American Short Stories 1999

The Best American Short Stories 1998, a volume in The Best American Short Stories series, was edited by Katrina Kenison and by guest editor Garrison Keillor.

== Short stories included ==
Author	Story	Source
Kathryn Chetkovich	"Appetites"	Zyzzyva
Poe Ballantine	"The Blue Devils of Blue River Avenue"	The Sun
Diane Schoemperlen	"Body Language"	Story
Edith Pearlman	"Chance"	The Antioch Review
Akhil Sharma	"Cosmopolitan"	The Atlantic Monthly
Carol Anshaw	"Elvis Has Left the Building"	Story
Chris Adrian	"Every Night for a Thousand Years"	The New Yorker
Maxine Swann	"Flower Children"	Ploughshares
Emily Carter	"Glory Goes and Gets Some"	Open City
Annie Proulx	"The Half-Skinned Steer"	The Atlantic Monthly
Doran Larson	"Morphine"	Virginia Quarterly Review
Bliss Broyard	"Mr. Sweetly Indecent"	Ploughshares
John Updike	"My Father on the Verge of Disgrace"	The New Yorker
Matthew Crain	"Penance"	Harper's Magazine
Lorrie Moore	"People Like That Are the Only People Here"	The New Yorker
Meg Wolitzer	"Tea at the House"	Ploughshares
Antonya Nelson	"Unified Front"	The Midwesterner
Padgett Powell	"Wayne in Love"	New England Review
Tim Gautreaux	"Welding with Children"	The Atlantic Monthly
Hester Kaplan	"Would You Know It Wasn't Love"	Gulf Coast

== Other notable stories ==
Among the other notable writers whose stories were among the "100 Other Distinguished Stories of 1997" were Ann Beattie, T. C. Boyle, Michael Chabon, Louise Erdrich, Jeffrey Eugenides, Tess Gallagher, Joyce Carol Oates, Annie Proulx, and Tobias Wolff.
