= Ocean of Words =

1996 short story collection by Ha Jin

- Hardcover edition
- Author: Ha Jin
- Language: English
- Subject: War, Chinese Army
- Genre: Short stories
- Set in: China
- Publisher: Zoland
- Publication date: 1996
- Publication place: United States
- Pages: 205
- Awards: PEN/Hemingway Award

Ocean of Words is a short story collection by Ha Jin. It is his first published book. The stories are set along the China-Soviet border in the 1970s after the nations split political ties.

The collection won the 1997 PEN/Hemingway Award for best first work of fiction.

== Contents ==
Story	Originally published in
"A Report"	
"Too Late"	
"Uncle Piao's Birthday Dinners"	
"Love in the Air"	Yellow Silk
"Dragon Head"	AGNI
"A Contract"	
"Miss Jee"	
"A Lecture"	
"The Russian Prisoner"	Witness
"The Fellow Townsmen"	
"My Best Soldier"	AGNI
"Ocean of Words"	Chelsea

== Synopsis ==
=== "A Report" ===
Chen Jun writes a letter to Commissar Lin apologizing about an incident in which his Reconnaissance Company sang a counterrevolutionary song during one of their marches through Longmen City in Northeast China.

=== "Too Late" ===
During the Spring Festival, Kong Kai goes from near the China-Soviet border at the Wusuli River to Shanghai to spend the night with girls at the Youth Home in Garlic Village. He simply sleeps on the bed with his own quilt; the girls take turns keeping watch of him as he sleeps. Commander Deng and the narrator arrive and interrogate Kai and the girls and they learn that he has not done much but go AWOL. After reports that Kai frequently leaves the barracks for the night, the officers decide to hold an election of “exemplary soldiers” for their men; Kai is not chosen despite all the other squad leaders receiving the honor.

Commander Deng and the narrator decide to call Kai into their officer again; they learn that during his outings that he received a message from An Mali, a twenty-three-year-old woman claiming she knows his name is Kong Kai. The narrator finds out that she and her family have capitalist ties and gives Kai an ultimatum: cut all ties with her and remain in the army or be expelled from the party and await further repercussions. He agrees to the former and drafts a succinct letter saying they cannot be together and an orderly delivers it; they report and An Mali burst out crying. The following morning Kai and An Mali are nowhere to be found; a search beginning for both of them but does not produce any leads. Commander Deng and the narrator take most of the blame, but it causes a rift between them, both feeling that they each have taken too much blame for what happened to Kai.

About a year later, the narrator receives a picture of Kai from the Gansu Province, An Mali, and a baby; he considers what to do with it. Fearing the higher-ups might reconsider his involvement in the case, he spits on the photograph before burning it.

=== "Uncle Piao's Birthday Dinners" ===
Uncle Piao, a Chaoxianzu living in Guanman Village with his wife and daughter Shunji, celebrates his sixtieth birthday by inviting Squad leader Han Feng, Hsiao Bing, Jia Min, Jin Hsin, and Fan Hsiong for a birthday lunch. The Squad leader tells Uncle Piao that accepting any food from him violates Chairman Mao's rule about "taking" from the people. Furious, Uncle Piao throws his food out in the December snow. That evening, Commander Meng Yun apologizes to Uncle Piao for his underlings' misbehavior and says that they will celebrate his birthday with a party two days from now. The Commander then tells his men to never refuse any form of kindness from a Korean ever again. On the day of the party, Uncle Piao tells story about his run-ins with the Japanese and the Russian soldiers; he tells of eyewitness accounts the atrocities committed by the Russians, including rape and murder. After everyone agrees that the Russians are "beasts," Shunji sings in the house as Uncle Piao's and Squad Leader Han's laughter echoes in the house.

=== "Love in the Air" ===
During his work as telegrapher at the Regional Headquarters, Kang Wandou receives a phone call from a Military Region Station in Shenyang asking if he received a certain message; he says yes, and notices that it is a woman's voice on the other end. Though he knows nothing about her, he grows infatuated with her, clinging to her "golden finger" as his lasting memory of her as they exchange messages through code. He eventually decides to tell his colleagues Shi Wei and Shun Min that the "golden finger" is a woman. Shortly thereafter, Shi Wei is reprimanded by Chief Jiang for sending love messages to the Wang Lili, the "golden finger"; a week later he is expelled from the army. The staff of headquarters decide to throw Shi a farewell party where they all buy him presents. Kang gifts him with romantic pillows because Kang thinks that Shi will marry Lili; most of the others laugh at this revelation. He then goes outside and observes the other men at headquarters working. He sees men working in line construction, and decides that evening to put in a request to be transferred to that division; he is no able to work as a telegrapher because it reminds him too much of his quixotic, lovelorn thoughts of Lili.

=== "Dragon Head" ===
Battalion Commander Gao recounts his experiences with Company commander Long Yun, dubbed Dragon Head, in a base in Hutou. Although the relationship between Dragon Head and the other leaders gets off to a rocky start, they find a way to compromise, as Dragon Head is a leader of the local village. As time goes on Dragon Head and the rest of the batteries become friendlier to each other; they share their knowledge each other. As the years go on, Dragon Head adopts a more bandit-like manner and is eventually charged as a criminal and is sentenced to be executed. Seven years later, Commander Gao, now retired from active duty, reads a letter from his underling recounted an interesting story about Dragon Head and how he should have died in the field of battle.

=== "A Contract" ===
Gu Gong bullies new soldiers into doing menial tasks for himself; tradition usually allows experienced soldiers to ask for small favors from the new recruits but Gu goes too far. One day, Gu asks Feng Dong to take out the water with which he washed his feet and Feng refuses; Squad Leader Cheng Zhi then disciplines Gu by pulling him out of his bed and kicking him in the jaw. A few days later, Gu changes Cheng to a fight to save his honor, which Cheng at first refuses, as it does not align with party ideals. Cheng returns ten minutes later and writes out a contract saying that he and Gu are to fight to the death with bayonets with the injured or slain bearing all the responsibility; he takes a bayonet and heads out, awaiting Gu. Shortly thereafter, Vice Squad Leader Liu informs Cheng that Gu has "buried his head in his quilt." Though Cheng believes he will be reprimanded for his behavior, he is instead promoted a few days later.

=== "Miss Jee" ===
Jee Jun, a passionate nineteen-year-old recruit, is often bullied by his fellow trainees for looking and sounding feeble and somewhat feminine; he is nicknamed "Miss Jee" by most of his squad mates. Further, his comrades often try to belittle him and even compose couplets about his blunders during recreation, dinner, and training; despite this, he remains determined to complete his training. Although he does not show outstanding physical ability, he is able to make up for it in vigor and in his aptness for the Russian language. On the day before they complete their training and move to their respective new units, Jee challenges several of his squad mates to drinking and eating contests; this causes him to "bust" his stomach. He is taken to the infirmary and is treated. Despite his "courage," the last couplet the squad composes before going their separate ways is "Miss Jee, drinking like a whale, / Still can't prove she is a male."

=== "A Lecture" ===
Secretary Si Ma Lin and Company Commander Pei Ding agree to invite Liu Baoming to lecture their men about the Long March. To the surprise of both men, his account does not present a heroic tone; instead, he narrates much of the hardships of the march, including the time he was struck in the head with huge pieces of hail, feuds they had with Tibetans, and the day he lost his rifle. However, all pale to the incident where his superiors roasted a man alive and offered his meat to Liu; he refused to cannibalize the man. After he finishes the lecture, Si Ma realizes that he will have to report this incident to his superior before Pei does.

=== "The Russian Prisoner" ===
In Longmen City in Northeast China, a company of men treat Russian soldier Lev Petrovich lavishly while he is their prisoner, hoping to extract information from him. Lev soon learns the way of the company, learning their sport and recreation activities as well as their games, such as Chinese chess and poker; he also has his personal interpreter, Mr. Zhang. He is, however, a little spoiled when it comes to food, which causes Mr. Zhang to reprimand him when he is caught wasting food. When Mr. Zhang dies from illness, a new interpreter is assigned to Lev, Jiao. The company starts to take Jiao's inexperience for granted, relaxing up on their security duties. One night when most of the men are at the movies, they are called outside and learn that Lev has escaped; this causes the company to go on a manhunt. Exhausted, they are forced to searching through the night. Lev, unable to live on crops due to his appetite being acquainted with a chef's cuisine, seeks the help of a family in the field. The parents of the house welcome him as a guest while their daughter runs to inform the company; Lev is arrested after he finishes eating. Two months later, the company learns that Lev was traded to the Russians in exchange for a Chinese defector.

=== "The Fellow Townsmen" ===
Chu Tian and his ill son come to Chen Jun asking for help. Chen is reluctant as he has bad blood with Chu, but helps him as he does not want to lose face with his men. Chu and Chen are both doctors and Chu was once engaged to Chen's sister but broke it off when his status improved and he moved to Beijing; this brought much shame to Chen and his family. Years later, Chu reprimands senior officers for sexual harassment; soon after, he is deemed a counter-revolutionists as revenge and is now on the run with his son. Chen and his men treat Chu and his son to dinner that night. While the father and son sleep, Chen thinks about turning in Chu, but in the morning decides against it as he think Chu's son might be put in his care once Chu is arrested and imprisoned. He instead gives Chu and his son medicine and money before they plan to leave and they kowtow to him.

=== "My Best Soldier" ===
Liu Fu is caught spending the night with a prostitute dubbed the "Little White Fairy"; it turns out that he has visited her six times. His superior Wang Hu reprimands him for his behavior, forcing him to either write a self-criticism or leave the army; he chooses to do the former to keep his "honor." Before the incident, Liu Fu was praised for his combat ability and perseverance; fellow soldiers even wrote poetry praising his leadership. Wang Hu even considered him "his best soldier" and saw a bright future for him. Months go by and no punishment is issued to Liu Fu.

One night while checking the sentries, Wang Hu catches Liu Fu committing bestiality with a mule. Appalled, he beats Liu Fu into submission. In the morning, he talks with Li Yaoping, Liu Fu's squad leader, about the incident. Li admits that this is at least Liu Fu second time committing bestiality; Li had shown him leniency a few weeks before when he caught him because of Liu Fu excellence before the prostitute incident. The two are interrupted by a soldier telling them that Liu Fu is trying to escape to Russian territory; they go after him. Before he can be picked up by a Russian jeep, he is gun-downed via sniper by Wang Hu.

=== "Ocean of Words" ===
Zhou Wen is a bookworm in the army, which causes ire for Secretary Si Ma Lin, his superior; some time ago, Zhou refused to sell Ocean of Words (a massive dictionary that is also a family heirloom) to Si Ma. While Zhou is outside reading one day, Director Liang asks what he is doing reading outside; he says it is too noisy inside to read. Liang subsequently invites Zhou to his house, where he lets him read in a quiet room. Shortly after, Liang tells Zhou why he respects people who can read: he lost his arm and sixty men fighting Chiang Kai-shek many years ago because he could not read a retreat order. Zhou repays Liang by helping him interpret The Communist Manifesto; he also tutors Liang's son in literature.

Shortly before he is to be discharged, Zhou reluctantly asks Liang to help him acquire Party membership, as Si Ma will not recommend him. Liang makes a call to Si Ma and reprimands him for his obstinate behavior; a few days later, he easily receives his membership without hearing any complaints from Si Ma. On his final day in the army, Zhou visits Liang; Zhou receives a Hero pen as a parting gift. Feeling the need to repay Liang once again, he offers his Ocean of Words. Liang at first refuses knowing the significance of the dictionary to Zhou, but ultimately accepts it and says that he will put it to good use. They say goodbye before going their separate ways; Zhou becomes a man of letters and writes for the rest of his life.
