= The Banished Immortal =

2019 biography by Ha Jin

The Banished Immortal: A Life of Li Bai
- Author: Ha Jin
- Subject: Li Bai
- Publisher: Pantheon
- Publication date: 2019

The Banished Immortal: A Life of Li Bai is a biography of Li Bai by Ha Jin that was published in 2019 by Pantheon.

The author wrote his own translations of the poems, as well explanations of the meanings of Li Bai's poems.

== Reception ==
Publishers Weekly stated that it was a "polished biography" that would allow audiences to learn more about Li Bai.

Kirkus Reviews stated that the book had "little of the vigor of his subject." Kirkus praised the translations but not the explanations, stating that they were not profound.
