= Geoffrey Becker =

American writer

Geoffrey Becker is an American short story writer, and novelist.

== Early life and education ==
Geoffrey Becker graduated from Colby College in 1980.

== Career ==
Becker teaches at Towson University.

=== Writing ===
His work appeared in Antioch Review, Colorado Review, Crazyhorse, Crescent Review, failbetter.com, Florida Review, Gettysburg Review, Kansas Quarterly, North American Review, Ploughshares, Prairie Schooner, Quarterly West, Roanoke Review, Sonora Review, The Cincinnati Review, West Branch.

== Awards ==
- National Endowment of the Arts fellowship
- 1989: Nelson Algren Award, for Bluestown
- 1995 Drue Heinz Literature Prize for Dangerous Men
- 2000: "Black Elvis" published in The Best American Short Stories 2000
- 2009: Flannery O'Connor Award for Short Fiction, for "Black Elvis"

== Selected works ==
=== Short stories ===
- Dangerous Men. University of Pittsburgh Press. 1995. ISBN 978-0-8229-3899-6.

=== Novels ===
- Bluestown. St. Martins Press. 1996. ISBN 978-0-312-30456-0. "Geoffrey Becker."
- Hot Springs. Tin House Books. 2010. ISBN 978-0-9820539-4-2. Archived from the original on April 21, 2010.

=== Anthologies ===
- John Edgar Wideman, ed. (2003). 20: Drue Heinz Prize Anthology. University of Pittsburgh Press. ISBN 978-0-8229-5815-4.
- "Black Elvis", included in The Best American Short Stories (Houghton Mifflin, 2000)
- Janice Eidus; John Kastan, eds. (1998). "Bluestown". It's Only Rock and Roll. Godine. p. 268. ISBN 978-1-56792-089-5. "Geoffrey Becker."
- Dennis Trudell, ed. (1996). "El Diablo de la Cienega". Full Court. Breakaway Books. ISBN 978-1-891369-12-4.
