= War Trash =

2004 novel by Ha Jin

- First edition cover
- Author: Ha Jin
- Language: English
- Genre: War novel
- Publisher: Pantheon Books
- Publication date: 2004
- Publication place: United States
- Media type: Print (Hardcover)
- Pages: 352 pp
- ISBN: 0-375-42276-5
- OCLC: 54529825
- Dewey Decimal: 813/.54 22
- LC Class: PS3560.I6 W37 2004

War Trash is a novel by the Chinese author Ha Jin, who has long lived in the United States and who writes in English. It takes the form of a memoir written by the fictional character Yu Yuan, a man who eventually becomes a soldier in the Chinese People's Volunteer Army and who is sent to Korea to fight on the Communist side in the Korean War. The majority of the "memoir" is devoted to describing this experience, especially after Yu Yuan is captured by United Nations forces and imprisoned as a POW. The novel captured the PEN/Faulkner Award and was a finalist for the Pulitzer Prize.

== Plot summary ==
Yu Yuan was originally a cadet at Huangpu Military Academy, an important part of the Kuomintang military system. However, when the Communists gained the upper hand in China, the academy went over to their side, and Yu was made a part of the PLA. He is eventually sent to Korea as a lower-ranking officer in the 180th Division. Since he knew some English, he is made part of his unit's staff as a possible translator. He left behind his mother and his fiancee, a girl named Tao Julan.

Yu Yuan's unit eventually crosses into Korea and engages the South Korean and UN forces there. After the unit is encircled and destroyed, Yu Yuan is injured and is captured. He spends some time in a hospital, where the ministrations of the medical staff impress him with the humane nature of the medical profession.

Subsequently, Yu Yuan is put in a prisoner of war camp. A major political fault line ran through the Communist prisoners, both historically and in the novel. On one side are those who are "loyal" and wish to be repatriated to the Communist side, either North Korean or Chinese; these are called "pro-Communists". On the other side are those who wish to be released to the "Free World", whether that be South Korea or the remaining Chinese Kuomintang bastion of Taiwan. This group is called "pro-Nationalists". Violence often flares between these two groups, and the chief tension in the book is the narrator's attempts to navigate this political minefield.

=== Prisoner with the Nationalists ===
After his capture, Yu is registered as a POW in the city of Pusan. He assumes a false identity to hide his rank as a low-level officer. All captured officers give their names and try to mix in with enlisted men so that they will not be subject to questioning and torture by the captors. He is then taken to the island of Geoje, which was cleared of most civilians to house POWs captured by the South Korean military.

Yu initially finds himself in the pro-Nationalist camp, somewhat against his will. This is not because he is politically passionate, but because his main goal is to return home to his mother and fiancee. Going to Taiwan would politically taint him in communist China and make such a return impossible. His association with Huangpu lends him some breathing room, but when he states his intention to return to mainland China, he is kidnapped by the Nationalists and tattooed with the words "FUCK COMMUNISM" in English.

A decision is made by the administrators of the camp to conduct a "screening" to divide the Nationalists and Communists in the camp and hopefully reduce violence. This period before the screening is an intense time for the camp, as the leadership of both sides wants to convince the prisoners to choose the correct side, thus scoring a propaganda victory. Yu witnesses horrendous torture and coercion committed by pro-Nationalist officers, but motivated by a longing for home, he chooses the Communist side.

=== Working for the Communists ===
Now in a Communist camp, Yu is suspected for his Huangpu ties and his stint with the Nationalists. However, his skills in English are useful and he eventually gains the trust of his superiors. The coordination of the camp is much better than before, and the prisoners organize themselves for resistance. However, they cannot compete with the camp of the North Koreans, who due to their greater knowledge of the area and better underground networks, can carry out stunning logistical feats and are in communication with their capital Pyongyang.

Eventually, the North Koreans organize an attempt to kidnap Gen. Bell, the commandant of all the POW camps. (This is a reference to the historical attempt to capture the American General Francis T. Dodd). They enlist the participation of the Chinese camp through a meeting of emissaries. As a mark of Yu's trustworthiness, Commissar Pei, the leader of the Chinese pro-Communist camp, sends Yu as his representative. The Chinese camp gathers information and passes it to the North Korean camp, which subsequently lures Bell in for negotiations then kidnaps him, a propaganda coup for the Communists.

Soon, the prisoners are sent to better organized camps on Cheju Island. The facilities are better, but the methods of prisoner control are also enhanced, making it harder to resist. Commissar Pei, for instance, is separated from the men. Also, the prisoners begin to feel very isolated from their country, and worry that they will be treated with suspicion after returning to China, as it can be considered treason to be captured rather than fight to the death. However, with ingenious methods of communication developed, Pei sends orders to raise homemade Chinese communist flags on national day, a provocation which creates a confrontation and raises morale, though lives are lost in the ensuing battle.

=== To the Nationalists, and back again ===
At some point a small group of pro-Communist officers—including Commissar Pei's right-hand man, Party member Chang Ming—is ordered to Korea to "re-register". Fearing that this will permanently strip him of his English-speaking lieutenant, Pei orders Yu Yuan to assume Ming's identity and go in his place. Fuming at being sacrificed like a pawn for a man no different from him except for Party membership, Yuan obeys and is sent to Korea. It turns out that "re-registering" is not something sinister, but rather bureaucratic processing. However, the subterfuge of "Ming" is discovered and in the confusion he declares his dislike of the Communists. As a result, he is now sent to the Nationalist camp back of Koje Island.

Back with the Nationalists again, Yuan is subject to another round of suspicion for siding with the Communists earlier. He weathers this (due in part to his tattoo, which he has kept after having it cleared with the Communists). The officers on the Nationalist side hope that his credentials will elevate him once they get to Taiwan, and in this position he might be able to help them. During this time, the armistice is signed by the UN and North Koreans, and the prisoners begin to look forward, with hope and anxiety, towards their repatriation.

Required yet again to declare his allegiance, Yu Yuan, as always, is in a delicate situation. His time on the Communist side means he will always be politically damaged goods in Taiwan, forever handicapped. On the other hand, unless Pei and Ming are still alive and in the good graces of the Party—and therefore able to explain that the Party ordered him to be re-registered—his "defection" to the Nationalists (as well as the lingering taint of being a prisoner in the first place) could be politically devastating if he returns home. He hears that there may be a third option, to emigrate to a neutral country. Quietly, he makes this his plan.

However, when Yu Yuan first enters the tent where declarations must be made, he finds that one of the Communist Chinese observers is a friend of his who instantly recognizes him! No longer anonymous, he realizes that if he chooses a third country, his disloyal choice will be traced to his family and they will suffer. Encouraged by his friend about the treatment prisoners receive in China, he makes the decision to return home on the spot.

=== Bittersweet return to China ===
Yu's homecoming is not what he had hoped for in the more than two years he has been away. His superiors stand up for him, witnessing to the pro-Communist acts he had carried out. But as party members, they are severely tainted (party members swore an oath to fight to the death, and thus their capture is even more dishonorable) and their evidence is worthless. Yu finds out that his mother has died, and Julan has deserted him as a disgrace. Forever marked by his disloyalty, he is unable to use his college education well, and quietly becomes a teacher.

In the epilogue-like final chapter, Yu describes his marriage and children. He is not so tainted that he cannot get his offspring into college, and eventually his son goes to the United States for education. Yu gets his tattoo changed to FUCK...U...S by erasing some of the letters of COMMUNISM. An old man, he learns of the ruin of his communist superiors and the success of some of his Nationalist acquaintances in Taiwan. Eventually, he visits his son in America, giving opportunity for one last comical difficulty with his tattoo, again highly inappropriate. It is here that he finds the time to write the memoir, dedicated to his American grandchildren, which the reader has been enjoying.

== Reception ==
Mark Shechner, of The Buffalo News, thought that while the book may have been "short on the pleasures of subjectivity that we require of fiction [...] as history it [was] both terrifying and absorbing." In a review in The Guardian, Julia Lovell found that while the author's "dark, brutish subject matter" was "fascinating" his "linguistic act" was not "not nearly perfect enough" to justify the glowing reviews the book was getting in America.
