= Eugene Goodheart =

American literary scholar (1931–2020)

- Born: June 26, 1931; Brooklyn, New York, United States
- Died: April 9, 2020 (aged 88); Watertown, Massachusetts, United States
- Education: Columbia University (BA, PhD); University of Virginia (MA)
- Occupations: Literary critic, professor
- Employer: Brandeis University
- Known for: Literary criticism
- Awards: Guggenheim Fellowship (1970)

Eugene Goodheart (June 26, 1931 – April 9, 2020) was an American literary scholar. He was Edytha Macy Gross Professor of Humanities at Brandeis University from 1983 to 2001.

== Biography ==
Goodheart was born on June 26, 1931, in Brooklyn. He received his B.A. from Columbia College, M.A. from the University of Virginia, and Ph.D. from Columbia University in English and Comparative Literature in 1953. At Columbia, Goodheart studied under Lionel Trilling.

Goodheart served on the faculty of Bard College, University Chicago, Mount Holyoke College, Massachusetts Institute of Technology, and Boston University, where he was the chairman of the English department.

He joined the Brandeis faculty in 1983 as Edytha Macy Gross Professor of Humanities and served as the chair of its English department. He also directed the Brandeis Center for the Humanities. He authored a number of books on literary theory and criticism as well as political and social commentary. Among his students at Brandeis University was Chinese American writer Ha Jin.

Goodheart received a Guggenheim Fellowship in 1970 in literary criticism. He was also a National Humanities Center fellow in 1987–1988. He received an honorary doctorate from the City University of New York in 2014, for his “brilliant and provocative contributions to humanist criticism and scholarship.”

== Personal life and family ==
Goodheart died on April 9, 2020, at his home in Watertown, Massachusetts. He was a close friend of Saul Bellow, who also taught at Bard College. According to biographer Zachary Leader, Bellow asked Goodheart on his deathbed, "Was I a man or was I a jerk?" To which Goodheart replied, "You were a good man."

He was married to Wellesley College anthropologist Joan Bamberger until his death.
