= Phyllis Alesia Perry =

American journalist (born 1961)

- Born: 1961 (age 64–65); Atlanta, Georgia, U.S.
- Education: University of Alabama
- Occupations: Journalist; author

Phyllis Alesia Perry (born 1961, in Atlanta, Georgia) is an African-American journalist and author, who lives in the Southern United States.

Phyllis Alesia Perry is the daughter of Harmon Griggs Perry, the first African-American reporter to be hired by the Atlanta Journal. She grew up in Tuskegee, Alabama, and graduated with a degree in communications from the University of Alabama in 1982. Becoming a journalist, she was among a group of Alabama Journal reporters who won the Pulitzer Prize for investigating Alabama's high infant mortality rate.

Perry's debut novel, Stigmata (1998), follows the journey of a young woman, Lizzie, pursuing the story behind a handmade quilt she has inherited on the death of her grandmother. A Sunday in June (2004) is a prequel to Stigmata.

== Works ==
- Stigmata, Hyperion, 1998
- A Sunday in June, Hyperion, 2004
