= The Saboteur (2010 video game) =

- Developer(s): Hands-On Mobile
- Publisher(s): Hands-On Mobile
- Platform(s): iOS, BlackBerry
- Release: January 21, 2010 (BlackBerry); March 24, 2010 (iOS)
- Genre(s): Action-adventure
- Mode(s): Single-player

The Saboteur is an action-adventure video game meant as a mobile tie-in with the console and PC game of the same name released the previous year. It was developed and published by Hands-On Mobile and released on January 21, 2010, for BlackBerry and March 24, 2010, for iOS. The game follows Irishman Sean Devlin as he fights Nazis as part of the French Resistance. The game received negative reviews from critics, who cited its gameplay and controls as weak points.

== Gameplay ==
The game takes place from an isometric perspective. The player controls Devlin with a virtual D-pad as they travel through the levels. The player can sneak up and kill enemies at knifepoint or shoot them with guns that are automatically aimed at the nearest enemy, as well as set bombs.

== Reception ==
Reception

Review scores
Publication	Score
IGN	5/10
Pocket Gamer	2/5

The game received a 43/100 on Metacritic, indicating "generally unfavorable reviews".

Levi Buchanan of IGN rated the game 5/10 points, calling it "sabotaged by bad controls and level layouts that will have you playing the same stages over and over."

Chris Dow of Pocket Gamer rated the game 2/5 stars, calling it "a decidedly late cash-in" on the previous title and saying that it had "over-sized" sprites and stuttering motion that rendered the controls "clunky". He stated that there was "little reason" to return to the game after beating it, and that players would likely regret even playing it.

Steven Hopper of GameZone called the game a "missed opportunity", saying that it did little to bring the excitement of the original game to mobile platforms. He also said that he was disappointed the game did not incorporate the black-and-white stylistic art direction of the original, instead opting for full color.
