= The Best American Short Stories 2006 =

- Editor: Ann Patchett and Katrina Kenison
- Language: English
- Series: The Best American Short Stories
- Media type: Print (hardback & paperback)
- Preceded by: The Best American Short Stories 2005
- Followed by: The Best American Short Stories 2007

The Best American Short Stories 2006, a volume in The Best American Short Stories series, was edited by Katrina Kenison and by guest editor Ann Patchett. This edition is notable in that it was the last edition edited by Katrina Kenison, who was succeeded by Heidi Pitlor the following year. Also, Patchett chose to present the stories in reverse-alphabetical order.

== Stories included (in order of table of contents) ==
Author	Story	Where story previously appeared
Paul Yoon	"Once the Shore"	One Story
Tobias Wolff	"Awaiting Orders"	The New Yorker
Donna Tartt	"The Ambush"	Tin House
Maxine Swann	"Secret"	Ploughshares
Mark Slouka	"Dominion"	TriQuarterly
Patrick Ryan	"So Much for Artemis"	One Story
Benjamin Percy	"Refresh, Refresh"	The Paris Review
Edith Pearlman	"Self-Reliance"	Lake Effect
Alice Munro	"The View from Castle Rock"	The New Yorker
Kevin Moffett	"Tattooizm"	Tin House
Thomas McGuane	"Cowboy"	The New Yorker
Jack Livings	"The Dog"	The Paris Review
Yiyun Li	"After a Life"	Zoetrope
Aleksandar Hemon	"The Conductor"	The New Yorker
Mary Gaitskill	"Today I'm Yours"	Zoetrope
Nathan Englander	"How We Avenged the Blums"	The Atlantic Monthly
Robert Coover	"Grandmother's Nose"	Daedalus
David Bezmozgis	"A New Gravestone for an Old Grave"	Zoetrope
Katherine Bell	"The Casual Car Pool"	Ploughshares
Ann Beattie with Harry Mathews	"Mr. Nobody at All"	Timothy McSweeney's Quarterly Concern

== Other notable stories ==
Included in the "100 Other Distinguished Stories of 2006" were stories by noted authors like John Updike, Uwem Akpan, Alice Hoffman, Lorrie Moore, Joyce Carol Oates, Jeffrey Eugenides, Donald Barthelme, Chris Adrian and Judy Budnitz.
