= The Best American Short Stories 2007 =

Short story collection

- Editor: Stephen King and Heidi Pitlor
- Language: English
- Series: The Best American Short Stories
- Media type: Print (hardback & paperback)
- Preceded by: The Best American Short Stories 2006
- Followed by: The Best American Short Stories 2008

The Best American Short Stories 2007, a volume in The Best American Short Stories series, was edited by Heidi Pitlor and by guest editor Stephen King.

== Short stories included ==
Author	Story	Where story previously appeared
Louis Auchincloss	"Pa's Darling"	Yale Review
John Barth	"Toga Party"	Fiction
Ann Beattie	"Solid Wood"	Boulevard
T. C. Boyle	"Balto"	Paris Review
Randy DeVita	"Riding the Doghouse"	West Branch
Joseph Epstein	"My Brother Eli"	Hudson Review
William Gay	"Where Will You Go When Your Skin Cannot Contain You"	Tin House
Mary Gordon	"Eleanor's Music"	Ploughshares
Lauren Groff	"L. DeBard and Aliette: A Love Story"	The Atlantic Monthly
Beverly Jensen	"Wake"	New England Review
Roy Kesey	"Wait"	Kenyon Review
Stellar Kim	"Findings & Impressions"	Iowa Review
Aryn Kyle	"Allegiance"	Ploughshares
Bruce McAllister	"The Boy in Zaquitos"	Fantasy and Science Fiction
Alice Munro	"Dimension"	The New Yorker
Eileen Pollack	"The Bris"	Subtropics
Karen Russell	"St. Lucy's Home for Girls Raised by Wolves"	Granta
Richard Russo	"Horseman"	The Atlantic Monthly
Jim Shepard	"Sans Farine"	Harper's Magazine
Kate Walbert	"Do Something"	Ploughshares

== Other notable stories ==
Stephen King also selected "100 Other Distinguished Stories of 2006." These included short stories by many well-known writers including Francine Prose's "An Open Letter to Doctor X" from Virginia Quarterly Review, Jhumpa Lahiri's "Once in a Lifetime" from The New Yorker, Lorrie Moore's "Paper Losses" from The New Yorker and Jacob Appel's "The Butcher's Music" from West Branch, as well as works by up-and-coming fiction writers such as David Kear, Matthew Pitt, Paula Nangle, Alison Clement and Justin Kramon.
