= Beverly Jensen =

American short story writer

Beverly Jensen (1953–2003) was an American short story writer whose stories have appeared posthumously in the country's leading literary journals, in the yearly anthology The Best American Short Stories, the anthology Sisters (Paris Press), and the novel-in-stories, The Sisters from Hardscrabble Bay, published by Viking Press in 2010.

Jensen wrote her stories based on the lives of her mother, Idella, and aunt, Avis, between 1986 and 2003. After her death from pancreatic cancer, her husband Jay Silverman and teacher Jennifer Levin (author of Water Dancer) worked to publish the stories, with help from Katrina Kenison ("The Gift of an Ordinary Day") and Howard Frank Mosher ("Walking to Gatlinburg"). "Wake" appeared in New England Review and was subsequently chosen by Stephen King for The Best American Short Stories 2007. The Sisters from Hardscrabble Bay has been praised by Elizabeth Strout, Stephen King, Richard Russo (NY Times, Aug 1, 2010), and O Magazine (Aug. 2010).
