= Saboteur (short story) =

- Short story by Ha Jin
- Language: English
- Genre: Short story

Publication
- Published in: The Antioch Review (1996), The Best American Short Stories (1997), The Bridegroom (2000)
- Media type: Print
- Publication date: 1996

"Saboteur" is a short story written by Ha Jin. It was first published in The Antioch Review in 1996, selected for 1997 edition of The Best American Short Stories anthology series, and included in the 2000 short story collection The Bridegroom.

== Plot ==
The story is set after the Cultural Revolution when the Communist Party was promulgating the idea that all citizens were equal. Mr. Chiu is a recently married man from Harbin. For his honeymoon, he chooses to go to Muji City, located three hundred miles away. The story opens with Mr. Chiu eating lunch with his bride in the square near Muji Train Station, just as his two-week honeymoon is ending. Mr. Chiu is concerned about his acute hepatitis that he had suffered from three months earlier and is afraid of a relapse. A policeman throws tea in the direction of Chiu and his wife while they eat. Their feet get wet, an altercation begins, and Mr. Chiu is unjustly arrested. He asks his wife to catch their train and have someone get him if he does not return by tomorrow.

Mr. Chiu is charged with sabotage. The police chief suggests that Chiu should be punished more severely because he is a Communist Party member. Mr. Chiu refuses to acknowledge guilt and proclaims his innocence. While in jail, he asks a guard to provide him with medical attention for fear that his hepatitis has flared up again. He warns them that they will be responsible if anything were to happen to him. The guard does not heed his warnings or his concerns. Mr. Chiu is unfazed by the fleas in the mattress, and is amazed to find that he doesn't miss his wife a lot. He makes up his mind that when he gets out he will write about his experiences and expose the police force.

He remains in jail throughout the entire weekend. On Monday morning, Mr. Chiu spots Fenjin tied to a tree in the backyard of the jail. Mr. Chiu realizes that Fenjin is the rescuer sent by his bride. He is told that Fenjin was subjected to punishment for calling the chief a bad name. In return for the release of Fenjin and himself, Mr. Chiu signs a statement acknowledging his "crime" and promises to never do it again.

When the two men are released, Mr. Chiu and Fenjin eat at several restaurants near the police station, eating no more than two bowls at any of them. Mr. Chiu keeps wishing he could kill all of his punishers. "Within a month, over 800 people contracted acute hepatitis," six died, including two children.

== Characters ==
- Chiu Maguang

Mr. Chiu, as he is referred to, is a thirty-four-year-old Chinese male visiting Muji City, China for his honeymoon. He lives and works in Harbin, China. He is a lecturer at Harbin University and is a Communist Party member.

- Mr. Chiu's Bride

Described as pale with wire glasses, she is a recent college graduate of the fine arts. She is recently married to Mr. Chiu and is just back from their honeymoon. She has never seen an arrest before and so is terrified. She sends Fenjin, a lawyer, to help release Mr. Chiu from jail.

- Chief of Bureau

Described as a "thin, bald man, who looked serene and intelligent". He unjustly imprisons Mr. Chiu and Fenjin. He cares little that Mr. Chiu might expose his "punishments," because he is confident that the public will believe him when he denies Mr. Chiu's claims.

- Fenjin

A recent graduate from Harbin University's Law Department. Two years ago, Fenjin had enrolled in Mr. Chiu's course about Marxist materialism. He comes to the jail at the request of Mr. Chiu's bride to help Mr. Chiu out of jail. He purportedly calls the Chief a "bandit" and is punished for it by being tied to a pine tree at the jail.
