= Ascent (journal) =

American literary magazine

- Discipline: Literary journal
- Language: English
- Edited by: W. Scott Olsen

Publication details
- Publisher: Concordia College (United States)
- Frequency: Continuous

Standard abbreviations
- ISO 4: Ascent

Indexing
- OCLC no.: 255620039

Links
- Journal homepage

Ascent was an American literary magazine that published stories, poems, and essays, many of which were later reprinted in annual anthologies. The journal was based at Concordia College in Moorhead, Minnesota.

The journal was founded in 1975 at the University of Illinois by Daniel Curley. In 1996, essayist and English scholar W. Scott Olsen became the editor-in-chief. The journal moved to an online format in 2010, where it would reach a wider audience for its award-winning authors.

Recent notable contributors include Victoria Anderson, Jacob M. Appel, Karen Brown, Peter Chilson, Leo Damrosch, Philip Heldrich, Michael Martone, Sarah Baker Michalak and Marjorie Stelmach.

== See also ==
- List of literary magazines
