= Ha Jin =

Chinese-American writer

Ha Jin 哈金
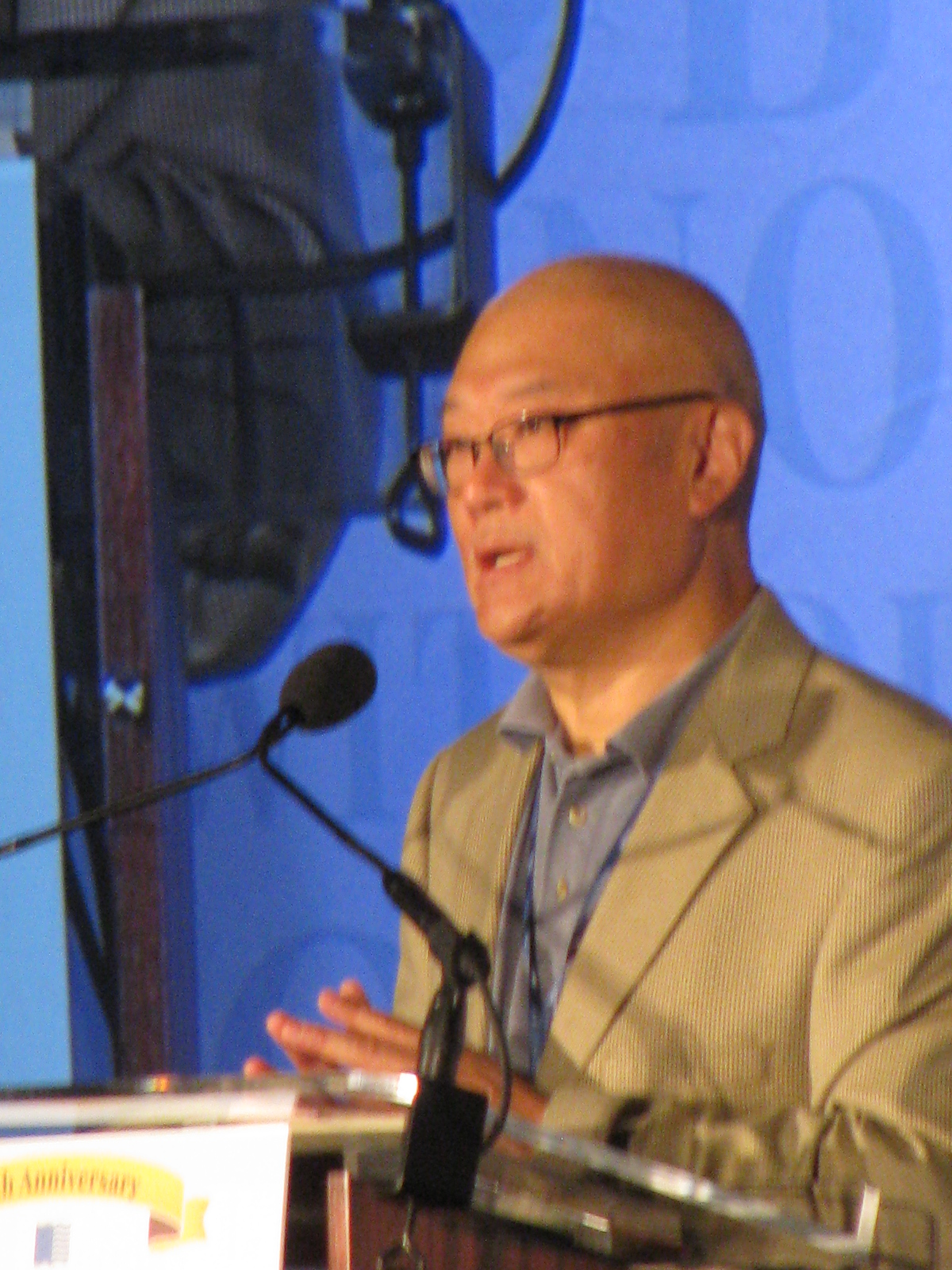
- Born: February 21, 1956 (age 70); Liaoning, China
- Education: Heilongjiang University (BA); Shandong University (MA); Brandeis University (PhD)
- Occupations: Poet; novelist; teacher
- Spouse: Lisha Bian
- Writing career
- Pen name: Ha Jin
- Genres: Poetry, short story, novel, essay
- Subjects: China
- Notable works: List: The Boat Rocker; Waiting; In the Pond; War Trash; Ocean of Words; The Bridegroom
- Notable awards: List: Flannery O'Connor Award for Short Fiction (1996); Hemingway Foundation/PEN Award (1997); Guggenheim Fellowship (1999); National Book Award (1999); PEN/Faulkner Award (2000); Asian Fellowship (2000–2002); Townsend Prize for Fiction (2002); PEN/Faulkner Award (2005); American Academy of Arts and Sciences (2006); Dayton Literary Peace Prize, runner-up, Nanjing Requiem (2012)

Signature
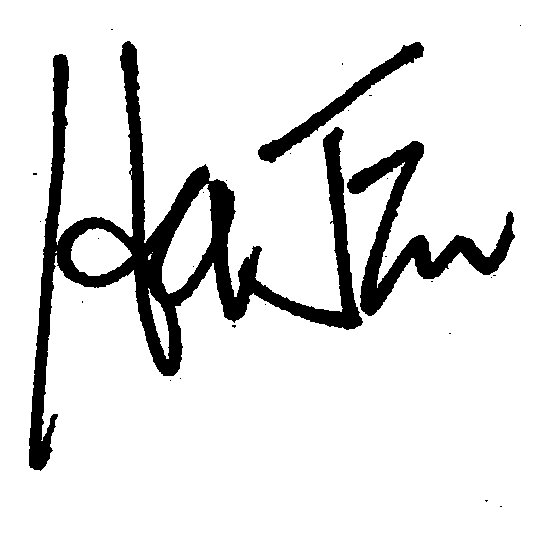

Ha Jin
- Chinese: 哈金
Transcriptions
Standard Mandarin
- Hanyu Pinyin: Hā Jīn

Jin Xuefei
- Simplified Chinese: 金雪飞
- Traditional Chinese: 金雪飛
Transcriptions
Standard Mandarin
- Hanyu Pinyin: Jīn Xuěfēi

Jin Xuefei (simplified Chinese: 金雪飞; traditional Chinese: 金雪飛; pinyin: Jīn Xuěfēi; born February 21, 1956) is a Chinese American poet and novelist who uses the pen name Ha Jin (哈金). The name Ha comes from his favorite city, Harbin. His poetry is associated with the Misty Poetry movement.

== Early life, education, and immigration ==
Ha Jin was born in Liaoning, China. His father was a military officer; at thirteen, Jin joined the People's Liberation Army during the Cultural Revolution. Jin began to educate himself in Chinese literature and high school curriculum at sixteen. He left the army when he was nineteen as he entered Heilongjiang University, later earning a bachelor's degree in English studies. This was followed by a master's degree in Anglo-American literature at Shandong University.

Jin grew up in the chaos of early communist China. He was on a scholarship at Brandeis University when the 1989 Tiananmen Square protests and massacre occurred. The Chinese government's forcible crackdown hastened his decision to emigrate to the United States, and was the cause of his choice to write in English "to preserve the integrity of his work." He eventually obtained a Ph.D. One of his mentors was literary critic Eugene Goodheart.

== Career ==
=== Novels and short writing ===
Jin sets many of his stories and novels in China, in the fictional Muji City. He has won the National Book Award for Fiction and the PEN/Faulkner Award for his novel, Waiting (1999). He has received three Pushcart Prizes for fiction and a Kenyon Review Award. Many of his short stories have appeared in The Best American Short Stories anthologies. His collection Under the Red Flag (1997) won the Flannery O'Connor Award for Short Fiction, while Ocean of Words (1996) has been awarded the PEN/Hemingway Award. The novel War Trash (2004), set during the Korean War, won a second PEN/Faulkner Award for Jin, thus ranking him with Philip Roth, John Edgar Wideman and E. L. Doctorow as the only other authors to have won the prize more than once. War Trash was also a finalist for the Pulitzer Prize for Fiction.

=== Teaching and academic work ===
Jin currently teaches at Boston University in Boston, Massachusetts. He formerly taught at Emory University in Atlanta, Georgia.

Jin was a Mary Ellen von der Heyden Fellow for Fiction at the American Academy in Berlin, Germany, in the fall of 2008. He was inducted to the American Academy of Arts and Letters in 2014.

On July 28, 2021, an asteroid was named after him: (58495) Hajin.

== Awards and honors ==
- Flannery O'Connor Award for Short Fiction (1996)
- PEN/Hemingway Award for Debut Novel (1997)
- Guggenheim Fellowship (1999)
- National Book Award for Fiction (1999)
- PEN/Faulkner Award for Fiction (2000)
- Asian Fellowship (2000–2002)
- Townsend Prize for Fiction (2002)
- PEN/Faulkner Award for Fiction (2005)
- Fellow of American Academy of Arts and Sciences (2006)
- Dayton Literary Peace Prize, runner-up, Nanjing Requiem (2012)
- PEN Oakland/Josephine Miles Literary Award for A Distant Center (2019)

== Books ==
=== Poetry ===
- Between Silences (1990)
- Facing Shadows (1996)
- Ways of Talking (1996)
- Wreckage (2001)
- Missed Time
- The Past
- A Distant Center (2018, Copper Canyon Press)

=== Short story collections ===
- Ocean of Words (1996)
- Under the Red Flag (1997)
- The Bridegroom (2000)
- A Good Fall (2009)

=== Novels ===
- In the Pond (1998)
- Waiting (1999)
- The Crazed (2002)
- War Trash (2004)
- A Free Life (2007)
- Nanjing Requiem (2011)
- A Map of Betrayal (2014)
- The Boat Rocker (2016)
- A Song Everlasting (2021)
- The Woman Back from Moscow: In Pursuit of Beauty (2023)
- "Looking For Tank Man" (2025)

=== Biographies ===
- The Banished Immortal (2019)

=== Essays ===
- The Writer as Migrant (2008)

== See also ==
- Saboteur (short story) (2000)
