= 1959 in poetry =

Nationality words link to articles with information on the nation's poetry or literature (for instance, Irish or France).

== Events ==
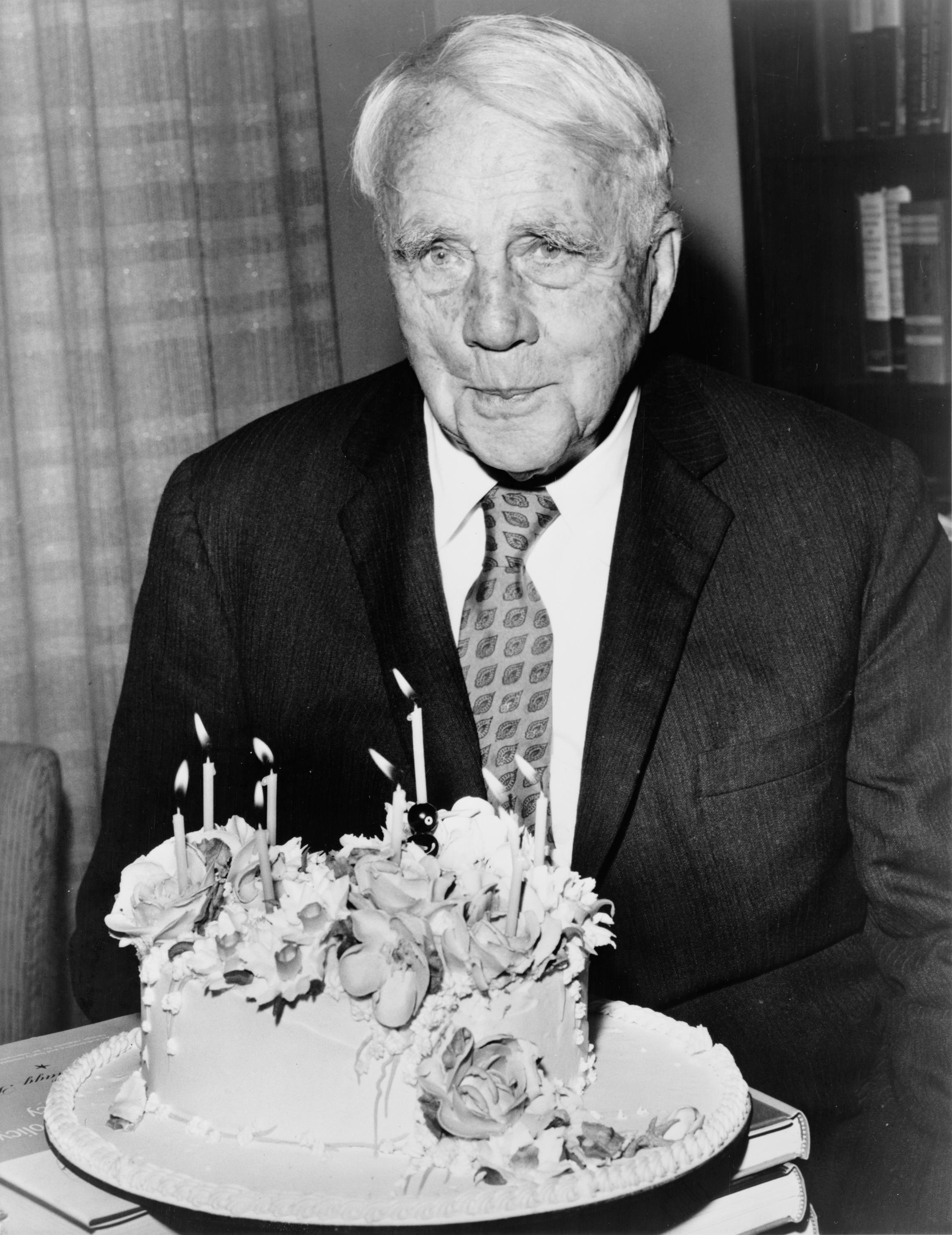
Robert Frost at his 85th birthday party

- March – at a dinner celebrating Robert Frost's 85th birthday, the critic Lionel Trilling gives some brief remarks about Frost's poetry and "permanently changed the way people think about his subject", according to critic Adam Kirsch. Trilling says that Frost had been long viewed as a folksy, unobjectionable poet, "an articulate Bald Eagle" who gave readers comfortable truths in traditional meter and New England dialect in such schoolbook favorites such as "Stopping by Woods on a Snowy Evening" and "The Road Not Taken"; but was instead was "a terrifying poet" not so much like Longfellow as Sophocles, "who made plain ... the terrible things of human life." Trilling is severely criticized at the time, but his view will become widely accepted in the following decades.
- May 18–24 – Nikita Khrushchev, the Soviet Union's head of state, in an extemporaneous speech at the Congress of Soviet Writers, calls for indulgence towards "deviationist" writers. At the same conference, the poet Alexis Surkov again condemns writing "hostile to socialist realism and denounces fellow poet Boris Pasternak as acting in a way that is "treacherous and unworthy of a Soviet writer". A liberalizing trend in the state's treatment of its writers is evident. Surkov, the subject of intense criticism himself, resigns from the congress, and during the year attacks on Pasternak cease.
- November 11 – Release in the United States of the short film Pull My Daisy, written and narrated by Jack Kerouac and starring poets of the Beat Generation Allen Ginsberg, Peter Orlovsky and Gregory Corso.
- December 8 – "The Poetry Society" episode of Hancock's Half Hour is broadcast on BBC radio, satirizing artistic pretensions.
- In the United States, "Those serious new Bohemians, the beatniks, occupied with reading their deliberately undisciplined, protesting verse in night clubs and hotel ballrooms, created more publicity than poetry", writes Harrison M. Hayford, a professor of American Literature at Northwestern University. "Meanwhile back on the campus, the 'square' poets were turning more and more to a controlled verse, much of it good enough to survive the pointed charge of academicism." Non-beat, off-campus poets almost routinely displayed "simple competence in the handling of complex forms", he writes in Encyclopædia Britannica's Britannica Book of the Year 1960, which covers 1959.
- Literary critic M. L. Rosenthal coins the term "confessional" as used in Confessional poetry in "Poetry as Confession", an article appearing in the September 19 issue of The Nation. Rosenthal's article reviews the poetry collection Life Studies by Robert Lowell. The review is later collected in Rosenthal's book of selected essays and reviews, Our Life In Poetry, published in 1991
- The chairmanship of The Group, a grouping of British poets, passes to Edward Lucie-Smith this year when Philip Hobsbaum leaves London to study in Sheffield. The meetings continue at his house in Chelsea, and the circle of poets expands to include Fleur Adcock, Taner Baybars, Edwin Brock, and Zulfikar Ghose; others including Nathaniel Tarn circulate poems for comment.
- Carl Sandburg, poet and historian, lectures at the U.S. fair and exposition in Moscow.
- After twenty years, John Crowe Ransom steps down as editor of The Kenyon Review, which he founded.
- The journal Canadian Literature is founded by George Woodcock at the University of British Columbia.
- The British poetry magazine Agenda is founded by William Cookson and Ezra Pound.
- Aldous Huxley turns down the offer of a knighthood.
- In France, the centenary of the death of Marceline Desbordes-Valmore is commemorated.

== Works published in English ==
Listed by nation where the work was first published and again by the poet's native land, if different; substantially revised works listed separately:

=== Australia ===
- Bruce Dawe, "Enter Without So Much as Knocking"
- Gwen Harwood, "Prize-Giving"
- John Manifold, "On the Boundary"
- Douglas Stewart, "Leopard-Skin"
- Chris Wallace-Crabbe, The Music of Division

=== Canada ===
- Ronald Bates, The Wandering World
- Ralph Gustafson, The Penguin Book of Canadian Verse, anthology
- Robert Finch, Acis in Oxford and Other Poems. Governor General's Award 1961.
- George Johnston, The Cruising Auk
- Irving Layton:
  - A Red Carpet for the Sun,. Governor General's Award 1959.
  - Laughter in the Mind
- Jay Macpherson, *A Dry Light & The Dark Air. Toronto: Hawkshead Press.

=== India, in English ===
- Nissim Ezekiel, The Third ( Poetry in English ), Bombay: Strand Bookshop;
- Keshav Malik, The Lake Surface and Other Poems ( Poetry in English ), New Delhi: Surge Publications
- K. P. Budhey, Chant and Incense, Nagpur: Kusum Budhey
- Prithwindra N. Mukherjee, A Rose-Bud's Song ( Poetry in English ), Pondicherry: Sri Aurobindo Ashram
- P. Lal and K. Raghavendra Rao, editors, Anglo-Indian Poetry, anthology, Delhi: Kavita

=== United Kingdom ===
- Patricia Beer, The Loss of the Magyar, a first book of poems
- Edwin Bronk, An Attempt at Exorcism, Northwood, Middlesex: Scorpion Press
- George Mackay Brown, Loaves and Fishes
- Robert Graves, Collected Poems, the fourth version
- James Harrison, Catchment Area, a first book of poems
- Geoffrey Hill, For the Unfallen: Poems 1952–1958
- P. J. Kavanagh, For the Unfallen
- Laurence Lerner, Domestic Interior, a first book of poems
- Christopher Logue, Songs
- Louis MacNeice, Eighty-Five Poems
- James Michie, Possible Laughter, a first book of poems
- Spike Milligan, Silly Verse for Kids (including "On the Ning Nang Nong")
- I. A. Richards, Goodbye Earth, a first book of poems by a longtime critic
- Anne Ridler, A Matter of Life and Death
- Rex Taylor, Poems, a first book of poems
- Vernon Watkins, Cypress and Acacia

==== Anthologies in the United Kingdom ====
- Edwin Muir, editor, New Poets 1959, an anthology including work by Iain Crichton Smith, Karen Gershon and Christopher Levenson
- Guy Butler, A Book of South African Verse

=== United States ===
- W. H. Auden, Selected Poetry
- Joseph Payne Brennan, The Dark Returners (collects a handful of poems as filler to the short fiction)
- Hayden Carruth, the Crow and the Heart, New York: Macmillan
- Louis O. Coxe, The Wilderness, and Other Poems
- Babette Deutsch, Coming of Age
- Robert Duncan, Selected Poems, San Francisco: City Lights Books
- William Everson (also known as "Brother Antoninus"), The Crooked Lines of God, University of Detroit Press
- John Fandel, Testament, and Other Poems
- Jean Garrigue, A Water Walk by Villa d'Este
- Barbara Gibbs, The Green Chapel
- Allen Ginsberg, Kaddish, written about his mentally-ill mother
- Ramon Guthrie, graffiti, New York: Macmillan
- Donald Hall, Dark Houses
- Edwin Honig, The Gazebos: Forty-One Poems, Clarke & Way
- Barbara Howes, Light and Dark
- Langston Hughes, Selected Poems
- Jack Kerouac, Mexico City Blues
- Kenneth Koch, Ko, or a Season on Earth
- Denise Levertov, With Eyes at the Back of Our Heads, New York: New Directions
- Robert Lowell, Life Studies, a book on his family and on his own life that reflected stylistic changes that seemed more in line with the popular openness of Beat and Confessional poetry
- James Merrill, The Country of a Thousand Years of Peace, and Other Poems
- W. S. Merwin, translation, The Poem of the Cid, London: Dent (American edition, 1962, New York: New American Library)
- Marianne Moore, O to Be a Dragon
- Vladimir Nabokov, Poems
- Ogden Nash, Verses from 1929 On
- Ned O'Gorman, The Night of the Hammer
- Hyam Plutzik, Apples From Shinar
- Ezra Pound, Thrones: 96–109 de los cantares
- Charles Reznikoff, Inscriptions: 1944-1956, self-published
- Theodore Roethke, Words for the Wind
- Delmore Schwartz, Summer Knowledge: New and Selected Poems 1938-1958, Garden City, New York: Doubleday
- Louis Simpson, A Dream of Governors, Middletown, Connecticut: Wesleyan University Press
- W. D. Snodgrass, Heart's Needle
- Gary Snyder, Riprap
- Ruth Stone, In an Iridescent Time, New York, New York: Harcourt, Brace and Company
- May Swenson, A Cage of Spines
- David Wagoner, A Place to Stand
- Reed Whittemore, The Self-Made Man
- Richard Wilbur, Advice to a Prophet and Other Poems, New York: Reynal and Hitchcock
- James Wright, Saint Judas, Middletown, Connecticut: Wesleyan University Press
- Louis Zukofsky, A 1–12, published by Cid Corman's Origin Press

=== Criticism, scholarship and biography in the United States ===
- Richard Ellmann, James Joyce, biography, winner of the National Book Award in 1960
- Hugh Kenner (Canadian writing and published in the United States):
  - The Art of Poetry, criticism
  - The Invisible Poet: T. S. Eliot (revised edition in 1969), criticism

=== Other in English ===
- Frank Collymore, Collected Poems, Barbados
- M. K. Joseph, The Living Countries, New Zealand
- E. H. McCormick, New Zealand Literature, a Survey, acholarship, New Zealand

== Works published in other languages ==
Listed by language and often by nation where the work was first published and again by the poet's native land, if different; substantially revised works listed separately:

=== French language ===
==== France ====
- Louis Aragon, Elsa
- Yves Bonnefoy, L'Improbable
- Aimé Césaire, Ferrements, Martinique poet published in France
- Edmond Jabès, Je batis ma demeure, poemès 1943–1957
- Michel Deguy, Meurtrières
- Patrice de La Tour du Pin, Le Second Jeu
- Henri Michaux, Paix dans les brisements, about his experiences taking mescaline
- Saint-John Perse, Chronique, Marseilles: Cahiers du Sud
- Boris Vian, Je voudrais crever

===== Anthologies in France =====
- Roger Caillois and Jean Clarence Lambert, editors, Trésor de la poésie universelle
- Max Pol Fouchet, De L'Amour au voyage, anthologie thématique de la poésie française
- Paul Valéry wrote the preface to the new edition this year of Anthologie des poètes de la N. R. F.

===== Les poèmes de l'année 1959 =====
Alain Bosquet and Pierre Seghers, editors, Les poèmes de l'année 1959, with poems by:

- Pierre Albert-Birot
- Marc Alyn
- Guy d'Areangues
- Anne-Marie de Backer
- Luc Bérimont
- Yves Bonnefoy
- Roland Bouheret
- Pierre Boujut
- Hélène Cadou
- Jean Cassou
- René Char
- Paul Chaulot
- Malcolm de Chazal
- Andrée Chedid
- Georges-Emmanuel Clancier
- Jean Cocteau
- Gabriel Cousin
- Yanette Delétang-Tardif
- Lucienne Desnoues
- Gabriel Dheur
- Charles Dobzynski
- Marie-Jeanne Durry
- Louis Émié
- Pierre Emmanuel
- Jean Follain
- André Frénaud
- Jacqueline Frédéric Frié
- Pierre Garnier
- Gherasim Luca
- Paul Gilson
- Robert Goffin
- Jean Grosjean
- Guillevic
- Georges Haldas
- Anne Hébert
- Alain Jouffroy
- Pierre Jean Jouve
- Hubert Juin
- Anne-Marie Kegels
- Jean-Clarence Lambert
- Léna Leclercq
- Jean Lurçat
- Joyce Mansour
- Pierre Mathias
- Rouben Melik
- Victor Misrahi
- Bernard Noël
- Norge (poet)
- Pierre Oster
- Pericle Patocchi
- Jean-Guy Pilon
- Francis Ponge
- Gérard Prévot
- Jean-Claude Renard
- Jean Rousselot
- Jacques-André Saintonge
- Pierrette Sartin
- Lucien Scheler
- Léopold Sedar Senghor
- Claude Sernet
- Jules Supervielle
- Jean Tardieu
- Tchicaya U Tam'si
- Jean Todrani
- Jean Tortel
- Tristan Tzara
- Angèle Vannier

===== Criticism, scholarship and biography in France =====
- Correspondance de Stéphane Mallarmé (1862–1871)

=== Canada ===
- Maurice Beaulieu, Il fait clair de glaise
- Olivier Marchand, Crier que je vis
- Fernand Ouellet, Séquences de l'Aile

==== Criticism, scholarship and biography in French Canada ====
- Editor not known, La Poésie et nous, a collection of essays on poetry

=== Hebrew ===
==== Israel ====
- L. Ben-Amitai, Ahaliba
- Leah Goldberg, Mukdam Umeuhar ("Early and Late")
- Abraham Halfi, ka-Almonin ba-Geshem ("As the Unknown in the Rain")
- Yeshurun Keshet, Hayim Genuzim ("Hidden Life")
- Shimshon Meltzer, Or Zorua, ("Scattered Light")
- Yonathan Ratush, Zela
- Zalmen Shneur, a 10-volume collection of his poems

==== United States ====
- M. S. Ben-Meir, Zel Utzlil ("Shadow and Sound"), posthumous
- A. S. Schwartz, Shirim ("Poems"), posthumous

=== India ===
Listed in alphabetical order by first name:

- Agyeya (pen name of Sachchidananda Vatsyayan), editor, Teesra Saptak, an anthology of seven poets, including Kunwar Narain), Bhratiya Jnanpith, ISBN 81-263-0822-2; Hindi-language
- Harumal Isardas Sadarangani, Ruba'ivun; Sindhi-language
- M. Gopalakrishna Adiga, Bhumigita; Kannada-language

=== Italian ===
- Maria Luisa Spaziani, Luna lombarda

==== Anthologies in Italy ====
- Editor not known, Nuovi poeti, an anthology of Italian poetry since 1945
- Salvatore Quasimodo, editor, Poesia italiana del dopoguerra, an anthology of Italian poetry since 1945

=== Spanish language ===
==== Latin America ====
- Santos Chocano, Poesía de Santos Chocano
- Rafael Maya, Navegación nocturna
- Pablo Neruda, Estravagario (Chile)
- Octavio Paz, La estación violenta
- Valdelomar, Obra poética

===== Anthologies in Latin America =====
- P. Félix Restrepo, prologue and epilogue, Poemas de Colombia, published by the Colombian Academy, with biographical notes by Carlos López Narváez
- Antonio de Undurraga, editor, Atlas de la poesía de Chile, including poetry from Guillermo Blest Gana and Luis Merino Reyes

===== Criticism, scholarship and biography in Latin America =====
- Raúl Leiva, Imagen de la poesía mexicana contemporánea, concerning 29 poets

==== Spain ====
- Gabriel Celaya, Cantata en Aleixandre, verse variations on themes of Vicente Aleixandre, published as a book by the literary magazine Papeles de sSon Armadans

=== Yiddish ===
- Benjamin J. Bialostotzky, a book of poetry
- M. Daych, a book of poetry
- Ezra Korman, a book of poetry
- H. Leivick, Lider tsum eybikn ("Songs to the Eternal")
- Ephraim Auerbach, a book of poetry
- Jacob Shargel, a book of poetry

=== Other ===
- Mário Cesariny, Nobilíssima Visão (Portugal)
- Odysseus Elytis, To Axion Esti — It Is Worthy (Greece)

== Awards and honors ==
=== Australia ===
- Grace Leven Prize for Poetry: R. D. Fitzgerald, The Wind at Your Door

=== United Kingdom ===
- Queen's Gold Medal for Poetry: Francis Cornford

=== United States ===
- Consultant in Poetry to the Library of Congress (later the post would be called "Poet Laureate Consultant in Poetry to the Library of Congress"): Richard Eberhart appointed this year.
- National Book Award for Poetry: Theodore Roethke, Words for the Wind
- Pulitzer Prize for Poetry: Stanley Kunitz, Selected Poems 1928-1958
- Bollingen Prize: Theodore Roethke
- Fellowship of the Academy of American Poets: Louise Bogan

=== Other ===
- Premio de la Crítica in poetry (Spain): Blas de Otero
- Canada: Governor General's Award, poetry or drama: Red Carpet for the Sun, Irving Layton.

== Births ==
Death years link to the corresponding "[year] in poetry" article:

- June – Robin Llwyd ab Owain, Welsh poet
- June 25 – Barbara Rosiek, Polish writer, poet and clinical psychologist (died 2020)
- July 23 – Carl Phillips, American writer and poet
- October 1 – Brian P. Cleary, American humorist, poet and author
- August 9 – Kim Bridgford, American poet (died 2020)
- September 29 – Jon Fosse, Norwegian fiction writer, playwright and poet
- Also:
  - Dermot Bolger, Irish author, playwright and poet
  - Robert Crawford, Scottish poet and literary scholar
  - Peter Gizzi, American poet
  - Paul Henry, Welsh poet
  - Gwyneth Lewis, Welsh poet
  - Laura Lush, Canadian poet

== Deaths ==
Birth years link to the corresponding "[year] in poetry" article:

- January 3 – Edwin Muir, 72 (born 1887), Scottish poet, novelist and translator
- February 20 – Zalman Shneur, 72, Hebrew-Yiddish poet and author
- February 23 – Luis Palés Matos, Puerto Rican poet, of a heart attack
- April 4 – Sarah Cleghorn, American reformer and poet, 83
- April 8 – Kyoshi Takahama 高浜 虚子, pen name of Kiyoshi Takahama (born 1874), Japanese, Shōwa period poet; close disciple of Masaoka Shiki
- June 2 – Orelia Key Bell, 95, American poet
- June 9 – Ryuko Kawaji 川路柳虹, pen-name of Kawaki Makoto (born 1888), Japanese, Shōwa period poet and literary critic
- June 23 – Boris Vian, 39, French writer, poet, singer and musician
- July 6 – George Grosz (born 1893), German artist and poet, died from falling down a flight of stairs after a night drinking
- August 5 – Edgar Guest, 79, American poet known as the "poet of the people"
- August 21 – Denis Devlin (born 1908) Irish modernist poet and career diplomat
- September 16 – Roger-Arnould Rivière, 29, French poet, suicide
- September 18 – Benjamin Péret, 60, French poet and Surrealist
- September 27 – Herman Wildenvey, 74, Norwegian poet
- December 27 – Alfonso Reyes, 70, Mexican poet and writer

== See also ==
- Poetry
- List of poetry awards
- List of years in poetry
