= Martin Bell (poet) =

English poet

Vincent Martin Oliver Bell (2 February 1918 – 1 February 1978) was an English poet who was a key member of The Group, an informal group of poets who met in London from the mid-1950s to the mid-1960s.

== Biography ==
Bell was born in Hampshire, England. He attended the University of Southampton, then called University College, Southampton, where he read for an external London Honours degree in English, followed in 1939 by a diploma in Education. He served from 1939 to 1946 with the Royal Engineers in Lebanon, Syria and Italy.

From the mid-1950s, Bell became a member of The Group in London, having been introduced by Peter Redgrove following a chance meeting outside Chiswick Library. Bell regularly attended The Group's meetings until leaving for Leeds in 1967, and was influential in its workings. He was later described by Philip Hobsbaum as "much older than the rest of us, and much the best linguist;" and by Peter Porter as "the father and tone-setter of Group discussions." During this time, Bell held various teaching posts through London County Council; and worked as an opera critic for The Queen magazine, a post obtained through his friend Anthony Burgess. He was awarded the first Arts Council Poetry Bursary in 1964, enabling him to work part-time and allowing more time for writing.

Bell succeeded David Wright to the Gregory Fellowship in Poetry at the University of Leeds, having been recommended for the position by Professor Norman Jeffares. At age 49, he was the oldest poet to hold the Fellowship. The outbreak of war in 1939 and Bell's personal circumstances had interrupted his career and his development as a poet; Peter Porter pinpoints his poetic "flowering" as having come to Bell in early middle age, notably between 1955 and 1965. Bell's poems appeared in journals, and a selection of his poetry was included in the Penguin Modern Poets series, alongside poems by George Barker and Charles Causley in 1962. However, Collected Poems, 1937-1966 was the first and only poetry collection to be published during his lifetime.

Like his predecessors, Bell contributed both editorial advice and poems to the student literary magazine Poetry and Audience. In his final editorial as editor of the magazine, Ronnie Sullivan thanked Bell for his advice and for "contacting outside poets;" Peter Porter, Gavin Ewart, and Norman MacCaig were amongst those who appeared in the magazine's cyclostyled pages during Bell's Fellowship. Bell may also have been influential in the production of issues of Poetry and Audience entirely devoted to translations.

As well as being involved in and contributing to student poetry seminars at which he sometimes read his own work, Bell held regular discussion sessions for student poets in the Fenton pub, close to the University. Announcements in Poetry and Audience also show that Bell participated in readings open to the Leeds public, including a reading with fellow "Leeds poets" Geoffrey Hill and William Price Turner at the Civic Institute in February 1968, and a reading with George MacBeth, himself a member of The Group, in December of that year.

During his tenure of the Gregory Fellowship, Bell took up a part-time teaching position at the Leeds College of Art, holding afternoon poetry seminars as part of the college's Complementary Studies programme. Bell's seminars generally involved between five and seven students, who discussed poems "by famous, but ... unfamiliar, writers," and were perhaps influenced by his experience with The Group. The poet George Szirtes was amongst his students. Szirtes later acknowledged the influence that Bell had had on his own poetic development, describing him as "a good and kind teacher" and "very important to me, the first real poet in my life". Bell was instrumental in arranging the publication of Szirtes' first pamphlet of poetry, Poems, issued in 1972 as number 5 in the Perkin Poets series printed by the Stanningley based Perkins Printers.

Bell continued to teach at the College of Art when his Gregory Fellowship came to an end in 1969. He edited and contributed to an anthology of poetry written by staff and students at the college, including Szirtes, Jeff Nuttall and Doug Sandle (the latter a Leeds University graduate and editor/co-editor of student magazines Sixty-One, Ikon and M.O.M.A.). The anthology included three poems by Bell which were later collected in his posthumous Complete Poems (1988): And Welcomes Little Fishes In, Cauchemar and Variations on Francis Bacon. They are grouped together with a poem sequence titled from The City of Dreadful Something, an epithet coined by Bell for Leeds, parodying James Thomson's City of Dreadful Night. Peter Porter refers to this sequence as "a sort of mini-Waste Land." Bell's outlook on the city is dismal and gloomy, with "rain one day, snow the next, and sleet and fog the next day, And wind all the time;" the final section compares Leeds to Hell, which "also includes the Merrion Centre with its special subways for mugging.

In the late 1960s Bell visited Cyprus with his close friend, the Leeds-based Cypriot artist Stass Paraskos, on several occasions, and helped Paraskos establish the Cyprus Summer School for Artists, which later became the Cyprus College of Art. As well as meeting the Cypriot President Archbishop Makarios whilst in Cyprus in 1968, several of Bell's poems inspired by these trips were published in the Cypriot art and letters journal Poseidon.

Martin Bell died in Leeds in 1978. Collections of his literary papers and correspondence are held at the University of Southampton Libraries Special Collections and the Department of Special Collections and University Archives at the McFarlin Library, University of Tulsa. There is also an extensive archive of manuscripts and correspondence held in Special Collections at the University of Leeds. The collection was bequeathed in 2019, following the death of Bell’s former partner Christine McCausland.

In 1997, Martin Bell's Reverdy Translations were published by Whiteknights Press with a foreword by Peter Porter and an introduction by John Pilling.
