= Delta (poetry magazine) =

Delta was a small poetry magazine that was produced at the University of Cambridge in the 1950s and 1960s. The magazine was first published in 1954. The founder was Peter Redgrove. It was originally edited by Peter Redgrove and Rodney Banister, but Redgrove persuaded Philip Hobsbaum to take over from Issue 3. The magazine introduced various poets, including The Group figures Edward Lucie-Smith and Peter Porter. From 1972 the magazine was not edited from Cambridge. It ended publication in 1981.
