= Hélène Cadou =

French poet and writer (1922 – 2014)

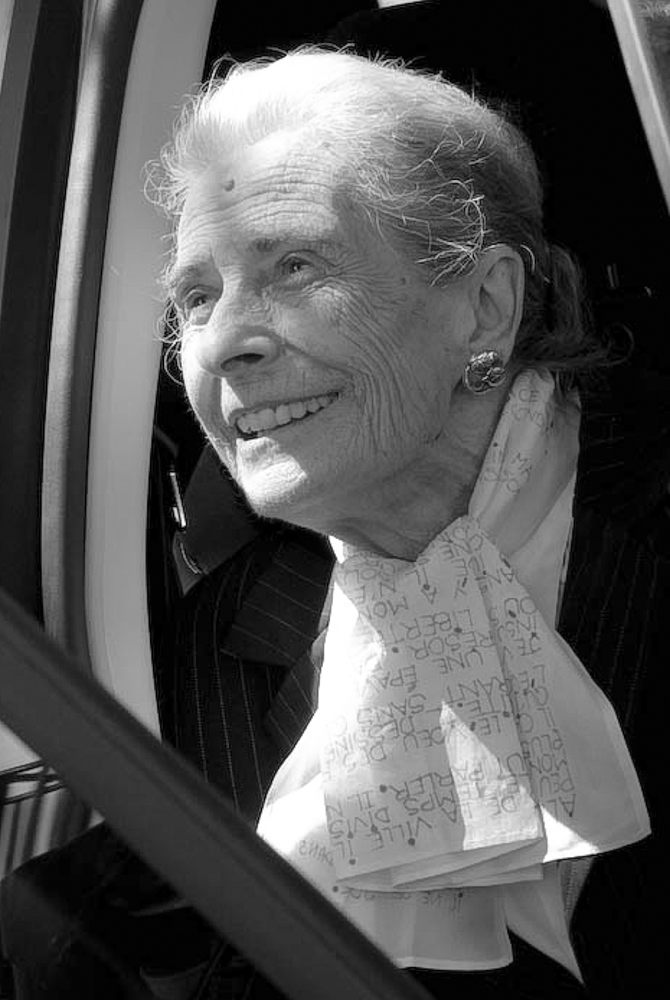
- Born: Hélène Laurent; 4 June 1922; Mesquer, Loire-Atlantique, France
- Died: 20 June 2014 (aged 92); Nantes, France
- Education: Lycée Gabriel Guist'hau
- Occupations: Poet, writer, schoolmaster, librarian
- Writing career
- Language: French

Hélène Cadou (4 June 1922 – 20 June 2014) was a French poet, writer, schoolmaster, and librarian.

== Biography ==
Hélène Cadou was born as Hélène Laurent on 4 June 1922 in Mesquer, Loire-Atlantique, on the Atlantic coast of France. In 1925, her family moved to Pornichet and later to Nantes in 1929. Since her childhood, she showed interest in writing poems. She wrote her first poem when she was 6 years old.

She studied at the Lycée Gabriel Guist'hau and passed her Baccalauréat in 1939. While pursuing her higher education in literature and philosophy, she developed literary correspondence with a number of noted scholars including René Guy Cadou (1920 – 1951), a noted French poet, Jean Boutière (1898 – 1967), a French philologist, Marcel Béalu (1908 – 1993), and Julien Lanoë (1904 – 1983), a French industrialist and man of letters. Lanoë invited her to join a small group of literary figures who were collectively publishing poems and essays under Sillages. She later started writing poems under the pseudonym of Claire Jordanne. In 1946 she married René Guy Cadou, a noted French poet, who was the son of her father's colleague, Georges Cadou. René Guy Cadou was working as a permanent teacher in Louisfert.

After her husband's death in 1951, she left Louisfert to work as a librarian in Orléans until her retirement in 1987. In Orléans, she was welcomed by Roger Secrétain, a friend of René Guy Cadou. During her tenure as a librarian she worked with Georges Bataille and François Hauchecorne who served as curators in succession.

In Orléans, she showed interest in the poetic and artistic life of the time, and was actively engaged in cultural and literary activities. She became the president of the Cultural Action Center of Orléans and Loiret. She was also associated with the Maison de la culture (MCO - Carré Saint-Vincent).

She died in Nantes on 20 June 2014.

== Publications ==
Although she published in the years following her husband's death in 1951, it was only in the late 1970s that her literary works were really discovered and since then she started to publish extensively. She has published more than thirty books. In addition to her own writing, she popularized some of the works of René Guy Cadou, which include

- C'était hier et c'est demain, Éditions du Rocher (2000)
- Une vie entière - René Guy Cadou, la mort, la poésie ( 2003)

== Awards and honours ==
In recognizing her contributions in literature, she was named as the Knight in the Order of Merit in (1975) and the Knight of Arts and Letters (1982), and was also honoured with the Verlaine Prize (1990).
