= The Group (literature) =

London poets' informal group

The Group was an informal group of poets who met in London from the mid-1950s to the mid-1960s. As a poetic movement in Great Britain it is often seen as being the successor to The Movement.

== Cambridge ==
In November 1952 while at Downing College, Cambridge University, Philip Hobsbaum along with two friends—Tony Davis and Neil Morris—dissatisfied with the way poetry was read aloud in the university, decided to place a notice in the undergraduate newspaper Varsity for people interested in forming a poetry discussion group. Five others, including Peter Redgrove, came along to the first meeting. This poetry discussion group met once a week during term.

== London ==
When Hobsbaum moved to London, the discussion group reconstituted itself there. It is this London group that is now referred to as The Group.

The London meetings started in 1955 once a week, on Friday evenings, at first at Hobsbaum's flat and later at the house of Edward Lucie-Smith. The poets gathered to discuss each other's work, putting into practice the sort of analysis and objective comment in keeping with the principles of Hobsbaum's Cambridge tutor F. R. Leavis and of the New Criticism in general. Before each meeting about six or seven poems by one poet would be typed, duplicated and distributed to the dozen or so participants.

There was no manifesto as such. Lucie-Smith wrote, in a letter to Hobsbaum dated November 1961: 'This is a group of poets who find it possible to meet and discuss each other's work helpfully and without backbiting or backscratching…we have no axe to grind — this isn't a gang and there's no monolithic body of doctrine to which everyone must subscribe'.

The poets who met included George MacBeth, Edward Lucie-Smith, Philip Hobsbaum, Peter Redgrove, Alan Brownjohn, Peter Porter and Martin Bell. Ted Hughes occasionally attended.

== Lucie-Smith ==
The chairmanship of the group passed to Edward Lucie-Smith in 1959 when Hobsbaum left London to study in Sheffield. The meetings continued at his house in Chelsea, and the circle of poets expanded to include Fleur Adcock, Taner Baybars, Edwin Brock, and Zulfikar Ghose; others including Nathaniel Tarn circulated poems for comment.

Lucie-Smith and Hobsbaum edited A Group Anthology (London: Oxford University Press, 1963); in the foreword the aim is described of writing 'frank autobiographical poems' and a 'poetry of direct experience'. In the anthology's epilogue Hobsbaum writes of the importance of discussion, and the writer's need for 'community to keep him in touch with his audience.'

Satire was prominent in the works of Bell, Brownjohn, and Porter.

== Next stages ==
=== The Belfast Group ===
When Hobsbaum moved to Belfast in 1962 he established a similar group there, sometimes referred to as The Belfast Group.

=== The Poets' Workshop ===
After the publication and publicity associated with the publication of the anthology, numbers attending the weekly meetings increased, and the meetings became unworkable. In 1965 the Group was restructured, and the more formal The Poets' Workshop was established under the influence of Martin Bell.

== Sources ==
- Garfitt, Roger, "The Group", in British Poetry since 1960: A Critical Survey, Michael Schmidt, Grevel Lindop (editors), Carcanet, 1972, ISBN 0-902145-73-8, pages 13–69.
- The Oxford Literary History, Volume 12, 1960 – 2000, The Last of England?, Oxford University Press, 2004
- Ousby, Ian (editor), Cambridge Paperback Guide to Literature in English, Cambridge University Press, 1996
- Hobsbaum, Philip, "The Redgrove Momentum: 1952 – 2003", in The Dark Horse, Summer 2003
