= Language in Modern Literature =

Language in Modern Literature: Innovation and Experiment
- Cover of the first edition
- Author: Jacob Korg
- Language: English
- Subject: Literary criticism
- Publisher: Barnes and Noble Books
- Publication date: 1979
- Publication place: United States
- Media type: Print
- Pages: 244
- ISBN: 978-0855279653

Language in Modern Literature: Innovation and Experiment is a 1979 book by literary scholar Jacob Korg. In the book, Korg examines the role that linguistic experiment played in literary modernism.

== Overview ==
Korg's discussion of the role of linguistic experiment is focused on examinations of the work of T. S. Eliot, Gertrude Stein, Ezra Pound, T. E. Hulme, E. E. Cummings, William Carlos Williams, and James Joyce. His study moves from a discussion of the motives of experimentation in language, to discussion of realism, and on to questions of form and language, abstraction and language, and the use of imagery, parody, borrowing and quotation, and typographical experiments in literature. The book closes with a chapter on Joyce's Finnegans Wake.

== Reception ==
Language in Modern Literature was reviewed widely and received mixed assessments in various academic journals. While most acknowledged that Korg's book was useful, certain reviewers found his analysis too repetitive and simplistic.

Victor Sage, writing in the Journal of Beckett Studies, pointed out that Korg limited his argument to a few writers and critics throughout the book, and this gave the text a repetitive quality. Sage complained about "the deliberate limitation and re-use of material, and went on to note that "a curious, nagging expectation, not to be removed by the most skilful writing, arises in the reader's mind at about the half-way stage, that the same names are going to crop up again and again in new permutations, for Professor Korg has tended to compound his method by using his critics over and over again in a similar fashion to his authors. The book cannot help but be repetitive; and once the major protagonists have been introduced and the paradox expounded, the later chapters ('Form and Language' and Imagery and Other Resources' in particular) are noticeably less satisfactory."

Richard Boyd Hauck praised the book in Modern Fiction Studies: "Korg has organized his book according to various experimental principles: ideas about the techniques for representing reality, problems of the mind, language forms, abstractions, and imagery. Concluding with an essay on Finnegans Wake, he gives us a modernist credo which pulls his book together. Joyce's comic vision mingles 'intelligent perception and humane laughter' to achieve 'vital new relationships' in a world 'where the old ones have gone dead.' Language remains 'as open to renewal as the imagination itself'."

Patricia Ingham, reviewing the book in The Review of English Studies, New Series, found Korg's linguistic analysis was "nebulous" but nonetheless she found value in the book: "He makes a comparison between the use of collage by Braque and Picasso and literary use in the work of William Carlos Williams. He compares abstract painting with the literary attack on meaning. What emerges from the latter account is the impossibility of ever defeating such a guerilla. If the 'revolution' throws up a hero it is surely meaning. Dr. Korg plots his repeated emergence with great perception and skill. These are qualities shown throughout the detailed analysis of individual writers, especially in the section on Joyce, and they offset the nebulousness of the linguistic generalizing."

Roger Fowler in The Journal of English and Germanic Philology found the book's value to be extremely limited. "Although I grant the usefulness of the book at an elementary level, I am bound to question its value at a higher scholarly level. As literary history it is superficial and derivative (the indebtedness to other critics is honestly acknowledged in the text and footnotes). What is more damaging, though, is the weakness of the theoretical and methodological framework for analyzing language."

Fowler concluded:"This is an agreeable book, interesting, useful as a general introduction to modernist writing, well-written itself; but unexciting and limited as a contribution to the advancement of knowledge."

Philip Hobsbaum in The Modern Language Review found the writers Korg chose as his subject matter to be too heterogeneous to be encompassed by the same analysis: "Language in Modern Literature believes modernism to be a definite entity whose elements are offered as enigmas, in which reason gives place to metaphor, where fragmented syntax imitates the chaotic contemporary world. Professor Korg lays astonishing emphasis on Cummings, Stein, Wyndham Lewis, Hulme: yesterday's men of tomorrow. They are now surely of interest only to the cultural sociologist. Korg's other figures, Joyce, Eliot, Pound, and Williams seem diminished in their company: the same rationale cannot do for all."

== See also ==
- Literary modernism
- Experimental literature

== Sources ==
- Fowler, Roger (1981). "Review of Language in Modern Literature: Innovation and Experiment". The Journal of English and Germanic Philology. 80 (3): 457–459. ISSN 0363-6941. JSTOR 27708866.
- Hauck, Richard Boyd (1981). "Review of Criticism in the Wilderness: The Study of Literature Today; Edges of Extremity: Some Problems of Literary Modernism. University of Tulsa Monograph Series, No. 17; Language in Modern Literature: Innovation and Experiment; The Comedy of Language: Studies in Modern Comic Literature". Modern Fiction Studies. 27 (2): 388–391. ISSN 0026-7724. JSTOR 26280713.
- Hobsbaum, Philip (1983). "Review of Language in Modern Literature: Innovation and Experiment; After the New Criticism; Literature against Itself: Literary Ideas in Modern Society; Deconstruction and Criticism". The Modern Language Review. 78 (2): 385–388. doi:10.2307/3729821. ISSN 0026-7937. JSTOR 3729821.
- Ingham, Patricia (1982). "Review of Language in Modern Literature: Innovation and Experiment". The Review of English Studies. 33 (129): 65–66. doi:10.1093/res/XXXIII.129.65. ISSN 0034-6551. JSTOR 513919.
- Sage, Victor (1982). "Review of 'Language in modern literature: innovation and experiment'". Journal of Beckett Studies (7): 148–151. ISSN 0309-5207. JSTOR 44782696.
