= Peter Porter (poet) =

British-based Australian poet (1929– 2010)

Peter Porter OAM
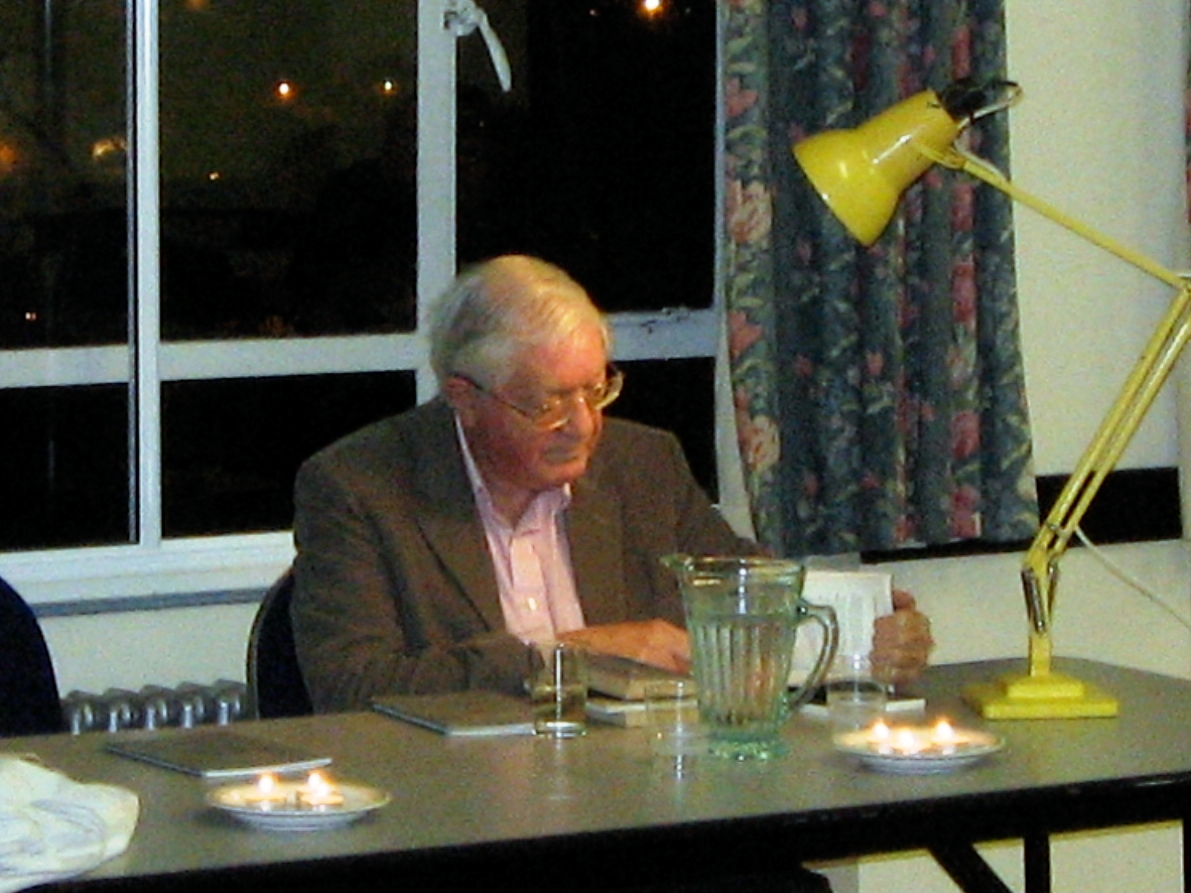
- Porter in 2007
- Born: Peter Neville Frederick Porter; 16 February 1929; Brisbane, Queensland, Australia
- Died: 23 April 2010 (aged 81); London, United Kingdom
- Resting place: Highgate Cemetery
- Occupation: Poet
- Spouse(s): Jannice Henry (died 1974), Christine Berg
- Writing career
- Language: British

Peter Neville Frederick Porter OAM (16 February 1929 – 23 April 2010) was a British-based Australian poet.

== Life ==
Porter was born in Brisbane, Australia, in 1929. His mother, Marion, died of a burst gall-bladder in 1938. He was educated at the Anglican Church Grammar School (then known as the Church of England Grammar School) and left school at 18 to work as a trainee journalist at The Courier-Mail. However, he only lasted a year with the paper before he was dismissed. He emigrated to England in 1951. On the boat he met the future novelist Jill Neville. Porter was portrayed in Neville's first book, The Fall Girl (1966). After two suicide attempts, he returned to Brisbane. Ten months later he was back in England. In 1955, he began attending meetings of "The Group". It was his association with "The Group" that allowed him to publish his first collection in 1961.

He married Jannice Henry, from Marlow, Buckinghamshire, in 1961 and they had two daughters (born in 1962 and 1965). During this period he worked in advertising, and was beginning to find work in the literary press. Jannice took her life in 1974, greatly affecting Porter's work, in particular The Cost of Seriousness. In 1991 Porter married Christine Berg.

In 2001, he was named Poet in Residence at the Royal Albert Hall. In 2004 he was a candidate for the position of Professor of Poetry at Oxford University. In 2007, he was made a Royal Society of Literature Companion of Literature, an honour bestowed on a maximum of ten living writers.

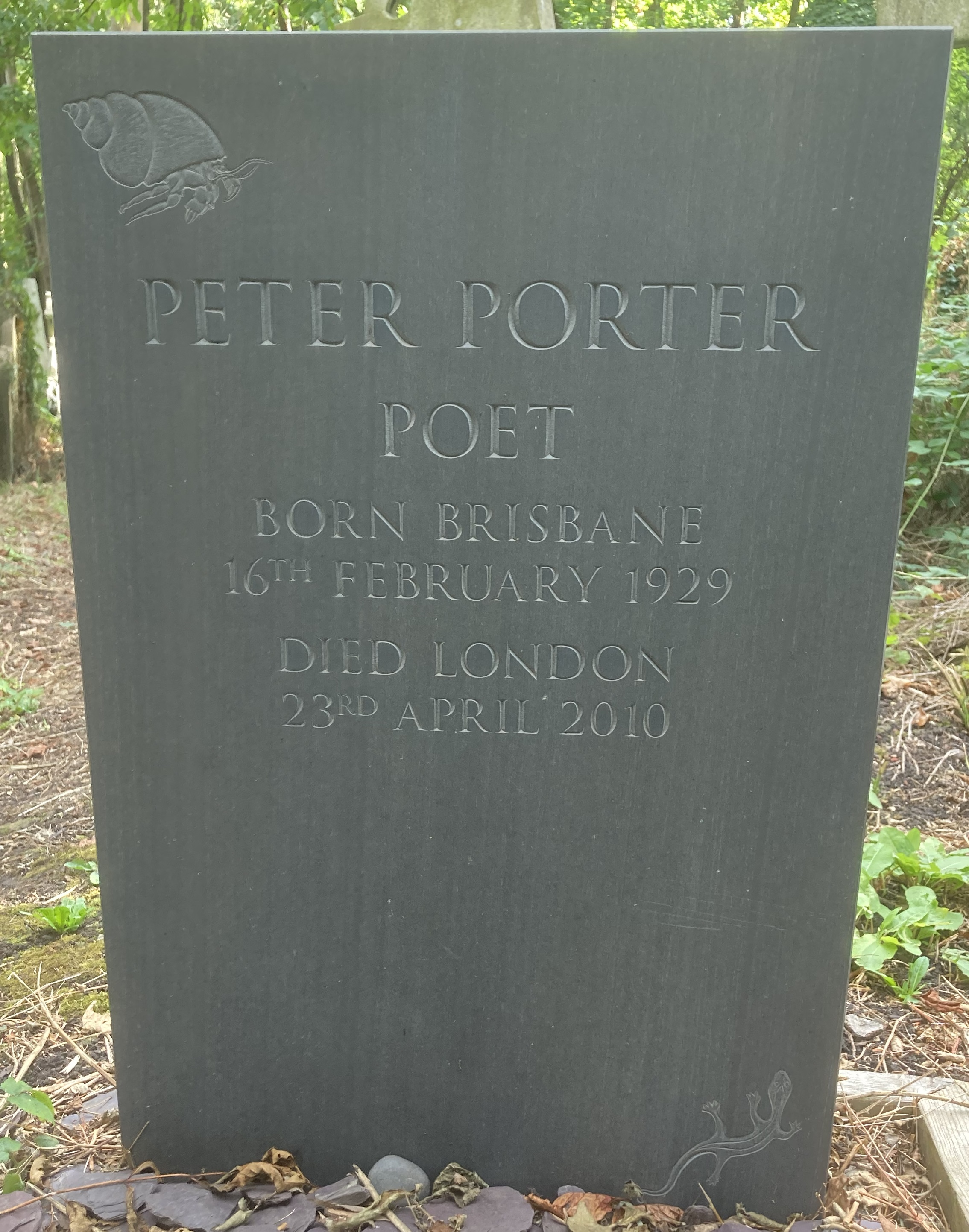
Grave of Peter Porter in Highgate Cemetery

Porter died on 23 April 2010, aged 81, after suffering from liver cancer for a year. After news of Porter's death in 2010, the Australian Book Review (ABR) announced that, in his honour, it would rename its ABR Poetry Prize as the Peter Porter Poetry Prize. He was buried on the eastern side of Highgate Cemetery.

== Work ==
His poems first appeared in the Summer 1958 and October 1959 issues of Delta. The publication of his poem Metamorphosis in The Times Literary Supplement in January 1960 brought his work to a wider audience. His first collection Once Bitten Twice Bitten was published by Scorpion Press in 1961. Influences on his work include W. H. Auden, John Ashbery and Wallace Stevens.. He went through distinct poetic stages, from the epigrams and satires of his early works Once Bitten Twice Bitten, to the elegiac mode of his later ones; The Cost of Seriousness and English Subtitles. In a recorded conversation with his friend Clive James he stated that

the glory of present-day English writing in America, in Australia and in Britain, is what is left over of the old regular metrical pattern and how that can be adapted to the new sense that the main element, the main fixture of poetry is no longer the foot (you know, the iambus or the trochee) but the cadence. It seems that what is very important is to get the best of the old authority, the best of the old discipline along with the best of the new freedom of expression.

In 1983 Porter was a judge in the Booker–McConnell Prize.

== Awards ==
- 1983: Duff Cooper Memorial Prize for his first Collected Poems
- 1988: Whitbread Poetry Award for Automatic Oracle
- 1990: Australian Literature Society Gold Medal for Possible Worlds
- 1997: The Age Book of the Year Award – Dinny O'Hearn Poetry Prize, joint-winner for Dragons in Their Pleasant Palaces
- 1998: The First King's Lynn Award for Merit in Poetry
- 2000: Philip Hodgins Memorial Medal at the Mildura Writer's Festival
- 2002: Forward Poetry Prize for Max Is Missing
- 2002: Queen's Gold Medal for Poetry
- 2004: Medal of the Order of Australia
- 2004: Honorary Fellow of the English Association, UK
- 2007: Royal Society of Literature Companion of Literature
- 2009: Honorary Doctorate, Nottingham Trent University
- 2009: Age Book of the Year Poetry Prize for Better Than God

== Bibliography ==
=== Poetry collections ===
- Once Bitten Twice Bitten, Scorpion Press, 1961
- Poems Ancient and Modern, Scorpion Press, 1964
- A Porter Folio, Scorpion Press, 1969
- The Last of England, Oxford University Press, 1970
- After Martial, Oxford University Press, 1972
- Preaching to the Converted, Oxford University Press, 1972
- Jonah, with Arthur Boyd, Secker & Warburg, 1973
- Living in a Calm Country, Oxford University Press, 1975
- The Lady and the Unicorn, with Arthur Boyd, Secker & Warburg, 1975
- The Cost of Seriousness, Oxford University Press, 1978
- English Subtitles, Oxford University Press, 1981
- Fast Forward, Oxford University Press, 1984
- Narcissus with Arthur Boyd, London: Seckers & Warburg, 1984
- The Automatic Oracle, Oxford University Press, 1987
- Mars, with Arthur Boyd, Deutsch, 1987
- Possible Worlds, Oxford University Press, 1989
- The Chair of Babel, Oxford University Press, 1992
- Millennial Fables, Oxford University Press, 1994
- Dragons in Their Pleasant Palaces, Oxford University Press, 1997
- Both Ends Against the Middle, 1999, as a section in Collected Poems Volume 2
- Max Is Missing, Picador/Macmillan, 2001
- Afterburner, Picador/Macmillan, 2004
- Better Than God, Picador, 2009
- Chorale at the Crossing, Pan Macmillan, 2016 (Posthumous)

=== Selected and collected poetry ===
- Collected Poems, Oxford University Press, 1983.
- A Porter Selected: Poems 1959–1989. Oxford University Press, 1989.
- Collected Poems. 2 vols. Oxford & Melbourne: Oxford University Press, 1999.

=== Chapbooks ===
==== Poetry ====
- Solemn Adultery at Breakfast Creek The Keepsake Press, London, 1968 (200 copies)
- A Share of the Market Ulsterman Publications, Belfast, 1973.
- The Animal Programme: Four Poems Anvil Press Poetry Ltd, London, 1982 (250 copies). ISBN 0-85646-107-5.
- Machines with illustrations by George Szirtes, Mandeville, Hitchin, Hertfordshire, 1986 (250 copies). ISBN 0-904533-92-1.
- A King's Lynn Suite, King's Lynn Poetry Festival, 1999.
- Return to Kerguelen, Vagabond Press, London, 2001.

==== Essays ====
- Browning's Important Parleying: Stylistics across two centuries Leo S. Olschki Editore, Firenze, 1991.

=== Broadsheets ===
- Words Without Music, Sycamore Press, 1968.
- Epigrams by Martial, Poem-of-the-Month Club, 1971.

=== Translations ===
- After Martial Oxford University Press, 1972.
- from the Greek Anthology in Penguin Classics edition
- Michelangelo, Life, Letters, and Poetry, with George Bull Oxford University Press, 1987.
- Liu Hongbin, A Day Within Days, with the author. Ambit Books, London 2006. (Link to a reading of Porter's translation)

=== Essay collections ===
- Saving from the Wreck: Essays on Poetry. Trent, 2001.

=== Books edited ===
- A Choice of Pope's Verse, Faber and Faber, 1971.
- New Poems, 1971–1972: A P. E. N. Anthology of Contemporary Poetry, Hutchinson, 1972.
- The English Poets: From Chaucer to Edward Thomas, with Anthony Thwaite, Secker & Warburg, 1974.
- New Poetry I, with Charles Osborne, Arts Council of Great Britain, 1975.
- Thomas Hardy, selected, with photographs by John Hedgecoe, Weidenfeld & Nicolson, 1981.
- The Faber Book of Modern Verse 4th edition, originally edited by Michael Roberts, Faber and Faber, 1982.
- William Blake, selected, Oxford University Press, 1986
- Christina Rossetti, selected, Oxford University Press, 1986
- William Shakespeare, with an introduction, C. N. Potter, 1987, Aurum, 1988.
- Complete Poems, by Martin Bell, Bloodaxe, 1988.
- John Donne, edited, Aurum, 1988.
- The Fate of Vultures: New Poetry of Africa, with Kofi Anyidoho, and Musaemura Zimunya. Heinemann International, 1989.
- Lord Byron, Aurum, 1989
- W. B. Yeats: The Last Romantic, Aurum, 1990.
- Percy Bysshe Shelley, selected, Aurum, 1991.
- Elizabeth Barrett Browning, selected, Aurum, 1992.
- Robert Burns, selected, Aurum, 1992.
- The Romantic Poets: Byron, Keats, Shelley, Wordsworth, selected, Aurum, 1992.
- Robert Browning, selected, Aurum, 1993.
- Samuel Taylor Coleridge, selected, Aurum, 1994.
- The Oxford Book of Modern Australian Verse, Oxford University Press, 1996.
- Selected Poems of Lawrence Durrell, Faber and Faber, 2006.

=== Scores and libretti ===
- Annotations of Auschwitz, with music by David Lumsdaine, Universal Edition, 1975.
- Orpheus: A Chamber Opera in One Act, music by Geoffrey Burgon, Chester Music, 1985.
- The Voice of Love, words for a song cycle, music by Nicholas Maw.
- St Francis and the Wolf, an opera for children, music by Ronald Senator

=== Selected list of poems ===
| Title | Year | First published | Reprinted/collected in |
|---|---|---|---|
| "Mort aux Chats" | 1972 | | Preaching to the Converted, Oxford University Press, 1972, pp. 46-47 |

== In other media ==
- In 1981, Scottish post-punk band Scars recorded a song of Porter's poem "Your Attention Please" on their studio album Author! Author!.

== Sources ==
- When London Calls: The Expatriation of Australian Creative Artists to Britain, Cambridge University Press, 1999
- Kaiser, John R: Peter Porter: A Bibliography 1954 – 1986 Mansell, London and New York, 1990. ISBN 0-7201-2032-2.
- Steele, Peter, Peter Porter: Oxford Australian Writers Oxford University Press, Melbourne, 1992. ISBN 0-19-553282-1
