= Francis Berry =

British academic, poet, critic and translator

Francis Berry (23 March 1915 – 10 October 2006) was a British academic, poet, critic and translator.

He was born in Ipoh, Malaya, and educated at the University of London and the University of Exeter. After serving as an army soldier during World War II, and then as a schoolteacher in Malta, he held various appointments in English literature. He was professor of English Literature at the University of Sheffield from 1947 to 1970, where he was a friend of William Empson. From 1970 until his retirement in 1980, he was professor at Royal Holloway, University of London. He also wrote radio plays, and an edited translation of the Sauđarkrokur manuscripts entitled I Tell of Greenland (1977).

His first collection of poetry, Gospel of Fire, was published in 1933; his Collected Poems, drawing on 11 books, appeared in 1994. His work has been praised by G. Wilson Knight and Philip Hobsbaum.

His critical writing includes books on John Masefield and Herbert Read. A number of his papers are archived at the Harry Ransom Center in Austin, Texas, USA and at Leeds University Library. His son is The Telegraph Cricket correspondent Scyld Berry.

== Publications ==
=== Poetry ===
- Gospel of Fire. Francis Berry, London, E. Mathews & Marrot, 1933.
- Snake in the Moon. Poems, London, Williams & Norgate, 1936.
- The Iron Christ. A poem, London, Williams & Norgate, 1936.
- Fall of a Tower and Other Poems, London, Fortune Press, 1942.
- Murdock and Other Poems, London, Dakers, 1947.
- The Galloping Centaur: Poems 1933–1951, London, Methuen, 1952.
- Morant Bay and other poems, London, Routledge & Kegan Paul, 1961.
- Ghosts of Greenland, London, Routledge & Kegan Paul, 1967.
- I tell of Greenland: an edited translation of the Saudarkrokur manuscripts. Francis Berry, London, Routledge & Kegan Paul, 1977.
- From the Red Fort, Bristol, Redcliffe, 1984.
- Collected poems / Francis Berry, Bristol, Redcliffe, 1994.

=== Radio Plays ===
- Illnesses and Ghosts at the West Settlement, 1965;
- The Sirens, 1966;
- The Near Singing Dome, 1971;
- Eyre Remembers, 1982

=== Novels ===
- I Tell of Greenland. London, Routledge, 1977.

=== Critical Writings ===
- Herbert Read, London, Longman, 1953; revised edition, 1961.
- Poets' Grammar: Person, Time and Mood in Poetry, London, Routledge, 1958; Westport, Connecticut, Greenwood Press, 1974.
- Poetry and the Physical Voice, London, Routledge, and New York, Oxford University Press, 1962.
- The Shakespeare Inset: Word and Picture, London, Routledge, 1965; New York, Theatre Arts, 1966; revised edition, Carbondale, Southern Illinois University Press, 1971.
