= Penelope Shuttle =

British poet (born 1947)

- Born: 12 May 1947 (age 79); Staines, Middlesex, England
- Occupation: Poet
- Spouse: Peter Redgrove (died 2003)
- Children: 1
- Writing career
- Notable awards: Cholmondeley Award (2007)

Penelope Shuttle (born 12 May 1947) is an English poet and author. She has published fifteen volumes of poetry, plus two selected volumes, and six works of fiction. She has won the Eric Gregory Award and the Cholmondeley Award and has been shortlisted for the Forward Poetry Prize and the T.S. Eliot Prize. She is also known for The Wise Wound, a non-fictional work on menstruation, which she wrote with her late husband Peter Redgrove.

== Life ==
Born in Staines, Middlesex, Shuttle left school at 17. She has lived in Falmouth, Cornwall since 1970. She married the poet Peter Redgrove (1932–2003) and they have a daughter, Zoe.

Shuttle is a founder member of the Falmouth Poetry Group, founded in 1972. She is a Hawthornden Fellow, and a tutor for the Poetry School.

== Career ==
Shuttle wrote her first novel at the age of 20. She published her debut, the novella, An Excusable Vengeance, in 1967. She has since published five more novellas and novels, as well as an omnibus collection.

Shuttle is better known for her poetry, having published fifteen original volumes and two selected volumes. She won an Eric Gregory Award in 1974. Her first selected volume was a Poetry Book Society Recommendation in 1998. Her ninth volume, Redgrove's Wife, was shortlisted for the Forward Poetry Prize and the T. S. Eliot Prize and won the 2007 Cholmondeley Award. Sandgrain and Hourglass was a Poetry Book Society Recommendation in 2010. Her collection Lyonesse was longlisted for the 2022 Laurel Prize, an award for environmental or nature poetry established by Simon Armitage.

=== The Wise Wound ===
In 1978, Shuttle and her husband Peter Redgrove published a non-fiction book about menstruation, The Wise Wound.

The Victor Gollancz Ltd publishers file for The Wise Wound is held in University College Cork Library as the Shuttle-Redgrove Collection. This collection was acquired in May 2019 and consists of correspondences, contemporary reviews of The Wise Wound and letters from various individuals praising the work, including the poets Ted Hughes and D.M. Thomas.

Shuttle and Redgrove published a sequel, Alchemy for Women, in 1995.

== Awards ==
- 1974 Eric Gregory Award
- Selected Poems (OUP, 1998) Poetry Book Society Recommendation
- 2007 Cholmondeley Award
- Sandgrain and Hourglass (Bloodaxe Books, 2010) Poetry Book Society Recommendation

== Works ==
=== Poetry collections ===
- Nostalgia Neurosis: & Other Poems. S. Albert's P. 1968.
- The Songbook of the Snow, and Other Poems. Janus Press. 1974.
- The Orchard Upstairs. Oxford: Oxford University Press. 1980. ISBN 978-0-19-211938-4.
- Child-Stealer. Oxford: Oxford University Press. 1983. ISBN 978-0-19-211956-8.
- The Lion from Rio. Oxford: Oxford University Press. 1986. ISBN 978-0-19-281974-1.
- Adventures with my Horse. Oxford: Oxford University Press. 1988. ISBN 978-0-19-282218-5.
- Taxing the Rain. Oxford: Oxford University Press. 1992. ISBN 978-0-19-282993-1.
- Building a City for Jamie. Oxford: Oxford University Press. 1996. ISBN 978-0-19-282517-9.
- Selected Poems. Oxford: Oxford University Press. 1998. ISBN 978-0-19-288076-5.
- A Leaf out of his Book. Manchester: Carcanet. 1999. ISBN 978-1-903039-00-7.
- Redgrove's Wife. Bloodaxe Books. 2006. ISBN 978-1-85224-734-8.
- Sandgrain and Hourglass. Bloodaxe Books. 2010.
- Unsent: New and Selected Poems 1980-2012. Bloodaxe Books. 2012. ISBN 978-1852249502.
- Four portions of everything on the menu for M'sieur Monet!. Indigo Dreams Publishing. 2016. ISBN 978-1-910834-21-3.
- Father Lear. Poetry Salzburg. 2020. ISBN 978-3-901993-79-4.
- Will you walk a little faster?. Bloodaxe Books. 2017.
- Lyonesse. Bloodaxe Books. 2021.

=== Fiction ===
- An Excusable Vengeance (novella in New Writers 6). Calder & Boyars. 1967.
- All the Usual Hours of Sleeping. Calder & Boyars. 1969.
- Jesusa (novella). Granite Press. 1971.
- Wailing Monkey Embracing a Tree. Calder & Boyars. 1973. ISBN 0-7145-0939-6.
- Rainsplitter in the Zodiac Garden. Marion Boyars. 1977. ISBN 978-0-7145-2560-0.
- The Mirror of the Giant. Marion Boyars. 1980. ISBN 978-0-7145-2679-9.
- The Penelope Shuttle Omnibus. Verbivoracious Press. 2015. ISBN 9789810959821.

=== Prose books ===
- Penelope Shuttle, Peter Redgrove (1978). The Wise Wound. London: Gollancz. ISBN 978-0-399-90024-2.
- Penelope Shuttle, Peter Redgrove (1995). Alchemy for Women: Personal Transformation Through Dreams and the Female Cycle. Rider. ISBN 978-0-7126-9859-7.
