= Musaemura Zimunya =

Zimbabwean writer (born 1949)

Musaemura Bonas Zimunya
- Born: November 14, 1949 (age 76); Umtali, Rhodesia (now Mutare, Zimbabwe)
- Occupation: writer
- Writing career
- Language: English

Musaemura Bonas Zimunya (born 14 November 1949) is one of Zimbabwe's most important contemporary writers.

== Life ==
Zimunya was born in Umtali, Rhodesia (now Mutare, Zimbabwe), to Mandiera Watch and Kufera Zimunya. In 1973 he was expelled from the University of Rhodesia for 'disturbing the peace'. While exiled in Great Britain he studied at the University of Kent, Canterbury. He got a Bachelor's degree in 1978 and a Master's degree in 1979. His MA dissertation was later published as Those Years of Drought and Hunger: The Birth of African Fiction in English in Zimbabwe.

In 1980, he returned to newly independent Zimbabwe where he settled and married Viola Catherine, and took a University of Zimbabwe position as a professor of English that he has kept since. He has been secretary general of the Zimbabwean Writers' Union. In 1992 he received a Fulbright scholarship to the Pratt Institute in New York. He left Zimbabwe in 1999 for the USA and is currently Director of Black Studies at Virginia Tech.

== Work ==
Zimunya's poetry deals with the beauty of Zimbabwe, but also with its poverty and history of suffering, and with urban alienation from spiritual heritage. Most of his published work is in English, but he also writes in Shona.

Zimunya began publishing poems when he was still at school, in literary journals like Two-Tone and Chirimo. His early poetry often revealed an imaginative appreciation of the beauty of nature. While his collection Thought Tracks (1982) represents a generation that felt marginalized by colonialism, Kingfisher, Jikinya and other poems, published in the same year, is a celebration of love and nature.

Country Dawns and City Lights (1985) takes a disillusioned look at the idealization of rural life, while also confronting the difficulties faced by the urban dweller. Perfect Poise (1993) and Selected Poems (1995) are collections that contain both the lyricism of his earlier work and the cynical perspective of the critic.

Zimunya has published one collection of short stories, Nightshift (1993), and a volume of literary criticism. His work has also been published in British and Amerikan anthologies, in Kizito Muchemwas Zimbabwean Poetry in English (1978), and in the collection he co-edited with Mudereri Khadani, And Now the Poets Speak (1981).

In the afterword to the Serbian/English version of his Collected Poems in 1995, Zimunya described his poetry thus: When you read these poems, it is my cherished hope that you will gain some insight… into the brutality of colonialism, the vagaries of growing up permanently dispossessed in a racially structured society, the tortuous quest for reconciliation of a shattered old culture with a hostile and spiritless new world cultivated to disadvantage the African and… the undying quest for harmony with nature… And then also you may wonder about the chaos artistic rhythms and traditions forever tussling for my creative attention.

== Bibliography ==
=== Poetry ===
- Thought Tracks Longman, 1982. ISBN 0-582-78560-X
- Kingfisher, Jikinya and other poems Longman Zimbabwe, 1982. ISBN 0-582-60988-7
- Country Dawns and City Lights Longman Zimbabwe, 1985. ISBN 0-582-89525-1
- Perfect Poise College Press, 1993. ISBN 1-77900-147-9
- Selected Poems Longman, 1995

=== Short stories ===
- Nightshift Longman, 1993. ISBN 1-77903-076-2

=== Literary criticism ===
- Those Years of Drought and Hunger: The Birth of African Fiction in English in Zimbabwe 1982. ISBN 0-86922-183-3

=== As editor ===
- And Now the Poets Speak Mambo Press, 1981. With Mudereri Khadani
- The Fate of Vultures: New Poetry of Africa Heinemann International, 1989. With Kofi Anyidoho and Peter Porter. ISBN 0-435-90550-3
- Birthright: Selection of Poems from Southern Africa Longman International Education, 1990. ISBN 0-582-89523-5
