= Scorpion Press =

The Scorpion Press was a small publisher, situated in Northwood, London, active at least as early as 1959. They published a number of titles including the first three collections of Peter Porter. They ceased operations in the early 1970s.
