= Gabriel Guist'hau =

French politician (1863–1931)

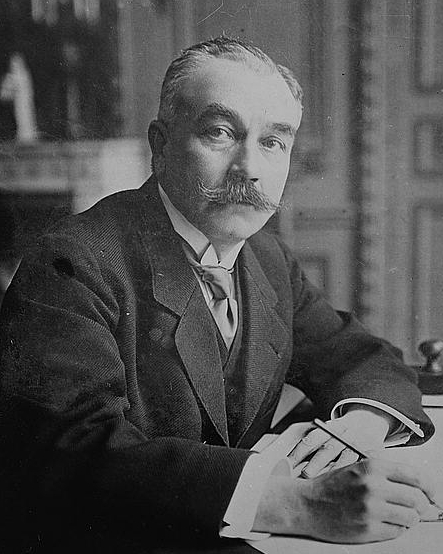

Mayor of Nantes
- In office 1908–1910
- Preceded by: Joseph Canal
- Succeeded by: Paul Bellamy

Personal details
- Born: 22 September 1863 Saint-Pierre, Réunion
- Died: 27 November 1931 (aged 68) Nantes, France
- Party: Radical Party
- Education: University of Nantes
- Profession: Lawyer

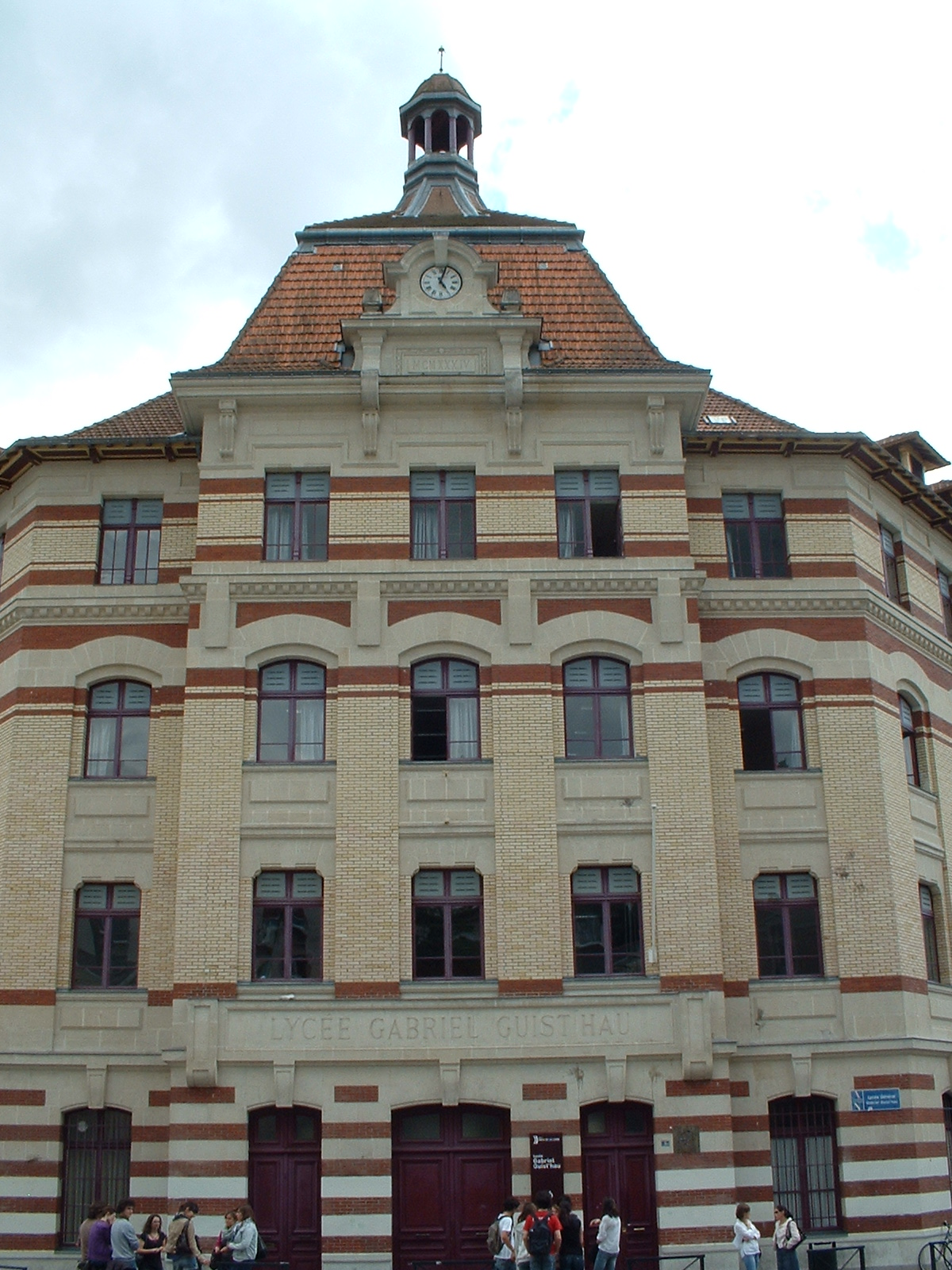
Lycée Gabriel Guist'hau

Henri Gabriel Guist'hau (born Henri-Gabriel Guist'hau; 22 September 1863, Saint-Pierre, Réunion – 27 November 1931, Nantes, France) was a French politician. He served as Mayor of Nantes from 1908 to 1910, represented Loire-Inférieure in the Chamber of Deputies from 1910 to 1924, and held several ministerial offices during the French Third Republic.

Guist'hau left Réunion for Nantes to study law. He earned a doctorate in law and became a lawyer at the Nantes bar, where he became acquainted with Aristide Briand. Alongside his legal practice, he was active in the mutual aid movement and represented the Loire-Inférieure mutual societies on the Superior Council of Mutuality from 1908 to 1920.

== Municipal career ==
Guist'hau was first elected to the Nantes municipal council in 1892 and was re-elected in 1896 and 1900. During his early municipal career, he focused on urban development and improving working conditions for municipal employees.

Following the municipal elections of 1908, he became Mayor of Nantes shortly after the incorporation of the neighbouring communes of Chantenay and Doulon into the city. His administration oversaw the early integration of the newly annexed districts. He resigned as mayor in December 1910 after joining the national government, although he remained a municipal councillor until 1912.

He went on to become a deputy of the Assemblée nationale from 1910 to 1924. He was minister of Public Instruction and Fine Arts in 1912, minister of Commerce and Industry in 1913, and finally, minister of the Navy in 1921. As minister of the Navy, he oversaw the reconstruction of the French Navy, after the ravages of the First World War. He was elevated to Officer of the Légion d'honneur in 1924.

== National political career ==
Elected to the Chamber of Deputies for Loire-Inférieure in 1910, Guist'hau sat with the Radical-Socialist Republicans and served as rapporteur for the budget of religious affairs. He later became associated with the Democratic Alliance.

He held several ministerial posts during his parliamentary career. As Minister of Public Instruction and Fine Arts (1912–1913) in Raymond Poincaré's government, he supported classical education while introducing measures to improve the status of primary school teachers. He subsequently served as Minister of Commerce and Industry in 1913, securing the passage of legislation concerning the staff of technical and vocational education.

During the First World War, Guist'hau became the first president of the France–United States Association upon its establishment in 1916.

Re-elected in 1919 on Aristide Briand's Republican Union list, he chaired the Chamber's Colonial Affairs Committee and later served as Minister of the Navy in Briand's government from 1921 to 1922.

Guist'hau retired from political and professional life in 1924. He spent his remaining years in Nantes, where he died in 1931 at the age of 68.
