= Scyld Berry =

English journalist and cricket correspondent

Anthony Scyld Ivens Berry, known as Scyld Berry (pronounced Shild, born 28 April 1954) is an English journalist and cricket correspondent of the Daily Telegraph. He was editor of Wisden Cricketers' Almanack from 2008 until 2011.

He has been cricket correspondent of the Observer, the Sunday Correspondent, the Independent on Sunday, the Sunday Telegraph, and the Daily Telegraph. His father was the poet and critic Francis Berry.

== Books ==
- Cricket Wallah: With England in India 1981-2 (1982)
- Train to Julia Creek: A Journey to the Heart of Australia (1985)
- The Observer on Cricket: An Anthology of the Best Cricket Writing (1987)
- Phil Edmonds' 100 Greatest Bowlers (1989; co-writer)
- Cricket's Burning Passion: Ivo Bligh and the Story of the Ashes (2006; co-writer with Rupert Peploe)
- Testing Times: In Pursuit of the Ashes (2009; co-writer with Andrew Strauss)
- Cricket: The Game of Life: Every Reason to Celebrate (2015)
- Beyond the Boundaries: Travels on England Cricket Tours (2021)
- Disappearing World: The 18 First-Class Cricket Counties (2023)
- 500 Declared: The Joys of Covering 500 Cricket Tests (2025)
