= Poetry as Confession =

Poetry as Confession was an influential 1959 article written by M. L. Rosenthal, reviewing the poetry collection Life Studies by Robert Lowell. The review is credited with being the first application of the term of confession to an approach to the writing of poetry. This led to an entire movement of 20th Century poetry being called 'Confessional poetry'. The article was published in The Nation on 19 September 1959, and was later collected in Rosenthal's book of selected essays and reviews, Our Life In Poetry (1991). Some material from the essay was used in an essay Rosenthal published the following year in his book The Modern Poets: A Critical Introduction.

The review opens with a reference to Emily Dickinson and noting the new trend towards confession in poetry:

Emily Dickinson once called publication "the auction of the mind." Robert Lowell seems to regard it more as soul's therapy. The use of poetry for the most naked kind of confession grows apace in our day."

Rosenthal proceeds to compare the current day approach with that of the poets of the Romantic period such as John Keats. The Romantics, he asserts, found "cosmic equations and symbols". Keats transcended his "personal complaint", and lost it in the "music of universal folornness". Rosenthal introduces the adjective "confessional" when hew moves on to Walt Whitman and his Calamus poems:

Whitman took American poetry to the very edge of the confessional in his Calamus poems.

T. S. Eliot and Ezra Pound are brought up, in the context of the influence of the Symbolists, and how they take us to the "forbidden realm" although "a certain indirection masks the poet's actual face and psyche". But, Rosenthal continues,

Lowell removes the mask. His speaker is unequivocally himself, and it is hard not to think of Life Studies as a series of personal confidences, rather shameful, that one is honor-bound not to reveal.

== See also ==
- 1959 in poetry
