= David Lumsdaine =

Australian composer (1931–2024)

David Newton Lumsdaine (31 October 1931 – 12 January 2024) was an Australian composer.

== Biography ==
David Newton Lumsdaine was born on 31 October 1931. He studied at the New South Wales Conservatorium of Music (as it was then known). He moved to England in 1953 and for a while shared a flat with fellow expatriate, the poet Peter Porter, with whom he collaborated on several projects including the cantata Annotations of Auschwitz (1964). In London he first studied composition with Mátyás Seiber and then at the Royal Academy of Music with Lennox Berkeley. In 1970 he took a lecturing position at Durham University. In 1981 he took a post as senior lecturer at King's College London. He is published by The University of York Music Press and Universal Edition.

In 1979 he married the composer Nicola LeFanu. David Lumsdaine died on 12 January 2024 at the age of 92.

== Works ==
Lumsdaine disowned all works he composed before Annotations of Auschwitz (1964). His first acknowledged works were composed using a variety of pitch and rhythm techniques associated with serialism – techniques such as pitch rotation or permutation, and isorhythmic structures linking pitch and duration together. Central to all of Lumsdaine's work is the notion of 'ground', a term borrowed from Baroque musical terminology (specifically Purcell).

The orchestral works 'Salvation Creek with Eagle' and 'Hagoromo' (1974 and 1977 respectively) continue and develop Lumsdaine's personal take on Australian nature.

Lumsdaine's output also included piano works – notably the Bach-inspired 'Ruhe Sanfte, Sanfte Ruh' (1974) – and a considerable number of pieces involving electronics, such as the tape montage/re-composition of events from the Durham Miners Gala 'Big Meeting'. The chamber works include a series of works entitled 'Mandala', a cello concerto, several song cycles and an orchestral fifth 'Mandala' (1989), a homage to Australian landscapes and soundscapes. Shortly after composing his dense and energetic 'Kali Dances' for ensemble in 1996, Lumsdaine retired from composition.

The following is a list of Lumsdaine's acknowledged works:

=== Ballet ===
1973: Meridian (percussion, piano, tape)

=== Chamber ===
1968: Mandala I (wind quintet)

1969: Mandala II (flute, clarinet, percussion, viola, cello)

1971: Kangaroo Hunt (piano, percussion)

1978: Mandala III (solo piano, flute, clarinet, viola, cello, bell)

1983: Mandala IV (string quartet)

1985: Bagatelles (flute, clarinet, piano, violin, viola, cello)

1986: Empty Sky – Mootwingee (flute, trombone/horn, cello, 2 percussionists, 2 pianos)

1988: A Dance and a Hymn for Alexander Maconochie (flute, clarinet, percussion, mandolin, guitar, violin, double bass)

1989: Round Dance (sitar, tabla, flute, cello, keyboard)

1990: Sine nomine (alto saxophone/bass clarinet, percussion)

1993: Rain Drums (4 percussionists)

1994: Kali Dances (flute, oboe, clarinet, trumpet, tuba, vibraphone, piano, violin, viola, cello, double bass)

=== Choral ===
1975: Dum medium silentium (SATB)

1985: Where the lilies grow (8 voices)

=== Incidental music ===
1991: The Crane (flute, percussion, harp, synthesizer)

=== Orchestral ===
1968-9 Episodes (orchestra)

1974: Salvation Creek with Eagle (chamber orchestra)

1975: Sunflower (chamber orchestra)

1975: A Little Dance of Hagoromo (orchestra)

1977: Hagoromo (large orchestra)

1982: Shoalhaven (orchestra)

1988: Mandala V (orchestra)

1990: The Arc of Stars (string orchestra)

1992: A Garden of Earthly Delights (cello, orchestra)

=== Other ===
1990: 2 Just So Stories (The Elephant's Child, The Sing Song of Old Man Kangaroo) (narrator, dancer, live electronics)

=== Piano ===
1966: Kelly Ground

1967: Flights (2 pianos)

1974: Ruhe sanfte, sanfte Ruh'

1980: Cambewarra, 1980

1994: 6 Postcard Pieces

=== Solo cello ===
1992: Blue upon Blue

=== Solo shakuhachi ===
1993: Curlew in the Mist

=== Sopranino recorder ===
1994: Metamorphosis at Mullet Creek

=== Vocal ===
1964: Annotations of Auschwitz (soprano, flute + bass flute, trumpet, horn, piano, violin, cello)

1966, rev. 71: Easter Fresco (soprano, flute, horn, harp, piano)

1974: My Sister's Song (soprano)

1982: What shall I sing? (soprano, 2 clarinets)

1990: A Tree Telling of Orpheus (soprano, flute, clarinet, violin, viola, cello)

1992: A Norfolk Song Book (soprano recorders/flutes)

1993: A Child's Grace (voice, oboe, harp)
