= Ronald Senator =

Ronald Senator (17 April 1926 – 29 April 2015) was a British composer who divided his time between New York City and London.

== Early life ==
Senator, from a Jewish family, studied at Oxford University (1944–1947) with Egon Wellesz, a distinguished pupil of Arnold Schoenberg, and later (1955–58) with Arnold Cooke, a pupil of Paul Hindemith, at London University.

== Career ==
He became a Senior Lecturer in Music at London University, then in 1981 was appointed Professor of Composition at the Guildhall School of Music. He also held visiting Professorships at universities in Australia, the United States and Canada.

== Work ==
Senator's oratorio Holocaust Requiem was premiered at Canterbury Cathedral in 1986, under the aegis of the United Nations, the International Council of Christians and Jews, the Government of Germany, and the B'nai Brith. It has since been performed in many places worldwide, including the U.S. (Tillis Center, 1988; Manhattan, 1990); Moscow, 1993; Czechoslovakia (Terezín 1995); Rome (1991, one month after the 9/11 attacks, Un Concerto per la Pace). For the Manhattan performance of 1990, Lukas Foss conducted the Brooklyn Philharmonic and Ron Silver was Narrator.

Concerts devoted entirely to Senator's music have been given in New York City (1990, 1998, 2001), London (1989, 1997, 2006), Sydney (1978), Moscow (1993), and Saint Petersburg (1991).

Senator composed six operas and musicals on texts by modern authors including Anthony Burgess, Peter Porter, and Ursula Vaughan Williams. Many of his chamber works are composed for eminent colleagues, such as the singers Sybil Michelow, Jane Manning, Willard White, the violist Rivka Golani, the clarinettist Stanley Drucker and the pianist Miriam Brickman, the composer's wife.

Senator's work as an author includes his Requiem Letters, described by Publishers Weekly as "a deeply moving and haunting autobiographical memoir".

Senator established an international reputation as a composer and as a leading innovator in musical education. His work on the universal operations of music, set out in his book The Gaia of Music, had a practical counterpart in his system of musical education called Musicolor. This was developed in a programme at London University sponsored by the British Social Science Research Council, and involved teachers at every level of education. The system has been used in schools and colleges and was the subject of two BBC documentaries.

Senator was a founding member of the Montserrat Composers’ Association for Sacred Music, which was initiated with the support of composers including Stravinsky, Messiaen, André Jolivet and Penderecki. He was also the founding director of the National Association of Music Theatre in the United Kingdom.

His music is published by Ricordi, Boosey and Hawkes, EMI, and distributed by Fabermusic.

== Death ==
Senator and his second wife Miriam Brickman died in a house fire at their home in Yonkers, New York on 30 April 2015.

== Sources ==
- Grove's Dictionary of Music and Musicians 2000
- International Who's Who (Debrett)
