= Peter Redgrove =

British poet (1932–2003)

- Born: 2 January 1932; Kingston upon Thames, Surrey, Britain
- Died: 16 June 2003 (aged 71)
- Occupation: Poet
- Spouse: Penelope Shuttle

Peter William Redgrove (2 January 1932 – 16 June 2003) was an English poet, who also wrote prose, novels and plays with his second wife Penelope Shuttle.

== Life and career ==
Redgrove was born in Kingston upon Thames, Surrey. He was educated at Taunton School, and Queens' College, Cambridge. While at Cambridge he edited Delta magazine for several issues, and met the poets Ted Hughes and Harry Guest. He left in 1954 without taking a degree, married the sculptor Barbara Sherlock, and went into copywriting.

In Cambridge Redgrove participated in Philip Hobsbaum's poetry discussion group. He continued to participate when these discussions moved to London and was thus a member of 'The Group'. He taught at the University at Buffalo in 1961/2, and was Gregory Fellow at the University of Leeds from 1962 to 1965. He was awarded the Queen's Gold Medal for Poetry in 1996.

Redgrove had three children from his first marriage to the sculptor Barbara Redgrove, and another with his second wife, poet Penelope Shuttle.

== Works ==
=== Poetry collections ===
- The Collector. Routledge and Kegan Paul. 1959.
- The Nature of Cold Weather and Other Poems. Routledge and Kegan Paul. 1961.
- At The White Monument (1963), poems
- The Force and Other Poems. Routledge & Kegan Paul. 1966.
- The God-Trap. Turret Books. 1966.
- The Sermon: A Prose-Poem. Poet & Printer. 1966.
- Peter Redgrove's work in progress. Poet & Printer. 1968. Introduced by D. M. Thomas (1969)
- The Old White Man: A Poem Adapted from a Chinese Tang Dynasty Story. Poet & Printer. 1968.
- The Mother, the Daughter, and the Sighing Bridge. Sycamore Press. 1970.
- The Shirt, the Skull & the Grape. Sceptre Press. 1970.
- Lover Hating Lover. Unicorn Press. 1970. Broadside.
- The Bedside Clock. Sycamore Press. 1971. Broadsheet 15.
- Love's Journeys (1971), poems
- Doctor Faust's Sea-Spiral Spirit & Other Poems (1972), poems
- Three Pieces for Voices. Poet and Printer. 1972.
- Two Poems (1972)
- Sons of My Skin: Selected Poems 1954–1974 (1975), edited by Marie Peel
- From Every Chink of the Ark (1977), poems
- Skull Event (1977)
- Ten Poems (1977)
- The Fortifiers, the Vitrifiers, and the Witches (1977)
- Happiness (1978), poems
- The White, Night-Flying Moths Called Souls (1978)
- New Poetry 5: An Arts Council Anthology (1979), editor with Jon Silkin
- The Weddings at Nether Powers (1979), poems
- The First Earthquake (1980)
- The Apple Broadcast and Other New Poems (1981)
- The Facilitators, or Mister Hole-in-the–Day (1982)
- Man Named East and other New Poems (1985)
- The Explanation of the Two Visions (1985)
- The Mudlark Poems & Grand Buveur (1986)
- In the Hall of the Saurians (1987), shortlisted for the Whitbread Prize for Poetry in 1987
- The Moon Disposes: Poems 1954—1987 (1987)
- The One Who Set Out To Study Fear (1989)
- Poems 1954–1987 (1989)
- Dressed as for a Tarot Pack (1990), poems
- Under the Reservoir (1992), poems
- The Laborators (1993)
- My Father's Trapdoors. Cape Poetry. 1994. ISBN 978-0-224-03896-6.
- Abyssophone (1995)
- Assembling a Ghost (1996), poems
- The Book of Wonders: The Best of Peter Redgrove's Poetry (1996), edited by Jeremy Robinson
- Orchard End (1997), poems
- Selected Poems (1999)
- From the Virgil Caverns (2002), poems
- Sheen (2003)
- Collected Poems (2012)

=== Novels ===
- In the Country of the Skin (1973), novel
- The Hermaphrodite Album (1973), with Penelope Shuttle
- From the Reflections of Mr. Glass (1974)
- A Romance, The Terror of Dr Treviles (1974), with Penelope Shuttle
- Aesculapian Notes (1975)
- The Glass Cottage (1976), fiction, with Penelope Shuttle
- The Sleep of the Great Hypnotist: The Life and Death and Life After Death of a Modern Magician (1979), novel
- The Beekeepers (1980), novel
- The God of Glass: A Morality (1979)
- The Working of Water (1984)

=== Plays ===
- Miss Carstairs Dressed for Blooding & Other Plays (1977).
- The Valley of Trelamia (1986) https://www.bbc.com/mediacentre/proginfo/2016/37/the-valley-of-trelamia

=== Short Stories collections ===
- The Cyclopean Mistress: Selected Short Fiction 1960–1990 (1993)
- What the Black Mirror Saw: New Short Fiction and Prose Poetry (1997)

=== As editor ===
- Poet's Playground 1963 (1963), editor
- Universities Poetry 7 (1965), editor
- New Poems 1967 (1968), editor with John Fuller, Harold Pinter
- Penguin Modern Poets 11 (1968), with D. M. Black and D. M. Thomas
- Lamb and Thundercloud (1975), editor
- Cornwall in Verse (1983), editor

=== Prose books ===
- The Wise Wound – Menstruation & Everywoman (1978), with Penelope Shuttle
- Alchemy for Women: Personal Transformation Through Dreams and the Female Cycle (1995), with Penelope Shuttle
- The Black Goddess and the Sixth Sense (1987)

=== Translations ===
- Para el ojo que duerme (2006). Translator: Jordi Doce. Luis Burgos Arte del Siglo XX.
