= Macha Rosenthal =

American poet (1917–1996)

- Born: March 14, 1917
- Died: July 21, 1996 (aged 79)
- Occupations: Poet; playwright

Macha Louis Rosenthal (March 14, 1917 – July 21, 1996) was an American poet, critic, editor, and teacher. The W. B. Yeats Society of New York renamed their award for achievement in Yeats studies the M. L. Rosenthal Award after Rosenthal's death. His 1959 essay, Poetry as Confession, is credited with being the first application of the term 'confession' to the writing of poetry and therefore for the naming of the confessional poetry movement.

== Biography ==
Rosenthal was born in Washington, D.C. He earned his B.A. (1937) and M.A. (1938) degrees at the University of Chicago. On January 7, 1939, he married Victoria Himmelstein, with whom he had three children: David, Alan, and Laura.

From 1939 to 1945, he taught as an instructor in English at Michigan State University. In 1946, he was hired as an instructor at New York University, where he earned his Ph.D. in 1949. In 1961, he served in the U.S. Cultural Exchange Program and was visiting specialist to Germany; in 1965, to Pakistan; in 1966, to Romania, Poland, and Bulgaria; and in 1980, to Italy and France. In 1974, he was a visiting poet in Israel. From 1977 to 1979 he served as director of the Poetics Institute at New York University, where he was a professor of English until 1996.

Rosenthal was a fellow of the American Council of Learned Societies and twice won Guggenheim Fellowships (1960–1964). He contributed poems, articles, and reviews to such leading journals as The New Yorker, the New Statesman, Poetry, The Spectator (London), ELH, and The Quarterly Review; he also served, from 1956–1961, as poetry editor of The Nation; from 1970-1978 as poetry editor of The Humanist; and from 1973-1990 as poetry editor of Present Tense. He published numerous books of criticism and collections of verse and edited various anthologies of poetry.

In 1973 Rosenthal was one of the signers of the Humanist Manifesto II.

M. L. Rosenthal died on July 21, 1996.

== Works ==
=== Poetry ===
- Blue Boy on Skates: Poems (1964)
- Beyond Power: New Poems (1969)

=== Essays and Reviews ===
- A primer of Ezra Pound (1960)
- Our Life in Poetry: Selected Essays and Reviews (1991)
- Running to Paradise: Yeats's Poetic Art (1994)
