= Edwin Brock =

British poet (1927–1997)

Edwin Brock (19 October 1927 – 7 September 1997) was a British poet. He published 10 volumes of poetry from 1959 through his death in 1997.

Two of Brock's poems in particular, Five Ways to Kill a Man (1972) and Song of the Battery Hen (1977), have been heavily anthologised.

== Early life ==
Brock was born in Dulwich, London on 19 October 1927. He grew up in a working-class family with no literary aspirations. He won a scholarship to a local grammar school but his formal education ended after he gained his School Certificate. Brock's interest in poetry was inspired by a paperback anthology of modern verse which he picked up idly as a bored 18-year-old, waiting to be de-mobbed from the Royal Navy at the end of the Second World War. This chance encounter in Hong Kong was to prove revelatory and from then on Brock, completely self-taught, began to write his own poems.

== Professional life ==
Gradually Brock started to be published, firstly in the smaller magazines and eventually in the Times Literary Supplement. During this period, Brock served as a police officer in the Metropolitan force, the unusual combination of policeman and poet giving rise to a brief period of fame when a tabloid journalist published an interview with Brock under the banner headline: "THE THINGS HE THINKS UP AS HE POUNDS THE PECKHAM BEAT". Brock was embarrassed by the sudden attention, but he continued to pursue his writing with serious intent. His efforts bore fruit when his first collection was accepted by the small but prestigious Scorpion Press in 1959. Its title, An Attempt at Exorcism, touches on the essentially personal nature of Brock's work, the frankness of which connects him to confessional poetry which at that time was in the ascendancy in the United States. Indeed, Brock is one of the few British poets of this period to be known in America, with New Directions publishing several of his collections.

Brock left the police to become an advertising copywriter, a profession which he claimed to despise, but in which he became very successful, creating the famous strapline for the UK Financial Times newspaper of 'No FT. No comment'. Brock resented the way work distracted him from his real creative life in poetry, but he continued to write alongside his career, publishing over a dozen collections and becoming increasingly prolific toward the end of his life. He was also editor of the magazine Ambit for almost four decades. In 1966 his status was recognised by his inclusion in the influential Penguin Modern Poets series together with Geoffrey Hill and Stevie Smith.

== Personal life and death ==
Brock married Patricia Weller (Nellie V. Weller, born 1930, died 2020) in 1949, with whom he had a son and daughter. The marriage proved to be an unhappy one and was dissolved in 1964. The traumatic experience of marital conflict and divorce permeated his poetry at the time, for instance in the bitter and powerful An Arrangement for Seeing Children. In 1964, Brock married Elizabeth Skilton to whom he remained married for 33 years until his death.

Brock died in Norfolk, England on 7 September 1997, at the age of 69.

== Titles ==
Brocapps listed ten volumes of poetry collections, a novel and an autobiography.

Brock wrote two of the best-known poems of the last century, Five Ways to Kill a Man and Song of the Battery Hen, but his work deserves wider recognition beyond these anthology favourites.

Brock's poems amply demonstrate the virtues of his "intensely felt, supple, direct and memorable work." Five Ways to Kill a Man is chilling in its deliberately emotionless tone as it uses the language of a practical manual to explore humanity's cruelty. Progress is reduced to the way in which mankind has "improved" its methods of killing. Inspired by a performance of Benjamin Britten's War Requiem and written quickly, the poem has an air of authority which Brock's reading emphasises. Song of the Battery Hen is similarly suited to being spoken aloud. Though written as a dramatic monologue, in his introduction Brock makes it clear the poem has autobiographical resonance. As such it is a good example of his belief that "most activity is an attempt to define oneself in one way or another: for me poetry, and only poetry, has provided this self-defining act.".

Brock's works include:

- An Attempt at Exorcism (poetry collection, 1959)
- The Little White God (novel, 1962)
- "A Cold Day At The Zoo" (1970)
- "Invisibility Is The Art Of Survival" (1972)
- "I Never Saw It Lit" (chapbook, 1974)
- "Paroxisms" (1974)
- "The Blocked Heart" (1976)
- Here, Now, Always (autobiography, 1977)
- "Song of the Battery Hen: Selected Poems" (1977)
- "The River & The Train" (1979)
- "Five Ways To Kill A Man: New and Selected Poems" (1990)
- "And Another Thing" (1999)
