= Lucien Scheler =

French author (1902–1999)

Lucien Scheler (1902 – 23 April 1999) was a French writer, poet, publisher, and bookseller who participated in the literary resistance against Nazism.

== Early life ==
Scheler was born in Kassel, Germany in 1902. He was the grandson of philologist Auguste Scheler.

== Career ==
From 1926 to 1928 Scheler and Armand Henneuse ran Les écrivains réunis, a publishing company that edited and published the poems of Michel Seuphor (a monograph on Frans Masereel) and Stanislas Fumet (a monograph on Marcel-Lenoir). During World War II, Scheler lived on Rue de Tournon in Paris, and worked as a bookseller and as an expert in ancient books. He then published Bibliographie de France, which contained works produced by French Resistance writers. From October 1942 to August 1944, at the request of Monny de Boully, he sheltered Paul Éluard and Nusch Éluard, two French artists who were under investigation by the police for being part of the French Resistance.

At his bookstore, Scheler forged counterfeit documents to help members of the French Resistance. Due to the resistance efforts of Paul Éluard, Scheler's bookstore became a rallying point for the messengers of the Éditions de Minuit. Lucien Scheler signed the poems he entrusted in 1943 to Paul Éluard and Jean Lescure for L'Honneur des poètes under the pseudonyms of Jean Silence and Jean-Paul Mazurier. In 1944, the first issues of L'eternelle revue (an illegal magazine created by Paul Éluard with the help of Jean Lescure and Louis Parrot) were published in Scheler's bookshop, which first became available in June of that year. Along with being the author of several collections of poems, Scheler devoted himself to publishing the complete works of Jules Vallès in fifteen volumes, as well as those of Paul Éluard in two volumes, for the Bibliothèque de la Pléiade.

In December 2000, researchers searched through Scheler's publications to discover which ones were original. The list they came up with included Les Amies by Paul Delvaux, Les chevaux (1944) by Dubuffet, Paul Éluard (1952) by Valentine Hugo, Landscape of Ridgefield. New Jersey (1913) by Man Ray, as well as two paintings by Henri Michaux.

== Publications ==
=== Poems ===
- 1929: Évasions et Métamorphoses ou Robert Macaire dévoilé, Paris, Au vice impuni
- 1946: La Lampe tempête, with five drawings by Raoul Ubac, Paris, Éditions de Minuit
- 1958: Sillage intangible, with a dry point of Picasso, Paris, Le Degré 41
- 1963: Lisières du devenir, with six engravings on copper by Raoul Ubac, Paris, Jean Hugues
- 1973: Rémanences, Paris, E.F.R.
- 1977: Trois dont Calendarium, with four aquatints by Michel Richard, Les Arcs, Élisabeth Richard
- 1978: De Desiderio Patriae, with two etchings by Jean Cortot, Paris, Blaizot
- 1987: À nul autre que toi, with one lithograph by Jean Bazaine, Geneva, Jacques Quentin

=== Scholarly works ===
- 1957–1960: Lavoisier et la Révolution française, Paris, Éditions Hermann
- 1960: Le Comité central des vingt arrondissements de Paris d'après les papiers inédits de Constant Martin et les sources imprimées, in collaboration with Jean Dautry, Paris, Éditions sociales
- 1964: Lavoisier et le principe chimique, Paris, Pierre Seghers

== Sources ==
- 1982: Lucien Scheler, La Grande Espérance des poètes, 1940-1945, Paris, Temps actuels, 388 p. ISBN 2201015694
- 1985: Gerhard Landes, « L'Honneur des poètes », « Europe », Geschichte und gedichte, Zur Lyrik der Résistance, Focus Verlarg, Giessen, 162 p. [Interview with Jean Lescure, text in French, p. 135-148].
- 1995: François Lachenal, Éditions des Trois Collines, Genève-Paris, IMEC Éditions, Paris, 168 p. ISBN 2908295261
- 1988: Jean Lescure, Poésie et Liberté, Histoire de Messages, 1939-1946, Éditions de l’IMEC, Paris, 472 p. ISBN 2908295385.
- 2004: Archives des années noires. Artistes, écrivains et éditeurs, documents collected and présented by Claire Paulhan and Olivier Corpet, preface by Jérôme Prieur, Institut Mémoires de l'édition contemporaine, Paris, 144 p. ISBN 2908295717
- 2008: Les Lettres françaises and Les Étoiles dans la clandestinité, 1942-1944, presented by François Eychart and Georges Aillaud, Paris, Le Cherche midi, 284 p. ISBN 9782749112299
- 2009: Robert O. Paxton, Olivier Corpet and Claire Paulhan, Archives de la vie littéraire sous l'Occupation, À travers le désastre, Éditions Taillandier et les Éditions de l'IMEC, 448 p. ISBN 978-2-84734-585-8 (p. 233, 276 and 299)
