= Pierre Boujut =

French writer and poet

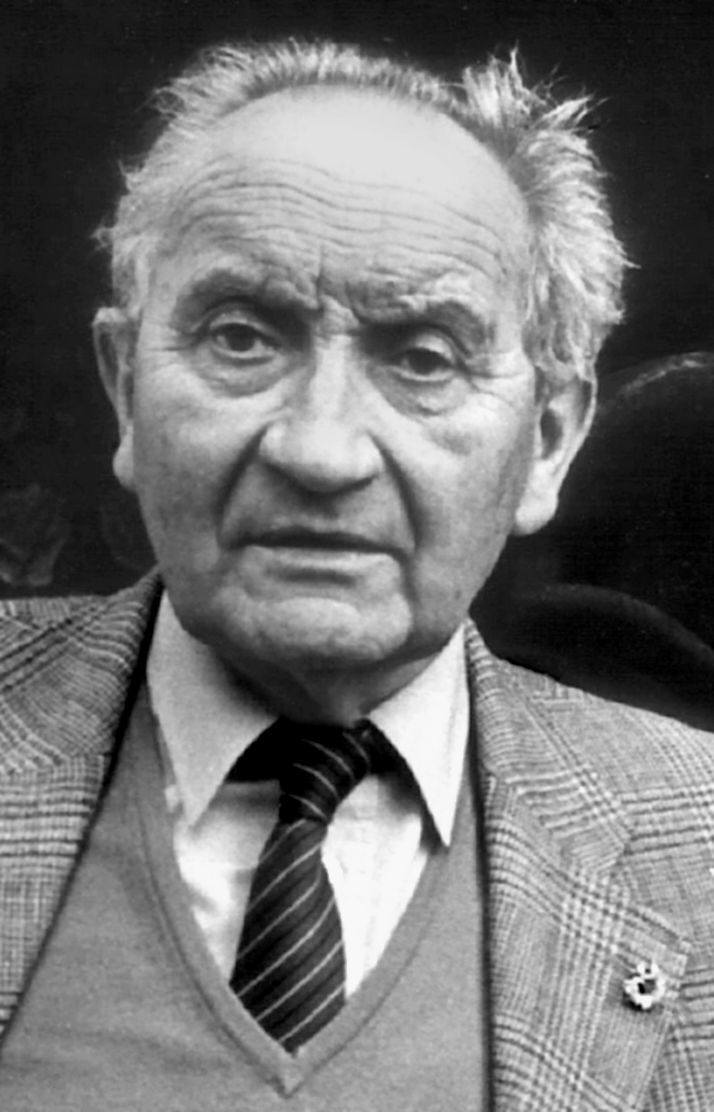
- Pierre Boujut in 1983
- Born: 27 February 1913; Jarnac, Charente, French Third Republic
- Died: 29 June 1992 (aged 79); Jarnac, France
- Occupations: Cooper and poet; director of La Tour de Feu, a poetry magazine published from 1946 to 1981.
- Writing career
- Genres: Poetry, Narrative, Essay

Pierre Boujut, born in 1913 and died in 1992 in Jarnac, Charente, was a French writer and poet. A cooper and iron merchant by trade, pacifist, and libertarian, he took up writing in his twenties, launching three successive magazines from 1933 onwards, including La Tour de Feu, founded in 1946. Alongside other poets, he expressed himself on both literary and political levels, mixing the two with enthusiasm, particularly when his son deserted during the Algerian War. Thanks to his poetry, Pierre Boujut maintained epistolary relations from his office in Jarnac with the great writers of the time. He continued to publish La Tour de Feu until 1981.

== The cooper-poet ==
Pierre Boujut was born into a Protestant family, which influenced his vocabulary, with the words “soul” and “spirit”, for example, recurring regularly in his writing. He defined himself as "a heretic within the Protestant heresy", and stated that: "It is religion that is ersatz poetry, not the other way around", an idea he often repeated in many forms. Another crucial factor was the untimely death of his father, who was killed in September 1914, at the start of World War I. This event may well have been at the root of his pacifism, which he never abandoned. He grew up alone with his mother, continued his secondary education at the Lycée de Cognac, passed his baccalauréat, and planned to become a teacher. At the age of twenty, he decided to learn his father's trade as a cooper and settle permanently in Jarnac. Six years later, World War II broke out. Despite his opinions, he joined his regiment in the face of the Nazi threat and lived through the French debacle of 1940. Imprisoned in Austria from 1940 to 1945, he drew lessons from this experience that reinforced his sense of fraternity, internationalism, and distaste for totalitarianism. Freed in 1945, he returned to his hometown, where he lived until he died in 1992.

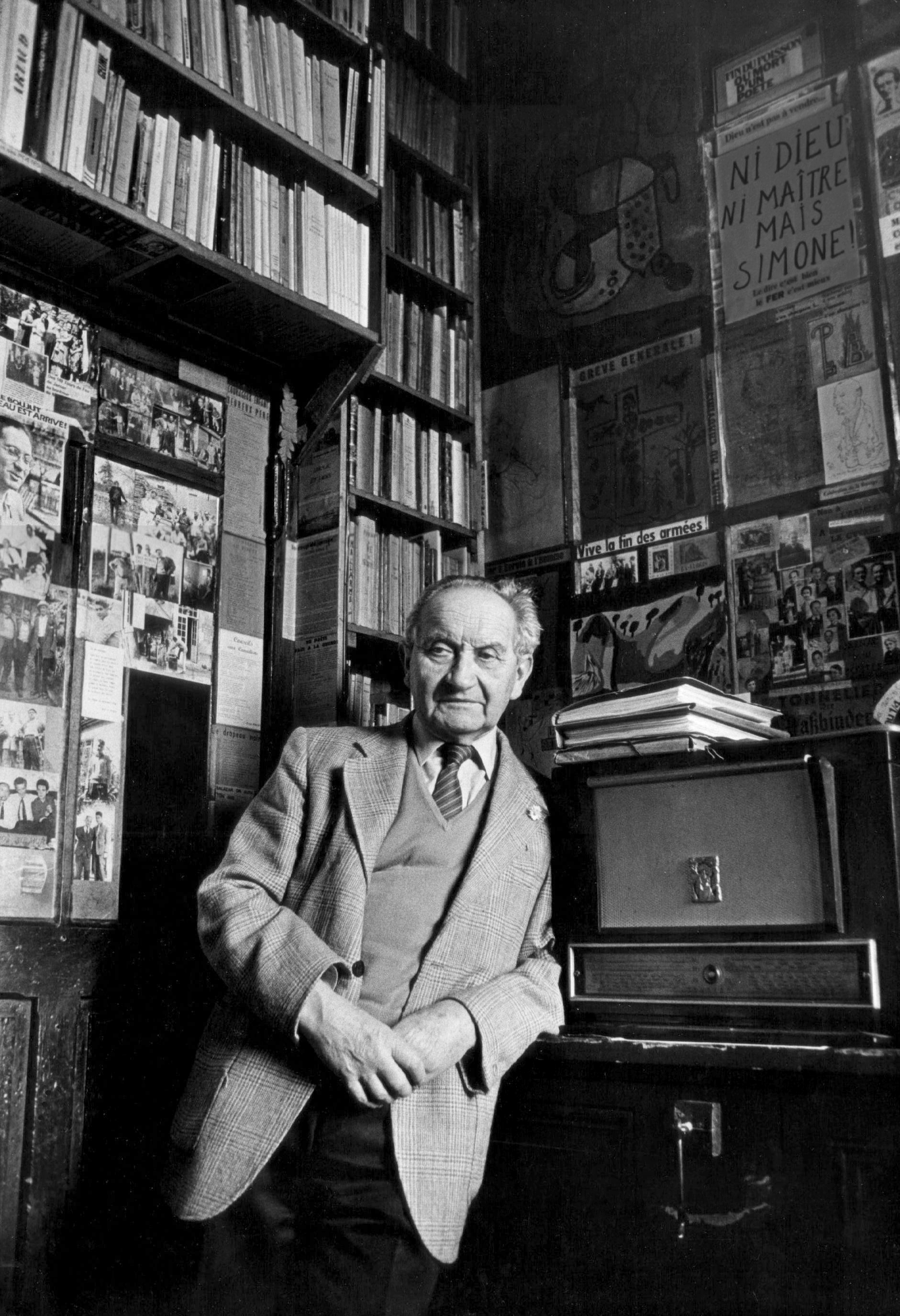
P. Boujut in his office in 1983.

In the 1930s, he founded two "literary journals of humanitarian humanism". Claude Roy, as a neighbor and friend, helped found the first, Reflets; the second, Regains, took its title from the work of Jean Giono.

Apart from his captivity in Austria and a few trips to Paris and abroad, Pierre Boujut spent his entire life in Jarnac. From his office, which became a tourist attraction over the years, he created successive issues of La Tour de Feu and corresponded with some of the best-known writers of his time. In his memoir published in 1989, he mentions André Breton, Georges Duhamel, Romain Rolland, Jean Giono, and Louis-Ferdinand Céline. In addition, he was friendly with Gaston Chaissac.

One of the most important dates in Pierre Boujut's life was 13 May 1961, the day his son Michel, then in the army, refused to take part in the Algerian War, fulfilling "all [his father's] thoughts". Michel celebrated the event with a poem, L'examen de passage, (Note: Reprinted in Les Mots sauvés, La Tour de Feu n° 96, December 1967, p. 58.) in which he unambiguously approved of desertion in wartime. Publication of the text in Louis Lecoin's newspaper Liberté led to the poet being arrested for a time. (Note: After his hunger strike in June 1962, a tribute was paid to him in December 1962 with La Tour de Feu no. 76: Reconnaissance à Louis Lecoin.) Years later, he would recall his admiration for his son's act of insubordination, who, having become a television producer, film critic, and writer, would recount his desertion in Le Jour où Gary Cooper est mort (The Day Gary Cooper Died).

Pierre Boujut's life was marked by the calm and regularity of a few rituals: the annual Tour de Feu convention on July 14, trips to Thouars to pick up the latest issue of the magazine from the printer, and vacations to Fouras to write his curiously seasonal poems. His life was characterized by a love of the margins that never allowed him to forget his desire to transform the world. Antimilitarist and libertarian socialist, he remained faithful to the line of conduct outlined in one of the poems of Mots sauvés: "Refuse any relationship with the official world". He stuck to it, and was able to write late in life: "I have known neither misery nor wealth. I have always lived in happy mediocrity and without the slightest jealousy". The only dark spot in this life, which constantly combined the apparent routine of the petit-bourgeois with the stances of the utopian and the inner flights of fancy of the great transparent that he also was: his bouts of depression. (Note: The expression is borrowed from André Breton, but diverted from the meaning given to it by the author of the Manifestes du surréalisme. P. Boujut explains this hijacking in issue n° 111 of his magazine, September 1971.) At more or less regular intervals, they robbed him of his optimism and energy, but he always came out of them a little more eager to write and to live.

From 1946 to 1981, his main literary activity was to compile and organize the summaries of the one hundred and twenty-eight issues of La Tour de Feu that he published and contributed to. Alongside his editorial duties, his work as a poet was marked by his warm personality, his concern for authenticity, and his unwavering ethical choices. In 1989, he published Un mauvais français, his most autobiographical book, in which his personal memories and poetic thoughts are interwoven.

== La Tour de Feu ==
At the Liberation, La Tour de Feu succeeded its two predecessors, Reflets and Regains, with issue no. 23, in other words, without interrupting the numbering system began in 1933. (Note: In this section, when references mention only the journal number, they are accompanied by the corresponding subtitle.) In the aftermath of an unprecedented conflict, the new "internationalist magazine of poetic creation" (Note: This sub-title was “infinitely important” to Pierre Boujut, La Tour de Feu (1991, p. 5).) delivered several messages of fraternity and hope in mankind. In this respect, the titles of the issues at the time are particularly explicit: Silence à la Violence (1947), Contre l'Esprit de Catastrophe (1948), and Droit de Survivre (1948). Thereafter, Pierre Boujut maintained, against dogma, dialectics, fascism, and scientism of all kinds, the long-standing notion of "living contradiction", a notion echoed in the philosophical work of Stéphane Lupasco. This led to numerous polemics and generally heated debates, notably at the informal Congrès of La Tour de Feu, held every year in mid-July in Jarnac, in the chai on rue Laporte-Bisquit and on the banks of the Charente.

The magazine bears the imprint of these debates and is the most important part of Pierre Boujut's work, even if some issues were conceived by others. Thanks to his work, the texts become clearer, respond to each other, and complement each other. There's no need to take seriously the burlesque slogan coined by the cooper-director to realize that he knew how to create, on a given date and from a wide variety of texts, a most homogeneous whole without betraying the intentions of the authors concerned.

Edmond Humeau, a libertarian and internationalist, was not content with committed texts and repeated attacks on dialectical thought. Similarly, Fernand Tourret built up a brief but highly original body of work, rooted in collective memory, from which he drew words that had been forgotten and charged with history. He used archaisms with a highly personal sense of language and a love of concreteness that cut across his experience, concerns, and extensive culture. (Note: Fernand Tourret is the author of L'outil, in collaboration with Paul Feller. Photos by Jean Boucher and Klaus Grunewald, Éditions Albert de Visscher, Brussels, 1969. Last revised edition, with photos by Philippe Schlienger: Epa/Hachette, 2004.)

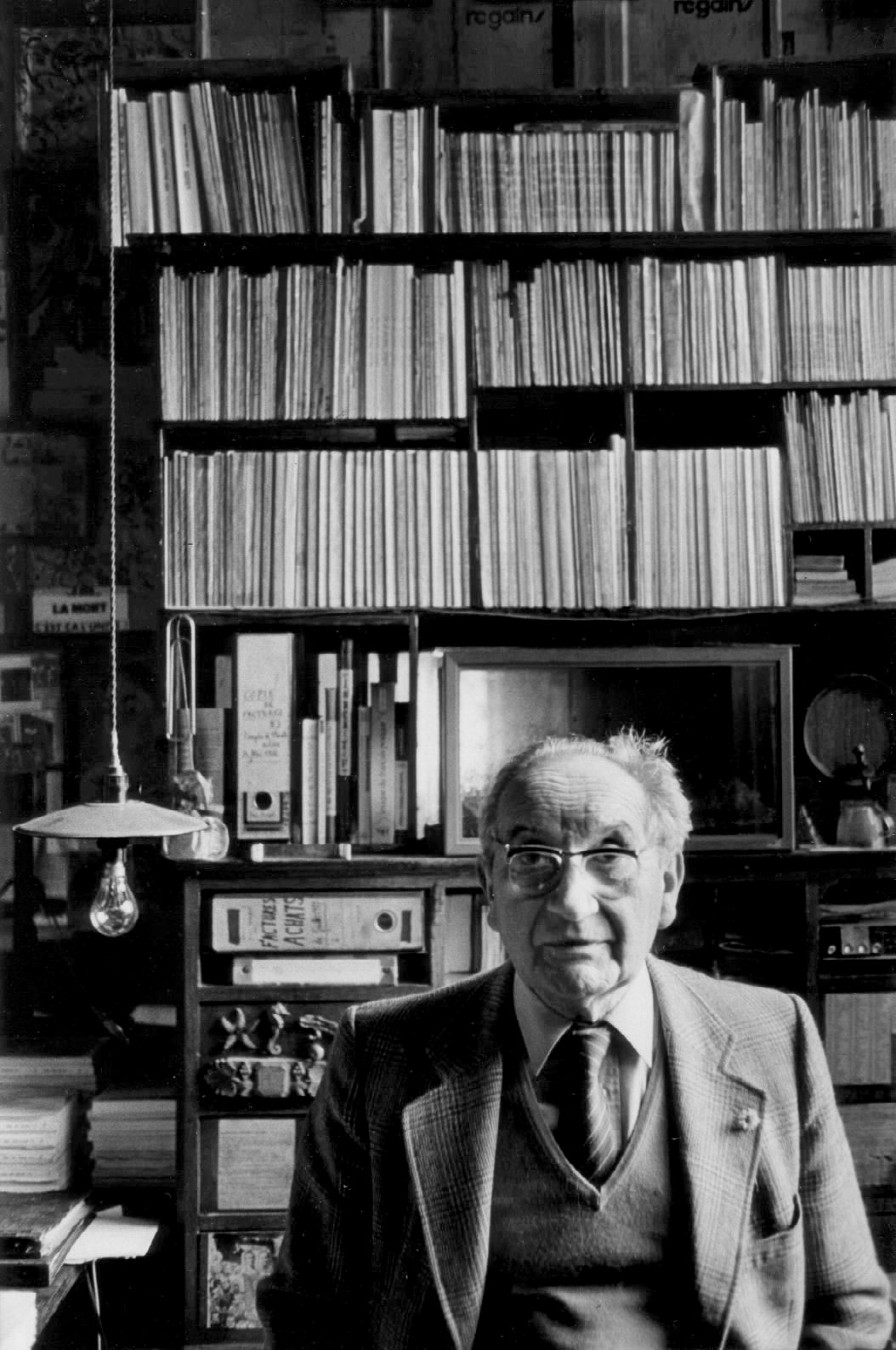
Another aspect of the office in 1983.

Finally, Adrian Miatlev was probably the most gifted of Pierre Boujut's friends. During his lifetime, he published unconvincingly with two major Parisian publishers, but his talent seemed to blossom with La Tour de Feu. He wrote poems with a pessimistic yet invigorating vision of life, marked by failure and great energy. Above all, he exchanged letters with his friends, characterized by verbal invention and an unrivaled sense of formula. His pronounced taste for paradoxes, blend words and motivated neologisms make his correspondence unique. His charismatic personality, and his death in 1964 at the age of 54, made him one of the magazine's myths.

In its day, La Tour de Feu praised its "great men" (Krishnamurti, Henry Miller, and Stéphane Lupasco). Certainly, three issues were devoted to Antonin Artaud and no less than nineteen to Adrian Miatlev's correspondence. For thirty-five years, nearly five hundred and fifty authors, from the most prominent to the most obscure, were published, while the editorial board was renewed over time.

Pierre Boujut never neglected his hometown or the Charente region. Two issues of the magazine were devoted to Jarnac et ses poètes and La gloria cognaçaise. In addition, other issues bore traces of their provincial origins. (Note: The theme of a cahier was generally defined and adopted at the annual congress, hence certain titles which in fact mask a more general reflection: L'Appel de Jarnac, n° 38, summer 1952, La Grammaire de Jarnac, n° 80, January 1963, Le Tarot de Jarnac, n° 121, March 1974.) This was no trace of chauvinism on the part of the Jarnac cooper, but rather a defiance of fashion and a refusal of Parisianism, a refusal explicitly formulated with L'alliance des villages and subsequently reaffirmed many times over. However, such a stance did not exclude authors living in Paris or the Île-de-France region: for a long time, they had a meeting place in the capital, where they met with varying frequency. (Note: There was the Saint-Claude on boulevard Saint-Germain, Chez Catherine near Place des Vosges, and Maurice Alezra's La Vieille Grille in the 5th arrondissement.)

In literary terms, and despite the strong poetic personalities of the members of the editorial board, La Tour de Feu did not invent new forms. While its poets took advantage of the advances made by Surrealism, albeit with some reservations, they fought just as hard against Isidore Isou's Lettrism as they did against the poet-linguists of 1960-1970. In other words, they made classic use of language, privileging certain of its possibilities (neologisms, revisited archaisms, annexation of the lexical fields of religion and morality). However, one of the original features of La Tour de Feu lies in the fact that it has maintained an incessant - because always contradictory - debate concerning the status of the poet in the world and his possibilities for action. (Note: And, more generally, that of the creator: Edmond Humeau and Fred Bourguignon, both painters, are on the editorial board. You can also consult, for example, issue no. 51, Révolution de l'infiguré, autumn 1956.) This debate, inseparable from a veritable creative profusion, allowed the expression of philosophical and political positions that were constantly debated. It nurtured the utopia of a fraternal humanity, free of all alienation, refusing to sacrifice the responsibility and freedom of each individual to a brighter tomorrow. Such a utopia, developed in the pages of the magazine, could only find expression, on the pain of disappearing as such, during the Jarnac Congresses. Yet, as Daniel Briolet has shown, the dream goal of those who developed it was to influence reality and the course of events.

A final peculiarity of La Tour de Feu: although it ceased to exist in March 1981, a N° 150 appeared in 1991. It allowed the survivors of the adventure to look back and its director to explain why he had interrupted the series begun fifty-eight years earlier. However, Pierre Boujut pointed out: "If La Tour de Feu has ceased to appear, it has not ceased to be".

== Influence and posterity ==
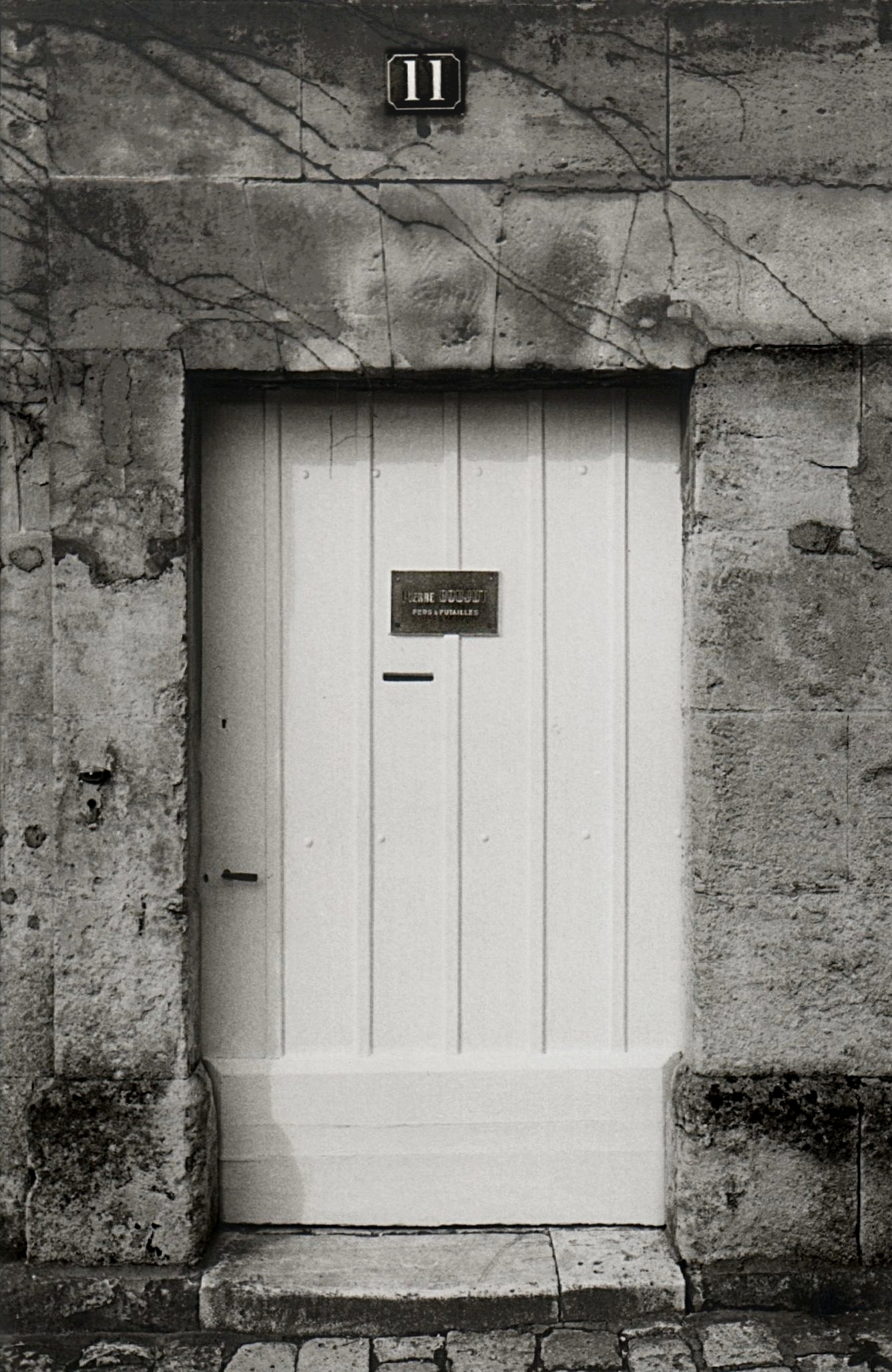
The entrance to 11, rue Laporte-Bisquit.

In 1970, Jean-Paul Louis arrived in Charente from Saint-Ouen to make contact with Pierre Boujut. He never left the region again, and the following year was joined by Edmond Thomas, who had left Paris, attracted in part by his knowledge of La Tour de Feu. They took up residence in Bassac and together continued to publish Plein Chant and Le Lérot rêveur. (Note: Both magazines already existed before their respective editors arrived in Bassac.) In 1973, Jean-Paul Louis moved to Tusson, where he continued his publishing work at Du Lérot. In 1979, Georges Monti stayed in Bassac before founding his own publishing house in Cognac: Le Temps qu'il fait, now based in Bazas (Gironde).

Jean-Pierre Moreau later joined Jean-Paul Louis and set up Éditions Séquences in Aigre. (Note: L'entreprise s'est ensuite installée à Rezé-lès-Nantes, en Loire-Atlantique, mais a depuis cessé ses activités.)

In 1982, La Nouvelle Tour de Feu saw the light of day under a different layout, and gradually, with other contributors, adopted a different spirit. “I handed over to my friend Michel Héroult”, writes Pierre Boujut in his memoirs. As if to confirm this handover, in 1988 the new director published a collection by his predecessor: Quatre clefs pour une serrure. After 1992, the new magazine "really took on its autonomy". Michel Héroult died on September 12, 2011, aged 73.

1991 saw the publication of a reference work: L'Histoire exemplaire d'une revue de poésie dans la province française: La Tour de Feu, revue internationaliste de création poétique (1946-1981). In addition to analyses by Daniel Briolet, then a professor at the University of Nantes, the book includes extracts from papers by Pierre Boujut, Roland Nadaus, and Edmond Humeau, presented at the 1987 international colloquium in Jarnac. (Note: The book also includes a list of back issues, as well as an index and black-and-white hors-texte photos.)

In 1996, the Association des Amis de Pierre Boujut et de La Tour de Feu was founded. Chaired successively by Daniel Briolet, Marianne, and Michel Boujut, (Note: Died May 29, 2011.) (Note: Granddaughter of Pierre and daughter of Michel Boujut, who died in a car accident in 2004.) (Note: Died in 2003.) this organization set up the "Espace poétique Pierre Boujut" at 11, rue Laporte-Bisquit in Jarnac, and subsequently published an annual bulletin, (Note: This newsletter will be published twelve times, between 1998 and 2011. No. 1 is entitled Les Mots sauvés, and subsequent issues are entitled Les Feux de la Tour.) (Note: Located in Pierre Boujut's house, this space housed the complete collection of the various magazines created by the poet, as well as numerous iconographic documents. It also contained classified correspondence and a large number of poetic and pacifist publications from 1930-1990, providing exceptional documentation on the unofficial literary history of this long period. A large part of these archives was transferred to IMEC, near Caen, in 2006 (see “Boujut Pierre (1913-1992)”, on imec-archives.com.) which featured many portraits - including those of Edmond Humeau, Pierre Chabert and Adrian Miatlev - and reprinted back issues of the original magazine. (Note: Among the back issues: n° 23 in 2004, n° 24/25 in 2005 and, in 2011, n° 47, Henry Miller ou les mauvaises fréquentations.) The association was dissolved in November 2011, following the death of its last president, Michel Boujut.

== Works ==
- Faire danser la vie, Feuillets de l'îlot, 1937
- Un temps pour rien, L'Oiseau-mouche, 1939
- Sang libre, Jeanne Saintier, 1947
- Le Poète majeur, La Tour de Feu, 1951
- Heureux comme les pierres (in collaboration with Pierre Chabert), La Tour de Feu, 1954
- La Vie sans recours, C.E.L.F., 1958 - Prix Voltaire. Reissued 1983, Éditions du Lérot
- Les mots sauvés, La Tour de Feu, 1967
- Célébration de la Barrique, Robert Morel, 1970, and Éditions du Lérot, 1983
- Nouveaux Proverbes, Rougerie, 1973
- Poèmes de l'imbécile heureux, La Tour de Feu, 1977
- Adrian Miatlev, (Note: Essay on the poet Adrian Miatlev and his work, followed by a biography by Madeleine Miatlev and Un poète dont le monde a besoin by Marcel Pinon.) coll. “Poètes d'aujourd'hui”, Seghers, 1987
- Quatre Clefs pour une serrure, La Nouvelle Tour de Feu, 1988
- Un mauvais Français. Arléa. 1989.

== Bibliography ==
- Briolet, Daniel (1991). L'Histoire exemplaire d'une revue de poésie dans la province française: La Tour de Feu, revue internationaliste de création poétique (1946-1981). Tusson: Du Lérot Éditeur. p. 312..
- "Une Tour de Feu exemplaire". La Tour de Feu (93). 1967.
- "L'Éternité retrouvée". La Tour de Feu (150). 1991.

=== Articles ===
- Briolet, Daniel (1988). "Pierre Boujut ou l'évidence poétique". La Nouvelle Tour de Feu (14): 65–77. ISSN 0294-4030.
- Briolet, Daniel; Louis, Jean-Paul; Thomas, Edmond (1993). "Dossier Pierre Boujut". Atlantiques, revue de l'OLPC (78): 3–9. ISSN 1159-3636.
- Briolet, Daniel (2001). "Réel et surréel en acte dans La Tour de Feu". Mélusine: 87–96.
- Cabanel, Patrick (2015). ""Pierre Boujut", in Patrick Cabanel and André Encrevé". Dictionnaire biographique des protestants français de 1787 à nos jours. ISBN 978-2846211901.
- Sabatier, Robert (1988). "III: Métamorphoses et modernité". Histoire de la poésie française: La poésie du vingtième siècle. Éditions Albin Michel. ISBN 978-2-226-03398-7.
