= Barbara Rosiek =

Polish novelist and poet (1959–2020)

Barbara Rosiek (25 June 1959 – 27 April 2020) was a Polish writer, poet and clinical psychologist.

== Early years ==
Rosiek was born in Częstochowa. She made her literary debut in 1985 with Pamiętnik Narkomanki (English: Diary of a drug addict), which she started aged 14 and finished while studying at university, describing her life of struggles with drug addiction.

== Career ==
Rosiek worked as a clinical psychologist in hospitals in Lubiniec and Częstochowa. She also worked with the Society of Friends of Families and Friends of Children Addicted but stopped working professionally for health reasons. In 1993 she became a member of the Krakow Polish Writers Union.

Rosiek's other books include Byłam schizofreniczką (English: I was schizophrenic), a record of her experiences with the condition, as well as some volumes of poetry. In 2002, the author was honoured for life with the Silver Medal of Cambridge.

== Publications ==
Novels

- Pamiętnik narkomanki (1985)
- Kokaina
- Byłam schizofreniczką
- Alkohol, prochy i ja
- W poszukiwaniu ducha (2007)
- Kokaina. Zwierzenia narkomanki
- Poganiacze Chleba (2008)
- Życie w hospicjum (2010)
- Oddział otwarty (2012)>
- Ja, ćpun

Poetry

- Byłam mistrzynią kamuflażu
- Jak ptak przytwierdzony do skały
- A imię jego Alemalem
- Wdowa
- Krzyk
- Miłość niedokończona
- Uwierzyć i Melancholia
- Żar miłości
- Ciało na kracie
- Być poetą
- Wiersze Wybrane

== Bibliography ==
- Polish bibliography 1988 - 2001
