= Julien Lanoë =

French industrialist and man of letters

- Born: 7 July 1904; Nantes, France
- Died: 7 June 1983 (aged 78); Nantes, France
- Education: Lycée Georges Clemenceau; HEC Paris
- Occupations: Industrialist and writer

Julien Lanoë (7 July 1904–7 June 1983) was a French industrialist and writer.

== Biography ==
Julien Lanoë was the son of Paul Lanoë (1873–1934), an industrialist in Nantes and a general councilor. He was also the grandson of Julien Lanoë (1841–1919), the mayor of Savenay, and Senator Henri Guérin. Additionally, he was the nephew of Georges Lanoë-Villène. Lanoë attended the Lycée Georges Clemenceau in Nantes, where he earned a bachelor's degree in philosophy in 1921 before joining HEC Paris. He later married Jacqueline Hamelin, the great-granddaughter of Minister Ferdinand Hamelin.

Lanoë entered his father’s iron business in Nantes in 1923 and succeeded him as the head of the Huet et Lanoë establishments in 1934. He became president and CEO of the Entrepôts métallurgiques de l'Ouest Lanoë et Adam in 1962.

In 1928, Lanoë published a novel with Grasset titled Vacances, which received a review by Catherine Pozzi in the Nouvelle Revue Française. He also founded the literary magazine La Ligne de cœur, which was active from 1925 to 1928 and again from 1933 to 1935.

In 1934, Lanoë succeeded his father as a member of the General Council of Loire-Atlantique for the canton of Rougé. From 1936 to 1970, Lanoë served as president of the Société des amis du musée des beaux-arts de Nantes. During his tenure, he organised exhibitions at the Nantes Museum of Fine Arts to promote contemporary art. He showcased artists from Nantes such as Maxime Maufra, Pierre Roy, Jean Gorin, and Camille Bryen, as well as local artists including Paul Deltombe, Michel Noury, Henry Leray, and Laure Martin.

In recognition of his contributions, a street in the Saint-Joseph de Porterie district of Nantes bears his name.
