= Lycée Gabriel Guist'hau =

High school in France

Coordinates: 47.2158°N 1.5686°W

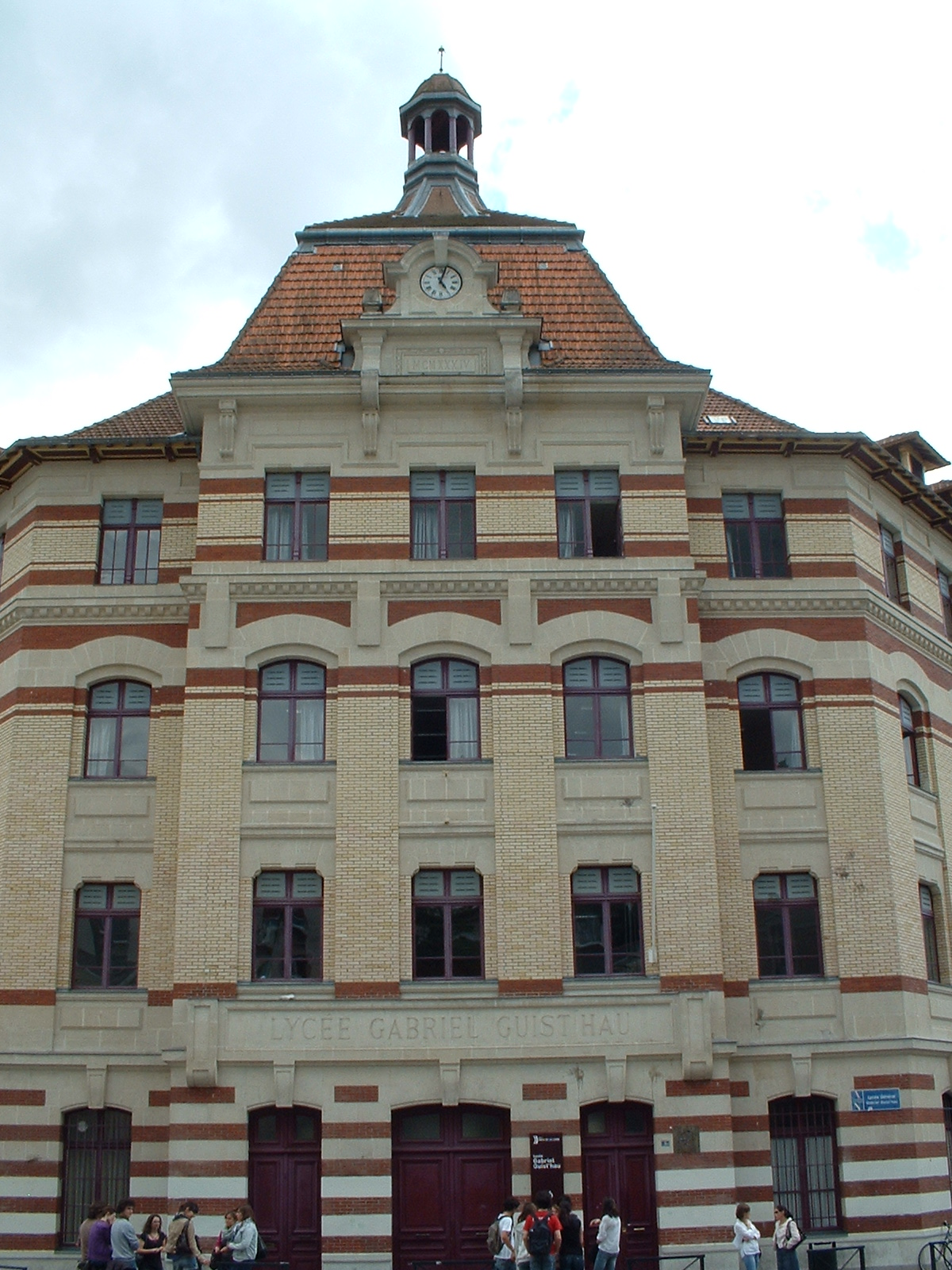
Entrance

Lycée Gabriel Guist'hau is a senior high school/sixth-form college in Nantes, Loire-Atlantique, France.

It was originally opened in October 1882 as a school for girls. It became coeducational in 1970.
