= Jean Todrani =

French poet and translator

- Born: 19 September 1922; Marseille, Bouches-du-Rhône, France
- Died: 14 July 2006 (aged 83); Marseille, Bouches-du-Rhône, France
- Occupations: Poet, translator

Jean Todrani (19 September 1922 – 14 July 2006) was a French poet and translator. He was the founder of Manteia, a literary journal.

== Early life ==
Jean Todrani was born on 19 September 1922 in Marseille, France.

== Career ==
Todrani published poetry in Les Cahiers du Sud, a literary review based in Marseille, from 1948 to 1966. He also published poetry in Cahiers GLM, another literary review.

Todrani was the founder of Manteia, a literary journal.

== Death ==
Todrani died on 14 July 2006.
