= Confessional poetry =

American movement in 20th-century poetry

Confessional poetry or "Confessionalism" is a style of poetry that emerged in the United States during the late 1950s and early 1960s. It is sometimes classified as a form of Postmodernism. It has been described as poetry of the personal or "I", focusing on extreme moments of individual experience, the psyche, and personal trauma, including previously and occasionally still taboo matters such as mental illness, sexuality, and suicide, often set in relation to broader social themes.

The confessional poet's engagement with personal experience has been explained by literary critics as an effort to distance oneself from the horrifying social realities of the twentieth century. Events like the Holocaust, the Cold War, and existential threat brought by the proliferation of nuclear weapons had made public matters daunting for both confessional poets and their readers. The confessional poets also worked in opposition to the idealization of domesticity in the 1950s, by revealing unhappiness in their own homes.

The school of "confessional poetry" was associated with poets who redefined American poetry in the 1950s and 1960s, including Robert Lowell, Sylvia Plath, John Berryman, Anne Sexton, and W. D. Snodgrass.

== Life Studies and the emergence of Confessionalism ==
In 1959 M. L. Rosenthal first used the term "confessional" in a review of Robert Lowell's Life Studies entitled "Poetry as Confession". Rosenthal differentiated the confessional approach from other modes of lyric poetry by way of its use of confidences that (Rosenthal said) went "beyond customary bounds of reticence or personal embarrassment". Rosenthal notes that in earlier tendencies towards the confessional, there was typically a "mask" that hid the poet's "actual face", and states that "Lowell removes the mask. His speaker is unequivocally himself, and it is hard not to think of Life Studies as a series of personal confidences, rather shameful, that one is honor-bound not to reveal". In a review of the book in The Kenyon Review, John Thompson wrote, "For these poems, the question of propriety no longer exists. They have made a conquest: what they have won is a major expansion of the territory of poetry."

There were however clear moves towards the "confessional" mode before the publication of Life Studies. Delmore Schwartz's confessional long poem Genesis had been published in 1943; and John Berryman had written a sonnet sequence in 1947 about an adulterous affair he'd had with a woman named Chris while he was married to his first wife, Eileen (but since publishing the sonnets would have revealed the affair to his wife, Berryman didn't actually publish the sequence, titled Berryman's Sonnets, until 1967, after he divorced from his first wife). Snodgrass' Heart's Needle, in which he writes about the aftermath of his divorce, also preceded Life Studies.

Life Studies was nonetheless the first book in the confessional mode that captured the reading public's attention and the first labeled "confessional." Most notably "confessional" were the poems in the final section of Life Studies in which Lowell alludes to his struggles with mental illness and his hospitalization at McLean's, a mental hospital in Massachusetts. Plath remarked upon the influence of these types of poems from Life Studies in an interview in which she stated, "I've been very excited by what I feel is the new breakthrough that came with, say, Robert Lowell's Life Studies, this intense breakthrough into very serious, very personal, emotional experience which I feel has been partly taboo. Robert Lowell's poems about his experience in a mental hospital, for example, interested me very much." A. Alvarez however considered that some poems in Life Studies "fail for appearing more compulsively concerned with the processes of psychoanalysis than with those of poetry" while conversely Michael Hofmann saw the verbal merit of Lowell's work only diminished by emphasis on "what I would call the C-word, 'Confessionalism'".

In a poetry class he taught at Boston University in the late 1950s, Lowell would go on to inspire confessional themes in the work of several prominent American poets. In 1955 Lowell requested a position at the university in part based on the suggestions of his psychiatrist, who advised Lowell to establish a routine in his life to help mitigate the effects of bipolar disorder. Lowell's class drew in a number of talented poets, including Anne Sexton and Sylvia Plath. Sexton joined the class in 1958, and working with Lowell proved pivotal in building her poetic voice. In 1958, Sylvia Plath would also join Lowell's course. After exposure to the personal topics in Lowell's and Sexton's poems, Plath was drawn to confessional themes herself and began including them in her own work.

== Further developments ==
Other key texts of the American "confessional" school of poetry include Plath's Ariel, Berryman's The Dream Songs, and Sexton's To Bedlam and Part Way Back, though Berryman himself rejected the label "with rage and contempt": "The word doesn't mean anything. I understand the confessional to be a place where you go and talk with a priest. I personally haven't been to confession since I was twelve years old". Another significant, if transitional figure was Adrienne Rich; while one of the most prominent, consciously "confessional" poets to emerge in the 1980s was Sharon Olds whose focus on taboo sexual subject matter built on the work of Ginsberg.

But some contemporary poets produce plural bodies of work that combine the confessional mode with other core aspects of their output; this absorption of the confessional into a larger, more diverse oeuvre comes under the umbrella of 'Poeclectics', whereby confessionalism becomes, for certain poets, just one important strand in a writing approach that deploys "all kinds of style, subject, voice, register and form".

== Influence ==
In the 1970s and 1980s many poets and writers, like Sharon Olds, Marie Howe, and Franz Wright, were strongly influenced by the precedent set by confessional poetry with its themes of taboo autobiographical experience, of the psyche and the self, and revelations of both childhood and adult traumas.

In an essay published in 1985 poet Stanley Kunitz wrote that Lowell's Life Studies was "perhaps the most influential book of modern verse since T. S. Eliot's The Waste Land."

Artists such as Peter Gabriel, Morrissey, and Madonna have all described Sexton as being influential to their work.

== Criticism ==
In a 1977 interview with The Paris Review, Richard Wilbur criticized confessional poetry, saying, "One of the jobs of poetry is to make the unbearable bearable, not by falsehood, but by clear, precise confrontation. Even the most cheerful poet has to cope with pain as part of the human lot; what he shouldn't do is to complain, and dwell on his personal mischance." Deep image poet Robert Bly made a similar criticism.

Some literary critics of Confessional poets have noticed a shared ambition among many of these writers to become celebrities. In concurrence with the proliferation of popular culture during the 1950s, confessionalism offered readers a detailed view of the writer's personal hardships, and in light of the considerable public attention which confessional poets received, the confessional movement is seen by some literary critics as a form of celebrity culture.

A literary movement called the language poets formed as a reaction against confessional poetry and took as their starting point the early modernist poetry composed by Gertrude Stein, William Carlos Williams, and Louis Zukofsky. Despite this, language poetry has been called an example of postmodernism in American poetry.

By far the most controversial reaction against confessional poetry is known as New Formalism, which argues for the return to rhymed, metrical, and narrative poetry. New formalism began during the 1970s and early 80s when younger poets from the Baby Boom Generation began to fight against the dominance of both free verse and confessional poetry. In 1981, New Formalist poet R. S. Gwynn published The Narcissiad, which literary critic Robert McPhillips later dubbed, "a Popean mock epic lambasting contemporary poets".

== See also ==
- Anne Stevenson
- Beat poetry
- Catullus
- Confessional writing
- James Merrill
- Limit-experience
- Poète maudit
- Persona poetry
- Sappho
- Theodore Roethke
