= Taner Baybars =

Taner Baybars (1936 – 20 January 2010), who also wrote under the name Timothy Bayliss, was a Cyprus-born British poet, translator and painter.

== Life ==
Baybars contributed to literary magazines in Cyprus and Turkey before moving to England in the 1950s, and adopting English as his literary language. A collection of his manuscripts is held at the University of Reading.

== Works ==
=== Poetry ===
- Mendelin Ucundakiler, 1954
- To catch a Falling Man, 1963
- Susila in the Autumn Woods, 1974
- Narcissus in a dry Pool, 1978
- Pregnant shadows, 1981

=== Prose ===
- A Trap for the Burglar, 1965
- Plucked in a far-off land: Images in Self-Biography, 1970

=== Translation ===
- Selected Poems by Nazim Hikmet. 1967
- The Moscow Symphony by Nazim Hikmet. 1970
- The Day Before Tomorrow by Nazim Hikmet. Oxford: Carcanet Press, 1971
- Don't go back to Kyrenia by Mehmet Yashin. 2000.
