= Philip Hobsbaum =

British teacher, poet, and critic (1932–2005)

- Born: Philip Dennis Hobsbaum; 29 June 1932; London, England
- Died: 28 June 2005 (aged 72)
- Education: Belle Vue Boys' Grammar School
- Alma mater: Downing College, Cambridge; University of Sheffield
- Occupations: Teacher; poet; critic

Philip Dennis Hobsbaum (29 June 1932 – 28 June 2005) was a British teacher, poet and critic.

== Life ==
Hobsbaum was born into a Polish Jewish family in London. His father was Joseph Hobsbaum (a telephone engineer) and his mother Rachel Hobsbaum (née Sapera). His cousin was the Marxist historian Eric Hobsbawm. He was brought up in Bradford, Yorkshire, where he attended Belle Vue Boys' Grammar School. He read English at Downing College, Cambridge, where he was taught and heavily influenced by F. R. Leavis. At Cambridge he took over the editing of the magazine delta from Peter Redgrove. After Cambridge, he worked as a school teacher in London from 1955 to 1959, where one of the pupils he inspired was Ken Livingstone. He then moved to Sheffield to study for a PhD under William Empson. In 1962, he took up an academic position at Queen's University, Belfast, and moved again in 1966, to take up a post in the University of Glasgow. He was awarded a personal chair in 1985, and retired from the university in 1997; he remained in Glasgow until his death in 2005.

=== The Group(s) ===
Hobsbaum's most direct impact on literature was as the animating force behind The Group, a sequence of writing workshops in Cambridge, London, Belfast and Glasgow, in turn. Although there was some slight overlap in personnel with The Movement, the various incarnations of the Group had a more concrete existence and a more practical focus.

The Cambridge Group was initially concerned with the oral performance of poetry, but soon turned into an exercise in practical criticism and mutual support for a network of poets. This Group relocated to London when Hobsbaum moved there in 1955, becoming The Group, and continuing until 1965, chaired by Edward Lucie-Smith after Hobsbaum's departure for Sheffield.

On arriving in Sheffield (c.1959–1962), he immediately organized the "Writers' Group" for the university's undergraduates and started Poetry from Sheffield, a magazine for their poetry but which also had poems by George MacBeth, Peter Redgrove and Francis Berry. He wrote about the group in The Times Literary Supplement, published on 14 April 1961. Barry Fox took over the chair when Hobsbaum left to concentrate on his thesis.

In Belfast (1962–1966), Hobsbaum organised a new weekly discussion group, which became known as The Belfast Group and included the emerging authors John Bond, Seamus Heaney, Michael Longley, Derek Mahon, Stewart Parker and Bernard MacLaverty.

In Glasgow, Hobsbaum became once again the nucleus of a group of new and distinctive authors, including Alasdair Gray, Liz Lochhead, James Kelman, Tom Leonard, Aonghas MacNeacail and Jeff Torrington. This group continued to meet until 1975, and unlike the previous groups developed a more pronounced focus on prose than on poetry. As an encore, Hobsbaum was instrumental in setting up, in 1995, the successful MLitt in creative writing at the University of Glasgow.

=== Work ===
Though he was a poet as well, it was as a critic that Hobsbaum was best known. Although as one of his obituarists noted, "[h]e was famously not a man who felt a pressing need to endear himself to students", he was a charismatic teacher, and fiercely committed to those with a commitment to literature. The dedication of Alasdair Gray's The Book of Prefaces is "to Philip Hobsbaum poet, critic and servant of servants of art". Seamus Heaney also dedicated the poem "Blackberry-Picking" (from Death of a Naturalist, 1966) to Philip Hobsbaum.

==== Poetry ====
- A Group Anthology (Oxford University Press, 1963), edited with Edward Lucie-Smith
- The Place's Fault, and other poems (Macmillan, 1964)
- Snapshots (Belfast: Festival Publications, 1967)
- In Retreat and Other Poems (Macmillan, 1966)
- Coming Out Fighting (Macmillan, 1969)
- Women and Animals (Macmillan, 1972)
- The Pattern of Poetry (1962)

==== Criticism and other academic writing ====
- Ten Elizabethan Poets (Longmans, 1969), editor
- A Theory of Communication (Macmillan, 1970), in US as Theory of Criticism (Indiana University Press, 1970)
- A Reader's Guide To Charles Dickens (Thames and Hudson, 1972)
- Tradition and Experiment in English Poetry (Macmillan, 1979)
- A Reader's Guide to D H Lawrence (Thames and Hudson, 1981)
- Essentials Of Literary Criticism (Thames and Hudson, 1983)
- A Reader's Guide to Robert Lowell (Thames and Hudson, 1988)
- William Wordsworth: Selected Poetry and Prose (Routledge, 1989), editor
- Channels of Communication: Papers from the Conference of Higher Education Teachers of English (Dept Eng Lit, University of Glasgow, 1992), edited by Hobsbaum, Paddy Lyons, and Jim McGhee
- Metre, Rhythm And Verse Form (Routledge, 1996)
- Entries in the Oxford Dictionary of National Biography for Peter Alexander, William Burnaby, Richard Thomas Church, Everard Guilpin, Alfred Noyes, (James) Stewart Parker, and William Stewart Rose (2004).
