= Tillie Olsen: A Heart in Action =

- Directed by: Ann Hershey
- Produced by: Ann Hershey
- Starring: Tillie Olsen
- Distributed by: Women Make Movies
- Release date: 2007
- Running time: 66 minutes
- Country: United States
- Language: English

Tillie Olsen: A Heart in Action is a 2007 documentary film directed and produced by Ann Hershey on the life and literary influence of Tillie Olsen, the U.S. writer best known for the books Tell Me a Riddle (1961) and Yonnondio: From the Thirties (1974). The film includes extensive interviews with Olsen and with prominent fans of her work, including writers Alice Walker and Florence Howe and feminist political leader Gloria Steinem.
