= Eileen Simpson =

American writer and psychotherapist

- Born: Eileen Patricia Mulligan; 1918; New York City, New York, US
- Died: October 21, 2002 (aged 83–84); New York City, New York, US
- Education: Hunter College, Princeton University
- Occupation: Writer
- Spouse(s): John Berryman (1942-1956); divorced Robert Simpson (1960-); Francis X. Baine (1989-)
- Writing career
- Notable work: Poets in Their Youth: A Memoir

Eileen Simpson (1918 – October 21, 2002) was an American writer and psychotherapist. Her 1982 book Poets in their Youth records her life with first husband John Berryman and his circle of poets, including Delmore Schwartz and Robert Lowell. In 1984 she was a recipient of a Guggenheim Fellowship for Creative Arts in General Nonfiction.

== Early life ==
Born Eileen Patricia Mulligan in New York City, Simpson's mother died when she was a small child and she and her sister were placed in a Catholic orphanage. Neglected by the nuns, she almost died of tuberculosis and, after their father died, she and her sister were sent by relatives to a preventorium in New Jersey. She struggled with undiagnosed dyslexia, a condition later identified by Berryman.

Simpson met Berryman at a New Year's party in New York in 1941, soon after her graduation from Hunter College, and they were married the following year at St. Patrick's Cathedral. The couple moved to Beacon Hill, and Berryman found work lecturing at Harvard, and later Princeton. Berryman, like other poets of his generation, would continue to earn his living through academic postings. Simpson meanwhile supported his poetry practice first with secretarial positions, and later, as a psychology student, with work at a Princeton clinic.

== Poets in Their Youth ==
Simpson's eleven years of marriage to Berryman were turbulent. As Berryman struggled as an artist, Simpson supported him practically and emotionally, even as his personal problems and behavior worsened. Simpson remained an astute and sympathetic observer of Berryman, his poet and writer colleagues, and their wives and families, including Randall Jarrell, Delmore Schwartz, Robert Lowell, Jean Stafford, and R.P. Blackmur, all of whom appear in Poets in Their Youth.

Simpson's Times obituary concludes that "madness and despondency were the principal motifs of her life" with Berryman and his circle. Between Berryman's alcoholism, infidelities, suicidal urges, and persistent self-destructive tendencies, Simpson was forced to conclude that "no amount of love and care could protect him from external circumstances, and that these could bring him to the edge of madness." After 11 years of marriage, she writes: "The job of net-holder had exhausted me."

Still, as the Washington Post reviewer Jonathan Yardley noted, it was a union characterized by "much happiness", and Simpson's enduring love and affection for Berryman, and the poets and poets' wives of their circle, are principal strengths of her memoir: a "cleareyed compassion... is characteristic of 'Poets in Their Youth,' which never sensationalizes these brilliant but wildly erratic young men, only seeks to understand them." While New Yorker poetry editor Howard Moss, writing in the New York Review of Books on the occasion of its publication, called it "too forgiving by far", Lee Siegel, reviewing its reissue in the New York Times, ascribes to the memoir "an almost uncanny clemency and a kind of cerulean objectivity", calling it "both a memorial to the men Simpson admired and an admonitory epitaph on lives lived at often false and ugly odds with their own aspirations toward truth and beauty."

Simpson left Berryman in 1953, divorcing officially in 1956. Berryman would go on to win the Pulitzer Prize for "The Dream Songs" in 1965, and eventually committed suicide in 1972. Simpson's memoir was published in 1982 by Random House, and reissued in 2014 by Farrar, Straus & Giroux. The title is taken from Wordsworth's "Resolution and Independence":

“We poets in our youth begin in gladness; / But thereof comes in the end despondency and madness”.

== Later life ==
In 1960, Eileen married Robert Simpson, a banker and diplomat, and relocated to Paris. Unable to continue her psychotherapist practice, she turned to writing, publishing a novel and two personal memoirs as well as studies in psychology. After the death of her second husband, she married Francis X. Baine, who died in the late 1990s.

== Works ==
- The Maze (novel). Simon and Schuster, 1975.
- Reversals: A Personal Account of Victory Over Dyslexia. Houghton Mifflin, 1979.
- Poets in Their Youth: A Memoir. Random House, 1982.
- Orphans, Real and Imaginary. Weidenfeld & Nicolson, 1987.
- Late Love: A Celebration of Marriage After 50. Peter Davison/Houghton Mifflin, 1994.
