= John Berryman =

American poet and scholar (1914–1972)

- Born: John Allyn Smith, Jr. October 25, 1914; McAlester, Oklahoma, U.S.
- Died: January 7, 1972 (aged 57); Minneapolis, Minnesota, U.S.
- Education: Columbia University (BA); Clare College, Cambridge (MA)
- Occupation: Poet
- Spouses: Eileen Simpson (m. 1942; div. 1956); Ann Levine (m. 1956; div. 1959); Kate Donahue (m. 1961)
- Relatives: Robert G. Shaver (great-grandfather)
- Writing career
- Period: 1942–1972
- Notable work: The Dream Songs
- Notable awards: National Book Award, Pulitzer Prize for Poetry, Bollingen Prize
- Literary movement: Confessional poetry

John Allyn McAlpin Berryman (born John Allyn Smith, Jr.; October 25, 1914 – January 7, 1972) was an American poet and scholar. He was a major figure in American poetry in the second half of the 20th century and is considered a key figure in the "confessional" school of poetry. His 77 Dream Songs (1964) won the 1965 Pulitzer Prize for Poetry.

== Life and career ==
John Berryman was born on October 25, 1914, in McAlester, Oklahoma. His great-grandfather was Confederate officer Robert G. Shaver. He lived in Oklahoma until he was 10 years old, when his father, John Smith, a banker, and his mother, Martha (also known as Peggy), a schoolteacher, moved to Florida. In 1926, in Clearwater, Florida, when Berryman was 11, his father shot and killed himself. Smith was jobless at the time, and he and Martha were filing for divorce. Berryman was haunted by his father's death for the rest of his life and wrote about his struggle to come to terms with it in his poetry.

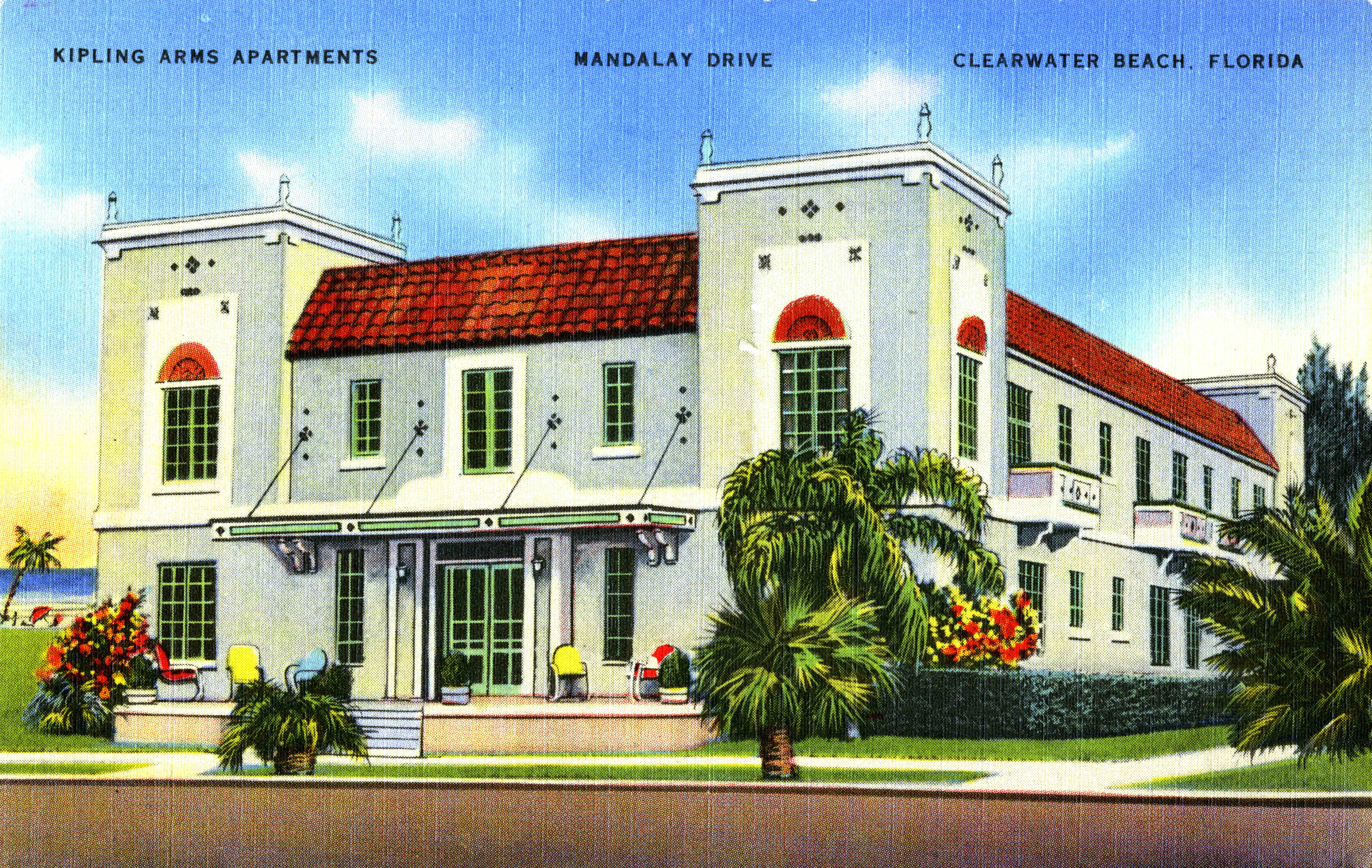
Kipling Arms Apartments, Mandalay Drive, Clearwater Beach, Florida

After his father's death at the rear entrance to Kipling Arms, where the Smiths rented an apartment, the poet's mother, within months, married John Angus McAlpin Berryman in New York City. The poet was renamed John Allyn McAlpin Berryman. Berryman's mother also changed her first name from Peggy to Jill. His stepfather later divorced his mother, but he and Berryman stayed on good terms. With both his mother and stepfather working, his mother decided to send him to the South Kent School, a private boarding school in Connecticut. At South Kent, Berryman was subjected to grueling disciplinary measures and was unpopular. He left at age 17 to attend Columbia College, where he was president of the Philolexian Society, joined the Boar's Head Society, edited The Columbia Review, and studied under the literary scholar and poet Mark Van Doren.

Berryman later credited Van Doren with sparking his interest in writing poetry seriously. He graduated from Columbia in 1936 and then studied overseas at Clare College, Cambridge, on a Kellett Fellowship, graduating from the University of Cambridge with a further degree in English in 1938. At Cambridge, he attended lectures by poets T. S. Eliot and W. H. Auden, and also met W. B. Yeats and Dylan Thomas. He returned to America in 1938 and struggled to get a professorship before Van Doren acted as a reference and secured him a position at Wayne State University. In 1940, he accepted a position as an instructor at Harvard University, where he befriended Robert Lowell and Delmore Schwartz. Some of his work appeared in Five Young American Poets, published by New Directions in 1940. One of the other young poets included in the book was Randall Jarrell.

Berryman published some of this early verse in his first book, Poems, in 1942. His first mature collection of poems, The Dispossessed, appeared six years later, published by William Sloane Associates. The book received largely negative reviews from poets like Jarrell, who wrote, in The Nation, that Berryman was "a complicated, nervous, and intelligent [poet]" whose work was too derivative of W. B. Yeats. Berryman later concurred with this assessment of his early work, saying, "I didn't want to be like Yeats; I wanted to be Yeats."

In October 1942, Berryman married Eileen Mulligan (later Simpson) in a ceremony at St. Patrick's Cathedral, with Van Doren as his best man. The couple moved to Beacon Hill, and Berryman lectured at Harvard. The marriage ended in 1953 (the divorce was formalized in 1956), when Simpson finally grew weary of Berryman's affairs and acting as "net-holder" during his self-destructive personal crises. Simpson memorialized her time with Berryman and his circle in her 1982 book Poets in Their Youth.

In 1947, Berryman started an affair with a married woman named Chris Haynes, documented in a long sonnet sequence that he refrained from publishing in part because that would have revealed the affair to his wife. He eventually published the work, Berryman's Sonnets, in 1967. It includes more than one hundred sonnets.

In 1950, Berryman published a biography of the fiction writer and poet Stephen Crane, whom he greatly admired. The book was followed by his next significant poem, Homage to Mistress Bradstreet (1956), a conversation with the 17th-century poet Anne Bradstreet which featured illustrations by the artist Ben Shahn and was Berryman's first poem to receive "national attention" and a positive response from critics. Edmund Wilson wrote that it was "the most distinguished long poem by an American since T. S. Eliot's The Waste Land." When Homage to Mistress Bradstreet and Other Poems was published in 1959, the poet Conrad Aiken praised the book's shorter poems, which he found superior to "Homage to Mistress Bradstreet".

Despite his third book of verse's relative success, Berryman's great poetic breakthrough was 77 Dream Songs (1964). It won the 1965 Pulitzer Prize for poetry and solidified Berryman's standing as one of the most important poets of the post-World War II generation that included Robert Lowell, Elizabeth Bishop, and Delmore Schwartz. Soon thereafter, the press began to give Berryman a great deal of attention, as did arts organizations and even the White House, which sent him an invitation to dine with President Lyndon B. Johnson (Berryman declined because he was in Ireland at the time). Berryman was elected a Fellow of the American Academy of Arts and Sciences in 1967, and that same year Life magazine ran a feature story on him. Also that year the newly created National Endowment for the Arts awarded him a $10,000 grant (when a Minneapolis reporter asked him about the award, he said he had never heard of the NEA before receiving it).

Berryman also continued to work on the "dream song" poems at a feverish pace and in 1968 published a second, significantly longer, volume, His Toy, His Dream, His Rest, which won the National Book Award for Poetry and the Bollingen Prize. The next year Berryman republished 77 Dreams Songs and His Toy, His Dream, His Rest as one book, The Dream Songs, in which the character Henry serves as Berryman's alter ego. In Love & Fame (1970), he dropped the mask of Henry to write more plainly about his life. Responses to the poems from critics and most of Berryman's peers ranged from tepid to hostile; the collection is now generally "considered a minor work". Henry reappeared in a couple of poems published in Delusions Etc. (1972), Berryman's last collection, which focused on his religious concerns and spiritual rebirth. The book was published posthumously and, like Love & Fame, is considered a minor work.

Berryman taught or lectured at a number of universities, including the University of Iowa (at the Writer's Workshop), Harvard University, Princeton University, the University of Cincinnati, the University of California, Berkeley, and the University of Minnesota, where he spent most of his career, except for his sabbatical year in 1962–63, when he taught at Brown University. Some of his illustrious students included W. D. Snodgrass, William Dickey, Donald Justice, Philip Levine, Robert Dana, Jane Cooper, Donald Finkel, and Henri Coulette. In a 2009 interview, Levine said Berryman took his class extremely seriously and that "he was entrancing ... magnetic and inspiring and very hard on [his students'] work ... [and] he was [also] the best teacher that I ever had". Berryman was fired from the University of Iowa after a fight with his landlord led to his being arrested, jailed overnight, and fined for disorderly conduct and public intoxication. His friend the poet Allen Tate helped him get the job at the University of Minnesota.

In 1962, Berryman worked on Dream Songs over a summer at the Bread Loaf Writers' Conference in Vermont, and in 1965 he received a Guggenheim Fellowship, the money from which he used to take his family to live in Ireland for a year.

== Personal life and death ==
Berryman was married three times. According to the editors of The Norton Anthology of Modern Poetry, he lived turbulently. During one of the many times he was hospitalized for alcohol abuse, in 1970, he experienced what he called "a sort of religious conversion". According to his biographer Paul Mariani, Berryman experienced "a sudden and radical shift from a belief in a transcendent God ... to a belief in a God who cared for the individual fates of human beings and who even interceded for them." Nevertheless, Berryman continued to abuse alcohol and struggle with depression, as he had throughout much of his life, and on the morning of January 7, 1972, he died by suicide, jumping from the Washington Avenue Bridge in Minneapolis onto the west bank of the Mississippi River.

Throughout his life, Berryman struggled with suicidal ideation and nervous breakdowns, documented by those close to him since at least his undergraduate years. He was known to have "habits of obsessive nocturnal study" and often struggled with insomnia. According to his poem "Drunks" in his 1970 collection Love & Fame, Berryman attempted suicide while enrolled at South Kent by lying on train tracks.

During his first marriage to Eileen Mulligan, the 1947 affair Berryman initiated with a colleague's wife was a galvanizing event in what became a lifelong struggle with alcoholism. Eileen left him in 1953, and he moved to the Chelsea Hotel, where Dylan Thomas was also living. Thomas soon collapsed from a bout of pneumonia and complications from alcoholism. When Thomas died a few days later at St. Vincent's Hotel, Berryman was the one to discover his body.

In 1954, one week after his divorce from Eileen was finalized, Berryman married Ann Levine, "a much younger woman he'd met in Minnesota." Within a few years of their marriage, Ann gave birth to a son named Paul, whom they nicknamed "Poo". Ann left him in the beginning of 1959, sending Berryman into an alcoholic spiral that caused an attack of DTs and put him in the Glenwood Hills Hospital ward for alcoholics.

In 1961, Berryman married Kate Donahue while he was teaching a semester at UC Berkeley. Donahue was a Catholic, and "herself the daughter of an alcoholic". Together they had two daughters, the first of whom, Martha, was born just a week after he was released from McLean's Hospital, where he was admitted against his will for erratic behavior, likely due to heavy drinking. Berryman visited Kate and their newborn in the hospital, then went to a bar. The taxi he took home ran over his foot and broke his ankle, causing him to be hospitalized yet again. In 1967, he was committed to the Grange Gorman mental hospital to detox; later, he was brought to the French Hospital when found vomiting blood; and in 1969 he was sent to Hazelden hospital with "acute symptoms of alcoholism." Hazelden employed the Minnesota Model for addicts, an early form of Alcoholics Anonymous's 12-step plan. Upon his release he stayed sober for 12 days before drinking again. He was readmitted in 1970. While going through these self-exposure-based sobriety programs, Berryman said his alcoholism was born out of guilt caused by infidelity to his first wife, and that in the years since he had experienced hallucinations, made sexual advances toward both his students and other men while drunk, once threatened to kill a student, abused barbiturates and tranquilizers, and experienced severe memory loss.

== Poetry ==
Berryman's poetry, which often revolves around the sordid details of his personal problems, is closely associated with the "confessional" poetry movement. In this sense, his poetry had much in common with the poetry of his friend Robert Lowell. The editors of The Norton Anthology of Modern Poetry note that "the influence of Yeats, Auden, Hopkins, Crane, and Pound on him was strong, and Berryman's own voice – by turns nerve-racked and sportive – took some time to be heard."

Berryman's first major work, in which he began to develop his own style, was Homage to Mistress Bradstreet. In the long, title poem, which first appeared in Partisan Review in 1953, Berryman addresses the 17th-century American poet Anne Bradstreet, combining her life history with his fantasies about her (and inserting himself into the poem). Joel Athey noted, "This difficult poem, a tribute to the Puritan poet of colonial America, took Berryman five years to complete and demanded much from the reader when it first appeared with no notes. The Times Literary Supplement hailed it as a path-breaking masterpiece; poet Robert Fitzgerald called it 'the poem of his generation.'" Edward Hirsch observed that "the 57 stanzas of Homage to Mistress Bradstreet combine the concentration of an extended lyric with the erudition and amplitude of a historical novel".

Berryman's major poetic breakthrough came after the first volume of The Dream Songs, 77 Dream Songs, in 1964. The dream song form consists of short, 18-line lyric poems in three stanzas. They are in free verse, with some stanzas containing irregular rhyme. 77 Dream Songs (and its sequel His Toy, His Dream, His Rest) centers on a character named Henry who bears a striking resemblance to Berryman, but Berryman was careful to make sure his readers realized that Henry was a fictional version of himself (or a literary alter ego). In an interview, Berryman said, "Henry does resemble me, and I resemble Henry; but on the other hand I am not Henry. You know, I pay income tax; Henry pays no income tax. And bats come over and they stall in my hair – and fuck them, I'm not Henry; Henry doesn't have any bats."

John Malcolm Brinnin, reviewing 77 Dream Songs in The New York Times, wrote that its "excellence calls for celebration". Robert Lowell wrote in The New York Review of Books, "At first the brain aches and freezes at so much darkness, disorder and oddness. After a while, the repeated situations and their racy jabber become more and more enjoyable, although even now I wouldn't trust myself to paraphrase accurately at least half the sections." In response to the perceived difficulty of the dream songs, in his 366th "Dream Song", Berryman facetiously wrote, "These Songs are not meant to be understood, you understand. / They are only meant to terrify & comfort".

In His Toy, His Dream, His Rest, many of the dream songs are elegies for Berryman's recently deceased poet friends, including Delmore Schwartz, Randall Jarrell, and Theodore Roethke. The volume contains four times as many poems as the previous one, and covers more subject matter. For instance, in addition to the elegies, Berryman writes about his trip to Ireland, as well as his own burgeoning literary fame.

Berryman's last two volumes of poetry, Love & Fame and Delusions, Etc., featured free-verse poems that were much more straightforward and less idiosyncratic than The Dream Songs. Before Love & Fame's publication, Berryman sent his manuscript to several peers for feedback, including the poets Adrienne Rich and Richard Wilbur, both of whom were disappointed with the poems, which they considered inferior to those of The Dream Songs. But some of Berryman's old friends and supporters, including Lowell, the novelist Saul Bellow, and the poet William Meredith, offered high praise for a number of the Love & Fame poems. Love & Fame and Delusions, Etc. were more openly "confessional" than Berryman's earlier verse, and also explored the nature of his spiritual rebirth in poems like "Eleven Addresses to the Lord" (which Lowell thought one of Berryman's best poems and "one of the great poems of the age") and "Certainty Before Lunch".

In 1977 John Haffenden published Henry's Fate & Other Poems, which included a selection of dream songs that Berryman wrote after His Toy, His Dream, His Rest but did not publish. According to Time magazine's review, "Posthumous selections of unpublished poetry should be viewed suspiciously. The dead poet may have had good aesthetic reasons for keeping some of his work to himself. Fortunately, Henry's Fate does not malign the memory of John Berryman".

Berryman's Collected Poems – 1937–1971, edited and introduced by Charles Thornbury, was published in 1989. Robert Giroux decided to omit The Dream Songs from the collection. In his review of the Collected Poems, Edward Hirsch said of this decision, "It is obviously practical to continue to publish the 385 dream songs separately, but reading the Collected Poems without them is a little like eating a seven-course meal without a main course." Hirsch also wrote that, "[Collected Poems features] a thorough nine-part introduction and a chronology as well as helpful appendixes that include Berryman's published prefaces, notes and dedications; a section of editor's notes, guidelines and procedures; and an account of the poems in their final stages of composition and publication."

In 2004, the Library of America published John Berryman: Selected Poems, edited by the poet Kevin Young. In Poetry magazine, David Orr wrote:

Young includes all the Greatest Hits [from Berryman's career] ... but there are also substantial excerpts from Berryman's Sonnets (the peculiar book that appeared after The Dream Songs, but was written long before) and Berryman's later, overtly religious poetry. Young argues that "if his middle, elegiac period ... is most in need of rediscovery, then these late poems are most in need of redemption." It's a good point. Although portions of Berryman's late work are sloppy and erratic, these poems help clarify the spiritual struggle that motivates and sustains his best writing.

After surveying Berryman's career and accomplishments, the editors of The Norton Anthology of Modern Poetry wrote, "What seems likely to survive of his poetry is its pungent and many-leveled portrait of a complex personality which, for all its eccentricity, stayed close to the center of the intellectual and emotional life of the mid-century and after."

== Fiction ==
Over several years while Berryman was in and out of treatment for alcoholism, he worked on a novel he tentatively titled Recovery. The manuscript follows Alan Severance, a "public intellectual, a Pulitzer Prize-winning Professor of Immunology" with obvious similarities to Berryman. The story follows Severance after his wife has him committed to a detox hospital ward, where he is made to go through the steps of recovery and examine his own illness and addiction. It records his interactions with other patients and counselors, the steps and terms of recovery, and his coming to terms with being an alcoholic. Berryman abandoned the book on page 224.

== In popular culture ==
- Berryman's ghost is a character in Thomas Disch's novel The Businessman: A Tale of Terror, published in 1984.
- Australian singer/songwriter Nick Cave has cited Berryman's influence on the composition of his 1992 album Henry's Dream, and also expressed his admiration overtly in the song "We Call Upon the Author" from the 2007 album Dig, Lazarus, Dig!!!
- Phish bassist Mike Gordon's side-project band has performed "Dream Song 22 – 'Of 1826'", releasing it on a live album, The Egg. Additionally, on March 30, 2014, their show featured a rendition of "The Poet's Final Instructions".
- On 14 January 1974 the Canadian Broadcasting Corporation aired The Hours of John Berryman, a 60-minute commentary on Berryman's "Opus Dei" (the 8-poem sequence that opens Delusions) by Canadian scholar and critic George Whalley. John Reeves produced the broadcast.
- The season finales of Succession's four seasons are named after phrases from "Dream Song 29": "Nobody Is Ever Missing", "This Is Not for Tears", "All the Bells Say", and "With Open Eyes".
- The song "Stuck Between Stations" by American rock band The Hold Steady heavily references Berryman and the circumstances of his death.
- Berryman is one of the alcoholic writers whose lives and works are explored in British writer Olivia Laing's 2013 book The Trip to Echo Spring: On Writers and Drinking. His career and struggles are compared and contrasted with those of F. Scott Fitzgerald, Ernest Hemingway, Tennessee Williams, John Cheever, and Raymond Carver.

== Bibliography ==
=== Poetry ===
- Poems (Norfolk, CT: New Directions Press, 1942).
- The Dispossessed (New York: William Sloan Associates, 1948).
- Homage to Mistress Bradstreet (New York: Farrar, Straus & Cudahy, 1956).
- 77 Dream Songs (New York: Farrar, Straus & Giroux, 1964).
- Berryman's Sonnets (New York: Farrar, Straus & Giroux, 1967).
- His Toy, His Dream His Rest (New York: Farrar, Straus & Giroux, 1968).
- The Dream Songs (New York: Farrar, Straus & Giroux, 1969).
- Love & Fame (New York: Farrar, Straus & Giroux, 1970).
- Delusions, Etc. of John Berryman (New York: Farrar, Straus & Giroux, 1972).
- Henry's Fate & Other Poems, 1967–1972 (New York: Farrar, Straus & Giroux, 1977).
- Collected Poems 1937–1971, ed. Charles Thornbury (New York: Farrar, Straus & Giroux, 1989).
- Selected Poems, ed. Kevin Young (New York: Library of America, 2004).
- The Heart Is Strange, ed. Daniel Swift (New York: Farrar, Straus & Giroux, 2014).

=== Prose ===
- Stephen Crane (New York: William Sloan Associates, 1950).
- The Freedom of the Poet (New York: Farrar, Straus & Giroux, 1976).
- Berryman's Shakespeare, ed. John Haffenden (New York: Farrar, Straus & Giroux, 1999).
- The Selected Letters of John Berryman, ed. Philip Coleman and Calista McRae (Cambridge, MA: The Belknap Press, 2020).
- Conversations with John Berryman, ed. Eric Hoffman (Jackson, MS: University Press of Mississippi, 2021).

=== Fiction ===
- Recovery (New York: Farrar, Straus & Giroux, 1973). Unfinished and published posthumously.
