= Tell Me a Riddle (film) =

1980 American drama film directed by Lee Grant

- Directed by: Lee Grant
- Written by: Joyce Eliason; Alev Lytle
- Produced by: Mindy Affrime; Rachel Lyon; Susan O'Connell
- Starring: Melvyn Douglas; Lila Kedrova; Brooke Adams; Peter Coyote; Zalman King
- Cinematography: Fred Murphy
- Edited by: Suzanne Pettit
- Music by: Shalom Sherman; Sheldon Shkolnik
- Distributed by: Filmways Pictures
- Release date: December 15, 1980
- Running time: 90 minutes
- Country: United States
- Language: English

Tell Me a Riddle is a 1980 American drama film directed by actress Lee Grant. The screenplay by Joyce Eliason and Alev Lytle is based on the 1961 O. Henry Award novella from Tillie Olsen's collection of short stories of the same name. Tell Me a Riddle was Grant's first film as director. Grant and Eliason would later collaborate on David Lynch's Mulholland Drive.

== Synopsis ==
Eva and David are an elderly, bitter Jewish emigre couple who raised children in poverty in the Midwestern United States. When David is told Eva is dying of cancer and must not know, he takes her on a journey to visit their children across the United States. In San Francisco, Eva draws inspiration from their exuberant granddaughter Jeannie, who lives life to the fullest despite any stumbling blocks it may toss in her path. To her she reveals the secrets of her soul and shares with her clippings and photos of the literary and philosophical greats – Walt Whitman and Émile Zola among them – who have sustained her in her bleak moments and offered her promise of a better life. As Eva comes to terms with her past, and David relives their years as revolutionaries, she and David manage to recapture the love they felt for each other early in their marriage.

The film was revolutionary in its creation and subsequent cultural impact. It was the first feature film in America to be written, produced and directed by women; the first women's film to raise more than $1 million and to receive major studio distribution, and it was the first woman-created film to screen during the Cannes Film Festival's "Directors' Fortnight". The film won Best Picture and Best Actor at the Edinburgh Film Festival and Best Actress Award at the Taormina Film Fest in Italy.

== Cast ==
- Melvyn Douglas as David
- Lila Kedrova as Eva
- Brooke Adams as Jeannie
- Peter Coyote as Young David
- Nora Heflin as Young Eva
- Zalman King as Paul
- Silo Sam as Mathew
- Ralph Chessé as Jacob

== Critical reception ==
In her review in The New York Times, Janet Maslin called the film "a slow, restrained, dignified effort...so straightforward and so simple that it doesn't prompt anything more elaborate than subjective reactions. If you bring the right sad baggage to it, you may be deeply moved; if you resent being manipulated, you may be moved in quite another direction. Throughout the film, plain competence and good intentions are on display, and at least in this case, they aren't qualities that make for strong responses. This may be a movie to remind you of something. But I don't think it's one to touch you on its own." Conversely Kenneth Turan hailed the film as a "special occasion."

== Legacy ==
In 2022 The Academy of Motion Picture Arts and Sciences and The Film Foundation collaborated on a restoration of Tell Me a Riddle with Grant's debut short The Stronger. These versions are distributed by Hope Runs High, which also re-released many of Grant's documentaries. Tell Me a Riddle and The Stronger premiered at the revivals section of the 2023 New York Film Festival. The film is now considered the first major American feature to be entirely written, produced, and directed by women.
