= In Dreams Begin Responsibilities =

1937 short story by Delmore Schwartz

"In Dreams Begin Responsibilities" is a short story by American poet and short story writer Delmore Schwartz. "In Dreams Begin Responsibilities" is widely regarded as one of Schwartz's finest stories and is frequently anthologized. Of all of Schwartz's stories, it is probably his best-known and most influential.

== Background and publishing history ==
Schwartz's biographer, James Atlas, wrote a thorough account of the story's genesis:

Schwartz wrote "In Dreams Begin Responsibilities" over a July weekend in 1935, when he was only twenty-one. A day later, his friend William Barrett appeared at the boarding house off Washington Square where Schwartz was living that summer and found the author ecstatic; he knew he had written a masterpiece, a verdict later confirmed by Vladimir Nabokov, who singled [the story] out as one of his "half a dozen favorites" in contemporary American literature.

The story was first published in 1937 in the first issue of Partisan Review. A year later it was published in Schwartz's first book of poems and stories which was also entitled In Dreams Begin Responsibilities. The title came from the Irish poet W. B. Yeats' 1914 volume of poems Responsibilities and Other Poems, which has an epigraph, "In dreams begins responsibility," attributed to "Old Play".

The story has been available in print since the author's death in two posthumously published collections of Schwartz's work, In Dreams Begin Responsibilities and Other Stories (1978) and Screeno: Stories and Poems (2004). In a 2003 review of In Dreams Begin Responsibilities and Other Stories that appeared in The Observer, Jason Cowley wrote, "[Schwartz] never wrote a finer story than 'Dreams'".

== Plot summary ==
The story tells of an unnamed young man who has a dream that he is in an old-fashioned movie theater in 1909. As he sits down to watch the film, he starts to realize that it is a motion picture documenting his parents' courtship. The black-and-white silent film is of very poor quality, and the camera is shaky, but nonetheless, he is engrossed. Soon the young man starts to get upset. He yells things at the screen, trying to influence the outcome of his parents' courtship, urging them not to marry because they will produce "children whose characters are monstrous". Other people in the audience begin to think he is crazy. Several times the character breaks down weeping. In the end he shouts at his parents when they are fighting and it appears they may break up, and he is dragged out of the theater by an usher who reprimands him. In the end, the character wakes up from his dream and notes that it is the snowy morning of his twenty-first birthday.
