= I Stand Here Ironing =

- Short story by Tillie Olsen
- Country: United States
- Language: English

Publication
- Published in: Pacific Spectator
- Publication date: 1956

"I Stand Here Ironing" is a short story by Tillie Olsen that first appeared in Pacific Spectator and Stanford Short Stories in 1956 under the title "Help Her to Believe". The story was republished in 1957 as "I Stand Here Ironing" in Best American Short Stories. The work was first collected in Tell Me a Riddle published by J. B. Lippincott & Co. in 1961.

Along with "Tell Me a Riddle" (1960), "I Stand Here Ironing" is by far the most reprinted and anthologized of Olsen's fictional work.

== Plot introduction ==
The story is told in a first-person confessional narrative. Presented as an "interior monologue" or an "imagined dialogue," the work incorporates autobiographical elements from Olsen's early adulthood to her middle-age.

The narrator is a working-class woman in her early forties who has five children, 3 daughters and 2 sons. At 19-year-of-age she had given birth to her first child, after which her husband abandoned them, coinciding with the onset of the Great Depression in the early 1930s.

Her narrative concentrates on recollections of raising Emily under these difficult circumstances. The hardships the young single mother endured to find work necessitated frequent absences from her daughter during her infancy and throughout her childhood. Emily was sent to her father's relatives for extended periods, as well as to a country convalescent home for children of indigent parents. These episodes are painful to the mother and particularly the daughter. The mother fervently hopes that her daughter, now an adult, will surmount her difficult childhood and achieve a measure of happiness.

== Characters ==
- Emily — A shy nineteen-year-old girl. She is the oldest of five children. Emily had a very difficult childhood, but has recently developed a talent for comedic acting. She is cynical about life and the world, despite her youth. She believes the atomic bomb will soon destroy everything, so there is no point in caring about anything.
- Emily's father — deserted the family so as to not "share poverty with them" less than one year after Emily's birth.
- Emily's mother — A mother who is filled with regrets and worries about her daughter. She worked hard to support her family and take care of them, but in retrospect, she realizes there are many things she would have done differently if she could.
- Emily's stepfather — called away to fight in World War II.
- Susan — the second child, golden and curly haired, chubby, quick, articulate and sure. By the time Susan was born, her mother had remarried and gained enough experience to show more affection than when Emily was born.
- Ronnie — the fifth child, a baby boy.

== Background ==
While attending a course taught by Arthur Foff at San Francisco State University in 1954, Olsen submitted an early draft of "I Stand Here Ironing." Foff was so impressed by the story that he encouraged Olsen—who was often preoccupied with providing for her young children—to cease attending his class and begin writing independently.

Biographers Mickey Pearlman and Abby H. P. Werlock describe Olsen's circumstances while writing "I Stand Here Ironing":

[Olsen] carried her writing with her on the bus, at work, at night, during and after housework: no wonder, she says, the "first work I considered publishable began: 'I stand here ironing.'"

Pearlman and Werlock add: "[D]espite the fact that she still had domestic responsibilities, she was able to spend three days a week writing—and then had to return to work where she took jobs at Kelly girl and Western Agency girl."

The story was first published in the Pacific Spectator and Stanford Short Stories in 1956 under the title "Help Her to Believe." In 1957, the work appeared in Best American Short Stories as "I Stand Here Ironing."

== Literary devices ==
=== Metaphor ===
One of the story's central metaphors is established in the opening line:

I stand here ironing, and what you asked me moves tormented back and forth with the iron.

As the narrator irons her daughter (Emily)'s dress, she is also "ironing out" her daughter's path and problems. The act of ironing signifies smoothness and thus her hope for Emily to have a smooth life; though she is prevented from taking steps to achieve this goal. The word "tormented" suggests her sense of guilt for her lack of attention and care devoted toward Emily, thus causing the various problems her daughter faces. Meanwhile, while recounting the past, she falls back on the act of ironing and other endless chores for her defense, suggesting that, though guilty for her shortcomings as a mother, she can do nothing about it due to her never-ending cycle of domestic duties.

On the domestic task of ironing clothing as a metaphor, Olsen offered this comparison: "written and rewritten and rewritten on the ironing board late at night...The very timbre, rhythm of the piece, the back and forth movement as the iron itself moves." Indeed, Olsen once, in "a slip of the tongue" referred to her story as "I Stand Here Writing."

== Theme ==
"Part of what Olsen shows in her writing is that to varying degrees, women wield power even in patriarchal society and are, therefore, partially responsible for shaping and misshaping the lives within that society."—Literary critic Mara Faulkner in Protest & Possibility in the Writing of Tillie Olsen (1993)

Biographers Mickey Pearlman and Abby H. P. Werlock declare the story to be "the most overtly autobiographical fiction Olsen has ever published..." Though "I Stand Here Ironing" comes the closest to autobiography of all her stories, the author-narrator is not a perfect equivalent to the character she presents. Literary critic Joanne S. Frye warns that such a parallel is "false and distracting...decidedly not the real issue."

The story was informed by Olsen's inability to write fiction while a teen-age single mother during the Great Depression through the post war years. Olsen enumerated the factors influencing the composition of the story, while she was still raising her younger daughters: "T]he writing time available to me; what is happening in my work and family life, and in the larger environment, in society."

According to literary critic Joanne S. Frye, the composition of "I Stand Here Ironing" was in part prompted by the 1945 Hiroshima and Nagasaki bombings and the subsequent Cold War threat of nuclear annihilation, from which Olsen grasped "the contrast between nurturing care and incomprehensible destruction," a dilemma which Frye terms "the anguish of parental responsibility in an unsupportive society."

== Sources ==
- Faulkner, Mara. 1993. Protest and Possibility in the Writing of Tillie Olsen. University Press of Virginia, Charlotteville and London. ISBN 0-8139-1417-5
- Frye, Joanne S. 1995. Tillie Olsen: A Study of the Short Fiction. Twayne Publishers, New York. ISBN 0-8057-0863-4
- Kelly, Joseph, ed. (2001). The Seagull Reader Stories. New York: W.W. Norton & Company, Inc.
- Leonard, John. 1994. Introduction to Tell Me a Riddle in Tell Me Riddle, Delta Books published by Dell, New York. ISBN 0-385-29010-1
- Mambrol, Nasrullah. 2020. "Analysis of Tillie Olsen's Stories". Literary Theory and Criticism, Literariness. https://literariness.org/2020/06/22/analysis-of-tillie-olsens-stories/ Retrieved 19 November 2023.
- Olsen, Tillie. 1961. Tell Me A Riddle. J. B. Lippincott & Co., Philadelphia. OCLC 748997729
- Pearlman, Mickey and Werlick, Abby H. P.. 1991. Tillie Olsen. Twayne Publishers, Boston, Mass. ISBN 0-8057-7632-X
