= The World Is a Wedding =

1948 short story by Delmore Schwartz

- Short story by Delmore Schwartz
- Language: English

Publication
- Published in: Partisan Review
- Publication date: March 1948

"The World Is a Wedding" is a short story by Delmore Schwartz.

== Bibliography ==
- Barrett, William (September 1, 1974). "Delmore: A 30's Friendship and Beyond". Commentary Magazine.
- Flanzbaum, Hilene (2015). "'The World Is Tref': Delmore Schwartz, Jews, Poets and the Crisis of the Middle Generation". Studies in American Jewish Literature (1981-). 34 (1): 117–133. doi:10.5325/studamerjewilite.34.1.0117. ISSN 0271-9274. JSTOR 10.5325/studamerjewilite.34.1.0117. S2CID 161635783.
- Flint, R. W. (1949). "Recent Fiction". The Hudson Review. 1 (4): 590–596. doi:10.2307/3847826. ISSN 0018-702X. JSTOR 3847826.
- Gornick, Vivian (June 2, 2015). "Delmore's Way". The Nation. ISSN 0027-8378.
- Haffenden, John (1980). "Delmore Schwartz: The American Auden". Journal of American Studies. 14 (1): 149–156. doi:10.1017/S0021875800001638. ISSN 0021-8758. JSTOR 27553792. S2CID 145564267.
- Howe, Irving (1949). "Tone in the Short Story". The Sewanee Review. 57 (1): 141–152. ISSN 0037-3052. JSTOR 27537894.
- Kapp, Isa (1949). "Familial Relations". The Kenyon Review. 11 (1): 162–164. ISSN 0163-075X. JSTOR 4333029.
- Rubinstein, Rachel (2004). "Schwartz, Delmore". In Kerbel, Sorrel (ed.). The Routledge Encyclopedia of Jewish Writers of the Twentieth Century. Routledge. ISBN 978-1-135-45607-8.
- Lehman, David; Brehm, John, eds. (April 3, 2006). "Paul Goodman". The Oxford Book of American Poetry. Oxford University Press. pp. 569–. ISBN 978-0-19-976997-1.
