= Ralph Chessé =

American artist, puppeteer (1900–1991)

- Born: Ralph Alexander Chessé; January 6, 1900; New Orleans, Louisiana, U.S.
- Died: March 17, 1991 (aged 91); Central Point, Oregon, U.S.
- Other name: Raphael Alexandre Chessé
- Education: School of the Art Institute of Chicago
- Occupations: Visual artist, puppeteer, stage actor, stage manager, makeup artist
- Known for: Painting, murals, printmaking, sculpture
- Spouse: Josephine T. Dupree (m. 1926–1977; her death)
- Children: 3
- Website: chessearts.com

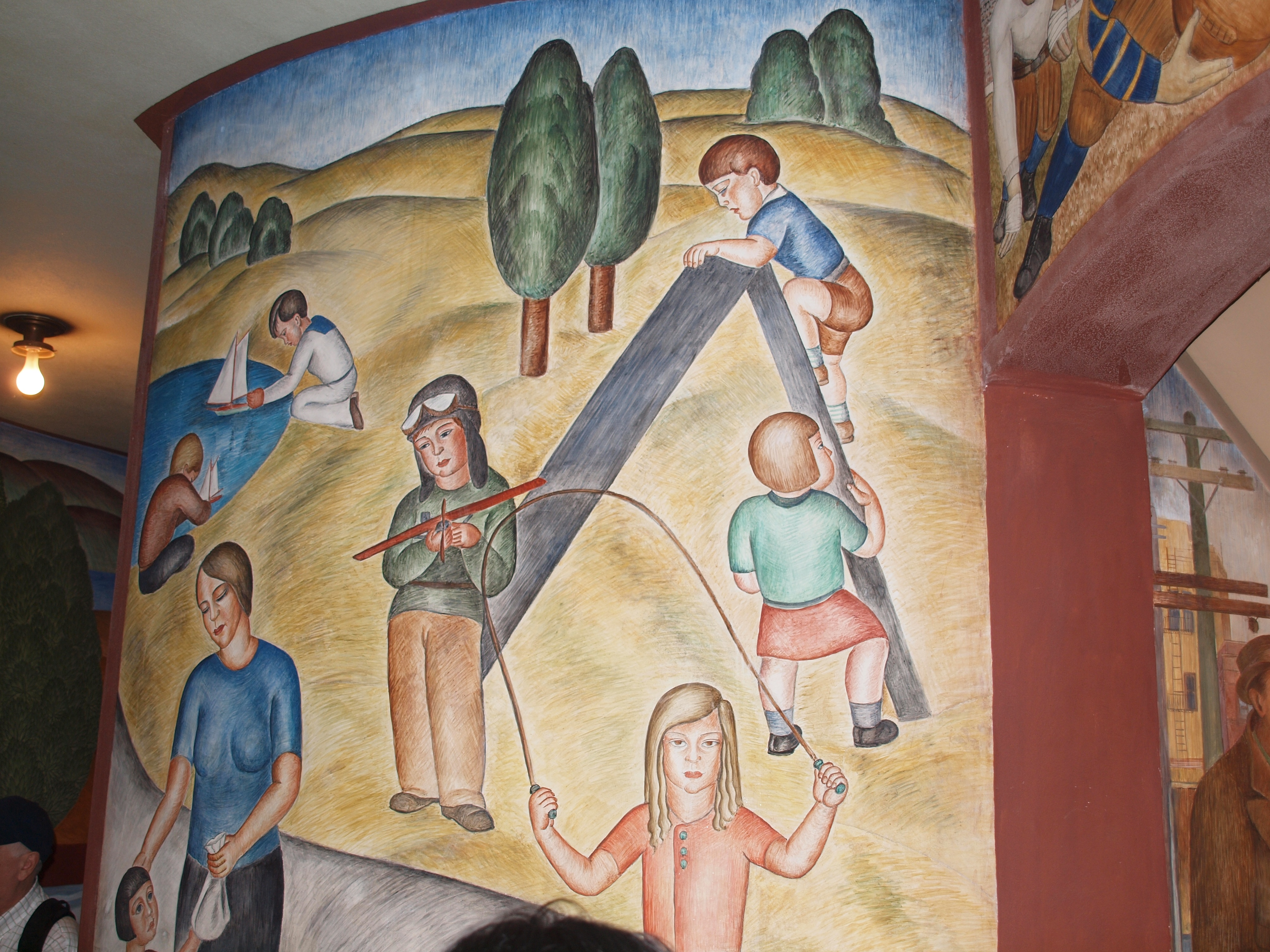
Children at Play (c. 1933), fresco mural by Chessé at Coit Tower in San Francisco

Ralph A. Chessé (January 6, 1900 – March 17, 1991) was an American multidisciplinary visual artist and performer. He was Louisiana Creole, and known as a puppeteer and painter; he also worked as a stage actor, stage manager, makeup artist, muralist, printmaker, and sculptor. He was one of the Coit Tower muralists in the 1930s, and worked for many years as a marionette theater owner and director.

== Early life, family, and education ==
Ralph Alexander Chessé was born on January 6, 1900, in New Orleans, Louisiana. His parents were Marie Henriette (née Ticoulet) and Alexander Laurent Chessé, and both were Louisiana Creole people. He was raised in New Orleans and Chicago. As a teenager he became interested in painting.

Chesse attended the School of the Art Institute of Chicago for a few months starting in 1918.

Chessé and Josephine "Jo" T. Dupree married in 1926 in New York City, and they had 3 children together. His two sons Dion Marcus Chessé (1929–1991), and Bruce Chessé (born 1935) also worked as artists, actors and teachers.

== Career ==
In 1919, Chessé moved back to New Orleans to work as an actor, makeup artist, and assistant stage manager at Le Petit Theatre du Vieux Carre. During this period he worked alongside designer Marc Antony. He began his career as a puppeteer and painter in 1920.

In 1923, Chessé moved to Hollywood with a goal of working in the motion picture industry, and he remained for one year as he worked at United Artists as a timekeeper. In 1924, he moved to San Francisco and was introduced to marionette theatre, and furthered his understanding of puppetry with artist James Blanding Sloan.

Chessé opened the Marionette Theater in San Francisco, where he designed all of the marionettes, as well as the stage sets, the lighting, and he performing the acting; the first show was Hamlet (1927). In 1931, he opened the a new marionette theater at 718 Montgomery Street in San Francisco. He continued performing marionette theater performances throughout the 1970s.

During the 1930s, Chessé worked as the marionettes director for Federal Theatre Project, as part of the New Deal. Additionally he painted the 9 feet (2.7 m) x 6 feet (1.8 m) fresco, Children at Play (c. 1933), at Coit Tower in San Francisco, depicting multiple children playing on a playground. This fresco was a Public Works of Art Project (PWAP), another New Deal program.

In 1939, Chessé performed puppetry shows at the Golden Gate International Exposition (GGIE) on Treasure Island. During World War II, he continued to make art and worked as a shipbuilder at Marinship in Sausalito, California. He had an exhibition in 1944 of his oil paintings in Moscow.

Chessé created the KPIX-TV children’s television program, The Wonderful World of Brother Buzz (1953–1969).

He had a small acting role as Jacob in the film Tell Me a Riddle (1980), directed by Lee Grant. In 1984, Chessé moved to Ashland, Oregon for retirement. He continued exhibiting his paintings in Oregon after his move.

== Late life, death and legacy ==
Prior to his death, he suffered from multiple strokes and a heart attack. Chessé died on March 17, 1991, in Central Point, Oregon.

Chessé's work can be found in museum collections, including at the National Gallery of Art in Washington, D.C.; the Metropolitan Museum of Art in New York City; the Museum of Modern Art (MoMA) in New York City; and the Portland Art Museum in Oregon.

He has had multiple posthumous exhibitions, including at the Georgia Museum of Art (2015) in Athens, Georgia curated by Laura Valeri.

== Exhibitions ==
=== Solo exhibitions ===
- The Work of Ralph Chessé (1900–1991) (2015), solo exhibition, Georgia Museum of Art, Athens, Georgia
- Ralph Chessé: A San Francisco Century (2024), solo exhibition, Jewett Gallery at San Francisco Public Library (main branch), San Francisco, California

=== Group exhibitions ===
- California Garden and Home Exposition (1968), Oakland Coliseum, Oakland, California
- Works of Daniel Robinson, Ralph Chesse, Nelson Sandgren, Al Pearson, Richard Kennedy, and Hal Johnson (2001) ArtSpace Gallery, Astoria, Oregon
- Constructing Identity (2017), group exhibition, Portland Art Museum, Portland, Oregon
- Black Artists of Oregon (2023–2024), group exhibition, Portland Art Museum, Portland, Oregon

== Publications ==
- Chesse, Ralph (May 4, 1987). The Marionette Actor. Bloomsbury Academic. ISBN 978-0-8026-0011-0.
