= Alev Croutier =

Turkish-American writer

- Born: Alev Lytle Croutier; 1945 (age 80–81); İzmir, Turkey
- Education: Robert College, Oberlin College
- Occupation: writer
- Known for: co-founder, Mercury House publishers
- Awards: National Women’s Political Caucus, McGrew Hill Film award, Daughters of Atatürk 2000 Women of Distinction Award, American Turkish Council cultural award,, Rotary Exceptional Achievement Award

Alev Lytle Croutier, known in Turkey as "Alev Aksoy Croutier" (born 1945 in İzmir, Turkey), is a writer based in San Francisco, US. Her books have been translated into 22 languages. She is the author of the non-fiction books Harem: the World behind the Veil and Taking the Waters, and the novels The Palace of Tears, Seven Houses, and The Third Woman.

== Career ==
Croutier studied Comparative Literature at Robert College in Istanbul, and left Turkey at the age of 18 to study Art History at Oberlin College in the US. She has taught at Dartmouth, Goddard, and San Francisco State University, and lectures at universities, museums, libraries, and conferences on Orientalism, Middle Eastern women, harems, and Turkey.

Croutier co-founded Mercury House publishing company in San Francisco in 1986 and worked as the executive editor for almost a decade.

=== Film ===
Before becoming a writer, Croutier was a screenwriter and documentary filmmaker in Japan, Turkey, Europe, and the US, and was awarded a Guggenheim Fellowship for the screenplay to the 1980 film Tell Me a Riddle based on Tillie Olsen's novella.

=== Writing ===
Her articles have appeared in literary and mainstream magazines, such as Art & Antiques, Harper’s, London Telegraph, New York Times, San Francisco Chronicle, Gourmet, Le Monde, Die Woche, Focus, and Zyzzyva, as well as anthologies including Roots & Branches, Istanbul, I Should Have Stayed Home, and Food. She contributed to A Window over the Mediterranean for the 2001 G8 summit in Genoa among writers such as Amos Oz, Tahar Ben Jelloun, Max Gallo, Amin Malouf, and Luis Sepulveda.

=== Media ===
Croutier has appeared in radio and TV shows. She was a commentator for the Canadian Film Board series The Powder Room, the BBC's Mozart in Turkey, and Channel 4's The Reign of Women, and Harem.

=== Awards ===
She has received the National Women's Political Caucus, the McGrew Hill Film award, the Daughters of Atatürk 2000 Women of Distinction Award, the American Turkish Council cultural award, and the Rotary Exceptional Achievement Award.

== Books ==
Croutier's first non-fiction book, Harem: The World Behind the Veil, was published by Abbeville Press in 1989. Croutier's own grandmother grew up in a Turkish harem in Macedonia. The New York Times said "this is a serious history, yet an immensely readable one," while the LA Times wrote: “This book is like a marvelous box of expensive chocolates, or rather, perfumed Turkish Delight.” And the Boston Globe: “A book of breathtaking beauty, written in an ingratiating prose.”

Her second non-fiction book, Taking the Waters: Spirit, Art, Sensuality, published in 1992 by Abbeville, was an exploration of mythological, therapeutic, social, and aesthetic aspects of water.

Seven Houses, her second novel, took seven years to write and was published in 2002 to comparisons with Gabriel García Márquez, Carlos Fuentes, and Isabel Allende. Allende praised Croutier for "braiding history and fiction in an intricate pattern", although the Washington Post noted an "occasional heavy-handedness with pop culture and historical figures." The San Francisco Chronicle said her "measured prose is artistic and sensuous."

Her novel for young readers, Leyla: The Black Tulip, was published in 2003 as part of the American Girl series along with a historical Turkish doll produced by Mattel.
