= The Dream Songs =

1969 poetry collection by John Berryman

- Author: John Berryman
- Language: English
- Genre: American poetry, confessional poetry
- Publisher: Farrar, Straus & Giroux
- Publication date: 1969
- Publication place: United States

The Dream Songs is a compilation of two books of poetry, 77 Dream Songs (1964) and His Toy, His Dream, His Rest (1968), by the American poet John Berryman. According to Berryman's "Note" to The Dream Songs, "This volume combines 77 Dream Songs and His Toy, His Dream, His Rest, comprising Books I through VII of a poem whose working title, since 1955, has been The Dream Songs." In total, the work consists of 385 individual poems.

The book is listed by the Academy of American Poets as one of its "Classic Books of American Poetry". The Norton Anthology of Modern Poetry calls The Dream Songs Berryman's "major work" and says the poems "form, like his friend Robert Lowell's Notebook, a poetic journal, and represent, half phantasmagorically, the changes in Berryman's mood and attitude."

The dream song form consists of three stanzas, divided into six lines per stanza. The poems are in free verse with irregular rhyme schemes. The songs are all numbered but only some have individual titles.

== Main characters ==
The work follows the travails of a character named Henry, who bears a striking resemblance to Berryman. But according to The Norton Anthology of Modern Poetry:

When the first volume, 77 Dream Songs, was misinterpreted as simple autobiography, Berryman wrote in a prefatory note to the sequel, "The poem then, whatever its cast of characters, is essentially about an imaginary character (not the poet, not me) named Henry, a white American in early middle age sometimes in blackface, who has suffered an irreversible loss and talks about himself sometimes in the first person, sometimes in the third, sometimes even in the second; he has a friend, never named, who addresses him as Mr Bones and variants thereof."

In other statements about Henry's identity, Berryman is less strict about the difference, saying in an interview, "Henry does resemble me, and I resemble Henry; but on the other hand I am not Henry. You know, I pay income tax; Henry pays no income tax. And bats come over and they stall in my hair—and fuck them, I'm not Henry; Henry doesn't have any bats."

Berryman read some Dream Songs in an event at the Solomon R. Guggenheim Museum with Robert Lowell in 1963. Some audio survives. Of Henry, he wrote: "People don't like him, and he doesn't like himself. In fact, he doesn't even know what his name is. His name at one point seems to be Henry House, and at another point it seems to be Henry Pussycat. . .He [also] has a 'friend' who calls him Mr. Bones, and I use friend in quotation marks because this is one of the most hostile friends who ever lived." Controversially, this unnamed friend speaks in a Southern, black dialect and in "blackface", as Berryman indicates, suggesting a kind of literary minstrelsy.

Kevin Young, an African-American poet who edited a Selected Poems of Berryman for Library of America, commented on this issue:

[Berryman's] use of "black dialect" is frustrating and even offensive at times, as many have noted, and deserves examination at length. Nonetheless, the poems are, in part, about an American light that is not as pure as we may wish; or whose purity may rely not just on success (the dream) but on failure (the song). . .In turn, the poems are not a song of "myself" but a song of multiple selves. Instead of a cult of personality, we have a clash of personalities—the poems' protagonist Henry speaks not just as "I" but as "he," "we," and "you". . .Berryman relied on the shifting form to explain in part his disparate personalities. . .The voice shifts from high to low, from archaic language to slang, slant rhyme to full, attempting to render something of jazz or, more accurately, the blues—devil's music. What emerges and succeeds is something of a sonnet plus some—a devil's sonnet, say (the three sixes stanzas too obvious to be ignored). Berryman's heresy is against the polite modernism that preceded him. That the poem can let in all sorts of Americanisms—not just Greek, as Eliot would have it—and not as signs of culture's decay, but of its American vitality, is fearless and liberating.

== 77 Dream Songs ==
This volume was awarded the 1965 Pulitzer Prize for Poetry. The Academy of American Poets wrote, "the poems of 77 Dream Songs are characterized by their unusual syntax, mix of high and low diction, and virtuosic language. Commonly anthologized dream songs [from this volume] include 'Filling her compact & delicious body,' 'Henry sats,' 'I’m scared a lonely,' and 'Henry’s Confession.'"

These poems establish Henry as an alienated, self-loathing, and self-conscious character. Berryman also establishes some of the themes that continue to trouble Henry in later dream songs (like his troubles with women and his obsession with death and suicide). Berryman references his father's suicide as "a thing on Henry's heart/ so heavy, if he had a hundred years/ & more, & weeping, sleepless, in all them time/ Henry could not make good." This also addresses Henry's struggle with depression.

In an interview with Al Alvarez in 1966, after the publication of 77 Dream Songs, Berryman compared his treatment of Henry with Leo Tolstoy's treatment of Anna Karenina, saying, "I took Henry in various directions: the direction of despair, of lust, of memory, of patriotism . . .to take him further than [anywhere] an ordinary life can take us."

The book received favorable reviews. One particularly glowing review came from John Malcolm Brinnin of The New York Times, who wrote:

Strictly in terms of technique, the book is a knockout. Subsuming all the work of nearly 30 years, including and surpassing the remarkable "Homage to Mistress Bradstreet," Berryman seems to have grown in a progress that calls to mind André Gide's "Gradation, gradation—and then a sudden leap." Such bravado and such excellence calls for celebration.

== His Toy, His Dream, His Rest ==
This book won the National Book Award for Poetry and the Bollingen Prize in 1969. Before its publication, the poets Adrienne Rich and Robert Lowell praised the book, particularly the opening "Opus Posthumous" section in which Henry speaks to the reader from the grave. Lowell preferred the poems in this second volume to the first, writing Berryman, "They add up enormously and are much clearer [than the poems in 77 Dream Songs]." Other contemporaries of Berryman's, including Elizabeth Bishop and Conrad Aiken, also were very impressed and wrote Berryman letters of congratulations on the volume. Upon its publication, the book also received a positive review in The New York Times Book Review by the literary scholar Helen Vendler.

The Norton Anthology of Modern Poetry says that, in this volume, "[Berryman] described personal calamities and the deaths of friends such as the poets Frost, Winters, MacNeice, Jarrell, Roethke, Plath, Williams, and especially Schwartz." The volume was dedicated "to Mark Van Doren, and to the sacred memory of Delmore Schwartz." Although many of the poems eulogize the deaths of Berryman's friends, more of these elegies (12 in total) are about Schwartz than anyone else. In addition to the elegies, the volume includes poems that document Henry/Berryman's trip to Ireland, experiences with fame, problems with drugs and alcohol, and problems with women.

Consisting of 308 poems, this volume makes up most of The Dream Songs, outnumbering the 77 dream songs in the previous volume.
