= James Blanding Sloan =

American artist (1886–1975)

- Born: September 19, 1886; Corsicana, Texas, US
- Died: October 6, 1975 (aged 89); Canyon, Contra Costa County, California, US
- Other names: Blanding Sloan, J. Blanding Sloan
- Education: Chicago Academy of Fine Arts
- Occupations: Printmaker, etcher, theatrical designer, educator, painter, puppeteer
- Spouse(s): Lillian Weiss, Mildred Taylor

James Blanding Sloan (September 19, 1886 – October 6, 1975), also known as Blanding Sloan, was an American etcher, printmaker, theatrical designer, educator, painter, and puppeteer. He worked as a stage set designer for The Greenwich Village Follies (1922–1923) in New York City, and at the Marionette Theater Artist Studio (1928–1929) in San Francisco.

== Early life and education ==
James Blanding Sloan was born on September 19, 1886, in Corsicana, Texas. He was the first son born to Alexander C. Sloan, a physician and Alabama native, and to Henrietta O. Blanding, a Virginian. At the age of 12 he created the sets and acted in his first play; seven years later, while a student at Austin College in Sherman, Texas, he slipped hopping a freight train and lost a leg.

By 1910 he was studying at the Chicago Academy of fine arts (today's School of the Art Institute of Chicago), where he was later made a teacher of color composition. He worked with the renowned color printmakers George Senseney and Bror Julius Olsson Nordfeldt and exhibited for the first time in 1914 with the Chicago Society of Etchers.

== Career ==
In 1912 he began his secondary career in theatre scenery, lighting and costume design for The Players Workshop of Chicago, where he created sets for Maxwell Bodenheim and Ben Hecht. Just after America entered World War I he was arrested for posting signs which urged young men not to register for the military draft, but to claim exemptions as conscientious objectors. A year later he moved to New York City, where he worked in over a dozen Broadway productions, including the Ziegfeld Follies, as well as The Greenwich Village Follies; he also exhibited his prints and set designs to great acclaim.

In 1923 Sloan and his second wife, Mildred Taylor, left New York intending to start a grand tour of Asia by driving across the United States. Due to his temporary illness the couple decided to settle permanently in the San Francisco Bay Area, where during the next two decades over forty major exhibitions of his work were enthusiastically received. The public demand for his etchings and block prints was so great that a catalogue raisonné was published in 1926. His subject matter was sometimes decorative, but he also focused on controversial social and religious issues; on one occasion a sexually explicit scene of Sloan making love to his wife was restricted to his "private portfolio." By far his most extraordinary undertaking was the creation of a puppet theatre, where initially he intended to produce "original plays" for children, such as Rastus Plays Pirate, but by 1928 he transformed the idea into the Marionette Theatre Association for adults. At first he and Ralph Chessé produced classic works by Shakespeare and Eugene O'Neill, but in April 1929 Sloan decided to push the boundaries of censorship and staged Heavenly Discourse by Charles Erskine Scott Wood with anatomically correct nude puppets. In one scene God fondled a naked Eve who sits on his lap. The "anarchist Sloan" was arrested and the production closed several times, but eventually continued to sold-out audiences. His next production, the West Coast premiere of Sky Girl, portrayed an abstract world run by robots 50 thousand years in the future. He also used his theater to run foreign films that had been banned elsewhere.

Beginning in 1924 the Sloans established a second residence south of the San Francisco Bay Area, in Carmel-by-the-Sea, California, at that time the largest art colony on the Pacific Coast. Here Blanding was hired by the University of California Extension Division to teach summer classes in etching, theatre design, and painting. He also contributed his prints to exhibitions at the Carmel Arts and Crafts Club and staged puppet performances for the local children. In 1929 his linoleum-cut prints were reproduced in the local literary journal, The Carmelite. That same year he and his wife established Carmel's first international film festival and screened The Light of Asia, the story of Buddha's life with an all-Indian cast, and Hollywood Extra – 9413, a "very modern" psychological drama produced by the abstract Yugoslav painter Slavko Vorkapich.

By 1931, the Sloans had moved to Los Angeles where there were opportunities to exhibit his prints and work on theatre and puppet productions as well as in Hollywood. In 1938 Blanding was appointed a Regional Theatre Director for the Federal Theatre Project of the WPA, but resigned eighteen months later to become Supervisor of the National Youth Administration for the American Southwest.

During World War II he and his protégée, Wah Chang, created the East–West Film Company and produced a variety of films, including an interview and performance by the legendary singer Leadbelly as well as The Way of Peace (1947), a controversial film funded by the Lutheran Church depicting the destruction of the world by nuclear weapons. The latter may have caused his dismissal from the Disney Studios.

By 1948, he was living in Altadena, California, and in the mid-1960s he moved to Berkeley, California, and then to the nearby town of Canyon.

== Death ==
He died at the age of 89, on October 6, 1975, in Canyon, California.

== Exhibitions ==
- Etchings and Wood Block Prints by Blanding Sloan, organized by the Isaac Delgado Museum of Art, December 31, 1926 – January 14, 1927, at New Orleans Museum of Art
