= I Want You Women up North to Know =

1934 poem by Tillie Olsen

"I Want You Women up North to Know" is the first published poem by Tillie Olsen, appearing in the Partisan Review (March 1934). It is based on a letter to the editor of New Masses written by Felipe Ibarro about worker exploitation in a San Antonio garment manufacturing company.

== Historical context ==
The poem is based on Felipe Ibarro's letter to the editor which was published in New Masses on January 9, 1934. The letter specifies the Juvenile Manufacturing Corporation in San Antonio, Texas as a source of exploitation for the four women it references.

Both Olsen's poem and Ibarro's letter have been called proletarian literature, a popular school of writing in the United States in the 1930s. Because of its basis on Ibarro's letter, Olsen's poem also fits within the genre of workers correspondence. At the time the poem was written, magazines supporting the proletarian movement sought writings from working class individuals about their lives and experiences.

== Outline ==
Like Felipe Ibarro's letter, "I Want You Women up North to Know" uses a first person narration to address women consumers in the northern United States. In the poem, Olsen describes four female garment workers who are each referenced in Ibarro's letter: Catalina Rodriguez, Maria Vasquez, Catalina Torres, and Ambrosa Espinoza. In both the poem and the letter, each woman's wages, work, and challenging living situation is described.

=== Contrasts with the letter ===
Although Olsen follows Ibarro's descriptions of the four women in her writing, the poem also contains some differences. One of these differences is the added imagery throughout the poem. At the beginning of the poem, Olsen uses words and phrases such as: "dyed in blood, are stitched in wasting flesh", "bloated face", and "gouging the wages down" to emphasize the unfavorable working conditions of the women. She also more deeply describes the women's bodies and thoughts in each of their respective sections.

Unlike Ibarro's letter, Olsen also references the women workers a second time as she summarizes their struggle toward the end of the poem. This again emphasizes the poor working and living conditions of the workers and the daily challenges each of them face. In this part of the poem, Olsen mentions prostitution a second time as being another option for women in this context to make money. This reference to prostitution occurs twice in the poem and once in the letter.

== Interpretations and analysis ==
Suzanne Lynch notes that the narrator of the poem specifically addresses women consumers in the North who benefit from women laborers in the South. The gendered descriptions of longing, motherhood, and sacrifice are directed to an audience that would be more likely to sympathize with the content rather than a male audience. In first mentioning Macy's, Gimbels, and Marshall Field's, the narrator of the poem makes references that women in the North would understand. As the narrator continues to mention "the salesladies trill", the "bloated face", and a "dissolve into maria, ambrosa, catalina", Lynch argues that Northern women readers are gradually ushered into a previously unknown world. She supports that reading could also make the women of the North victims of a capitalist system because they unknowingly contribute to the exploitation of their sex.

In analyzing "I Want You Women up North to Know" Constance Coiner notes Olsen's opposition to what she calls "the bourgeois poet" when Olsen parodies more lyrical language which would not be considered appropriate for the harsh content of the poem in lines 21–29. According to Coiner, Olsen believed overly artistic language would distance the reader from the true experience of the women in the poem. Her mimicry of "the bourgeois poet" parodies what Coiner refers to as a "tradition of 'romanticizing' the worker" which would counteract the political agenda of proletariat writing.

The genre shift from Ibarro's letter to Olsen's poem is possibly the most notable difference between the two pieces of writing. Cary Nelson also observes Coiner's reading of Olsen's resistance of "the bourgeois poet" but also notes that the poem is not entirely opposed to rhythmic language and poetic style. Even though Olsen rejects the style of "the bourgeois poet," her work is still nevertheless poetry and is subject to questioning about its moral and political implications. Though the appropriateness of Olsen's figurative language for her proletariat purpose has been debated, Nelson finds the poem "politically successful." In addition, she argues its contemporary relevance as sweatshops in other nations still exist. In this way, Nelson argues, the women in the poem become representative of a suffering class or body which could speak to readers and workers on a global or international level.
