= Tell Me a Riddle =

Book by Tillie Olsen

- First edition
- Author: Tillie Olsen
- Language: English
- Genre: Short story collection
- Publisher: J. B. Lippincott & Co.
- Publication date: 1961
- Publication place: United States
- Media type: Print (hardback & paperback)
- Pages: 125
- OCLC: 748997729

Tell Me a Riddle is a collection of short fiction by Tillie Olsen first published by J. B. Lippincott & Co. in 1961.

The volume is composed of three short stories and a novella, the title piece "Tell Me a Riddle". "Tell Me a Riddle" was awarded the O. Henry Award in 1961 for best American short story.

The works in the collection continue to be the most highly acclaimed of Olsen's literary oeuvre.

== Stories ==
The magazine and date of original publication are indicated. The titles of the stories are those established in the 1961 J. B. Lippincott & Co. volume, and the table of contents ordered by the Dell Publishing collection in 1962: the order in which they were written.

- "I Stand Here Ironing" (Pacific Spectator, 1956. Originally titled "Help Her to Believe")
- "Hey Sailor, What Ship?" (New Campus Writing, 1957)
- "O Yes" (Prairie Schooner, 1957, under the title "Baptism")
- "Tell Me A Riddle" (New World Writing, Stanford Short Stories, both 1960)

== Reception ==
The short story "Tell Me a Riddle" has been called "a powerful study of the politics of voice", "an American Classic", and described as "beautifully crafted and painfully real in the issues of family that it raises".

Time named Tell Me a Riddle one of the ten best books of the year in its December 1961 issue. The title story "Tell Me A Riddle" won first prize O. Henry Award the same year.

== Form and style ==
"When she wrote 'Tell Me a Riddle,' Tillie Olsen, like William Blake, covered paper with words 'for the angels to read.'" - Literary critic John Leonard the Introduction to Tell Me a Riddle, 1994 Dell edition.

One of the outstanding features of Olsen's literary form is the "extraordinary compression" of her short stories. The origins of this form lie in the "immediate circumstances" under which Olsen wrote: a low-income working-class mother raising four daughters, who recognized both the limitations and possibilities these hardships presented her as a writer.

Literary critic Joanne S. Fry explains that Olsen's social realities and her awareness of herself as subject to the larger historical influences in the 20th century led her to create short stories and novellas that are "novelistic" in form. Fry writes:

These are qualities that differentiate her short fiction from other innovative modern or contemporary short fiction, that make her stories instrumental in the development of contemporary short fiction.

The Dungannon Foundation, in presenting Olsen with the Rea Award in 1994, declared that Tell Me a Riddle possessed "the lyric intensity of an Emily Dickinson poem and the scope of a Balzac novel."

Literary critic Marilyn Yalom praises "Olsen's style, that accounts for her prestige in literary circles." Biographers Mickey Pearlman and Abby H. P. Werlock wrote:

Even if Tillie Olsen does not write another book, we are all richer for having read the major works —Yonnondio and Tell Me a Riddle—and for the way Olsen's voice has touched the lives of writers, workers, and women.

Literary critic Mara Faulkner comments on the feminist component in the collection:

Olsen's writing is alive with the conviction that creativity, strength, and adaptability are far more common in women than most people think, though one's vision has to shift to see the unconventional, sometimes desperate, manifestations of these qualities.

== Adaptations ==
Tell Me a Riddle, a film based on the short story collection, was released in 1980.

== Sources ==
- Faulkner, Mara. 1993. Protest and Possibility in the Writing of Tillie Olsen. University Press of Virginia, Charlotteville and London. ISBN 0-8139-1417-5
- Frye, Joanne S. 1995. Tillie Olsen: A Study of the Short Fiction. Twayne Publishers, New York. ISBN 0-8057-0863-4
- Leonard, John. 1994. Introduction to Tell Me a Riddle in Tell Me Riddle, Delta Books published by Dell, New York. ISBN 0-385-29010-1
- Mambrol, Nasrullah. 2020. "Analysis of Tillie Olsen's Stories." Literary Theory and Criticism, Literariness. https://literariness.org/2020/06/22/analysis-of-tillie-olsens-stories/ Retrieved 19 November 2023.
- Olsen, Tillie. 1961. Tell Me A Riddle. J. B. Lippincott & Co., Philadelphia. OCLC 748997729
- Pearlman, Mickey and Werlick, Abby H. P.. 1991. Tillie Olsen. Twayne Publishers, Boston, Mass. ISBN 0-8057-7632-X
