= Yonnondio =

1974 novel by Tillie Olsen

Yonnondio: From the Thirties
- First edition
- Author: Tillie Olsen
- Language: English
- Published: 1974 (Delacorte Press)
- Publication place: United States
- Media type: Print (paperback)
- Pages: 196 pp
- ISBN: 0-440-09196-9
- OCLC: 55131437
- Dewey Decimal: 813/.54 22
- LC Class: PS3565.L82 Y66 2004

Yonnondio: From the Thirties is a novel by American author Tillie Olsen which was published in 1974 but written in the 1930s. The novel details the lives of the Holbrook family, depicting their struggle to survive during the 1920s. Yonnondio explores the life of the working-class family, as well as themes of motherhood, socioeconomic order, and the pre-depression era. The novel was published as an unfinished work.

== Summary ==
The novel follows the lives of the Holbrook family, who are struggling to survive during the Great Depression. The family consists of Anna and Jim, their children Mazie, Emily, Ben, Janey, Sam, and Evie, and various other family members and acquaintances. The story focuses on the family's poverty, illness, and social injustice, and their attempts to survive and find happiness in the face of adversity. Other characters include Mazie's boyfriend and a young boy named Shim, who is Mazie's friend. The novel begins in a small Wyoming mining town, where Jim Holbrook works in the coal mine. As the narrative progresses, the reader discovers that Jim drinks heavily and beats Anna and their children. Mazie follows Jim into town one evening and is nearly thrown down a mineshaft by the deranged miner, Sheen McEvoy. Mazie is saved by the night watchman, and instead McEvoy falls down the shaft to his death. Mazie immediately develops a fever, and the Holbrooks make plans to move east in the spring. Anna takes on a variety of short-term employment to financially prepare for the move. Jim is involved in a mine explosion, attributed to the carelessness of the new fire boss, and goes missing for five days. When Jim returns, it is with a firm resolve to remove his family from the town.

In the spring, the Holbrooks leave the mining town, traveling across Nebraska and South Dakota, where their wagon is briefly immobilized by a storm. At their South Dakota tenant farm, the scene is pastoral and the Holbrooks are initially optimistic about the farm's prospects. For the first time, the family is healthy and well-fed, and Mazie and Will begin attending school. Mazie begins to take an interest in education and befriends the learned Old Man Caldwell next door, who passes on some books to Mazie when he dies, though Jim promptly sells them. As the winter approaches, Jim realizes that after a year of working the land, the family remains in debt. With the arrival of winter, the Holbrooks no longer have enough food. Anna becomes pregnant and ill, and after a marital dispute, Jim leaves the family, returning after ten days.

After the birth of Bess in the following March, the family leaves the farm and moves to Omaha, Nebraska. They take up residence in a city slum near a slaughterhouse. The smell from the slaughterhouse makes the children ill and Anna is no longer able to control them at home. Mazie becomes dreamy and detached, fantasizing about the farm as an escape from the horrors of the city. Jim gets a job in the sewers, and he and Anna are unable to support their family. Anna suffers a miscarriage and is bedridden for several days. When she regains mobility, Anna begins taking in laundry to supplement Jim's income, though Jim explicitly disapproves. Jim gets a job at the slaughterhouse, where he earns a little more money, and he buys fireworks for the family on the Fourth of July to celebrate. When she is excluded from the celebration, Mazie becomes acutely conscious of the social and political implications of her gender. During a heat wave, Anna continues to work alone, canning fruits to feed the family through the winter, while the children run the streets and scavenge in the dump. The novel ends in the Holbrook apartment, with Anna singing to Ben. Bess enthusiastically bangs a jar lid against the floor, and the family listens to the radio together for the first time.

== Characters ==
Mazie Holbrook: Jim and Anna's eldest daughter. Although she is just six and a half years old at the beginning of the novel, she assumes many responsibilities in the house. She helps her mother start the fire, cook and care for her little brothers and sister. Her character changes as events progress in the novel, and as she becomes aware of her social position. Her own way of escaping the harsh reality is portrayed in her daydreaming and imaginary trances. She believes that stars are "lamps in houses up there, or flowers growing in the night" (46). According to most critics, had the novel been completed, Mazie would have been the revolutionary character in the narrative when she grows.

Anna Holbrook: Mazie's mother. She believes that education is the only way for her children to achieve upward mobility in society; she tells Mazie, "An edjication [education] is what you kids are going to get. It means your hands stay white and you read books and work in an office" (4). The violence she experiences from her husband is in part reflected in the violent attitude she displays towards her children as she shouts at and beats them constantly. In some parts of the novel, she is an active housewife, always busy with canning food or doing laundry. However, when she gets sick due to a miscarriage, she is usually sleeping and the house and kids are left unattended to.

Jim Holbrook: He is the patriarch of the Holbrook family. In his attempt to make ends meet, he moves from one job to another, first, a coal miner, next, a farmer, and finally a meat packer. He heads to the bar and gets drunk, as most other workers do, to escape from reality. The financial stress on the family is reflected on Jim's violent attitude towards his wife and kids: "He had nothing but heavy blows to the children and he struck Anna too often to remember" (9). However, in some parts of the novel, he shows care to his sick wife and plays with his children.

Will and Ben Holbrook: Mazie's younger brothers. Will is attached to Mazie in the beginning of the novel. However, as he grows a little older, he wants to be independent and to have his own friends, secret adventures and gadgets. Ben is weak in body and has lung disease especially when the family moves to the smelly, unclean area next to the packing houses.

Jimmie and Bess Holbrook: The youngest son and daughter in the family. Although her role is very limited in the novel, Bess closes the unfinished novel with an optimistic tone when she grabs a jar lid and bangs it enthusiastically against the floor.

== Major themes ==
The Pre-Depression Era: Though this novel was written during the Great Depression, the main plot of the story takes place during the 1920s. Though the themes of the great depression are visible in the family's struggles and tribulations, as Burkom and Williams put it, Yonnondio actually represents the 1920s more realistically than The Great Gatsby by F. Scott Fitzgerald which shows the life of the stereotypical flappers of the time. By exploring the lives of the working class, the novel portrays a "realistic depiction of the squalid conditions in which the unknown of America's working class miraculously endure." Had the novel been completed, it would have more precisely represented the depression era via the characters planned involvement in the proletarian movement.

Motherhood: Motherhood is a central theme throughout Yonnondio because the main perspective, that of Mazie, is watching and commenting on her mother, Anna. As Deborah Rosenfelt put it, the novel focuses on: "the unparalleled satisfaction and fulfillment combined with the overwhelming all-consuming burden of motherhood." Mazie watches Anna work tirelessly as a wife and mother, giving her health and happiness up for the benefit of her children. To accomplish her goal, Anna finds herself doing whatever is necessary (working extra jobs, finding alternative food sources, and ruining her health) no matter how extreme. To Mazie, motherhood is seen as a great sacrifice a mother gives to her children; yet, there are times when her responsibilities overlap causing the opposite effect. Due to the many chores and financial obligations of Anna, the children are often left to wander about freely without supervision, because Anna is mentally unable to care for them, putting them into danger.

Nightmares: This aspect of the novel revolves around the idea of living in constant fear of not having food or enough money, not being able to escape their lives, or dying in the coal mines. The characters are in a constant state of worry and frustration which begins from the first sentence: "[t]he whistles always woke Mazie" (1). Each day they are reminded, awoken to the sound of death from the mines: the likely fate of every male worker in the town. Mazie, as a girl, also has a close encounter of being consumed by the mine when a miner tries to throw her into a cavern. According to Bonnie Lyons: "the miner imagines the mine as a ravenous woman [. . .] [and] the fact that the miner sees woman as devourer rather than nurturer demonstrates the extremity of his condition, a result of the economic and social conditions in general." The characters are caught in a nightmare caused by their circumstances—leading to the next theme.

Capacity vs. Circumstances: One of the major ideas of the novel is that the Holbrook family's behavior is not instinctive, but an outgrowth of their living situation: their circumstances. These include poverty, education, working conditions, patriarchy and space; that is to say, with a few changes, their lives could be greatly improved, and violence and despair would decrease. This theme also refers to the novel itself which was to have the children grow up to become activists and escapee their drudgery. Mazie, and her brother, were: "to go west [. . .] become organizers [. . .] [and write about] the experiences of her people." The circumstances of Olsen's life caused the novel to be compiled in the 1970s left in its unfinished state.

== Style and genre ==
A fragmentary and experimental work that is at once feminist, modernist, and proletarian, Yonnondio provides a unique example of the synthesis of two distinct but concurrent literary traditions: the proletarian socialist-realist aesthetic advocated by the political left of the 1930s and the experimental Modernism of mass culture. Yonnondio's unusual aesthetic represents a blending of these two discordant traditions, with the long passages of near-realism typical of the proletarian literary movement juxtaposed with intermittent, sharply contrasting interjections of poetic stream of consciousness. While Yonnondio has typically been marketed as a work of fiction, much of the narrative is derived from Olsen's own childhood experiences, and critics have situated Olsen's approach to writing between a process of recording and one of transforming reality, suggesting that Olsen's fidelity to fact is better described as a fidelity to essential fact, with form and pattern never imposed, but rather, exposed.

== Allusions and references ==
Yonnondio means lament for the lost.

Lament for the aborigines . . . the word itself a dirge . . .

No picture, poem, statement, passing them to the future
Yonnondio! Yonnondio!—unlimn'd they disappear;
To-day gives place, and faces—the cities, farms, factories fade;
A muffled sonorous sound, a wailing word is borne through the air for a moment,
Then blank and gone and still, and utterly lost.

From Walt Whitman's "Yonnondio"

This is the opening quote, placed after the dedication page, of the novel. The first seven lines of Whitman's poem are removed (leaving only five lines) to direct the quote to relate to the topic of the book—to the people of America and not the original subject the aborigines. The first line is a compilation of Olsen's own words defining the original poem's intention and part of the missing first line of the original poem. The quote not only references the characters but also the novel itself—in that the end of the book was lost.

== Publication history ==
Olsen was just 19 years old when she began writing Yonnondio: From the Thirties in 1932. She managed to publish a portion of the first chapter in a 1934 issue of Partisan Review under the title "The Iron Throat". However, due to her pregnancy with her second child, her political activities and employment, she set aside the drafts of the unfinished books only to find them 40 years later while searching for another manuscript. Olsen put together the numerous drafts and old papers she found in order to present this unfinished novel. She notes that although she had to make decisions as to where different scenes belonged and whether to include some drafts, she did not add to or rewrite any parts of the novel. The unfinished novel was published in 1974. The book has been published by different publishing houses including Faber and Faber (1974), Delacorte Press (1974), Dell Publishing (1979), Virago Press Ltd (1980), Delta (1988), Bantam Doubleday Dell, and University of Nebraska Press (2004).

== Criticism and analysis ==
Much literary criticism has been produced about Yonnondio since its publication in 1974. Critics have focused on a large variety of issues ranging from socialist-feminist portrayals of film in the novel to a diverse spectrum of various psychological concerns. MacPherson, for instance, has looked extensively at the ways in which Olsen's characters' representations portray complicated issues of class in relation to psychological escapism.

Other Marxist-feminist criticism has also been produced including Rosenfelt's essay "From the Thirties: Tillie Olsen and the Radical Tradition." Rosenfelt worked directly with Olsen while writing this article and she looks at the many ways in which Olsen's biography directly relates to her works of fiction, especially Yonnondio. By comparing Yonnondio with Agnes Smedley's Daughter of Earth, Rosenfelt reveals the ways in which female sexuality is downplayed in the novel. Rosenfelt suggests this occurs as a direct result of Olsen's readings of communist theory, much of which was surprisingly conservative and patriarchal in its attitudes towards women in the 1930s. Rosenfelt also argues that the Holbrook children (especially Mazie) are explicitly socialized into accepting traditional, limiting views of sex and gender. Rosenfelt links the cruel behaviors of Anna (her abuse of her children) directly back to the inevitable result of living within a patriarchal, capitalist regime. Other notable criticism has been produced regarding Olsen's representations of Jewishness in Yonnondio. Lyons has argued that, although somewhat sparsely portrayed, Olsen's own Jewish background is uniquely represented within the characterization of Anna during her recollections of her grandmother, and also her numerous candle-lighting rituals. Lyons links Anna's practices with the behaviors of Eva in Olsen's famous short story "Tell Me a Riddle."

The scholar Anthony Dawahare has notably written on the book's "dialectical and utopian consciousness" as it relates specifically to "the authorial voice." Dawahare's primary argument concerns the level of capitalist exploitation exhibited within the consciousnesses of the Holbrook family. He recognizes the crucial role Yonnondio plays in representing the resurrected ideals concerning certain dialectical, utopian philosophies that were increasingly being revived during the mass labor movements occurring in the U.S. during the era of the Great Depression. Thus, this article is useful for both its philosophical and its historical arguments.
