= Delmore Schwartz =

American poet (1913–1966)

- Born: December 8, 1913; New York City, U.S.
- Died: July 11, 1966 (aged 52); New York City, U.S.
- Education: New York University
- Occupation: Poet
- Writing career
- Genres: Poetry, fiction
- Notable works: In Dreams Begin Responsibilities, Summer Knowledge: New and Selected Poems
- Notable awards: Bollingen Prize

Delmore Schwartz (December 8, 1913 – July 11, 1966) was an American poet and short story writer.

== Early life ==
Schwartz was born in 1913 in Brooklyn, New York, where he also grew up. His parents, Harry and Rose, both Romanian Jews, separated when Schwartz was nine, and their divorce had a profound effect on him. He had a younger brother, Kenneth. In 1930, Schwartz's father suddenly died at the age of 49. Though Harry had accumulated a good deal of wealth from his dealings in the real estate business, Delmore inherited only a small amount of that money as the result of the shady dealings of the executor of Harry's estate. According to Schwartz's biographer, James Atlas, "Delmore continued to hope that he would eventually receive his legacy [even] as late as 1946."

Schwartz spent time at Columbia University and the University of Wisconsin before graduating with a B.A. from New York University in 1935. He then did some graduate work in philosophy at Harvard University, where he studied with the philosopher Alfred North Whitehead, left and returned to New York without receiving a degree. He also had expressed feelings rejected by the English department at Harvard, on account of his Jewish identity.

In 1937, he married Gertrude Buckman, a book reviewer for Partisan Review, whom he divorced after six years.

== Career in writing ==
Soon thereafter, he made his parents' disastrous marriage the subject of his most famous short story, "In Dreams Begin Responsibilities", which was published in 1937 in the Partisan Review. This story and other short stories and poems became his first book, also titled In Dreams Begin Responsibilities, published in 1938 when Schwartz was only 25 years old. The book was well received, and made him a well-known figure in New York intellectual circles. His work received praise from some of the most respected people in literature, including T. S. Eliot, William Carlos Williams, and Ezra Pound, and Schwartz was considered one of the most gifted and promising young writers of his generation. According to James Atlas, Allen Tate responded to the book by stating that "[Schwartz's] poetic style marked 'the first real innovation we've had since Eliot and Pound.'"

For the next couple of decades, he continued to publish stories, poems, plays, and essays, and edited the Partisan Review from 1943 to 1955, as well as The New Republic. Schwartz was deeply upset when his epic poem, Genesis, which he published in 1943 and hoped would stand alongside other Modernist epics like The Waste Land and The Cantos as a masterpiece, received a negative critical response. Later, in 1948, he married the novelist Elizabeth Pollet. This relationship also ended in divorce.

In 1959, he became the youngest-ever recipient of the Bollingen Prize, awarded for a collection of poetry he published that year, Summer Knowledge: New and Selected Poems. His poetry differed from his stories in that it was less autobiographical and more philosophical. His verse also became increasingly abstract in his later years. He taught creative writing at six universities, including Syracuse, Princeton, and Kenyon College.

The heavy bear who goes with me,
A manifold honey to smear his face,
Clumsy and lumbering here and there,
The central ton of every place,
The hungry beating brutish one
In love with candy, anger, and sleep,
Crazy factotum, dishevelling all,
Climbs the building, kicks the football,
Boxes his brother in the hate-ridden city.

— from "The Heavy Bear Who Goes With Me"

In addition to being known as a gifted writer, Schwartz was a conversationalist and spent time entertaining friends at the White Horse Tavern in New York City.

Much of Schwartz's work is notable for its philosophical and deeply meditative nature, and the literary critic, R.W. Flint, wrote that Schwartz's stories were "the definitive portrait of the Jewish middle class in New York during the Depression." In particular, Schwartz emphasized the large divide that existed between his generation (which came of age during the Depression) and his parents' generation (who had often come to the United States as first-generation immigrants and whose idealistic view of America differed greatly from his own). In another take on Schwartz's fiction, Morris Dickstein wrote that "Schwartz's best stories are either poker-faced satirical takes on the bohemians and outright failures of his generation, as in 'The World Is a Wedding' and 'New Year’s Eve,' or chronicles of the distressed lives of his parents' generation, for whom the promise of American life has not panned out."

A selection of his short stories was published posthumously in 1978 under the title In Dreams Begin Responsibilities and Other Stories and was edited by James Atlas, who had written a biography of Schwartz, Delmore Schwartz: The Life of An American Poet, two years earlier. Later, another collection of Schwartz's work, Screeno: Stories & Poems, was published in 2004. This collection contained fewer stories than In Dreams Begin Responsibilities and Other Stories but it also included a selection of some of Schwartz's best-known poems like "The Heavy Bear Who Goes With Me" and "In The Naked Bed, In Plato's Cave". Screeno also featured an introduction by the fiction writer and essayist, Cynthia Ozick.

== Death ==
Schwartz was unable to repeat or build on his early successes later in life as a result of alcoholism and mental illness, and his last years were spent in seclusion at the Chelsea Hotel in New York. In fact, Schwartz was so isolated from the rest of the world that when he died in his hotel room on July 11, 1966, at age 52, of a heart attack, two days passed before his body was identified at the morgue.

Schwartz was interred at Cedar Park Cemetery, in Emerson, New Jersey.

== Tributes ==
One of the earliest tributes to Schwartz came from Schwartz's friend, fellow poet Robert Lowell, who published the poem "To Delmore Schwartz" in 1959 in the book Life Studies. In it, Lowell reminisces about the time that the two poets lived together in Cambridge, Massachusetts, in 1946, writing that they were "underseas fellows, nobly mad, / we talked away our friends."

Schwartz's former student at Syracuse University, Lou Reed, was the singer and principal songwriter for the band the Velvet Underground. Wanting to dedicate a song to Schwartz on their debut album, The Velvet Underground and Nico, Reed chose "European Son" as it had the fewest lyrics; rock and roll lyrics were something Schwartz abhorred. The song was recorded in April 1966, three months before Schwartz's death, but was not released until March 1967. According to musicologist Richard Witts, the song "reads like little more than a song of loathing" toward Schwartz, who refused to see Reed while living at the Chelsea Hotel. Some pressings of The Velvet Underground & Nico referred to the song as "European Son (to Delmore Schwartz)".

Lou Reed's 1982 solo album The Blue Mask includes his second Schwartz homage with the song "My House". A more direct tribute to Schwartz than the Velvet Underground's "European Son", the lyrics of "My House" are about Reed's relationship with Schwartz. In the song, Reed writes that Schwartz "was the first great man that I ever met".

In the June 2012 issue of Poetry magazine, Lou Reed published a short prose tribute to Schwartz entitled "O Delmore How I Miss You". In the piece, Reed quotes and references a number of Schwartz's short stories and poems including "In Dreams Begin Responsibilities", "The World Is a Wedding", and "The Heavy Bear Who Goes with Me". "O Delmore How I Miss You" was re-published as the preface to the New Directions 2012 reissue of Schwartz's posthumously published story collection In Dreams Begin Responsibilities and Other Stories.

Another musician to pay tribute to Schwartz is Bono, the lead singer of the Irish rock band U2, who was inspired by the poet's work when writing the lyrics of U2's "Acrobat". The song, from the band's 1991 album Achtung Baby, is dedicated to the poet and in its final verse is quoted the title of his book In Dreams Begin Responsibilities.

In 1968, Schwartz's friend and peer, fellow poet John Berryman, dedicated his book His Toy, His Dream, His Rest "to the sacred memory of Delmore Schwartz", including 12 elegiac poems about Schwartz in the book. In "Dream Song #149", Berryman wrote of Schwartz,

In the brightness of his promise,
unstained, I saw him thro' the mist of the actual
blazing with insight, warm with gossip
thro' all our Harvard years
when both of us were just becoming known
I got him out of a police-station once, in Washington, the world is tref
and grief too astray for tears.

The most ambitious literary tribute to Schwartz came in 1975, when Saul Bellow, a one-time protégé of Schwartz, published his Pulitzer Prize-winning novel Humboldt's Gift, which was based on his relationship with Schwartz. Although the character of Von Humboldt Fleischer is Bellow's portrait of Schwartz during Schwartz's declining years, the book is actually a testament to Schwartz's lasting artistic influence on Bellow. Although he is a genius, the Fleischer/Schwartz character struggles financially and has trouble finding a secure university teaching position. He becomes increasingly paranoid and jealous of the success of the main character, Charlie Citrine (who is based upon Bellow himself), becoming isolated and descending into alcoholism and madness.

Charles Bukowski wrote a biographical poem about Schwartz, published in his posthumous Open All Night. He characterized Schwartz's writing:

his criticism was brilliant in its rancor and decisiveness;
he was really more of a bitch than a bard-
his poetry too fawning and delicate.
as a critic he was a good surgeon,

as a poet he was stalled in a kind of stale whimsy.

In 1996, Donald Margulies wrote the play Collected Stories, in which an aging writer and teacher reveals to a young student that she once had a great affair in her youth with Schwartz in Greenwich Village while Schwartz was in declining health from alcoholism and mental illness. The student then controversially uses the affair revelation as the basis for a successful novel. The play was produced twice off-Broadway and once on Broadway.

In John A. McDermott's poetry collection The Idea of God in Tennessee, he includes a poem written for and referencing Schwartz, titled The Poet's Body, Unclaimed in the Manhattan Morgue. The poem makes mention of Schwartz's writing, daily habits, and death.

A play by Romulus Linney about Schwartz's friendship with Milton Klonsky, Schwartz's protege and friend and a writer of nonfiction, was presented at Ensemble Theater Company in New York City in November and December 2005, and at The Redhouse Theatre in Syracuse, N.Y., during its 2004/05 season.

In the final episode of the third season of True Detective, Wayne Hays' (Mahershala Ali) wife, Amelia Reardon (Carmen Ejogo), reads to her students "Calmly We Walk through This April's Day".

== Published works ==
- The Poets' Pack (Rudge, New York, 1932), school anthology including four poems by Schwartz.
- In Dreams Begin Responsibilities (New Directions, 1938; reprinted 1978), ISBN 978-0-8112-0680-8
- Shenandoah and Other Verse Plays (New Directions, 1941).
- Genesis: Book One (New Directions, 1943), book-length poem about the growth of a human being.
- The World Is a Wedding (New Directions, 1948), a collection of short stories.
- Vaudeville for a Princess and Other Poems (New Directions, 1950).
- Summer Knowledge: New and Selected Poems (New Directions, 1959; reprinted 1967), ISBN 978-0-8112-0191-9.
- Successful Love and Other Stories (Corinth Books, 1961; Persea Books, 1985), ISBN 978-0-89255-094-4

Published posthumously

- Donald Dike, David Zucker (ed.) Selected Essays (1970; University of Chicago Press, 1985), ISBN 978-0-226-74214-4
- Letters of Delmore Schwartz, ed. Robert Phillips (1984) ISBN 978-0-86538-048-6
- The Ego Is Always at the Wheel: Bagatelles, ed. Robert Phillips (1986), a collection of humorous whimsical short essays
- Schwartz, Delmore (1989). Last and Lost Poems. New Directions. ISBN 9780811210966. ed. Robert Phillips (New Directions, 1989) ISBN 978-0-8112-1096-6
- Screeno: Stories & Poems. New Directions. 2004. ISBN 978-0-8112-1573-2.
- The Uncollected Delmore Schwartz, Arrowsmith Press, 2019.

== See also ==
- List of poets from the United States
