= Joanne Frye =

American academic (1944–2024)

Joanne S. Frye
- Born: November 6, 1944 (age 81); South Bend, Indiana
- Occupations: Professor of English and Women's Studies
- Years active: 1976-2009

Academic background
- Education: Indiana University Bloomington

Academic work
- Discipline: English Literature, Women's Studies
- Institutions: College of Wooster
- Notable works: Living Stories, Telling Lives and Biting the Moon

Joanne Schultz Frye (November 6, 1944 – July 22, 2024) was a Professor Emerita of English and Women's Studies at the College of Wooster. Frye is known for her feminist literary criticism and interdisciplinary inquiry into motherhood. She specialized in research on fiction by and about women, such as the work of Virginia Woolf, Tillie Olsen, and Jane Lazarre.

Frye's first book, Living Stories, Telling Lives: Women and the Novel in Contemporary Experience, was featured in Betsy Draine's 1989 review essay, "Refusing the Wisdom of Solomon: Some Recent Feminist Literary Theory," and in Ellen Cronan Rose's 1993 essay "American feminist criticism of contemporary women's fiction," both in Signs: Journal of Women in Culture and Society. Draine cites Frye's chapter on "Feminist Poetics" as an affirmation of "the explanatory possibilities of narrative, to develop new paradigms through which we can see our own experience" and notes the book's emphasis on "the subversive first-person female" to move beyond the language of patriarchy. In the preface, Frye claims "a dual commitment: to the importance of affirming women's own perspective on female experience and to the power of literature in shaping our culture awareness." Rose notes this commitment to literature as "stimulus to personal and social change."

Frye has also been celebrated for her 2012 memoir, Biting the Moon: A Memoir of Feminism and Motherhood, in which she continues the concerns of her critical work and her past, which Frye situates in literary and cultural context.

Frye married Ronald Tebbe in 1989. Her two daughters are teachers and writers; each is the mother of two sons.

== Early life and career ==
Frye was born in South Bend, Indiana, to parents of Mennonite heritage. She graduated from John Adams High School in South Bend, Indiana. She attended Bluffton College in Ohio, studied modernist English literature in graduate school at Indiana University Bloomington. Frye completed her dissertation on Virginia Woolf at Indiana University in 1974.

In 1968, at age 23, a second-year doctoral student in English literature, Frye married Lawrence O. Frye, a German professor ten years her senior. While completing her dissertation, she lived on a farm and gave birth to two daughters, in 1971 and 1975. Following their divorce in 1976, Frye became a single mother to her two daughters. She writes in detail about her life in her memoir, Biting at the Moon: A Memoir of Feminism and Motherhood. Reviewer Marina DelVecchio describes Frye's memoir as a story that "introduces us to a woman who acts with feminist conviction before she even calls herself a feminist—before she establishes a successful Women's Studies program her college."

Frye was hired into the English Department at the College of Wooster in 1976, where she taught courses in writing and literature, including single author courses on Virginia Woolf, Toni Morrison, and Charlotte Brontë; she chaired the English Department from 1991 to 1994. In 1978, Frye led the Committee on the Status of Women in formalizing the Women's Studies Program as a minor. In 1989, she led the program committee to faculty approval of a Women's Studies major. Both proposals were collaborative efforts, building on the work of earlier faculty, including history Professor James Turner.

Frye served as chair of the Women's Studies Program unofficially from 1978 to 1982 and again in 1983–84, and eventually as the first "official" chair of the Program from 1985 to 1989. In 2009, Frye retired from the College of Wooster, where she taught both English and Women's Studies for thirty-three years.

In a 2016 interview with College of Wooster student Alex Kauffman, Frye described her experience founding the Women's Studies Program (now Women's, Gender & Sexuality Studies [WGSS] Program):

Reflecting on these forty years of Women's Studies at Wooster, I am acutely aware of the ongoing importance of studying the force of gender and sexuality in our lives, the intersecting powers of race and class, and the ways in which culture moves in response to concerns with gender. Clearly there is much work to be done, but I take great joy from the recognition that this work carries forward in classrooms at Wooster and in the scholarship of students and faculty here and, now, around the world.

== Career honors ==
- Frye was the Recipient of Luce Grant for Distinguished Scholar-Teacher, during its first grant year, 1982–83, enabling completion of first draft of Living Stories, Telling Lives
- Living Stories, Telling Lives was recipient of the Alice and Edith Hamilton manuscript prize from the University of Michigan, 1984
- Tillie Olsen: A Study of the Short Fiction was selected by Choice as an Outstanding Academic Book, 1996
- Biting the Moon: A Memoir of Feminism and Motherhood was a Finalist for the Nonfiction Ohioana Book Award, 2013

== Selected bibliography ==
=== Books ===
- Living Stories, Telling Lives: Women and the Novel in Contemporary Experience, Ann Arbor: University of Michigan Press, ISBN 0472100734, 1986
- Tillie Olsen: A Study of the Short Fiction, Twayne Publishers, ISBN 0805708634, 1995
- Biting the Moon: A Memoir of Feminism and Motherhood, Syracuse University Press, ISBN 0815609698, 2012

=== Selected Articles and Book Chapters ===
- "The Voyage Out: Thematic Tensions and Narrative Techniques." Twentieth Century Literature 26,4 (winter 1980): pages 402–23.
- "'I Stand Here Ironing': Motherhood as Experience and Metaphor." Studies in Short Fiction 18,3 (summer 1981): pages 187–92.
- "Narrating the Self: The Autonomous Heroine in Gail Godwin's Violet Clay." Contemporary Literature 24,1 (spring 1983): pages 66–85.
- "The Woman Warrior: Claiming Narrative Power, Recreating Female Selfhood." In The Faith of a (Woman) Writer. Edited by Alice Kessler-Harris and William McBrien. New York: Greenwood Press, 1988.
- "The Politics of Reading: Feminism, the Novel, and Cultural Change." Critical Exchange 25 (spring 1988): pages 37–49.
- "Tillie Olsen: Probing the Boundaries between Text and Context." Journal of Narrative and Life History 3 (1993): pages 255–68.
- "Politics, Literary Form, and a Feminist Poetics of the Novel." In Essentials of the Theory of Fiction. Second Edition. Edited by Michael J. Hoffman and Patrick D. Murphy. Durham: Duke University Press, 1996. pages 432–52. (Excerpted from Living Stories, Telling Lives)
- "'Requa I': Intersections of the Real and the Fictional." Frontiers 28,3 (1997): pages 135–40.
- "Placing Children at the Fulcrum of Social Change: Antiracist Mothering in Tillie Olsen's 'O Yes.'" Tulsa Studies in Women's Literature 18,1 (spring 1999): pages 11–28. Reprinted in Short Story Criticism, volume 103 (Thomson Publishing, Gale Group, 2008).
- "Making a Living, Making a Life." Journal of the Association of Research on Mothering 5,2 (fall / winter 2003): pages 21–28.
- "Narrating Maternal Subjectivity: Memoirs from Motherhood," in Textual Mothers, Maternal Texts, ed. Elizabeth Podnieks and Andrea O'Reilly. Wilfrid Laurier University Press, Toronto, 2009.
- "Narrating as a Mother: Experience, Cognition and Narrative Form in Jane Smiley's Ordinary Love and Good Will," in Maternal Thinking: Philosophy, Politics, Practice, ed. Andrea O'Reilly. Demeter Press, York University, Toronto, 2009.
- "Parental Thinking: What Does Gender Have to Do With It?" in Essential Breakthroughs: Conversations about Men, Mothers, and Mothering, ed. Fiona Joy Green and Gary Pelletier. Demeter Press: Bradford, Ontario, 2015.
