= James Atlas =

American writer, biographer, editor, and publisher (1949–2019)

James Robert Atlas (March 22, 1949 – September 4, 2019) was an American writer, biographer, editor, and publisher. He was the president of Atlas & Company and founding editor of the Penguin Lives Series.

== Early life and education ==
Atlas was born in Evanston, Illinois, to Donald and Nora (Glassenberg) Atlas. His father was a physician and his mother was a homemaker. Atlas graduated in 1967 from high school in Evanston, during the turmoil of the 1960s.

He studied at Harvard under Robert Lowell and Elizabeth Bishop with the intention of becoming a poet and graduated with a bachelor's degree. He went to Oxford and studied under the biographer Richard Ellmann, as a Rhodes Scholar. During his time at Oxford he was inspired to become a biographer.

== Career ==
Atlas was a contributor to The New Yorker, but was fired by David Remnick who, along with Philip Roth, disliked him intensely. He was an editor at The New York Times Magazine for many years. He edited volumes of poetry and wrote several novels and two biographies. In 2002, he started Atlas Books, which at one time published two series in conjunction with HarperCollins and W. W. Norton. In 2007, the company was renamed Atlas & Company, to coincide with the launch of its new list. Atlas joined Amazon Publishing and Atlas & Company stopped publishing new titles in 2012.

Atlas's work appeared in The New York Times Book Review, The New York Review of Books, the London Review of Books, Vanity Fair, Harper's Magazine, New York magazine, and The Huffington Post.

== Personal life and death ==
In 1975 he married psychiatrist Dr. Anna Fels. Atlas died in Manhattan, New York on September 4, 2019, from complications of a lung condition. He was survived by his wife and a son, daughter, and grandson.

== Works ==
- Ten American Poets: An Anthology of Poems, Cheadle: Carcanet Press, 1973
- Delmore Schwartz: The Life of an American Poet, New York: Farrar Straus Giroux, 1977 (nominated for the National Book Award)
- The Great Pretender (fiction), New York: Atheneum, 1986.
- Battle of the Books: The Curriculum Debate in America, New York: W.W. Norton, 1993
- Bellow: A Biography, New York: Random House and London: Faber, 2000 (He is also the editor of Saul Bellow's collection of novels in Library of America)
- My Life in the Middle Ages: A Survivor's Tale, New York: HarperCollins, 2005 (An adaptation of a series of articles he did for The New Yorker, and The Great Pretender, a semi-autobiographical novel about coming of age in the 1960s. He is a longtime board member of the Harvard Advocate, which has previously published his work).
- How They See Us: Meditations on America. Atlas. 2009. ISBN 978-1-934633-10-6., (editor) regarding some global views of America.
- The Shadow in the Garden: A Biographer's Tale, New York: Pantheon Books, 2017
