= Partisan Review =

American magazine (1934–2003)

- April–May 1935 issue
- Categories: Literary and political
- Frequency: Quarterly
- Founded: 1934; 92 years ago
- Final issue: April 2003; 23 years ago
- Based in: New York City, U.S.
- Language: English
- ISSN: 0031-2525

Partisan Review (PR) was a left-wing small-circulation quarterly "little magazine" dealing with literature, politics, and cultural commentary published in New York City. The magazine was launched in 1934 by the Communist Party USA–affiliated John Reed Club of New York City and was initially part of the Communist political orbit. Growing disaffection on the part of PR's primary editors began to make itself felt, and the magazine abruptly suspended publication in the fall of 1936. When the magazine reemerged late in 1937, it came with additional editors and new writers who advanced a political line deeply critical of Joseph Stalin's Soviet Union.

By the 1950s, the magazine had evolved towards a moderate social democratic and staunchly anti-Stalinist perspective and was generally supportive of American foreign policy. Partisan Review received covert funding from the Central Intelligence Agency (CIA) during the 1950s and 1960s as part of the agency's efforts to shape intellectual opinion during the Cold War. The journal moved its offices to the campus of Rutgers University in 1963, then to the campus of Boston University in 1978. The final issue of the publication appeared in April 2003.

== Publication history ==
=== Establishment ===
The literary journal Partisan Review (PR) was launched in New York City in 1934 by the John Reed Club of New York — a mass organization of the Communist Party, USA (CPUSA). The publication was published and edited by two members of the New York club, Philip Rahv and William Phillips. The launch of the magazine was assisted by the editors of New Masses, the Communist Party's national artistic and literary magazine, including Joseph Freeman.

Early issues of the magazine included a mixture of ostensibly proletarian literature and essays of cultural commentary — the latter of which became a hallmark of PR for the whole of its nearly seven decades of existence. Rahv and Phillips were strongly committed to the idea that radical new artistic forms and radical politics could be successfully combined and were critical of much of the form and hackneyed content of much of what passed as "proletarian literature". This critical perspective brought the pair into conflict with party stalwarts at the New Masses such as Mike Gold and Granville Hicks but was not sufficient to break Partisan Review from the Communist Party USA (CPUSA) orbit.

In 1936 as part of its Popular Front strategy of uniting Communist and non-Communist intellectuals against fascism, the CPUSA launched a new mass organization called the League of American Writers, abandoning the John Reed Clubs as part of the change. PR editors Phillips and Rahv were disaffected by the change, seeing the new organization as a watering down and mainstreaming of the party's commitment to a new, radical, proletarian literature. Intellectual interest turned to events abroad and interest in PR faltered to the point that effective with its October 1936 issue, publication of the magazine was suspended.

=== 1937 relaunch ===
While Partisan Review was relaunched by Rahv and Phillips in December 1937, it was changed at a fundamental level. News of the Great Purge in the Soviet Union and of Soviet duplicity in the Spanish Civil War pushed the pair of editors to a new outspokenly critical perspective. A new cast of editors were brought on board, including Dwight Macdonald and literary critic F. W. Dupee, and a sympathy for Trotskyism began to make itself felt in the magazine's editorial political line. The CPUSA press was hostile, claiming that a party asset had been stolen. A new group of left-wing writers deeply critical of the Soviet Union began to write for the publication, including James Burnham and Sidney Hook. The new period of independence had begun.

Effective with the Nazi-Soviet Pact of 1939, the magazine began to divorce itself from the Communist movement altogether, including its dissident Trotskyist wing. Rahv and Phillips gave qualified support to the campaign for American rearmament and the country's preparation for war, opposed by Macdonald and another editor at the time, Clement Greenberg. A tentative truce between the editors averted a split, with Macdonald finally departing in 1943 to form the pacifist magazine politics.

Anti-communism began to loom in the raison d'être of Partisan Review in the post-war years and bolstered by the contributions of such writers as Hook, James Farrell, George Orwell, and Arthur Koestler, the political trajectory of PR moved rightwards. Increasingly conservative and nationalist, by the early 1950s the magazine had become devoutly supportive of American virtues and values, although critical of the country's biases and excesses. Orwell had been the Partisan Review's London correspondent.

=== Funding by the CIA ===
Although vehemently denied by founding editor William Phillips, following the fall of the Soviet Union it was revealed that Partisan Review was the recipient of money from the Central Intelligence Agency as part of its effort to shape intellectual opinion in the so-called "cultural cold war". In 1953, the magazine found itself in financial difficulties, when one of its primary backstage financial backers, Allan D. Dowling, became embroiled in a costly divorce proceeding. The financial shortfall was made up by a $2,500 grant from the American Committee for Cultural Freedom (ACCF), a CIA front organization on the executive board of which editor Phillips sat throughout the decade of the 1950s.

Additional CIA money came later in the 1950s. When the ACCF terminated its operations, half of the money remaining in the organization's coffers was transferred to Partisan Review. Additional funds came to the magazine to alleviate its financial problems in the 1950s in the form of a $10,000 donation from Time magazine publisher Henry Luce. Luce seems to have been instrumental in expediting contacts between PR publisher Phillips and Director of Central Intelligence Walter Bedell Smith.

A successor organization established by the CIA to funnel money to sympathetic groups and individuals, the Congress for Cultural Freedom, stepped up to assist the magazine in the early 1960s, granting PR $3,000 a year for a three-year period in the guise of foreign magazine subscriptions.

=== Moves to Rutgers and Boston University ===
In 1963, William Phillips negotiated a move of the editorial offices of Partisan Review to the campus of Rutgers University in New Brunswick, New Jersey. The university agreed to provide not only free office space and utilities, but also to cover the salary of an editor, an assistant editor, a secretary, and various graduate assistants to help with office tasks. In return, the university would gain prestige from association with the well-regarded literary journal and make uses of the services of the editor and assistant editor as lecturers in the school's English Department.

This arrangement proved satisfactory for both parties until June 1978, when Phillips approached the University's then-mandatory faculty retirement age of 70. Learning that no exception would be made for him, Phillips began shopping for a new home for Partisan Review. The decision was ultimately made to relocate the magazine's editorial offices to Boston University, where publication would be continued under the editorship of Phillips and Steven Marcus, with Edith Kurzweil remaining as the magazine's Executive Editor. Under terms of the new hosting agreement, ownership rights of Partisan Review's extensive archive were to be transferred to the new institution.

Having invested more than $1 million in Partisan Review over the years and stored the publication's archive since 1963, Rutgers physically blocked the transfer of PR's files to the new institution. A standoff resulted and attorneys for both parties hastily came to an agreement by which Phillips was allowed to remove back issues, financial files, and current documents necessary for the magazine's publication to Boston University with Rutgers holding the archival originals until the matter could be legally settled. An inventory of the magazine's papers was conducted and photocopies of critical documents made and the matter headed for court.

In the lawsuit which followed, Phillips ultimately prevailing based on his contention that the magazine's records had been housed at Rutgers merely as a revokable "deposit" rather than a permanent gift. Rutgers was allowed to microfilm the magazine's pre-1978 records with the originals were transferred to Boston University.

The magazine's circulation was 8,150 in 1989.

=== Termination and legacy ===
Phillips died in September 2002 at the age of 94. The journal continued under his wife, Edith Kurzweil, at Boston University, until ceasing publication in April 2003.

== Notable contributions ==
- Arendt, Hannah. “Franz Kafka” (1944) and “The Concentration Camps” (1948)
- James Baldwin's "Everybody's Protest Novel" (1949) and also "Sonny's Blues" (1957).
- Saul Bellow's first published work "9 a.m., without Work" in 1941.
- Jorge Luis Borges' "The Zahir" (1950)
- Two of T. S. Eliot's "Four Quartets"
- Clement Greenberg's "Avant-Garde and Kitsch" (1939)
- Tillie Olsen's "I Want You Women up North to Know" (March 1934)
- George Orwell's "Such, Such Were the Joys" (drafted c. 1939, published posthumously, 1952)
- Delmore Schwartz's "In Dreams Begin Responsibilities"
- Susan Sontag's "Notes on 'Camp' " (1964)
- Philip Roth's "His Mistress's Voice" (1986)

== See also ==
- Bibliography of George Orwell
- Congress for Cultural Freedom - CIA program to fund European magazines
