= SS Josephine Shaw Lowell =

World War II Liberty ship of the United States

History

United States
- Name: Josephine Shaw Lowell
- Namesake: Josephine Shaw Lowell
- Owner: War Shipping Administration (WSA)
- Operator: Luckenbach Steamship Co., Ltd.
- Ordered: as type (EC2-S-C1) hull, MC hull 2296
- Builder: J.A. Jones Construction, Panama City, Florida
- Cost: $982,965
- Yard number: 37
- Way number: 3
- Laid down: 19 February 1944
- Launched: 4 April 1944
- Completed: 3 May 1944
- Identification: Call Signal: KWVZ
- Fate: Laid up in National Defense Reserve Fleet, Hudson River Group, 31 May 1946; Sold to Italy, 15 January 1947

Italy
- Name: Albaro
- Owner: Societe Italiana di Navigazione, Albaro, Genoa, Italy
- Acquired: 22 January 1947
- Fate: Sold, 1963

Greece
- Name: Aigaion
- Namesake: Aegean Sea
- Owner: Aegean Cia. Nav., Panama
- Operator: Phoenix Maritime Agencies, New York
- Acquired: 1963
- Fate: Scrapped, 1968

General characteristics
- Class & type: Liberty ship; type EC2-S-C1, standard
- Tonnage: 10,865 LT DWT; 7,176 GRT
- Displacement: 3,380 long tons (3,434 t) (light); 14,245 long tons (14,474 t) (max)
- Length: 441 feet 6 inches (135 m) oa; 416 feet (127 m) pp; 427 feet (130 m) lwl
- Beam: 57 feet (17 m)
- Draft: 27 ft 9.25 in (8.4646 m)
- Installed power: 2 × Oil fired 450 °F (232 °C) boilers, operating at 220 psi (1,500 kPa); 2,500 hp (1,900 kW)
- Propulsion: 1 × triple-expansion steam engine, (manufactured by Iron Fireman Manufacturing Co., Portland, Oregon); 1 × screw propeller
- Speed: 11.5 knots (21.3 km/h; 13.2 mph)
- Capacity: 562,608 cubic feet (15,931 m^{3}) (grain); 499,573 cubic feet (14,146 m^{3}) (bale)
- Complement: 38–62 USMM; 21–40 USNAG
- Armament: Varied by ship; Bow-mounted 3-inch (76 mm)/50-caliber gun; Stern-mounted 4-inch (102 mm)/50-caliber gun; 2–8 × single 20-millimeter (0.79 in) Oerlikon anti-aircraft (AA) cannons and/or, 2–8 × 37-millimeter (1.46 in) M1 AA guns

SS Josephine Shaw Lowell was a Liberty ship built in the United States during World War II. She was named after Josephine Shaw Lowell, a Nineteenth century Progressive Reform leader and creator of the National Consumers League.

== Construction ==
Josephine Shaw Lowell was laid down on 19 February 1944, under a Maritime Commission (MARCOM) contract, MC hull 2296, by J.A. Jones Construction, Panama City, Florida; she was launched on 4 April 1944.

== History ==
She was allocated to Luckenbach Steamship Co., Ltd., on 3 May 1944. On 31 May 1946, she was laid up in the National Defense Reserve Fleet, in the Hudson River Group. On 15 January 1947, she was transferred to the Italian Government, which in turn sold her for $545,601.37 to Societe Italiana di Navigazione, Albaro, Genoa, Italy, on 22 January 1947, for commercial use. She was renamed Albaro. In 1963, she was sold to Aegean Cia. Nav., Panama, and renamed Aigaion. She was scrapped in Osaka, Japan, in 1968.

== Bibliography ==
- "Jones Construction, Panama City FL". www.ShipbuildingHistory.com. 13 October 2010.
- "Liberty Ships – World War II".
- Maritime Administration. "Josephine Shaw Lowell". Ship History Database Vessel Status Card. U.S. Department of Transportation, Maritime Administration. Archived from the original on 12 December 2019.
- Davies, James (May 2004). "Specifications (As-Built)" (PDF). p. 23.
- "SS Josephine Shaw Lowell".
