= For the Union Dead =

1964 poetry collection by Robert Lowell

For The Union Dead
- First edition
- Author: Robert Lowell
- Cover artist: Frank Parker
- Language: English
- Genre: Poetry
- Publisher: Farrar, Straus & Giroux
- Publication date: 1964

For the Union Dead is a book of poems by Robert Lowell that was published by Farrar, Straus & Giroux in 1964. It was Lowell's sixth book.

Notable poems from the collection include "Beyond the Alps'" (a revised version of the poem that originally appeared in Lowell's book Life Studies), "Water," "The Old Flame," "The Public Garden" and the title poem, which is one of Lowell's best-known poems.

== Style and subject ==
The poems from For the Union Dead built upon the more personal, looser style that Lowell had established in Life Studies. For instance, some of the poems are written in free verse or with a loose meter, and some contain irregular rhymes or no rhymes at all.

However, although many of the poems in this volume are personal, their subject matter is different from Life Studies as there are no poems that focus on the subject of Lowell's mental illness. Instead, the more personal poems here focus on Lowell's close family relationships, centering on individuals like his daughter ("Child's Song"), his cousin Harriet Winslow ("Soft Wood"), his father ("Middle Age"), and his ex-wife ("The Old Flame"). However, since these poems do not involve taboo subject matter, they are not as notably "confessional" as some of the poems in Life Studies. The closest that Lowell comes to addressing his mental illness is in the poem "Eye and Tooth" when, in the final line, he writes, "I am tired. Everyone's tired of my turmoil."

Other notable subjects in these poems include Lowell's childhood ("Those Before Us" and "The Neo-Classical Urn") and famous historical figures like Caligula (in "Caligula") and Jonathan Edwards (in "Jonathan Edwards in Western Massachusetts"), bringing multiple world history subjects to the book. Historical subjects would later become the main focus of his book History, published a few years later.

In comparison with Life Studies, Lowell stated, "For the Union Dead is more mixed [with different kinds of poems] and the poems are separate entities. I'm after invention rather than memory, and I'd like to achieve some music and elegance and splendor, but not in any programmatic sense. Some of the poems may be close to symbolism."

== "For the Union Dead" (poem) ==
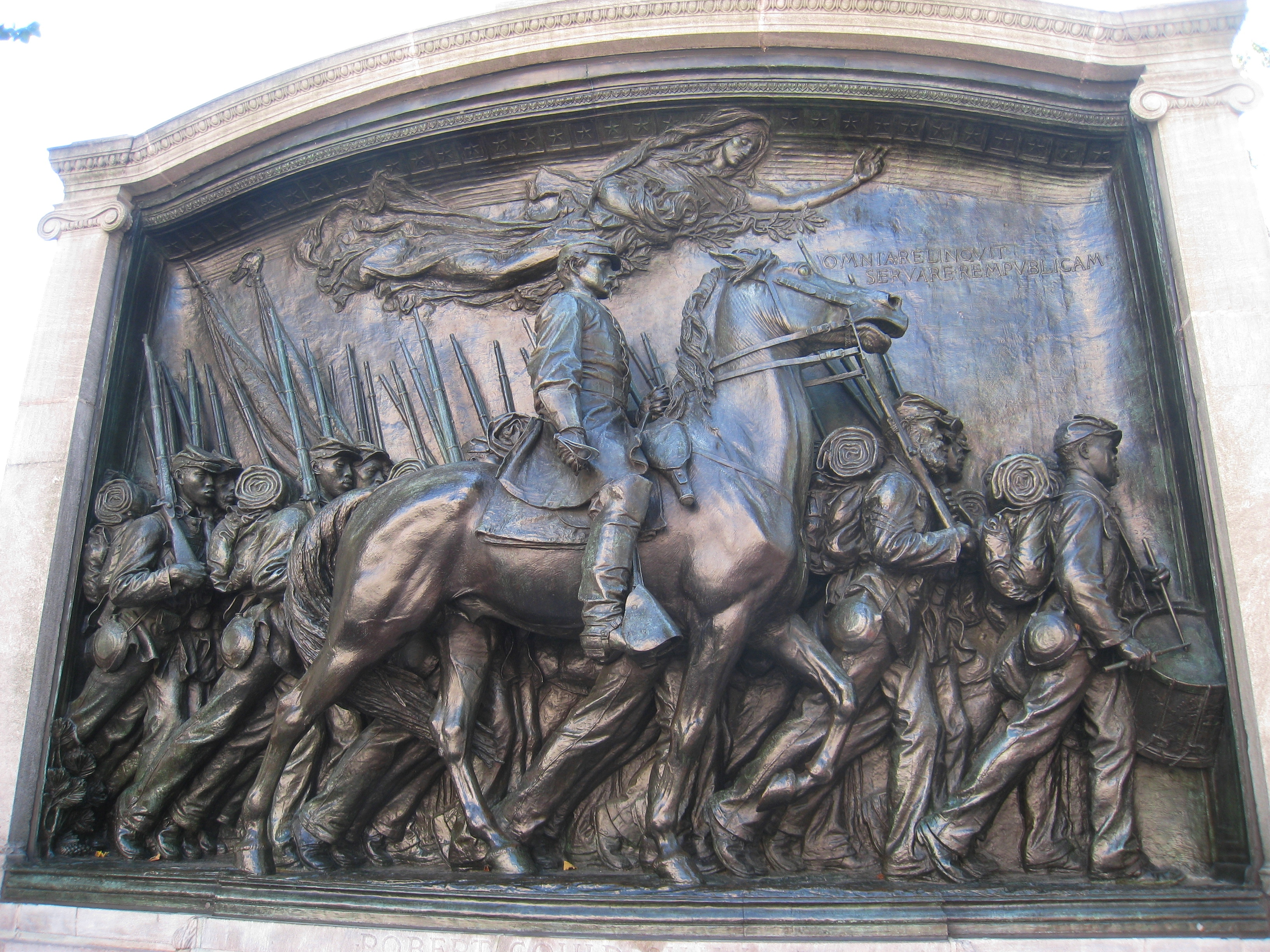
Memorial to Robert Gould Shaw and the 54th Massachusetts Volunteer Infantry Regiment in Boston that figures prominently in Lowell's poem "For the Union Dead"

Lowell originally wrote the poem "For the Union Dead" for the Boston Arts Festival in 1960 where he first read it in public. The title refers to the 1928 poem "Ode to the Confederate Dead", by Lowell's former teacher and mentor Allen Tate. At the 1960 festival, Lowell said, "Writing is neither transport nor a technique. My own owes everything to a few of our poets who have tried to write directly about what mattered to them, and yet to keep faith with their calling's tricky, specialized, unpopular possibilities for good workmanship. When I finished Life Studies, I was left hanging on a question mark. I don't know whether it is a deathrope or a lifeline."

The setting of "For the Union Dead" is the Boston Common, near the well-known Robert Gould Shaw Memorial by Augustus Saint-Gaudens. In the poem, Lowell's visit to the park, which is being excavated to provide an underground car park, conjures up a series of associations. First, watching the construction of the garage beneath the Common makes him think about his childhood and how Boston had changed; in particular, the South Boston Aquarium, that he'd visited as a child, had been demolished a few years before, in 1954. This leads him to think about the Robert Gould Shaw Memorial and the history associated with the memorial, specifically, the story of Colonel Robert Gould Shaw and the all-black 54th Massachusetts Volunteer Infantry that he led during the Civil War. Finally, Lowell thinks of the then-controversial Civil Rights Movement and the images of the integration of black and white school-children that Lowell had recently seen on television.

The final lines of the poem, which read, "The Aquarium is gone. Everywhere,/ giant finned cars nose forward like fish;/ a savage servility/ slides by on grease" are particularly well known for their rather dark description of the large American cars that were popular at the time, evoking a corrupted consumer society without heroism.

== "The Public Garden" ==
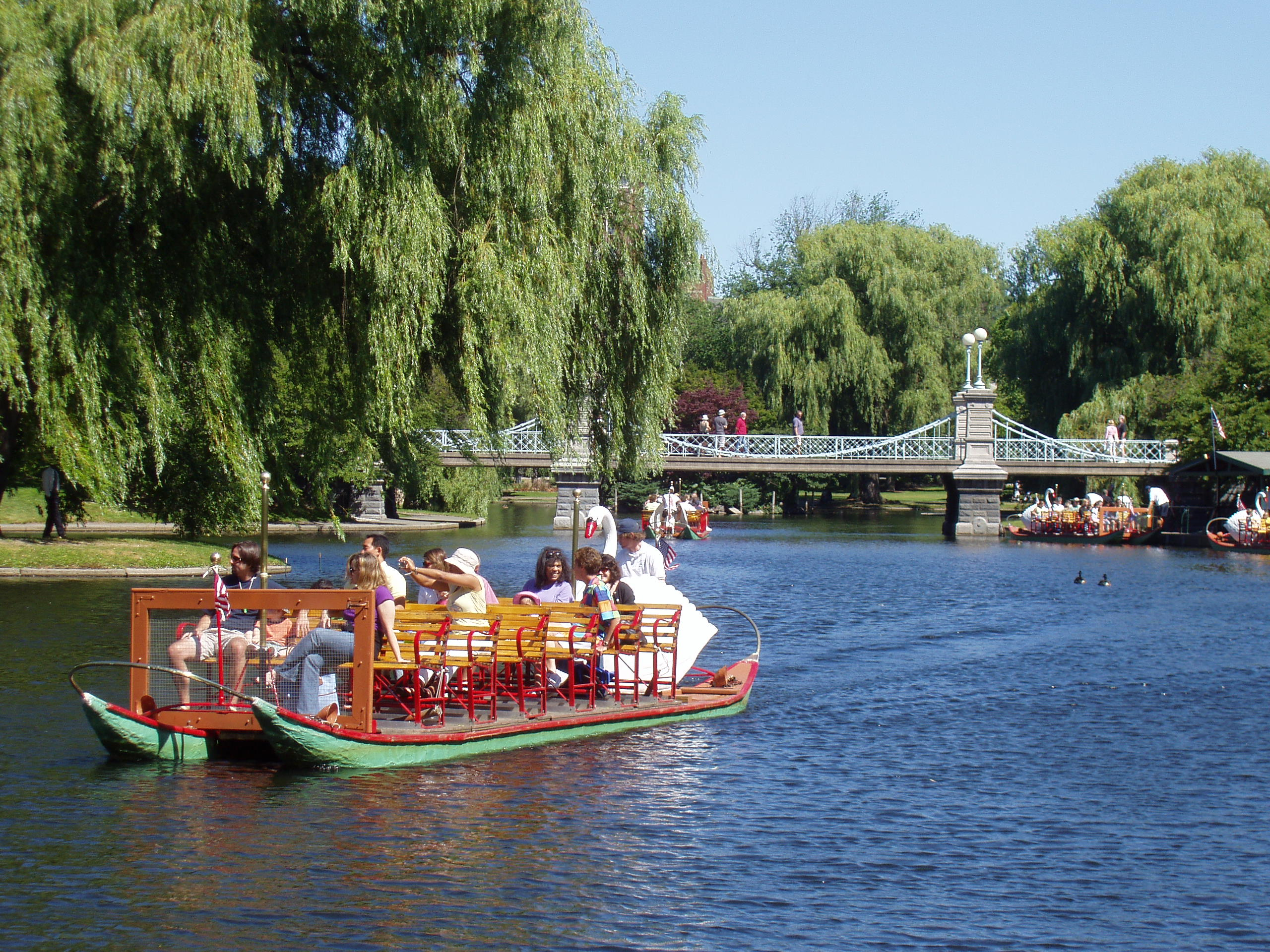
The Public Garden in Boston is the setting for the poem "The Public Garden."

"The Public Garden" is a revised version of the poem "David and Bathsheba in the Public Garden" which was originally published in Lowell's third book The Mills of the Kavanaughs. In the version in For the Union Dead, Lowell completely removed from the poem any mention of the Biblical characters of David and Bathsheba who were central to the earlier version. During Lowell's 1963 public reading at the Guggenheim, prior to the publication of For the Union Dead, he explained that many of his readers expressed confusion over the presence of the Biblical characters being located in a modern park in Boston, and according to Lowell, the characters made the poem "impenetrable." The revised version of the poem was both shorter and more personal with Lowell (or the poem's narrator) and his lover taking the place of David and Bathsheba.

== Response ==
The public reception of For the Union Dead was generally positive.

In The New York Times, G. S. Fraser wrote that, "the book seems to me the most powerful and direct volume of poems [Lowell] has yet published". In Time magazine, a book review stated, "Lowell is the poet par excellence of the particular . . . [and] the poetry [in For The Union Dead] lives—images linger in the mind, the thing described is seen with stunning clarity". However, Time criticized Lowell for his poetry's "occasional obscurity".
