= Beyond the Alps =

Poem by Robert Lowell

"Beyond the Alps" is a poem by Robert Lowell.

== Overview ==
According to Saskia Hamilton, the editor of Lowell's Letters, Lowell wrote the original version of the poem in 1952.

The poem was inspired by a trip to Europe that he took with his second wife Elizabeth Hardwick. It documents his journey, by train, through the Alps, from Rome to Paris in 1950 and captures his feelings towards his waning faith in Catholicism. Evidence of this interpretation can be heard at Lowell's 1963 poetry reading at the Guggenheim Museum, when he introduced his reading of "Beyond the Alps" by stating that, "[the poem was] a declaration of my faith or lack of faith." He has stated that "the poem is about people who go beyond nature... Mussolini or the Pope.... What [the poem] means theologically, I think, is impenetrable."

The poem begins Lowell's Life Studies and this is significant because it marks a break from his previous books which were written while Lowell was much more serious, even fervent, about his Catholic faith (and a recent convert as well).

== Multiple versions ==
Lowell published three different versions of this poem. The poem originally appeared in Kenyon Review in 1953. Then, Lowell published a significantly revised version in his book, Life Studies (1959) in which two major stanzas were removed. However, Lowell was still not satisfied with the poem and republished it one more time, with slight revisions, in For the Union Dead (1964).

The main difference between the version of the poem in Life Studies and the one in For the Union Dead, is the re-introduction of a stanza from the magazine version that begins, "I thought of Ovid." Lowell stated in an "Introductory Note" to For the Union Dead, that he "restored [the stanza] at the suggestion of John Berryman."

There are also additional minor differences between the two book versions of the poem. For instance, "Life changed to landscape" becomes "Man changed to landscape." Lowell also made minor changes in punctuation.

The editors of the Collected Poems note that Lowell's poem "Ovid and Caesar's Daughter," from his book History, "is a revision of stanza three [from the version of "Beyond the Alps" in For the Union Dead".

== Cultural references ==
Lowell refers to:

- Pope Pius XII and his defining the dogma of Mary's bodily assumption (declared November 1950).
- A Swiss attempt to climb Mount Everest (attempts actually made in May 1952 & the autumn of 1952 by Raymond Lambert).
- Benito Mussolini, 'The Duce'
- The golden bough that Aeneas used to ensure safe passage through the underworld.
- Ovid
- Minerva who was born from the head of Zeus.
