= Skunk Hour =

1958 poem by Robert Lowell

'Skunk Hour' is one of Robert Lowell's most frequently anthologized poems. It was published in his groundbreaking book of poems, Life Studies, and is regarded as a key early example of Confessional poetry.

== Composition ==
'Skunk Hour' was the final poem in Life Studies, but it was the first to be completed. Lowell began work on the poem in August 1957, and the poem was first published, alongside the poems "Man and Wife" and "Memories of West Street and Lepke" in the January 1958 issue of the Partisan Review.

He describes the writing of it thus: "I began writing lines in a new style. No poem, however, got finished and soon I left off and tried to forget the whole headache. ... When I began writing 'Skunk Hour', I felt that most of what I knew about writing was a hindrance. The dedication is to Elizabeth Bishop, because re-reading her suggested a way of breaking through the shell of my old manner." The poem was in part based on Bishop's poem "Armadillo" and Lowell wrote that "her rhythms, idiom, images, and stanza structure seemed to belong to a later century... Both 'Skunk Hour' and 'The Armadillo' use short line stanzas, start with drifting description, and end with a single animal."

In the same essay, Lowell describes the setting as "a declining Maine sea town. I move from the ocean inland."

== Interpretation ==
During his Guggenheim Reading from 1963, Lowell notes that there have been conflicting interpretations of the final image of skunks in the poem. He states that "Richard Wilbur said that [the skunks] were delightful creatures. . . and John Berryman wrote. . .[that the skunks] were utterly terrifying, catatonic creatures." Lowell concludes that "both [interpretations] could be right."

Lowell provides an explanation for the poem's structure as well as his reasoning for the composition's dark tone: "The first four stanzas are meant to give a dawdling more or less amiable picture of a declining Maine sea town. I move from the ocean inland. Sterility howls through the scenery, but I try to give a tone of tolerance, humor, and randomness to the sad prospect. The composition drifts, its direction sinks out of sight into the casual, chancy arrangements of nature and decay. Then all comes alive in stanzas V and VI. This is the dark night. I hoped my readers would remember St. John of the Cross's poem. My night is not gracious, but secular, puritan, and agnostical. An Existentialist night."

== Sources ==
- Robert Lowell: Interviews and Memoirs, edited by Jeffrey Meyers, University of Michigan, 1988
- Twentieth-Century American Poetry by Christopher Beach, Cambridge University Press, 2003
