= Sarah Blake Sturgis Shaw =

American abolitionist, women's rights supporter, anti-imperialist and philanthropist

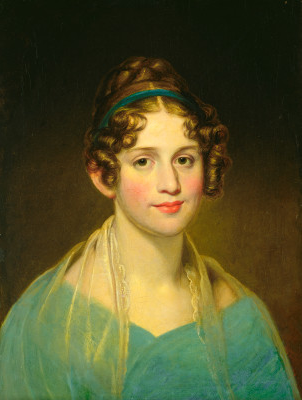
- Portrait from 1835 by Francis Alexander
- Born: Sarah Blake Sturgis; August 31, 1815; Boston, Massachusetts, U.S.
- Died: December 31, 1902 (aged 87); Manhattan, New York City, U.S.
- Spouse: Francis George Shaw
- Children: Robert Gould Shaw, Josephine Shaw Lowell

Sarah Blake Shaw (née Sturgis; August 31, 1815 – December 31, 1902) was an American abolitionist, women's rights supporter, anti-imperialist and philanthropist.

== Biography ==
Shaw was the daughter of Bostonians Nathaniel Russell Sturgis (1779–1856) and Susannah Thomsen Parkman. She was the younger sister of merchant Russell Sturgis. She married Francis George of Clan Shaw on June 9, 1835. Shortly after their marriage, the Shaws became members of the Boston Society of the New Jerusalem—a part of The Church of The New Jerusalem (Swedenborgian or New Church). Church records indicate they keep their membership active at a distance through the 1890s). Some scholars have written it was a "part of the 'evangelical' wing of the Unitarian Church;" however, they are not accurate.

In 1838, they joined the American Anti-Slavery Society and would later become founding members of the Unitarian Church in Staten Island, New York. The mother of Robert Gould Shaw and Josephine Shaw Lowell, Sarah Blake Shaw died at age 87 on December 31, 1902.

Of her personality and intellect, author William Rhinelander Stewart wrote, "Whatever things were best in art, literature, or music instantly appealed to her, and were loved from the time she first saw or heard them; and with the aid of a retentive memory, she was able even towards the close of a life prolonged to her eighty-seventh year to recite whole pages of Shakespeare and Milton, her favorite poets." And from the pen of Century Magazine editor Richard Watson Gilder, a poem —

Mother of heroes, she—of them who gave
Their lives to lift the lowly, free the slave.
Her, through long years, two master passions bound:
Love of our free land; and of all sweet sound.
'T was praising her to praise this land of grace;
And when I think on music—lo, her face!
