= Commander Lowell =

1959 poem by Robert Lowell

Commander Lowell is a poem by American poet Robert Lowell in his 1959 collection Life Studies. It is a portrait of Lowell's father as a complex character. The poem mentions that the Commander gave away naval life to take up a better paid position with soap manufacturers Lever Brothers;. He was inept in civilian life, a poor golf player and a failure in business: "in three years he squandered sixty thousand dollars". The last lines of the poem - And once/nineteen, the youngest ensign in his class,/he was "the old man" of a gunboat on the Yangtze - were described by Stephen Yenser as banishing "the humor of condescension that is accorded a Quixote."
