= Robert Gould Shaw Memorial =

Sculpture by Augustus Saint-Gaudens in Boston, Massachusetts, U.S.

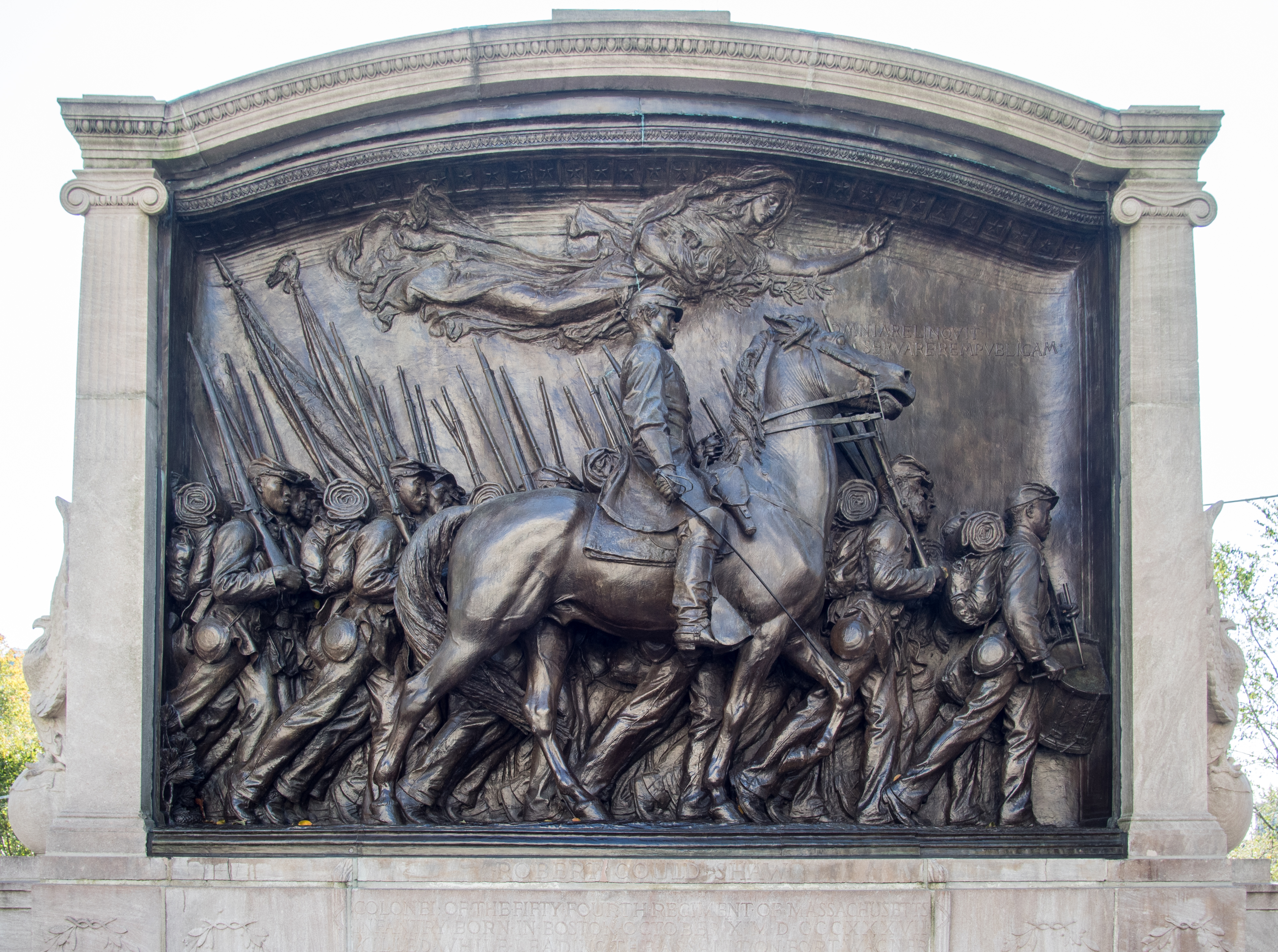
- Artist: Augustus Saint-Gaudens
- Year: 1884
- Type: Bronze
- Dimensions: 3.4 m × 4.3 m (11 ft × 14 ft)
- Location: Boston, Massachusetts, U.S.; 42°21′27″N 71°3′48.6″W
- Owner: National Park Service

The Memorial to Robert Gould Shaw and the Massachusetts Fifty-Fourth Regiment is a bronze relief sculpture by Augustus Saint-Gaudens opposite 24 Beacon Street, Boston (at the edge of the Boston Common). It depicts Colonel Robert Gould Shaw leading members of the 54th Regiment Massachusetts Volunteer Infantry as it marched down Beacon Street on May 28, 1863, to depart the city to fight in the South. The sculpture was unveiled on May 31, 1897. This is the first civic monument to pay homage to the heroism of African American soldiers.

== History ==
The monument marks Shaw's death on July 18, 1863, after he and his troops attacked Fort Wagner, one of two forts protecting the strategic Confederate port of Charleston, South Carolina. Joshua Bowen Smith, a Massachusetts state legislator, led the effort to obtain authorization for the monument; others participating in its early planning included Governor John Albion Andrew, who had urged Shaw to take command of the 54th Regiment, Samuel Gridley Howe, and Senator Charles Sumner. The monument was meant to show the public's gratitude to Shaw and commemorate the events that recognized the citizenship of Black men.

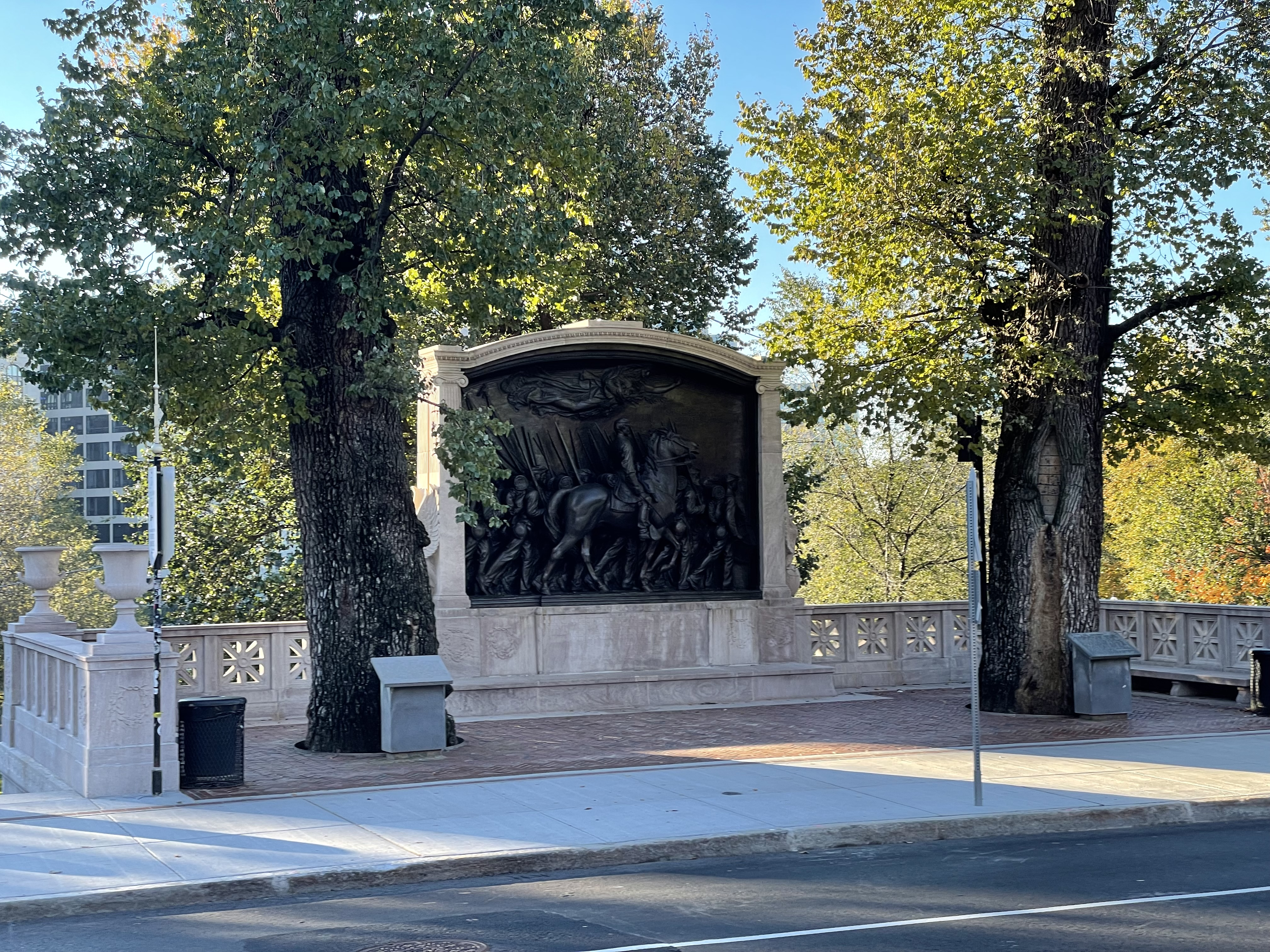
The Robert Gould Shaw Memorial after the completed restoration project in 2021.

In celebrating Shaw, Saint-Gaudens depicted Shaw on horseback, while the Massachusetts 54th is depicted in bas-relief, thus creating a "stylistically unprecedented" and "hybrid" work that modifies the traditional Western equestrian monument. Saint-Gaudens would later draw upon this new model in his 1903 memorial to William T. Sherman in New York's Central Park. Each of the twenty-three Black soldiers is rendered with distinct, individualistic features that were based on those of live models hired by Saint-Gaudens.

Fundraising for the monument, led by the survivors of the 54th Massachusetts Volunteer Infantry and emancipated Black people from Beaufort, South Carolina, began immediately after the battle, but funds were redirected because the Beaufort site was found unsuitable and local white people expressed resentment.

The monument was vandalized in 2012, 2015, and 2017. On May 31, 2020, as part of the 2020 George Floyd protests, the back of the monument was vandalized with phrases such as "Black Lives Matter", "ACAB," and "Fuck 12". As part of a renovation plan, the front had been covered with plywood, which also received graffiti. In July 2020, the monument became a focus of discussion during the iconoclasm that took place as part of the George Floyd protests.

Restoration of the monument began on May 20, 2020, and was completed in March 2021. The memorial was removed and taken to an offsite location for restoration. While the bronze sculpture was being cleaned and repaired, a new concrete foundation was built. The project cost $2.8 million and includes an augmented reality mobile app that assists visitors in experiencing the monument. New signage was added detailing the history of the Civil War, the 54th Regiment, and the monument itself, with QR codes for the AR app.

In November 2023, a copy of the monument in the National Gallery of Art was damaged by a climate activist.

== Dedications and inscriptions ==
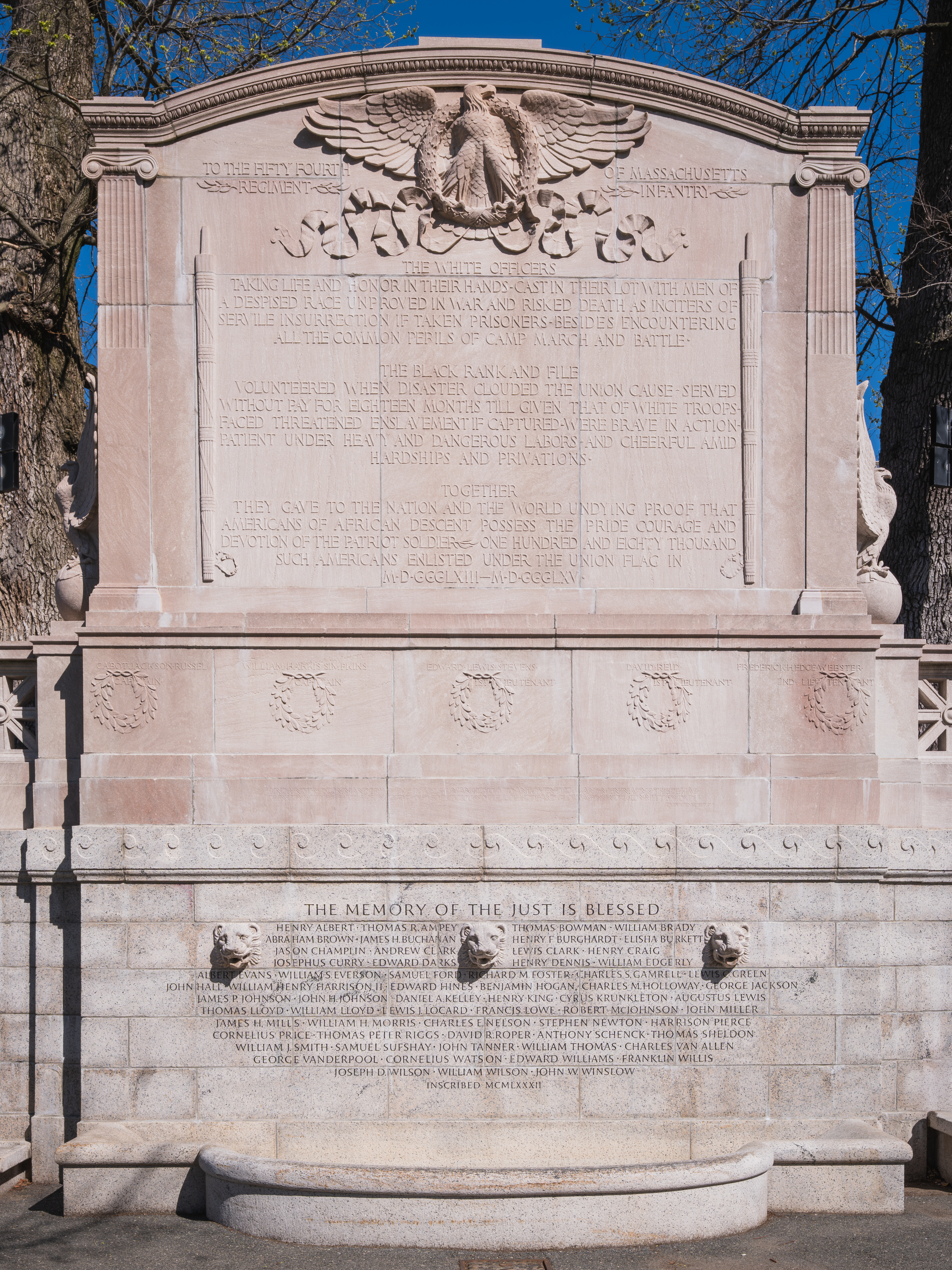
Inscription on the back of the Memorial

The work was dedicated by philosopher William James of Harvard:

There they march, warm-blooded champions of a better day for man. There on horseback, among them, in his very habit as he lived, sits the blue-eyed child of fortune, upon whose happy youth every divinity had smiled.

— Oration by William James at the exercises in the Boston Music Hall, May 31, 1897, upon the unveiling of the Shaw Monument.

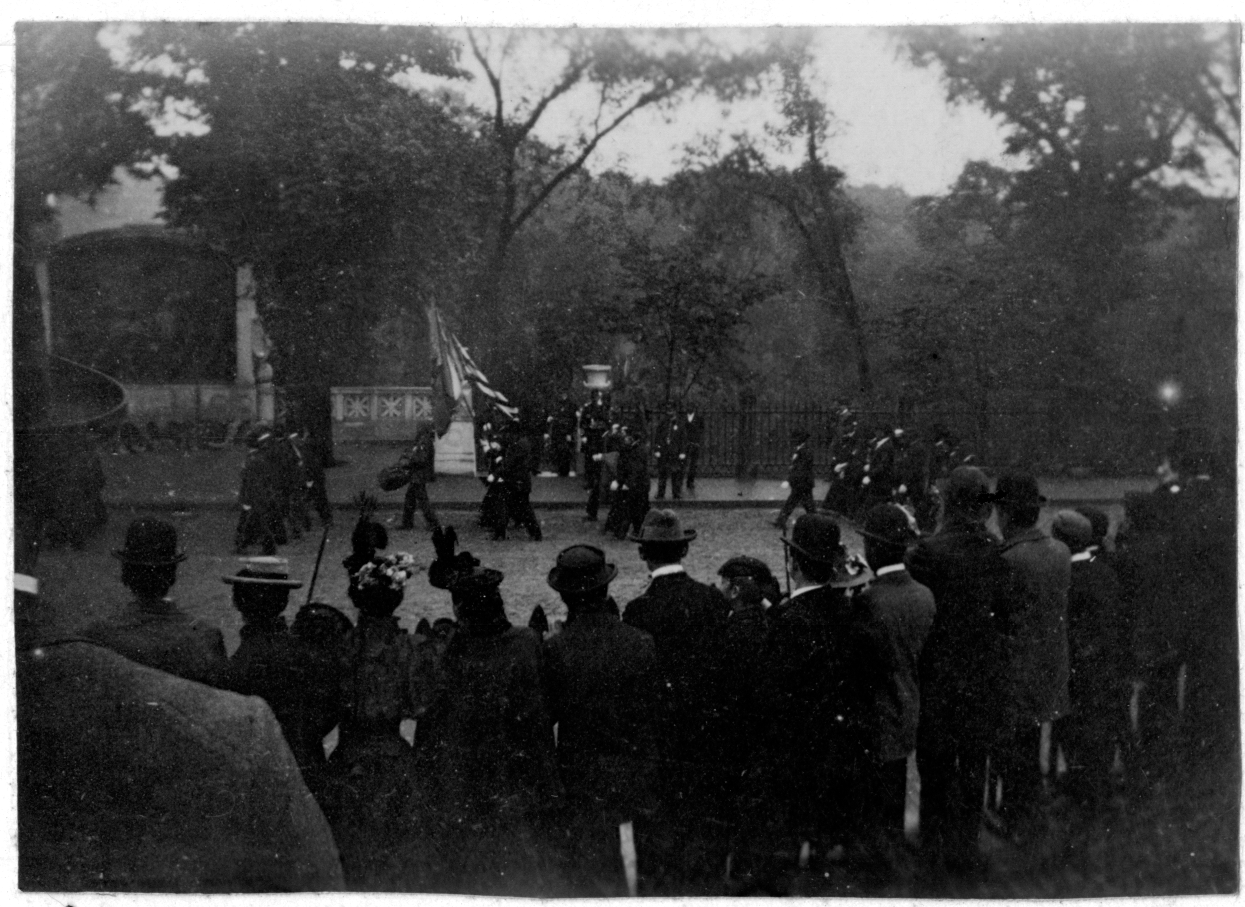
Photograph possibly taken by Augusta H. Saint-Gaudens (wife of the sculptor) of the unveiling ceremony of the Robert Gould Shaw Memorial.

A Latin inscription on the relief reads OMNIA RELINQVIT / SERVARE REMPVBLICAM ("He left behind everything to save the Republic"). The pedestal below carries lines from James Russell Lowell's poem "Memoriae Positum":

Right in the van of the red rampart's slippery
swell with heart that beat a charge he fell
foeward as fits a man: but the high soul burns
on to light men's feet where death for noble
ends makes dying sweet.

On the rear are words by Charles W. Eliot, president of Harvard University:

The White Officers taking life and honor in their hands cast in their lot with men of a despised race unproven in war and risked death as inciters of servile insurrection if taken prisoners besides encountering all the common perils of camp march and battle. The Black rank and file volunteered when disaster clouded the Union Cause. Served without pay for eighteen months till given that of white troops. Faced threatened enslavement if captured. Were brave in action. Patient under heavy and dangerous labors. And cheerful amid hardships and privations. Together they gave to the Nation and the World undying proof that Americans of African descent possess the pride, courage and devotion of the patriot soldier. One hundred and eighty thousand such Americans enlisted under the Union Flag in MDCCCLXIII–MDCCCLXV. [1863-1865]

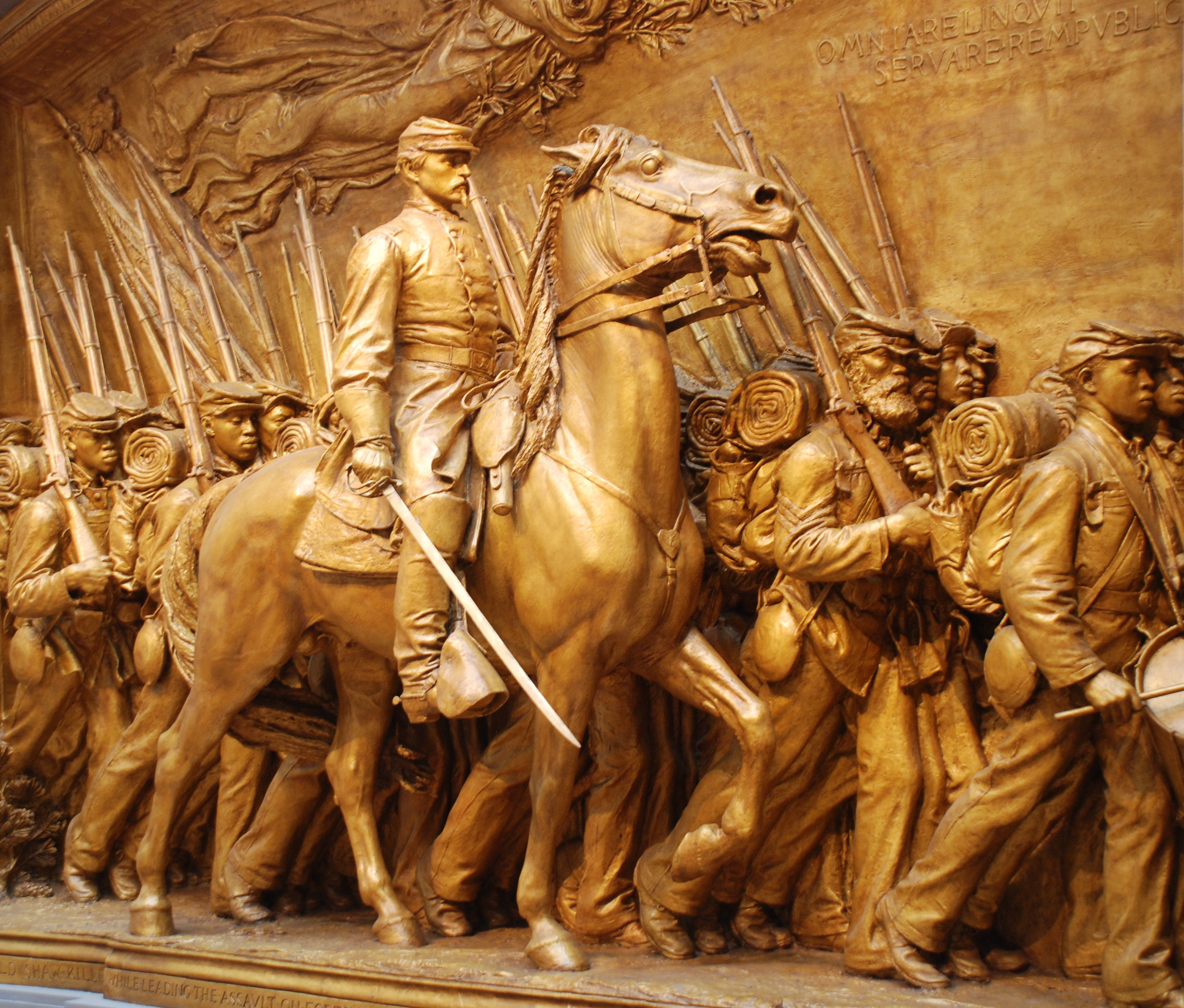
Restored plaster cast at the National Gallery of Art

A plaster cast, which was exhibited at the 1901 Pan-American Exposition, is displayed at the National Gallery of Art, on loan by the Saint-Gaudens National Historic Site, Cornish, New Hampshire. The inscription running along the bottom of this plaster cast incorrectly states that the assault on Fort Wagner and Shaw's death in 1863 occurred "JULY TWENTY THIRD," five days later than the historic events.

== In popular culture ==
- William Vaughn Moody describes Shaw and the monument in the poem "An Ode in Time of Hesitation."
- The "St. Gaudens" in Boston Common (Col. Shaw and his Colored Regiment), is the first movement of Three Places in New England (1903–1929), by Charles Ives.
- Robert Lowell's "For the Union Dead", the title poem of a 1964 collection by the same name, refers to the monument in the poem. The first edition of the book featured a drawing of the relief on the cover.
- The memorial is shown during the closing credits of the 1989 film, Glory, directed by Edward Zwick, which is about Shaw and the Massachusetts 54th Regiment.
- The memorial was used as the background for the 1998 U.S. postage stamp honoring author and poet Stephen Vincent Benét on the 100th anniversary of his birth.
- Route One/USA shows a group of southern girls visiting and being told about the history by a local guide.
