= Home After Three Months Away =

1959 poem by Robert Lowell

'Home After Three Months Away' is one of several "confessional" poems by Robert Lowell which appeared in his book Life Studies.

== Background ==
The poem was written after Lowell started returning home for weekends from the McLean Hospital, where he was being treated for mental illness, in Belmont, Boston in early 1958. Lowell was finally released from McLean in June 1959.

Ian Hamilton, who wrote a biography on Lowell, suggests that the poem owes something to W.D. Snodgrass' poem "Heart's Needle" since "Heart's Needle," which came out prior to Life Studies, focused on Snodgrass' relationship with his child. Although "Home After Three Months Away" is really about Lowell's struggle to recover from a mental breakdown, the narrative of the poem focuses on his relationship with his daughter, Harriet.

== Content ==
He begins the poem by noting the absence of his daughter's former caretaker; then he describes his interactions with his daughter as he's bathing her. But by the end of the poem, he is focused on the subject of his fragile mental state which he compares to the flowers in the garden: "Bushed by the late spring snow,/ they cannot meet/ another year's snowballing enervation." Lowell concludes the poem with the line, "Cured, I am frizzled, stale, and small." The line implies that the treatments he received at McLean Hospital left him feeling worse.
