= Waking in the Blue =

1959 poem by Robert Lowell

"Waking in the Blue" is a poem by Robert Lowell that was published in his book Life Studies and is a striking, early example of confessional poetry. Of the handful of poems from Life Studies in which Lowell explored his struggles with mental illness, this poem was one of Lowell's most forthright admissions that he was mentally ill. Though he does not discuss the exact nature of his mental illness in the poem, he does describe his hospitalization in a mental institution. Lowell's admission of having spent time in a mental institution was considered a brave one to make when he published the poem in 1959, when public disclosure of mental illness was a serious social taboo.

== Composition ==
Lowell wrote the first draft of the poem at the end of January 1958 while at the McLean Hospital in Belmont near Boston. The title of that first draft was "To Ann Adden (Written during the first week of my voluntary stay at McLean's Mental Hospital)". Ann Adden was a "psychiatric fieldworker" whom he had met while he was a patient at the Boston Psychopathic Hospital the previous year. In a manic state, Lowell became temporarily convinced that he was in love with her.

The first draft was formally loose. However, the final draft was 25 lines shorter and in places rhyme and snatches of regular meter were introduced to tighten up the poem.

== Cultural references ==
- The Meaning of Meaning is a book by the literary theorists I. A. Richards and C. K. Ogden
- The Porcellian Club at Harvard
