= Robert Gould Shaw =

Union Army officer (1837–1863)

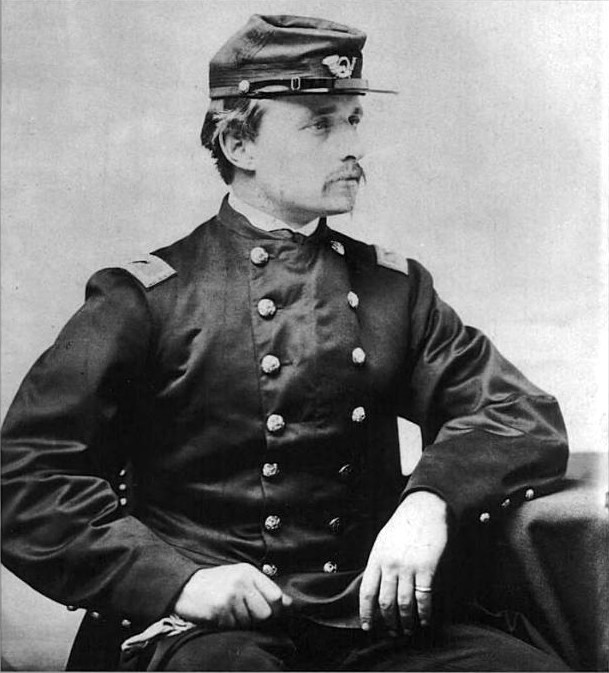
- Shaw in May 1863
- Born: October 10, 1837; Dartmouth, Massachusetts, U.S.
- Died: July 18, 1863 (aged 25); Charleston County, South Carolina, U.S.
- Burial place: Beaufort National Cemetery
- Military career
- Allegiance: United States of America
- Branch: U.S. Army (Union Army)
- Service years: 1861–1863
- Rank: Colonel
- Units: 7th New York Militia; 2nd Regiment Massachusetts Volunteer Infantry
- Commands: 54th Massachusetts Infantry Regiment
- Conflicts: American Civil War: Battle of Antietam; Battle of Grimball's Landing; Second Battle of Fort Wagner †

Robert Gould Shaw (October 10, 1837 – July 18, 1863) was an American officer in the Union Army during the American Civil War. Born into an abolitionist family from the Boston upper class, he accepted command of the first all-black regiment (the 54th Massachusetts) in the Northeast. Advocating the promised equal treatment for his troops, he encouraged the men to refuse their pay until it was equal to that of white troops' wage.

He led his regiment at the Second Battle of Fort Wagner in July 1863. They attacked a beachhead near Charleston, South Carolina, and Shaw was shot and killed while leading his men to the parapet of the Confederate-held fort. Although the regiment was overwhelmed by fire from the defenses and driven back while suffering many casualties, Shaw's leadership and the regiment became legendary and helped lead to more than one hundred thousand additional African Americans to enlist in the Union army. The story of Shaw and his regiment were dramatized in the 1989 Oscar-winning film Glory.

== Early life and education ==
Shaw was born in Dartmouth, Massachusetts, to abolitionists Francis George and Sarah Blake (Sturgis) Shaw, well-known Unitarian philanthropists and intellectuals. The Shaws had the benefit of a large inheritance left by Shaw's merchant grandfather and namesake Robert Gould Shaw (1775–1863). Shaw had four sisters: Anna, Josephine (Effie), Susanna, and Ellen (Nellie).

When Shaw was five years old, the family moved to a large estate in West Roxbury, adjacent to Brook Farm, which he visited with his father. During his teens he traveled and studied for some years in Europe. In 1847, the family moved to Staten Island, New York, and settled among a community of literati and abolitionists while Shaw attended preparatory school at the Second Division of St. John's College (now Fordham Preparatory School at Fordham University). These studies were at the behest of his uncle Joseph Coolidge Shaw, who had been ordained as a Roman Catholic priest in 1847. He converted to Catholicism during a trip to Rome, in which he befriended several members of the Oxford Movement, which had begun in the Anglican Church. Robert began his high school-level education at St. John's in 1850, the same year that Joseph Shaw began studying there for entrance into the Jesuits.

In 1851, while Shaw was still at St. John's, his uncle died from tuberculosis. Aged 13, Shaw had a difficult time adjusting to his surroundings and wrote several despondent letters home to his mother. In one of his letters, he claimed to be so homesick that he often cried in front of his classmates. While at St. John's, he studied Latin, Greek, French, and Spanish, and practiced playing the violin, which he had begun as a young boy.

He left St. John's in late 1851 before graduation, as the Shaw family departed for an extended tour of Europe. Shaw entered a boarding school in Neuchâtel, Switzerland, where he stayed for two years. Afterward, his father transferred him to a school with a less strict system of discipline in Hanover, Germany, hoping that it would better suit his restless temperament. While in Hanover, Shaw enjoyed the greater degree of personal freedom at his new school, on one occasion writing home to his mother, "It's almost impossible not to drink a good deal, because there is so much good wine here."

While Shaw was studying in Europe, Harriet Beecher Stowe, an abolitionist friend of his parents, published her novel Uncle Tom's Cabin (1852). Shaw read the book multiple times and was moved by its plot and anti-slavery attitude. Around the same time, Shaw wrote that his patriotism was bolstered after encountering several instances of anti-Americanism among some Europeans. He expressed interest to his parents in attending West Point or joining the Navy. Because Shaw had a longstanding difficulty with taking orders and obeying authority figures, his parents did not view this ambition seriously.

Shaw returned to the United States in 1856. From 1856 until 1859 he attended Harvard University, joining the Porcellian Club and the Hasty Pudding Club, but he withdrew before graduating. He would have been a member of the class of 1860. Shaw found Harvard no easier to adjust to than any of his previous schools and wrote to his parents about his discontent.

After leaving Harvard in 1859, Shaw returned to Staten Island to work with one of his uncles at the mercantile firm Henry P. Sturgis and Company. He found work life at the company office as disagreeable as some of his other experiences.

== American Civil War ==
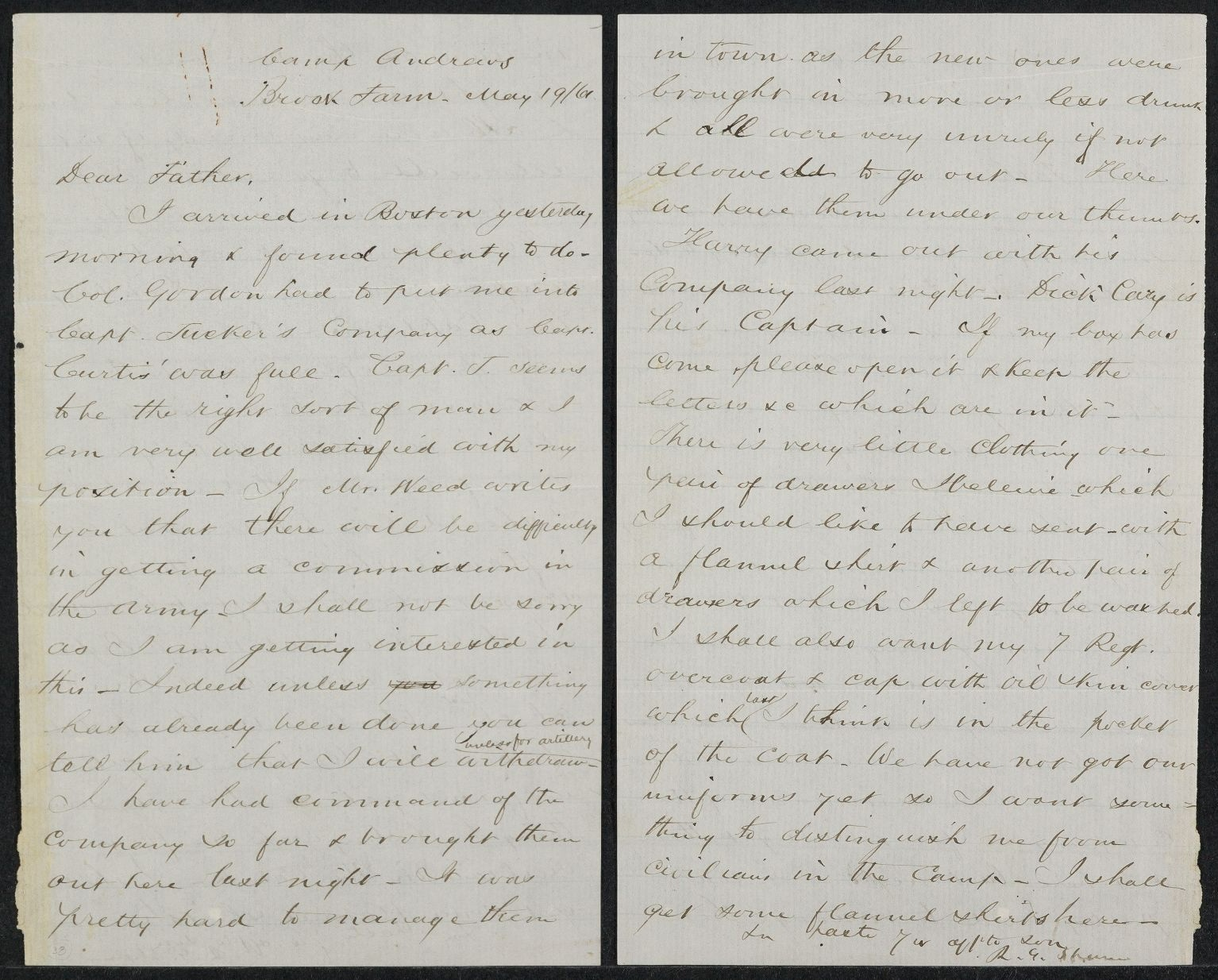
Letter from Robert Gould Shaw to his father from Camp Andrew, May 1861

With the outbreak of the American Civil War, Shaw volunteered to serve with the 7th New York Militia. On April 19, 1861, Private Shaw marched down Broadway in Lower Manhattan as his unit traveled south to man the defense of Washington, D.C. Lincoln's initial call-up asked volunteers to make a 90-day commitment, and after three months Shaw's new regiment was dissolved. Following this, Shaw joined a newly forming regiment from his home state, the 2nd Massachusetts Infantry.

On May 28, 1861, Shaw was commissioned as a second lieutenant in the regiment's Company H. Over the next year and a half, he fought with his fellow Massachusetts soldiers in the first Battle of Winchester, the Battle of Cedar Mountain, and at the bloody Battle of Antietam. Shaw served both as a line officer in the field and as a staff officer for General George H Gordon. Twice wounded, by the fall of 1862 he was promoted to the rank of captain.

Since the start of the war, abolitionists such as Massachusetts governor John A. Andrew urged enlistment of African Americans as soldiers to fight the Confederacy. This proposal was broadly opposed. Many men believed that African American troops would lack discipline, be difficult to train, and would break and run in battle. The general attitude in the North was that African American troops would prove to be an embarrassment and hindrance to regular army units.

Andrew traveled to Washington, D.C., in early January 1863 to meet with Secretary of War Edwin Stanton and repeat his argument for the use of African American troops in the Union army. Stanton was won to his side; on January 26, 1863, Stanton issued an order to Andrew to raise further volunteer regiments to fight for the Union, adding the new recruits "may include persons of African descent, organized into special corps." Andrew immediately set about doing so, and the 54th Massachusetts Volunteer Infantry began to be formed.

For the unit's officers, Andrew sought a certain type of white gentleman,

young men of military experience, of firm antislavery principles, ambitious, superior to a vulgar contempt for color, and having faith in the capacity of colored men for military service.

Most importantly, he wanted men who understood the stakes, that the success or failure of the endeavor would elevate or depress the manner in which the character of African Americans were viewed throughout the world for many years to come. Andrew wrote to many individuals prominent in the abolitionist movement, including Morris Hallowell of Philadelphia and Francis Shaw of Boston.

To command the unit, Andrew already had Shaw's son in mind. Andrew wrote to Francis Shaw about the need to find a leader who would accept the responsibility of the command "with a full sense of its importance, with an earnest determination for its success." Included in Andrew's letter was a commission for Robert Shaw to take command of the new regiment.

Carrying the commission, Francis Shaw traveled to Virginia to speak with his son. Robert Shaw was hesitant to take the post, as he did not believe that authorities would send the unit to the front lines, and he did not want to leave his fellow soldiers. Finally he agreed to take the command. On February 6 he telegraphed his father with his decision. He was 25 years old. The command came with a colonelcy, the rank commensurate with the position of regimental commander.

Andrew had some difficulty finding enough African American volunteers in Massachusetts to form the regiment. Andrew assured recruits that they would receive the standard pay of 13 dollars a month, and that if they were captured, the government of the United States would insist they be treated as any other soldier. The Boston area provided enough recruits to form the regiment's "C" Company. The remainder of the regiment was formed with black recruits from all across the North. Few were former slaves from the South. Two sons of the prominent African-American abolitionist leader Frederick Douglass volunteered to serve with the 54th.

Captain Shaw arrived in Boston on February 15, 1863, and immediately assumed his position. He was a strict disciplinarian, determined to train the men to high standards. On March 25, 1863, Shaw wrote to his father of his fledgling regiment:

Everything goes on prosperously. The intelligence of the men is a great surprise to me. They learn all the details of guard duty and camp service infinitely more readily than most of the Irish that I have had under my command. There is not the least doubt that we will leave the State with as good a regiment as any that has marched.

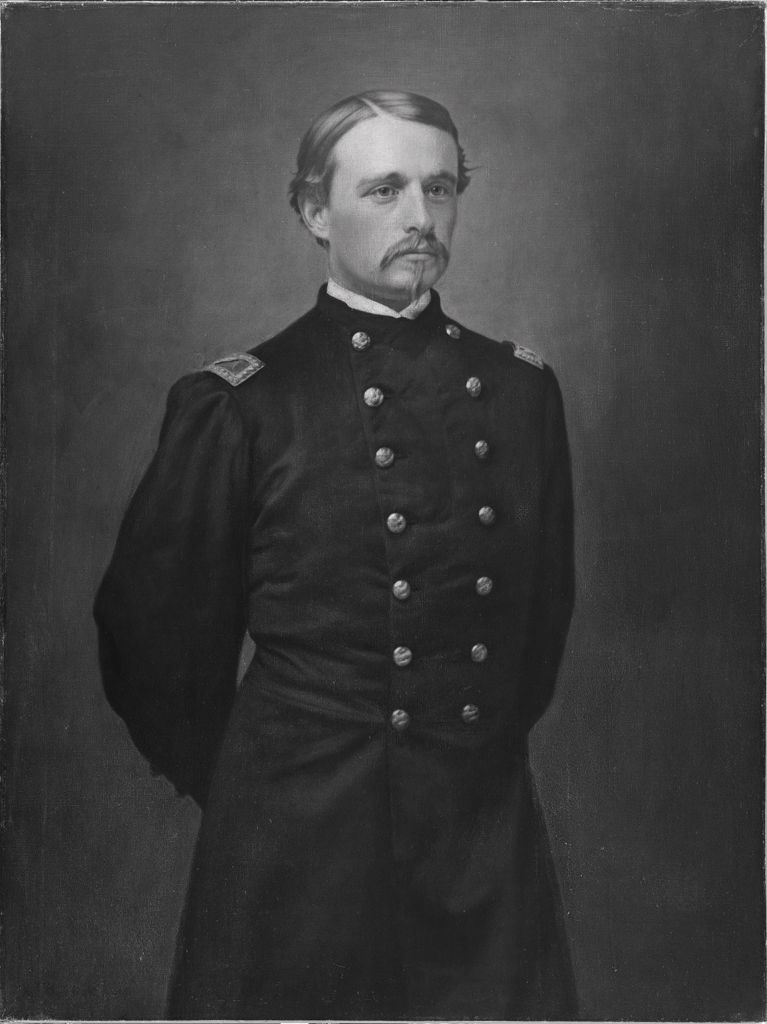
Col. Robert Gould Shaw by Horace R. Burdick

Shaw was promoted to major on March 31, 1863, and two weeks later on April 17 was made full colonel. On April 30 the regiment drew 950 Enfield rifled muskets and swords for non-commissioned officers (NCOs). By May 11 more troops had arrived in Boston than were required to man the regiment. The 55th Massachusetts was begun with the next round of new recruits.

On May 28 Shaw led the men of the 54th through the streets of Boston to the docks, where the regiment boarded a transport steamer and sailed south. The regiment was to be used in a Union campaign against Charleston, South Carolina, a major port. The 54th arrived at Port Royal Island on June 4, and was placed under the overall command of Major General David Hunter. Initially the regiment was used to provide manual labor at the loading docks, but Colonel Shaw applied for action. Four days later his regiment boarded onto transport and was sent to Hilton Head, South Carolina. From there they moved further south to St. Simons Island, Georgia, which served as their base of operations.

On June 11, 1863, the 54th was sent with the 2nd South Carolina Volunteers (who were also of African-American descent) for a raid against the town of Darien, Georgia. Overall command of the force was with the senior officer, Colonel James Montgomery of the 2nd South Carolina. Upon reaching the town, Montgomery set his troops to looting it. Shaw was outraged by this behavior by Union troops.

He ordered his troops to limit their seizures to those items that would be useful for the camp, and committed only one company to the task. After the town had been emptied of all valuables and livestock, Montgomery told Shaw, "I shall burn this town." To Shaw the burning of the town appeared to serve no military purpose, and he knew it would create a great hardship to its residents. In a letter to his family he recalled, "I told him I did not want to take the responsibility of it, and he was only too happy to take all of it on his own shoulders." Montgomery had the town burned to the ground.

After the regiment's return to camp, Shaw wrote to X Corps Assistant Adjutant General Lieutenant-Colonel Charles G. Halpine, seeking clarification of what was required of him. He asked if Montgomery was acting under orders from General Hunter, stating in part "I am perfectly willing to burn any place which resists, or gives some reason for such a proceeding; but it seems to me barbarous to turn women and children adrift in that way; and if I am only assisting Colonel Montgomery in a private enterprise of his own, it is very distasteful to me." It is not clear if Shaw ever received an answer from Halpine, but Montgomery was in fact carrying out a policy supported by Hunter.

=== Second Battle of Fort Wagner ===
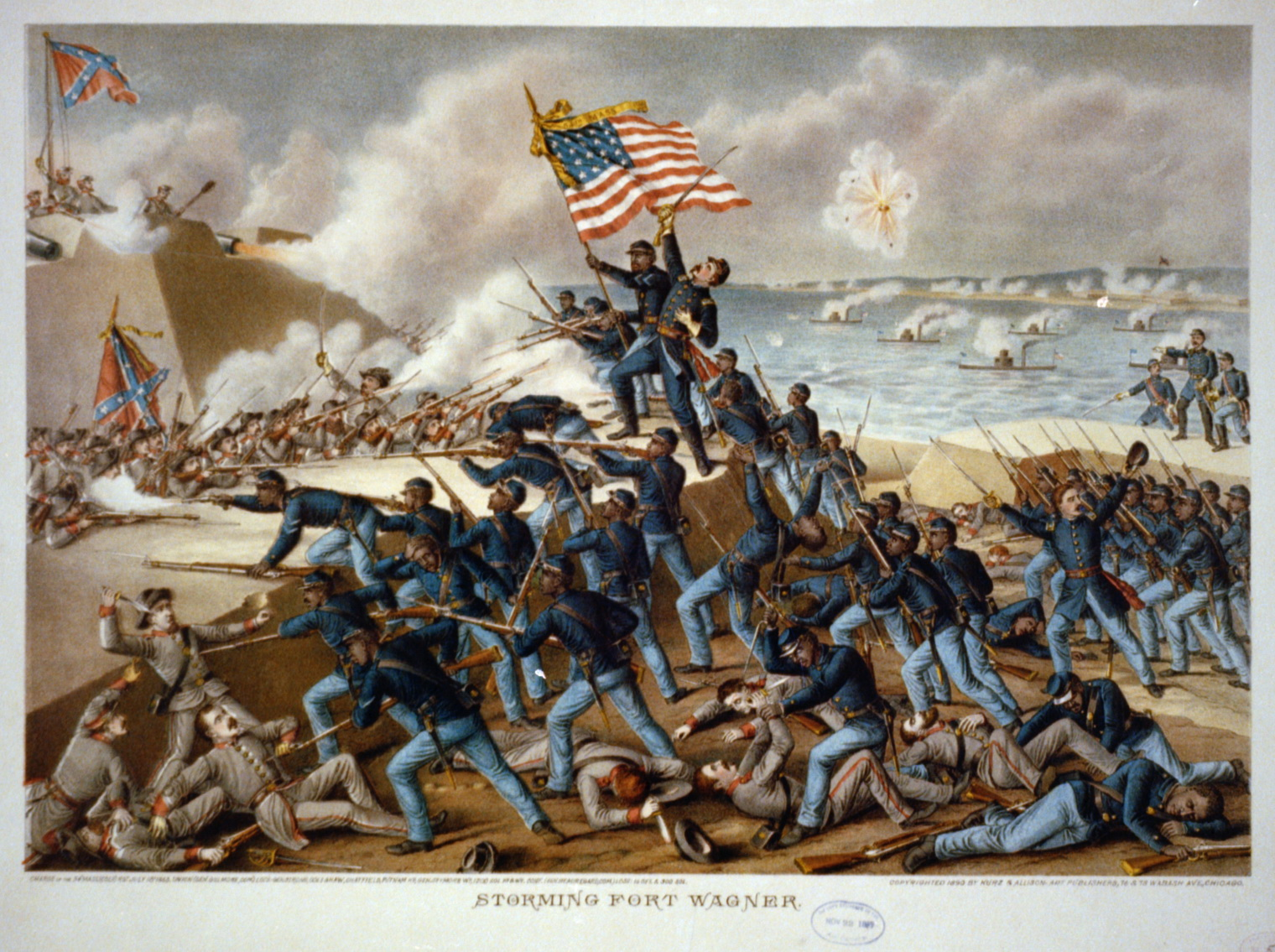
The Storming of Fort Wagner

Colonel Shaw and the 54th Regiment were placed under the command of General Quincy Adams Gillmore and sent to Charleston, South Carolina to take part in the second attempt to take Charleston. To do so, they would have to capture Fort Wagner, which defended the southern approach to the harbor. A significant Confederate garrison had been stationed there. The fort was well armed with an assortment of heavy guns. The overall strength of the defenders was underestimated by the Union command. The Union effort was supported by two other brigades, but the approach was narrow and only one regiment could attack at a time. At the battle on July 18, 1863, the 54th approached the fort in the late afternoon and then waited out of range for a night assault. After a heavy bombardment from the sea the 54th charged forward to take the Confederate batteries. Shaw led his men into battle, shouting "Forward freed men and fight for your country!" The 54th crossed the moat and scaled the muddy hill of the outer wall. With the cessation of the naval bombardment the largely intact Confederate garrison left their bomb-proofs and resumed their positions on the walls. In the face of heavy fire the 54th hesitated. Shaw mounted a parapet and urged his men forward, but was shot through the chest three times. By witness testimony of the unit's Color Sergeant, his death occurred early in the battle, and he fell on the outside of the fort. Some Confederate reports claim his body was hit as many as seven times. The fighting continued until 10 p.m. when the Union forces withdrew, having suffered heavy losses. Among the fatalities were Gen. George Crockett Strong, mortally wounded; Col. Haldimand S. Putnam shot and killed instantly; and Col. John Lyman Chatfield, mortally wounded. Shaw's 54th Regiment suffered the heaviest losses.

Two sons of Frederick Douglass, Lewis and Charles Douglass, were with the 54th regiment at the time of the attack. Lewis was wounded shortly after Shaw fell, and retreated with the rest when the force withdrew. Another casualty was Captain Garth Wilkinson James, younger brother of philosopher William James and novelist Henry James. "Wilkie" had volunteered to serve in the 54th and was wounded in the assault on Fort Wagner.

Following the battle, commanding Confederate General Johnson Hagood returned the bodies of the other Union officers who had died, but left Shaw's where it was, for burial in a mass grave with the black soldiers. Hagood told a captured Union surgeon that "Had he [Shaw] been in command of white troops ..." he would have returned Shaw's body, as was customary for officers, instead of burying it with the fallen black soldiers.

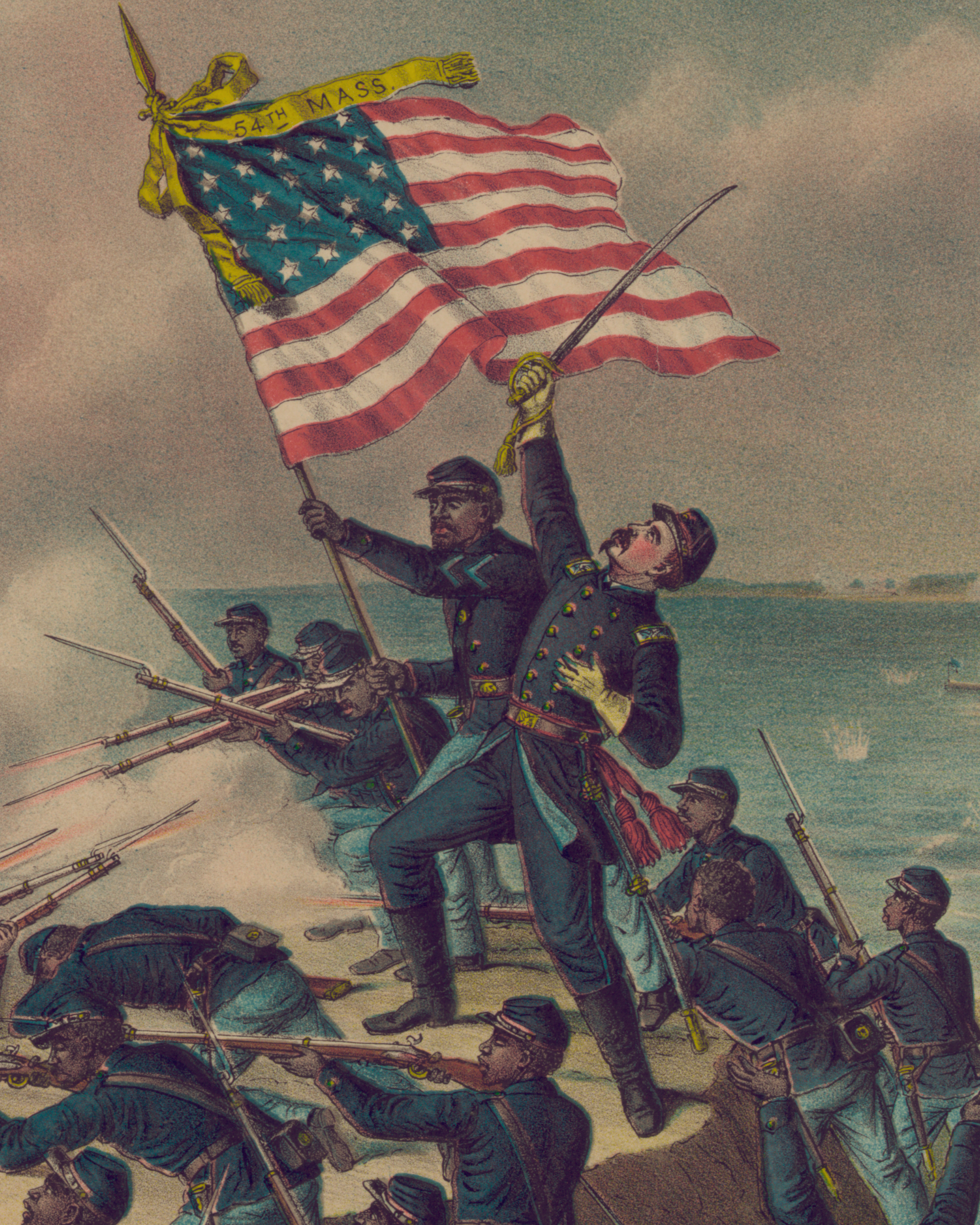
Shaw mortally wounded on July 18, 1863, with his troops.

Although the gesture was intended as an insult by Hagood, Shaw's friends and family believed it was an honor for him to be buried with his soldiers. Efforts had been made to recover Shaw's body (which had been stripped and robbed prior to burial). His father publicly proclaimed that he was proud to know that his son had been buried with his troops, befitting his role as a soldier and a crusader for emancipation.

In a letter to the regimental surgeon, Lincoln Stone, Frank Shaw wrote:

We would not have his body removed from where it lies surrounded by his brave and devoted soldiers. ... We can imagine no holier place than that in which he lies, among his brave and devoted followers, nor wish for him better company. – what a body-guard he has!

After the war, the Union Army disinterred and reburied all the remains—including, presumably, those of Col. Shaw—at the Beaufort National Cemetery in Beaufort, South Carolina. Their gravestones were marked as "unknown".

Shaw's sword had been stolen from the first gravesite but was recovered in 1865 from a house in Virginia and returned to his parents. It disappeared after being passed down within the family. In June 2017, it was discovered in a family attic of Mary Minturn Wood and brother Robert Bowne Minturn, descendants of Shaw's sister Susanna. They donated it to the Massachusetts Historical Society. (See § Legacy and honors.) His silk sash was also recovered and returned to his family many years later.

== Personal life ==
Shaw met Annie Kneeland Haggerty in New York at an opera party given in 1861 by his sister Susanna before the war began. The two became engaged just after Christmas in 1862. Despite misgivings by both sets of parents because of the war, they were married May 2, 1863, less than a month before Shaw's regiment moved out. The ceremony was in New York City. The pair spent a brief honeymoon at the Haggertys' home of Vent Fort, in Lenox, Massachusetts.

Two and a half years older than Shaw, "Annie" Shaw was widowed at the age of 28. She spent many years after the war living abroad in Europe, returning in later years when her health failed. The Haggerty property had been sold to George and Sarah Morgan, who built a large mansion there. They also kept the Haggerty home and allowed Anna to live there when she returned from Europe. She spent the last two years of her life living at her former family house and died in 1907, never having remarried. She is buried at the cemetery of Church-on-the Hill in Lenox.

== Memorials ==
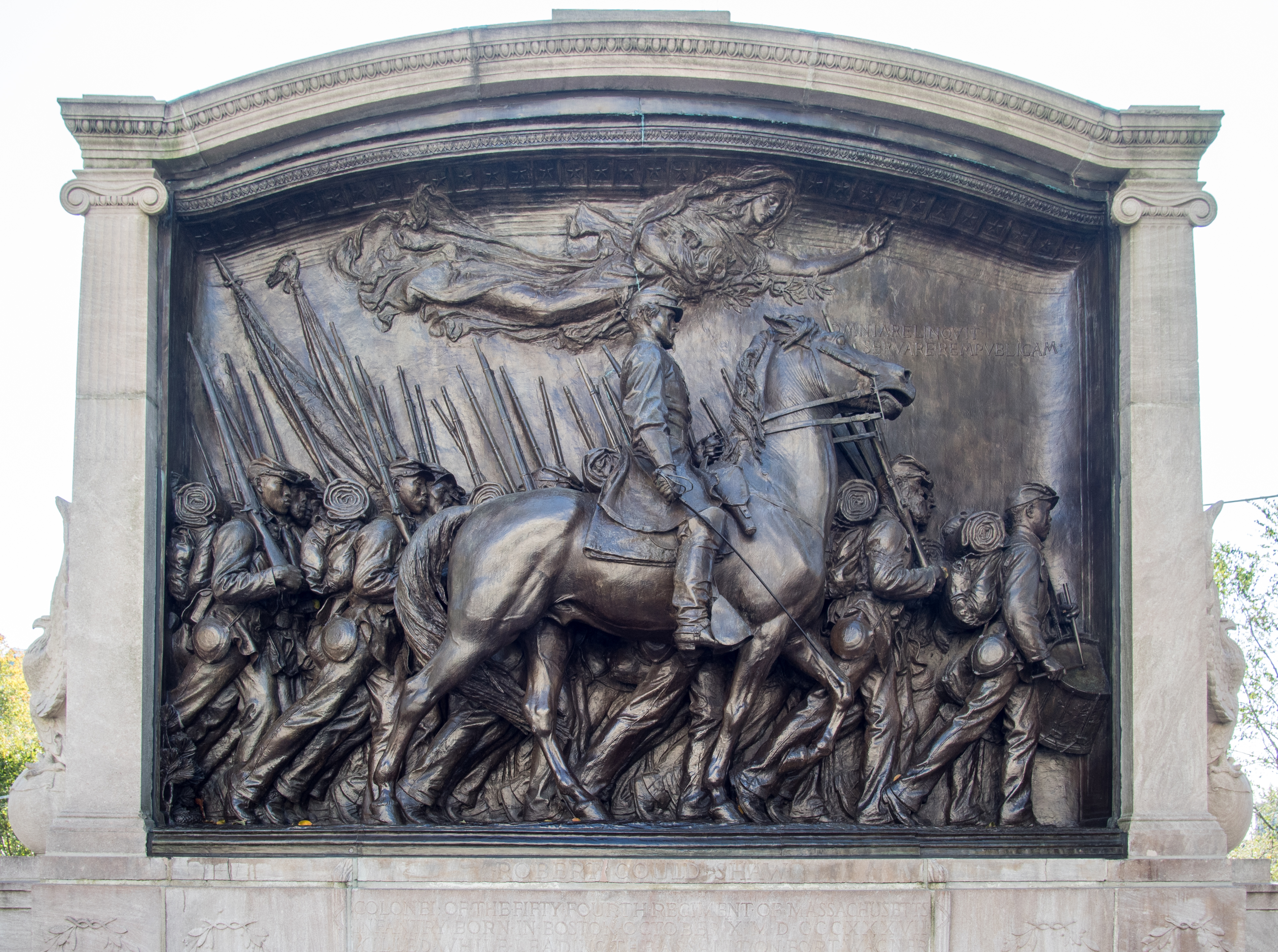
Bronze memorial to Shaw and the 54th regiment, by sculptor Augustus Saint-Gaudens, Boston Common (dedicated 1897)

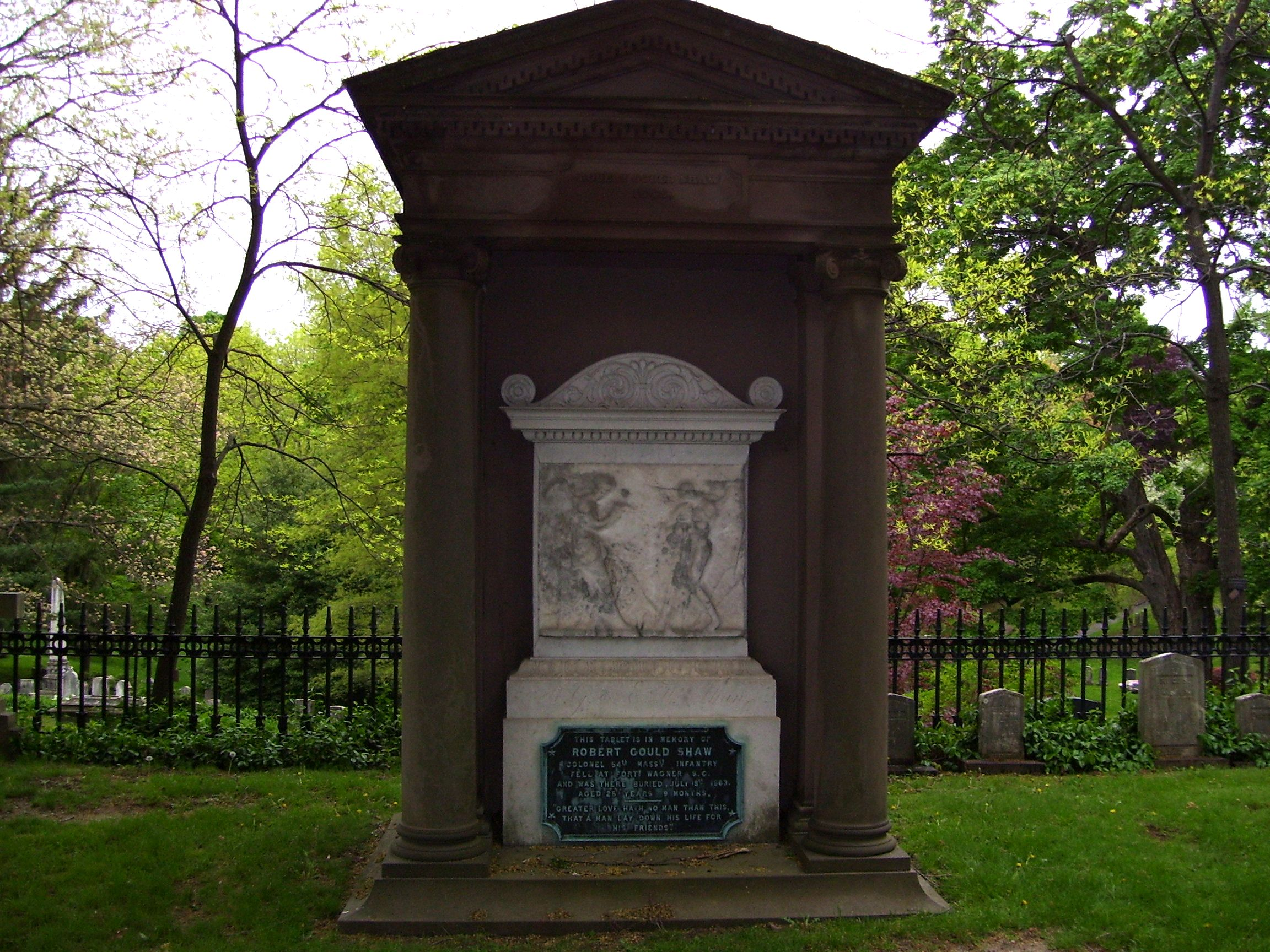
Shaw memorial at Mount Auburn Cemetery, Cambridge, Massachusetts

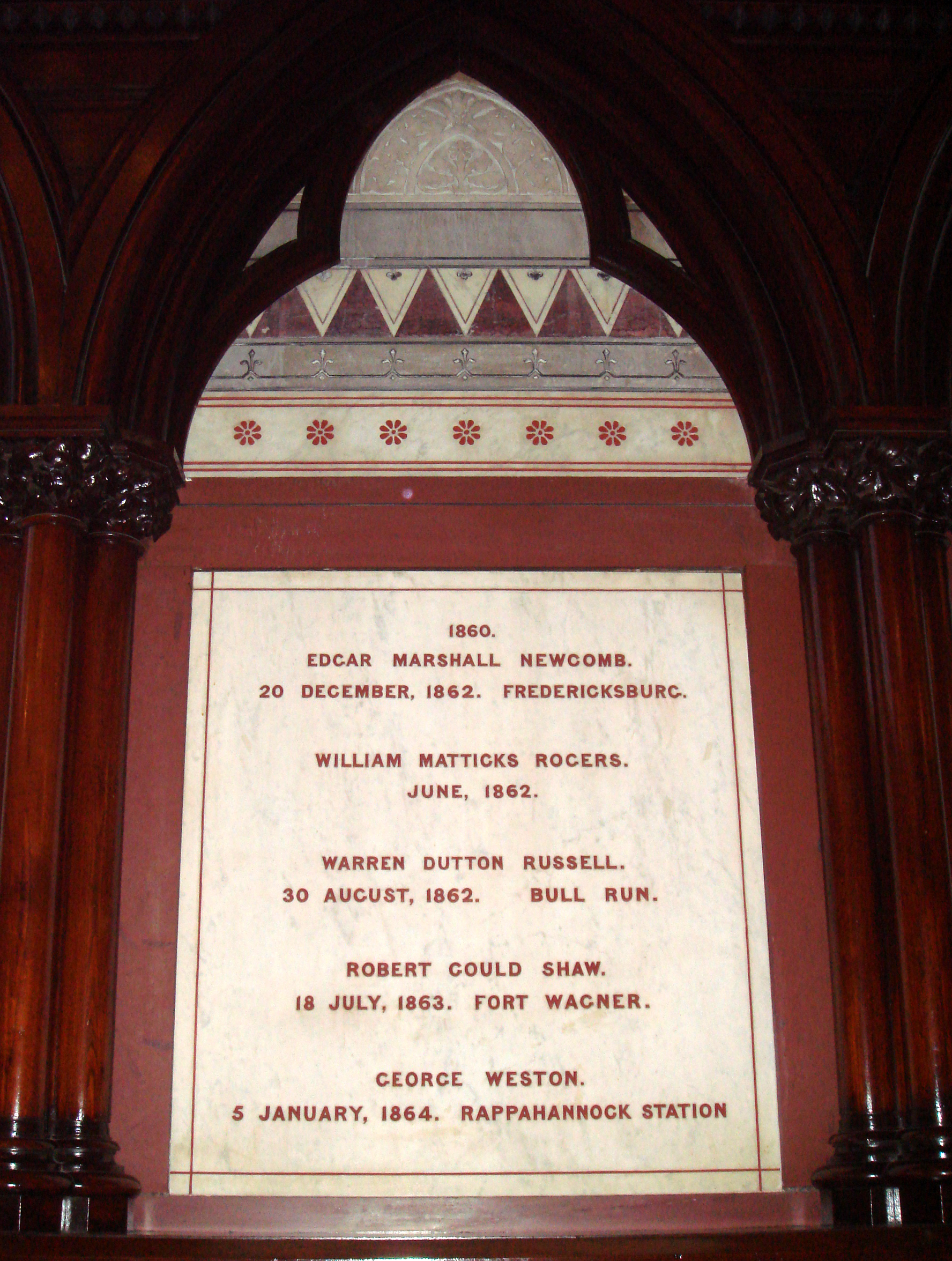
Entry for Shaw in Harvard University's Memorial Hall

- A cenotaph at the Mount Auburn Cemetery
- In 1864, American sculptor Edmonia Lewis created a bust of Shaw.
- The Robert Gould Shaw Memorial was unveiled on May 31, 1897, at its site on the Boston Common. The large sculptural monument by Augustus Saint-Gaudens has a frieze of Shaw on horseback accompanied by members of the 54th Regiment as they marched through Boston to depart for the war. It was featured in the ending credits of the film Glory (1989).

There they march, warm-blooded champions of a better day for man. There on horseback among them, in his very habit as he lived, sits the blue-eyed child of fortune, upon whose happy youth every divinity had smiled.

— Oration by William James at the exercises in the Boston Music Hall, May 31, 1897, upon the unveiling of the Shaw Monument.

- A patinated plaster cast of a slightly different design for the Shaw Memorial is now on display at the National Gallery of Art in Washington, D.C., which also holds some drawings and plaster mock-ups of the sculpture.
- A monument to Shaw's memory was erected by his family in the plot at Moravian Cemetery in Staten Island, New York. An annual commemoration is held there on his birthday.
- Although Shaw did not graduate from Harvard College, his name is listed on the tablets of honor in the university's Memorial Transept.
- Fordham University likewise celebrates Shaw as an alumnus by honoring him in the University Hall of Honor and separately in the Fordham University Military Hall of Fame.

The Robert Gould Shaw School, West Roxbury, Massachusetts, a Boston Public School, opened in 1936 but is now closed.

== Legacy and honors ==
- Augustus Saint-Gaudens was commissioned to create the Robert Gould Shaw Memorial, erected on the Boston Common in May 1897. He created a large sculptural frieze of Shaw leading the troops of the 54th Massachusetts Regiment, with the individuality of each man's face and figure expressed.
- The neighborhood of Shaw, Washington, D.C., which developed from encampments of freedmen, was named for him.
- G.A.R. Post #146, established on December 4, 1871, was named The R. G. Shaw Post in New Bedford, Massachusetts. It was one of the first all African-American Grand Army of the Republic posts, made up of comrades from the 54th Massachusetts. The Shaw Post dissolved in 1881.
- In 2017, the sword that Shaw was carrying at his death was discovered in the attic of a family home in Hamilton, Massachusetts. The owners, siblings Robert Shaw Wood and Mary Minturn Wood, donated it to the Massachusetts Historical Society. It went on public display on July 18 that year, the anniversary of Shaw's death.
- Shaw wrote more than 200 letters to his family and friends during the Civil War. These are held in the Houghton Library at Harvard University. Digital facsimiles of this collection are publicly available. His mother edited an early selection of his letters, and worked to preserve a positive image of him as a martyr to the abolitionist cause.

The first scholarly collection of the letters, Blue-Eyed Child of Fortune: The Civil War Letters of Colonel Robert Gould Shaw (1992), was edited by Russell Duncan. The book includes most of Shaw's letters and Duncan's brief biography of the officer, described as the best of those then current about him. Reid Mitchell notes Duncan "returns the historic Shaw" to readers, complete with his bias against the Irish and African Americans, both typical of his time. He wrote more frequently about his fellow officers than either the white or black soldiers who served with him, but expressed pride in the 54th.

- There is an ongoing effort to recognize Shaw's valorous actions at Fort Wagner with the Medal of Honor, which was not awarded at the time due to racial discrimination. The Fordham University Department of Military Science is actively supporting this venture.

== Gallery ==
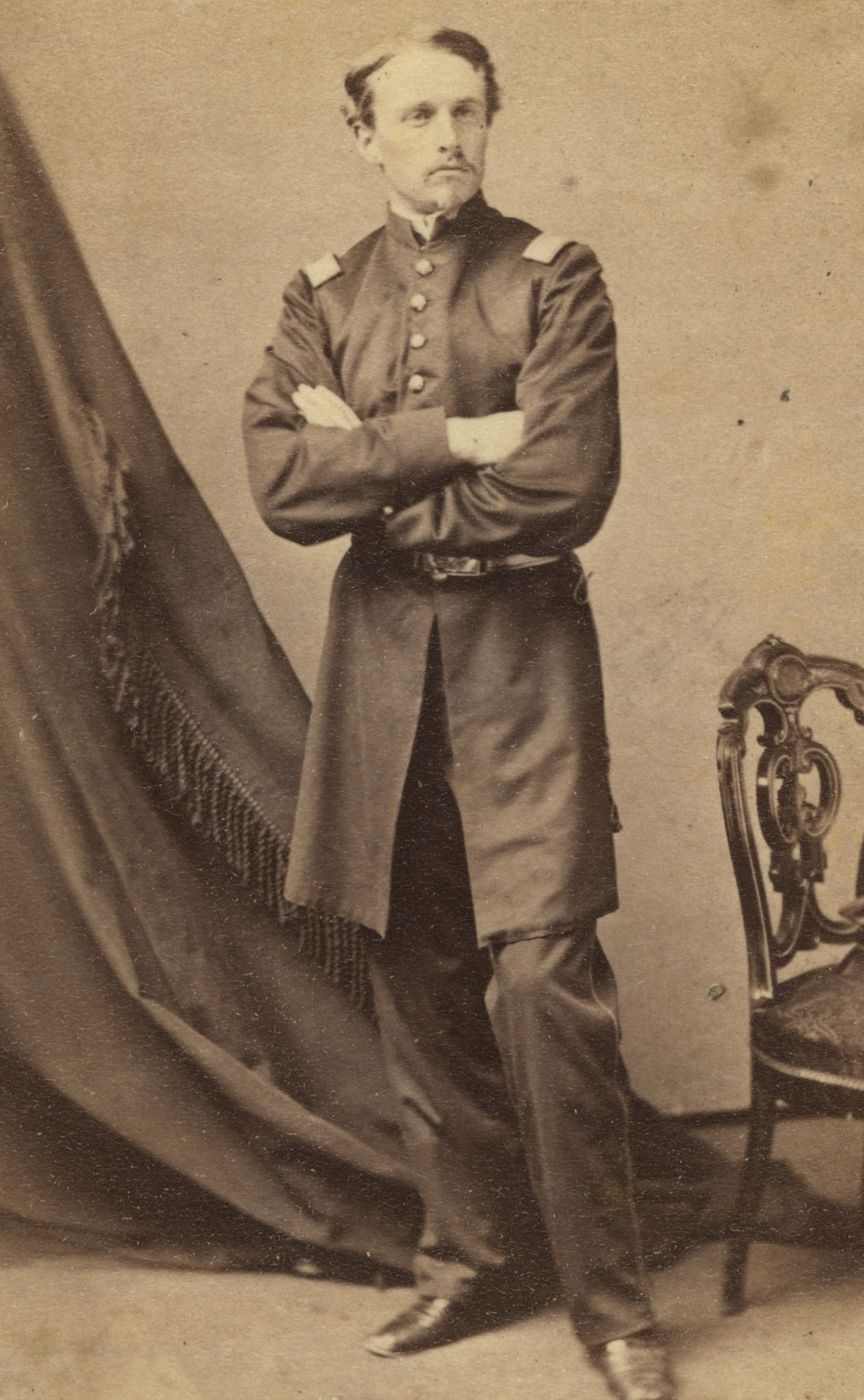
Shaw in 1861

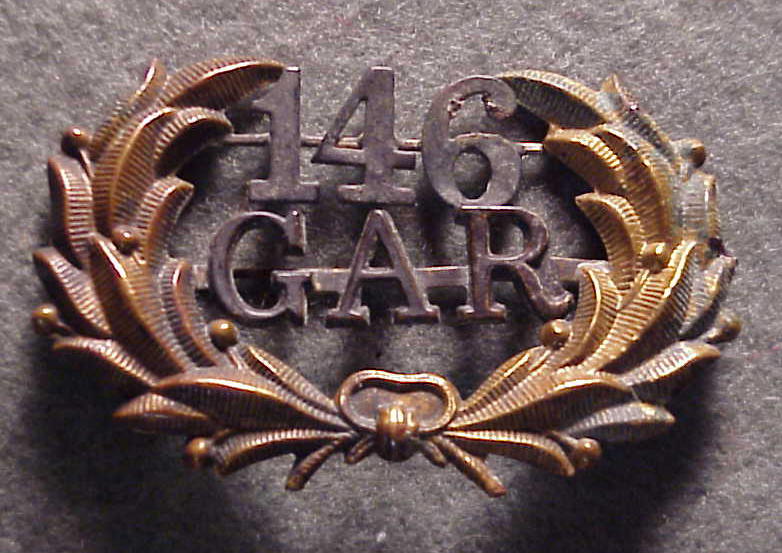
Original Grand Army of the Republic Uniform Hat Badge from Post No 146, aka 'RG Shaw Post', established by surviving members of the 54th Massachusetts Regiment in 1871. In the R Andre Stevens Civil War Collection.

== In popular culture ==
New Deal-era artwork by Carlos Lopez at the Recorder of Deeds building in Washington, D.C.: "The 54th Massachusetts regiment, under the leadership of Colonel Shaw in the attack on Fort Wagner, Morris Island, South Carolina, in 1863"

- African-American poet Paul Laurence Dunbar's poem, "Robert Gould Shaw," includes the lines: "Since thou and those who with thee died for right/Have died, the Present teaches, but in vain!"
- African-American poet Benjamin Griffith Brawley wrote a memorial poem entitled "My Hero" in praise of Shaw.
- Shaw, the 54th regiment, and Augustus Saint-Gaudens' memorial are one of the subjects of Charles Ives's composition for orchestra, Three Places in New England.
- New England poet Robert Lowell referred to both Shaw and the Shaw Memorial in the poem "For the Union Dead", which Lowell published in his 1964 collection of the same name.
- The film Glory (1989), directed by Edward Zwick, is about Shaw and the 54th Massachusetts Infantry Regiment, and their battles. Written by Kevin Jarre, it stars Matthew Broderick as Shaw, and Denzel Washington, Cary Elwes, and Morgan Freeman as soldiers of the regiment.
- Colm Toibin's novel The Master (2004), principally about writer Henry James, recounts the participation of his younger brother Wilkie James as an officer in the 54th Regiment.
- Shaw appeared in the third season of American historical documentary series Legends & Lies. He is portrayed by Andrew James Bleidner.

== See also ==
- Ventfort Hall
- Bibliography of the American Civil War
