= Josephine Shaw Lowell =

Progressive reform leader and philanthropist (1843–1905)

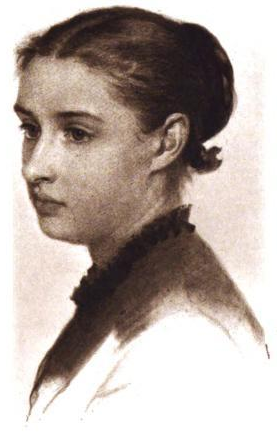
- Portrait, 1869
- Born: Josephine Shaw; December 16, 1843; Roxbury, Massachusetts
- Died: October 12, 1905 (aged 61); New York City
- Spouse: Charles Russell Lowell
- Children: Carlotta Russell Lowell

Signature
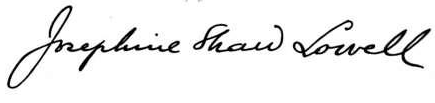

Josephine Shaw Lowell (December 16, 1843 – October 12, 1905) was an American Progressive advocate who founded the New York Consumers League in 1890. Seth Low's biographer described her as the "grand dame of the social reformers".

== Early life ==
Josephine Shaw was born in the West Roxbury section of Roxbury, Massachusetts into a wealthy New England family in 1843. Her parents, Francis George and Sarah Blake (Sturgis) Shaw, were Unitarian philanthropists and intellectuals who encouraged their five children to study, learn and become involved in their communities. They lived for some years in France and Italy and then settled on Staten Island while Josephine (known as "Effie") was a child. Her brother was the Civil War officer Robert Gould Shaw.

== Career ==
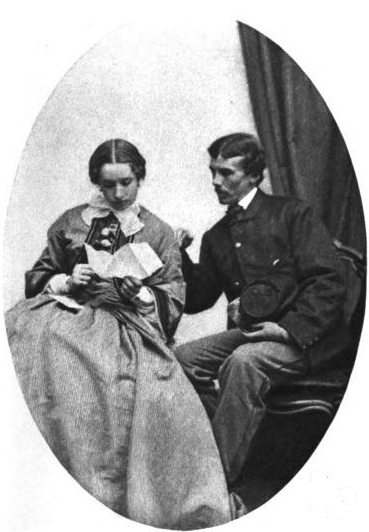
Josephine Shaw and Colonel Lowell in 1863

Josephine Shaw married Charles Russell Lowell, a businessman, in 1863. She followed him to Virginia when he was called into service during the Civil War. Lowell helped wounded men on the battlefield. She also prepared and send parcels through United States Sanitary Commission to soldiers on the front. Charles died in battle, less than a year after they were married and only one month before their daughter, Carlotta, was born.

During her travels, Lowell made the acquaintance of Thomas Carlyle, who sympathised with the Confederacy. Feeling that he underestimated the quality and patriotism of Union soldiers, she sent him biographical sketches of her husband and brother. He wrote to her on 10 March 1870 in acknowledgment of them, saying that it would be hard "not to recognize the high and noble spirit that dwelt in those young men".

=== Progressive leader ===
A young widow, Lowell moved back to Staten Island with Carlotta, and lived with her parents. After her father's death, she lived with her mother and daughter in New York City. She became a businesswoman and a reformer. Lowell was active in the Anti-Imperialist League where she met other prominent Progressives. She served as Vice-President of the League from 1901–1905 and was a great advocate of Philippine independence.

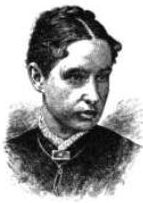
Josephine Shaw Lowell

Lowell was committed to social justice and reform and seized the opportunity to become involved in Progressive reform and the eradication of poverty. She once said, "If the working people had all they ought to have, we should not have the paupers and criminals. It is better to save them before they go under, than to spend your life fishing them out afterward."

However, Lowell viewed the very poor as "worthless men and women" who were "vicious and idle" individuals that needed to "learn to enjoy work". She proposed imprisoning "all women under thirty who had been arrested for misdemeanors or who had produced two illegitimate children". She blamed New Yorkers who gave to the poor for the death of a baby who was living on the streets with her poor mother during a cold winter. She believed that the very poor should be "committed, until reformed, to district work-houses, there to be kept at hard-labor, and educated morally and mentally".

In 1876, Governor Samuel Tilden of New York State appointed Lowell to Commissioner of the New York State Board of Charities. She was the first woman to ever hold this position. She served actively on the Board until 1889. During her tenure, Lowell grew to be one of New York's renowned Protestant charity reformers. A prominent issue she openly criticized was the impact and costs of a 1875 religion matching law that created a disproportionate share of dependent children between Catholic and non-Catholic orphanages in the late 1890s.

Lowell and the State Board of Charities established the New York State Custodial Asylum for Feeble-Minded Women in 1878. The asylum was a response to public concerns that "feeble-minded" women needed to be housed in a specialized facility. In several reports before the state legislature, Lowell stated that feeble-minded women disregarded moral and sexual restraint when placed in the undisciplined environment of an almshouse and frequently had illegitimate children who, in turn, became dependent on the state for their welfare. Women of child-bearing age, fifteen to forty-five, were admitted into this institution, in order to "prevent them from multiplying their kind" (New York State Board of Charities Report, 1879). Lowell described these women as "promiscuous and criminalistic" carriers of a "deadly poison" which reproduced through successive generations, and charities must not allow "men and women who are diseased and vicious to reproduce their kind".

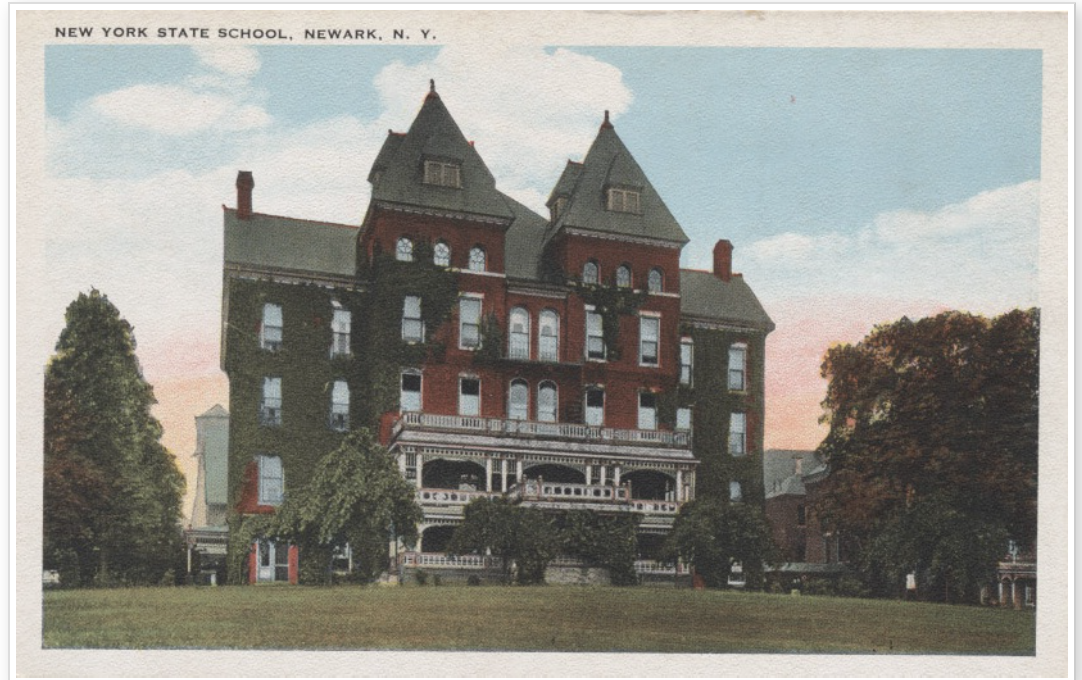
Established in Newark, NY, by Josephine Shaw Lowell and the State Board of Charities (1878)

Throughout her lifetime, she also founded many charitable organizations including: the New York Charity Organization in 1882 where she worked with Jacob Riis, the House of Refuge for Women (later known as the New York Training School for Girls) in 1886, the Woman's Municipal League in 1894, and the Civil Service Reform Association of New York State in 1895.

=== New York Consumers' League ===
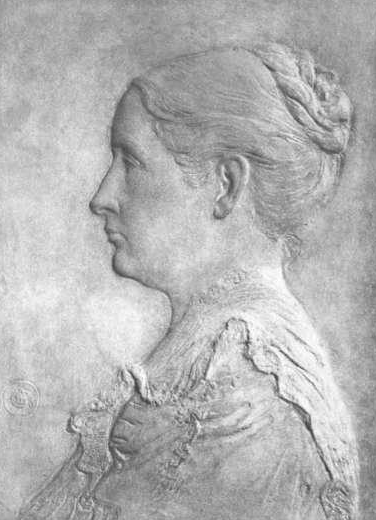
Josephine Shaw Lowell in 1899 (from a Bas-Relief by Augustus Saint-Gaudens)

Perhaps her most wide-ranging and effective organization was the New York Consumers' League which she established in 1890. This organization strove to improve the wages and the working conditions of women workers in New York City. The League was particularly concerned with retail clerks. Lowell published a "White List" that contained a list of stores known to treat women workers well. Initially, the list was very short.

The New York Consumer's League was adopted in many other cities as chapters opened across the country. The umbrella organization, the National Consumers League (NCL), became a powerful lobbying group.

== Death ==
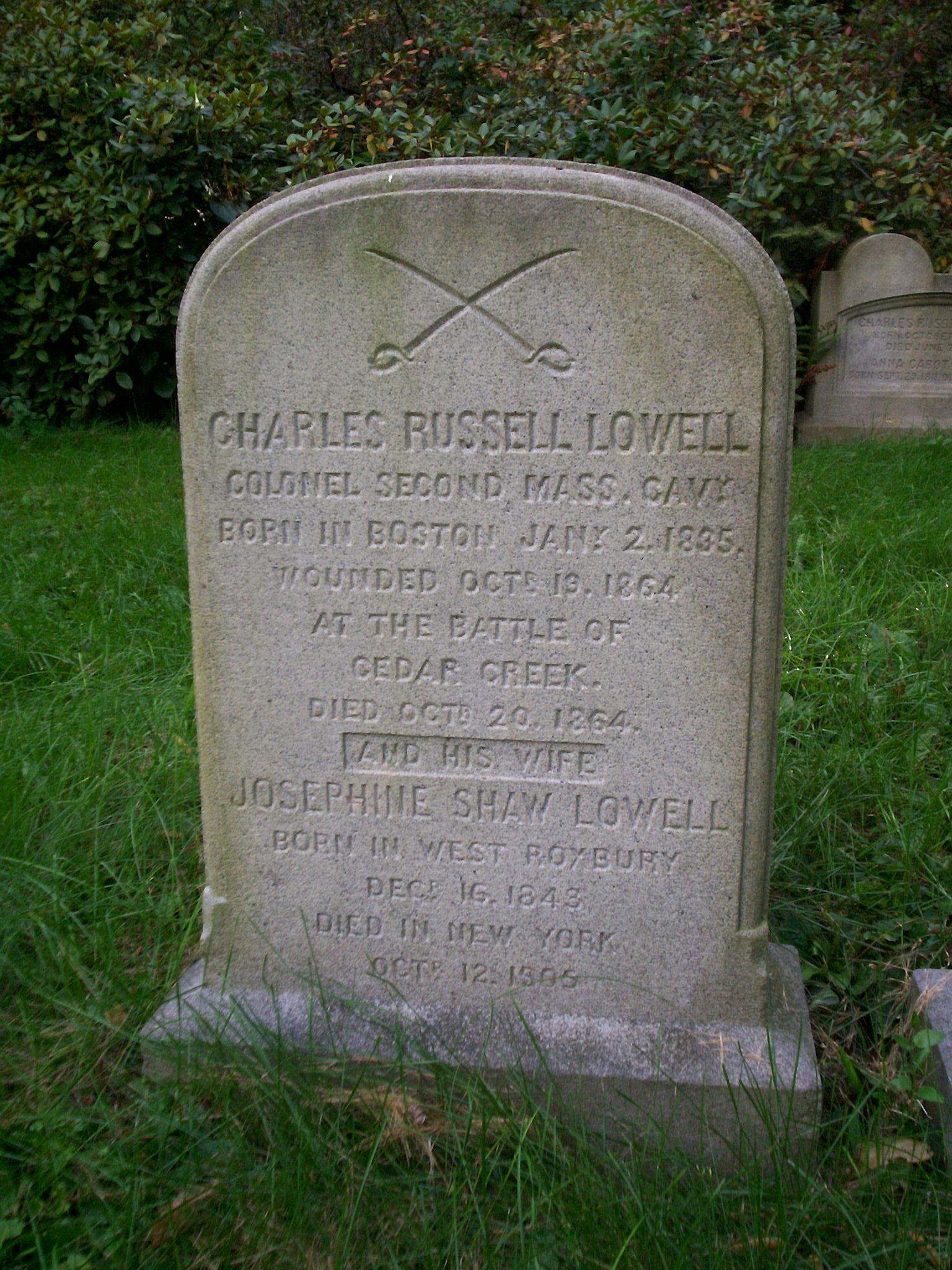
Grave of Josephine Shaw Lowell and her husband Charles Russell Lowell at Mount Auburn Cemetery

She died of cancer in 1905, at her home in New York City, and is buried with her husband at Mount Auburn Cemetery in Cambridge, Massachusetts. The Josephine Shaw Lowell Memorial Fountain in Bryant Park, which is behind the New York Public Library Main Branch building, was dedicated in 1912. The fountain is reportedly New York City's first public memorial dedicated to a woman.

== Publications ==
- Public Relief and Private Charity (1884).
- Industrial Arbitration and Conciliation (1893).
