= Robert Lowell =

American poet (1917–1977)

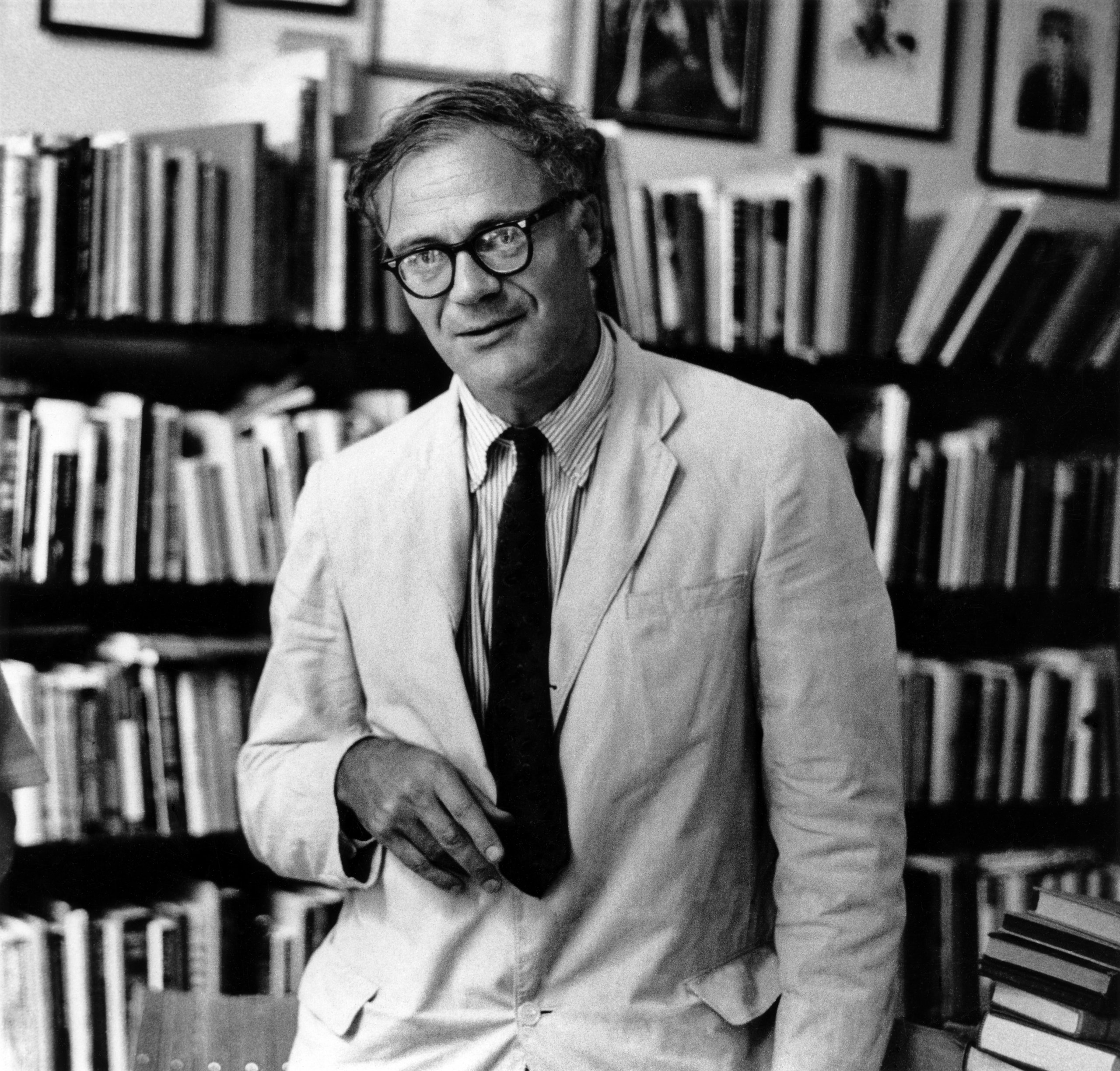
- At the Grolier Poetry Bookshop in Harvard Square, 1965
- Born: Robert Traill Spence Lowell IV; March 1, 1917; Boston, Massachusetts, U.S.
- Died: September 12, 1977 (aged 60); New York City, U.S.
- Resting place: Stark Cemetery; Dunbarton, New Hampshire, U.S.
- Education: Harvard University; Kenyon College (BA)
- Occupation: Poet
- Spouses: Jean Stafford (m. 1940; div. 1948) Elizabeth Hardwick (m. 1949; div. 1972) Caroline Blackwood (m. 1972)
- Children: 2
- Writing career
- Period: 1944–1977
- Genre: American poetry
- Notable works: Lord Weary's Castle; Life Studies; For the Union Dead; The Dolphin (1973)
- Movement: Confessional poetry

Robert Traill Spence Lowell IV (/ˈloʊəl/; March 1, 1917 – September 12, 1977) was an American poet. He was born into a Boston Brahmin family that could trace its origins back to the Mayflower. His ancestors and contemporary family were important subjects in his poetry. Growing up in Boston also informed his poems, which were frequently set in Boston and the New England region. Literary scholar Paula Hayes argues that, particularly in his early work, Lowell mythologized New England.

Lowell stated, "The poets who most directly influenced me ... were Allen Tate, Elizabeth Bishop, and William Carlos Williams. An unlikely combination! ... but you can see that Bishop is a sort of bridge between Tate's formalism and Williams's informal art." Lowell wrote in both formal, metered verse and free verse; his verse in some poems from Life Studies and Notebook falls somewhere in between metered and free verse.

After Life Studies (1959) was published, winning the 1960 National Book Award and featuring "a new emphasis on intense, uninhibited discussion of personal, family, and psychological struggles", he started to be considered an important part of the confessional poetry movement. However, much of Lowell's work, which often combined the public with the personal, did not conform to a typical "confessional poetry" model. Instead, Lowell worked in a number of distinctive stylistic modes and forms over the course of his career.

He was appointed the sixth Consultant in Poetry to the Library of Congress, where he served from 1947 until 1948. In addition to the National Book Award, he won the Pulitzer Prize for Poetry in 1947 and 1974, the National Book Critics Circle Award in 1977, and a National Institute of Arts and Letters Award in 1947. He is "widely considered one of the most important American poets of the postwar era." His biographer Paul Mariani called him "the poet-historian of our time" and "the last of [America's] influential public poets."

== Life ==
=== Family history ===
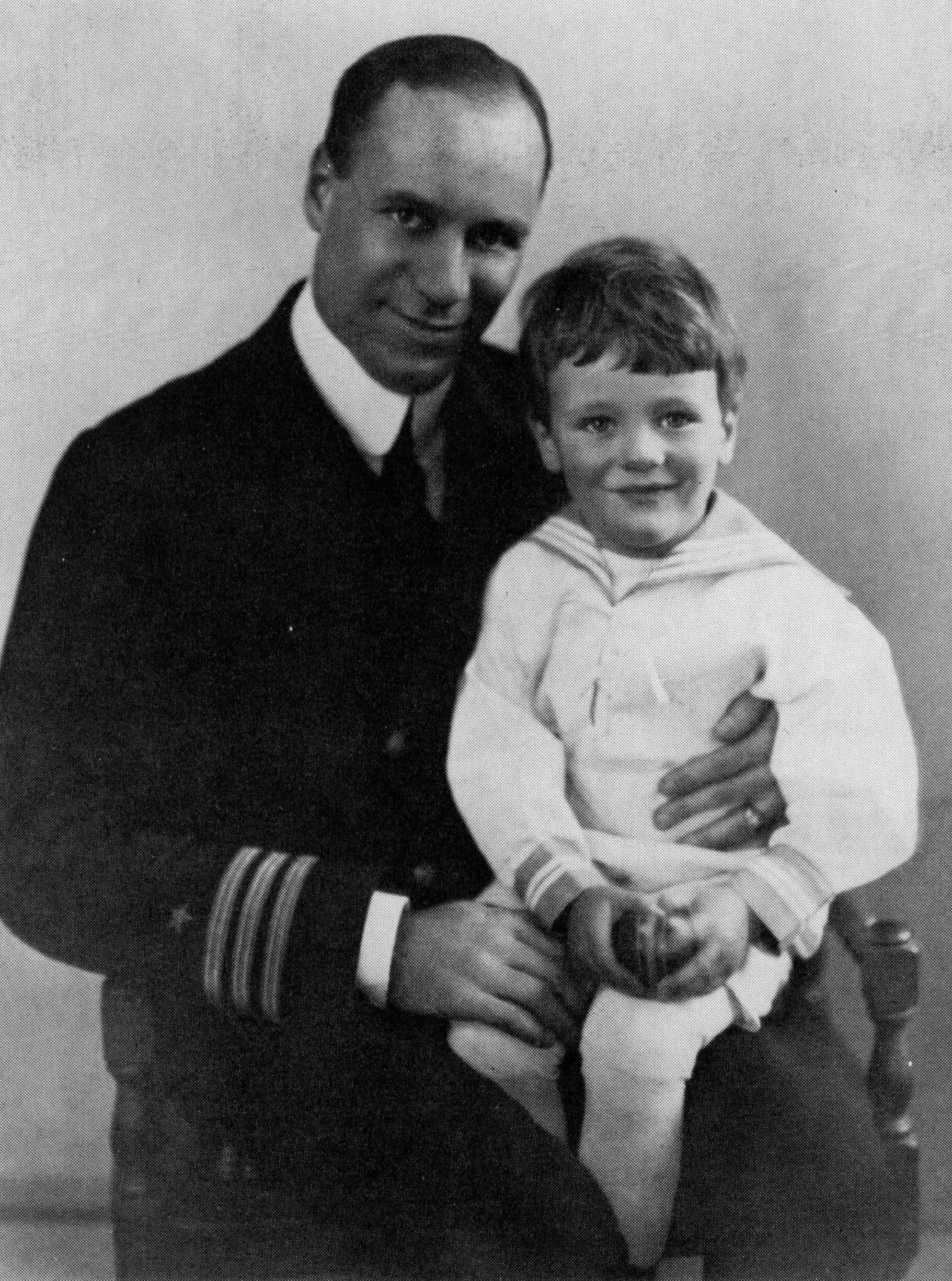
Lowell as a child with his father, Commander Robert Traill Spence Lowell III, around 1920

Lowell was born to United States Navy Cmdr. Robert Traill Spence Lowell III and Charlotte Winslow in Boston, Massachusetts. The Lowells were a Boston Brahmin family that included poets Amy Lowell and James Russell Lowell; clergymen Charles Russell Lowell Sr. and Robert Traill Spence Lowell; Civil War general and war hero Charles Russell Lowell III (about whom Lowell wrote his poem "Charles Russell Lowell: 1835-1864"); and the Federal Judge John Lowell.

His mother was a descendant of William Samuel Johnson, a signer of the United States Constitution; Jonathan Edwards, the Calvinist theologian (about whom Lowell wrote the poems "Mr. Edwards and the Spider", "Jonathan Edwards in Western Massachusetts", "After the Surprising Conversions", and "The Worst Sinner"); Anne Hutchinson, the Puritan preacher and healer; Robert Livingston (who was also an ancestor on Lowell's paternal side); Thomas Dudley, the second governor of Massachusetts; and Mayflower passengers James Chilton and his daughter Mary Chilton. Lowell's parents share a common descent from Philip Livingston, the son of Robert Livingston, and were sixth cousins.

As well as a family history steeped in Protestantism, Lowell had notable Jewish ancestors on both sides of his family, which he discusses in Part II ("91 Revere Street") of Life Studies. On his father's side, Lowell was the great-great-grandson of Maj. Mordecai Myers (father of Theodorus Bailey Myers, Lowell's great-granduncle), a soldier in the War of 1812 and later mayor of Kinderhook and Schenectady; and on his mother's side, he was descended from the German-Jewish Mordecai family of Raleigh, North Carolina, who were prominent in state affairs.

=== Early years ===
As a youth, Lowell had a penchant for violence and bullying other children.

Describing himself as an 8½-year-old in the prose piece "91 Revere Street", Lowell wrote that he was "thick-witted, narcissistic, thuggish." As a teenager, Lowell's peers gave him the nickname "Cal" after both the villainous Shakespeare character Caliban and the tyrannical Roman emperor Caligula, and the nickname stuck with him throughout his life. Lowell later referenced the nickname in his poem "Caligula", first published in his book For the Union Dead and later republished in a revised sonnet version for his book, Notebook 1967–1968.

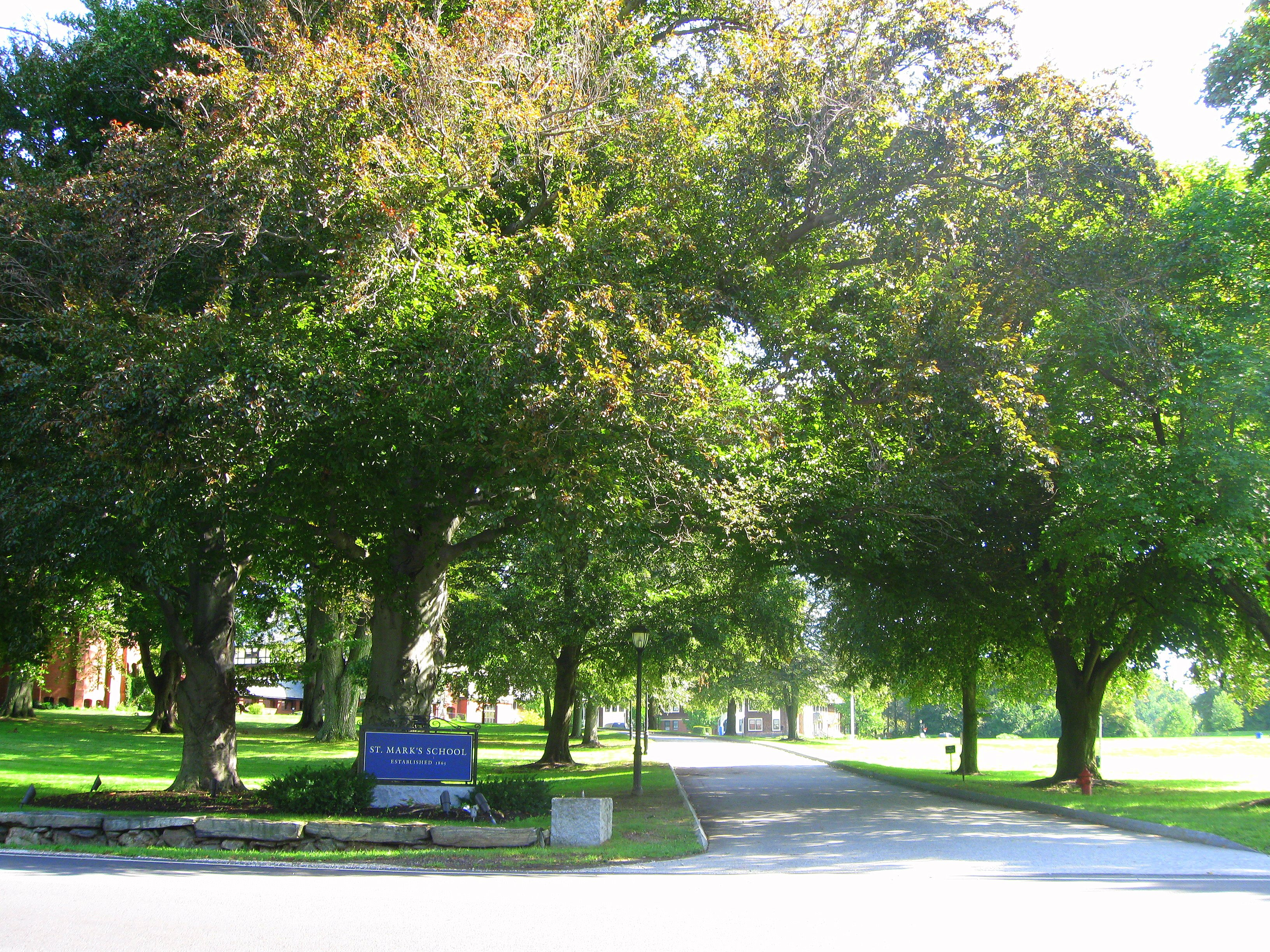
St. Mark's School, Southborough, Massachusetts

As a young child he attended the Brimmer School in Boston (later merged into the Brimmer and May School), which he later depicted in his memoir "91 Revere Street". Lowell later received his high school education at St. Mark's School, a prominent prep school in Southborough, Massachusetts. There he met and was influenced by the poet Richard Eberhart, who taught at the school, and as a high school student, Lowell decided that he wanted to become a poet. At St. Mark's, he became lifelong friends with Frank Parker, an artist who later created the prints that Lowell used on the covers of most of his books.

Lowell attended Harvard College for two years. While he was a freshman at Harvard, he visited Robert Frost in Cambridge and asked for feedback on a long poem he had written on the Crusades; Frost suggested that Lowell needed to work on his compression. In an interview, Lowell recalled, "I had a huge blank verse epic on the First Crusade and took it to him all in my undecipherable pencil-writing, and he read a little of it, and said, 'It goes on rather a bit, doesn't it?' And then he read me the opening of Keats's 'Hyperion', the first version, and I thought all of that was sublime."

After two years at Harvard, Lowell was unhappy, and his psychiatrist, Merrill Moore, who was also a poet, suggested that Lowell take a leave of absence from Harvard to get away from his parents and study with Moore's friend, the poet-professor Allen Tate who was then living in Nashville and teaching at Vanderbilt University.

Lowell traveled to Nashville with Moore, who took Lowell to Tate's house. Lowell asked Tate if he could live with him and his wife, and Tate joked that if Lowell wanted to, Lowell could pitch a tent on Tate's lawn; Lowell then went to Sears to purchase a tent that he set up on Tate's lawn and lived in for two months. Lowell called the act "a terrible piece of youthful callousness."

After spending time with the Tates in Nashville (and attending some classes taught by John Crowe Ransom at Vanderbilt), Lowell decided to leave Harvard. When Tate and John Crowe Ransom left Vanderbilt for Kenyon College in Ohio, Lowell followed them and resumed his studies there, majoring in classics, in which he earned an A.B., summa cum laude in 1940. He was elected to Phi Beta Kappa his junior year and was valedictorian of his class. He settled into the so-called "writer's house" (a dorm that received its nickname after it had accrued several ambitious young writers) with fellow students Peter Taylor, Robie Macauley and Randall Jarrell.

Partly in rebellion against his parents, Lowell converted from Episcopalianism to Catholicism, and was for a time an editor at the Catholic publishing house Sheed and Ward. He corresponded with literary critic, poet, and Catholic nun M. Bernetta Quinn. Upon graduating from Kenyon, he worked on a master's degree in English literature at Louisiana State University and taught introductory courses in English for one year before the U.S. entered World War II.

=== Political engagement ===
Lowell was a conscientious objector during World War II and served several months at the federal prison in Danbury, Connecticut. He explained his decision not to serve in World War II in a letter addressed to President Franklin Roosevelt on September 7, 1943, stating, "Dear Mr President: I very much regret that I must refuse the opportunity you offer me in your communication of August 6, 1943 for service in the Armed Force." He explained that after the bombing at Pearl Harbor, he was prepared to fight in the war until he read about the American terms of unconditional surrender that he feared would lead to the "permanent destruction of Germany and Japan." Before Lowell was transferred to the prison in Connecticut, he was held in a prison in New York City that he later wrote about in the poem "Memories of West Street and Lepke" in his book Life Studies, inspired by a prison encounter with notorious gangster Lepke Buchalter.

While at Yaddo in 1949 Lowell became involved in the Red Scare and accused the then director, Elizabeth Ames, of harboring communists and being romantically involved with another resident, Agnes Smedley. If Ames were not fired immediately, Lowell vowed to "blacken the name of Yaddo as widely as possible" using his connections in the literary sphere and Washington. Lowell, with the support of fellow artists in residence Flannery O'Connor, Elizabeth Hardwick (writer), and Edward Maisel, swayed the Yaddo's board to hold an emergency meeting interrogating Ames. The board ultimately voted a month after the meeting to drop all charges against Ames.

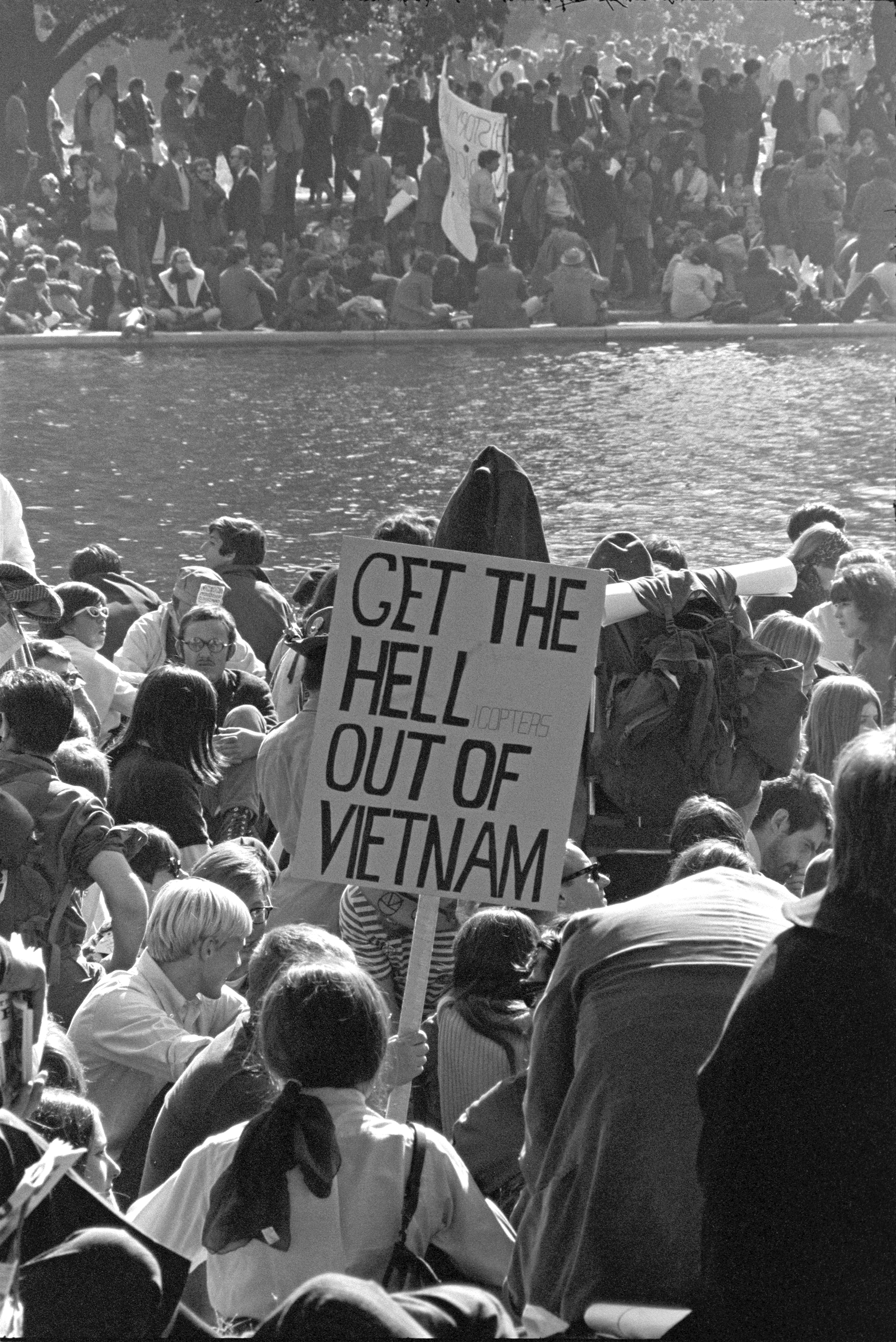
Vietnam War protestors at the March on the Pentagon, 1967

Lowell's letter to the president was his first major political act of protest, but it would not be his last. During the mid to late 1960s, Lowell actively opposed the Vietnam War.

In response to American air raids in Vietnam in 1965, Lowell rejected an invitation to the White House Festival of the Arts from President Lyndon Johnson in a letter that he subsequently published in The New York Times, stating, "We are in danger of imperceptibly becoming an explosive and suddenly chauvinistic nation, and may even be drifting on our way to the last nuclear ruin." Ian Hamilton notes that "throughout [1967], [Lowell] was in demand as a speaker and petition signer [against the war]. He was vehemently opposed to the war, but equivocal about being identified too closely with the 'peace movement': there were many views he did not share with the more fiery of the 'peaceniks' and it was not in his nature to join movements that he had no wish to lead." However, Lowell did participate in the October 1967 March on the Pentagon in Washington, D.C. against the war and was one of the featured speakers at the event. Norman Mailer, who was also a featured speaker at the rally, introduced Lowell to the crowd of protesters. Mailer described the peace march and his impression of Lowell that day in the early sections of his non-fiction novel The Armies of the Night. Lowell was also a signer of the anti-war manifesto "A Call to Resist Illegitimate Authority" circulated by members of the radical intellectual collective RESIST.

In 1968, Lowell publicly supported the Minnesota Senator Eugene McCarthy in his campaign for the Democratic nomination for president in a three-way primary against Robert F. Kennedy and Hubert Humphrey. Lowell spoke at numerous fundraisers for McCarthy in New York that year, but "[his] heart went out of the race" after Robert Kennedy's assassination.

=== Teaching ===
From 1950 to 1953, Lowell taught in the Iowa Writers' Workshop, together with Paul Engle and Robie Macauley. Later, Donald James Winslow hired Lowell to teach at Boston University, where his students included the poets Sylvia Plath, Anne Sexton, and George Starbuck. Over the years, he taught at a number of other universities including the University of Cincinnati, Yale University, Harvard University, and the New School for Social Research. Numerous poets, critics and scholars, including Kathleen Spivack, James Atlas, Helen Vendler, and Dudley Young, have written essays about Lowell's teaching style and/or about his influence over their lives.

In 2012, Spivack also published a book, With Robert Lowell and His Circle, about her experience studying with Lowell at Boston University in 1959. From 1963 to 1970, Lowell commuted from his home in New York City to Boston to teach classes at Harvard.

Scholar Helen Vendler attended one of Lowell's poetry courses and wrote that one of the best aspects of Lowell's informal style was that he talked about poets in class as though "the poets [being studied] were friends or acquaintances". Hamilton quoted students who stated that Lowell "taught 'almost by indirection', 'he turned every poet into a version of himself', [and] 'he told stories [about the poets' lives] as if they were the latest news.'"

=== Influences ===
In March 2005, the Academy of American Poets named Life Studies one of their Groundbreaking Books of the 20th century, stating that it had "a profound impact", particularly over the confessional poetry movement that the book helped launch. The editors of Contemporary Literary Criticism wrote that the book "exerted a profound influence on subsequent American poets, including other first generation confessionalists such as Sylvia Plath and Anne Sexton." In a 1962 interview, Sylvia Plath stated that Life Studies had influenced the poetry she was writing at that time (and which her husband, Ted Hughes, would publish posthumously as Ariel a few years later): "I've been very excited by what I feel is the new breakthrough that came with, say, Robert Lowell's Life Studies, this intense breakthrough into very serious, very personal, emotional experience which I feel has been partly taboo. Robert Lowell's poems about his experience in a mental hospital, for example, interested me very much." In an essay published in 1985, the poet Stanley Kunitz wrote that Life Studies was "perhaps the most influential book of modern verse since T. S. Eliot's The Waste Land."

During the 1960s, Lowell was the most public, well-known American poet; in June 1967, he appeared on the cover of Time as part of a cover story in which he was praised as "the best American poet of his generation." Although the article gave a general overview of modern American poetry (mentioning Lowell's contemporaries like John Berryman and Elizabeth Bishop), Lowell's life, career, and place in the American literary canon remained the article's focus.

=== Relationships ===
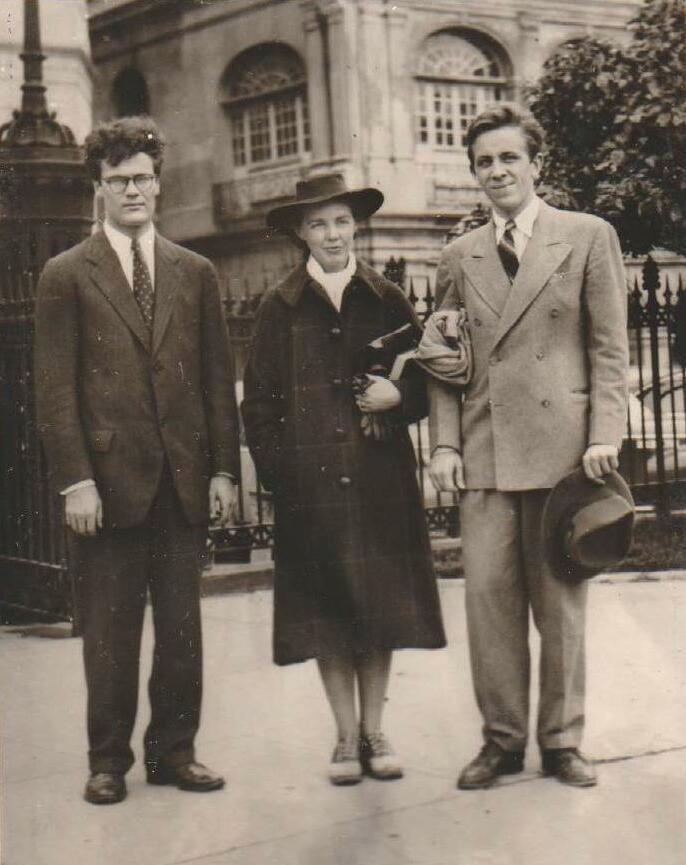
Robert Lowell, Jean Stafford (Lowell's first wife), and Peter Taylor in front of The Presbytere at Jackson Square in New Orleans in 1941. Photo by Robie Macauley

Lowell married the novelist and short-story writer Jean Stafford in 1940. Before their marriage, in 1938, Lowell and Stafford were in a serious car crash, in which Lowell was at the wheel, that left Stafford permanently scarred, while Lowell walked away unscathed. The impact crushed Stafford's nose and cheekbone and required her to undergo multiple reconstructive surgeries. The couple had a tumultuous marriage—the poet Anthony Hecht characterized it as "a tormented and tormenting one"— that ended in 1948. Shortly thereafter, in 1949, Lowell married the writer Elizabeth Hardwick with whom he had a daughter, Harriet, in 1957. After Hardwick's death in 2007, The New York Times would characterize the marriage as "restless and emotionally harrowing," reflecting the very public portrait of their marriage and divorce as Lowell captured it in his books For Lizzie and Harriet and The Dolphin. After 23 years of marriage to Elizabeth Hardwick, in 1970, Lowell left her for Caroline Blackwood. Blackwood and Lowell were married in 1972 in England where they decided to settle and where they raised their son, Sheridan. Lowell also became the stepfather to Blackwood's young daughter, Ivana, for whom he would write the sonnet "Ivana," published in his book The Dolphin.

Lowell had a close friendship with the poet Elizabeth Bishop that lasted from 1947 until Lowell's death in 1977. Both writers relied upon one another for critiques of their poetry (which is in evidence in their voluminous correspondence, published in the book Words in Air: the Complete Correspondence between Elizabeth Bishop and Robert Lowell in 2008) and thereby influenced one another's work. Bishop's influence over Lowell can be seen at work in at least two of Lowell's poems: "The Scream" (inspired by Bishop's short story "In the Village") and "Skunk Hour" (inspired by Bishop's poem "The Armadillo"), and the scholar Thomas Travisano notes, more broadly, that "Lowell's Life Studies and For the Union Dead, his most enduringly popular books, were written under Bishop's direct influence."

Lowell also maintained a close friendship with Randall Jarrell from their 1937 meeting at Kenyon College until Jarrell's 1965 death. Lowell openly acknowledged Jarrell's influence over his writing and frequently sought out Jarrell's input regarding his poems before he published them. In a letter to Jarrell from 1957, Lowell wrote, "I suppose we shouldn't swap too many compliments, but I am heavily in your debt."

=== Mental illness ===
Lowell was hospitalized many times throughout his adult life due to bipolar disorder, the mental condition then known as "manic depression." On multiple occasions, Lowell was admitted to the McLean Hospital in Belmont, Massachusetts, and one of his poems, "Waking in the Blue", references his stay in this large psychiatric facility. While bipolar disorder was often a great burden to the writer and his family, it also provided the subject for some of Lowell's most influential poetry, as in his book Life Studies. When he was 50, Lowell began taking lithium to treat the condition. Saskia Hamilton, the editor of Lowell's Letters, notes, "Lithium treatment relieved him from suffering the idea that he was morally and emotionally responsible for the fact that he relapsed. However, it did not entirely prevent relapses... And he was troubled and anxious about the impact of his relapses on his family and friends until the end of his life."

=== Death ===
Lowell died from a heart attack in a taxicab in Manhattan on September 12, 1977, at the age of 60, while on his way to see his ex-wife, Elizabeth Hardwick. He was buried in Stark Cemetery in Dunbarton, New Hampshire.

== Writing ==
=== 1940s ===
Lowell's early poetry was "characterized by its Christian motifs and symbolism, historical references, and intricate formalism." His first three volumes were notably influenced by the New Critics, particularly Lowell's former professors, John Crowe Ransom and Allen Tate.

Lowell's first book of poems, Land of Unlikeness (1944) was also highly influenced by Lowell's conversion to Catholicism, leading Tate to call Lowell "a Catholic poet" in his introduction to the volume. The book was published by a small press as a limited edition, but still received some "decent reviews" from major publications like Poetry and Partisan Review.

In 1946, Lowell received wide acclaim for his next book, Lord Weary's Castle, which included five poems slightly revised from Land of Unlikeness and thirty new poems. Among the better-known poems in the volume are "Mr. Edwards and the Spider" and "The Quaker Graveyard in Nantucket." Lord Weary's Castle was awarded the Pulitzer Prize in 1947. That year, Lowell also was awarded a Guggenheim fellowship.

Randall Jarrell gave Lord Weary's Castle high praise, writing, "It is unusually difficult to say which are the best poems in Lord Weary's Castle: several are realized past changing, successes that vary only in scope and intensity--others are poems that almost any living poet would be pleased to have written ... [and] one or two of these poems, I think, will be read as long as men remember English."

Following soon after his success with Lord Weary's Castle, Lowell served as the Consultant in Poetry to the Library of Congress from 1947 to 1948 (a position now known as the U.S. Poet Laureate).

=== 1950s ===
In 1951, Lowell published The Mills of the Kavanaughs, which centered on its epic title poem and failed to receive the high praise that his previous book had received. Although it received a generally positive review in The New York Times, Randall Jarrell gave the book a mixed review. Although Jarrell liked the shorter poems, he thought the epic title poem didn't work, stating ""The people [in 'The Mills of the Kavanaughs'] too often seem to be acting in the manner of Robert Lowell, rather than plausibly as real people act . . .I doubt that many readers will think them real." Following The Mills of the Kavanaughs, Lowell hit a creative roadblock and took a long break from publishing. However, by the end of the decade, he started writing again and changed stylistic direction with his next book of verse, Life Studies (1959), which won the National Book Award for poetry in 1960 and became the most influential book that Lowell would ever publish. In his acceptance speech for the National Book Award, Lowell famously divided American poetry into two camps: the "cooked" and the "raw." This commentary by Lowell was made in reference to the popularity of Allen Ginsberg and the Beat Generation poets and was a signal from Lowell that he was trying to incorporate some of their "raw" energy into his own poetry.

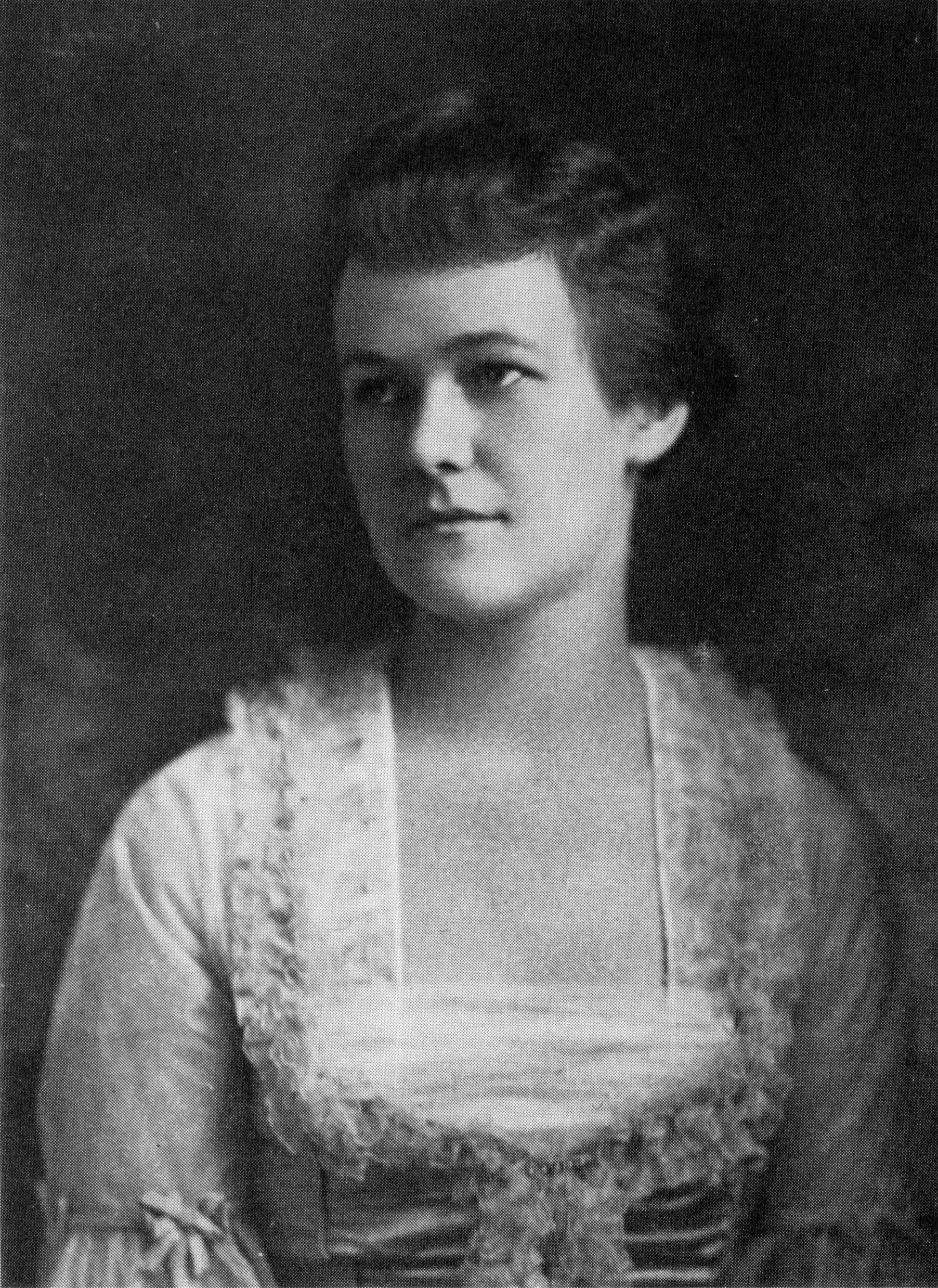
Lowell's mother, Charlotte Winslow Lowell, in 1915. Along with Lowell's father and grandfather, she is a central subject in Life Studies, specifically in the poems "Sailing Home From Rapallo," "91 Revere Street," and "Commander Lowell".

The poems in Life Studies were written in a mix of free and metered verse, with much more informal language than he had used in his first three books. It marked both a turning point in Lowell's career and a turning point for American poetry in general. Because many of the poems documented details from Lowell's family life and personal problems, one critic, M. L. Rosenthal, labeled these poems "confessional" in a review of Life Studies that first appeared in The Nation magazine. Lowell's editor and friend Frank Bidart notes in his afterword to Lowell's Collected Poems, "Lowell is widely, perhaps indelibly associated with the term 'confessional,'" though Bidart questions the accuracy of this label. But for better or worse, this label stuck and led to Lowell being grouped together with other influential confessional poets like Lowell's former students W. D. Snodgrass, Sylvia Plath, and Anne Sexton.

=== 1960s ===
Lowell followed Life Studies with Imitations (1961), a volume of loose translations of poems by classical and modern European poets, including Rilke, Montale, Baudelaire, Pasternak, and Rimbaud, for which he received the 1962 Bollingen Poetry Translation Prize. However, critical response to Imitations was mixed and sometimes hostile (as was the case with Vladimir Nabokov's public response to Lowell's Mandelstam translations). In a review of Lowell's Collected Poems, the poet Michael Hofmann wrote that although he thought Life Studies was Lowell's best book, Imitations was Lowell's most "pivotal book," arguing that the book "marks the entry into his work of what one might term 'international style', something coolly open to not-quite-English." In the book's introduction, Lowell explained that his idiosyncratic translations should be thought of as "imitations" rather than strict translations since he took many liberties with the originals, trying to "do what [his] authors might have done if they were writing their poems now and in America."

Also in 1961, Lowell published his English translation of the French verse play Phèdre by 17th century playwright Jean Racine. Lowell changed the spelling of the title of the play to Phaedra. This translation was Lowell's first attempt at translating a play, and the piece received a generally positive review from The New York Times. Broadway director and theater critic Harold Clurman wrote that Lowell's Phaedra was "a close paraphrase of Racine with a slightly Elizabethan tinge; it nevertheless renders a great deal of the excitement--if not the beauty--which exists in the original." Clurman accepted Lowell's contention that he wrote his version in a meter reminiscent of Dryden and Pope, and while Clurman conceded that the feel of Lowell's version was very different from the feel of French verse, Clurman considered it to be like "a finely fiery English poem," particularly in passages where "Lowell's muse took flame from Racine's shade."

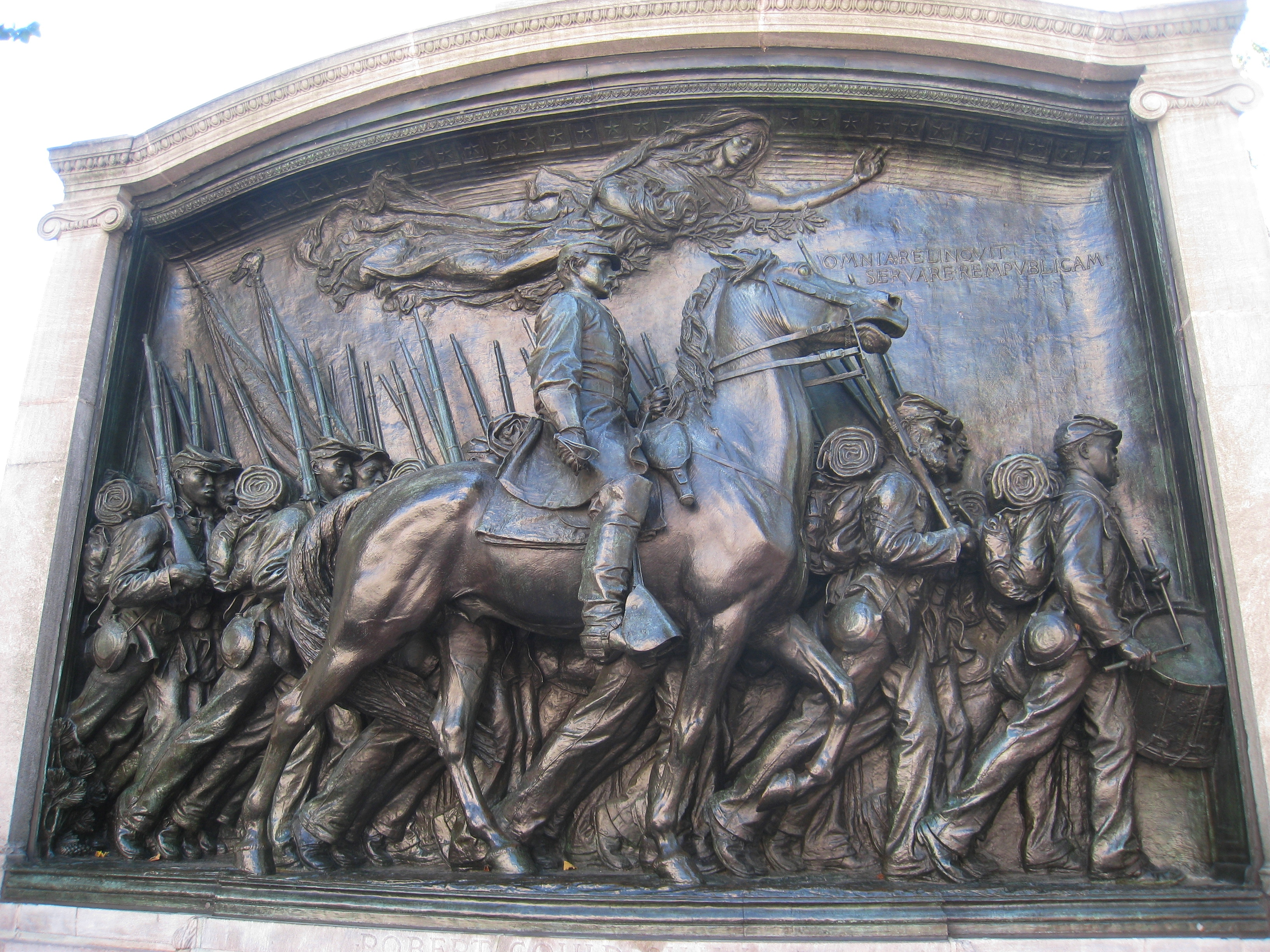
The Memorial to Robert Gould Shaw and the 54th Massachusetts Volunteer Infantry Regiment by Augustus Saint-Gaudens in Boston. The bronze bas-relief memorial figures prominently in Lowell's poem "For the Union Dead."

Lowell's next book of original verse For the Union Dead (1964) was widely praised, particularly for its title poem, which invoked Allen Tate's "Ode to the Confederate Dead." Helen Vendler states that that poem "honors not only the person of [the Civil War hero] Robert Gould Shaw, but also the stern and beautiful memorial bronze bas-relief [depicting Shaw and the all-black 54th Massachusetts Volunteer Infantry Regiment] ... which stands opposite the Boston State House." Paula Hayes observes that, in this volume, "Lowell turned his attention toward ecology, Civil Rights, and labor rights ... often to the effect of combining the three concerns." For the Union Dead was Lowell's first book since Life Studies to contain all original verse (since it did not include any translations), and in writing the poems in this volume, Lowell built upon the looser, more personal style of writing that he had established in the final section of Life Studies. Lowell also wrote about a number of world historical figures in poems like "Caligula," "Jonathan Edwards in Western Massachusetts," and "Lady Raleigh's Lament," and he combined personal and public concerns in poems like the title poem and "Fall 1961" which addressed Lowell's fear of nuclear war during the height of the Cold War.

In 1964, Lowell also wrote three one-act plays that were meant to be performed together as a trilogy, titled The Old Glory. The first two parts, "Endecott the Red Cross" and "My Kinsman, Major Molineux" were stage adaptations of short stories by Nathaniel Hawthorne, and the third part, "Benito Cereno," was a stage adaptation of a novella by Herman Melville. The Old Glory was produced off-Broadway at the American Place Theatre in New York City in 1964 and directed by Jonathan Miller. It won five Obie Awards in 1965 including an award for "Best American Play." The play was published in its first printing in 1965 (with a revised edition following in 1968).

In 1967, Lowell published his next book of poems, Near the Ocean. With this volume, Lowell returned to writing more formal, metered verse. The second half of the book also shows Lowell returning once again to writing loose translations (including verse approximations of Dante, Juvenal, and Horace). The best-known poem in this volume is "Waking Early Sunday Morning," which was written in eight-line tetrameter stanzas (borrowed from Andrew Marvell's poem "Ode upon Cromwell's Return from Ireland") and showed contemporary American politics overtly entering into Lowell's work. Ian Hamilton noted that "'Waking Early Sunday Morning' is now thought of as a key 'political poem' of the 1960s."

Pity the planet, all joy gone
from this sweet volcanic cone;
peace to our children when they fall
in small war on the heels of small
war—until the end of time
to police the earth, a ghost
orbiting forever lost
in our monotonous sublime.

— From "Waking Early Sunday Morning,"
Near the Ocean (1967)

During 1967 and 1968, Lowell experimented with a verse journal, first published as Notebook 1967-68 (and later republished in a revised and expanded edition, titled Notebook). Lowell referred to these fourteen-line poems as sonnets although they sometimes failed to incorporate regular meter and rhyme (both of which are defining features of the sonnet form); however, some of Lowell's sonnets (particularly the ones in Notebook 1967-1968) were written in blank verse with a definitive pentameter and a small handful also included rhyme. Regarding the issue of meter in these poems, Lowell wrote "My meter, fourteen line unrhymed blank verse sections, is fairly strict at first and elsewhere, but often corrupts in single lines to the freedom of prose."

In the Notebook poems, Lowell included the poem "In The Cage," a sonnet that he had originally published in Lord Weary's Castle. He also included revised, sonnet versions of the poems "Caligula" and "Night-Sweat" (originally published in For the Union Dead) and of "1958" and "To Theodore Roethke: 1908-1963" (originally published in Near the Ocean). In his "Afterthought" at the end of Notebook 1967-1968, Lowell explained the premise and timeline of the book:

This is not my diary, my confession, not a puritan's too literal pornographic honesty, glad to share private embarrassment, and triumph. The time is a summer, an autumn, a winter, a spring, another summer; here the poem ends, except for turned-back bits of fall and winter 1968 ... My plot rolls with the seasons. The separate poems and sections are opportunist and inspired by impulse. Accident threw up subjects, and the plot swallowed them--famished for human chances. I lean heavily to the rational, but am devoted to surrealism.

In this same "Afterthought" section, Lowell acknowledges some of his source materials for the poems, writing, "I have taken from many books, used the throwaway conversational inspirations of my friends, and much more that I idly spoke to myself." Some of the sources and authors he cites include Jesse Glenn Gray's The Warriors, Simone Weil's Half a Century Gone, Herbert Marcuse, Aijaz Ahmad, R. P. Blackmur, Plutarch, Stonewall Jackson, and Ralph Waldo Emerson.

Steven Gould Axelrod wrote that, "[Lowell's concept behind the sonnet form] was to achieve the balance of freedom and order, discontinuity and continuity, that he [had] observed in [Wallace] Stevens's late long poems and in John Berryman's Dream Songs, then nearing completion. He hoped that his form ... would enable him 'to describe the immediate instant,' an instant in which political and personal happenings interacted with a lifetime's accumulation of memories, dreams, and knowledge." Lowell liked the new form so much that he reworked and revised many of the poems from Notebook and used them as the foundation for his next three volumes of verse, all of which employed the same loose, fourteen-line sonnet form.

In 1969, Lowell made his last foray into dramatic work with the publication of his prose translation of the ancient Greek play Prometheus Bound by Aeschylus. The play was directed by Jonathan Miller, who had previously directed Lowell's The Old Glory, at the Yale School of Drama.

=== 1970s ===
In 1973, Lowell published three books of sonnets. The first two, History and For Lizzie and Harriet, consisted of revised and reordered versions of sonnets from Notebook. History included poems that primarily dealt with world history from antiquity up to the mid-20th century (although the book did not always follow a linear or logical path and contained many poems about Lowell's friends, peers, and family). The second book, For Lizzie and Harriet, included poems that described the breakdown of his second marriage and contained poems that were supposed to be in the voices of his daughter, Harriet, and his second wife, Elizabeth. Finally, the last work in Lowell's sonnet sequence, The Dolphin (1973), which won the 1974 Pulitzer Prize, included poems about his daughter, his ex-wife, and his new wife Caroline Blackwood whom he had affectionately nicknamed "Dolphin." The book only contained new poems, making it the only book in Lowell's 1973 sonnet trilogy not to include revised and reordered poems from Notebook.

A minor controversy erupted when Lowell admitted to having incorporated (and altered) private letters from his ex-wife, Elizabeth Hardwick into poems for The Dolphin. He was particularly criticized for this by his friends Adrienne Rich and Elizabeth Bishop. Bishop presented Lowell with an argument against publishing The Dolphin. In a letter to Lowell regarding The Dolphin, dated March 21, 1972, before he'd published the book, Bishop praised the writing, saying, "Please believe that I think it is wonderful poetry." But then she stated, "I'm sure my point is only too plain ... Lizzie [Hardwick] is not dead, etc.--but there is a 'mixture of fact & fiction' [in the book], and you have changed [Hardwick's] letters. That is 'infinite mischief,' I think ... One can use one's life as material--one does anyway--but these letters--aren't you violating a trust? IF you were given permission--IF you hadn't changed them ... etc. But art just isn't worth that much." Adrienne Rich responded to the controversy quite differently. Instead of sending Lowell a private letter on the matter, she publicly criticized Lowell and his books The Dolphin and To Lizzie and Harriet in a review that appeared in the American Poetry Review and that effectively ended the two poets' long-standing friendship. Rich called the poems "cruel and shallow."

Lowell's sonnets from the Notebook poems through to The Dolphin met with mixed responses upon publication, and critical consensus on the poems continues to be mixed. Some of Lowell's contemporaries, like Derek Walcott and William Meredith, praised the poems. Meredith wrote about Notebook: 1967–68, "Complex and imperfect, like most of the accomplishments of serious men and women today, Robert Lowell's Notebook 1967–68 is nevertheless a beautiful and major work." But a review of History, For Lizzie and Harriet, and The Dolphin by Calvin Bedient in The New York Times was mostly negative. Bedient wrote, "Inchoate and desultory, the poems never accumulate and break in the great way, like a waterfall seen from the lip, more felt than seen. In truth, they are under no pressure to go anywhere, except to the 14th line. Prey to random associations, they are full of false starts, fractures, distractions." The sonnets also received a negative review by William Pritchard in the Hudson Review. Since the release of Lowell's Collected Poems in 2003, a number of critics and poets have praised the sonnets, including Michael Hofmann, William Logan, and Richard Tillinghast (though Logan and Hofmann note that they both strongly preferred the original Notebook versions of the sonnets over the revised versions that Lowell published in History and To Lizzie and Harriet). Still the sonnet volumes have received recent negative responses as well. In an otherwise glowing review of Lowell's Collected Poems, A.O. Scott wrote, "The three sonnet sequences Lowell published in 1973 ... occupy nearly 300 pages, and reading them, one damn sonnet after the other, induces more stupor than rapture." And in her review of the Collected Poems, Marjorie Perloff called the sonnet poems "trivial and catty," considering them to be Lowell's least important volumes.

Lowell published his last volume of poetry, Day by Day, in 1977, the year of his death. In May 1977, Lowell won the $10,000 National Medal for Literature awarded by the American Academy and Institute of Arts and Letters, and Day by Day was awarded that year's National Book Critics Circle Award for poetry. In a documentary on Lowell, Anthony Hecht said that "[Day by Day was] a very touching, moving, gentle book, tinged with a sense of [Lowell's] own pain and the pain [he'd] given to others." It was Lowell's only volume to contain nothing but free verse. In many of the poems, Lowell reflects on his life, his past relationships, and his own mortality. The best-known poem from this collection is the last one, titled "Epilogue," in which Lowell reflects upon the "confessional" school of poetry with which his work was associated. In this poem he wrote,

But sometimes everything I write

with the threadbare art of my eye
seems a snapshot,
lurid, rapid, garish, grouped,
heightened from life,
yet paralyzed by fact.
All's misalliance.

Yet why not say what happened?

In her article "Intimacy and Agency in Robert Lowell's Day by Day," Reena Sastri notes that critical response to the book has been mixed, stating that during the initial publication of the book, some critics considered the book "a failure" while other critics, like Helen Vendler and Marjorie Perloff, considered it a success. She also notes that in reviews of Lowell's Collected Poems in 2003, Day by Day received mixed responses or was ignored by reviewers. Sastri herself argues that the book is under-appreciated and misunderstood. The book has received significant critical attention from Helen Vendler who has written about the book in essays and in her book Last Looks, Last Books: Stevens, Plath, Lowell, Bishop, Merrill (2010). In her essay "Robert Lowell's Last Days and Last Poems," she defended the book from attacks following its publication in reviews like the one written by the poet Donald Hall in which Hall called the book a failure, writing that he thought the book was "as slack and meretricious as Notebook and History which preceded it." Vendler argued that most critics of the book were disappointed because Lowell's last book was so much different from any of his previous volumes, abandoning ambitious metaphors and political engagement for more personal snapshots. She wrote, "Now [Lowell] has ended [his career], in Day by Day, as a writer of disarming openness, exposing shame and uncertainty, offering almost no purchase to interpretation, and in his journal-keeping, abandoning conventional structure, whether rhetorical or logical. The poems drift from one focus to another; they avoid the histrionic; they sigh more often than they expostulate. They acknowledge exhaustion; they expect death." She praises some of Lowell's descriptions, particularly of impotence, depression, and old age.

=== Posthumous publications ===
In 1987, Lowell's longtime editor, Robert Giroux, edited Lowell's Collected Prose. The collection included Lowell's book reviews, essays, excerpts from an unfinished autobiography, and an excerpt from an unfinished book, tentatively titled A Moment in American Poetry.

Lowell's Collected Poems, edited by Frank Bidart and David Gewanter, was published in 2003. The Collected Poems was a very comprehensive volume that included all of Lowell's major works with the exception of Notebook 1967-1968 and Notebook. However, many of the poems from these volumes were republished, in revised forms, in History and For Lizzie and Harriet. Soon after the publication of The Collected Poems, The Letters of Robert Lowell, edited by Saskia Hamilton, was published in 2005. Both Lowell's Collected Poems and his Letters received positive critical responses from the mainstream press.

Lowell's Memoirs, including a previously unpublished youthful diary, were edited by Steven Axelrod and Grzegorz Kość in 2022.

== Tributes ==
In 2001, the alternative rock band They Might Be Giants wrote and recorded a song called "Robert Lowell" which uses Lowell's poem "Memories of West Street and Lepke" as the basis for the lyrics.

Lowell's friendship with Elizabeth Bishop was the subject of the play Dear Elizabeth by Sarah Ruhl which was first performed at the Yale Repertory Theater in 2012. Ruhl used Words in Air: The Complete Correspondence Between Elizabeth Bishop and Robert Lowell as the basis for her play.

Lowell was a featured subject in the 2014 HBO documentary The 50 Year Argument about The New York Review of Books which Lowell and his second wife, Elizabeth Hardwick, were both involved in founding. Although Lowell was not involved with editing the review, he was a frequent contributor. Lowell is featured in voice-over, photographs, video, and Derek Walcott reads from an essay on Lowell that Walcott published in The New York Review of Books after Lowell's death.

== Bibliography ==
- Land of Unlikeness (1944)
- Lord Weary's Castle (1946)
- The Mills of The Kavanaughs (1951)
- Life Studies (1959)
- Phaedra (translation) (1961)
- Imitations (1961)
- Nathaniel Hawthorne, 1804-1864 (limited edition keepsake of centenary commemoration of Hawthorne's death), Ohio State University Press (1964)
- For the Union Dead (1964)
- The Old Glory (1965) (revised edition 1968)
- The Achievement of Robert Lowell: A Comprehensive Selection of His Poems, edited and introduced by William J. Martz, Scott, Foresman (1966)
- Near the Ocean (1967)
- R. F. K., 1925-1968 privately printed limited edition (1969)
- Notebook 1967-1968 (1969) (revised and expanded as Notebook, 1970)
- The Voyage & other versions of poems of Baudelaire (1969)
- Prometheus Bound (translation) (1969)
- Poesie, 1940-1970 (English with Italian translations), Longanesi (Milan), (1972)
- History (1973)
- For Lizzie and Harriet (1973)
- The Dolphin (1973)
- Selected Poems (1976) (Revised Edition, 1977)
- Day by Day (1977)
- The Oresteia of Aeschylus (1978)
- Collected Prose (1987)
- Collected Poems (2003)
- Selected Poems (2006) (Expanded Edition)
- Memoirs. New York: Farrar, Straus and Giroux. 2022.
