= Charles Russell Lowell =

American businessman and soldier (1835–1864)

Charles Russell Lowell III
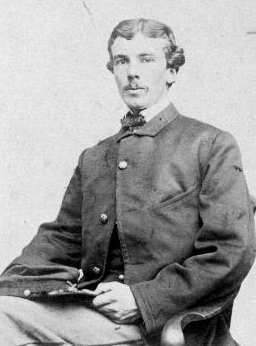
- Born: January 2, 1835; Boston, Massachusetts, U.S.
- Died: October 20, 1864 (aged 29); Middletown, Virginia, U.S.
- Burial place: Mount Auburn Cemetery, Cambridge, Massachusetts
- Spouse(s): Josephine Shaw (m. 1863–1864; his death)
- Children: Carlotta Russell Lowell
- Relatives: Charles Russell Lowell, Jr. (father); Anna Cabot Jackson (mother); Charles Russell Lowell, Sr. (grandfather); Patrick Tracy Jackson (grandfather); Robert Traill Spence Lowell (uncle); James Russell Lowell (uncle)
- Military career
- Allegiance: United States; Union
- Branch: United States Army; Union Army
- Service years: 1861–1864
- Rank: Brigadier General
- Commands: 2nd Massachusetts Cavalry
- Conflicts: American Civil War; Peninsula Campaign; Battle of Antietam; Battle of Cedar Creek (DOW)

Charles Russell Lowell III (January 2, 1835 – October 20, 1864) was an American railroad executive and a Union Army general during the American Civil War. He was mortally wounded at the Battle of Cedar Creek.

== Early life ==
Charles Russell Lowell III was born in Boston, Massachusetts on January 2, 1835. His mother, Anna Cabot Jackson, a daughter of Patrick Tracy Jackson, married Charles Russell Lowell, Jr., brother of Robert Traill Spence Lowell and James Russell Lowell. Charles Jr., Robert, and James were sons of Unitarian Minister Charles Lowell. Anna wrote verse and books on education. Lowell III graduated as the valedictorian from Harvard College in 1854, and worked in an iron mill in Trenton, New Jersey, for a few months in 1855. He spent two years abroad, and from 1858 to 1860 was local treasurer of the Burlington and Missouri River Railroad. In 1860, he took charge of the Mount Savage Iron Works in Cumberland, Maryland.

== Civil War ==
Lowell entered the Union Army in June 1861, and was commissioned as a captain in the 3rd U.S. Cavalry, transferring to the 6th U.S. Cavalry in August. He served as an aide-de-camp to General George B. McClellan during the formation of the Army of the Potomac in the summer and fall of 1861 and continued at McClellan's side during the 1862 Peninsula Campaign and the Battle of Antietam.

In 1863 Lowell recruited and organized the 2nd Massachusetts Cavalry, and on May 10 was appointed its colonel. During the winter of 1863–1864, he was in charge of the outer defenses of Washington, D.C., and was engaged in repelling the raid by Confederate Lt. Gen. Jubal Early that reached the outskirts of the capital. In February, 1864, near Vienna, Virginia Lowell ordered the drumhead execution of William E. "Pony" Ormsby, a deserter and traitor who fled to join Colonel John S. Mosby's (CSA) campaign.

During the Valley Campaigns of 1864, Lowell commanded a brigade of cavalry in Brig. Gen. Wesley Merritt's division of the Cavalry Corps of Maj. Gen. Philip Sheridan's army. He distinguished himself at Third Winchester and took a leading role in the Confederate rout at Tom's Brook. He was mortally wounded during the Union counterattack at the Battle of Cedar Creek on October 19, 1864. General Sheridan interceded to ensure that he was promoted to brigadier general on that day. He died on the next day at Middletown, Virginia, at the age of 29. He is buried in the Mount Auburn Cemetery, Cambridge, Massachusetts.

Lowell was nominated as a brigadier general two days after his death. Since he was unable to sign his new commission after his death, Secretary of War Edwin M. Stanton authorized an exception allowing the posthumous promotion to become official. Upon hearing of his death, General George Armstrong Custer wept and Sheridan remarked "I do not think there was a quality which I could have added to Lowell. He was the perfection of a man and a soldier."

== Personal life ==
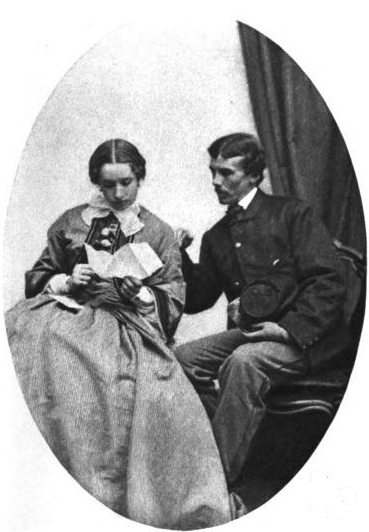
Josephine Shaw and Colonel Lowell in 1863

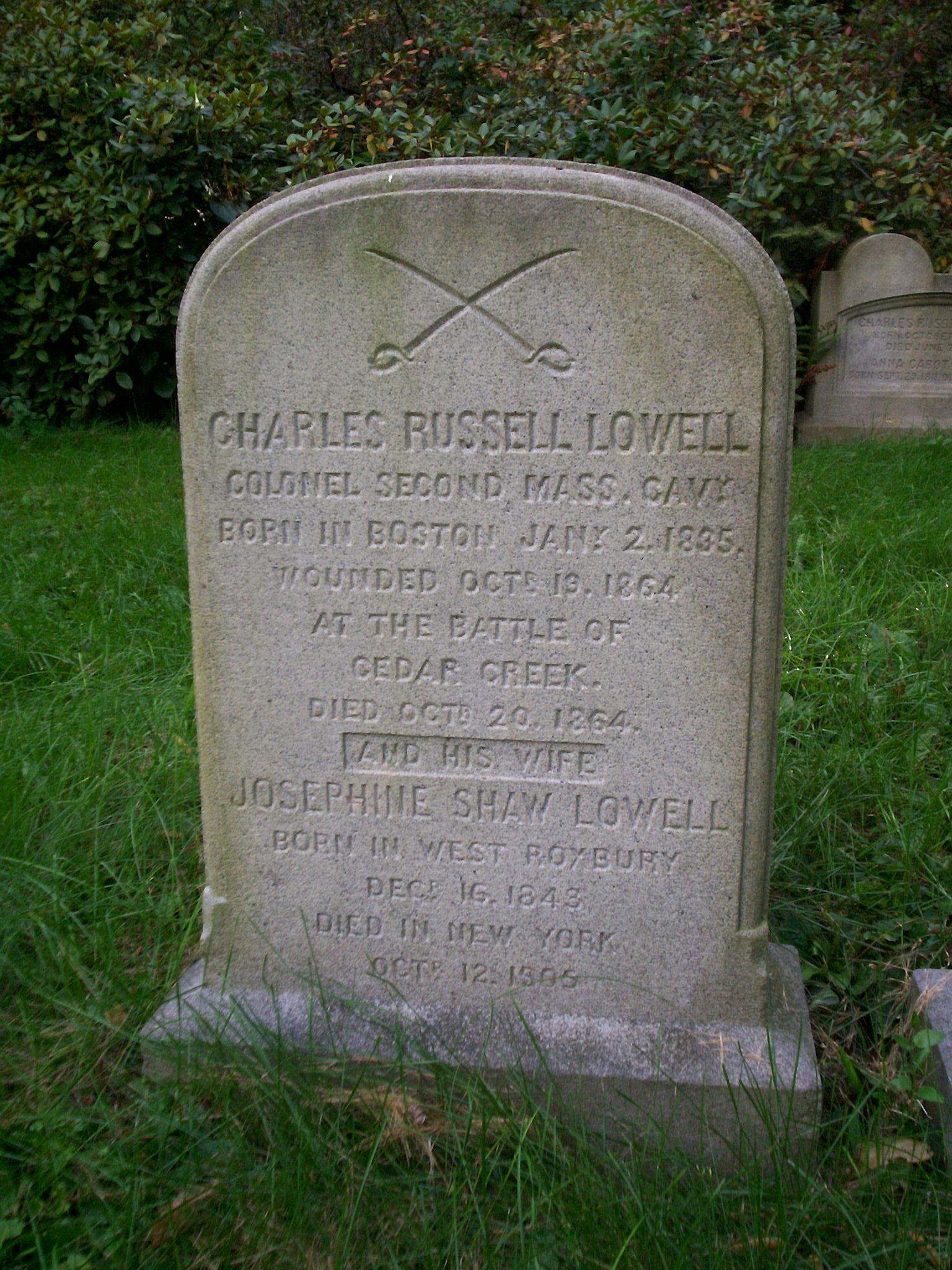
Grave of Charles Russell Lowell at Mount Auburn Cemetery

In October 1863, Lowell married businesswoman Josephine Shaw (1843—1905), a sister of his close friend and fellow Union Army casualty Colonel Robert Gould Shaw (1837—1863). Her home when she was married was on Staten Island, and she became deeply interested in the social problems of New York City. She was a member of the State Charities Aid Society, and from 1876 to 1889 was a member of the New York State Board of Charities, being the first woman appointed to that board. She founded the Charity Organization Society of New York City in 1882, and wrote Public Relief and Private Charity (1884) and Industrial Arbitration and Conciliation (1893). They had one daughter, Carlotta Russell Lowell (November 30, 1864 — September 19, 1924).

Lowell's first biography was written in 1907 by Edward Waldo Emerson, son of Ralph Waldo Emerson.

== See also ==
- List of American Civil War generals (Union)
- List of Massachusetts generals in the American Civil War
- Massachusetts in the American Civil War
