= Mary Lowell Putnam =

American writer (1810–1898)

- Born: Mary Traill Spence Lowell; December 3, 1810; Boston, Massachusetts, U.S.
- Died: June 1, 1898 (aged 87); Boston
- Occupation: Author
- Spouse: Samuel R. Putnam (m. 1832)
- Father: Charles Lowell
- Relatives: James Russell Lowell (brother)

Mary Traill Spence Lowell Putnam (December 3, 1810 – June 1, 1898) was an American author.

== Life ==
Mary Traill Spence Lowell was the daughter of the Unitarian minister Charles Lowell, and the sister of James Russell Lowell and Robert Traill Spence Lowell. She had an aptitude for acquiring languages: she was eventually fluent in French, Italian, German, Polish, Swedish and Hungarian, and familiar with many other languages. She married Samuel R. Putnam in 1832 and later traveled abroad for several years.

Putnam's literary work was confined to magazine writing until 1844, when she translated from the Swedish Fredrika Bremer's The Handmaid. (Note: Mary Howitt had done an earlier English translation in 1842 from a German version.) She contributed to the North American Review articles on Polish and Hungarian literature (1848–1850), and to the Christian Examiner on the history of Hungary (1850–1851).

In 1850 she anonymously published a History of the Constitution of Hungary in Its Relations to Austria. Her name became widely known when she became involved in a controversy with Francis Bowen, editor of the North American Review, regarding the war in Hungary. Bowen attacked the Hungarian revolutionists, whom she upheld.

From 1851 to 1857 Putnam lived in France and Germany, improving her language skills. Returning to the United States, she became a prominent abolitionist writer, and wrote two dramas on slavery.

== Works ==
- History of the Constitution of Hungary, published the year before the 1851 visit of Louis Kossuth to the United States (1850)
- Record of an Obscure Man, a novel, published anonymously (1861)
- The Tragedy of Errors and The Tragedy of Success, a dramatic poem in two parts on slavery in the southern United States (1862)
- Memoir of William Lowell Putnam, on her son (1840-1861), who died at Ball's Bluff in the Civil War (1862)
- Fifteen Days (1866)
- Memoir of Charles Lowell, her father (1885)
