= The Mills of The Kavanaughs =

1951 poetry collection by Robert Lowell

The Mills of the Kavanaughs
- First edition
- Author: Robert Lowell
- Language: English
- Publisher: Harcourt Brace
- Publication date: 1951
- Preceded by: Lord Weary's Castle
- Followed by: Life Studies

The Mills of the Kavanaughs is the third book of poems written by the American poet Robert Lowell. Like Lowell's previous book, Lord Weary's Castle, the poetry in Kavanaughs was also ornate, formal, dense, and metered. All of the poems are dramatic monologues, and the literary scholar Helen Vendler noted that the poems in this volume "were clearly influenced by Frost's narrative poems as well as by Browning."

== "The Mills of the Kavanaughs" (poem) ==
The majority of the book consists of the epic title poem which tells the story of Anne Kavanaugh, a widow living in Maine in 1943, who "is sitting in her garden playing solitaire" and Lowell tells her story through a series of stream-of-consciousness flashbacks in which she recalls her troubled relationship with her now-deceased husband, Harry.

The editors of Lowell's Collected Poems, Frank Bidart and David Gewanter, include a large footnote on the poem with an excerpt from Hugh Staples' book Robert Lowell: The First Twenty Years (1962) in which Staples provides the following summary of the poem's plot in flashback:

Anne [grew up as] a poor girl from a family of thirteen children, who [was] first adopted by the Kavanaughs and then [got] married to the youngest son, Harry. . .Joining the Navy prior to Pearl Harbor, her husband returns from the war on the verge of a nervous breakdown; he attempts and fails to suffocate his wife in bed one night because she speaks aloud, while asleep, to a man in a dream; Harry fears that she has committed adultery. Shortly thereafter, greatly distraught, he [dies].

Staples notes that "Ovid's mythological account of Persephone in Metamorphoses V . . .is brought into play [throughout the poem].

The poem was published in two additional versions that were quite different from the version in The Mills of the Kavanaughs. First, there was a magazine version of the poem that appeared in the Kenyon Review in 1951 prior to the publication of The Mills of the Kavanaughs. The editors of Lowell's Collected Poems note that the magazine version included references to the Virgin Mary and Saint Patrick that Lowell later removed. Then, many years after the publication of the poem in The Mills of the Kavanaughs, the poem re-appeared in a new version when Lowell released his Selected Poems in 1976. In this volume, he included a significantly shorter version of the poem in which he pared the epic 38 stanza poem down to just five stanzas.

Lillian Feder discusses how the myth of Persephone is an important part of the poem in Anne Kavanaugh's thinking.

== The Shorter Poems ==
The other poems from the book, all significantly shorter than the title poem, include "Falling Asleep over the Aeneid," "Her Dead Brother," "Mother Marie Therese," "David and Bathsheba in the Public Garden," "The Fat Man in the Mirror" (which is based on a poem by the Austrian poet Franz Werfel), and "Thanksgiving's Over."

The last poem in the book, "Thanksgiving's Over," is similar to "The Mills of the Kavanaughs" in its basic premise. However, instead of a wife remembering her deceased husband, this time the roles are reversed and the widowed husband remembers his deceased wife (in this poem, the recollection occurs in a dream).

The poem "David and Bathsheba in the Public Garden" would later reappear in Lowell's book For the Union Dead in a revised form under the title "The Public Garden." During Lowell's 1963 public reading at the Guggenheim, he explained that many of his readers expressed confusion over the presence of the Biblical characters of David and Bathsheba being located in a modern park in Boston, and according to Lowell, the characters made the poem "impenetrable." So in order to make the poem more accessible, Lowell decided to completely remove David and Bathsheba from the revised, later version of the poem which was shorter and much more personal.

== Response ==
In a review of the book in The New York Times, Charles Poore praised the book, writing, "The Mills of the Kavanaughs. . . is a fine new collection of poems in angular, stony meters, sometimes as obscure as one end of an overheard telephone conversation, always savagely brilliant in their hard impact on the mind."

However, Randall Jarrell's review of the book in Partisan Review was much more measured in its assessment. Although Jarrell liked the handful of shorter poems in the collection, he was critical of the main characters in the epic, title poem, writing, "The people [in 'The Mills of the Kavanaughs'] too often seem to be acting in the manner of Robert Lowell, rather than plausibly as real people act . . .I doubt that many readers will think them real."

In a review of Lowell's Collected Poems in 2003, A. O. Scott wrote that the book was "underrated" and that the dramatic monologues in The Mills of the Kavanaughs were "some of the best in the language since Browning."

The Poetry Foundation website notes that The Mills of the Kavanaughs was "less successful" than Lowell's previous book, Lord Weary's Castle, which had won the Pulitzer Prize for Poetry.
