= Donald James Winslow =

Donald James Winslow (1911 – 10 July 2010) was a professor at Boston University in Boston, United States who specialized in the subject of biography.

== Life ==
Donald James Winslow was born in 1911, the third of four children of Guy Winslow, president of Lasell Junior College in Auburndale, Massachusetts. His father was a trustee of Tufts College and a friend of John Cousens, who would become president of Tufts. During his childhood, he met guests who spoke at Lasell such as the poet Robert Frost. He graduated from Newton High School in 1929, and was admitted to Tufts, earning a BA in English in 1934 and an MA in English in 1935. He began teaching in the Boston University department of English in 1936, first as a teaching fellow and then as an instructor. He earned a PhD from the university in 1942, and then joined US Army Air Corps Weather Service, serving there until 1946.

Returning to Boston University, Winslow rejoined the English Department, becoming a full Professor in 1953. He chaired the English department at Boston University from 1952 to 1962. Winslow hired the poet Robert Lowell as a teacher in the English department, and Lowell in turn taught the poets Sylvia Plath and Anne Sexton. Winslow was drawn to the subject of biography, becoming the bibliographer of the University of Hawaii's quarterly magazine Biography and giving one of the first university courses on the subject of biography. He also taught courses on "Thomas Hardy", "Virginia Woolf", "The Age of Johnson", "The Age of Pope" and "Literature of the Eighteenth Century".

Winslow retired from the university in 1977. He died of heart failure on 10 July 2010 at the age of 98. The archives of Lasell College are named after Winslow, who gathered and established the collection.

== Work ==
Winslow wrote his master's thesis and doctoral dissertation on the British writer Thomas Hardy. In 1938, he took a bicycle tour of Dorset, England, where he met Hardy's sister Kate. Later he wrote a monograph about Kate Hardy. After retiring from the university, in 1987 he published a book Lasell: A History of the First Junior College for Women. He also published a Glossary of Terms on Life Writing.

== Bibliography ==
- Donald James Winslow (1935). Love in the novels of Thomas Hardy. Tufts College.
- Donald J. Winslow (1980). Life-writing: a glossary of terms in biography, autobiography, and related forms. University of Hawaii Press for the Biographical Research Center. ISBN 0-8248-0748-0.
- Donald J. Winslow, F. B. Pinion (1982). Thomas Hardy's sister Kate. Thomas Hardy Society. ISBN 0-904398-30-7.
- Donald J. Winslow (1987). Lasell: a history of the first junior college for women. Lasell Junior College. ISBN 0-9619720-0-9.
- George Lane, Donald J. Winslow (1991). Survivors: the faculty experience at Lasell in the administrations of Greene, Griffin and Mitchell.
