= The Quaker Graveyard in Nantucket =

1946 poem by Robert Lowell

The Quaker Graveyard in Nantucket is an influential poem by Robert Lowell. It was first published in 1946 in his collection Lord Weary's Castle.

The poem is written in an irregular combination of pentameter and trimeter and divided into seven sections. It is dedicated to Lowell's cousin, "Warren Winslow, Dead At Sea." According to the Notes in Lowell's Collected Poems, "The body of Warren Winslow . . .was never recovered after his Navy destroyer, Turner, sank from an accidental explosion in New York harbor during World War II."

== Content ==
Section I describes the discovery, by a fleet of warships, of a sailor's corpse at sea on the North Atlantic "off Madaket" (which is a harbor on Nantucket Island) and its reburial with military honours, ending with the gun salute.

It also makes the first reference to Herman Melville's Moby-Dick, specifically to the fictional character Captain Ahab. Throughout the poem, Lowell uses the fate of the fictional Pequod, the whaling ship in Moby Dick, as a metaphor for the fate of Warren Winslow and his fellow Navy crewmen of the Turner during World War II.

Section II introduces the Quaker graveyard in Nantucket and Lowell's cousin, and Lowell continues to elaborate his Moby-Dick metaphor in this section.

Section III muses on the death of his cousin and on the dying thoughts and beliefs of the Quaker sailors buried there. Lowell also cryptically references Moby-Dick as "IS, the whited monster" which the critic Hugh Staples interprets as a comparison of the whale with God.

Section IV continues to mix the narrative of the sinking of Winslow's ship the Turner, and the deaths of its crew, with the sinking of the Pequod and the deaths of its crew.

In Section V, Lowell uses the imagery of whale-hunting which he compares with religious sacrifice.

Section VI (separately titled 'Our Lady of Walsingham') makes the religious subtext of some of the previous sections more explicit, invoking a pilgrimage to the saint's shrine in Norfolk, England. He also makes a passing reference to his cousin, Warren Winslow.

In last section of the poem, Section VII Lowell returns to the Nantucket graveyard and imagines the Atlantic Ocean "fouled with the blue sailors,/ Sea monsters, upward angel, downward fish." Lowell ends the poem musing on humankind's origins as having evolved from the "sea's slime", and the biblical irony that the same ocean from which God "breathed into his face the breath of life" is where sailors often die. Then Lowell ends the poem with the famously ambiguous line, "The Lord survives the rainbow of His will."
