= Anna Cabot Lowell =

American writer (1811–1874)

- Born: 29 September 1811
- Died: 7 January 1874 (aged 62)
- Occupation: Writer
- Spouse(s): Charles Russell Lowell
- Children: Charles Russell Lowell, Anna Lowell Woodbury, James Jackson Lowell
- Parent(s): Patrick Tracy Jackson

Anna Cabot Lowell (September 29, 1811 – January 7, 1874) was an American writer based in Boston.

== Biography ==
Anna Cabot Jackson was born in Boston, Massachusetts, the daughter of Patrick Tracy Jackson. She married Charles Russell Lowell, Jr., son of Charles Russell Lowell, Sr. She was the mother of Civil War general Charles Russell Lowell and daughter Rose, who died at young age in the early 1850s. She died in Cambridge, Massachusetts, in 1874, at the age of 62.

== Works ==
- Theory of Teaching (Boston, 1841)
- Edward's First Lessons in Grammar (1843)
- Gleanings from the Poets, for Home and School (1843)
- Edward's First Lessons in Geometry (1844)
- Olympic Games (1845)
- Outlines of Astronomy, or the World as it Appears (1850)
- Letters to Madame Pulksky, by an American Lady (1852)
- Thoughts on the Education of Girls (1853)
- Seed-Grain for Thought and Discussion (1856)
- Posies for Children, a Book of Verses (1870)

== Note ==
The exact named "Anna Cabot Lowell" was somewhat common in 18th- and 19th-century Boston.
