= Land of Unlikeness =

1944 poetry collection by Robert Lowell

- First edition
- Author: Robert Lowell
- Language: English
- Genre: Poetry
- Publisher: Cummington Press
- Publication date: 1944
- Followed by: Lord Weary's Castle

Land of Unlikeness, Robert Lowell's first book of poetry, was published in 1944 in a limited edition of two hundred and fifty copies by Harry Duncan at the Cummington Press. The poems were all metered, often rhymed, and very much informed by Lowell's recent conversion to Catholicism.

== Background ==
The book contains an introduction by Lowell's one-time teacher and mentor Allen Tate who labels the young Lowell "a Catholic poet." In describing the prevailing style of the book, Tate writes,"[it] is bold and powerful, and the symbolic language often has the effect of being willed; for it is an intellectual style compounded of brilliant puns and shifts of tone; and the willed effect is strengthened by the formal stanzas, to which the language is forced to conform." While not a glowing assessment of Lowell's early work, Tate does conclude that Lowell is an important young poet who "will have to be reckoned with." Tate also states that he prefers the poems in Land of Unlikeness which are less "explicitly religious," citing the poems "A Suicidal Nightmare" and "Death from Cancer."

Five poems from this volume were republished in Lowell's next book, Lord Weary's Castle. Although the book is not particularly well known and was soon completely overshadowed by the Pulitzer Prize-winning Lord Weary's Castle, the full text of Land of Unlikeness, which had been out of print for many years, was reprinted in 2003 in the Appendices Section of Lowell's Collected Poems. The editor of the Collected Poems, Frank Bidart, notes in his "Introduction" to the volume that, during his lifetime, Lowell would not allow Land of Unlikeness to be reprinted, and Bidart states that he thought Lord Weary's Castle was "the book that Land of Unlikeness wanted to be."

== Themes ==
In 2009, the literary scholar Helen Vendler gave a lecture on Lowell in which she commented on early Lowell and the poem "Concord" as it originally appeared in Land of Unlikeness (before Lowell published a slightly altered version in Lord Weary's Castle), stating that "[in this poem], Lowell, in powerful satire, mixes denigration of his revolutionary ancestors, along with denigration of Emerson and his bloodless Unitarianism."
