= Lord Weary's Castle =

1946 poetry collection by Robert Lowell

- First edition
- Author: Robert Lowell
- Language: English
- Genre: Poetry
- Publisher: Harcourt Brace
- Publication date: 1946
- Preceded by: Land of Unlikeness
- Followed by: The Mills of The Kavanaughs

Lord Weary's Castle, Robert Lowell's second book of poetry, won the Pulitzer Prize for Poetry in 1947 when Lowell was only thirty. Robert Giroux, who was the publisher of Lowell's wife at the time, Jean Stafford, also became Lowell's publisher after he saw the manuscript for Lord Weary's Castle and was very impressed; he later stated that Lord Weary's Castle was the most successful book of poems that he ever published.

== Book title ==
In a note before the first poem of the book, Lowell states that the title of the book was derived from "an old ballad." More specifically, in Frank Bidart's notes to Lowell's Collected Poems, Bidart writes that the title comes from "the anonymous Scottish ballad 'Lamkin.'" Bidart goes on to explain that in the ballad's narrative, "Lord Weary refuses to pay the stonemason Lamkin for building his castle; in revenge for this betrayal, Lambkin kills Weary's wife and child."

However, in a review of the book that appeared in Poetry magazine, the critic Austin Warren offered the explanation that the book's title implied that "disaster is befalling the house, and the household, of aristocratic (Calvinist, capitalist) New England, which has failed to pay its moral bills to the 'lower order,' its instruments."

== Style ==
Under the influence of Allen Tate and the New Critics at the beginning of his career, Lowell wrote rigorously formal and dense poetry that won him praise for his exceptionally powerful handling of meter and rhyme. Lord Weary's Castle epitomized this early style which was also notable for its frequently violent imagery. For instance, in "The Quaker Graveyard in Nantucket", the best-known poem from the book, Lowell wrote the following:

The bones cry for the blood of the white whale,
the fat flukes arch and whack about its ears,
the death-lance churns into the sanctuary, tears
the gun-blue swingle, heaving like a flail,
and hacks the coiling life out: it works and drags
and rips the sperm-whale's midriff into rags,

gobbets of blubber spill to wind and weather.

== Themes and subject matter ==
Five of the poems in this collection were revised versions of poems from his first book, Land of Unlikeness (1944). Both Land of Unlikeness and Lord Weary's Castle were influenced by Lowell's conversion from Episcopalianism to Catholicism and explored the dark side of America's Puritan legacy. However, one big difference between these two books is that, in Lord Weary's Castle, Lowell tempers the severe religiosity that characterized many of the poems in Land of Unlikeness.

There are also a number of poems that foreshadow some of Lowell's later poetic modes. Most of the poems in this volume are set in different locations within New England. In the poems "In Memory of Arthur Winslow" and "Mary Winslow", Lowell elegizes his deceased maternal grandparents, both of whom he would later write about in Life Studies. He also writes about a physical fight that he had with his father (during which he "knocked [his] father down") in the poem "Rebellion"; Lowell's description of the same incident would appear later in multiple poems in his book History.

Lord Weary's Castle also includes the first of Lowell's idiosyncratic translations, including "War" (after Rimbaud), "The Shako" (after Rilke), and "Charles the Fifth and the Peasant" (after Valery), and these kinds of loose translation would appear again in later books, notably in Imitations.

In characterizing the book's overarching thematic concerns, Randall Jarrell wrote:

The poems understand the world as a sort of conflict of opposites. In this struggle one opposite is that cake of custom in which all of us lie embedded like lungfish—the statis or inertia of the stubborn self, the obstinate persistence in evil that is damnation. Into this realm of necessity the poems push everything that is closed, turned inward, incestuous, that blinds or binds: the Old Law, imperialism, militarism, capitalism, Calvinism, Authority, the Father, the "proper Bostonians," the rich who will "do everything for the poor except get off their backs." But struggling within this like leaven, falling to it like light, is everything that is free or open, that grows or is willing to change: here is the generosity or openness or willingness that is itself salvation, of the Grace that has replaced the law, of the perfect liberator whom the poet calls Christ.

== Critical response ==
The poet/critic Randall Jarrell praised the book in his essay "From the Kingdom of Necessity" in which he wrote, "Many of the people who reviewed Lord Weary's Castle felt that it was as much of an event as Auden's first book; no one younger than Auden has written better poetry than the best of Robert Lowell's, it seems to me."

He goes on to write, "It is unusually difficult to say which are the best poems in Lord Weary's Castle: several are realized past changing, successes that vary only in scope and intensity—others are poems that almost any living poet would be pleased to have written . . . [and] one or two of these poems will be read as long as men remember English." Jarrell highlights "Colloquy in Black Rock", "Between the Porch and the Altar", "The Death of the Sheriff", and "Where the Rainbow Ends" as some of the best poems in the book.

In a review of the book for The New Yorker, the poet Louise Bogan characterized Lowell's style as "a high pitch of baroque intensity" and compared his writing to the work of John Donne and Herman Melville, adding that " [Lowell's literary] gifts are of a special kind." She singled out for praise the poems "The Quaker Graveyard in Nantucket" and "At the Indian Killer's Grave" as well as Lowell's loose translations, specifically, "The Ghost" (after Sextus Propertius) and "The Fens" (after William Cobbett).

In another review, John Berryman also praised the book, calling Lowell "a talent whose ceiling is invisible." Berryman was particularly impressed with the poems "After the Surprising Conversions," "The Drunken Fisherman" and "The Quaker Graveyard in Nantucket."

In a previously mentioned review of the book that appeared in Poetry magazine, the critic Austin Warren wrote a generally positive review of the book. Though he criticized Lowell's loose translations and the way in which Lowell decided to order the poems, he praised Lowell for his originality and style which he characterized as "richly dialectical," concluding that "the friends of poetry can be pleased, this year at least, by the award [winner] of the Pulitzer Prize." He cited "At the Indian Killer's Grave," "The Quaker Graveyard in Nantucket," "Mary Winslow," "In Memory of Arthur Winslow," "Where The Rainbow Ends," and "To Peter Taylor" as some of his favorite poems in the collection.
