= Charles Lowell (minister) =

American Unitarian minister (1782–1861)

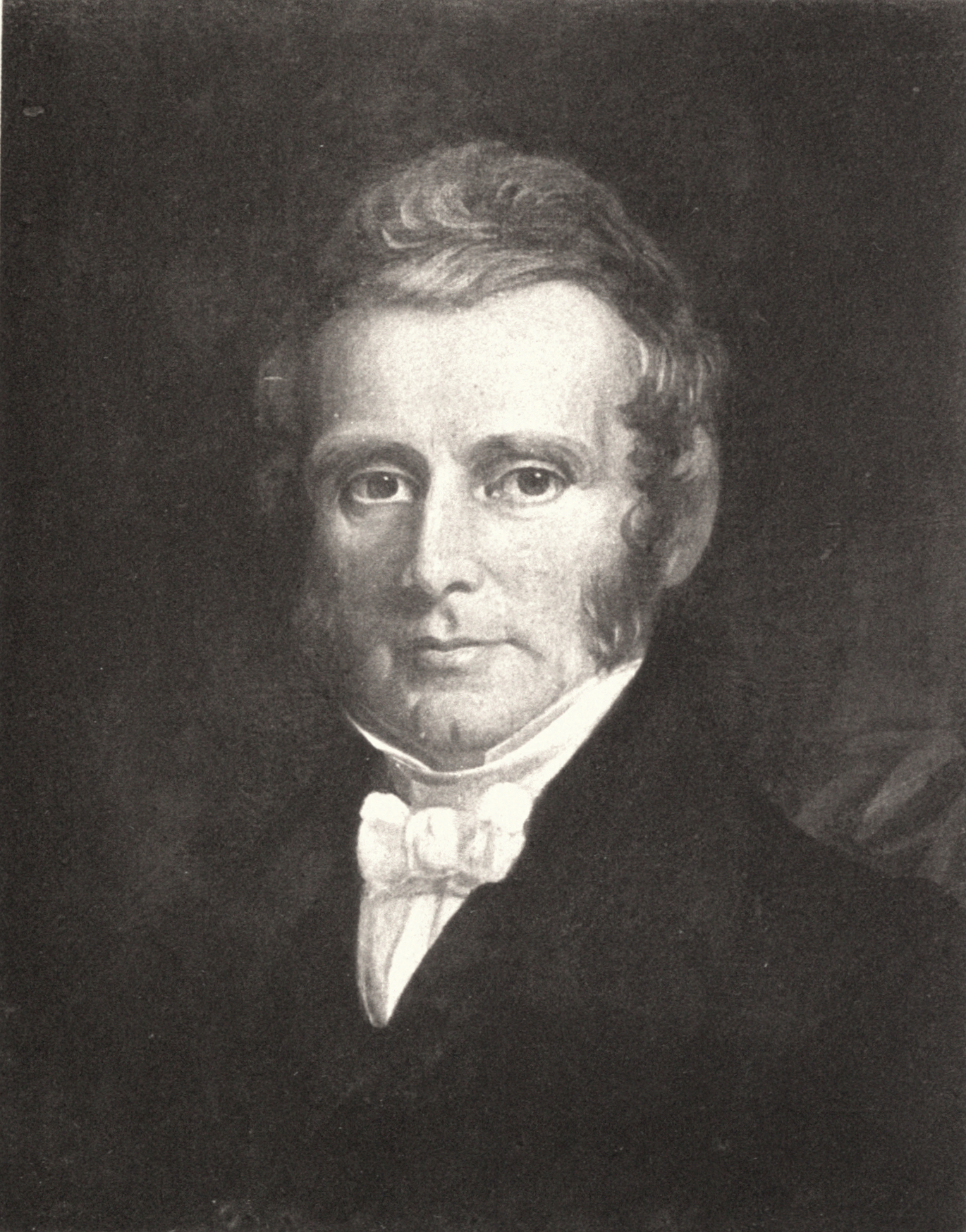
- Rev. Charles Lowell, D.D.
- Born: August 15, 1782; Boston, Massachusetts
- Died: January 20, 1861 (aged 78); Cambridge, Massachusetts
- Occupation: Unitarian minister
- Children: James Russell Lowell, Robert Traill Spence Lowell, Mary Lowell Putnam, and others
- Father: John Lowell

Charles Lowell (15 August 1782 – 20 January 1861) was a Unitarian minister and a son of judge John Lowell, as well as the father of James Russell Lowell and Robert Traill Spence Lowell.

== Biography ==
He was born in Boston, Massachusetts, and attended The Roxbury Latin School and later Phillips Academy in Andover. He graduated from Harvard College in 1800, where he studied law and then theology. After two years in Edinburgh, Scotland and one year on the Continent, Lowell was, from 1806 until his death, pastor of the West Congregational (Unitarian) Church of Boston, a charge in which Cyrus A. Bartol was associated with him after 1837. From that year until 1840, he traveled extensively in Europe and the east. During the latter part of his life Lowell officiated only occasionally in his church.

Lowell was elected a member of the American Antiquarian Society in 1814, and served on its board of councilors from 1820 to 1853.

He married Harriet, daughter of Robert T. Spence, of Portsmouth, New Hampshire, an officer in the U. S. Navy. Harvard gave him the degree of D.D. in 1823. He was a fellow of its corporation from 1818 until 1833. He was a member of literary societies in the United States and elsewhere. The "Proceedings" of a parish meeting that was held in his memory were published in 1861.

Almost alone, he spoke out from the pulpit against slavery to Boston's elite. After passage of the Fugitive Slave Law in 1850, he was asked to speak at a protest rally with other abolitionists including Frederick Douglas. At the standing-room only Faneuil Hall rally to Repudiate the Fugitive Slave Law, on October 14, 1850, Reverend Lowell spoke first, and began the evening with a prayer:

"May nothing be said and done here that shall not approve itself to Thee, the pure and holy God. May all things be done decently and in order, to the promotion of justice and humanity. O Thou, -who art no respecter of persons, who art love and dwelleth in love, look in mercy upon those of our brethren on whose behalf we are now assembled, fugitives from slavery. Protect and bless them, and preserve them, if it please Thee, from being returned to the house of bondage. Look in mercy upon those who are still subjected to involuntary servitude, and may the time soon come, when those who enslave them shall grant them the blessings of freedom. May the time shortly come, when this whole nation shall feel the injustice of making merchandise of human beings, and we shall act in consistency with, our profession as freemen and Christians. God of mercy, who hath made of one blood all nations, incline the hearts of all men, every where. to kindness and brotherly love; hasten the time when, without violence and bloodshed, every yoke shall be broken, and the oppressed go free; when none shall make merchandize of the souls of men; when all shall be made free in Christ Jesus, and His kingdom shall be established in every land and in every heart. Forgive our sins, O God; forgive the sins of the nation against our brethren, intelligent, moral, immortal like ourselves, and bring not down upon as the judgment we justly deserve. Spare us, good Lord, spare us! Hear us in this, our humble prayer, through thine infinite mercy."(The Liberator, Vol. XX, No. 42).

== Family ==
He was a son of John Lowell, "The Old Judge", and half-brother of businessman Francis Cabot Lowell. His sons included the poet James Russell Lowell and clergyman Robert Traill Spence Lowell. His daughter was Mary Lowell Putnam. His son Charles Russell Lowell married to the writer Anna Cabot Lowell and they had a daughter who died in young age around 1850.

== Works ==
He contributed largely to periodical literature and published many separate discourses, a volume of Occasional Sermons, one of Practical Sermons (Boston, 1855), Meditations for the Afflicted, Sick, and Dying and Devotional Exercises for Communicants.

== See also ==
- Lowell family
