= Robert Traill Spence Lowell =

American clergyman and educator

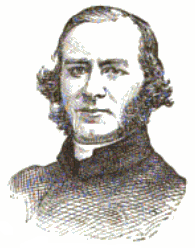
- Born: October 8, 1816; Boston, Massachusetts
- Died: September 12, 1891 (aged 74); Schenectady, New York
- Education: Round Hill School; Harvard University
- Occupations: Clergyman, educator
- Parents: Charles Russell Lowell, Sr. (father); Harriet Traill Spence (mother)

Robert Traill Spence Lowell (October 8, 1816 – September 12, 1891) was an Episcopal clergyman and educator.

== Biography ==
Lowell was born in Boston, Massachusetts, a son of Charles Russell Lowell, Sr. and Harriet Traill Spence. He studied at Round Hill School, under Joseph Cogswell and George Bancroft, and graduated from Harvard in 1833. He then took a full course at Harvard Medical School, and engaged in mercantile pursuits for a time.

In 1839, he began the study of theology under advice of Alonzo Potter (afterward bishop of Pennsylvania), and prepared for orders. He was invited by Bishop Spencer, of Newfoundland, to go to Bermuda, where he was made deacon in December 1842, and priest in March 1843, and was also appointed domestic chaplain to the bishop and inspector of schools in the colony.

He went to Newfoundland in 1843, and was appointed to the charge of Bay Roberts ("Peterport" in his novel The New Priest). While he was occupied in duty here, fishery failure and potato blight brought a severe famine upon the people (1846), during which Lowell's medical training proved to be especially useful. He was chairman of the relief committee of the district, and earned the thanks and gratitude of the government and people. His health and strength gave way, and he found it necessary to return to the United States in 1847.

He next began mission work among the poorer people in Newark, New Jersey, gathered a congregation called Christ Church, and built a stone church in 1849–50, which was open and free to all, with daily services. In 1859 he accepted a call to Christ Church, Duanesburg, New York, which post he held for ten years. Thence he went to Southborough, Massachusetts, where for four years he was headmaster of St. Mark's School. In 1873 he became professor of the Latin language and literature in Union College, Schenectady, New York, and discharged the duties of that department for six years.

He died in Schenectady on September 12, 1891.

== Works ==
Lowell's publications are The New Priest in Conception Bay (Boston, 1858; new ed., illustrated by F. O. C. Darley, 1863), Fresh Hearts That Failed Three Thousand Years Ago, and Other Poems (1860), Antony Brade, a Story of School-Boy Life (1874), Burgoyne's March, the poem at the Saratoga county centennial celebration at Bemis Heights (1877), and A Story or Two from a Dutch Town (1878). He has also been during a large part of his life a frequent contributor in both verse and prose to reviews, magazines, and literary journals. One of his most striking productions, "A Raft That No Man Made", is an imaginative story, which a year or two after its publication was almost exactly paralleled by the actual experience of a portion of the crew of the Polaris.
